= Madison =

Madison may refer to:

== People ==
- Madison (name), a given name and a surname
- James Madison (1751–1836), fourth president of the United States
- Madison (footballer), Brazilian footballer

== Places in the United States ==
=== Populated places ===
- Madison, Wisconsin, the state capital of Wisconsin and the largest city known by this name
- Madison, Alabama
- Madison, Arkansas
- Madison, California
- Madison, Connecticut
- Madison, Florida
- Madison, Georgia
- Madison, Illinois
- Madison, Indiana
- Madison, Kansas
- Madison, Maine, a town
  - Madison (CDP), Maine, a census-designated place within the town of Madison
- Madison, Minnesota
- Madison, Mississippi
- Madison, Missouri
- Madison, Nebraska
- Madison, New Hampshire
- Madison, New Jersey
- Madison, New York, a town
  - Madison (village), New York, within the town of Madison
- Madison, North Carolina
- Madison, Ohio
- Madison, Pennsylvania
- Madison, South Dakota
- Madison, Tennessee
- Madison, Virginia
- Madison, West Virginia
- Madison (town), Wisconsin, former township annexed by the city of Madison
- Madison Lake, Minnesota
- Madison Park, Seattle, Washington

=== Streets ===
- Madison Avenue, a famous avenue in New York City
- Madison Street (Chicago), a major thoroughfare
- Madison Street (Manhattan)

=== Nature ===
- Madison Blue Spring State Park, in Florida
- Madison River, in Wyoming and Montana
- Madison Square and Madison Square Park, a public square and park in New York City
- Mount Madison, in the White Mountains of New Hampshire

=== Buildings ===
- The Madison (Cape Town), a building in the city of Cape Town, South Africa
- Madison Square Garden and previous buildings of the same name, all in New York City:
  - Madison Square Garden (1879), the original open-air arena
  - Madison Square Garden (1890), an indoor arena built on the same site
  - Madison Square Garden (1925), an indoor arena built on a different site (not occupied by the current Garden)

=== Schools ===
- University of Wisconsin–Madison
- James Madison University, Harrisonburg, Virginia
- Madison College (disambiguation)
- Madison University, Mississippi

== Entertainment ==
- Madison (album), a 2021 album by Sloppy Jane
- Madison (2000s band), a former American rock band from New Jersey
- Madison (dance)
- Madison (film)
- Madison (TV series), a Canadian TV series running 1993–1997
- Madison (video game), a 2022 horror video game
- Madison Records, a U.S. record label
- The Madison (TV series), an American drama series

== Ships ==
- USCS Madison, a survey ship in service with the United States Coast Survey from 1850 to 1858
- Madison (1855), a side-wheel steamer scuttled at Troy Spring, Florida in 1863
- USS Madison, two United States Navy ships and one United States Revenue Cutter Service (later United States Coast Guard) cutter
- USS James Madison, one United States Navy guided-missile submarine and one United States Revenue Cutter Service (later United States Coast Guard) cutter

== Nicknames ==
- "Il Madison", an Italian nickname for PalaDozza arena in Bologna
- "Madison", the code name for an Itanium 2 processor
- "Madison", the code name for a wiki-like platform for drafting and commenting upon legislative text, first used with the Online Protection and Enforcement of Digital Trade Act

== Other uses ==
- Madison (cycling), a track cycling event, named after the first and second Madison Square Gardens
- Madison piercing, a body piercing at the front of the neck
- Madison (dog), an animal actress who is best known for playing the role of Vincent in the TV show Lost

== See also ==
- Madisonville (disambiguation)
- Madison Avenue (disambiguation)
- Madison County (disambiguation)
- Madison Heights (disambiguation)
- Madison High School (disambiguation)
- Madison Park (disambiguation)
- Madison Township (disambiguation)
- Madison Scouts Drum and Bugle Corps
- Marbury v. Madison
- Maddison, a surname and given name
- Madsen (disambiguation)
- Madson (disambiguation)
