= Runyon Watershed =

- Runyon in Middlesex County, New Jersey Runyon Watershed (New Jersey) Runyon Watershed (the United States)
- Coordinates: 40°26′03″N 74°19′56″W
- Country: United States
- State: New Jersey
- County: Middlesex
- Township and Borough: Old Bridge and Sayreville
- Elevation: 30 ft (9.1 m)
- GNIS feature ID: 879863

The Runyon Watershed is a reservoir system located in Old Bridge Township, New Jersey, United States, just south of Sayreville. It is operated by the Middlesex Water Company. The 1,100 acres (450 ha) watershed area was first established in the late 1800 when it was purchased by the city of Perth Amboy, which developed a reservoir and waterworks in the 1920s, and turned over management to the company in 2003. The area is protected, with more than 500 acres of the tract are wetlands that are from development by the state's 1990 Watershed Moratorium Act A weather station in Runyon recorded a high temperature of 110 °F (43 °C) on July 10, 1936, setting the record for the hottest temperature ever recorded in New Jersey.

== See also ==
- List of neighborhoods in Sayreville, New Jersey
