= Sayreville War Memorial High School =

High school in Middlesex County, New Jersey, US

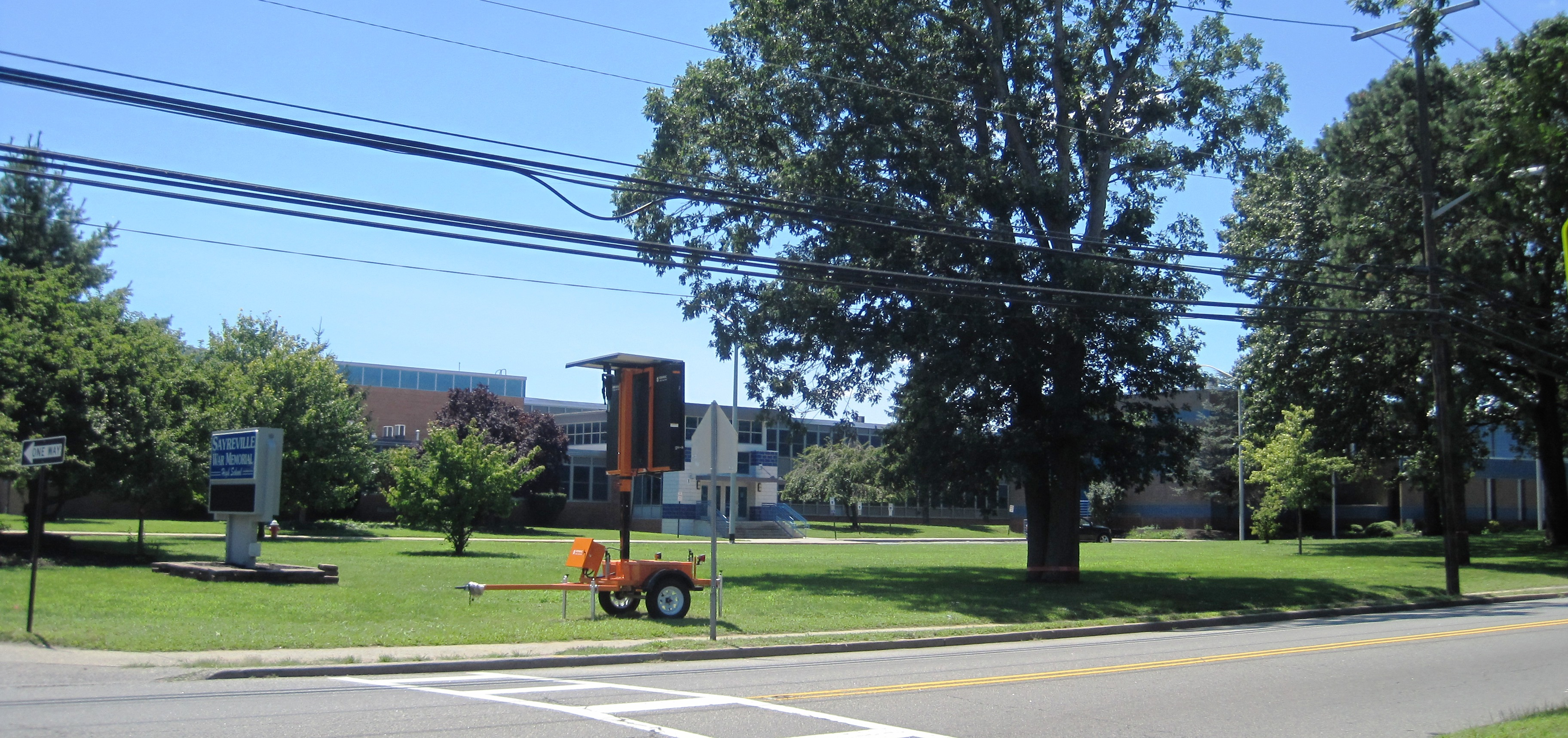

Location
- 820 Washington Road (CR 535); Sayreville, Middlesex County, New Jersey 08859; United States; 40.46277°N 74.323919°W

Information
- Type: Public high school
- Established: 1939 (original location); 1962 (current building)
- School district: Sayreville Public Schools
- Superintendent: Richard Labbe
- NCES School ID: 341464003580
- Principal: Richard Gluchowski
- Faculty: 141.0 FTEs
- Grades: 9 to 12
- Enrollment: 1,764 (as of 2024–25)
- Student to teacher ratio: 12.5:1
- Colors: Blue gray
- Athletics conference: Greater Middlesex Conference (general); Big Central Football Conference (football)
- Team name: Bombers
- Accreditation: Middle States Association of Colleges and Schools
- Yearbook: Quo Vadis
- Website: swmhs.sayrevillek12.net

Sayreville War Memorial High School (SWMHS) is a four-year public high school located in the Parlin section of Sayreville, in Middlesex County, in the U.S. state of New Jersey, serving students in ninth through twelfth grades as the lone secondary school of the Sayreville Public Schools district. The school is home to the Sayreville Bombers, who are best known for their varsity football and track program. Sayreville's colors are blue and grey. The name "War Memorial" recognizes the World War II veterans who reside in the borough.

The school is accredited by the New Jersey Department of Education and has been accredited by the Middle States Association of Colleges and Schools Commission on Elementary and Secondary Schools since 1946; the school is accredited until January 2032 by Middle States.

As of the 2024–25 school year, the school had an enrollment of 1,764 students and 141.0 classroom teachers (on an FTE basis), for a student–teacher ratio of 12.5:1. There were 659 students (37.4% of enrollment) eligible for free lunch and 156 (8.8% of students) eligible for reduced-cost lunch.

== Awards, recognition and rankings ==
The school was the 163rd-ranked public high school in New Jersey out of 339 schools statewide in New Jersey Monthly magazine's September 2014 cover story on the state's "Top Public High Schools", using a new ranking methodology. The school had been ranked 241st in the state of 328 schools in 2012, after being ranked 232nd in 2010 out of 322 schools listed. The magazine ranked the school 213th in 2008 out of 316 schools. The school was ranked 217th in the magazine's September 2006 issue, which surveyed 316 schools across the state.

Schooldigger.com ranked the school 222nd out of 376 public high schools statewide in its 2010 rankings (an increase of 1 position from the 2009 rank) which were based on the combined percentage of students classified as proficient or above proficient on the language arts literacy and mathematics components of the High School Proficiency Assessment (HSPA).

Newsweek listed the school on its "Beating the Odds 2015: Top High Schools for Low-Income Students" list, recognizing schools that help students with economic challenges achieve academic success.

== Athletics ==
The Sayreville War Memorial High School Bombers compete in the Greater Middlesex Conference, which is comprised of public and private high schools located in the greater Middlesex County area and operates under the supervision of the New Jersey State Interscholastic Athletic Association (NJSIAA). Sports consist of tennis, bowling, softball, field hockey, soccer, basketball, swimming, football, cross country, track and field, baseball, volleyball, golf, cheerleading, lacrosse, and wrestling. With 1,342 students in grades 10-12, the school was classified by the NJSIAA for the 2019–20 school year as Group IV for most athletic competition purposes, which included schools with an enrollment of 1,060 to 5,049 students in that grade range. The football team was reclassified into Central Jersey, Group V for the 2013 and 2014 seasons, and then into North Jersey II, Group IV starting with the 2015 season.

The football team competes in Division 5D of the Big Central Football Conference, which includes 60 public and private high schools in Hunterdon, Middlesex, Somerset, Union and Warren counties, which are broken down into 10 divisions by size and location. The school was classified by the NJSIAA as Group V South for football for 2024–2026, which included schools with 1,333 to 2,324 students.

The school participates as the host school / lead agency for joint cooperative field hockey and football teams with South Amboy Middle High School. These co-op programs operate under agreements scheduled to expire at the end of the 2023–24 school year.

=== Championships ===
The boys' basketball team won the Group I state championship in 1951 (defeating Verona High School in the tournament final) and 1952 (vs. Dunellen High School). The 1951 team won the Group I title with a 46-36 win against Verona in the championship game played in the Elizabeth Armory.

The boys' track team won the Group IV state indoor relay championship in 1968.

The field hockey team won the Central Jersey Group IV state sectional championship in 1975.

The football team won the NJSIAA Central Jersey Group III state sectional championship in 1997, the Central Jersey Group IV title in 2010, 2011 and 2012, the North Jersey II Group IV title in 2016 and the Central Jersey Group V title in 2018.

The 2012 team finished the season 12-0 after winning the Central Jersey Group IV title with a 35-28 win against Middletown High School South in the championship game, the program's third straight sectional title; the 2004 team earned consideration from the Courier News as one of "the best in GMC history". The team won the 2016 North Jersey II Group IV title, defeating Middletown High School North by a score of 41-13 in the finals. The team won the Central Jersey Group V title in 2018 with a 6-0 win against North Brunswick Township High School in the championship game and then went on to finish the season with a 12-1 record by defeating Williamstown High School by a score of 14-7 in the Central / South Group V bowl game. Prior to the creation of the playoff system, the team had unbeaten seasons in 1941 (6-0-1), 1946 (9-0) and 1949 (8-0).

The boys' bowling team won the Group III state championship in 2008-2010 and 2013, 2015 and 2016; the program's six group titles are ranked second in the state. The team won the Tournament of Champions in 2008, 2009 and 2013 and 2016, making the program the only one to win the ToC more than twice.

The boys' wrestling team won the North II Group III state sectional championship in 2008.

The boys' track team won the Group IV spring / outdoor track state championship in 2014.

=== Hazing ===
On October 6, 2014, in the wake of a criminal investigation into allegations of repeated serious hazing among members of the football team. Sayreville's school superintendent Richard Labbe, himself a former assistant football coach at SWMHS, announced the cancellation of the remainder of the high school's 2014 football season for its varsity, junior varsity and freshman teams. The school suspended seven students after county prosecutors charged them with crimes including sexual assault of their younger teammates, in a case that received widespread media coverage and "focused national attention on hazing". The athletic director resigned; the head coach was transferred to an elementary school; and the seven students remained suspended for the duration of the 2014–2015 school year. By August 2015, six of them were sentenced to probation and community service for lesser crimes ranging from hazing to simple assault. The seventh criminal case was settled in February 2016. According to junior varsity players, "the same thing had been done to them by upperclassmen when they were freshmen. It's been going on for a long time."

== Administration ==
The school's principal is Richard Gluchowski. His core administration team includes the three vice principals.

== Notable alumni ==
- Carlo Alban (born 1979, class of 1996), actor who appeared on Sesame Street and Prison Break.
- Barry T. Albin (born 1952, class of 1970), justice of the New Jersey Supreme Court
- Jon Bon Jovi (born 1962, class of 1980), lead singer of the rock band Bon Jovi
- Jamaal Bowman (born 1976), member of the United States House of Representatives from New York's 16th congressional district.
- Randy Corman (born 1960, class of 1978), New Jersey politician and judge who represented the 19th Legislative District in the New Jersey Senate from 1992 to 1994
- Greg Evigan (born 1953, class of 1971), actor who appeared in B.J. and the Bear and My Two Dads
- Kene Eze (born 1992, class of 2010), soccer player for North Geelong Warriors FC, after setting SWMHS record with 106 career goals
- Jehyve Floyd (born 1997), basketball player in the Israeli Basketball Premier League.
- Marilyn Ghigliotti (born 1961, class of 1979), actress who played the character Veronica Loughran in Kevin Smith's cult hit Clerks
- Myles Hartsfield (born 1997), American football safety and running back for the Carolina Panthers of the National Football League
- Dulé Hill (born 1975, class of 1993), actor on Psych and The West Wing
- Rhonda Rompola (born 1960, class of 1978), head women's basketball coach at Southern Methodist University
- Edward D. Thalmann (1945–2004, class of 1962), expert in diving medicine
- Mike Wasko (born 1964, class of 1982), bobsledder who competed in the four-man event at the 1988 Winter Olympics.
- John Wisniewski (born 1962, class of 1980), member of the New Jersey General Assembly from 1996 to 2018
- Victor J. Wolski (born 1962, class of 1980), federal judge

=== Jon Bon Jovi ===
Alumnus and famous rock star Jon Bon Jovi was invited back to his alma mater, Sayreville War Memorial High School, on October 2, 2025, to receive the honor of being inducted into the SWMHS hall of fame. During his visit, the school revealed that they renamed their auditorium to the "Jon Bon Jovi Performing Arts Center" and unveiled a mural painted in his honor in front of the art wing. Additionally, they renamed their music suite the "Jon Bon Jovi Music Suite" to commemorate the singer. A sign bearing the new name was placed above a signed guitar that Bon Jovi donated during his visit.

In addition to the guitar donation, as a thank you for his induction into the school's hall of fame, he made a donation to the music department providing the school with a brand-new recording studio and commemorative T-shirts. During his visit at his old High School, he graciously participated in a question-and-answer segment, followed by an autograph signing in the newly renamed performing arts center.

He then returned eight months later he returned to Sayreville War memorial High School as a surprise guest at the Class of 2025 graduation ceremony. He delivered a speech to the graduating class as well as to their families, faculty and staff.
