= Wasko =

Wasko may refer to:

- Tadeusz Waśko (1922-1980), Polish footballer
- Joseph Wasko (born 1931), French former professional racing cyclist
- Ryszard Wasko (born 1947), Polish artist in multiple media, curator and event organizer
- Piotr Waśko (1961–2023), Polish politician
- Mike Wasko (born 1964), American former bobsledder
- Mount Wasko, Ross Dependency, Antarctica
