= Phoenix, New Jersey =

Phoenix, New Jersey may refer to:

- Phoenix, Edison, New Jersey
- Phoenix, Sayreville, New Jersey
