= Riverton (Sayreville, New Jersey) =

Real estate development in New Jersey

Coordinates: 40°27′45″N 74°19′30″W

Riverton is a real estate development located in Sayreville, New Jersey on the south bank of the Raritan River. It is situated nearby the Garden State Parkway near where the Edison Bridge and Driscoll Bridge cross the river. The site was formerly owned by National Lead.

In 2023, the project received $400 million in tax incentives from the New Jersey Economic Development Authority.

Bass Pro Shops will anchor the retail section of the project.

== See also ==
- List of neighborhoods in Sayreville, New Jersey
