= Eunice Dwumfour =

American politician (1993–2023)

Personal details
- Born: April 4, 1992 East Orange, New Jersey, U.S.
- Died: February 1, 2023 (aged 30) Parlin, New Jersey, U.S.
- Cause of death: Assassination
- Party: Republican
- Spouse: Peter Ezechukwu
- Children: 1
- Parent(s): Prince Dwumfour; Mary Dwumfour
- Education: William Paterson University

Eunice Dwumfour (April 4, 1992—February 1, 2023) was an American politician who served as a Republican member of the borough council of Sayreville, New Jersey, from 2021 until her assassination. Dwumfour was the first person of African descent to serve in that position. She also worked as a business analyst and emergency medical technician. Dwumfour, a leader in Christian entities, was married and had a daughter.

== Early life and education ==
Dwumfour was born on April 4, 1992 in East Orange, New Jersey, the daughter of Mary and Prince Dwumfour, who are from Ghana. She graduated from Weequahic High School in 2010 and received a bachelor's degree from William Paterson University in 2017.

== Career ==
Dwumfour worked as a part-time emergency technician and business analyst. She was elected as council member in the Borough of Sayreville in an unexpected result in 2021, after running as Republican. She had also been a pastor at an African Christian church in Newark and a director in Champions Royal Assembly, an international religious organization.

== Personal life ==
The councilwoman has a 12-year-old daughter and had recently married Peter Ezechukwu, a pastor from Nigeria.

== Assassination ==
Dwumfour was in her SUV outside of her Sayreville townhouse when she was shot 14 times on February 1, 2023, at around 7:30 pm. Her vehicle proceeded to roll downhill and crashed into several cars.

=== Aftermath ===
New Jersey governor Phil Murphy expressed shock and indicated that Dwumfour was the first elected official in recent memory who had been shot and killed in the state. The GOP Chairwoman and the mayor of Sayreville, Victoria Kilpatrick, both praised her. The family of the councilwoman wanted closure and hired attorney John Wisniewski, a former member of the state Assembly. For months the investigation was perceived as stalled, without suspects or motives.

Rashid Ali Bynum, a resident of Portsmouth, Virginia, was arrested in that city on May 30, 2023, and charged with the murder of Dwumfour. Bynum is a former resident of Sayreville and had been a member of the Fire Congress Fellowship, a religious organization with offices near Sayreville that Dwumfour helped to lead. A press report says that the fellowship is affiliated with the Champions Royal Assembly, Dwumfour's church in Newark, which itself is an offshoot of a megachurch with a similar name that is based in Nigeria. The prosecutor for Middlesex County, New Jersey, said after the arrest that evidence implicating Bynum includes security camera video from the murder scene, and cellphone and toll records that indicate that Bynum was in Sayreville at the time of the murder. She did not comment on any suspected motive for the killing.

Bynum was subsequently extradited to New Jersey and indicted there on murder and weapons charges on August 16, 2023. On June 9, 2025 Bynum was convicted of the murder of Dwumfour. He was eventually sentenced to life in prison on August 18, 2025.

== Legacy ==
Dwumfour was the first person of African descent to serve as a member of the council of the Borough of Sayreville.

== See also ==
- James E. Davis – assassinated New York councilman
- John Huyler – assassinated New Jersey representative
