= Madison Street =

Madison Street may refer to:

- Madison Street (Manhattan), New York, United States
- Madison Street (Chicago), Illinois, United States
- Madison Street (Seattle), Washington, United States

== See also ==
- Madison Place (Washington, D.C.)
- Madison Avenue (disambiguation)
