= List of neighborhoods in Sayreville, New Jersey =

There are numerous historical and contemporary neighborhoods in Sayreville, a borough in Middlesex County, New Jersey, United States.

Sayreville has a total area of 18.704 square miles (48.442 km^{2}), of which 15.842 square miles (41.030 km^{2}) was land and 2.862 square miles (7.412 km^{2}) was water (15.30%). It is located on a peninsula shared with South Amboy, created by the Raritan River at the north, its tributary South River to the west, and the Raritan Bay to the east. The original village of Sayreville has been known as Sayre's Village, Upper Sayreville, and Sayreville Proper.

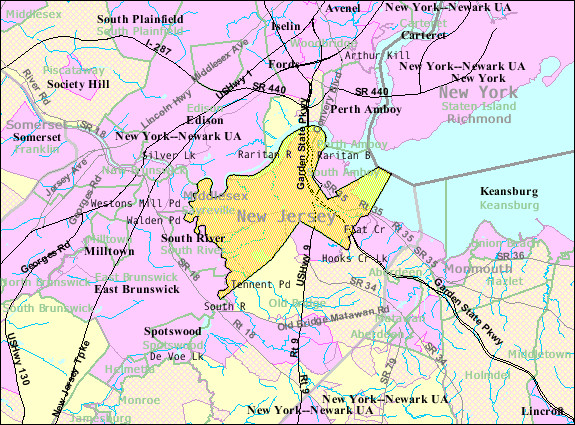

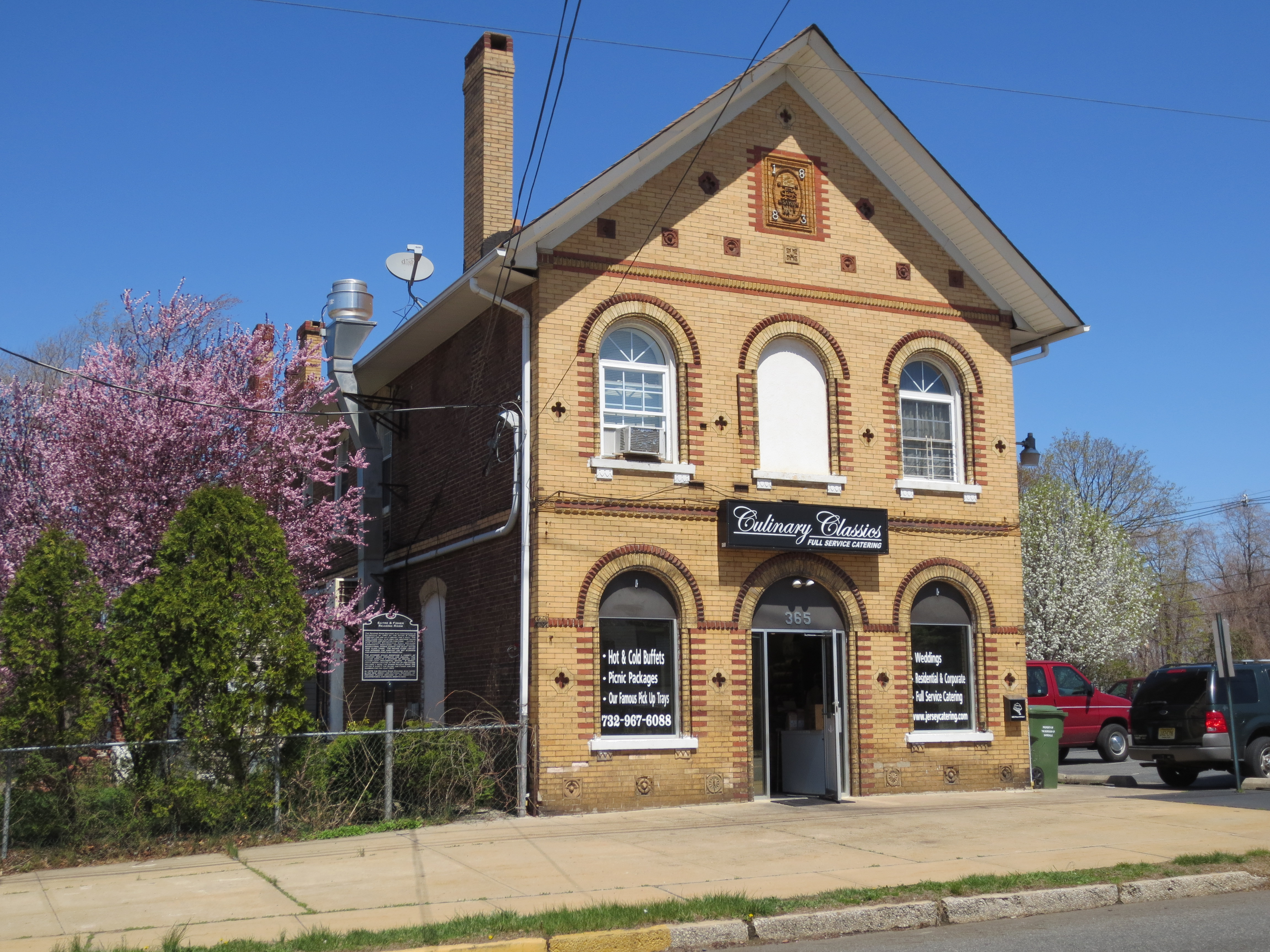
Sayre and Fisher Reading Room

Sayreville was originally settled by Europeans in the colonial era and was part the South Amboy Township formed in 1684. It seceded and incorporated as a township on April 6, 1876. The newly formed Township of Sayreville was created out of approximately 14 square miles of south of today's South Amboy consolidating the settlements at Morgan, Melrose, Ernston, and Sayre's Village under one municipal government. The area around the village was then known as Wood's Landing was renamed Sayreville after Sayre and Fisher Brick Company. Fewer than 2,000 people resided in the new township. Several areas take their name from stations along the Raritan River Railroad.

Sayreville developed into an industrial town in the late 19th century when most of the land was owned numerous clay, sand, and brick companies such the Such Clay Company, the Furman Brick Company, the Crossman Sand & Clay Company, Whitehead Brothers, and the Sayre & Fisher Brick Company, once the largest brickworks in the world. With the coming of other industries at the turn of the century such as DuPont, Hercules, and National Lead, Sayreville promoted itself as the “Home of Nationally Known Industries.” On April 2, 1919, the township was reincorporated as the Borough of Sayreville and ratified by a referendum held on April 29, 1919.

According to Joseph T. Karcher, an attorney, who wrote the post-war promotional The case for Sayreville, Middlesex County, New Jersey in 1947, the borough had seven residential districts, which were separated by the large industrial complexes throughout the borough. After World War II, with the sale of former clay land holdings to housing developers. President Park, a suburban subdivision, was built just after the war. Sayreville's population grew from 8,000 in 1945 to over 32,000 by 1970.

Much of Sayreville's housing was built in the 1940s, 1950s, and 1960s. In the 1950s many clay companies sold their land holdings and gave way new housing “developments”. The largest, Laurel Park, became home to over 500 families. Other projects included Pershing Park, Deerfield Estates, Hope Homes, Parkway Homes, and Haven Village. In the 1960s more housing developments such as Woodside, Sayre Woods, and Oak Tree East and West were built. In 1970s and 80s Sayreville transitioned from an industrial community to a suburb as its once vibrant industrial landscape gave way to housing developments, and as more residents commute to jobs outside of town it became more of bedroom community. By the 2000s, Sayreville's population surpassed 40,000 as brownfield land saw more housing construction.

== List of sections and neighborhoods ==
Neighborhood	Image	Zip Code	Coordinates	Notes	References
Crossmans		08872, 08879	40.485°N 74.321389°W	From Crossman's Clay, the section Crssmans was near Parlin and ran to the banks of the Raritan River	
Ernston			40.456111°N 74.310556°W	near Madison Park at Old Bridge border	
Gillespie		08872, 08879	40.451944°N 74.356111°W	T. A. Gillespie Company Shell Loading Plant	
La Mer				In the Parlin section	
Laurel Park			40.456944°N 74.313611°W	In the Ernston section near Madison Park section at Old Bridge Township border	
Lower Sayreville				Once a separate enclave on the Sayreville Branch	
MacArthur Manor			40°27′30″N 74°22′09″W	At the southern end of Sayreville Proper. Developed in the 1970s, many homes destroyed in Hurricane Sandy were removed from the flood zone.	
Melrose		08879	40.490833°N 74.296944°W	At the foot of Victory Bridge and Edison Bridge abutting South Amboy on either side of Route 35.	
Morgan		08879	40°28′00″N 74°16′06″W	East of Route 35 on Raritan Bay	
Morgan Heights		08879		East of Route 35 on Cheesequake Creek and Raritan Bay near Morgan Draw to Laurence Harbor	
Old Bridge			40.418717°N 74.3625627°W	Historical residential enclave along a meander of South River across from town of South River at west of Bordentown Avenue (CR 615), the border with Old Bridge Township.	
Parlin		08859	40.461944°N 74.338333°W	also Old Bridge Township	
Phoenix			40°28′40″N 74°18′47″W	At Main Street and Main Street Extension. Once part of the RRR, now a point on Conrail Shared Assets Operations (CRCX)	
Presidents Park			40.471586°N 74.3083817°W	Early suburban development along US Route 9 between Melrose and Parlin	
Riverton				Spit of land where Edison Bridge and Driscoll Bridge cross the Raritan. Once the site of National Lead, maker of Dutch Boy Paint. Proposed large-scale mixed use project.	.
Runyon			40.434167°N 74.332222°W		
Sayre-Woods/Oak Tree East			40.461111°N 74.291389°W	Along US Route 9 and Garden State Parkway	
Sayreville			40.471111°N 74.355278°W	aka Sayre's Village, Sayreville Proper or Upper Sayreville	
Sayreville Junction			40°27′55″N 74°19′50″W	Originally from Raritan River Railroad	
Sayreville Station			40°28′22″N 74°21′14″W	Originally terminus of Raritan River Railroad's Sayreville Branch	
Tangletown				part of Sayreville Proper/Upper Sayreville	
Townelake			40.478611°N 74.354722°W	around Towne Lake in near Sayreville Proper	
Winding Woods			40.4282742°N 74.3500168°W		

== See also ==
- List of neighborhoods in Edison, New Jersey
- List of neighborhoods in Woodbridge Township, New Jersey
- Neighborhoods in Perth Amboy, New Jersey
