= Troy Spring State Park =

State park in Florida, United States

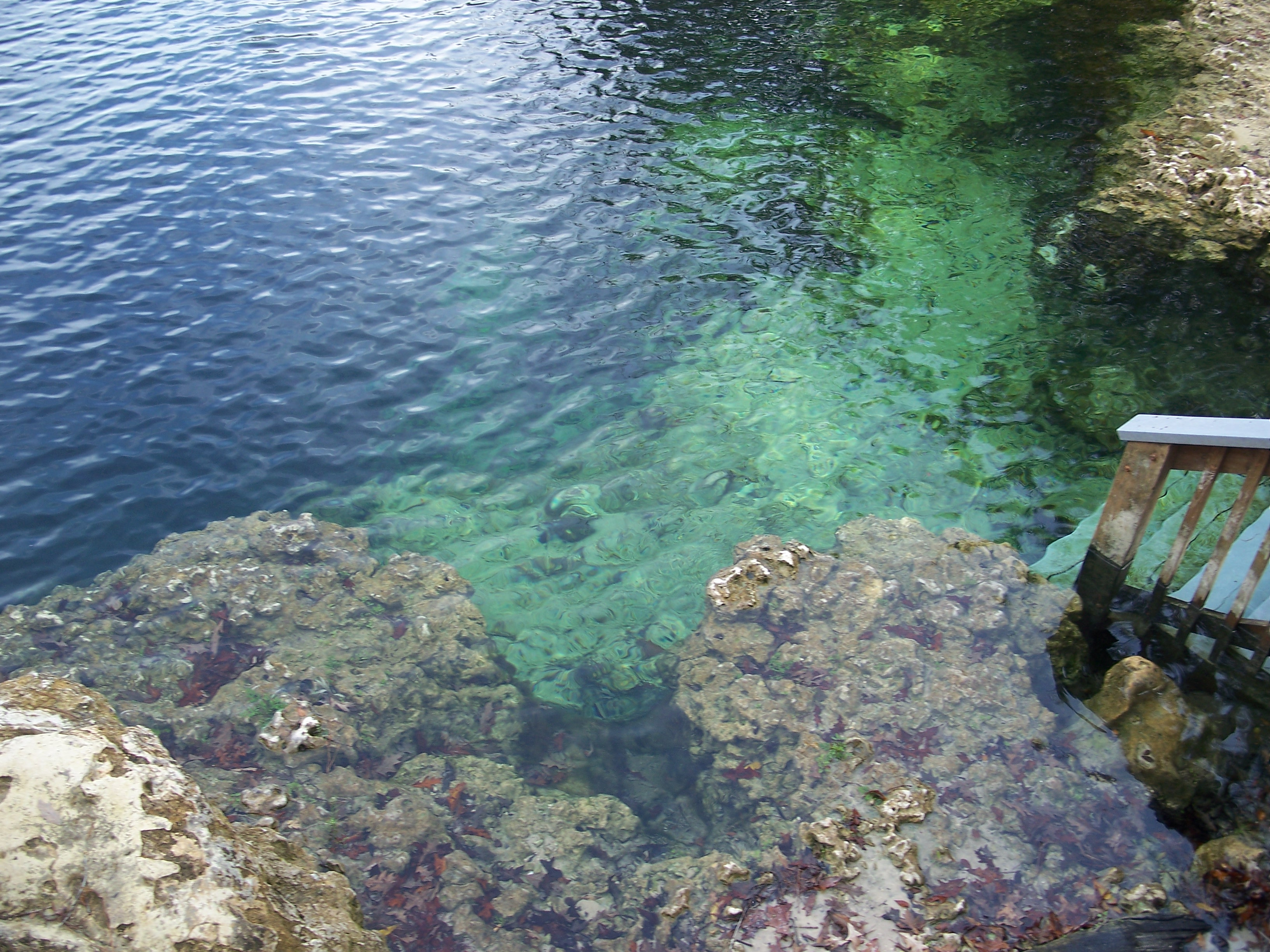
- Springs area

- Location within Florida Location within the United States
- Interactive map of Troy Spring State Park
- Location: Lafayette and Suwannee counties, Florida, United States
- Nearest city: Branford, Florida
- Coordinates: 30°0′21″N 82°59′49″W
- Governing body: Florida Department of Environmental Protection

Troy Spring State Park is a Florida State Park, located approximately six miles north of Branford, off US 27. It contains one of the state's 33 first magnitude springs.

At the bottom of the Troy Spring is the sunken Confederate sidewheel paddle steamer Madison, which had been owned and captained by James Felix Tucker. Tucker scuttled Madison in September 1863 to prevent her from falling into Union hands during the American Civil War.

== Spring ==
The main spring vent is approximately 70 feet (21 m) deep, and a 325-foot (99 m) spring run connects it to the Suwannee River. During floods, river water can back up into the spring and flow into the aquifer.

== Gallery ==
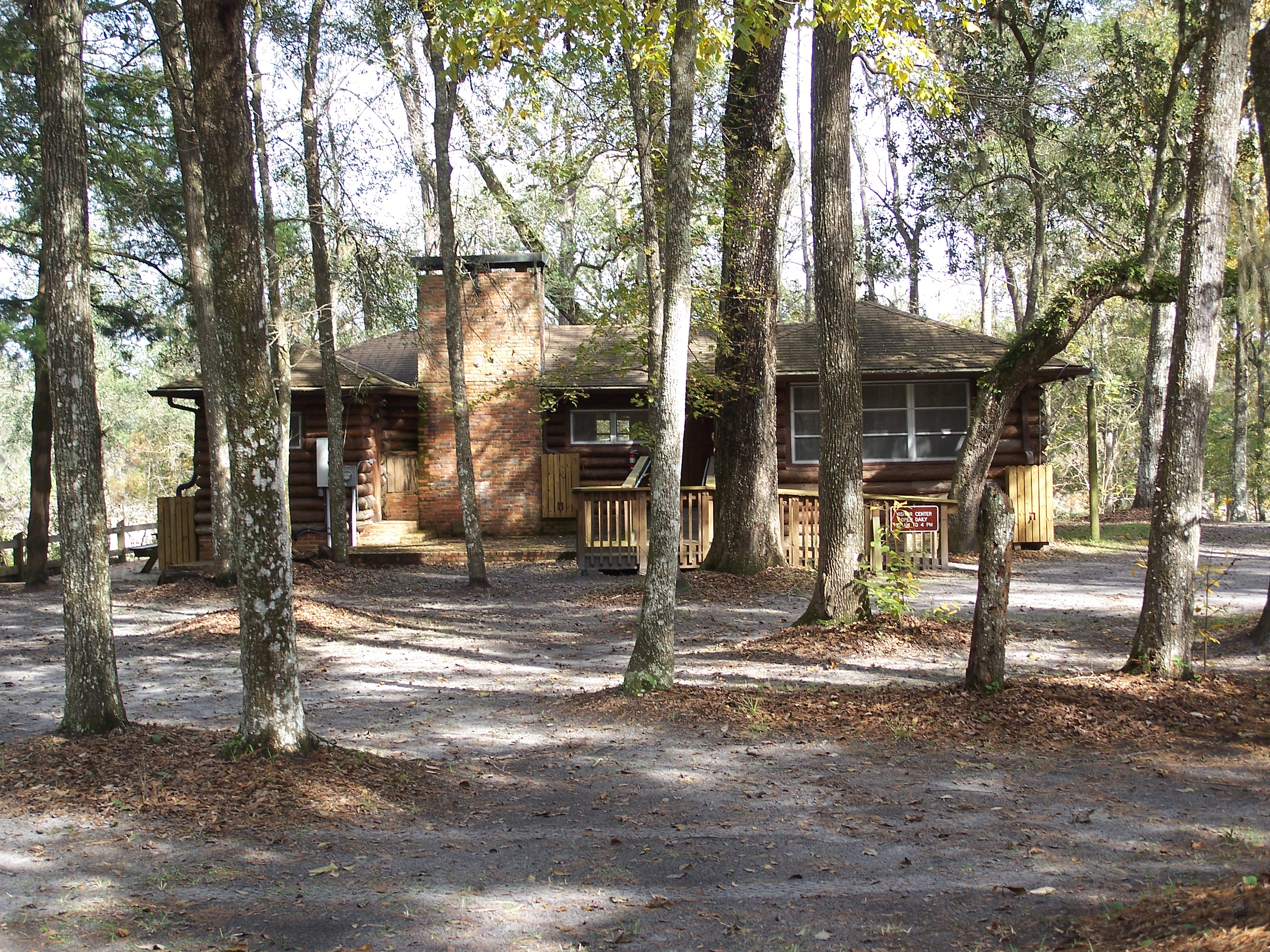
Visitor center

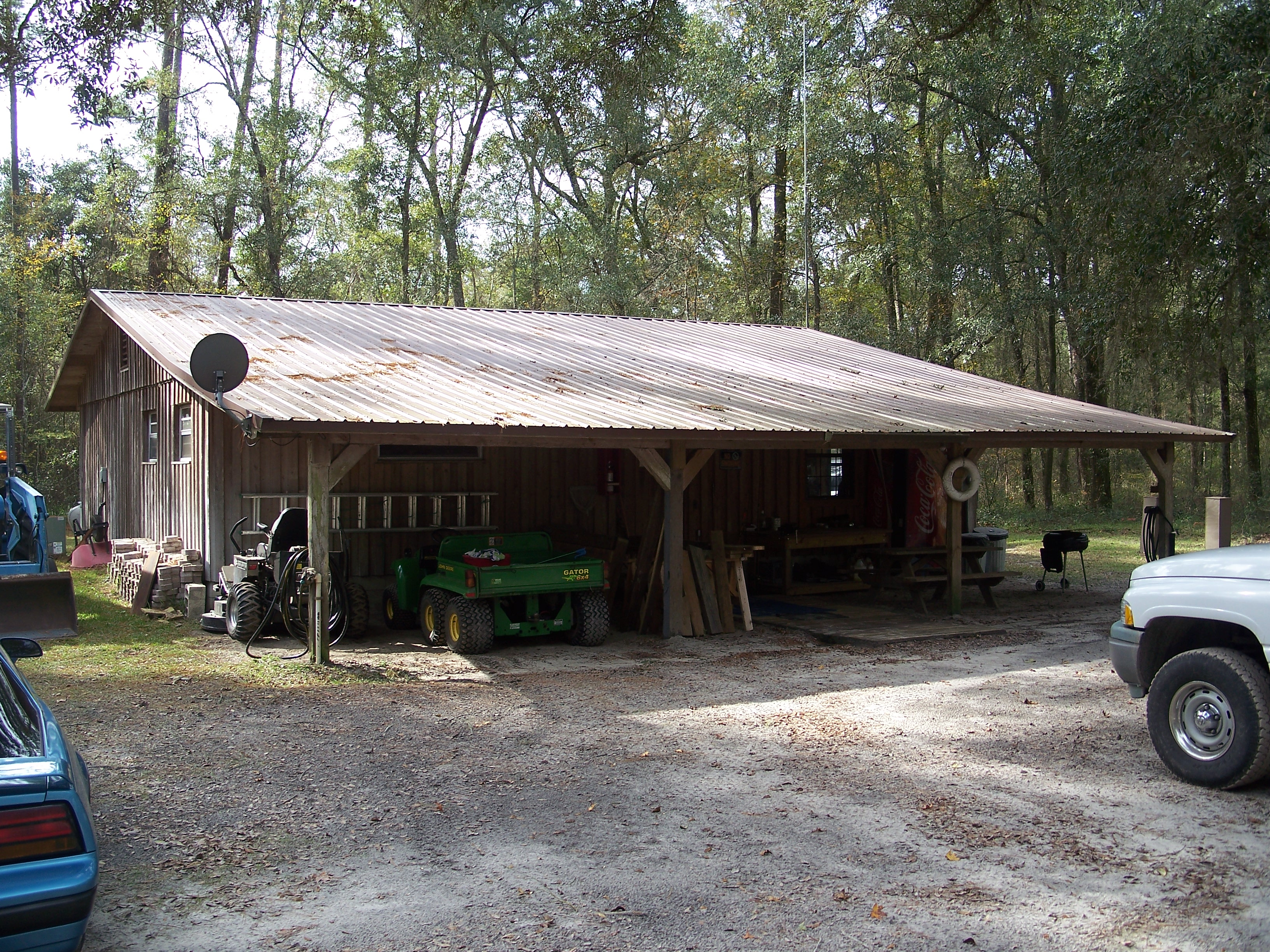
Ranger station

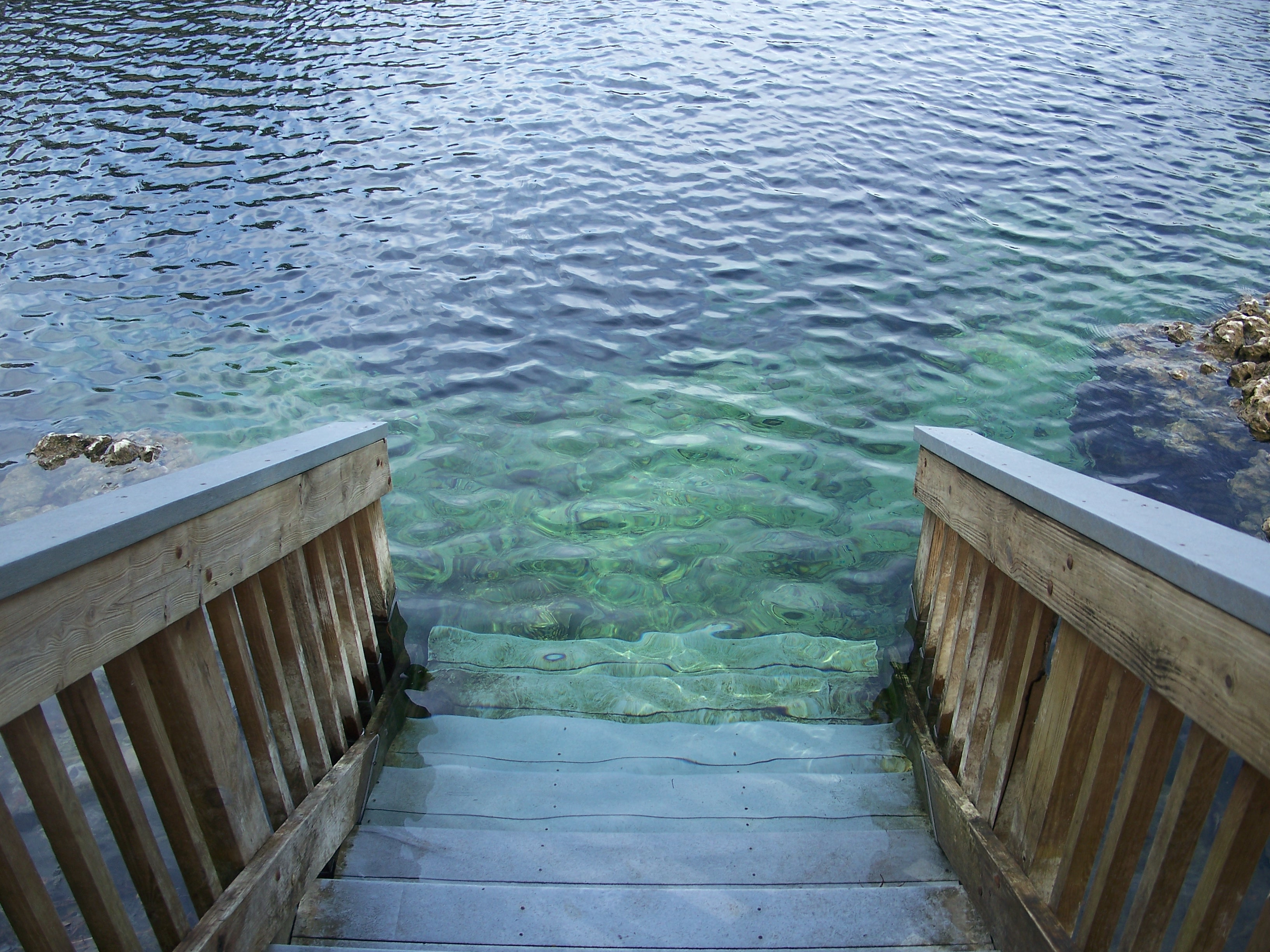
Stairs heading into the springs
