= Kene Eze =

American soccer player

Personal information
- Date of birth: January 21, 1992 (age 34)
- Place of birth: Sayreville, New Jersey; United States
- Height: 1.88 m (6 ft 2 in)
- Position: Forward

Team information
- Current team: FC Motown

Youth career
- 2010–2012: WPU Pioneers

College career
Years	Team	Apps	(Gls)
2013	Rutgers Scarlet Knights		

Senior career*
Years	Team	Apps	(Gls)
2014	Jersey Express	10	(7)
2015	Pittsburgh Riverhounds	2	(0)
2016–2018	North Geelong Warriors FC	23	(13)
2019–	FC Motown	3	(1)
- * Club domestic league appearances and goals as of 4 September 2019

Kene Eze (born January 21, 1992) is an American soccer player who plays as a forward for FC Motown in the National Premier Soccer League.

== Career ==
=== College and amateur ===
A native of Sayreville, New Jersey, Eze attended Sayreville War Memorial High School, where his 106 career goals set a school record.

Eze played four years of college soccer, beginning at William Paterson University in 2010 to 2012 and finishing in 2013 at Rutgers University.

=== Professional career ===
On January 21, 2014, Eze was selected 60th overall in the 2014 MLS SuperDraft by Toronto FC. Eze was not signed by Toronto, instead joining USL PDL club Jersey Express for their 2014 season. On January 27, 2015, Eze signed with USL club Pittsburgh Riverhounds.

=== Move to Australia ===
In March 2016, Eze relocated to Melbourne, Australia where he signed for National Premier Leagues Victoria 2 club North Geelong Warriors FC. Eze scored two goals on debut for the Warriors in a 7-1 routing of Shepparton South SC in the 2016 FFA Cup. Eze went on to also score on his league debut for North Geelong, netting the second in a 2–0 win over Goulburn Valley Suns FC. He grabbed his second league goal, and fourth overall, in an emphatic 7–2 win over Bendigo City FC in Round 7 of the NPLV2 season. Eze continued his good goalscoring form, grabbing a hattrick in a 5–2 win over FC Clifton Hill at Kevin Bartlett Reserve in Round 5 of the 2016 FFA Cup. He was then selected in "The Corner Flag"'s Team of the Month for April in his conference. Eze grabbed another hattrick for the Warriors in a 3–0 win over table-toppers Whittlesea Ranges FC at Epping Stadium in Round 23 of the NPLV2.

Eze re-signed with North Geelong for the 2017 National Premier Leagues Victoria season in December 2016.
