= Madison Park, New Jersey =

Populated place in Middlesex County, New Jersey, US

- Census-designated place
- Location of Madison Park in Middlesex County highlighted in red (left). Inset map: Location of Middlesex County in New Jersey highlighted in orange (right).

- Location in Middlesex County Location in New Jersey Location in the United States
- Coordinates: 40.445716°N 74.296163°W
- Country: United States
- State: New Jersey
- County: Middlesex
- Township: Old Bridge

Area
  - Total: 1.85 sq mi (4.78 km^{2})
  - Land: 1.82 sq mi (4.71 km^{2})
  - Water: 0.027 sq mi (0.07 km^{2}) 1.64%
- Elevation: 118 ft (36 m)

Population (2020)
  - Total: 8,050
  - Density: 4,427.9/sq mi (1,709.6/km^{2})
- Time zone: UTC−05:00 (Eastern (EST))
  - Summer (DST): UTC−04:00 (Eastern (EDT))
- ZIP Codes: 08859 (Parlin); 08879 (South Amboy); 08857 (Old Bridge)
- Area codes: 732/848
- FIPS code: 34-42540
- GNIS feature ID: 02390107

Madison Park is an unincorporated community and census-designated place (CDP) in Old Bridge Township, Middlesex County, New Jersey, United States. As of the 2020 census, the CDP's population was 8,050, up from 7,144 in 2010. The name "Madison Park" comes from Madison Township, the original name for Old Bridge Township from 1869 until 1975.

Madison Park is the name of a residential development constructed in 1955–1956 by Herbert J. Kendall. The original development is located west of U.S. Route 9 and is bounded by Bordentown Avenue, Cheesequake Road, and Ernston Road. The western side of Madison Park is served by ZIP Code 08859 for Parlin, New Jersey. Madison Park has a fire department (District 4 Old Bridge Township), a volunteer first aid squad, and a school all located within the development. All of the streets in the development are named after prominent universities, with Princeton Road as an oval interior road connecting to the entire development.

== Geography ==
Madison Park is in eastern Middlesex County, along the northern edge of Old Bridge Township. It is bordered to the north by the borough of Sayreville and to the southeast by Cheesequake Creek. U.S. Route 9 crosses the center of the CDP, leading north into Sayreville and south 14 miles (23 km) to Freehold.

According to the U.S. Census Bureau, the CDP had a total area of 3.00 square miles (7.77 km^{2}), including 2.95 square miles (7.64 km^{2}) of land and 0.05 square miles (0.13 km^{2}) of water (1.83%). The portion of the CDP east of Route 9 drains southeast to Cheesequake Creek, while portion west of Route 9 drains southwest toward Tennant Brook, a tributary of the South River. The entire community is within the watershed of Raritan Bay.

== Demographics ==
Historical population
Census	Pop.	Note	%±
1980	7,447		—
1990	7,490		0.6%
2000	6,929		−7.5%
2010	7,144		3.1%
2020	8,050		12.7%
Population sources: 1950 1960 1970; 1980 1990 2000; 2010 2020

Madison Park first appeared as a census designated place in the 1980 U.S. census.

=== Racial and ethnic composition ===
Madison Park CDP, New Jersey – Racial and ethnic composition Note: the US Census treats Hispanic/Latino as an ethnic category. This table excludes Latinos from the racial categories and assigns them to a separate category. Hispanics/Latinos may be of any race.
Race / Ethnicity (NH = Non-Hispanic)	Pop 2000	Pop 2010	Pop 2020	% 2000	% 2010	% 2020
White alone (NH)	3,395	3,164	3,038	49.00%	44.29%	37.74%
Black or African American alone (NH)	909	907	1,351	13.12%	12.70%	16.78%
Native American or Alaska Native alone (NH)	3	11	10	0.04%	0.15%	0.12%
Asian alone (NH)	1,380	1,827	2,072	19.92%	25.57%	25.74%
Native Hawaiian or Pacific Islander alone (NH)	8	0	2	0.12%	0.00%	0.02%
Other race alone (NH)	26	20	68	0.38%	0.28%	0.84%
Mixed race or Multiracial (NH)	304	221	212	4.39%	3.09%	2.63%
Hispanic or Latino (any race)	904	994	1,297	13.05%	13.91%	16.11%
Total	6,929	7,144	8,050	100.00%	100.00%	100.00%

=== 2020 census ===
As of the 2020 census, Madison Park had a population of 8,050. The median age was 37.3 years. 20.7% of residents were under the age of 18 and 11.3% of residents were 65 years of age or older. For every 100 females, there were 93.9 males, and for every 100 females age 18 and over, there were 89.8 males.

100.0% of residents lived in urban areas, while 0.0% lived in rural areas.

There were 3,055 households in Madison Park, of which 32.3% had children under the age of 18 living in them. Of all households, 47.9% were married-couple households, 18.2% were households with a male householder and no spouse or partner present, and 28.3% were households with a female householder and no spouse or partner present. About 23.2% of all households were made up of individuals and 6.4% had someone living alone who was 65 years of age or older.

There were 3,184 housing units, of which 4.1% were vacant. The homeowner vacancy rate was 0.6% and the rental vacancy rate was 4.3%.

=== 2010 census ===
The 2010 United States census counted 7,144 people, 730 households, and 1,858 families in the CDP. The population density was 4,306.9 people per square mile (1,662.9 people/km^{2}). There were 730 housing units at an average density of 1,648.3 units per square mile (636.4 units/km^{2}). The racial makeup was 52.14% (3,725) White, 13.26% (947) Black or African American, 0.24% (17) Native American, 25.74% (1,839) Asian, 0.00% (0) Pacific Islander, 4.23% (302) from other races, and 4.40% (314) from two or more races. Hispanic or Latino people of any race were 13.91% (994) of the population.

Of the 730 households, 33.3% had children under the age of 18; 51.1% were married couples living together; 13.7% had a female householder with no husband present and 29.1% were non-families. Of all households, 23.0% were made up of individuals and 4.6% had someone living alone who was 65 years of age or older. The average household size was 2.72 and the average family size was 3.28.

23.4% of the population were under the age of 18, 9.3% from 18 to 24, 30.9% from 25 to 44, 27.9% from 45 to 64, and 8.4% who were 65 years of age or older. The median age was 35.9 years. For every 100 females, the population had 98.3 males. For every 100 females ages 18 and older there were 95.8 males.

=== 2000 census ===
As of the 2000 United States census there were 6,929 people, 730 households, and 730 families living in the CDP. The population density was 1,631.3 people/km^{2} (4,225 people/mi^{2}). There were 730 housing units at an average density of 596.3 units/km^{2} (1,544 units/mi^{2}). The racial makeup of the CDP was 56.36% White, 13.75% African American, 0.10% Native American, 19.97% Asian, 0.12% Pacific Islander, 4.17% from other races, and 5.53% from two or more races. Hispanic or Latino people of any race were 13.05% of the population.

There were 730 households, out of which 39.1% had children under the age of 18 living with them, 53.7% were married couples living together, 12.5% had a female householder with no husband present, and 28.2% were non-families. 23.2% of all households were made up of individuals, and 5.3% had someone living alone who was 65 years of age or older. The average household size was 2.81 and the average family size was 3.37.

In the CDP the population was spread out, with 27.2% under the age of 18, 8.3% from 18 to 24, 35.9% from 25 to 44, 20.3% from 45 to 64, and 8.3% who were 65 years of age or older. The median age was 34 years. For every 100 females, there were 95.7 males. For every 100 females age 18 and over, there were 91.7 males.

The median income for a household in the CDP was $52,263, and the median income for a family was $56,025. Males had a median income of $40,766 versus $31,890 for females. The per capita income for the CDP was $21,622. About 6.0% of families and 8.0% of the population were below the poverty line, including 10.5% of those under age 18 and 7.9% of those age 65 or over.
