= Jehyve Floyd =

American basketball player (born 1997)

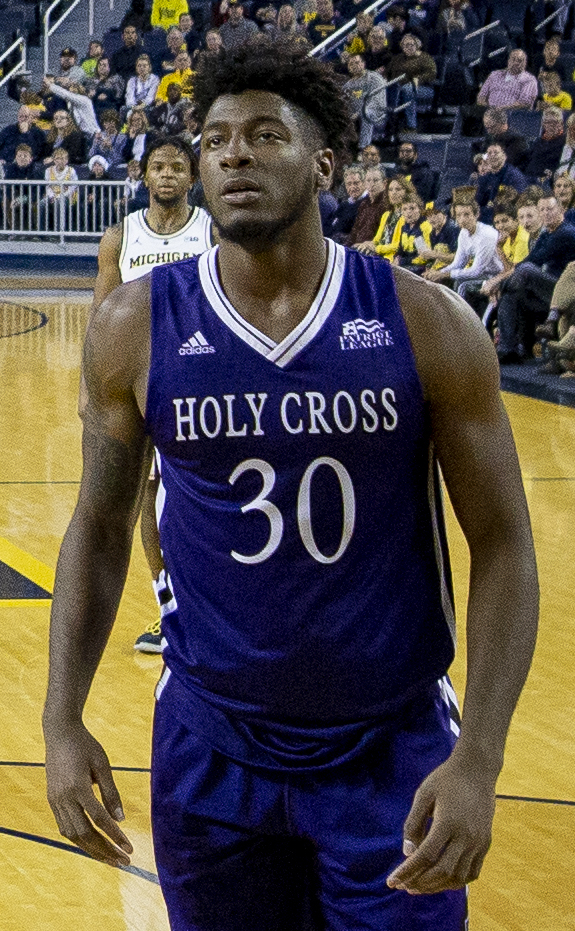
- Floyd in November 2018

Free Agent
- Position: Center

Personal information
- Born: June 27, 1997 (age 29) Parlin, New Jersey, U.S.
- Listed height: 6 ft 8 in (2.03 m)
- Listed weight: 226 lb (103 kg)

Career information
- High school: Sayreville War Memorial (Sayreville, New Jersey)
- College: Holy Cross (2015–2019)
- NBA draft: 2019: undrafted
- Playing career: 2019–present

Career history
- 2019–2020: Larisa
- 2020: Promitheas Patras
- 2020–2021: Hapoel Gilboa Galil
- 2021: Panathinaikos
- 2021–2022: Fenerbahçe Beko
- 2022–2023: Galatasaray Nef
- 2024: Yukatel Merkezefendi
- 2024: Bnei Herzliya
- 2024: Nagasaki Velca
- 2024–2025: Ibaraki Robots
- 2025–2026: Petkim Spor

Career highlights
- Turkish League champion (2022); Greek Super Cup winner (2020); Greek League blocks leader (2020); Israeli Basketball Premier League blocks leader (2021); 2× Patriot League Defensive Player of the Year (2018, 2019); 2× Patriot League All-Defensive Team (2018, 2019); Second-team All-Patriot League (2019); Third-team All-Patriot League (2018); Greek Super Cup winner (2021)

Jehyve Jamal Floyd (born June 27, 1997) is an American professional basketball player who last played for Petkim Spor of the Basketbol Süper Ligi (BSL). Floyd played college basketball for the Holy Cross Crusaders, with whom he was named Patriot League Defensive Player of the Year in both 2018 and 2019; in both years he led the league in blocked shots, as well as in shooting percentage from the field. He led the Greek Basket League in blocks in 2020, and the Israeli Basketball Premier League in blocks in 2021.

== High school career ==
Born and raised in Parlin, New Jersey, Floyd began his high school tenure at Sayreville War Memorial High School, in Sayreville, New Jersey for head coach John Wojcik. As a junior he averaged 10.5 points and 4.6 rebounds per game. As a senior he averaged 17.5 points, 10.7 rebounds, and 2.4 blocks per game. During his high school career, Floyd was selected as Sayreville's Breakout Player of the Year in 2014 and earned first team All-Conference honors while serving as team captain during his senior season.

== College career ==
After high school, Floyd committed to Holy Cross under head coach Bill Carmody. During his tenure with the Crusaders, he established himself as one of the best defensive players in the Patriot League, being inducted to the All-Defensive team two times. He was also selected as the Patriot League Defensive Player of the Year both in 2018 and 2019.

As a junior in 2017-18, Floyd averaged 12.2 points, 5.6 rebounds, 1.6 assists, and 2.2 blocked shots (leading the Patriot League) per game. He shot 66.8% from the field, which led the league and ranked fourth in the NCAA Division I. He was named 2017-18 All-Patriot - 3rd Team, 2017-18 Patriot All-Defense, and 2017-18 Patriot Defensive Player of the Year.

As a senior in 2018-19, Floyd averaged 12.9 points, 6.1 rebounds (8th in the Patriot League), 3.5 assists (8th), and 2.4 blocked shots (leading the league) per game. He shot 66.9% from the field, which led the league and ranked third in the NCAA Division I. He was named 2018-19 All-Patriot - 2nd Team, 2018-19 Patriot All-Defense, and 2018-19 Patriot Defensive Player of the Year.

He is the all-time leader in career field goal percentage (.656) in the Patriot League and also finished second all-time at Holy Cross in blocked shots (193).

== Professional career ==
After going undrafted in the 2019 NBA draft, Floyd joined MHP Riesen Ludwigsburg of the Basketball Bundesliga. He left the team before appearing in a single game.

=== Larisa ===
On September 13, 2019, he joined Larisa of the Greek Basket League. In 20 games, Floyd averaged 5.1 points, 5 rebounds, and led the league with both 2.2 blocks per game and total blocks (44).

=== Promitheas Patras ===
On July 30, 2020, he signed with Promitheas Patras of the same league, with whom he played 1.7 minutes in one game.

=== Hapoel Gilboa Galil ===
On October 12 of the same year, Floyd signed with Hapoel Gilboa Galil of the Israeli Basketball Premier League. He averaged 11.4 points and 7.4 rebounds per game. In 2020–21 he led the league in total blocks (62), was second in the Israel Basketball Premier League in blocked shots per game (1.7) and total rebounds (267), seventh in offensive rebounds per game (2.5), 10th in rebounds per game (7.4), and led the league in two-point shot percentage (74.2 per cent). He was voted the Eurobasket.com All-Balkan League Center of the Year in 2021.

=== Panathinaikos ===
On July 19, 2021, Floyd signed with EuroLeague club Panathinaikos, making his return to Greece.

=== Fenerbahçe Beko ===
On December 20, 2021, Floyd transferred to Turkish club Fenerbahçe for the rest of the season.

=== Galatasaray Nef ===
On June 24, 2022, he has signed a 1+1 year contract with Galatasaray Nef of the Basketbol Süper Ligi (BSL).

On July 3, 2022, the Phoenix Suns released their 2022 Las Vegas Summer League roster which included Floyd.

Galatasaray Nef announced on March 13, 2023, that the contract with Floyd was terminated by mutual agreement.

=== Prometey ===
On June 13, 2023, he signed with Prometey of the Latvian-Estonian Basketball League. He left the team on July 3, 2023, without playing a single game.

=== Yukatel Merkezefendi ===
On February 23, 2024, he signed with Yukatel Merkezefendi of the Basketbol Süper Ligi (BSL). He played 10 games for the team, averaging 8.5 points, 5.9 rebounds, and 1.4 blocks per game (5th in the league).

=== Bnei Herzliya ===
The 26-year-old Floyd returned to Israel and began playing for Bnei Herzliya of the Israeli Basketball Premier League on May 9, 2024.

=== Japan ===
On August 8, 2024, Floyd signed with the Nagasaki Velca of the B.League. On November 1, his contract was terminated.

On November 8, 2024, Floyd signed with the Ibaraki Robots of the B.League.

=== Petkim Spor ===
On July 16, 2025, he signed with Petkim Spor of the Basketbol Süper Ligi (BSL).

== Honours ==
- Greek Basketball Super Cup: (2021)
