= SS President Madison =

A number of steamships were named President Madison, including -

- SS President Madison (1920), an American ocean liner in service 1922–1938
- SS President Madison (1921), an American ocean liner in service 1940–1942
- SS President Madison (1946), an American ocean liner in service 1946–1972

== See also ==
- USS James Madison
- USCS Madison
- USS Madison
