= Sayreville Station, New Jersey =

Populated place in Middlesex County, New Jersey, US

- Unincorporated community
- Sayreville Station, Middlesex County, New Jersey
- Coordinates: 40°28′22″N 74°21′14″W
- Country: United States
- State: New Jersey
- County: Middlesex
- Borough: Sayreville
- Elevation: 13 ft (4.0 m)
- GNIS feature ID: 880286

Sayreville Station is a neighborhood in Sayreville in Middlesex County, in the U.S. state of New Jersey. Originally terminus of Raritan River Railroad's Sayreville Branch between Upper and Lower Sayreville. The spur was abandoned in 1978.

== See also ==
- List of neighborhoods in Sayreville, New Jersey
