= Myles Hartsfield =

American football player (born 1997)

Profile
- Position: Safety

Personal information
- Born: August 5, 1997 (age 29); Sayreville, New Jersey, U.S.
- Listed height: 5 ft 11 in (1.80 m)
- Listed weight: 210 lb (95 kg)

Career information
- High school: Sayreville
- College: Ole Miss (2016–2019)
- NFL draft: 2020: undrafted

Career history
- Carolina Panthers (2020–2022); San Francisco 49ers (2023)*
- * Offseason or practice squad member only

Career NFL statistics as of 2023
- Total tackles: 118
- Sacks: 1
- Pass deflections: 7
- Forced fumbles: 1
- Fumble recoveries: 2
- Stats at Pro Football Reference

Myles Hartsfield (born August 5, 1997) is an American professional football safety. He played college football at Ole Miss.

== Early life ==
Hartsfield grew up in Sayreville, New Jersey and attended Sayreville War Memorial High School, where he played football and was a triple jumper on the track team. He initially committed to play college football at Penn State, but his scholarship was revoked after the Sayreville football team was suspended due to a hazing scandal. After his senior year, he enrolled at East Coast Prep (ECP) for a postgraduate year. At East Coast Prep, Hartsfield recorded 29 tackles, seven pass break-ups and two interceptions and had over 200 receiving yards and four touchdowns on offense. At the end to the season he committed to play at Ole Miss over offers from UCLA and Boston College.

== College career ==
Hartsfield was a member of the Ole Miss Rebels for four seasons. As a freshman, he finished fifth on the team with 43 tackles and a pass defended and was named a third-team freshman All-American by Athlon Sports. The following year, he made 42 tackles with two interceptions and five passes defended. Hartsfield recorded 41 tackles and led the Rebels with seven passes defended in his junior season. As a senior, he recorded 41 tackles, 2.5 tackles for loss, and one sack with one interception and four passes broken up. Hartsfield finished his collegiate career with 167 career tackles, 8.0 tackles for loss, three interceptions and 17 passes broken up in 48 games played.

== Professional career ==
Pre-draft measurables
| Height | Weight |
|---|---|
| 5 ft 10 3/4 in (1.80 m) | 211 lb (96 kg) |
Values from Pro Day

=== Carolina Panthers ===
Hartsfield was signed by the Carolina Panthers as an undrafted free agent on April 25, 2020. He practiced both at safety and running back in training camp and made the active roster at the end of the preseason. Hartsfield made his NFL debut on September 13, 2020, in the season opener against the Las Vegas Raiders.

On September 13, 2021, Hartsfield was placed on injured reserve with a wrist injury. He was activated on November 6. In the season finale against the Tampa Bay Buccaneers, Hartsfield recorded his first career sack on Tom Brady.

=== San Francisco 49ers ===
On March 20, 2023, Hartsfield signed with the San Francisco 49ers. He was waived on August 29, 2023.
