= Madison Park =

Madison Park may refer to:

- Madison Square Park, in Manhattan, New York City
- Madison Park (Madison Street Park), a park in Hoboken, New Jersey
- Madison Park (Seattle), a park in Seattle, Washington
- Madison Park, Seattle, a neighborhood in Seattle
- Madison Park, Baltimore, a neighborhood in Baltimore, Maryland
- Madison Park (musical duo), an electronica band
- Madison Park, New Jersey
