= Sayreville Public Schools =

School district in Middlesex County, New Jersey, US

Address
- 150 Lincoln Street Sayreville, Middlesex County, New Jersey, 08879; United States
- Coordinates: 40.462809°N 74.344619°W

District information
- Grades: PreK-12
- Superintendent: Richard Labbe
- Business administrator: Erin Hill
- Schools: 9

Students and staff
- Enrollment: 6,407 (as of 2022–23)
- Faculty: 552.6 FTEs
- Student–teacher ratio: 11.6:1

Other information
- District Factor Group: DE
- Website: www.sayrevillek12.net
Ind.	Per pupil	District spending	Rank (*)	K-13 average	%± vs. average
1A	Total Spending	$15,475	8	$18,891	−18.1%
1	Budgetary Cost	11,361	3	14,783	−23.1%
2	Classroom Instruction	7,383	7	8,763	−15.7%
6	Support Services	1,606	9	2,392	−32.9%
8	Administrative Cost	1,095	6	1,485	−26.3%
10	Operations & Maintenance	1,005	2	1,783	−43.6%
13	Extracurricular Activities	216	38	268	−19.4%
16	Median Teacher Salary	52,003	3	64,043
Data from NJDoE 1964 Taxpayers' Guide to Education Spending. *Of K-13 districts with more than 3,500 students. Lowest spending=1; Highest=100,000

Sayreville Public Schools is a comprehensive community public school district that serves students from kindergarten to twelfth grade from Sayreville, in Middlesex County, in the U.S. state of New Jersey.

As of the 2022–23 school year, the district, comprised of nine schools, had an enrollment of 6,407 students and 552.6 classroom teachers (on an FTE basis), for a student–teacher ratio of 11.6:1.

The district is classified by the New Jersey Department of Education as being in District Factor Group "DE", the fifth-highest of eight groupings. District Factor Groups organize districts statewide to allow comparison by common socioeconomic characteristics of the local districts. From lowest socioeconomic status to highest, the categories are A, B, CD, DE, FG, GH, I and J.

== Schools ==
Schools in the district (with 2022–23 enrollment data from the National Center for Education Statistics) are:

Preschool

- Cheesequake School with 253 students in PreK
  - April Magistro, principal
- Jesse Selover Preschool with 225 students in PreK, offers a half-day program for children ages 3 to 5 years with mild to moderate disabilities, and a full-day program for children of the same age with moderate disabilities who require a greater degree of time and attention.
  - Nina Obryk, principal

Elementary schools

- Emma L. Arleth Elementary School with 486 students in grades K-3
  - Robert Preston, principal
- Dwight D. Eisenhower Elementary School with 479 students in grades K-3
  - Dale Rubino, principal
- Harry S. Truman Elementary School with 440 students in grades K-3
  - Amy Stueber, principal
- Woodrow Wilson Elementary School with 328 students in grades K-3
  - Timothy Byrne, principal
- Samsel Upper Elementary School with 838 students in grades 4-5
  - Stacy Coglianese, principal

Middle school

- Sayreville Middle School with 1,349 students in grades 6-8
  - Scott Nurnberger, principal

High school

- Sayreville War Memorial High School with 1,750 students in grades 9-12
  - Richard Gluchowski, principal

== Administration ==
Core members of the district's administration are:

- Richard Labbe, superintendent
- Erin Hill, business administrator and board secretary

== Board of education ==
The district's board of education is comprised of nine members who set policy and oversee the fiscal and educational operation of the district through its administration. As a Type II school district, the board's trustees are elected directly by voters to serve three-year terms of office on a staggered basis, with three seats up for election each year held (since 2013) as part of the November general election. The board appoints a superintendent to oversee the district's day-to-day operations and a business administrator to supervise the business functions of the district.
