= Mike Wasko =

American bobsledder

Personal information
- Nationality: American
- Born: June 9, 1964 (age 62) Bayonne, New Jersey, United States

Sport
- Sport: Bobsleigh

Mike Wasko (born June 9, 1964) is an American bobsledder. He competed in the four man event at the 1988 Winter Olympics.

Raised in Sayreville, New Jersey, Wasko competed in gymnastics and track at Sayreville War Memorial High School and was selected to the All State Team in both sports; before graduating in 1982; he was inducted into the school's hall of fame in 2005. He also competed in track during his collegiate career at Fairleigh Dickinson University.
