= Rhonda Rompola =

American college basketball coach

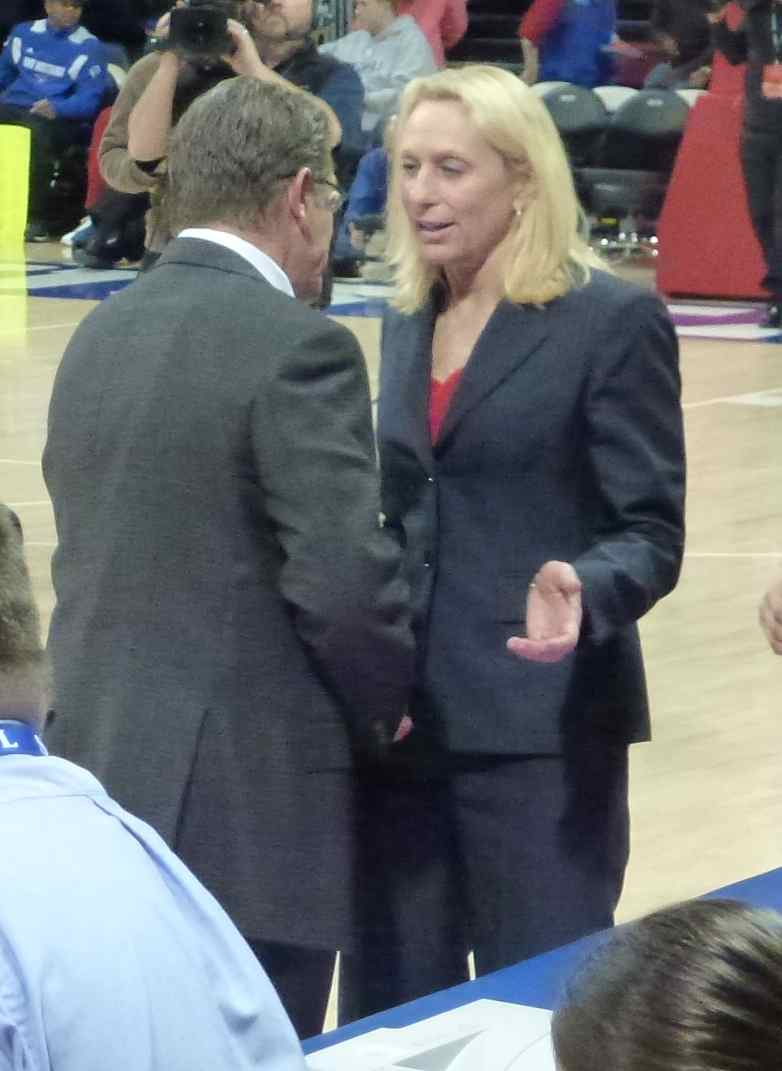

Biographical details
- Born: March 9, 1960 (age 66); Sayreville, New Jersey
- Education: SMU

Playing career
- 1979–1980: Old Dominion
- 1981–1983: SMU
- Position: Forward

Coaching career (HC unless noted)
- 1983–1991: SMU (asst.)
- 1991–2016: SMU

Head coaching record
- Overall: 438–318 (.579)
- Tournaments: 3–7 (NCAA); 1–5 (WNIT); 2–1 (NWIT)

Accomplishments and honors

Championships
- As a player: 2× AIAW (1979, 1980); As a head coach: WAC regular season (2000); WAC tournament (1999); 2× C-USA regular season (2009, 2013); C-USA tournament (2008)

Awards
- WAC Coach of the Year (1999)

Rhonda Lee Rompola (born March 9, 1960) is an American college basketball coach who was most recently the head women's basketball coach at Southern Methodist University (SMU) from 1991 to 2016.

== Early life and education ==
Rompola was born and raised in Sayreville, New Jersey. She graduated from Sayreville War Memorial High School in 1978. From 1978 to 1980, Rompola played basketball at Old Dominion University in Norfolk, Virginia, averaging 10.3 points, 4.3 rebounds, and 3.5 assists and was part of two AIAW championship teams. Rompola transferred to SMU in Dallas. After redshirting one season per NCAA transfer rules, Rompola played at forward at SMU from 1981 to 1983. With 21.3 points per game, Rompola was SMU's leading scorer in 1981–82. She graduated in 1983 with a business degree.

== Coaching career ==
From 1983 to 1991, Rompola was an assistant coach at SMU before being promoted to head coach.

In her first season as coach in 1991–92, she posted a 17–12 record, the team's first winning season since 1981–82 when she was a player. Overall, she posted a 439–317 (.581) record at SMU. In 1998, SMU won its first-ever WAC tournament title, as it defeated 4th-ranked Colorado State University in the final, and then 25th-ranked Toledo in the opening round of the NCAA tournament. In 1998 and 1999, Rompola guided the Mustangs to back-to-back 20-win seasons. She was named the 1999 WAC Coach of the year for her efforts. In 2007, SMU went 24–9, and finished second in Conference USA play with an 11–5 mark. Along with being SMU's all-time leader in coaching wins in any sport, she also earned an honorable mention on the all-time Old Dominion Lady Monarchs basketball team. She coached her 400th victory on February 21, 2013.

== Personal life ==
Previously married to Steven Haddock, Rompola married men's basketball coach Mike Dement in June 2007.

== Head coaching record ==
Record table
Season	Team	Overall	Conference	Standing	Postseason
SMU Mustangs (Southwest Conference) (1991–1996)
1991–92	SMU	17–12	7–7	T–4th	
1992–93	SMU	20–10	8–6	3rd	NWIT Runner-up
1993–94	SMU	18–9	8–6	4th	NCAA first round
1994–95	SMU	21–10	9–5	T–2nd	NCAA second round
1995–96	SMU	19–11	9–5	3rd	NCAA first round
SMU (SWC):		95–52 (.646)	41–29 (.586)		
SMU Mustangs (Western Athletic Conference) (1996–2005)
1996–97	SMU	19–11	11–5	3rd (Mountain)	
1997–98	SMU	21–8	11–3	T–2nd (Pacific)	NCAA first round
1998–99	SMU	20–11	11–3	2nd (Mountain)	NCAA second round
1999–2000	SMU	22–9	12–2	1st	NCAA second round
2000–01	SMU	17–12	11–5	3rd	
2001–02	SMU	12–18	6–12	7th	
2002–03	SMU	16–15	8–10	7th	
2003–04	SMU	13–15	9–9	5th	
2004–05	SMU	19–11	10–8	5th	WNIT first round
SMU (WAC):		159–110 (.591)	89–57 (.610)		
SMU Mustangs (Conference USA) (2005–2013)
2005–06	SMU	16–14	10–6	3rd	
2006–07	SMU	18–12	9–7	6th	
2007–08	SMU	24–9	11–5	2nd	NCAA first round
2008–09	SMU	20–12	12–4	1st	WNIT first round
2009–10	SMU	20–11	10–6	2nd	WNIT first round
2010–11	SMU	14–16	7–9	8th	
2011–12	SMU	14–17	6–10	T–9th	
2012–13	SMU	21–10	12–4	1st	WNIT first round
SMU (C-USA):		147–101 (.593)	77–51 (.602)		
SMU Mustangs (American Athletic Conference) (2013–2016)
2013–14	SMU	18–14	8–10	6th	WNIT second round
2014–15	SMU	7–23	3–15	10th	
2015–16	SMU	13–18	7–11	7th	
SMU (The American):		38–55 (.409)	18–36 (.333)		
Total:		438–318 (.579)			
National champion Postseason invitational champion Conference regular season champion Conference regular season and conference tournament champion Division regular season champion Division regular season and conference tournament champion Conference tournament champion
