= Melrose, New Jersey =

Populated place in Middlesex County, New Jersey, US

- Unincorporated community
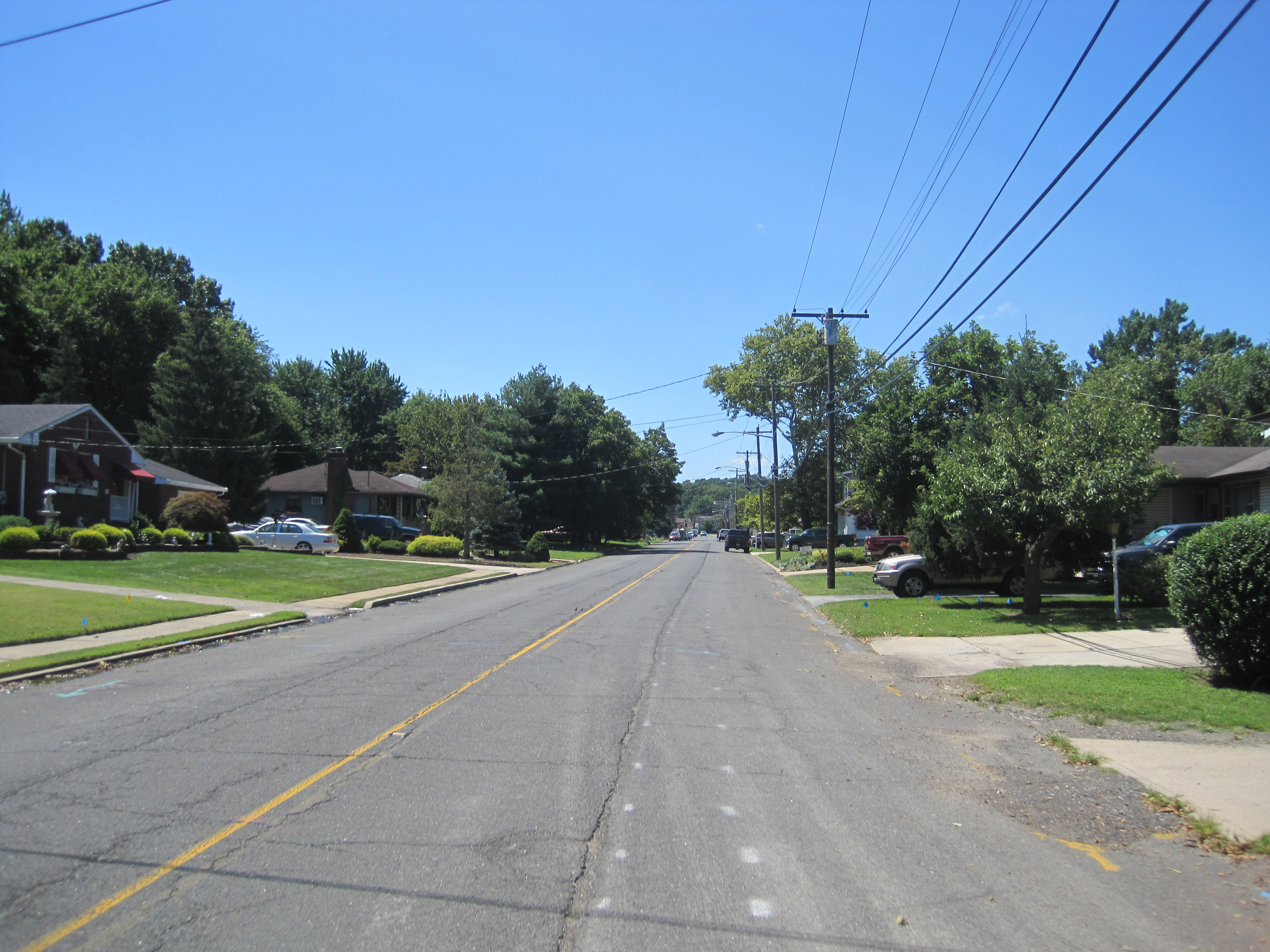
- Along Scott Avenue

- Melrose, Sayreville, Middlesex County, New Jersey
- Coordinates: 40°29′27″N 74°17′49″W
- Country: United States
- State: New Jersey
- County: Middlesex
- Borough: Sayreville
- Elevation: 33 ft (10 m)
- GNIS feature ID: 878253

Melrose is a neighborhood in Sayreville in Middlesex County, New Jersey, United States. Melrose was consolidated with Ernston, Morgan, and Sayre's Village under one municipal government in 1876, when the newly formed Township of Sayreville was created from approximately 14 square miles (36 km^{2}) of what was then South Amboy Township.

== See also ==
- List of neighborhoods in Sayreville, New Jersey
