= Lea Bayers Rapp =

American writer

- Born: Lea Bayers; July 19, 1946 (age 80); Brooklyn, New York City
- Education: Thomas Edison State College
- Occupation: writer
- Spouse: Stanley Rapp
- Children: Ilana Rapp, Justin Rapp
- Writing career
- Language: English
- Genres: non-fiction, children's fiction
- Notable works: Put your kid in show biz Mazel tov! The complete book of Jewish weddings

Lea Bayers Rapp (born July 19, 1946 in Brooklyn) is an American non-fiction and children's fiction writer. Among her books are "Put Your Kid in Show Biz" and "Mazel Tov! The Complete Book of Jewish Weddings." She also wrote for periodicals.

Lea Bayers was born into a Jewish family from Brooklyn. She holds a BA from Thomas Edison State College. In 2011, she lives in Sayreville, New Jersey.

== Books ==
- 1978 − Smiling Faces, a musical play for children with music by Claire Martin (Jobete Music Company)
- 1981 − Put your kid in show biz (Sterling Publishing)
- 1992 − The best public high schools: Where do kids get the best secondary education in New Jersey? (with 4 coauthors; Tomlinson Enterprises)
- 1993 − Life's little destruction book (St. Martin's Press)
- 2002 − Mazel tov! The complete book of Jewish weddings (Kensington Books)
