= Sayre and Fisher Reading Room =

- Sayre and Fisher Reading Room; Sayreville Hall
- U.S. National Register of Historic Places
- New Jersey Register of Historic Places
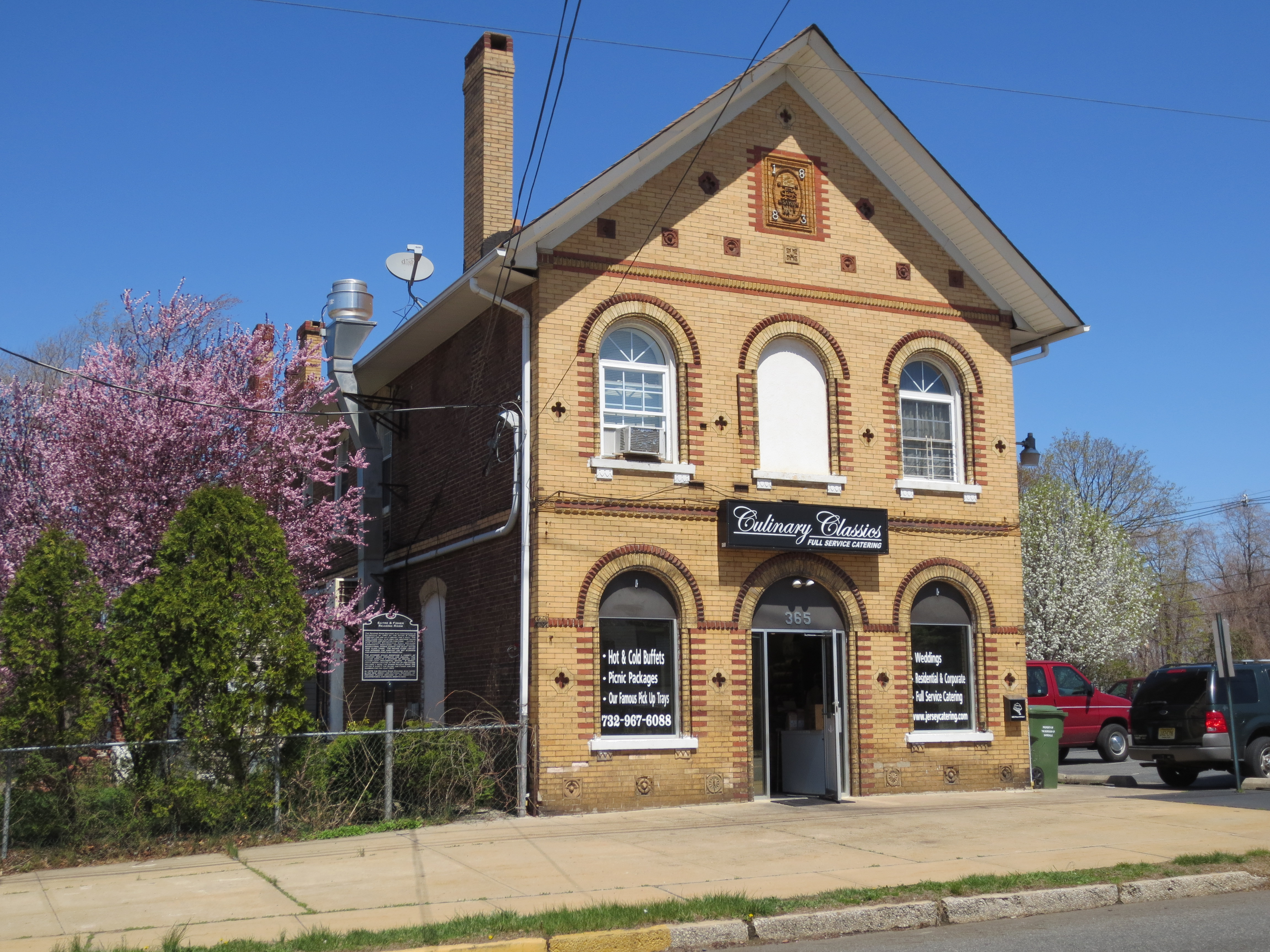

- Location within Middlesex County, New Jersey Location within New Jersey Location within the United States
- Location: Main Street and River Road; Sayreville, New Jersey
- Coordinates: 40°28′16″N 74°21′19″W
- Built: 1883
- NRHP reference No.: 79001511
- NJRHP No.: 1931

Significant dates
- Added to NRHP: September 12, 1979
- Designated NJRHP: July 5, 1979

The Sayre and Fisher Reading Room, in Sayreville, Middlesex County, New Jersey, United States, was constructed in 1883 for recreational use and for showcasing the Sayre and Fisher Brick Company ornamental products. Also known as Sayreville Hall, it was added to the New Jersey Register of Historic Places and National Register of Historic Places in 1979. It served as the town's unofficial library.

Sayre and Fisher Brick Company was established in 1850 by James R. Sayre, Jr., and Peter Fisher, and later became one of the USA's leading manufacturers of building brick, fire brick, and enamel brick. In 1876 the area around the village then known as Wood's Landing was renamed Sayreville, after the company's co-founder. It eventually acquired most factories along the Raritan River, and by 1905 operated a two-mile-long complex with 13 separate yards. By 1912, production reached 62 million bricks a year, providing employment for a large part of the local population, some of whom lived in company housing. The complex included a power plant, granary, bakery, slaughterhouse, coal yard, ice plant, general store, machine shop, and blacksmith shop. Among the structures built with bricks from the company are the Empire State Building, Rockefeller Center, the base of the Statue of Liberty, and the Brooklyn Academy of Music. Brick manufacturing declined in the Great Depression, but recovered and stayed profitable into the 1960s. The Sayre and Fisher plant closed in 1970. While most of the industrial buildings were razed, the reading room and some housing buildings remain. The water tower has been restored.

== See also ==
- List of the oldest buildings in New Jersey
- National Register of Historic Places listings in Middlesex County, New Jersey
