= Madison Avenue (disambiguation) =

Madison Avenue is a street in the borough of Manhattan in New York City

Madison Avenue can also refer to:

- Madison Avenue (Baltimore), a street in Baltimore, Maryland
- Madison Avenue (film), a film by H. Bruce Humberstone with Dana Andrews, Eleanor Parker and Jeanne Crain
- Madison Avenue (band), a dance music group from Australia

== See also ==
- Madison Avenue Line (disambiguation)
- Madison Avenue Grounds, a former baseball field in Baltimore
