= Madison College =

Madison College may refer to:

- James Madison University, Harrisonburg, Virginia, named Madison College 1938–77
- Madison Area Technical College, Madison, Wisconsin, branded as Madison College to distinguish from the Milwaukee Area Technical College
- Madison Business College, a former school in Madison, Wisconsin, 1858–1998
- Madison College (Mississippi), a former college for men, in Sharon, Mississippi, 1851–1872
- Madison College (Ohio), a former school in Madison Township, Guernsey County, Ohio, 1835–59
- Madison College (Pennsylvania), a former school in Uniontown, Pennsylvania, operated by the Methodist Episcopal Church

== See also ==
- James Madison College, a college of public affairs and international relations within Michigan State University in East Lansing, Michigan
- Hanover College, in Hanover, Indiana, was briefly known as Madison University in 1843–44
- Madison University, a non-accredited distance learning college located in Gulfport, Mississippi
- Colgate University, known as Madison College, 1846-1890
