= Madisonville =

Places named Madisonville in the United States include:

- Madisonville, Kentucky
- Madisonville, Louisiana
- Madisonville, a former town near Madison, Mississippi
- Madisonville, Missouri
- Madisonville, Cincinnati, Ohio
- Madisonville site, a prehistoric archaeological site near Mariemont, Ohio
- Madisonville, Tennessee
- Madisonville, Texas

== See also ==
- Nuka Hiva, which had a short-lived American settlement called Madisonville
