= Madison Avenue Line =

Madison Avenue Line refers to the following:

- Fourth and Madison Avenues Line, a former streetcar line in Manhattan, New York City, United States, replaced in 1936 by buses, now the Fifth and Madison Avenues Line (M1, M2, M3, and M4) buses, which are northbound on Madison Avenue
- the 16 Madison Avenue streetcar line in Baltimore, Maryland, converted to a bus line in 1956, now part of the Route 91 (MTA Maryland) bus line
- The Madison Avenue streetcar line that runs on a 2.2 mile track from midtown Memphis to Medical District just east of Downtown Memphis.
