= Madison (1855) =

American steamboat

History

United States
- Name: Madison
- Namesake: Madison, Florida
- Owner: James M. Tucker
- Launched: 1855
- Fate: Sank in 1863 on the Suwannee River at Troy Spring, Florida

Madison was a side-wheel steamer that was likely constructed in 1855 at New Albany, Indiana. The ship was acquired by Captain James M. Tucker, who named it after his hometown of Madison, Florida. The ship ran along the Suwannee River, delivering mail and trade goods to residents of the area. When the American Civil War erupted in 1861, Tucker entered Madison into Confederate service, turning the steamer into an ad hoc smuggling gunboat. That July, the ship was used by Major Whit Smith at the Cedar Keys to recapture four Confederate schooners under Union control. In September 1863, Tucker was ordered for service in Virginia, and before he left, he scuttled Madison at Troy Spring to prevent it being seized by the Union. In the following years, the ship's boilers, smokestacks, and cabin were salvaged, leaving the lower hull of the vessel embedded in the riverbed. The remains of the ship are still visible in the spring waters, and the wreck is a popular scuba and snorkel destination.
