= USCS Madison =

History

United States
- Name: Madison
- Namesake: James Madison (1751–1836), President of the United States (1809–1817), under whose administration Ferdinand Hassler (1770–1843) acquired books and instruments in Europe for the Survey of the Coast and in 1816 became its first superintendent and oversaw its first field work
- Acquired: 1850
- Commissioned: 1850
- Decommissioned: 1858

General characteristics
- Type: Survey ship (schooner)
- Length: 78.8 ft (24.0 m)
- Beam: 19.6 ft (6.0 m)
- Draft: 9.3 ft (2.8 m)
- Propulsion: Sails
- Sail plan: Schooner-rigged

USCS Madison was a schooner that served as a survey ship in the United States Coast Survey from 1850 to 1858. She was named for Founding Father and U.S. president James Madison.

Madison's origins are obscure, but the Coast Survey acquired her in 1850 and placed her in service along the United States East Coast, where she spent her entire Coast Survey career. She was retired in 1858.

== See also ==
- USS Madison
- USS James Madison
- SS President Madison
