= USS Madison =

USS Madison may refer to the following ships of the United States Navy:

- USS Madison (1812), was a 22-gun corvette launched in 1812 on Lake Ontario and served in the War of 1812
- USS Madison (1832), was a Van Buren-class schooner built in 1832 for United States Revenue Service and was returned to the Treasury Department and later (1850) to the United States Coastal Survey.
- USS Madison (DD-425), was a Benson-class destroyer launched 20 October 1939 and struck 1 June 1968

== See also ==
- USCS Madison
- USS James Madison
- SS President Madison
