= Madison Heights =

Madison Heights may refer to several communities in the United States:

- Madison Heights, Michigan
- Madison Heights, Virginia
- Madison Heights, Pasadena, California
- Madison Heights, a region within Madison, New Jersey
