= Parlin, New Jersey =

Place in Middlesex County, New Jersey, United States

- Unincorporated community
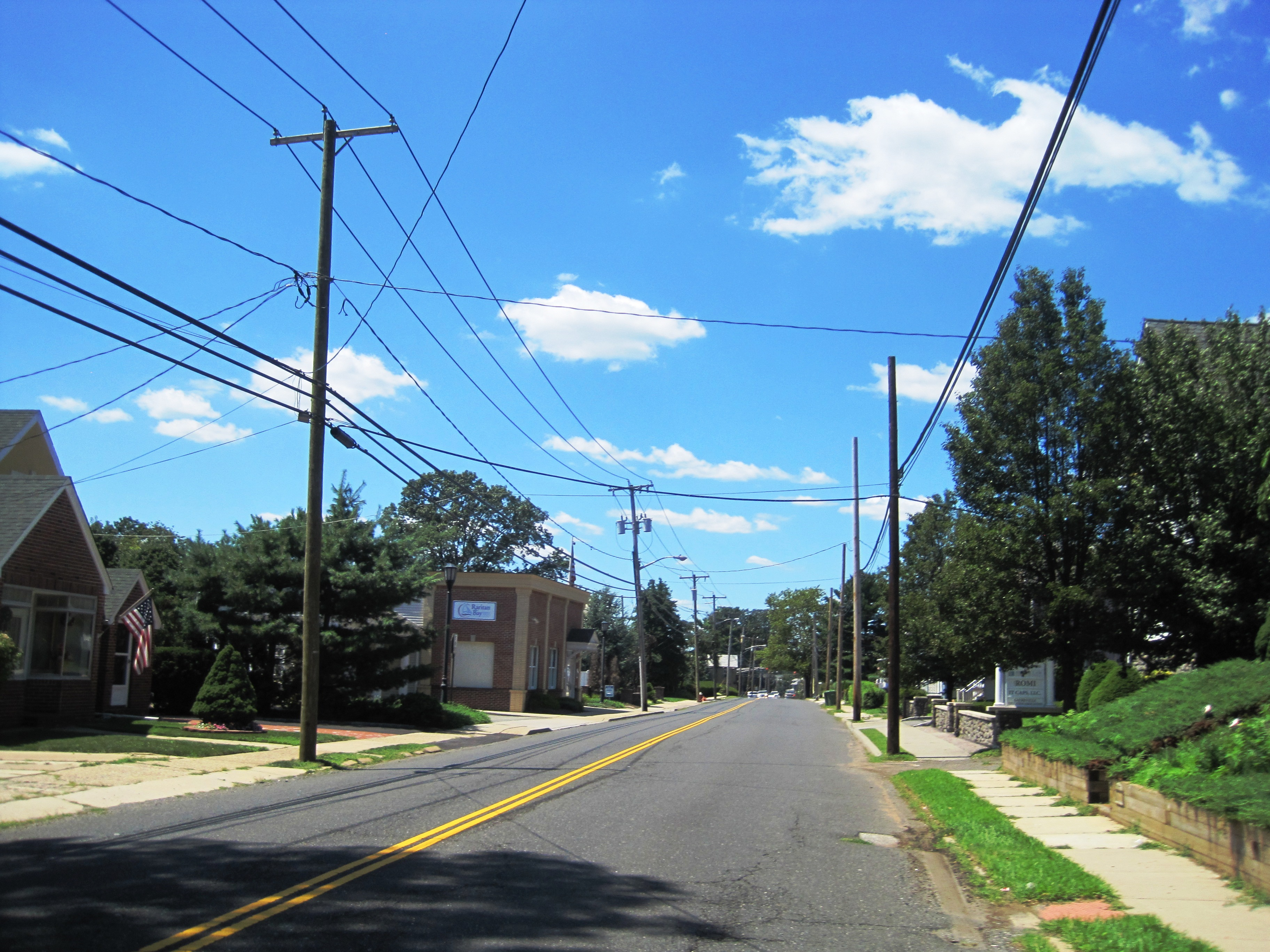
- Along Washington Road (CR 535)

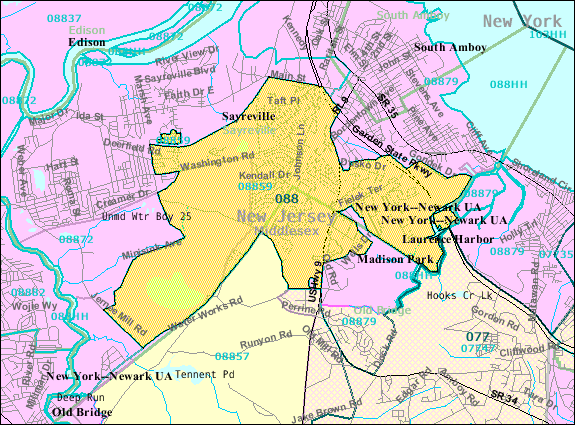
- United States Census Bureau map of Parlin, New Jersey

- Parlin's location in Middlesex County (Inset: Middlesex County in New Jersey) Parlin (New Jersey) Parlin (the United States)
- Coordinates: 40°27′43″N 74°20′18″W
- Country: United States
- State: New Jersey
- County: Middlesex
- Township and Borough: Old Bridge and Sayreville
- Elevation: 135 ft (41 m)
- ZIP code: 08859
- GNIS feature ID: 0879141

Parlin is an unincorporated community located within Old Bridge Township and Sayreville Borough in Middlesex County, New Jersey, United States. The area is served as United States Postal Service ZIP Code 08859.

As of the 2000 United States census, the population for ZIP Code Tabulation Area (ZCTA) 08859 was 20,129.

== Notable people ==
People who were born in, residents of, or otherwise closely associated with Parlin include:

- Jon Bon Jovi (born 1962), lead singer of the rock band Bon Jovi
- Junot Díaz (born 1968), Dominican-American writer
- Jehyve Floyd (born 1997), basketball player in the Israeli Basketball Premier League.
- Tom Kelly (born 1950), former manager for the Minnesota Twins
- Kevin Mulvey (born 1985), former pitcher for the Minnesota Twins and Arizona Diamondbacks

== See also ==
- List of neighborhoods in Sayreville, New Jersey
