= Sayreville, New Jersey =

Borough in Middlesex County, New Jersey, US

- Borough
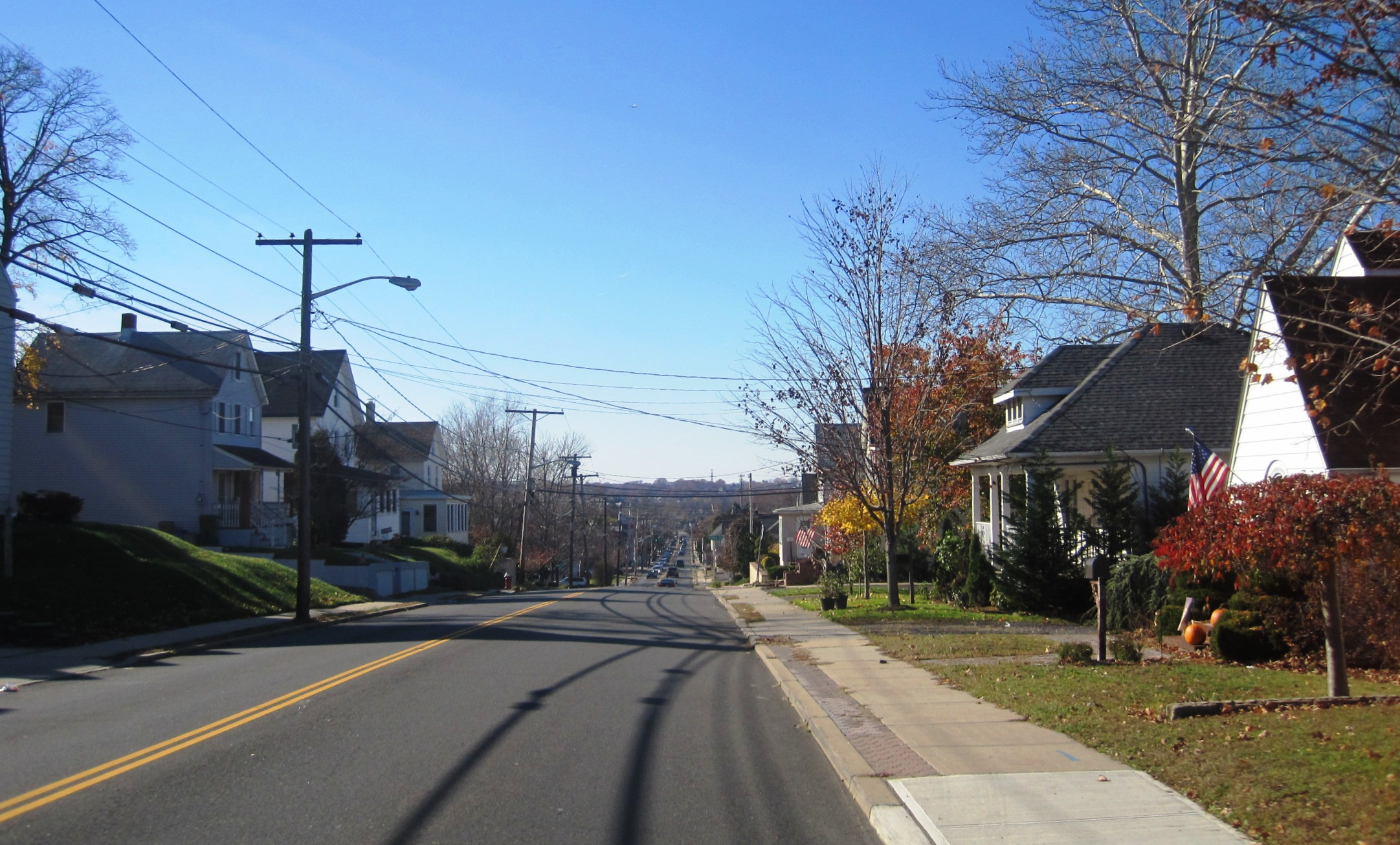
- Washington Road (CR 535) in Sayreville descending into the South River valley

- Seal
- Interactive map of Sayreville, New Jersey
- Location in Middlesex County Location in New Jersey Location in the United States
- Coordinates: 40°27′45″N 74°19′30″W
- Country: United States
- State: New Jersey
- County: Middlesex
- Incorporated: April 6, 1876 (as township)
- Reincorporated: April 29, 1919 (as borough)
- Named for: James R. Sayre Jr.

Government
  - Type: Borough
  - Body: Borough Council
  - Mayor: Kennedy O'Brien (R, term ends December 31, 2027)
  - Administrator: Glenn Skarzynski
  - Municipal clerk: Jessica Morelos

Area
  - Total: 18.66 sq mi (48.33 km^{2})
  - Land: 15.83 sq mi (41.00 km^{2})
  - Water: 2.83 sq mi (7.34 km^{2}) 15.24%
  - Rank: 153rd of 565 in state 8th of 25 in county
- Elevation: 10 ft (3.0 m)

Population
  - Total: 46,787
  - Estimate (2023): 45,496
  - Rank: 47th of 565 in state 10th of 25 in county
  - Density: 2,864.5/sq mi (1,106.0/km^{2})
  - Rank: 227th of 565 in state 19th of 25 in county
- Time zone: UTC−05:00 (Eastern (EST))
  - Summer (DST): UTC−04:00 (Eastern (EDT))
- ZIP Codes: 08871, 08872 - Sayreville 08859 - Parlin; 08879 - South Amboy
- Area codes: 908, 732 and 848
- FIPS code: 342365790
- GNIS feature ID: 0885386
- Website: www.sayreville.com

Sayreville is a borough in Middlesex County, in the U.S. state of New Jersey, in the New York metropolitan area. Sayreville is within the heart of the Raritan Valley region, located on the south banks of the Raritan River, and also located on the Raritan Bay. As of the 2020 United States census, the borough's population was 45,345, an increase of 2,641 (+6.2%) from the 2010 census count of 42,704, which in turn reflected an increase of 2,327 (+5.8%) from the 40,377 counted in the 2000 census.

Sayreville was originally incorporated as a township on April 6, 1876, from portions of South Amboy Township. On April 2, 1919, the borough was reincorporated as the Borough of Sayreville and ratified by a referendum held on April 29, 1919.

== History ==
Native Americans were the first settlers of Sayreville. Tribes of the Navesink lived along the South River where Jernee Mill Road is located today. This was noted on a 1656 New Netherland map by Adriaen van der Donck, a Dutch surveyor and map maker. Attempting to buy land from the Native Americans, European settlers travelled up the Raritan River in 1663. During the 20th century, amateur archaeologists found thousands of Indian artifacts at the location shown on the map.

Predating the incorporation of Sayreville, the Morgan Inn (later known as the Old Spye Inn) was established in 1703 in what is now the Morgan section of Sayreville. Charles Morgan III and his descendants, including Major General James Morgan and Lieutenant Nicholas Morgan, played significant roles in the Revolutionary War. The Morgan family lived in the area for over 200 years and many family members, including Evertsons, are buried in the privately owned Morgan Cemetery, which overlooks Raritan Bay. The Morgans were said to be related to the famous pirate, Captain Henry Morgan, who is said to have visited the Inn on more than one occasion, although this would have been impossible, considering Morgan died in Jamaica in 1688 and the Old Spye Inn wasn't built until 1703.

It was from an episode during the Revolutionary War that the Morgan Inn gained its new name, the Old Spye Inn. According to local legends, a local British loyalist, Abe Mussey, was captured by Continental Army troops in 1777 while signaling to British ships in Raritan Bay. He was tried as a spy at the Inn, convicted in a one-day trial, and sentenced to death by hanging. Mussey's execution was carried out using a tree near the Inn's entrance. Mussey was reported to be buried behind the Inn in an unmarked grave. The Inn was destroyed by fire in 1976, but its ruins remain on the National Register of Historic Places.

Originally known as Roundabout (for the river bends in the area) and then as Wood's Landing, the community was renamed in the 1860s for James R. Sayre Jr. of Newark, who co-founded Sayre and Fisher Brick Company in the 1850s together with Peter Fisher. It was one of the many companies that took advantage of the extensive clay deposits that supported the brick industry from the early 19th century until 1970. From its inception, Sayre & Fisher quickly grew into one of the largest brick-making companies in the world. Production grew from 54 million bricks annually in 1878, to 178 million bricks a year in 1913, and had reached a total of 6.2 billion bricks in the 100 years through its centennial in 1950.

In 1898, DuPont began production of gunpowder at its plant on Deerfield Road, and later off Washington Road. The company later built additional facilities in Sayreville for the production of paint and photo products.

At one time the Raritan River Railroad passed through Sayreville and had several spurs to service Sayre & Fisher and other local industries. A train running on the line was featured in "The Juggernaut," a 1914 episode of the silent movie serial The Perils of Pauline. The episode was staged on the line, including the construction of a bridge over Ducks Nest Pond in Sayreville. The fishing pond is located in the back of Bailey Park, near the DuPont and Hercules factories.

In 1918 during World War I, Sayreville was heavily damaged by TNT explosions at the Gillespie Shell Loading Plant. The disaster killed dozens and injured hundreds of local victims, damaged hundreds of buildings, required an emergency declaration of martial law, and scattered wide areas of ammunition remnants that continue to surface occasionally.

Sayreville's clay deposits have earned scientific notice as one of the world's major sources of museum-quality fossils found in amber (see New Jersey amber). This prehistoric tree resin managed to encase over a hundred species of insects and plants from approximately 90 million years ago, when Sayreville had a tropical climate. The fossils have been extensively researched and published by David Grimaldi, curator of invertebrate zoology at the American Museum of Natural History.

== Geography ==
According to the United States Census Bureau, the borough had a total area of 18.68 square miles (48.37 km^{2}), including 15.83 square miles (41.00 km^{2}) of land and 2.85 square miles (7.37 km^{2}) of water (15.24%).

The borough is located on the southern bank of the Raritan River across from Woodbridge Township and Perth Amboy, and is bordered on the southwest and south by Old Bridge Township. The borough also borders East Brunswick, Edison, South Amboy, and South River in Middlesex County, and Staten Island in New York City.

Low-lying areas near the Raritan River are subject to flooding associated with storm surges. The borough is approximately 24 miles (39 km) southwest of Lower Manhattan, 4 miles (6.4 km) southwest of Staten Island and 57 miles (92 km) northeast of Philadelphia. Area codes 908, 732 and 848 are used in Sayreville.

Sayreville uses four ZIP Codes; 08871 and 08872 are post offices located in the borough itself, while 08879 is the South Amboy ZIP Code serving the Morgan and Melrose sections of Sayreville, South Amboy, and the Laurence Harbor neighborhood of Old Bridge Township. ZIP Code 08859 is the Parlin post office, which serves adjoining portions of Sayreville and Old Bridge Township.

There are several distinct neighborhoods in Sayreville. Unincorporated communities, localities and place names within the borough include: Crossmans, Ernston, Gillespie, Laurel Park, MacArthur Manor, Melrose, Morgan, Morgan Heights, Phoenix, Runyon, Sayre Woods, Sayreville Junction, and Sayreville Station.

== Climate ==
Sayreville has a humid subtropical climate (Cfa). Sayreville usually has hot and humid summers, cool to cold winters, and precipitation is spread through the year. The average in July is 76.1 °F (24.5 °C) and thunderstorms are common during the spring and summer. Sayreville also holds the record for the hottest temperature in the state of New Jersey, recorded on July 10, 1936, at 110 °F (43 °C) in Runyon, a neighborhood of Sayreville.

== Demographics ==
Historical population
Census	Pop.	Note	%±
1880	1,930		—
1890	3,509		81.8%
1900	4,155		18.4%
1910	5,783		39.2%
1920	7,181		24.2%
1930	8,658		20.6%
1940	8,186		−5.5%
1950	10,338		26.3%
1960	22,553		118.2%
1970	32,508		44.1%
1980	29,969		−7.8%
1990	34,986		16.7%
2000	40,377		15.4%
2010	42,704		5.8%
2020	45,345		6.2%
2023 (est.)	45,496	▲	0.3%
Population sources: 1880–1920; 1880–1890 1890–1910; 1910–1930 1940–2000; 2000 2010 2020

=== 2020 census ===
As of the 2020 census, Sayreville had a population of 45,345. The median age was 40.1 years. 21.0% of residents were under the age of 18 and 14.7% of residents were 65 years of age or older. For every 100 females there were 95.8 males, and for every 100 females age 18 and older there were 93.4 males age 18 and older.

100.0% of residents lived in urban areas, while 0.0% lived in rural areas.

There were 16,910 households in Sayreville, of which 32.9% had children under the age of 18 living in them. Of all households, 51.7% were married-couple households, 17.2% were households with a male householder and no spouse or partner present, and 25.1% were households with a female householder and no spouse or partner present. About 23.5% of all households were made up of individuals and 8.9% had someone living alone who was 65 years of age or older.

There were 17,695 housing units, of which 4.4% were vacant. The homeowner vacancy rate was 1.2% and the rental vacancy rate was 6.2%.

Racial composition as of the 2020 census
Race	Number	Percent
White	23,960	52.8%
Black or African American	6,024	13.3%
American Indian and Alaska Native	140	0.3%
Asian	7,649	16.9%
Native Hawaiian and Other Pacific Islander	15	0.0%
Some other race	3,176	7.0%
Two or more races	4,381	9.7%
Hispanic or Latino (of any race)	7,868	17.4%

=== 2010 census ===
The 2010 United States census counted 42,704 people, 15,636 households, and 11,414 families in the borough. The population density was 2,695.7 per square mile (1,040.8/km^{2}). There were 16,393 housing units at an average density of 1,034.8 per square mile (399.5/km^{2}). The racial makeup was 67.04% (28,630) White, 10.71% (4,573) Black or African American, 0.23% (100) Native American, 16.12% (6,882) Asian, 0.04% (18) Pacific Islander, 3.50% (1,495) from other races, and 2.36% (1,006) from two or more races. Hispanic or Latino of any race were 12.31% (5,258) of the population.

Of the 15,636 households, 33.0% had children under the age of 18; 55.7% were married couples living together; 12.4% had a female householder with no husband present and 27.0% were non-families. Of all households, 22.4% were made up of individuals and 8.0% had someone living alone who was 65 years of age or older. The average household size was 2.72 and the average family size was 3.22.

22.6% of the population were under the age of 18, 8.0% from 18 to 24, 29.0% from 25 to 44, 28.3% from 45 to 64, and 12.1% who were 65 years of age or older. The median age was 38.6 years. For every 100 females, the population had 95.2 males. For every 100 females ages 18 and older there were 92.4 males.

The Census Bureau's 2006–2010 American Community Survey showed that (in 2010 inflation-adjusted dollars) median household income was $71,808 (with a margin of error of +/− $3,796) and the median family income was $84,929 (+/− $6,096). Males had a median income of $63,523 (+/− $3,061) versus $46,180 (+/− $3,434) for females. The per capita income for the borough was $32,259 (+/− $1,187). About 4.4% of families and 5.5% of the population were below the poverty line, including 8.2% of those under age 18 and 4.6% of those age 65 or over.

=== 2000 census ===
As of the 2000 United States census there were 40,377 people, 14,955 households, and 10,917 families residing in the borough. The population density was 2,539.4 inhabitants per square mile (980.5/km^{2}). There were 15,235 housing units at an average density of 958.1 per square mile (369.9/km^{2}). The racial makeup of the borough was 76.47% White, 8.62% African American, 0.13% Native American, 10.56% Asian, 0.02% Pacific Islander, 2.12% from other races, and 2.08% from two or more races. Hispanic or Latino people of any race were 7.29% of the population.

There were 14,955 households, out of which 34.3% had children under the age of 18 living with them, 57.5% were married couples living together, 11.1% had a female householder with no husband present, and 27.0% were non-families. 22.3% of all households were made up of individuals, and 8.7% had someone living alone who was 65 years of age or older. The average household size was 2.68 and the average family size was 3.17.

In the borough the population was spread out, with 23.6% under the age of 18, 7.3% from 18 to 24, 34.2% from 25 to 44, 22.5% from 45 to 64, and 12.4% who were 65 years of age or older. The median age was 36 years. For every 100 females, there were 96.3 males. For every 100 females age 18 and over, there were 92.0 males.

The median income for a household in the borough was $58,919, and the median income for a family was $66,266. Males had a median income of $47,427 versus $35,151 for females. The per capita income for the borough was $24,736. About 3.4% of families and 4.7% of the population were below the poverty line, including 6.1% of those under age 18 and 5.3% of those age 65 or over.

== Government ==
=== Local government ===
Sayreville is governed under the borough form of New Jersey municipal government, which is used in 218 municipalities (of the 564) statewide, making it the most common form of government in New Jersey. The governing body is comprised of the mayor and the borough council, with all positions elected at-large on a partisan basis as part of the November general election. The mayor is elected directly by the voters to a four-year term of office. The borough council is comprised of six members elected to serve three-year terms on a staggered basis, with two seats coming up for election each year in a three-year cycle. The borough form of government used by Sayreville is a "weak mayor / strong council" government in which council members act as the legislative body with the mayor presiding at meetings and voting only in the event of a tie. The mayor can veto ordinances subject to an override by a two-thirds majority vote of the council. The mayor makes committee and liaison assignments for council members, and most appointments are made by the mayor with the advice and consent of the council.

As of 2024, the mayor of Sayreville is Republican Kennedy O'Brien, whose term of ends December 31, 2027. Members of the Borough Council are Herve Blemur (D, 2028), Michael Colaci (R, 2026), Alberto Rios (D, 2028), Stanley "Stash" Synarski (R, 2027) and John Zebrowski (R, 2026), who serves as Council President.

Starting in January 2024, the Mayor's seat and the Borough Council were all held by Republicans, following a clean sweep in the November 2023 elections, marking the first time in the Borough's history that all seats on the local governing body are held by Republicans.

Republican Eunice Dwumfour, who had taken office in January 2021 for a three-year term, was found dead in her car in February 2023, the victim of a shooting.

In January 2020, Dave McGill was selected from a list of three candidates nominated by the Democratic municipal committee to complete the term expiring in December 2020 that had been held by Victoria Kilpatrick until she left office to take office as mayor.

In December 2018, the borough council selected former councilmember Dave McGill from a list of three candidates nominated by the Democratic municipal committee to fill the seat expiring in December 2019 that had been held by Ricci Melendez until he resigned from office to focus his time on his business.

==== Emergency services ====
Sayreville's EMS-Rescue System is operated by a combination paid-volunteer system. Coverage is split between Hackensack Meridian Health JFK EMS and an all-volunteer township membership. The Sayreville Emergency Squad was founded in 1936 and provides EMS-Rescue Service with its sister Squad, Morgan First Aid. Both squads provide Emergency medical services, Motor Vehicle Extrication, Boat and Water Rescue, Search and Rescue, and any other rescue function needed. As one of the few completely volunteer first aid squads remaining in central New Jersey, they provide these services free to the citizens of Sayreville.

Sayreville also has an all-volunteer fire department. It has four fire companies, Sayreville Engine Company #1, Melrose Hose Company #1, Morgan Hose & Chemical Company #1 and President Park Fire Company #1, which respond to as many as 1,100 calls per year.

Sayreville operates an all-volunteer auxiliary police, which assists the police department with night patrols, Sunday church crossings and various borough events. They are also called into action in the event of large-scale borough emergencies where the police department is stressed for manpower.

=== Federal, state and county representation ===
Sayreville is located in the 6th Congressional District and is part of New Jersey's 19th state legislative district.

For the 119th United States Congress, New Jersey's 6th congressional district is represented by Frank Pallone (D, Long Branch). New Jersey is represented in the United States Senate by Democrats Cory Booker (Newark, term ends 2027) and Andy Kim (Moorestown, term ends 2031).

For the 2026–2027 session, the 19th legislative district of the New Jersey Legislature is represented in the State Senate by Joe F. Vitale (D, Woodbridge Township) and in the General Assembly by Craig Coughlin (D, Woodbridge Township) and Yvonne Lopez (D, Perth Amboy).

Middlesex County is governed by a Board of County Commissioners, whose seven members are elected at-large on a partisan basis to serve three-year terms of office on a staggered basis, with either two or three seats coming up for election each year as part of the November general election. At an annual reorganization meeting held in January, the board selects from among its members a commissioner director and deputy director. As of 2025, Middlesex County's Commissioners (with party affiliation, term-end year, and residence listed in parentheses) are:

Director Ronald G. Rios (D, Carteret, 2027), Deputy Director Shanti Narra (D, North Brunswick, 2027), Claribel A. "Clary" Azcona-Barber (D, New Brunswick, 2025), Charles Kenny (D, Woodbridge Township, 2025), Leslie Koppel (D, Monroe Township, 2026), Chanelle Scott McCullum (D, Piscataway, 2025) and Charles E. Tomaro (D, Edison, 2026).

Constitutional officers are: Clerk Nancy Pinkin (D, 2025, East Brunswick), Sheriff Mildred S. Scott (D, 2025, Piscataway) and Surrogate Claribel Cortes (D, 2026; North Brunswick).

=== Politics ===
As of March 2011, there were a total of 24,248 registered voters in Sayreville, of which 9,394 (38.7%) were registered as Democrats, 2,778 (11.5%) were registered as Republicans and 12,053 (49.7%) were registered as unaffiliated. There were 23 voters registered as Libertarians or Greens.

United States presidential election results for Sayreville
Year	Republican		Democratic		Third party(ies)	
Year	No.	%	No.	%	No.	%
2024	11,018	52.06%	9,549	45.12%	597	2.82%
2020	9,624	46.05%	10,965	52.46%	311	1.49%
2016	8,611	47.66%	8,892	49.21%	565	3.13%
2012	6,394	40.16%	9,362	58.80%	167	1.05%
2008	7,839	44.90%	9,392	53.79%	228	1.31%
2004	7,614	47.87%	8,147	51.22%	144	0.91%
2000	5,564	40.04%	7,787	56.03%	546	3.93%

In the 2012 presidential election, Democrat Barack Obama received 58.8% of the vote (9,362 cast), ahead of Republican Mitt Romney with 40.2% (6,394 votes), and other candidates with 1.0% (167 votes), among the 16,040 ballots cast by the borough's 24,804 registered voters (117 ballots were spoiled), for a turnout of 64.7%. In the 2008 presidential election, Democrat Barack Obama received 53.3% of the vote (9,392 cast), ahead of Republican John McCain with 44.5% (7,839 votes) and other candidates with 1.3% (228 votes), among the 17,608 ballots cast by the borough's 24,673 registered voters, for a turnout of 71.4%. In the 2004 presidential election, Democrat John Kerry received 51.0% of the vote (8,147 ballots cast), outpolling Republican George W. Bush with 47.7% (7,614 votes) and other candidates with 0.6% (144 votes), among the 15,963 ballots cast by the borough's 22,510 registered voters, for a turnout percentage of 70.9. In the 2024 presidential election, Republican Donald Trump won Sayreville against Democrat Kamala Harris with 52.1% percent of the vote, flipping the borough that had voted reliably Democratic since at least 2004. He had also achieved the most votes compared to all other Republican candidates, including himself in both 2016 and 2020, since the same year. Kamala Harris lost while carrying the smallest percentage of the vote, 45.1%, that any Democrat had earned since at least 2004.

Gubernatorial election results for Sayreville
Year	Republican		Democratic		Third party(ies)	
Year	No.	%	No.	%	No.	%
2025	7,077	45.29%	8,438	54.00%	111	0.71%
2021	6,429	53.26%	5,530	45.82%	111	0.92%
2017	4,617	48.09%	4,752	49.50%	231	2.41%
2013	6,199	64.38%	3,328	34.56%	102	1.06%
2009	5,952	53.48%	4,263	38.31%	914	8.21%
2005	4,108	40.46%	5,149	50.71%	897	8.83%

In the 2013 gubernatorial election, Republican Chris Christie received 64.4% of the vote (6,199 cast), ahead of Democrat Barbara Buono with 34.6% (3,328 votes), and other candidates with 1.1% (102 votes), among the 9,780 ballots cast by the borough's 25,151 registered voters (151 ballots were spoiled), for a turnout of 38.9%. In the 2009 gubernatorial election, Republican Chris Christie received 52.9% of the vote (5,952 ballots cast), ahead of Democrat Jon Corzine with 37.9% (4,263 votes), Independent Chris Daggett with 6.8% (766 votes) and other candidates with 1.3% (148 votes), among the 11,242 ballots cast by the borough's 24,033 registered voters, yielding a 46.8% turnout.

United States Senate election results for Sayreville1
Year	Republican		Democratic		Third party(ies)	
Year	No.	%	No.	%	No.	%
2024	9,578	48.31%	9,521	48.02%	727	3.67%
2018	6,458	46.82%	6,914	50.13%	420	3.05%
2012	5,781	38.72%	8,891	59.54%	260	1.74%
2006	4,144	43.75%	4,928	52.02%	401	4.23%

United States Senate election results for Sayreville2
Year	Republican		Democratic		Third party(ies)	
Year	No.	%	No.	%	No.	%
2020	9,037	44.44%	10,845	53.34%	451	2.22%
2014	3,370	44.21%	4,149	54.43%	103	1.35%
2013	2,693	48.12%	2,833	50.62%	71	1.27%
2008	6,816	42.52%	8,884	55.42%	330	2.06%

== Education ==
The Sayreville Public Schools serve students in pre-kindergarten through twelfth grade. As of the 2022–23 school year, the district, comprised of nine schools, had an enrollment of 6,407 students and 552.6 classroom teachers (on an FTE basis), for a student–teacher ratio of 11.6:1. Schools in the district (with 2022–23 enrollment data from the National Center for Education Statistics) are Cheesequake School with 253 students in PreK, Jesse Selover Preschool with 225 students in PreK (in addition to programs for children with disabilities), Emma L. Arleth Elementary School with 486 students in grades K-3, Dwight D. Eisenhower Elementary School with 479 students in grades K-3, Harry S. Truman Elementary School with 440 students in grades K-3, Woodrow Wilson Elementary School with 328 students in grades K-3, Samsel Upper Elementary School with 838 students in grades 4-5, Sayreville Middle School with 1,349 students in grades 6-8 and Sayreville War Memorial High School with 1,750 students in grades 9-12.

Eighth grade students from all of Middlesex County are eligible to apply to attend the high school programs offered by the Middlesex County Magnet Schools, a county-wide vocational school district that offers full-time career and technical education at its schools in East Brunswick, Edison, Perth Amboy, Piscataway and Woodbridge Township, with no tuition charged to students for attendance.

St. Stanislaus Kostka School, which opened in 1915 on land donated by the Sayre and Fisher Brick Company, is a PreK–8 Catholic school that operates under the supervision of the Roman Catholic Diocese of Metuchen. Our Lady of the Victories School, which had opened in 1889, closed at the end of the 2021–22 school year in the face of rising deficits and a decade-long decline in enrollment.

== Redevelopment ==
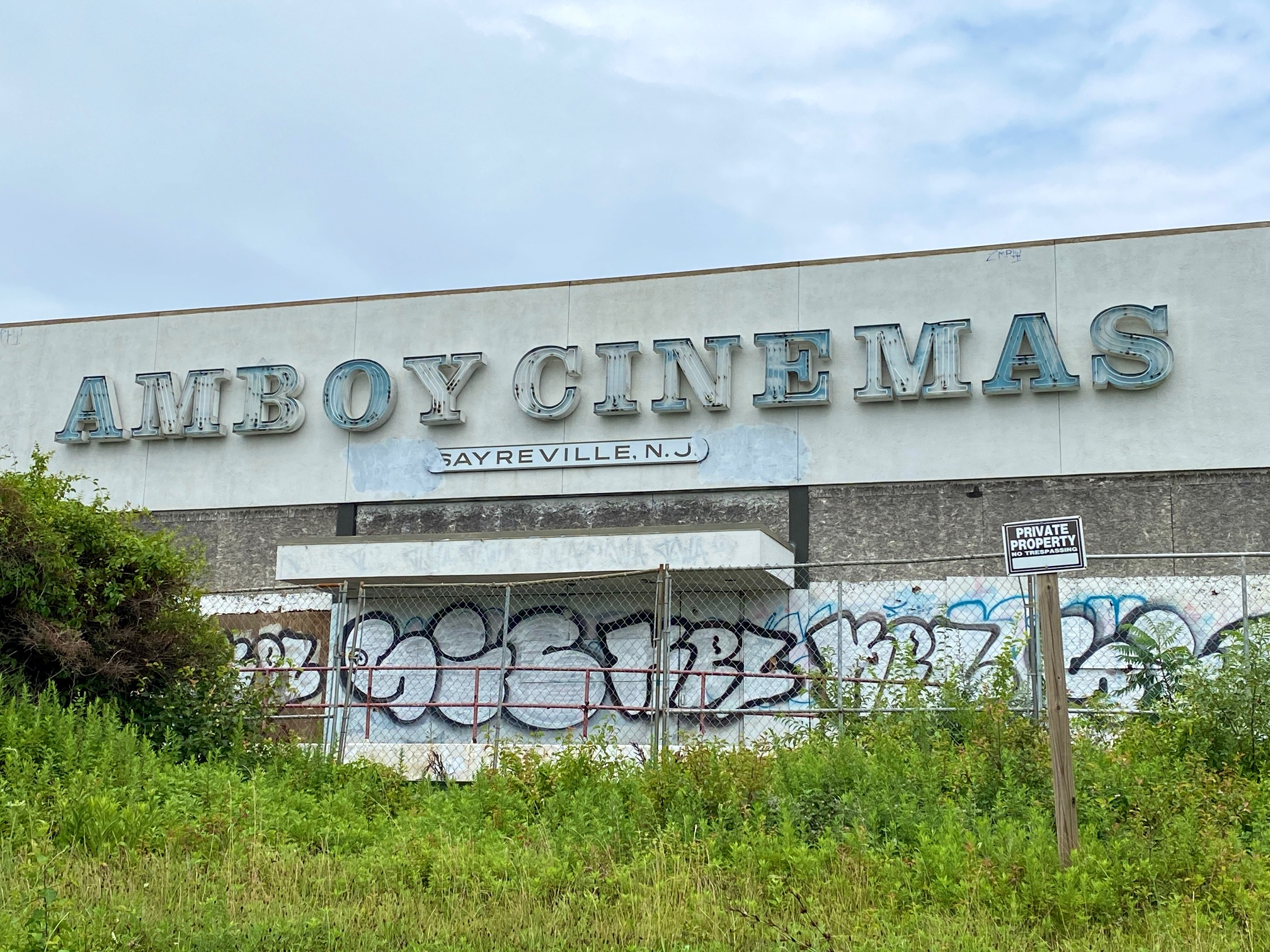
Amboy Cinemas, Sayreville, NJ July 2023

Although the borough remains an industrial community, the addition of many technology companies and a growing residential population has changed the landscape of this central New Jersey town.

Himanshu Shah, Executive Director of the Sayreville Economic and Redevelopment Agency, is heading up the development of the parcel of land commonly referred to as the National Lead Site. The new project is known as Riverton. This new $2.5 billion, mixed-use redevelopment project will be anchored by a Bass Pro Shop, expected to open by fall 2026. It is considered to be one of the largest and most significant redevelopment projects of a brownfield in the history of New Jersey.

The master plan of the area was finalized in 2012, with plans to create a mixed-use development which includes a shopping center, luxury mall, apartments, town homes, offices, and multiple marinas. Phase 1 of the plan has begun construction as of 2013. Plans include a luxury mall with 1,200,000 square feet (110,000 m^{2}) of space, 620,000 square feet (58,000 m^{2}) of luxury shopping, entertainment, restaurants and groceries, a 200,000 square feet (19,000 m^{2}) Bass Pro Shops, a 700,000 square feet (65,000 m^{2}) regional power center, 1,400 apartments and 600 homes, along with waterfront dining, hotels and office space.

=== Flood plain ===
Following extensive flooding near the river during Hurricane Sandy in 2012, many residents accepted an offer funded by the federal government in 2013 to buy out 250 houses in the floodplain.

== Transportation ==
=== Roads and highways ===
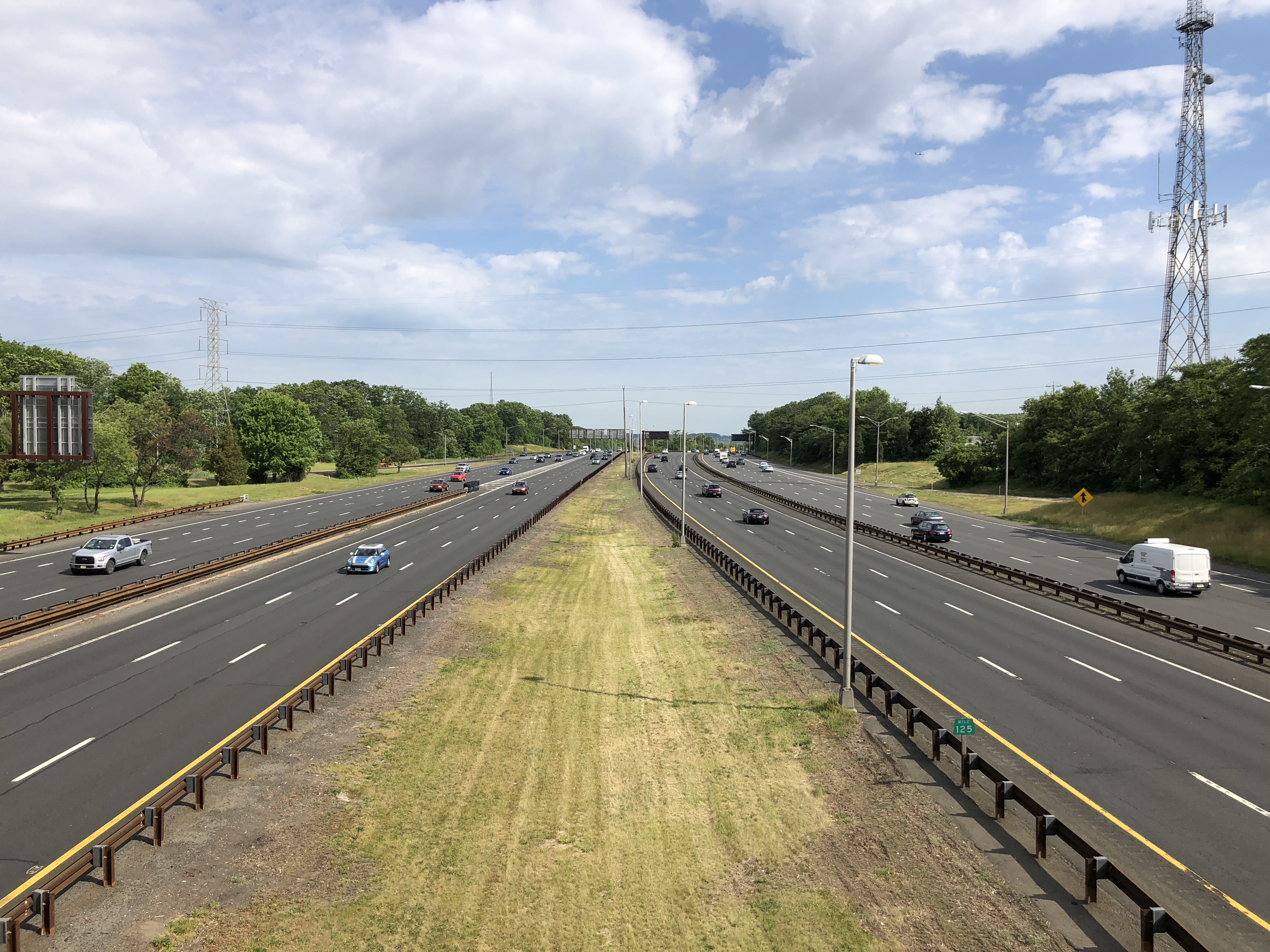
View north along the Garden State Parkway in Sayreville

As of May 2010, the borough had a total of 130.58 miles (210.15 km) of roadways, of which 101.75 miles (163.75 km) were maintained by the municipality, 17.93 miles (28.86 km) by Middlesex County, 6.17 miles (9.93 km) by the New Jersey Department of Transportation and 4.73 miles (7.61 km) by the New Jersey Turnpike Authority.

Several major roads and highways pass through the borough.

The Garden State Parkway is the most prominent highway serving Sayreville. U.S. Route 9 and Route 35 also pass through. While they don't pass directly through Sayreville, the New Jersey Turnpike (Interstate 95), Interstate 287, Route 440, U.S. Route 1, Route 18, Route 34 and Route 36 are all nearby and easily accessible.

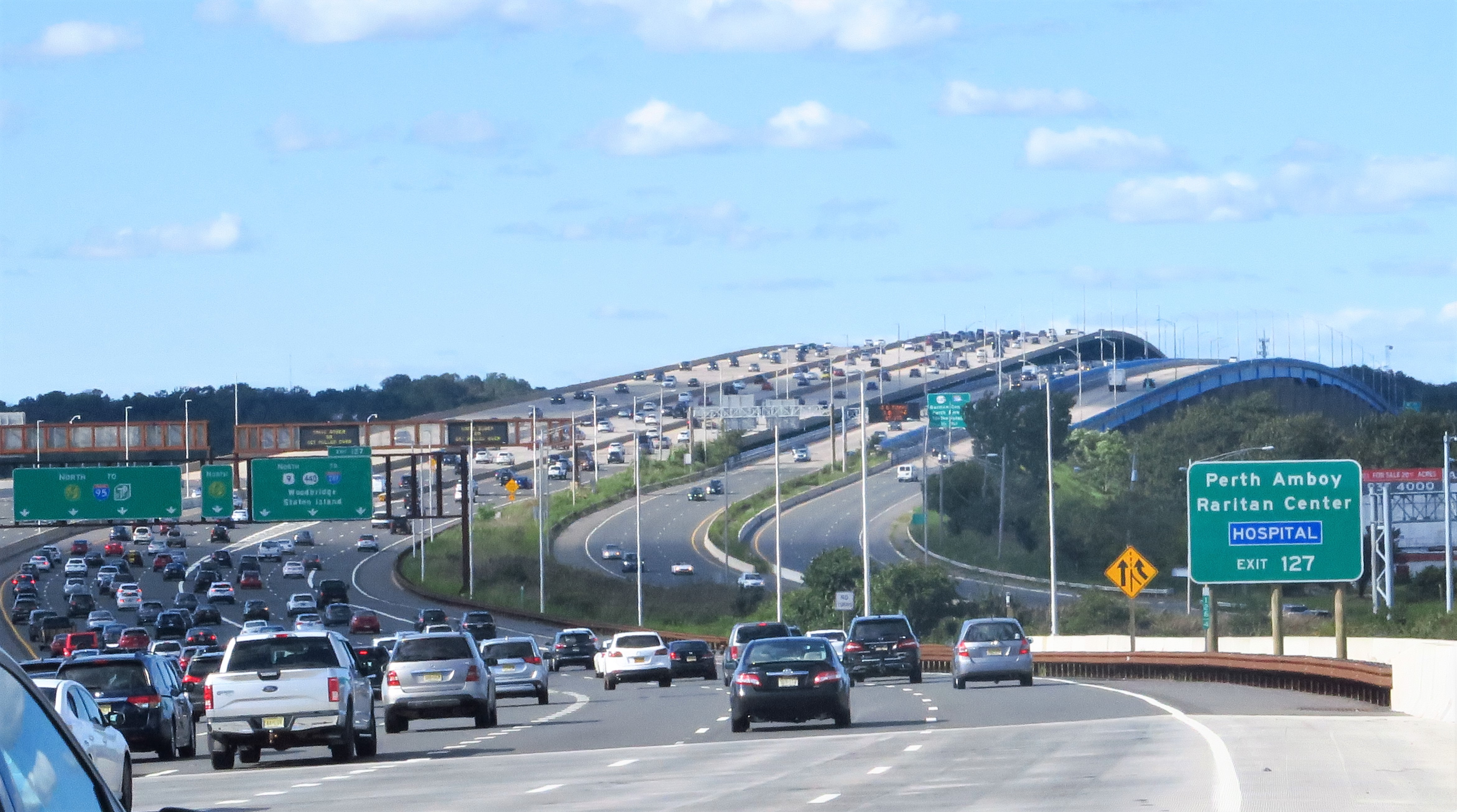
The Driscoll Bridge on the Garden State Parkway, crosses the Raritan River connecting Sayreville to Woodbridge Township; with a total of 15 travel lanes and six shoulder lanes, is one of the world's widest and busiest motor vehicle bridges

Three highway bridges span the Raritan River from Sayreville. The Edison Bridge on U.S. Route 9 connects Woodbridge Township on the north with Sayreville on the south; originally constructed in 1940 as a single span with four lanes, the bridge was replaced in 2003 with a six-lane structure that was constructed at a cost of $48 million. The Driscoll Bridge on the Garden State Parkway also connects Woodbridge Township on the north with Sayreville on the south; while the original bridge was completed and opened in July 1954, a project completed in 2009 provides a total of 15 lanes on two spans, earning it a description as the "world's widest highway bridge". The Victory Bridge carries Route 35, connecting Sayreville with Perth Amboy; from the time of its construction in 1926 until the Edison Bridge was completed in 1939, all traffic heading across the Raritan River was funneled through the Victory Bridge, whose original single-span swing bridge was replaced under a project completed in 2005 that provides two spans of traffic, including a 134-metre (440 ft) main span that was the longest precast cantilever segmental construction in the United States at the time of its construction.

=== Public transportation ===
NJ Transit offers service between the borough and the Port Authority Bus Terminal in Midtown Manhattan via the 131 and 139 bus routes. Service within New Jersey is offered to Newark on the 67, to Jersey City on the 64, and to other local destinations on the 815 and 817 routes.

Academy Bus provides additional weekday rush-hour service for commuters to Manhattan.

The Raritan River Railroad provided passenger service to Sayreville's Parlin Station from 1888 through 1938. The railroad is now defunct along this part of the line. Proposals have been made to use the line as a light rail route.

Old Bridge Airport in Old Bridge Township offers short-distance flights to surrounding areas. The closest major airports are Newark Liberty International Airport in Newark / Elizabeth, via the New Jersey Turnpike, which is roughly 21 miles (34 km) (about 32 minutes drive) from the center of Sayreville, and John F. Kennedy International Airport in Queens, traveling via the Belt Parkway after crossing through Staten Island, which is roughly 33 miles (53 km) away.

== Community ==
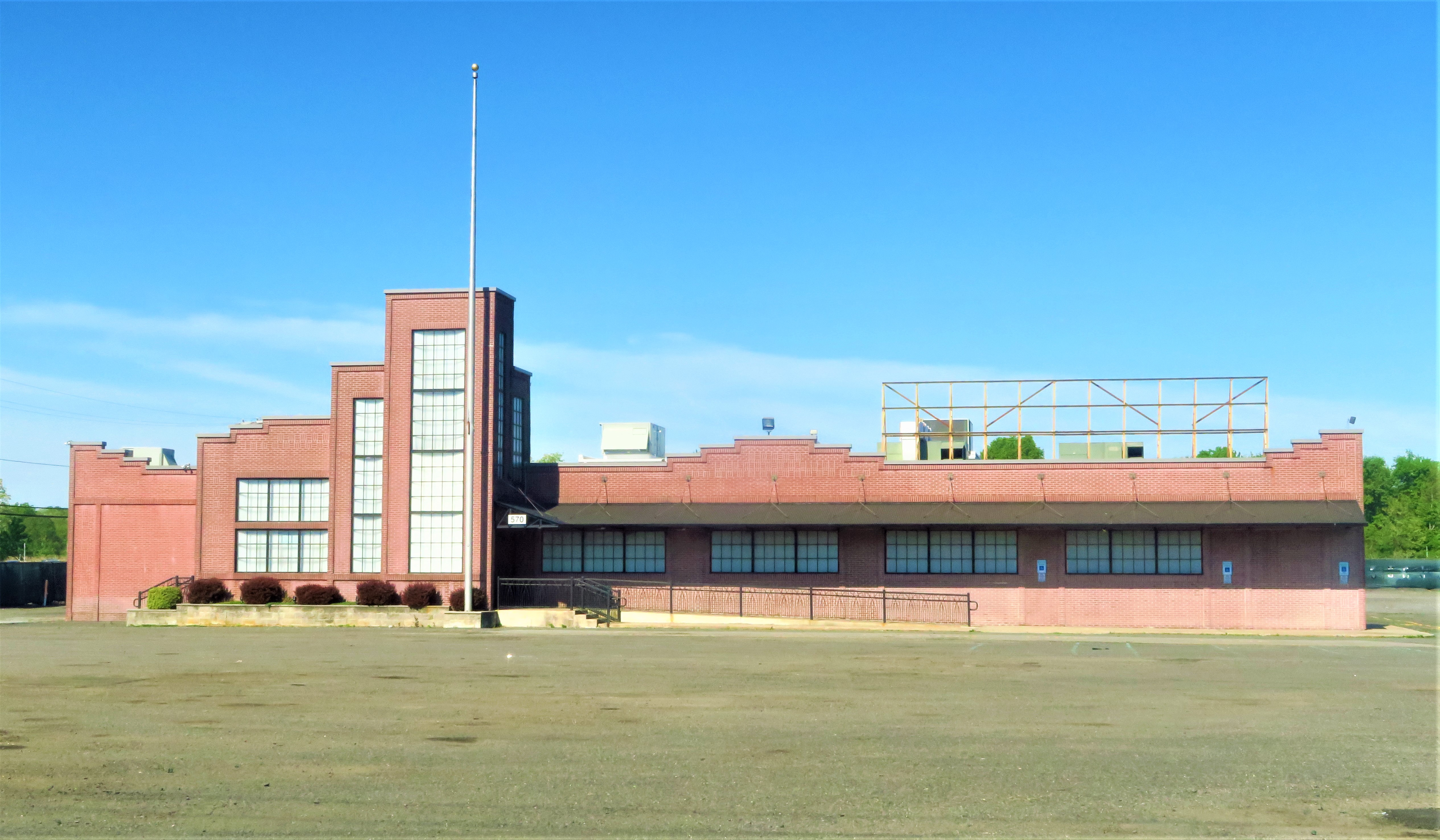
The Starland Ballroom

Sayreville is home to the Starland Ballroom concert venue, which opened in December 2003.

The community is home to the EPIC Church International, a non-denominational "megachurch" founded in 1980 that has a weekly attendance over 10,000, which was ranked 44th by Outreach magazine on its 2013 list of the "100 Largest Churches in America", and is the largest church in New Jersey.

Sayreville has many community recreational facilities, home to many sports such as soccer, football, and basketball.

Sayreville has a skate park, located in Kennedy Park, for skaters and bikers all around New Jersey.

== Notable people ==
People who were born in, residents of, or otherwise closely associated with Sayreville include:

- Barry T. Albin (born 1952), Justice of the New Jersey Supreme Court
- Brandon Bielak (born 1996), pitcher for the Houston Astros of Major League Baseball
- Jon Bon Jovi (born 1962), lead singer of the rock band Bon Jovi
- Randy Corman (born 1960), Sayreville councilmember who served in the New Jersey Senate
- Patrick Crosby (born 1985), professional indoor lacrosse goaltender
- Bob Dustal (born 1935), former pitcher for the Detroit Tigers
- Greg Evigan (born 1953), actor who appeared in B.J. and the Bear and My Two Dads
- Kene Eze (born 1992), soccer player who has played as a forward for National Premier Leagues Victoria 2 club North Geelong Warriors FC
- Jehyve Floyd (born 1997), basketball player in the Israeli Basketball Premier League
- Marilyn Ghigliotti (born 1961), actress who played the character Veronica Loughran in Kevin Smith's cult hit Clerks
- Myles Hartsfield (born 1997), American football safety and running back for the Carolina Panthers of the National Football League
- Dulé Hill (born 1975), actor who has appeared in The West Wing and Psych
- Tom Kelly (born 1950), former manager of the Minnesota Twins
- Kevin Mulvey (born 1985), former MLB pitcher who played for the Minnesota Twins and Arizona Diamondbacks
- Fabian Nicieza (born 1961), comic book writer and editor of Marvel titles X-Men, X-Force, New Warriors, Cable & Deadpool and Thunderbolts
- Eddie Popowski (1913–2001), coach and two-time interim manager of the Boston Red Sox
- Lea Bayers Rapp (born 1946), writer of non-fiction and children's fiction
- Rhonda Rompola (born 1960), coach of the Southern Methodist University women's basketball team from 1991 to 2016.
- Dave Sabo (born 1964), rock guitarist who plays in the heavy metal band Skid Row
- Mohamed Sanu (born 1989), wide receiver for the Atlanta Falcons
- John Wisniewski (born 1962), politician who served in the New Jersey General Assembly from 1996 to 2018
- Victor J. Wolski (born 1962), federal judge
