= Dunellen, New Jersey =

Borough in Middlesex County, New Jersey, US

- Borough
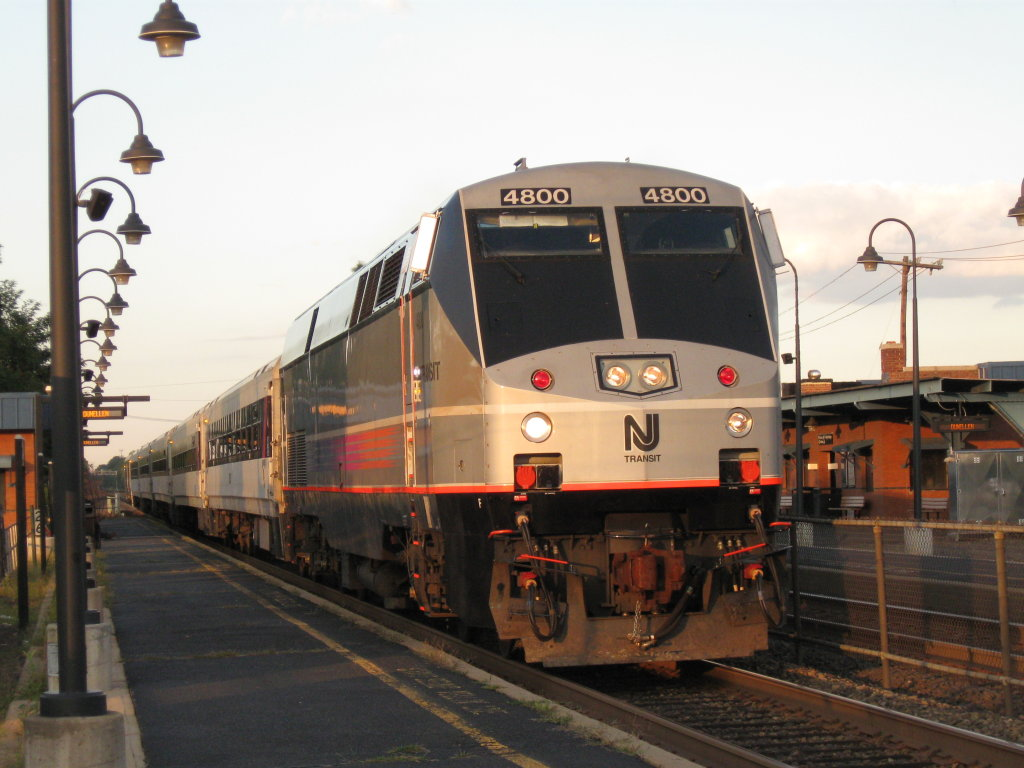
- Dunellen NJ Transit station

- Seal
- Nickname: "The Railroad Town"
- Motto: "Small Enough to Know You, Large Enough to Serve You."
- Location of Dunellen in Middlesex County highlighted in red (left). Inset map: Location of Middlesex County in New Jersey highlighted in orange (right).

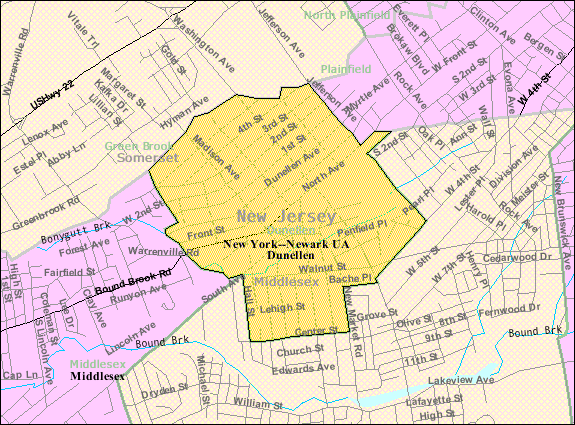
- Census Bureau map of Dunellen, New Jersey

- Location in Middlesex County Location in New Jersey Location in the United States
- Coordinates: 40.590294°N 74.465652°W
- Country: United States
- State: New Jersey
- County: Middlesex
- Incorporated: October 28, 1887
- Named after: Dunellen station

Government
  - Type: Borough
  - Body: Borough Council
  - Mayor: Jason F. Cilento (R, term ends December 31, 2027)
  - Administrator: Alex Miller
  - Municipal clerk: Lauren Staats

Area
  - Total: 1.06 sq mi (2.75 km^{2})
  - Land: 1.06 sq mi (2.75 km^{2})
  - Water: 0 sq mi (0.00 km^{2}) 0.00%
  - Rank: 495th of 565 in state 23rd of 25 in county
- Elevation: 52 ft (16 m)

Population (2020)
  - Total: 7,637
  - Estimate (2024): 8,411
  - Rank: 305th of 565 in state 21st of 25 in county
  - Density: 7,191.1/sq mi (2,776.5/km^{2})
  - Rank: 65th of 565 in state 4th of 25 in county
- Time zone: UTC−05:00 (Eastern (EST))
  - Summer (DST): UTC−04:00 (Eastern (EDT))
- ZIP Code: 08812
- Area codes: 732 and 908
- FIPS code: 3402318490
- GNIS feature ID: 0885198
- Website: www.dunellen-nj.gov

Dunellen (/dʌ.nɛl.ən/) is a borough in Middlesex County, in the U.S. state of New Jersey. It is located within the Raritan Valley region of central New Jersey. As of the 2020 United States census, the borough's population was 7,637, an increase of 410 (+5.7%) from the 2010 census count of 7,227, which in turn had reflected an increase of 404 (+5.9%) from the 6,823 counted at the 2000 census.

Dunellen was formed as a borough by an act of the New Jersey Legislature on October 28, 1887, when it broke away from Piscataway Township, based on the results of a referendum held on March 23, 1886. Dunellen's incorporation was confirmed on April 15, 1914. The borough was named for the Dunellen station of the Central Railroad of New Jersey.

== History ==
The earliest inhabitants of the area that would become Dunellen were the Lenape Native Americans; several Lenape sites in Dunellen were identified as part of a comprehensive survey in 1915. European settlers were drawn to the area as early as 1682, attracted by the productive agricultural land.

Railroad access from New York City to present-day Dunellen began in 1840. Dunellen grew from its start in 1867 with the construction of a railroad station, which was originally called New Market station, serving the nearby community of the same name in Piscataway. When it was originally constructed, the tracks were at grade level with North Avenue and the railroad was the Elizabethtown and Somerville Railroad, which later became part of the Central Railroad of New Jersey. The Central Railroad of New Jersey created the residential development in the area which it owned surrounding its train station. The railroad brought industry to the area.

The Art Color factory built in 1925 was Dunellen's principal industry and produced as many as 10 million magazines a month. The W. F. Hall Printing Company of Chicago bought Art Color in 1931, and ran it until 1968, when it closed the plant there.

== Geography ==
According to the United States Census Bureau, the borough had a total area of 1.06 square miles (2.75 km^{2}), all of which was land. Dunellen is in the Raritan Valley, a line of communities in central New Jersey. Dunellen is in the central division along with Bound Brook, South Bound Brook and Middlesex.

The borough borders Middlesex and Piscataway Township in Middlesex County; Green Brook Township in Somerset County; and Plainfield in Union County.

== Demographics ==
Historical population
Census	Pop.	Note	%±
1880	817		—
1890	1,060		29.7%
1900	1,239		16.9%
1910	1,990		60.6%
1920	3,394		70.6%
1930	5,148		51.7%
1940	5,360		4.1%
1950	6,291		17.4%
1960	6,840		8.7%
1970	7,072		3.4%
1980	6,593		−6.8%
1990	6,528		−1.0%
2000	6,823		4.5%
2010	7,227		5.9%
2020	7,637		5.7%
2025 (est.)	8,411	▲	10.1%
Population sources: 1880–1920 1880–1890; 1890–1910 1910–1930; 1940–2000 2000; 2010 2020

=== 2020 census ===
As of the 2020 census, Dunellen had a population of 7,637. The median age was 37.3 years. 24.0% of residents were under the age of 18 and 11.9% of residents were 65 years of age or older. For every 100 females there were 103.1 males, and for every 100 females age 18 and over there were 101.5 males age 18 and over.

100.0% of residents lived in urban areas, while 0.0% lived in rural areas.

There were 2,620 households in Dunellen, of which 37.3% had children under the age of 18 living in them. Of all households, 50.7% were married-couple households, 20.4% were households with a male householder and no spouse or partner present, and 22.7% were households with a female householder and no spouse or partner present. About 22.4% of all households were made up of individuals and 8.0% had someone living alone who was 65 years of age or older.

There were 2,727 housing units, of which 3.9% were vacant. The homeowner vacancy rate was 1.0% and the rental vacancy rate was 3.9%.

Racial composition as of the 2020 census
Race	Number	Percent
White	3,761	49.2%
Black or African American	713	9.3%
American Indian and Alaska Native	39	0.5%
Asian	435	5.7%
Native Hawaiian and Other Pacific Islander	4	0.1%
Some other race	1,674	21.9%
Two or more races	1,011	13.2%
Hispanic or Latino (of any race)	2,820	36.9%

=== 2010 census ===
The 2010 United States census counted 7,227 people, 2,566 households, and 1,763 families in the borough. The population density was 6,894.8 per square mile (2,662.1/km^{2}). There were 2,683 housing units at an average density of 2,559.7 per square mile (988.3/km^{2}). The racial makeup was 73.46% (5,309) White, 8.62% (623) Black or African American, 0.26% (19) Native American, 4.51% (326) Asian, 0.06% (4) Pacific Islander, 9.67% (699) from other races, and 3.42% (247) from two or more races. Hispanic or Latino of any race were 26.75% (1,933) of the population.

Of the 2,566 households, 33.0% had children under the age of 18; 49.4% were married couples living together; 13.3% had a female householder with no husband present and 31.3% were non-families. Of all households, 24.9% were made up of individuals and 7.1% had someone living alone who was 65 years of age or older. The average household size was 2.81 and the average family size was 3.36.

23.7% of the population were under the age of 18, 8.8% from 18 to 24, 30.9% from 25 to 44, 26.8% from 45 to 64, and 9.7% who were 65 years of age or older. The median age was 37.1 years. For every 100 females, the population had 101.3 males. For every 100 females ages 18 and older there were 100.4 males.

The Census Bureau's 2006–2010 American Community Survey showed that (in 2010 inflation-adjusted dollars) median household income was $74,375 (with a margin of error of +/− $13,504) and the median family income was $88,527 (+/− $13,868). Males had a median income of $48,542 (+/− $13,495) versus $43,920 (+/− $12,613) for females. The per capita income for the borough was $30,960 (+/− $3,015). About 5.6% of families and 8.3% of the population were below the poverty line, including 7.8% of those under age 18 and 9.5% of those age 65 or over.

=== 2000 census ===
As of the 2000 United States census there were 6,823 people, 2,451 households, and 1,710 families residing in the borough. The population density was 6,573.9 inhabitants per square mile (2,538.2/km^{2}). There were 2,520 housing units at an average density of 2,428.0 per square mile (937.5/km^{2}). The racial makeup of the borough was 84.07% White, 3.66% African American, 0.25% Native American, 3.56% Asian, 0.01% Pacific Islander, 6.38% from other races, and 2.07% from two or more races. Hispanic or Latino of any race were 14.80% of the population.

There were 2,451 households, out of which 33.9% had children under the age of 18 living with them, 54.4% were married couples living together, 10.7% had a female householder with no husband present, and 30.2% were non-families. 23.5% of all households were made up of individuals, and 8.2% had someone living alone who was 65 years of age or older. The average household size was 2.75 and the average family size was 3.30.

In the borough the population was spread out, with 24.9% under the age of 18, 6.9% from 18 to 24, 36.0% from 25 to 44, 20.9% from 45 to 64, and 11.3% who were 65 years of age or older. The median age was 36 years. For every 100 females, there were 101.0 males. For every 100 females age 18 and over, there were 99.2 males.

The median income for a household in the borough was $59,205, and the median income for a family was $67,188. Males had a median income of $45,000 versus $34,130 for females. The per capita income for the borough was $26,529. About 1.4% of families and 3.3% of the population were below the poverty line, including 2.0% of those under age 18 and 4.2% of those age 65 or over.

== Government ==
=== Local government ===
Dunellen is governed under the borough form of New Jersey municipal government, which is used in 218 municipalities (of the 564) statewide, making it the most common form of government in New Jersey. The governing body is composed of the mayor and the borough council, with all positions elected at-large on a partisan basis as part of the November general election. A mayor is elected directly by the voters to a four-year term of office. The borough council includes six members elected to serve three-year terms on a staggered basis, with two seats coming up for election each year in a three-year cycle. The borough form of government used by Dunellen is a "weak mayor / strong council" government in which council members act as the legislative body with the mayor presiding at meetings and voting only in the event of a tie. The mayor can veto ordinances subject to an override by a two-thirds majority vote of the council. The mayor makes committee and liaison assignments for council members, and most appointments are made by the mayor with the advice and consent of the council.

As of 2026, the mayor of Dunellen is Republican Jason F. Cilento, whose term of office ends December 31, 2027. Members of the borough council (with party and term-end year in parentheses) are Council President Crisol-Iris Lantz (R, 2026), Teresa Albertson (R, 2027), Trina G. Rios (R, 2028), William R. Scott (R, 2027), Daniel Cole Sigmon (R, 2028) and Harold VanDermark (R, 2026).

In October 2021, the borough council selected Harold VanDermark from a list of three candidates nominated by the Democratic Municipal Committee to fill the seat expiring in December 2023 that had been held by Tremayne Reid until he resigned earlier that month. VanDermark will serve on an interim basis until the November 2021 general election, when voters will choose a candidate to serve the balance of the term of office.

=== Federal, state and county representation ===
Dunellen is located in the 12th Congressional District and is part of New Jersey's 21st state legislative district.

For the 119th United States Congress, New Jersey's 12th congressional district is represented by Bonnie Watson Coleman (D, Ewing Township). New Jersey is represented in the United States Senate by Democrats Cory Booker (Newark, term ends 2027) and Andy Kim (Moorestown, term ends 2031).

For the 2026–2027 session, the 21st legislative district of the New Jersey Legislature is represented in the State Senate by Jon Bramnick (R, Westfield) and in the General Assembly by Vincent Kearney (D, Garwood) and Andrew Macurdy (D, Summit).

Middlesex County is governed by a Board of County Commissioners, whose seven members are elected at-large on a partisan basis to serve three-year terms of office on a staggered basis, with either two or three seats coming up for election each year as part of the November general election. At an annual reorganization meeting held in January, the board selects from among its members a commissioner director and deputy director. As of 2025, Middlesex County's Commissioners (with party affiliation, term-end year, and residence listed in parentheses) are:

Director Ronald G. Rios (D, Carteret, 2027), Deputy Director Shanti Narra (D, North Brunswick, 2027), Claribel A. "Clary" Azcona-Barber (D, New Brunswick, 2025), Charles Kenny (D, Woodbridge Township, 2025), Leslie Koppel (D, Monroe Township, 2026), Chanelle Scott McCullum (D, Piscataway, 2025) and Charles E. Tomaro (D, Edison, 2026).

Constitutional officers are: Clerk Nancy Pinkin (D, 2025, East Brunswick), Sheriff Mildred S. Scott (D, 2025, Piscataway) and Surrogate Claribel Cortes (D, 2026; North Brunswick).

=== Politics ===
As of March 2011, there were a total of 3,775 registered voters in Dunellen, of which 1,063 (28.2%) were registered as Democrats, 726 (19.2%) were registered as Republicans and 1,983 (52.5%) were registered as Unaffiliated. There were 3 voters registered as Libertarians or Greens.

United States presidential election results for Dunellen
Year	Republican		Democratic		Third party(ies)	
Year	No.	%	No.	%	No.	%
2024	1,409	43.72%	1,733	53.77%	81	2.51%
2020	1,256	38.45%	1,953	59.78%	58	1.78%
2016	1,170	41.94%	1,472	52.76%	148	5.30%
2012	1,047	42.34%	1,387	56.09%	39	1.58%
2008	1,244	44.88%	1,478	53.32%	50	1.80%
2004	1,260	50.10%	1,211	48.15%	44	1.75%
2000	1,049	44.43%	1,177	49.85%	135	5.72%

In the 2012 presidential election, Democrat Barack Obama received 56.1% of the vote (1,387 cast), ahead of Republican Mitt Romney with 42.3% (1,047 votes), and other candidates with 1.6% (39 votes), among the 2,488 ballots cast by the borough's 3,842 registered voters (15 ballots were spoiled), for a turnout of 64.8%. In the 2008 presidential election, Democrat Barack Obama received 52.9% of the vote (1,478 cast), ahead of Republican John McCain with 44.5% (1,244 votes) and other candidates with 1.8% (50 votes), among the 2,794 ballots cast by the borough's 3,883 registered voters, for a turnout of 72.0%. In the 2004 presidential election, Republican George W. Bush received 50.0% of the vote (1,260 ballots cast), outpolling Democrat John Kerry with 48.0% (1,211 votes) and other candidates with 1.2% (44 votes), among the 2,521 ballots cast by the borough's 3,666 registered voters, for a turnout percentage of 68.8.

Gubernatorial election results for Dunellen
Year	Republican		Democratic		Third party(ies)	
Year	No.	%	No.	%	No.	%
2025	900	36.51%	1,542	62.56%	23	0.93%
2021	833	48.01%	878	50.61%	24	1.38%
2017	774	48.65%	765	48.08%	52	3.27%
2013	982	64.73%	503	33.16%	32	2.11%
2009	944	54.92%	589	34.26%	186	10.82%
2005	744	48.25%	703	45.59%	95	6.16%

In the 2013 gubernatorial election, Republican Chris Christie received 64.7% of the vote (982 cast), ahead of Democrat Barbara Buono with 33.2% (503 votes), and other candidates with 2.1% (32 votes), among the 1,540 ballots cast by the borough's 3,894 registered voters (23 ballots were spoiled), for a turnout of 39.5%. In the 2009 gubernatorial election, Republican Chris Christie received 54.6% of the vote (944 ballots cast), ahead of Democrat Jon Corzine with 34.1% (589 votes), Independent Chris Daggett with 8.9% (153 votes) and other candidates with 1.9% (33 votes), among the 1,728 ballots cast by the borough's 3,744 registered voters, yielding a 46.2% turnout.

United States Senate election results for Dunellen1
Year	Republican		Democratic		Third party(ies)	
Year	No.	%	No.	%	No.	%
2024	1,283	42.23%	1,654	54.44%	101	3.32%
2018	1,001	42.91%	1,212	51.95%	120	5.14%
2012	928	40.37%	1,325	57.63%	46	2.00%
2006	708	48.59%	666	45.71%	83	5.70%

United States Senate election results for Dunellen2
Year	Republican		Democratic		Third party(ies)	
Year	No.	%	No.	%	No.	%
2020	1,196	37.38%	1,873	58.53%	131	4.09%
2014	592	50.47%	559	47.66%	22	1.88%
2013	498	54.79%	396	43.56%	15	1.65%
2008	1,155	45.67%	1,294	51.17%	80	3.16%

== Education ==
The Dunellen Public Schools serve students in pre-kindergarten through twelfth grade. As of the 2020–21 school year, the district, comprised of three schools, had an enrollment of 1,238 students and 112.0 classroom teachers (on an FTE basis), for a student–teacher ratio of 11.1:1. Schools in the district (with 2020–21 enrollment data from the National Center for Education Statistics) are John P. Faber School with 591 students in grades PreK-5, Lincoln Middle School with 246 students in grades 6-8 and Dunellen High School with 372 students in grades 9-12.

Eighth grade students from all of Middlesex County are eligible to apply to attend the high school programs offered by the Middlesex County Magnet Schools, a county-wide vocational school district that offers full-time career and technical education at its schools in East Brunswick, Edison, Perth Amboy, Piscataway and Woodbridge Township, with no tuition charged to students for attendance.

== Transportation ==
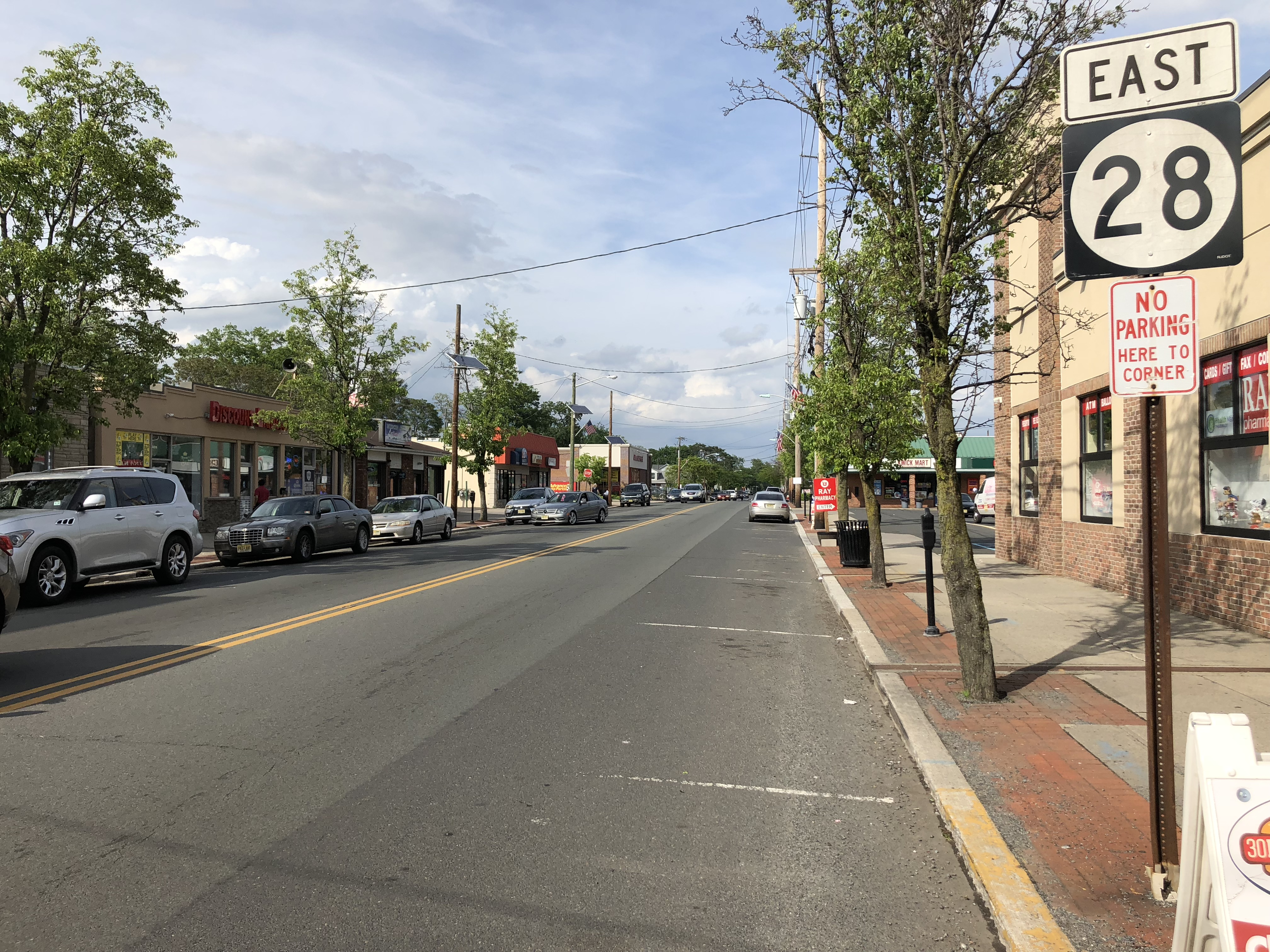
Route 28 in Dunellen

=== Roads and highways ===
As of May 2010, the borough had a total of 17.82 miles (28.68 km) of roadways, of which 14.29 miles (23.00 km) were maintained by the municipality, 2.48 miles (3.99 km) by Middlesex County and 1.05 miles (1.69 km) by the New Jersey Department of Transportation.

No Interstate or U.S. highways serve Dunellen directly. The most prominent roads passing through the borough include New Jersey Route 28 and County Route 529.

=== Public transportation ===
Commuter rail service is available at the Dunellen station. There is a ticket office open only during morning rush hour and a small waiting area at this stop. There are now automated ticket machines located next to the office. A simple station, there are two tracks with two small side platforms. The station is located on a high embankment. Service on the Raritan Valley Line, with most trains terminating at Newark Penn Station, where passengers are able to transfer to other NJ Transit service using a combined ticket or PATH and Amtrak to New York City. A limited number of weekday trains continue directly to New York Penn Station.

NJ Transit bus service is provided on the 113 and 114 routes to the Port Authority Bus Terminal in Midtown Manhattan, with local service on the 59, 65 and 66 routes.

Suburban Transit offers service between Dunellen and Atlantic City on its 700 route.

== Organizations ==
- Juggling Life is a non-profit organization whose purpose is to inspire and emotionally heal ill and/or disadvantaged children through juggling and the arts.

== Notable people ==
People who were born in, residents of, or otherwise closely associated with Dunellen include:

- Tom Brislin (born 1973), keyboardist/songwriter/vocalist for the band Kansas since 2018
- Horace Butterworth (1868–1939), sports coach, college athletics administrator and educator
- Bob Fitzsimmons (1863–1917), boxer who was the sport's first three-division world champion
- Bob Maier (1915–1993), third baseman who played for the Detroit Tigers team that won the 1945 World Series in his only season in the Major Leagues
- Sydney McLaughlin-Levrone (born 1999), hurdler and sprinter who won the Gold Medal in the 400-meter hurdles at the 2020 and 2024 Summer Olympics
- Judith Persichilli (born 1949), nurse and health care executive who has served as the commissioner of the New Jersey Department of Health
- William Marsh Rice (1816–1900), businessman who bequeathed his fortune to found Rice University
- Tom Scharpling (born 1969), author, screenwriter, broadcaster, and media executive; creator and host of The Best Show
- Walter Stone (1920–1999), writer for The Honeymooners and The Jackie Gleason Show
- Frank Umont (1917–1991), Major League Baseball umpire

== Twin towns—Sister cities ==
Dunellen is twinned with:

- Borgonovo Val Tidone, Italy
- Castel San Giovanni, Italy
