= Middlesex, New Jersey =

Borough in Middlesex County, New Jersey, US

- Borough
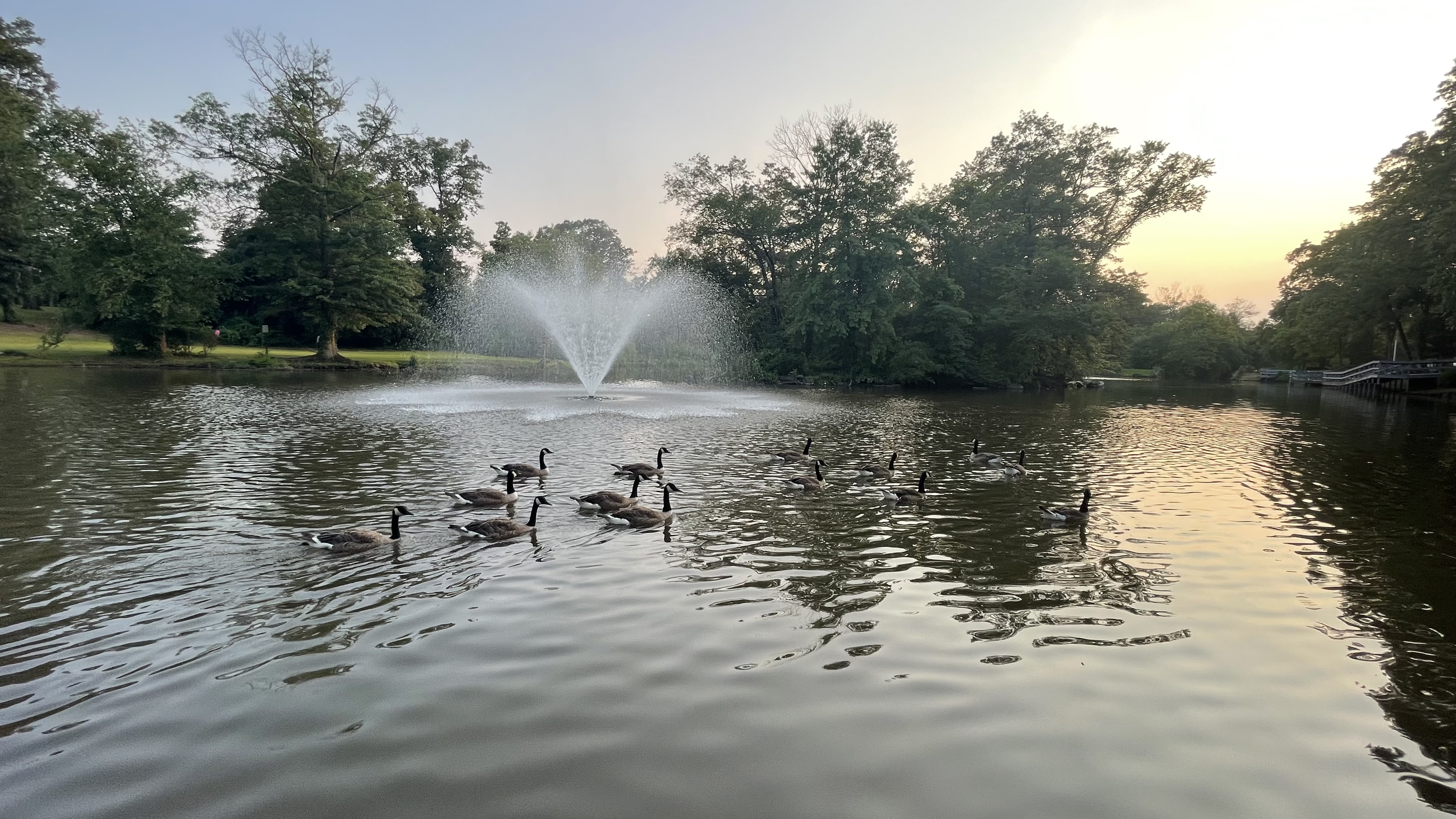
- Victor Crowell Park, featuring the duck pond

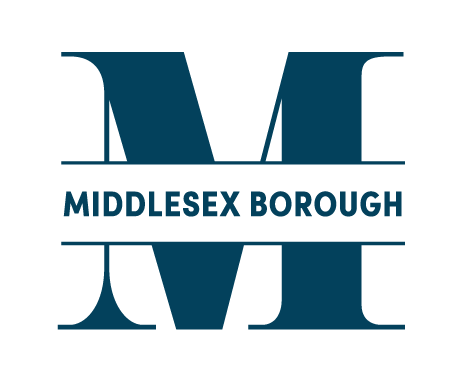
- logo

- Location of Middlesex in Middlesex County highlighted in red (left). Inset map: Location of Middlesex County in New Jersey highlighted in orange (right).

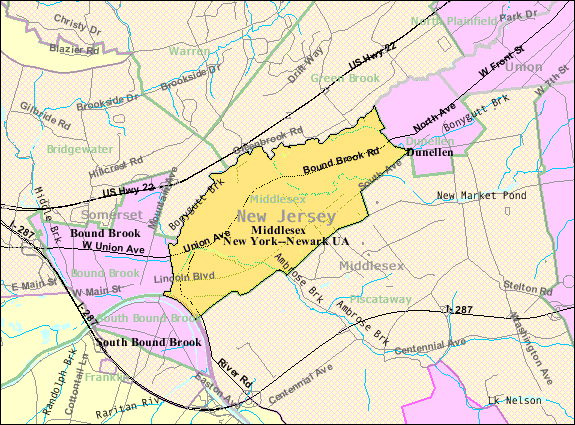
- Census Bureau map of Middlesex, New Jersey

- Location in Middlesex County Location in New Jersey Location in the United States
- Coordinates: 40.574627°N 74.498259°W
- Country: United States
- State: New Jersey
- County: Middlesex
- Incorporated: April 9, 1913
- Named for: Middlesex, England

Government
  - Type: Borough
  - Body: Borough Council
  - Mayor: Jack Mikolajczyk (R, term ends December 31, 2027)
  - Administrator: Matthew Geist (interim)
  - Municipal clerk: Kelsey Meixner

Area
  - Total: 3.51 sq mi (9.09 km^{2})
  - Land: 3.49 sq mi (9.03 km^{2})
  - Water: 0.023 sq mi (0.06 km^{2}) 0.63%
  - Rank: 315th of 565 in state 16th of 25 in county
- Elevation: 39 ft (12 m)

Population (2020)
  - Total: 14,636
  - Estimate (2023): 14,461
  - Rank: 181st of 565 in state 18th of 25 in county
  - Density: 4,196.1/sq mi (1,620.1/km^{2})
  - Rank: 147th of 565 in state 12th of 25 in county
- Time zone: UTC−05:00 (Eastern (EST))
  - Summer (DST): UTC−04:00 (Eastern (EDT))
- ZIP Code: 08846
- Area code: 732
- FIPS code: 3402345900
- GNIS feature ID: 0885299
- Website: www.middlesexboro-nj.gov

Middlesex is a borough in Middlesex County, in the U.S. state of New Jersey. It is located within the Raritan Valley region. As of the 2020 United States census, the borough's population was 14,636, its highest decennial count and an increase of 1,001 (+7.3%) from the 2010 census count of 13,635, which in turn reflected a decline of 82 (−0.6%) from the 13,717 counted in the 2000 census.

Middlesex was incorporated as a borough by an act of the New Jersey Legislature on April 9, 1913, from portions of Piscataway, based on the results of a referendum held on May 6, 1913. The borough was named after Middlesex, England.

== History ==
The Harris Lane School was a one-room schoolhouse that was the oldest school in Middlesex County, dating back to its construction in the 1790s. The original Pierce School was known as the East Bound Brook School House and The Parker House was also used for education until it was converted into a two-family house. As the Borough grew new schools were constructed to accommodate many more students. Our Lady of Mt. Virgin School was the first parochial school built in 1954.

In 1905, the Lincoln section of Middlesex organized a volunteer fire company and that set the organization of four other fire companies in the borough.

Middlesex was a portion of Piscataway Township, until May 6, 1913, when it was incorporated as a separate entity through the action of the state legislature and local referendum. George Harris was elected as the first mayor and the first borough council was elected at the same time. Two constables were the law enforcement officers and were soon assisted by five appointed marshals.

== Geography ==
According to the United States Census Bureau, the borough had a total area of 3.51 square miles (9.09 km^{2}), including 3.49 square miles (9.03 km^{2}) of land and 0.02 square miles (0.06 km^{2}) of water (0.63%).

Unincorporated communities, localities and place names located partially or completely within the borough include East Bound Brook and Lincoln.

The borough borders the Middlesex County municipalities of Dunellen and Piscataway Township in Middlesex County; and Bound Brook, Bridgewater Township, Green Brook Township and South Bound Brook in Somerset County.

Middlesex is in the central division of the Raritan Valley (a line of cities in central New Jersey), along with Dunellen, Bound Brook, and South Bound Brook.

== Demographics ==
Historical population
Census	Pop.	Note	%±
1920	1,852		—
1930	3,504		89.2%
1940	3,763		7.4%
1950	5,943		57.9%
1960	10,520		77.0%
1970	15,038		42.9%
1980	13,480		−10.4%
1990	13,055		−3.2%
2000	13,717		5.1%
2010	13,635		−0.6%
2020	14,636		7.3%
2023 (est.)	14,461	▼	−1.2%
Population sources: 1920 1920–1930 1940–2000; 2000 2010 2020

=== 2020 census ===
As of the 2020 census, Middlesex had a population of 14,636. The median age was 40.2 years. 21.4% of residents were under the age of 18 and 15.3% of residents were 65 years of age or older. For every 100 females there were 92.7 males, and for every 100 females age 18 and over there were 92.9 males age 18 and over.

100.0% of residents lived in urban areas, while 0.0% lived in rural areas.

There were 5,302 households in Middlesex, of which 33.8% had children under the age of 18 living in them. Of all households, 53.6% were married-couple households, 15.2% were households with a male householder and no spouse or partner present, and 24.8% were households with a female householder and no spouse or partner present. About 21.6% of all households were made up of individuals and 10.8% had someone living alone who was 65 years of age or older.

There were 5,472 housing units, of which 3.1% were vacant. The homeowner vacancy rate was 0.8% and the rental vacancy rate was 3.1%.

Racial composition as of the 2020 census
Race	Number	Percent
White	8,841	60.4%
Black or African American	968	6.6%
American Indian and Alaska Native	77	0.5%
Asian	1,176	8.0%
Native Hawaiian and Other Pacific Islander	5	0.0%
Some other race	1,826	12.5%
Two or more races	1,743	11.9%
Hispanic or Latino (of any race)	3,751	25.6%

=== 2010 census ===
The 2010 United States census counted 13,635 people, 4,984 households, and 3,633 families in the borough. The population density was 3,876.2 per square mile (1,496.6/km^{2}). There were 5,148 housing units at an average density of 1,463.5 per square mile (565.1/km^{2}). The racial makeup was 81.24% (11,077) White, 5.13% (699) Black or African American, 0.18% (24) Native American, 6.00% (818) Asian, 0.07% (10) Pacific Islander, 5.37% (732) from other races, and 2.02% (275) from two or more races. Hispanic or Latino of any race were 16.47% (2,246) of the population.

Of the 4,984 households, 32.0% had children under the age of 18; 56.0% were married couples living together; 11.8% had a female householder with no husband present and 27.1% were non-families. Of all households, 22.2% were made up of individuals and 10.8% had someone living alone who was 65 years of age or older. The average household size was 2.73 and the average family size was 3.22.

22.5% of the population were under the age of 18, 8.1% from 18 to 24, 26.1% from 25 to 44, 29.5% from 45 to 64, and 13.8% who were 65 years of age or older. The median age was 40.7 years. For every 100 females, the population had 93.9 males. For every 100 females ages 18 and older there were 91.8 males.

The Census Bureau's 2006–2010 American Community Survey showed that (in 2010 inflation-adjusted dollars) median household income was $80,338 (with a margin of error of +/− $7,790) and the median family income was $93,817 (+/− $13,746). Males had a median income of $55,248 (+/− $7,439) versus $46,447 (+/− $5,086) for females. The per capita income for the borough was $34,607 (+/− $3,321). About 0.6% of families and 2.1% of the population were below the poverty line, including 1.6% of those under age 18 and 4.6% of those age 65 or over.

=== 2000 census ===
As of the 2000 United States census there were 13,717 people, 5,048 households, and 3,740 families residing in the borough. The population density was 3,921.1 inhabitants per square mile (1,513.9/km^{2}). There were 5,130 housing units at an average density of 1,466.5 per square mile (566.2/km^{2}). The racial makeup of the borough was 87.26% White, 3.36% African American, 0.13% Native American, 4.16% Asian, 0.02% Pacific Islander, 3.21% from other races, and 1.86% from two or more races. Hispanic or Latino of any race were 9.00% of the population.

There were 5,048 households, out of which 34.1% had children under the age of 18 living with them, 59.3% were married couples living together, 10.5% had a female householder with no husband present, and 25.9% were non-families. 21.7% of all households were made up of individuals, and 10.7% had someone living alone who was 65 years of age or older. The average household size was 2.71 and the average family size was 3.17.

In the borough the population was spread out, with 24.1% under the age of 18, 6.2% from 18 to 24, 32.3% from 25 to 44, 23.2% from 45 to 64, and 14.2% who were 65 years of age or older. The median age was 38 years. For every 100 females, there were 95.0 males. For every 100 females age 18 and over, there were 91.9 males.

The median income for a household in the borough was $60,723, and the median income for a family was $70,343. Males had a median income of $47,446 versus $34,232 for females. The per capita income for the borough was $27,834. About 2.4% of families and 3.6% of the population were below the poverty line, including 4.1% of those under age 18 and 2.3% of those age 65 or over.

== Government ==
=== Local government ===
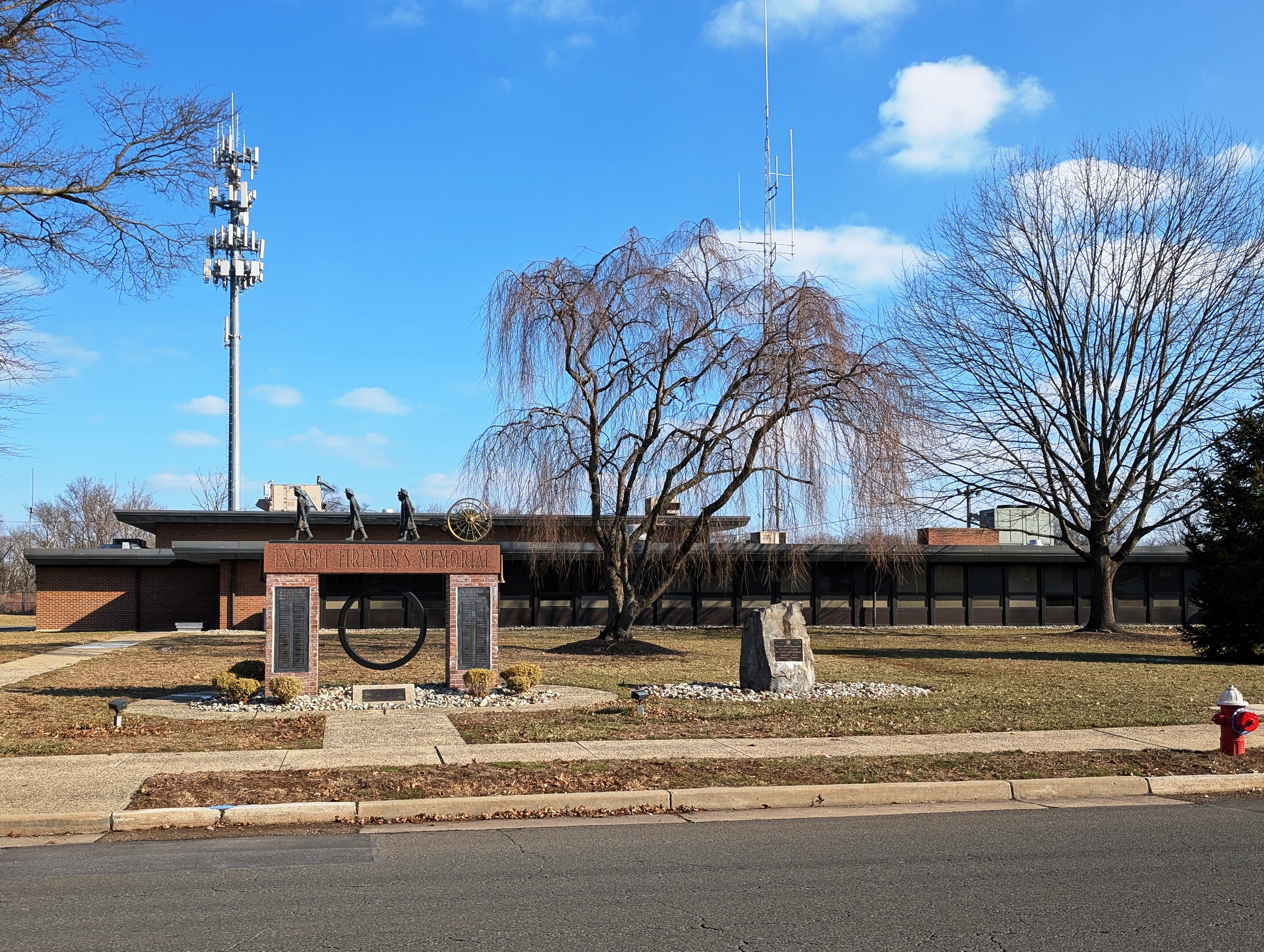
Middlesex Municipal Building and Firemen's Memorial

Middlesex is governed under the borough form of New Jersey municipal government, which is used in 218 municipalities (of the 564) statewide, making it the most common form of government in New Jersey. The governing body is comprised of a mayor and a borough council, with all positions elected at-large on a partisan basis as part of the November general election. A mayor is elected directly by the voters to a four-year term of office. The borough council includes six members elected to serve three-year terms on a staggered basis, with two seats coming up for election each year in a three-year cycle. The borough form of government used by Middlesex is a "weak mayor / strong council" government in which council members act as the legislative body with the mayor presiding at meetings and voting only in the event of a tie. The mayor can veto ordinances subject to an override by a two-thirds majority vote of the council. The mayor makes committee and liaison assignments for council members, and most appointments are made by the mayor with the advice and consent of the council.

The seven-member governing body is empowered to enact local ordinances, to levy municipal taxes and conduct the affairs of the community. In almost all cases, it can review and approve the actions of other Middlesex Borough committees and agencies. The mayor and Borough Council conduct all of their business during monthly meetings open to the public. All legislative powers of the borough are exercised by the mayor and council. These powers can take the form of a resolution, ordinance or proclamation.

As of 2026, the mayor of Middlesex is Republican John "Jack" Mikolajczyk, whose term of office ends December 31, 2027. Members of the Middlesex Borough Council are Council President Michael Conahan (R, 2026), Jennifer Clock (R, 2028), Joseph DeScenza (R, 2027), Kevin Dotey (R, 2026), Kenneth Griggs Jr. (R, 2027) and Shannon Quinn (R, 2028)).

In July 2022, the borough council appointed Michael Conahan to fill the seat expiring in December 2023 that had been held by Amy Flood. Conahan served on an interim basis until the November 2022 election when he was elected to serve the balance of the term.

In January 2020, the borough council appointed Amy Flood to fill the seat expiring in December 2020 that was vacated by John L. Madden when he took office as mayor.

Until his selection in early 2006 to serve as borough administrator, Ron Dobies had been one of the longest-tenured mayors in New Jersey, with 26 years of service to Middlesex. Dobies left his position as mayor in 2006 and took a position as the borough's administrator. After being fired in 2008, he was successful in his suit against the borough and was restored to his position. In 2011 he ran for mayor again and won a four-year term that ended in 2015.

=== Federal, state and county representation ===
Middlesex is located in the 12th Congressional District and is part of New Jersey's 21st state legislative district.

For the 119th United States Congress, New Jersey's 12th congressional district is represented by Bonnie Watson Coleman (D, Ewing Township). New Jersey is represented in the United States Senate by Democrats Cory Booker (Newark, term ends 2027) and Andy Kim (Moorestown, term ends 2031).

For the 2026–2027 session, the 21st legislative district of the New Jersey Legislature is represented in the State Senate by Jon Bramnick (R, Westfield) and in the General Assembly by Vincent Kearney (D, Garwood) and Andrew Macurdy (D, Summit).

Middlesex County is governed by a Board of County Commissioners, whose seven members are elected at-large on a partisan basis to serve three-year terms of office on a staggered basis, with either two or three seats coming up for election each year as part of the November general election. At an annual reorganization meeting held in January, the board selects from among its members a commissioner director and deputy director. As of 2025, Middlesex County's Commissioners (with party affiliation, term-end year, and residence listed in parentheses) are:

Director Ronald G. Rios (D, Carteret, 2027), Deputy Director Shanti Narra (D, North Brunswick, 2027), Claribel A. "Clary" Azcona-Barber (D, New Brunswick, 2025), Charles Kenny (D, Woodbridge Township, 2025), Leslie Koppel (D, Monroe Township, 2026), Chanelle Scott McCullum (D, Piscataway, 2025) and Charles E. Tomaro (D, Edison, 2026).

Constitutional officers are: Clerk Nancy Pinkin (D, 2025, East Brunswick), Sheriff Mildred S. Scott (D, 2025, Piscataway) and Surrogate Claribel Cortes (D, 2026; North Brunswick).

=== Politics ===
As of March 2011, there were a total of 8,366 registered voters in Middlesex, of which 2,094 (25.0%) were registered as Democrats, 1,605 (19.2%) were registered as Republicans and 4,662 (55.7%) were registered as Unaffiliated. There were 5 voters registered as Libertarians or Greens.

United States presidential election results for Middlesex
Year	Republican		Democratic		Third party(ies)	
Year	No.	%	No.	%	No.	%
2024	3,709	53.64%	3,050	44.11%	156	2.26%
2020	3,608	50.19%	3,460	48.14%	120	1.67%
2016	3,257	52.84%	2,696	43.74%	211	3.42%
2012	2,645	47.71%	2,819	50.85%	80	1.44%
2008	3,185	52.16%	2,837	46.46%	84	1.38%
2004	3,202	53.23%	2,755	45.80%	58	0.96%

In the 2012 presidential election, Democrat Barack Obama received 50.8% of the vote (2,819 cast), ahead of Republican Mitt Romney with 47.7% (2,645 votes), and other candidates with 1.4% (80 votes), among the 5,587 ballots cast by the borough's 8,481 registered voters (43 ballots were spoiled), for a turnout of 65.9%. In the 2008 presidential election, Republican John McCain received 51.6% of the vote (3,185 cast), ahead of Democrat Barack Obama with 45.9% (2,837 votes) and other candidates with 1.4% (84 votes), among the 6,177 ballots cast by the borough's 8,612 registered voters, for a turnout of 71.7%. In the 2004 presidential election, Republican George W. Bush received 53.0% of the vote (3,202 ballots cast), outpolling Democrat John Kerry with 45.6% (2,755 votes) and other candidates with 0.7% (58 votes), among the 6,040 ballots cast by the borough's 8,376 registered voters, for a turnout percentage of 72.1.

Gubernatorial election results for Middlesex
Year	Republican		Democratic		Third party(ies)	
Year	No.	%	No.	%	No.	%
2025	2,565	48.07%	2,736	51.27%	35	0.66%
2021	2,401	57.22%	1,751	41.73%	44	1.05%
2017	2,022	55.61%	1,524	41.91%	90	2.48%
2013	2,478	69.43%	1,045	29.28%	46	1.29%
2009	2,410	58.79%	1,307	31.89%	382	9.32%
2005	1,878	48.28%	1,802	46.32%	210	5.40%

In the 2013 gubernatorial election, Republican Chris Christie received 69.4% of the vote (2,478 cast), ahead of Democrat Barbara Buono with 29.3% (1,045 votes), and other candidates with 1.3% (46 votes), among the 3,617 ballots cast by the borough's 8,552 registered voters (48 ballots were spoiled), for a turnout of 42.3%. In the 2009 gubernatorial election, Republican Chris Christie received 58.2% of the vote (2,410 ballots cast), ahead of Democrat Jon Corzine with 31.6% (1,307 votes), Independent Chris Daggett with 8.1% (336 votes) and other candidates with 1.1% (46 votes), among the 4,142 ballots cast by the borough's 8,374 registered voters, yielding a 49.5% turnout.

United States Senate election results for Middlesex1
Year	Republican		Democratic		Third party(ies)	
Year	No.	%	No.	%	No.	%
2024	3,326	51.53%	2,950	45.70%	179	2.77%
2018	2,699	53.95%	2,128	42.53%	176	3.52%
2012	2,341	45.62%	2,698	52.58%	92	1.79%
2006	1,686	49.78%	1,587	46.86%	114	3.37%

United States Senate election results for Middlesex2
Year	Republican		Democratic		Third party(ies)	
Year	No.	%	No.	%	No.	%
2020	3,463	49.27%	3,384	48.15%	181	2.58%
2014	1,449	52.50%	1,266	45.87%	45	1.63%
2013	1,443	63.82%	790	34.94%	28	1.24%
2008	2,926	52.31%	2,541	45.42%	127	2.27%

== Education ==
The Middlesex Board of Education serves public school students in pre-kindergarten through twelfth grade. As of the 2020–21 school year, the district, comprised of five schools, had an enrollment of 2,018 students and 182.2 classroom teachers (on an FTE basis), for a student–teacher ratio of 11.1:1. Schools in the district (with 2020–21 enrollment data from the National Center for Education Statistics) are Hazelwood Elementary School with 189 students in grades Pre-K–3, Parker Elementary School with 178 students in grades K–3, Watchung Elementary School with 256 students in grades K–3, Woodland Intermediate School was split off of the middle school starting in 2020–2021, Von E. Mauger Middle School with 759 students in grades 4–8 and Middlesex High School with 619 students in grades 9–12. The district's superintendent is Roberta Freeman.

Eighth grade students from all of Middlesex County are eligible to apply to attend the high school programs offered by the Middlesex County Magnet Schools, a county-wide vocational school district that offers full-time career and technical education at its schools in East Brunswick, Edison, Perth Amboy, Piscataway and Woodbridge Township, with no tuition charged to students for attendance.

== Parks ==
There are many parks scattered throughout Middlesex Borough.

Victor Crowell Park, commonly known as Duck Pond, offers park equipment for kids, a walking trail, and small docks with benches to view the water. In August 2023, there was an alligator that was reported to be in the pond, with police discharging their weapon and failing to stop the alligator. Eventually the alligator was caught approximately two miles away off Possumtown Road in neighboring Piscataway Township.

Mountain View Park is a large open space in the center of the borough. It has many amenities and offers a view of the first range of the Watchung Mountains.

Lincoln Park is located at the site of the Central Railroad of New Jersey train station that served the community, originally known as Lincoln, for many years. The statue of Abraham Lincoln by Alfonso Pelzer, his original work which was copied after his death, was installed in the park in 1898.

== Transportation ==
=== Roads and highways ===
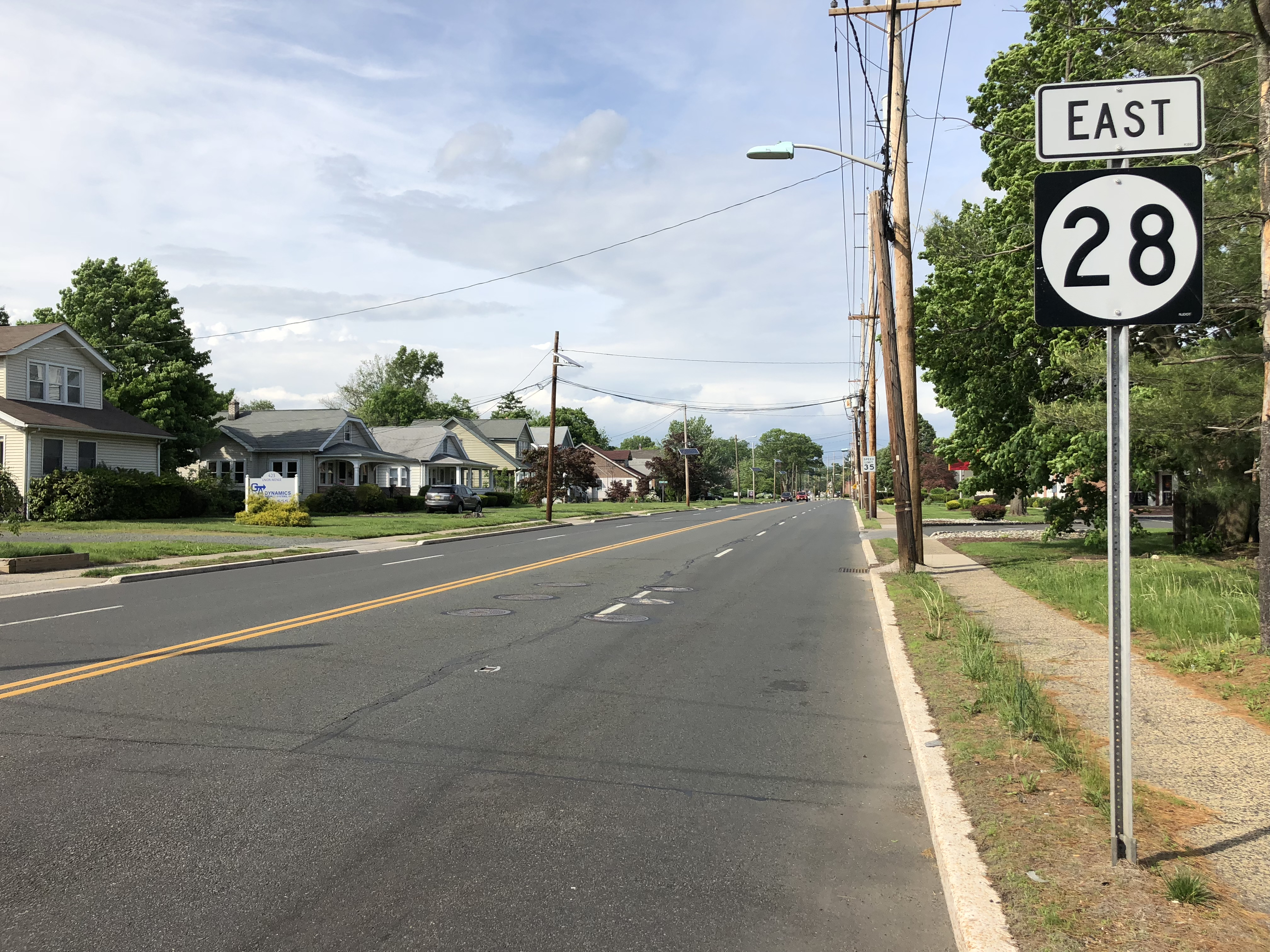
Route 28, the most prominent highway in Middlesex

As of May 2010, the borough had a total of 54.86 miles (88.29 km) of roadways, of which 48.23 miles (77.62 km) were maintained by the municipality, 3.49 miles (5.62 km) by Middlesex County and 3.14 miles (5.05 km) by the New Jersey Department of Transportation

New Jersey Route 28 is the main highway passing through Middlesex. Route 28 provides access to Interstate 287; U.S. Route 22 lies just north of the borough.

=== Public transportation ===
NJ Transit provides service to and from the Port Authority Bus Terminal in Midtown Manhattan on the 114 route and to Newark on the 65 and 66 routes. Historically there was a railroad station in the Lincoln neighborhood, whose is marked by a public park with a statue of Abraham Lincoln at its center.

== Notable people ==
People who were born in, residents of, or otherwise closely associated with Middlesex include:

- Tige Andrews (1920–2007), actor who appeared in The Mod Squad
- Margaret Bourke-White (1904–1971), photo-journalist whose childhood home, the Joseph and Minnie White House at 243 Hazelwood Avenue in the Beechwood Heights section of the town, is listed in the New Jersey Register of Historic Places and the National Register of Historic Places
- Mary Mohler (born 1984), former competition swimmer and former world record-holder in the Women's 200-meter butterfly (long course)
- Rocco Rock (1953–2002), professional wrestler, half of The Public Enemy with Johnny Grunge
- Tom Scharpling (born 1969), host of internet radio show and podcast The Best Show with Tom Scharpling
- Charlie Weis (born 1956), former head coach of the Notre Dame Fighting Irish football team and MHS graduate
