= Bound Brook High School =

High school in Somerset County, New Jersey, US

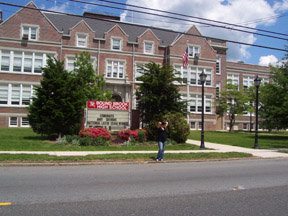

Location
- 111 West Union Avenue; Bound Brook, Somerset County, New Jersey 08805; United States; 40.5679°N 74.5363°W

Information
- Type: Public high school
- Motto: Enter to Learn, Go Forth to Serve
- School district: Bound Brook School District
- NCES School ID: 340210005144
- Principal: Edward Smith
- Faculty: 58.0 FTEs
- Grades: 9-12
- Enrollment: 579 (as of 2024–25)
- Student to teacher ratio: 10.0:1
- Colors: Red and white
- Athletics conference: Skyland Conference (general); Big Central Football Conference (football)
- Team name: Crusaders
- Website: bbhs.bbrook.org

Bound Brook High School is a comprehensive community public high school that serves students in ninth through twelfth grades from Bound Brook, in Somerset County, in the U.S. state of New Jersey, operating as the lone secondary school of the Bound Brook School District. Students from South Bound Brook attend the district's high school as part of a sending/receiving relationship with the South Bound Brook School District.

As of the 2024–25 school year, the school had an enrollment of 579 students and 58 classroom teachers (on an FTE basis), for a student–teacher ratio of approximately 10:1. There were 422 students (72.9% of enrollment) eligible for free lunch and 62 (10.7% of students) eligible for reduced-cost lunch.

Bound Brook High School is the only high school in Somerset County with the "School Choice" designation. Students outside of Bound Brook can apply to attend one of Bound Brook's two academies: Bio-medical Sciences or Engineering. The school began a 1:1 iPad initiative program in the 2012–13 school year. Since then, the school has gone wireless providing each student and teacher with an iPad and equipping every classroom with smart boards and projectors.

== History ==
The district's first graduating class was in 1904. Washington School was constructed for students in grades 9–12 at a cost of $60,000 (equivalent to $2,150,000 in 2025) and opened in September 1908. When it opened, the Bound Brook district established sending/receiving relationships under which it accepted students from communities including Hillsborough Township and Montgomery Township.

From 1925 to 1935, until the opening of Dunellen High School, students from Dunellen had attended Bound Brook High School.

Students from Middlesex, New Jersey had attended the district's high school until the new Middlesex High School opened in September 1959 with students in ninth and tenth grades. Middlesex students entering eleventh and twelfth grades continued their education at the Bound Brook school through graduation.

== Awards, recognition and rankings ==
The school was the 290th-ranked public high school in New Jersey out of 339 schools statewide in New Jersey Monthly magazine's September 2014 cover story on the state's "Top Public High Schools", using a new ranking methodology. The school had been ranked 290th in the state of 328 schools in 2012, after being ranked 288th in 2010 out of 322 schools listed. The magazine ranked the school 243rd in the magazine's September 2008 issue, which surveyed 316 schools across the state.

The school has improved drastically over the past few years, with the average SAT score improving from 2008 to 2012 by 14.9%, the highest percentage increase during that time period among the 11 community public high schools in Somerset County and the 27th-highest percentage increase in SAT scores among the schools included in the survey.

== Curriculum ==
=== Honors placement ===
Students may be recommended for Honors placement if they have an average grade of 92 or above, if they have completed summer assignments/projects that are assigned. Honors placement also requires teacher's recommendation. Students in an Honors placement course are dismissed from the course if their Honors placement course grade point drops below an expected range. Students dismissed from the course and be placed into an academic level course.

=== Advanced Placement offerings ===
Bound Brook High School offers few Advanced Placement courses, due to its small student population and limited resources. AP courses rotate yearly.

The following AP programs are offered by Bound Brook High School:

- AP Calculus AB
- AP English Language and Composition
- AP English Literature and Composition
- AP United States History
- AP Statistics

== Extracurricular activities ==
=== Athletics ===
The Bound Brook High School Crusaders compete in the Skyland Conference, which is comprised of public and private high schools in Hunterdon, Somerset and Warren counties in northern New Jersey and operates under the jurisdiction of the New Jersey State Interscholastic Athletic Association (NJSIAA). With 472 students in grades 10–12, the school was classified by the NJSIAA for the 2019–20 school year as Group I for most athletic competition purposes, which included schools with an enrollment of 75 to 476 students in that grade range. The football team competes in Division 1A of the Big Central Football Conference, which includes 60 public and private high schools in Hunterdon, Middlesex, Somerset, Union and Warren counties, which are broken down into 10 divisions by size and location. The school was classified by the NJSIAA as Group I South for football for 2024–2026, which included schools with 185 to 482 students.

The boys basketball team won the Group III state championship in 1937 (defeating Weehawken High School in the final game of the tournament playoffs) and 1957 (vs. Hillside High School). The 1937 team won the Group III state title with 34-29 victory in the championship game against Woodrow Wilson of Weehawken.

The wrestling team won the Central Jersey Group I state sectional title in 1980, 1981, 1984, 1998–2001, 2003 and 2012–2014, and won the North II Group I title in 2015. The team won the Group I state championship in 2012–2015. In March 2011, Andrew Campolattano became just the second four-time New Jersey state champion, when he pinned Cherokee's Mike Zeuli in just 47 seconds in the state final, finishing his high school wrestling career with a 175–1 record. Craig DeLaCruz won the 2013 state championship in dramatic fashion, becoming Bound Brook's 19th state champion, the most of any in Somerset County. The 2012 boys wrestling team, guided by head coach Kyle Franey, the Courier News Coach of the year, won its first Group I state championship, defeating Hanover Park High School in the final. The 2013 team, led by head coach Shaun Cleary, won its second consecutive Group I state championship, again defeating Hanover Park.

The boys track team won the spring / outdoor track state championship in Group I in 1989.

The softball team won the Group I state championship in 1994 (defeating Pompton Lakes High School in the finals of the playoffs), 1995 (vs. Pequannock Township High School) and 1997 (vs. Wallington High School). The 1994 team finished the season with a 24-2 record after winning the Group I title with a 1-0 win against Pompton Lakes in the playoff finals. The team won its second consecutive title in 1995 with a 6–5 win in the Group I championship game against Pequannock, a team that was making its first appearance in the finals. The 1997 team finished the season with a record of 31–0 after winning the Group I title with a 3–0 defeat of Wallington in the championship game.

The boys soccer team won the 2004 Central, Group I state sectional championship with a string of three shutout wins, defeating Jonathan Dayton High School 3–0 in the first round, Highland Park High School 2–0 in the semifinals, and edging Metuchen High School 1–0 in the finals to take the title.

The 2013 spring track and field team were the Somerset County champion in 100m, 200m and 400m races and also state finalist.

The girls basketball team won the Group I state championship in 2017 (against runner-up University High School in the playoff finals) and was declared as South I regional champion in 2020 after the finals were canceled in the wake of COVID-19. The team won the 2016 Central Jersey Group I championship, their first sectional title since 1989, defeating Middlesex High School by a score of 67–52 in the tournament final.

=== Sports offered ===
Interscholastic sports offered at the school include:

- Boys and Girls Cross County
- Boys and Girls Soccer
- Boys and Girls Tennis
- Football
- Cheerleading
- Wrestling
- Boys and Girls Basketball
- Spring Track and Field
- Softball
- Baseball
- Boys and GIrls Volleyball

==== National Honor Society ====
The National Honor Society is an organization that recognizes outstanding students from grades 10 through 12. It was formed in 1921 as a result of the desire of educators to promote student excellence. The Bound Brook High School chapter was founded in June 1962. The pillars of the Society are Scholarship, Character, Service, and Leadership. Chapter meetings are held bi-monthly and community services are provided through various ongoing projects.

==== Team 56-Robbe Xtreme ====
FIRST Robotics Competition Team 56 is the result of a 17-year partnership between Bound Brook High School and Ethicon. Team 56 was the first team created by Johnson & Johnson, and one of the first FIRST Robotics teams in the state of New Jersey. '56 was part of the four teams that organized a competition at Drexel University in Pennsylvania, which led to the establishment of the Philadelphia Regional Competition for FIRST.

Robotics has led to the high school's involvement with programs Project Lead the Way like the engineering and Biomedical Program, where students practically have firsthand experience as to what professionals do in their respective fields, Bound Brook High School Robotics has also brought about the start of robotics in the Smalley Middle and elementary schools, so students can begin an interest with STEM (science, math, and technology) at an even younger age.

The team has won numerous awards and made many improvements over the years and brought great publicity to the town:

- 1999: 1st place national AutoDesk animation contest, and Best Offensive at Philadelphia Alliance Regional
- 2000: J&J Mid-Atlantic regional Chrysler spirit award, Made scholarships available to BBHS students, 1st place "Havoc at the Hill" invitational
- 2001: 1st place at J&J Mid-Atlantic regional, Philadelphia Regional, Mt. Olive invitational, Leadership in control at Philadelphia Regional, and Divisional semi-finalist, FIRST Championship at Epcot
- 2003: J&J Mid-Atlantic regional sportsmanship Award, semi-finalist at Philadelphia regional
- 2004: 1st place, J&J Mid-Atlantic regional
- 2005: 1st place, Philadelphia regional, New Jersey regional finalist, General Motors Industrial Design Award, 4th-place finish Sacramento regional, finalist at J&J Mid-Atlantic regional, Motorola Quality Award at J&J Mid-Atlantic regional, National Galileo Divisional champions and National Championship finalist
- 2006: General Motors Industrial Design Award, Chesapeake Regional and NJ regional judges award
- 2007: Finalist and Rockwell automation innovation in control award at Florida regional Finalist and Rockwell automation innovation in control award at New York City regional
- 2008: Chief Delphi technology Award and Xerox creativity award
- 2009: New York City regional winner, Philadelphia Regional winner and National Galileo Divisional Finalist
- 2010: Philadelphia Regional winner
- 2011: Philadelphia Regional semi-finalist and Xerox creativity award

== Administration ==
The school's principal is Edward Smith. Core members of the school's administration include the two assistant principals and the athletic director.

== Notable alumni ==
- Tige Andrews (1920–2007), character actor known for his law-enforcement roles on The Mod Squad and The Detectives Starring Robert Taylor
- Jeffrey Chiesa (born 1965), 59th Attorney General of New Jersey and former United States Senator from New Jersey
- Patrick X. Gallagher (1935-2019), mathematician and Columbia University professor
- Luigi Jannuzzi (born 1952), playwright
- James W. Kelly Jr. (1911–1990), politician who was Mayor of East Orange, New Jersey from 1958 to 1970
- Mekhi Lewis (born 1999), freestyle and folkstyle wrestler, who was the first NCAA wrestling national champion for Virginia Tech
- Ronald Naldi (born 1941/42), lyric tenor
- William E. Ozzard (1915–2002), politician who served as President of the New Jersey Senate in 1963
- Joseph D. Patero (1932–2020), politician who served in the New Jersey General Assembly from 1974 to 1986 and from 1988 to 1991
- Mike Sandusky (born 1935), NFL football player who played for the Pittsburgh Steelers from 1957 to 1965
- Gerald Shargel (1944–2022), defense attorney known for his work defending mobsters and celebrities
