= Roger Bourke White =

American businessman

Roger and his two sons, Toby and Roger Jr., 2000

Roger Bourke White (1911–2002), a Cleveland businessman, co-founded Glastic Corporation with Richard C. Newpher. Glastic, located in South Euclid, Ohio, was one of the first makers of fiberglass insulators for the electrical industry, and now makes fiber optic cable.

Roger's work was part of Cleveland's post-war boom that swelled the city to 7th largest in the nation in the 1950s—just behind Detroit. It also diversified the manufacturing base of the Northeast Ohio area, so that when Ohio's Steel Belt turned into the Rust Belt in the late 70s and early 80s, companies that Roger had founded and worked with cushioned the crunch and contributed to the area's reinvention as a diversified manufacturing area.

== Early life ==
Roger was born in 1911 in Boundbrook, NJ to Joseph and Minnie White. He had two older sisters, Margaret Bourke-White and Ruth. Margaret Bourke-White is generally considered one of the great photojournalists of the 20th century. His father was a non-practicing Jew whose father came from Poland, and his mother, Minnie Bourke, was of Irish Catholic descent. White grew up near Bound Brook, New Jersey (the Joseph and Minnie White House in Middlesex). He described his parents as "Free thinkers who were intensely interested in advancing themselves and humanity through personal achievement," attributing the success of their children in part to this quality. He was not surprised at his sister Margaret's success, saying "[she] was not unfriendly or aloof".

Roger graduated from MIT in 1934.

After graduation he worked first for Union Carbide in New York City. Union Carbide asked him to move to Cleveland Ohio to sell welding and cutting products to the steel industry there. It was in Cleveland that he met and became a business partner with James T. Lewis at Lewis Welding.

During his early years in Cleveland he became part of the Gold Coasters, a small men's group. While there, he and his friend Dick Newpher built a sailing kayak from a kit. They didn't like it. It was flimsy, so they worked it over, redesigned it. They took their new design to the Mentor Harbor Yachting Club, Mentor, Ohio and there sailed rings around the regular sailboats.

Roger also loved camping and flying airplanes. He would take days-long trips into the wild woodlands around the Great Lakes. He flew planes as small as Piper Cubs and as large as twin-engined Piper Apaches.

== Career ==
In 1944 he worked on the Manhattan Project which produced the first atomic bomb, and in 1945 he married Anne "Mike" White, and they had two sons, Roger Bourke White Jr. and Jonathan Bourke "Toby" White, and six grandchildren.

In 1946, as part of America's transition from a wartime to a post-war economy, Roger moved from the steel industry to start a brand new industry: the high-tech fiberglass electrical insulator industry. He started Glastic Corporation with Dick Newpher. He became a leader in this field, producing numerous technical conference papers, trade journal articles and a text book on reinforced plastics. Roger's work produced smaller insulators, which reduced the size of electric motors, leading to the proliferation of small motors that now help us every day.

Roger was a member of the Cleveland Skating Club. He was a tenacious tennis player and clever curler. He skied and snorkeled, so vacation time took the family north and south. In the Bahamas he found a new sport in addition to snorkeling: he would perch on the front of a small outboard board boat and chase sharks across sandy shallows. If they let him get close, he would shoot them with a bow and arrow.

Like his sister Margaret, Roger enjoyed photography. He also loved making home movies.

He sold out of Glastic in 1968. After that he became Chairman of Lauren Manufacturing Company, New Philadelphia, Ohio, which made extruded rubber products for the auto industry, window sealers for skyscrapers, and other sealers for the Alaskan Pipeline. He founded another major manufacturing business, Pultrusions Corp., Aurora, Ohio which made pultruded fiberglass products. Their products were used for overhead racks on buses, sewage treatment paddles, tent poles and flag poles for bicycles.

He married Bonnie Crislip in 1976.

== Retiree ==
He retired from business in 1980, but stayed active helping people in other ways. He linked up with the American Go Association to promote the playing of Go in the United States, serving as Membership Secretary and touring the country to visit local clubs. He also founded The American Go Foundation, which supports the development of American Go by providing schools and libraries with playing materials, offering children scholarships to study the game, subsidizing Go teachers and in many other ways. Go (in Korean paduk or baduk) is a chess-like game which is widely played in the Far East.
