= Guy Sterling =

American journalist, author and historian

- Born: September 23, 1948 (age 78); Orange, New Jersey
- Education: University of Virginia and Columbia University Graduate School of Journalism
- Occupations: Journalist and Author

Guy Sterling (born September 23, 1948) is an American journalist, author and historian. He spent most of his 35-year newspaper career as a reporter with The Star-Ledger in Newark, New Jersey, primarily covering the courts and criminal justice matters, the Meadowlands Sports Complex and the New Jersey Mafia.

== Background and early life ==
Sterling was born in Orange Memorial Hospital in Orange, New Jersey, to father Robert Sterling Sr. and mother Florence M. O’Mara. Raised in Dunellen, New Jersey, he graduated from Dunellen High School. He earned his undergraduate degree from the University of Virginia in Charlottesville (class of 1970) and a master's degree in journalism from the Columbia University Graduate School of Journalism (class of 1972). He began his daily newspaper career in 1970 as a municipal government reporter with the Courier News in Plainfield, New Jersey, and ended it in Newark. Over the course of his career, Sterling routinely published as many as 200 bylined stories a year.

== Author and independent researcher ==
Sterling has authored two books: Elvis in Roanoke, published in 1977 when he was a reporter with The Roanoke Times & World-News (1975–78) in Roanoke, Virginia, and The Famous, the Familiar and the Forgotten: 350 Notable Newarkers in 2014. He updated the Newark book on its tenth anniversary with an online edition. In 2011 and 2012, he also wrote and produced a series of radio pieces on Newark's history for WBGO Jazz Radio 88.3 in Newark. They aired as a segment entitled "Guy Sterling's Newark" on the "WBGO Journal."

== Career at The Star-Ledger ==
Sterling spent almost 30 years as a general assignment reporter in Newark, starting in 1980 and retiring in 2009. He won a national award for excellence in music writing and was a member of The Star-Ledger staff that won a Pulitzer Prize for breaking news reporting. A story of his was used as the theme for an award-winning season of the HBO series The Sopranos and, when he left daily journalism, he was given a retirement party by the mob and a plaque for his organized crime coverage by the U.S. Justice Department. Sterling was a lead reporter for The Star-Ledger for its coverage of the fatal Boland Hall fire at Seton Hall University in 2000, stories that continued for years. They earned the paper its first-ever selection as a Pulitzer Prize finalist along with the American Society of Newspaper Editors Jesse Laventhol Prize for Deadline News Reporting by a Team in 2001.

Other major stories he covered included

- 1980 – Covered all legal proceedings against an Irvington man charged and later convicted of killing a Port Authority police officer on a PATH train, the weeks-long PATH strike. and broke the story that 1960's anti-war activist and counterculture ringleader Jerry Rubin had gone mainstream and joined a Wall Street brokerage firm.
- 1981 – Wrote a series of stories on the growing problem of missing persons in New Jersey that led to legislation creating a missing persons bureau inside the New Jersey State Police, among the first articles in the mainstream press on the federal government's interest in marijuana's potential as medicine and the subsequent approval of synthetic THC as an antiemetic. and a series of investigative pieces about corruption and mismanagement inside the New Jersey Commission for the Blind and Visually Impaired, a state agency based in Newark, that led to a probe by the Attorney General's Office.
- 1982 – Wrote an investigative piece he wrote on the growing problem of missing persons in New Jersey led the state Legislature to create a Division of Missing Persons within the New Jersey State Police and was the only New Jersey–based reporter to interview Richard Nixon after the former president moved to the New York area to rehabilitate his image in the final years of his life. They spoke on two occasions.
- 1983 – Covered the “CBS Murders” trial in New York in which a Keansburg handyman was convicted of killing four people, and the gangland slaying of Peter A. "Peter Rabbit" Campisi, a member of a Newark-based organized crime group whose body was found in the trunk of a car in New York, as well as the choking death of Peter S. "Petey Black" Campisi in June 2002.
- 1984 – Broke all the stories about an undercover state investigation ("Operation Bacchus") of the liquor industry that resulted in numerous charges. and all the stories on a suspicious harness race at the Meadowlands Racetrack that triggered a riot by horseplayers and a second one at Garden State Park several years later that prompted a state investigation dubbed "Operation Longshot."
- 1985 – Covered the “Pizza Connection” trial in New York City, the longest criminal trial in U.S. federal court history (lasting into 1987) in which 20 defendants, including six men from New Jersey as well as the former boss of the Sicilian mob, were accused of laundering Mafia drug money through a network of American pizza shops.
- 1986 – Honored by the New Jersey Fire Prevention and Protection Association for a four-part series on the state of firefighting in New Jersey.
- 1987 – Worked with state Sen. Richard J. Codey in uncovering faulty hiring practices at a state psychiatric hospital in Monmouth County.
- 1988 – Broke the stories that reputed Genovese crime family boss and former pro prizefighter John DiGilio had gone missing. and was later found murdered.
- 1989 – Flew to Richmond, VA, to lead the paper's coverage of the arrest of John List, an inconspicuous businessman who murdered his wife, mother and three children before fleeing their home in Westfield, NJ, and becoming one of America's most wanted fugitives for almost 18 years and the mysterious death of Grateful Dead fan Adam Katz at a Meadowlands Arena concert and a subsequent grand jury investigation.
- 1989-92 – Covered the federal racketeering trial in Newark of Genovese crime family boss Louis "Bobby" Manna, who was accused of plotting the murder of rival mob kingpin John Gotti among other charges.
- 1992-93 – Covered the longest criminal trial in New Jersey state court history, a year-long racketeering case in Newark against Robert "Cabert" Bisaccia and other reputed members of the Gambino crime family's New Jersey crew that ended in the convictions of all but one of the defendants.
- 1994 – Conducted a jailhouse interview with reputed New Jersey mob capo Anthony (Tumac) Accetturo after he turned state government informant. and wrote the story that prosecutors would seek the death penalty in the New Jersey murder case that produced Megan's Law.
- 1996 – Found former Seton Hall basketball star and Utah Jazz first-round draft pick Luther Wright a patient in an Essex County, NJ, psychiatric hospital. A subsequent story on Wright's life and the circumstances that left him institutionalized – co-authored by Sterling and entitled “Whose Dream Was It?” – won the New Jersey Press Association award for best news feature story of the year. and uncovered serious problems inside the Newark Jazz Festival that ultimately led to its undoing.
- 1998 – Was left the only press copy of a videotaped suicide note made by George Weingartner, a former Bayonne policeman and reputed crew boss of the Genovese crime family who was facing trial on state racketeering charges and spent 17 years working to free New Jersey inmate Vincent James Landano, who was wrongfully convicted of killing an off-duty Newark policeman during the robbery of a Kearny, NJ, check-cashing business in August 1976. After years of legal wrangling that included a groundbreaking U.S. Supreme Court decision, the conviction was eventually overturned and Landano was acquitted of all charges at a 1998 retrial in Jersey City.
- 2000 – Was featured in an Editor & Publisher article and editorial focusing on The Star-Ledger's decision to withhold the names of suspects in the fatal Seton Hall dormitory fire while the investigation proceeded.
- 2004 – Covered the federal murder trial of Philadelphia crime boss Joseph “Skinny Joey” Merlino in Newark that ended in acquittal.
- 2006 – Debunked a claim by notorious murderer Richard “The Iceman” Kuklinski that he was one of history's most prolific serial killers.
- 2007 – Broke the story that reputed Genovese crime family capo and accused murderer Michael Coppola was arrested on Manhattan's Upper West Side after 11 years as a fugitive from a Bridgewater, New Yersey, mob execution.
- 2008 – Disproved a developer's claim that an aging building in downtown Newark wasn't the Palace Chop House, where mobster Dutch Schultz was murdered in one of the most notorious gangland slayings in organized crime history and when he retired from the paper, was given a plaque for his coverage of organized crime by the U.S. Justice Department and a retirement party by the mob. The Sopranos creator David Chase credited one of his stories with serving as the theme for the series’ 2003 season, shows that were honored the following year with the primetime Emmy Award for Outstanding Drama Series, the first time a cable TV program won the award.

== Retirement ==
Following retirement in 2009, Sterling became involved in a number of civic projects in Newark, including

- 2009-21 – Helped lead the fight against the privatization of Newark's public water system and uncover corruption inside the agency managing the city's watershed property, an effort that resulted in two government investigations and multiple indictments and convictions.
- 2010 – Organized and moderated the centennial commemoration of a fire that claimed the lives of 26 lady garment workers in a Newark sweatshop, the city's worst fatal fire.
- 2016 – Organized and moderated a year-long series of monthly conversations with notable Newarkers at the Newark Public Library as part of the city's celebration of its 350th anniversary and spearheaded a drive to save Newark's nationally landmarked historic Krueger Mansion. Sterling's progress was followed in articles by several German news organizations, including Deutsche Welle.
- 2019 – Director of oral history and a co-sponsor of “In Search of a Just City,” an exhibition on the old Essex County Jail (1837–1971) at Newark's Hahne's Building.
- 2022 – Testified at a New Jersey Historic Sites Council hearing in opposition to the removal of the Christopher Columbus statue in Newark's Washington Park (Harriet Tubman Square).
- 2019-24 – Chosen six consecutive years as one of New Jersey's 100 Irish-American leaders by InsiderNJ.
