= Dunellen High School =

High school in Middlesex County, New Jersey, US

Location
- 411 First Street; Dunellen, Middlesex County, New Jersey 08812; United States
- 40.592433°N 74.468105°W

Information
- Type: Public high school
- Established: 1935
- School district: Dunellen Public Schools
- NCES School ID: 340402003286
- Principal: Paul Lynch
- Faculty: 36.1 FTEs
- Grades: 9-12
- Enrollment: 409 (as of 2024–25)
- Student to teacher ratio: 11.3:1
- Colors: Scarlet and navy blue
- Athletics conference: Greater Middlesex Conference (general); Big Central Football Conference (football)
- Team name: Destroyers
- Rival: Middlesex High School
- Publication: The Spectrum (literary magazine)
- Newspaper: The Argus
- Yearbook: Exodus
- Website: dunellenschools.org/35289_3

Dunellen High School (DHS) is a four-year comprehensive public high school that serves students in ninth through twelfth grades from Dunellen in Middlesex County, in the U.S. state of New Jersey, operating as the lone secondary school of the Dunellen Public Schools.

As of the 2024–25 school year, the school had an enrollment of 409 students and 36.1 classroom teachers (on an FTE basis), for a student–teacher ratio of 11.3:1. There were 177 students (43.3% of enrollment) eligible for free lunch and 23 (5.6% of students) eligible for reduced-cost lunch.

== History ==
The high school was completed in Fall 1935 by the Public Works Administration at a cost of $80,000 (equivalent to $1.9 million in 2025) and was scheduled to have an enrollment of 675, of which 20% came from Piscataway. Prior to the completion of the district's own high school, students from Dunellen had attended Plainfield High School (in place from 1906 until 1925) and then Bound Brook High School (from 1925 to 1935). Over the years, the high school also accepted students from Green Brook Township, Manville and Middlesex.

== Awards, recognition and rankings ==
The school was the 132nd-ranked public high school in New Jersey out of 339 schools statewide in New Jersey Monthly magazine's September 2014 cover story on the state's "Top Public High Schools", using a new ranking methodology. The school had been ranked 112th in the state of 328 schools in 2012, after being ranked 110th in 2010 out of 322 schools listed. The magazine ranked the school 166th in its 2008 rankings out of 316 schools statewide. The school was ranked 147th in the magazine's September 2006 issue, which surveyed 316 schools across the state. Schooldigger.com ranked the school 147th out of 381 public high schools statewide in its 2011 rankings (an increase of 92 positions from the 2010 ranking) which were based on the combined percentage of students classified as proficient or above proficient on the mathematics (85.7%) and language arts literacy (92.2%) components of the High School Proficiency Assessment (HSPA).

The school was the 36th-ranked high school in New Jersey in the 2014 U.S. News & World Report Rankings of Best High Schools.

== Extracurricular activities ==
Dunellen has a wide variety of other activities to choose from, including the Biology Club, Chess Club, Chess Team, Choir, Concert band, Marching band, National Art Honor Society, National Honor Society, Drama Club, Exodus, French Club, Spanish Club, Jazz band, Madrigals, Math League, Thespian Society and The Spectrum.

=== Athletics ===
The Dunellen High School Destroyers compete in the Greater Middlesex Conference, comprised of public and private high schools located in the greater Middlesex County area, operating under the supervision of the New Jersey State Interscholastic Athletic Association (NJSIAA). With 285 students in grades 10–12, the school was classified by the NJSIAA for the 2019–20 school year as Group II for most athletic competition purposes, which included schools with an enrollment of 75 to 476 students in that grade range. The football team competes in Division 1B of the Big Central Football Conference, which includes 60 public and private high schools in Hunterdon, Middlesex, Somerset, Union and Warren counties, which are broken down into 10 divisions by size and location. The school was classified by the NJSIAA as Group I North for football for 2024–2026, which included schools with 254 to 474 students.

The school participates in a joint wrestling team with Middlesex High School as the host school / lead agency. The co-op program operates under agreements scheduled to expire at the end of the 2023–24 school year.

The boys basketball team won the Group I state championships in 1943 (defeating runner-up Egg Harbor Township High School in the tournament final), 1946 (vs. Keyport High School) and 1959 (vs. Glen Ridge High School). The 1943 team won the Group I state championship after defeating Roxbury High School 35–31 in the semifinals and then moving on to beat Egg Harbor Township by a score of 43–20 in the playoff finals at Seton Hall.

The 1993 football team finished the season with a 10-0-1 record after winning the NJSIAA Central Jersey Group I state sectional title with a 12–3 victory against Metuchen High School in the championship game. The Destroyers have made eight appearances to the Central Jersey Group I state final. Dunellen is placed in the Gold Division of the Greater Middlesex Conference for football. Dunellen ended its Thanksgiving Day rivalry with Middlesex High School in 2019, after 21 games in the annual series.

== Administration ==
The school's principal is Paul Lynch. His core administration team includes the vice principal.

== Notable alumni ==
- Ed Stasium, record producer and audio engineer
- Guy Sterling (born 1948), journalist, author and historian, who was a reporter with The Star-Ledger
