= Bourke White =

Bourke White or Bourke-White may refer to:

- Margaret Bourke-White, American documentary photographer and photojournalist
- Roger Bourke White, American businessman
