= Middlesex High School =

Public secondary school in Middlesex County, New Jersey, United States

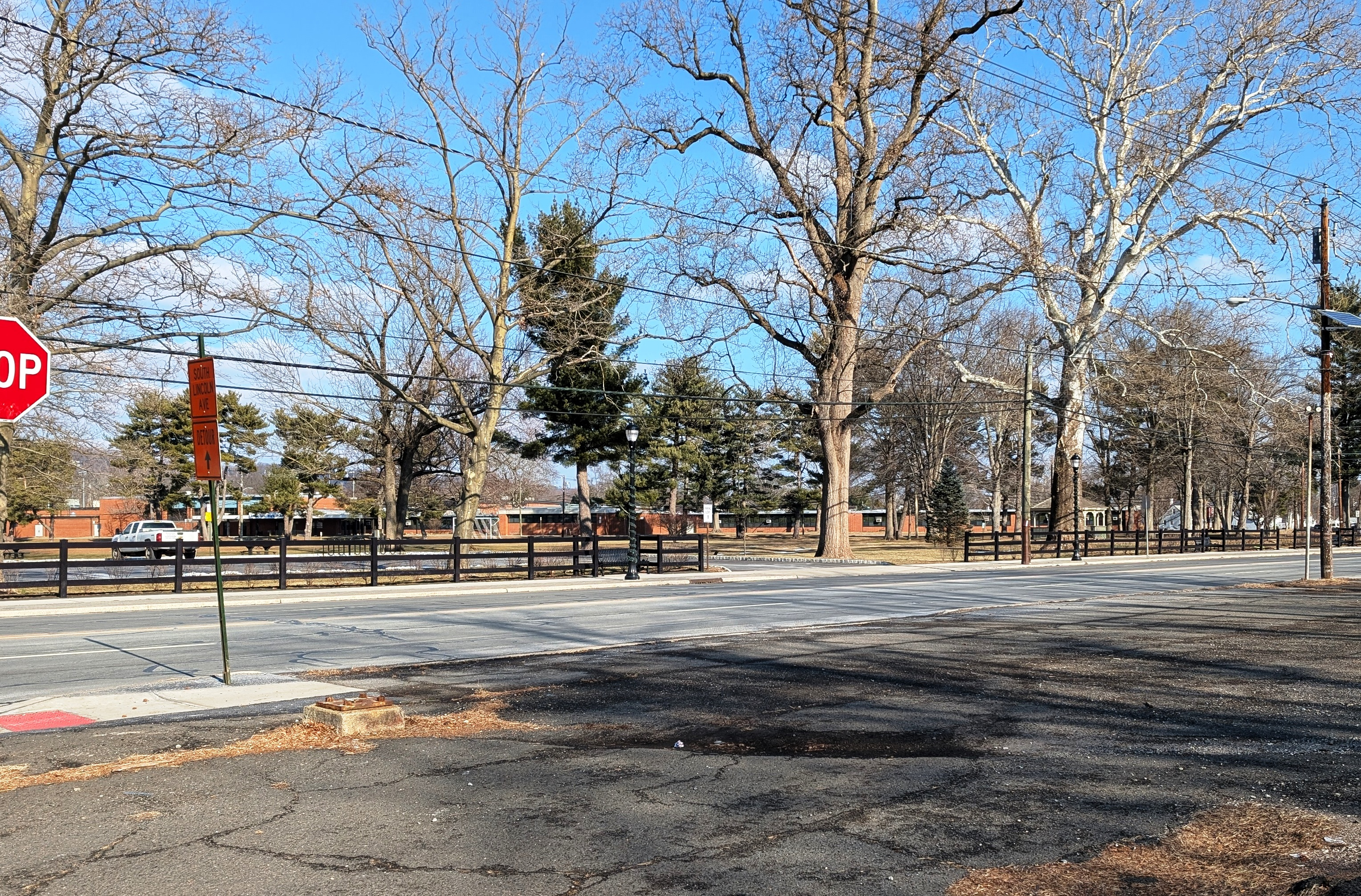

Location
- 300 John F. Kennedy Drive; Middlesex, Middlesex County, New Jersey 08846; United States; 40.5832°N 74.4951°W

Information
- Type: Public high school
- Motto: "Home of the Blue Jays"
- Established: 1959
- NCES School ID: 341005003404
- Principal: Ryan Regan
- Faculty: 55.0 FTEs
- Grades: 9-12
- Enrollment: 597 (as of 2024–25)
- Student to teacher ratio: 10.9:1
- Colors: Royal Blue and white
- Athletics conference: Greater Middlesex Conference (general); Big Central Football Conference (football)
- Team name: Blue Jays
- Rival: Dunellen High School
- Website: mhs.mbschools.org

Middlesex High School (MHS) is a four-year comprehensive public high school located in the center of Middlesex, Middlesex County, in the U.S. state of New Jersey, serving students in ninth through twelfth grades as the lone secondary school of the Middlesex Board of Education. The school is surrounded by Mountain View Park and all of its athletic complexes, including Memorial Field.

As of the 2024–25 school year, the school had an enrollment of 597 students and 55.0 classroom teachers (on an FTE basis), for a student–teacher ratio of 10.9:1. There were 211 students (35.3% of enrollment) eligible for free lunch and 62 (10.4% of students) eligible for reduced-cost lunch.

== History ==
The new high school opened in September 1959 with students in ninth and tenth grades. Prior to that time, students from Middlesex had attended Bound Brook High School. Middlesex students entering eleventh and twelfth grades continued their education at the Bound Brook school through graduation.

== Awards, recognition and rankings ==
The school was the 177th-ranked public high school in New Jersey out of 339 schools statewide in New Jersey Monthly magazine's September 2014 cover story on the state's "Top Public High Schools", using a new ranking methodology. The school had been ranked 155th in the state of 328 schools in 2012, after being ranked 183rd in 2010 out of 322 schools listed. The magazine ranked the school 169th in 2008 out of 316 schools. The school was ranked 148th in the magazine's September 2006 issue, which surveyed 316 schools across the state. Schooldigger.com ranked the school 158th out of 381 public high schools statewide in its 2011 rankings (an increase of 3 positions from the 2010 ranking) which were based on the combined percentage of students classified as proficient or above proficient on the mathematics (83.6%) and language arts literacy (92.4%) components of the High School Proficiency Assessment (HSPA).

== Athletics ==
The Middlesex High School Blue Jays compete in the Greater Middlesex Conference, which includes public and private high schools located in the greater Middlesex County area and operates under the supervision of the New Jersey State Interscholastic Athletic Association (NJSIAA). With 462 students in grades 10–12, the school was classified by the NJSIAA for the 2019–20 school year as Group I for most athletic competition purposes, which included schools with an enrollment of 75 to 476 students in that grade range. The football team competes in Division 1A of the Big Central Football Conference, which includes 60 public and private high schools in Hunterdon, Middlesex, Somerset, Union and Warren counties, which are broken down into 10 divisions by size and location. The school was classified by the NJSIAA as Group I South for football for 2024–2026, which included schools with 185 to 482 students.

The school participates as the host school / lead agency for a joint wrestling team with Dunellen High School. Middlesex and Somerville High School are partners in a co-op ice hockey program with Bernards High School. These co-op program operate under agreements scheduled to expire at the end of the 2023–24 school year.

The football team won the NJSIAA Central Jersey Group II state sectional championship in 1974, then in Central Jersey Group I in 1981, 1982, 1984 and 2017. The 1974 team finished the season with a 9-0-1 record after winning the first Central Jersey Group II sectional title of the playoff era with a 24–6 victory against Hillsborough High School indoors at the Atlantic City Convention Hall. The 1994 team defeated four-time defending champion South River High School by a score of 14–7 to win the Central Jersey Group I title and finish the season 10–1. In a turnaround from winning only one game in 2016, the football team won the 2017 Central Jersey Group I state sectional tournament with a 33–21 win at Alumni Stadium at Kean University against seventh-seeded Point Pleasant Beach High School in the tournament final. Middlesex ended its Thanksgiving Day rivalry with Dunellen High School in 2019, after 21 games in the annual series.

The boys' wrestling team won the Central Jersey Group I state sectional title in 1985 and 1986.

The baseball team won the Group I state championship in 1990 (defeating New Providence High School in the final game of the tournament playoff), 2007 (vs. Hoboken High School), 2013 (vs. Pompton Lakes High School), 2017 (vs. Emerson Junior-Senior High School), 2018 (vs. Park Ridge High School) and 2021 (vs. New Providence); the six state group titles are tied for eighth-most in the state. The team won the Central Jersey Group I state sectional championship in 1982, 1990, 1992, 1994, 1998, 2003, 2007 (in a 13–3 win over Metuchen High School) and again in 2013 (with a 4–0 win over Shore Regional High School). The team won the Group I state championship in 1990 vs. New Providence High School and again in 2007 (with a 14–12 win over Hoboken High School) and in 2013 (defeating Pompton Lakes High School by a 9–5 score). The team won the Greater Middlesex Conference Tournament (GMCT) Championship in 2012, with a 10–4 win over Sayreville War Memorial High School.

The softball team won the Central Jersey Group I state sectional titles from 2001 through 2004. The team won the New Jersey State Group I championship in 2004, defeating Cedar Grove High School in the playoff finals. Increased enrollment made Middlesex a Group II team in 2005 and they won the Greater Middlesex Conference Tournament (GMCT) championship in 2005 with a 2–1 win in extra innings against East Brunswick High School.

The boys' tennis team won the Central Jersey Group I state sectional title in 2003, and won again in 2007 with a 3–2 win vs. Florence Township Memorial High School.

The boys' basketball team won the Central Jersey Group I state sectional title in 1994, the program's first championship, with a 55–35 win against Piscataway Technical High School in the tournament final.

The boys' cross country team won the Mountain Valley Conference championship in 1982, 1983, 1989, 1991, and 1992.

== Clubs ==
- Kindness Club
- Math League
- Key Club
- Drama Club
- Art Club
- Anime
- Mock trial
- Model United Nations
- Yearbook Club
- Peer Connection Leadership
- National Honors Society

== Administration ==
The principal is Ryan Regan. His core administration team includes the assistant principal.

== Notable alumni ==
- Rocco Rock (1953–2002), professional wrestler
- Tom Scharpling (born 1969), comedian, television writer, producer, music video director, and radio host, best known for hosting the weekly Internet radio call-in comedy program The Best Show with Tom Scharpling
- Charlie Weis (born 1956), former head football coach for the Kansas Jayhawks
