= Courier News =

Daily newspaper in Bridgewater, New Jersey

- Type: Daily newspaper
- Format: Broadsheet
- Owner: USA Today Co.
- Editor: Paul C. Grzella, general manager
- Founded: 1884 (as The Evening News)
- Language: American English
- Headquarters: 92 E Main Street, Somerville, New Jersey 08876 USA
- Country: United States
- Circulation: 1,337 (as of 2024)
- ISSN: 0895-8785
- OCLC number: 14093085
- Website: mycentraljersey.com

Logo in 2003

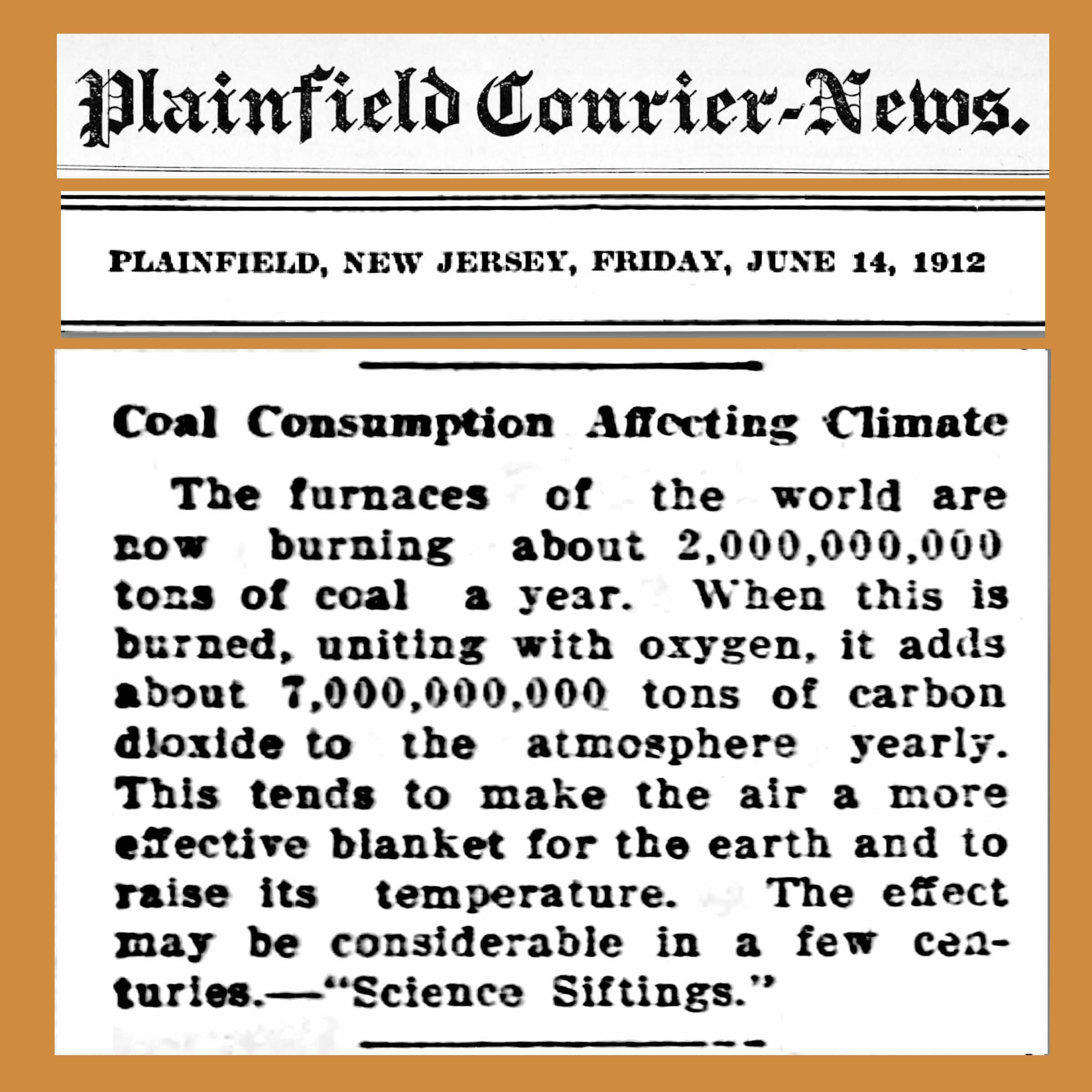
This 1912 Courier-News article described the greenhouse effect, focusing on how burning coal creates carbon dioxide that causes climate change.

The Courier News is a daily newspaper headquartered in Somerville, New Jersey, that serves Somerset County and other areas of Central Jersey. The paper is the result of consolidation and is part of USA Today Co. but traces its origins back to three papers founded in the 1800s. It has been associated with Gannett since 1927 when Frank Gannett became a partner.

== Notable employees ==
- John Curley, former president, chairman and CEO of Gannett Co., Inc, the first editor of USA Today, chairman of the Newspaper Association of America, and a member of the Gannett Board of Directors from 1983 to 2001. His newspaper career spanned 30 years with Gannett and including publisher of the Courier-News. The sports journalism department at Penn State is named in his honor.
- Tom Curley, former president and chief executive officer of the Associated Press. Curley is also a former president, publisher, and one of the co-creators of USA Today. He was publisher of the Courier-News from 1983 until 1985.
- Guy Sterling, retired journalist and currently author of several books and historian in Newark, New Jersey.
- Chauncey F. Stout (d. 1972) joined the paper in 1905 as circulation manager, and later served as publisher from 1927 until his retirement in 1957.
