= Middlesex Board of Education =

School district in Middlesex County, New Jersey, US

Address
- 300 John F. Kennedy Drive Middlesex, Middlesex County, New Jersey, 08846; United States
- Coordinates: 40.57558°N 74.501335°W

District information
- Grades: PreK-12
- Superintendent: Roberta Freeman
- Business administrator: Annette Giordano
- Schools: 5

Students and staff
- Enrollment: 2,018 (as of 2020–21)
- Faculty: 182.2 FTEs
- Student–teacher ratio: 11.1:1

Other information
- District Factor Group: FG
- Website: www.mbschools.org
Ind.	Per pupil	District spending	Rank (*)	K-12 average	%± vs. average
1A	Total Spending	$16,253	13	$18,891	−14.0%
1	Budgetary Cost	12,967	19	14,783	−12.3%
2	Classroom Instruction	7,813	22	8,763	−10.8%
6	Support Services	1,984	26	2,392	−17.1%
8	Administrative Cost	1,450	24	1,485	−2.4%
10	Operations & Maintenance	1,359	12	1,783	−23.8%
13	Extracurricular Activities	345	20	268	28.7%
16	Median Teacher Salary	61,610	26	64,043
Data from NJDoE 2014 Taxpayers' Guide to Education Spending. *Of K-12 districts with 1,800-3,500 students. Lowest spending=1; Highest=68

The Middlesex Board of Education is a comprehensive community public school district that serves students in pre-kindergarten through twelfth grade from Middlesex Borough, in Middlesex County, in the U.S. state of New Jersey. The district includes three elementary schools, a middle school and a high school.

As of the 2020–21 school year, the district, comprised of five schools, had an enrollment of 2,018 students and 182.2 classroom teachers (on an FTE basis), for a student–teacher ratio of 11.1:1.

The district had been classified by the New Jersey Department of Education as being in District Factor Group "FG", the fourth-highest of eight groupings. District Factor Groups organize districts statewide to allow comparison by common socioeconomic characteristics of the local districts. From lowest socioeconomic status to highest, the categories are A, B, CD, DE, FG, GH, I and J.

== Schools ==
Schools in the district (with 2020–21 enrollment data from the National Center for Education Statistics) are:

Elementary schools

- Hazelwood Elementary School with 189 students in grades PreK–3
- Parker Elementary School with 178 students in grades K–3
  - Jason Sirna, principal
- Watchung Elementary School with 256 students in grades K–3
  - Karen Dudley, principal
- Woodland Intermediate School was split off of the middle school starting in 2020-21 to serve grades 4–5
  - Ryan Regan, principal

Middle school

- Von E. Mauger Middle School with 759 students in grades 6–8
  - Remi Christofferson, principal

High school

- Middlesex High School with 619 students in grades 9–12
  - Dana Chibbaro, principal

== Administration ==
Core members of the district's administration are:

- Roberta Freeman, superintendent
- Annette Giordano, board secretary and business administrator

== Board of education ==
The district's board of education is comprised of five members who set policy and oversee the fiscal and educational operation of the district through its administration. As a Type II school district, the board's trustees are elected directly by voters to serve three-year terms of office on a staggered basis, with either one or two seats up for election each year held (since 2012) as part of the November general election. The board appoints a superintendent to oversee the district's day-to-day operations and a business administrator to supervise the business functions of the district.
