= Big Central Football Conference =

The Big Central Football Conference is a football-only athletic league of high schools in Central New Jersey. The 59-team league was formed in 2020.

== History ==
The Big Central consists of the members of the former Mid-State 38 Conference and the football programs from the Greater Middlesex Conference, including public and private high school football teams in Hunterdon, Middlesex, Somerset, Union and Warren counties.

== Divisions ==
For the 2026 and 2027 seasons, there are a total of 12 divisions of the Big Central Football Conference, with teams divided by size, location, and performance:

American Gold

- Elizabeth High School
- St. Joseph High School (Metuchen)
- Union High School
- Westfield High School

American Silver

- Bridgewater-Raritan High School
- Hillsborough High School
- Phillipsburg High School
- Ridge High School

Freedom Gold

- David Brearley High School
- Jonathan Dayton High School
- Highland Park High School
- J. P. Stevens High School
- Roselle Park High School
- South River High School

Freedom Silver

- Belvidere High School
- Bound Brook High School
- Dunellen High School
- Manville High School
- Middlesex High School
- South Hunterdon Regional High School

Liberty Gold

- Colonia High School
- Linden High School
- Plainfield High School
- Rahway High School
- Woodbridge High School

Liberty Silver

- Hunterdon Central Regional High School
- Montgomery High School
- North Hunterdon High School
- Somerville High School
- Watchung Hills Regional High School

National Gold

- East Brunswick High School
- Monroe Township High School
- Old Bridge High School
- Piscataway High School
- South Brunswick High School

National Silver

- Edison High School
- Franklin High School
- North Brunswick High School
- Sayreville War Memorial High School
- St. Thomas Aquinas High School

Patriot Gold

- Delaware Valley Regional High School
- Hillside High School
- New Brunswick High School
- North Plainfield High School
- Voorhees High School

Patriot Silver

- Arthur L. Johnson High School
- Metuchen High School
- New Providence High School
- Perth Amboy High School
- Abraham Clark High School (Roselle)
- Spotswood High School

United Gold

- Carteret High School
- Cranford High School
- Scotch Plains-Fanwood High School
- Summit High School

United Silver

- Bernards High School
- Governor Livingston High School
- John F. Kennedy Memorial High School (Iselin)
- South Plainfield High School
