= Luigi Jannuzzi =

American dramatist

Luigi Jannuzzi (born November 12, 1952) is a contemporary American comedic playwright. A native of New Jersey, Jannuzzi attended Bound Brook High School, Raritan Valley Community College, Salem University, WV and the University of Notre Dame, where in 1977, he received a master's degree. From 1978 - 2012, he taught English, Drama and Creative Writing at Immaculata High School, Somerville, New Jersey.

His play A Bench At The Edge won best one act in Ireland in 1999 and best one act in Scotland and the United Kingdom in 2001. He also wrote the screen play for the movie. He is a recipient of two New Jersey State Council on the Art Fellowships, two Geraldine R. Dodge Grants, three National Endowments for the Humanities (2000 at Rutgers U,. 1998 at Columbia U., and 1995 at The U of Vermont), the 1986 Goshen Peace Prize, a 1998 and 2000 Finalist in the Eugene O'Neill National Playwriting Conference, and a 2007-2009 James Madison Grant at Princeton University. He is listed in Contemporary Authors and in Who's Who in America.

== Works ==
Jannuzzi's first play in New York was A Bench At The Edge, staged at St Clement Theatre in May 1981, followed by The Barbarians Are Coming staged at the Double Image Theatre in May 1983. Bench won the Samuel French short play competition, Barbarians won the 1986 Goshen Peace Prize and both were subsequently published. The Appointment produced by Love Creek Productions at the Nat Horne Theatre in December 1994 also won the Samuel French short play competition as did With Or Without You, produced by Love Creek Productions at the Harold Clurman Theatre in May 1996 and are published by Samuel French.

Night Of The Foolish Moon premiered in 1998, was a Eugene O'Neill Playwrighting Conference Finalist and is published by Samuel French as was "For The Love Of Juliet," also a finalist in the O'Neill National Theatre Conference and at Florida's Orlando Shakespeare Festival.

Exhibit This! The Museum Comedies, a collection of one acts and monologues about The Metropolitan Museum of Art that comes to life one night, was produced by the Metropolitan Theatre Company at the Midtown International Festival, NYC in July 2007 winning for outstanding production, was the number one pick by New York Magazine in their July 16, 2007 issue of New York Magazine and received positive reviews from the New York Theatre Critics. It also won the Perry Award for Best Original Comedy. It is published by Samuel French.

All The King's Women, a collection of one acts and monologues about the life of Elvis Presley, was produced by the Metropolitan Theatre Company at the Midtown International Festival, NYC in July 2007 received positive reviews from the New York Critics and is published by Samuel French.
