= Dunellen Public Schools =

School district in Middlesex County, New Jersey, US

Coordinates: 40.58296°N 74.467019°W

Address
- 400 High Street Dunellen, Middlesex County, New Jersey, 08812; United States

District information
- Grades: PreK-12
- Superintendent: Daniel J. Ross
- Business administrator: Richard Pepe
- Schools: 3

Students and staff
- Enrollment: 1,238 (as of 2020–21)
- Faculty: 112.0 FTEs
- Student–teacher ratio: 11.1:1

Other information
- District Factor Group: FG
- Website: www.dunellenschools.org
Ind.	Per pupil	District spending	Rank (*)	K-12 average	%± vs. average
1A	Total Spending	$15,418	6	$18,891	−18.4%
1	Budgetary Cost	11,457	3	14,783	−22.5%
2	Classroom Instruction	6,703	3	8,763	−23.5%
6	Support Services	1,563	5	2,392	−34.7%
8	Administrative Cost	1,586	22	1,485	6.8%
10	Operations & Maintenance	1,207	6	1,783	−32.3%
13	Extracurricular Activities	395	18	268	47.4%
16	Median Teacher Salary	51,759	4	64,043
Data from NJDoE 2014 Taxpayers' Guide to Education Spending. *Of K-12 districts with up to 1,800 students. Lowest spending=1; Highest=49

Dunellen Public Schools is a comprehensive community public school district that serves students in pre-kindergarten through twelfth grade from Dunellen, in Middlesex County, in the U.S. state of New Jersey.

As of the 2020–21 school year, the district, comprising three schools, had an enrollment of 1,238 students and 112.0 classroom teachers (on an FTE basis), for a student–teacher ratio of 11.1:1.

The district is classified by the New Jersey Department of Education as being in District Factor Group "FG", the fourth-highest of eight groupings. District Factor Groups organize districts statewide to allow comparison by common socioeconomic characteristics of the local districts. From lowest socioeconomic status to highest, the categories are A, B, CD, DE, FG, GH, I and J.

== Awards and recognition ==
Lincoln Middle School was recognized by Governor Jim McGreevey in 2003 as one of 25 schools selected statewide for the First Annual Governor's School of Excellence award.

== Schools ==
Schools in the district (with 2020–21 enrollment data from the National Center for Education Statistics) are:

Elementary school

- John P. Faber School with 591 students in grades PreK-5
  - Brendan Tennant, principal

Middle school

- Lincoln Middle School with 246 students in grades 6-8
  - Robert Altmire, principal

High school

- Dunellen High School with 372 students in grades 9-12
  - Paul Lynch, principal

== Administration ==
Core members of the district's administration are:

- Daniel J. Ross, superintendent
- Richard Pepe, business administrator and board secretary

== Board of education ==
The district's board of education, composed of nine members, sets policy and oversees the fiscal and educational operation of the district through its administration. As a Type II school district, the board's trustees are elected directly by voters to serve three-year terms of office on a staggered basis, with three seats up for election each year held (since 2012) as part of the November general election. The board appoints a superintendent to oversee the district's day-to-day operations and a business administrator to supervise the business functions of the district.
