= East Brunswick Magnet School =

High school in Middlesex County, New Jersey, US

Location
- 112 Rues Lane; East Brunswick, Middlesex County, New Jersey 08816; United States
- 40°25′18″N 74°23′07″W

Information
- Type: Magnet Public high school
- Established: 1970
- School district: Middlesex County Magnet Schools
- NCES School ID: 341008003420
- Principal: Michael Cappiello
- Faculty: 66.5 FTEs
- Enrollment: 745 (as of 2024–25)
- Student to teacher ratio: 11.2:1
- Colors: Black and Orange
- Team name: Tigers
- Website: ebms.mcmsnj.net

East Brunswick Magnet School (also known as MCVTS at East Brunswick, East Brunswick Tech, EB Tech, EBVT and East Brunswick Vo-Tech) is a four-year career academy and college preparatory magnet public high school serving students in ninth through twelfth grades located in East Brunswick in Middlesex County, in the U.S. state of New Jersey, operating as part of the Middlesex County Magnet Schools. The school specializes in CTE education, with the inclusion of multiple shops relating to specific trade or arts majors. As Middlesex County is a notably diverse county, East Brunswick Magnet serves students of many different cultures.

As of the 2024–25 school year, the school had an enrollment of 745 students and 66.5 classroom teachers (on an FTE basis), for a student–teacher ratio of 11.2:1. There were 196 students (26.3% of enrollment) eligible for free lunch and 76 (10.2% of students) eligible for reduced-cost lunch.

== History ==
The school opened for the 1970–71 school year, offering vocational training programs in 18 trades. It was the district's second facility after Perth Amboy Magnet School, which was established in 1914.

== Athletics ==
The East Brunswick Tech Tigers compete in the Greater Middlesex Conference, which is comprised of public and private high schools in the Middlesex County area, and operates under the supervision of the New Jersey State Interscholastic Athletic Association (NJSIAA). With 555 students in grades 10-12, the school was classified by the NJSIAA for the 2019–20 school year as Group II for most athletic competition purposes, which included schools with an enrollment of 486 to 758 students in that grade range.

The school colors are orange, black, and white. In the fall, the school offers soccer and cross country. There is boys' basketball, girls' basketball, and cheerleading in the winter. In addition to varsity and junior varsity teams for cheerleading, there is a separate team that participates in competition cheer around the state. In the spring, the school offers softball and baseball.

== Clubs ==
In addition to sports, the school offers several clubs, including:

- Anime Club
- Class Committee
- DECA
- Dungeons & Dragons Club
- FFA
- National Technical Honor Society
- Gender and Sexual Minorities and Allies (GSMA)
- Guitar Club
- HOSA
- Skills USA
- Student Council
- Stripes Literary Magazine
- Thespian Society
- TSA
- Yearbook Committee

== Shops ==
East Brunswick Tech offers a variety of shops, but is most notable for their School of the Arts programs, which include:

- Graphic Design/Commercial Art
- Theatre
- Digital Filmmaking
- Multimedia Art
- Dance
- Arts Technology (non-audition)
- Music Performance and Technology

Other shops include:

- Automotive Technology
- Machine Tool Technology
- Computer Architectural Design
- Heating, Ventilation, Air Conditioning & Refrigeration Technology
- Agriscience Technology
- Baking
- Cosmetology and Hairstyling
- Pre-Engineering

In addition to the regular programs, there is a special-needs program, which has options in:

- Automotive Services
- Basic Business Technology
- Building Services/Maintenance Mechanics
- Building Trades/Carpentry
- Culinary Arts
- Dry Cleaning
- Health Services
- Heating, Ventilation, and Air Conditioning

== School of the Arts ==
The School of the Arts puts on several productions throughout the year, specifically:

- Senior Showcase, a collaboration between all seven arts shops (November)
- Full-production winter Dance show, in collaboration with Arts Technology (December)
- Choreography showcase, featuring a number of student-created short dance pieces (February)
- Main stage theatre production, generally alternating between Shakespearean and contemporary plays, collaboration with Arts Technology (March/April)
- Reel Film Festival (May)
- Spring dance concert, a series of mid-length pieces (May)
- Freshman Showcase, a series of short plays showcasing the freshmen from Theatre and Arts Technology (May)

Other shows may be added throughout the year.

== Administration ==
The school's principal is Michael Cappiello. Core members of the school's administration include the three vice principals:

== Notable alumni ==
- Brian Sicknick (1978–2021), United States Capitol Police officer who died following the January 6 attack

== See also ==
- Middlesex County Magnet Schools
