= Joseph and Minnie White House =

Historic house in New Jersey, United States

- U.S. National Register of Historic Places
- New Jersey Register of Historic Places
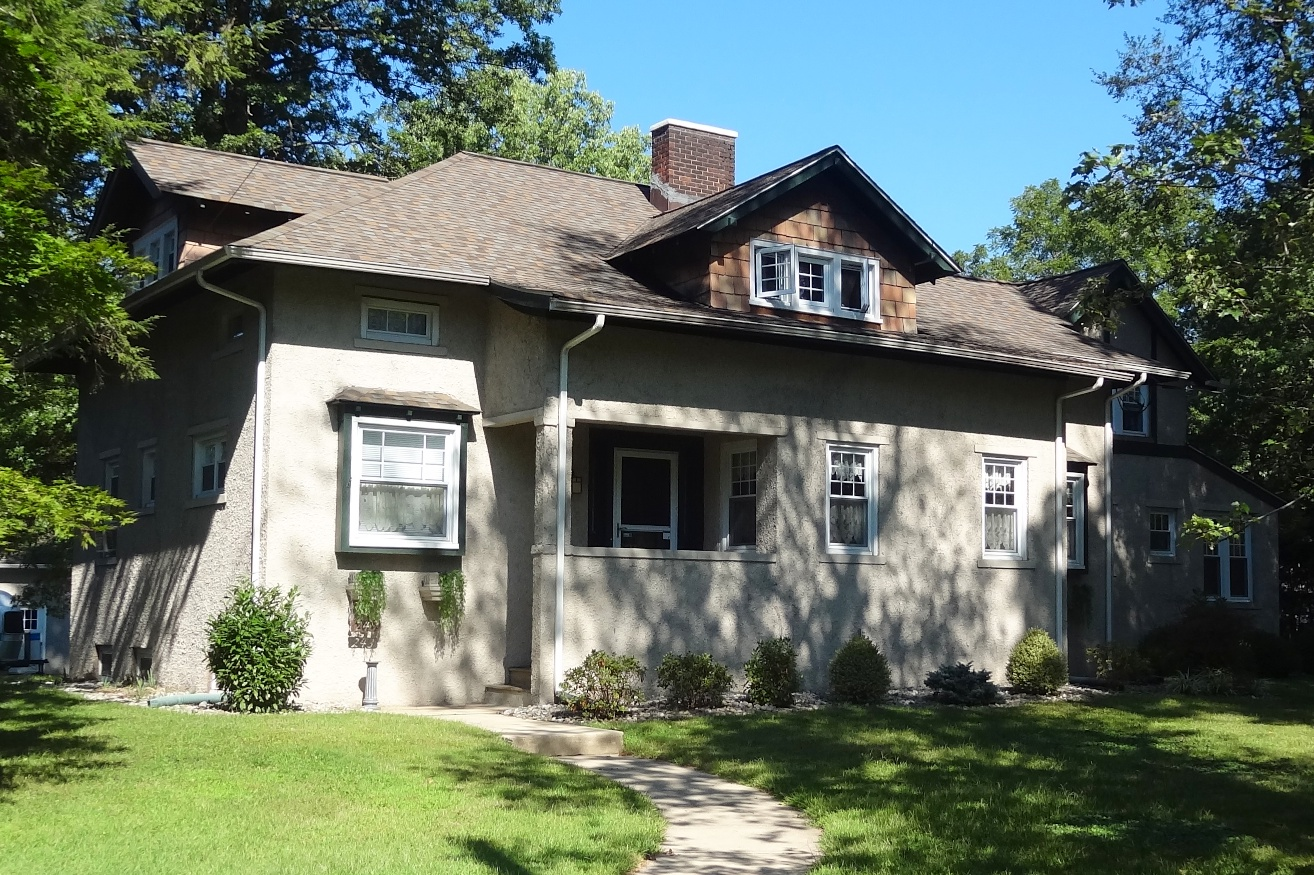

- Location within Middlesex County, New Jersey Location within New Jersey Location within the United States
- Location: 243 Hazelwood Avenue, Middlesex, New Jersey
- Coordinates: 40°34′15″N 74°31′12″W
- Built: 1905
- Architectural style: Bungalow/American Craftsman
- NRHP reference No.: 87001763
- NJRHP No.: 1847

Significant dates
- Added to NRHP: October 28, 1988
- Designated NJRHP: August 13, 1987

The Joseph and Minnie White House is a historic home at 243 Hazelwood Avenue in Middlesex, Middlesex County, New Jersey. The house was added to the National Register of Historic Places on October 28, 1988, for its significance in architecture and photojournalism as the childhood home of Margaret Bourke-White. It was built in 1905 with American Craftsman style.

== History and description ==
The stuccoed two-story house was built with concrete block in 1905 by Joseph White. It features exposed timbers to add geometric patterns to the exterior. The house was designed in the Craftsman style of Gustav Stickley. Janet Foster states in the nomination form that the house: "possesses integrity of location, design, setting, materials, workmanship, feeling, and association, and is associated with the lives of persons significant in our past; and embodies the distinctive characteristics of a type, period, or method of construction."

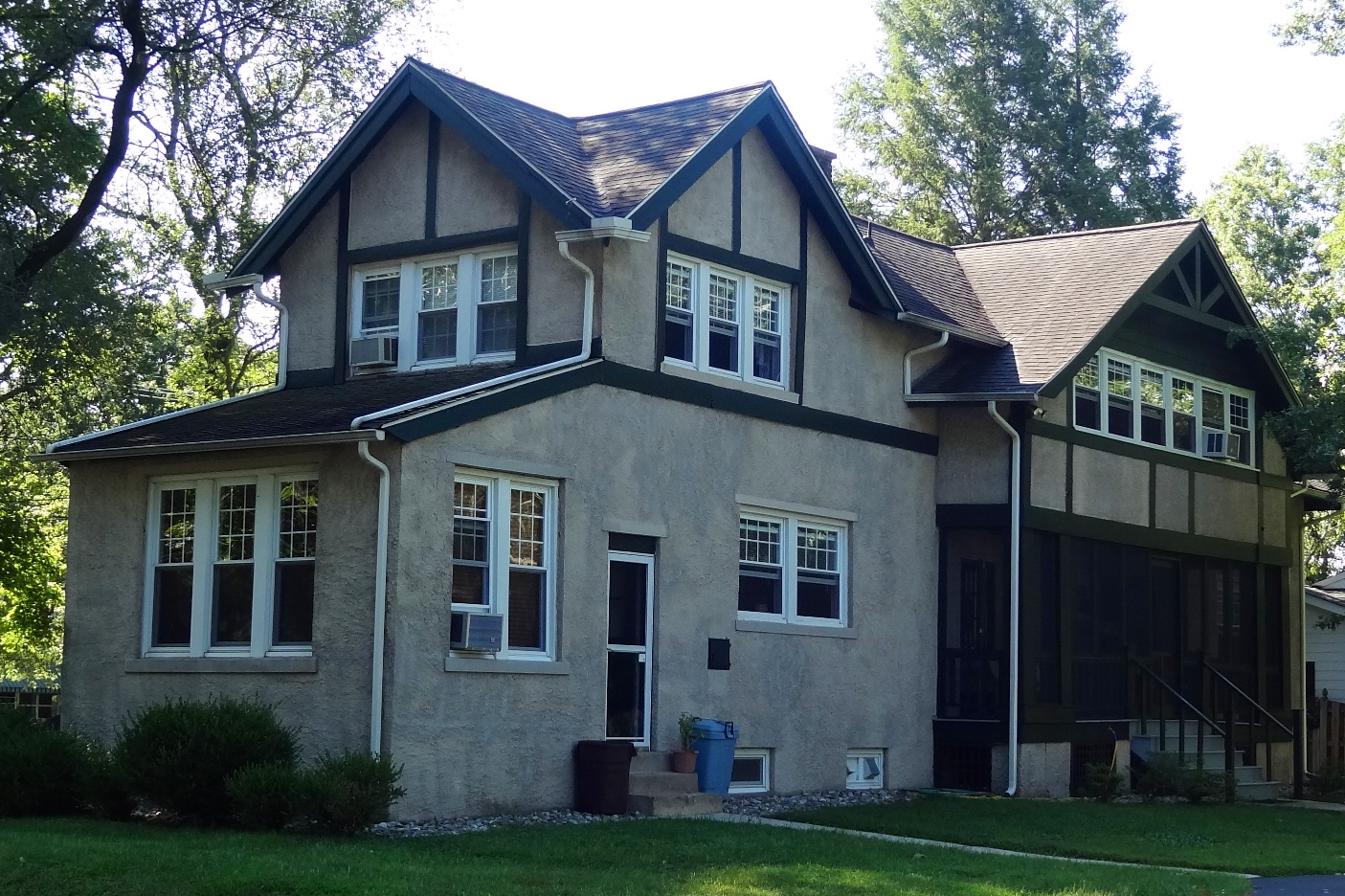
Rear view

== See also ==
- National Register of Historic Places listings in Middlesex County, New Jersey
