= Edison Academy Magnet School =

Magnet high school in Middlesex County, New Jersey, US

Location
- 100 Technology Drive; Edison, Middlesex County, New Jersey 08837; United States; 40.5045°N 74.3697°W

Information
- Former name: Middlesex County Academy for Science, Mathematics and Engineering Technologies
- Type: Magnet public high school
- Established: 2000
- School district: Middlesex County Magnet Schools
- CEEB code: 310309
- NCES School ID: 341008000395
- Principal: Amro Mosaad
- Faculty: 12.5 FTEs
- Enrollment: 173 (as of 2024–25)
- Student to teacher ratio: 13.8:1
- Colors: Black and gold
- Team name: Eagles
- Website: eams.mcmsnj.net

The Edison Academy Magnet School (formerly known as the Middlesex County Academy for Science, Mathematics and Engineering Technologies) is a four-year career academy and college preparatory magnet public high school located on the campus of the Middlesex County College in Edison, in Middlesex County, in the U.S. state of New Jersey.

As of the 2024–25 school year, the school had an enrollment of 173 students and 12.5 classroom teachers (on an FTE basis), for a student–teacher ratio of 13.8:1. There were 0 students (0.0% of enrollment) eligible for free lunch and 3 (1.7% of students) eligible for reduced-cost lunch.

== Awards, recognition and rankings ==
In September 2013, the academy was one of 15 schools in New Jersey to be recognized by the United States Department of Education as part of the National Blue Ribbon Schools Program, an award called the "most prestigious honor in the United States' education system" and which Education Secretary Arne Duncan described as schools that "represent examples of educational excellence".

Schooldigger.com ranked the school as one of 16 schools tied for first out of 381 public high schools statewide in its 2011 rankings (unchanged from the 2010 ranking) which were based on the combined percentage of students classified as proficient or above proficient on the language arts literacy (100.0%) and mathematics (100.0%) components of the High School Proficiency Assessment (HSPA).

In its listing of "America's Best High Schools 2016", the school was ranked 10th out of 500 best high schools in the country; it was ranked third among all high schools in New Jersey.

== Engineering majors ==
- MCE Engineering (Civil/Mechanical)

The Academy uses a hands-on approach to teaching students the skills that Civil and Mechanical engineers use in the workforce. Students design and create useful projects in addition to learning the basics of bridge design, beam design, and truss analysis.

Previous projects include building a 28-foot-long (8.5 m) bridge out of PVC, foam, and wood, a fully working hovercraft (which is currently being redesigned), and designing a name display system for the students' desks. All projects in the Civil/Mechanical class are fully documented and are written up in presentation quality binders.

- EECS Engineering (Electronic/Computer)

The Electronic Engineering Curriculum starts with procedural programming in C++ and basic analog and digital circuits and goes into C++ with object-oriented programming, the PIC microcontroller, Finite State Machines, and communication systems. The ECET program has a fully equipped electrical lab, which is used heavily throughout the four-year program.

Some of the projects in the ECET lab include a digital thermometer with Celsius and Fahrenheit, a circuit to display the user's birthday, and numerous C++ programs including basic game programming such as Space Invaders and Pong. With instructor permission, some students are allowed to use other languages and/or libraries such as QT and The Unreal Engine.

== Senior project ==
One of the most prominent features of the Academy is senior project. After three years of engineering education, the fourth year is devoted to a free-form project in which students must learn to manage from start to finish a full-scale engineering project. Teams can consist of students from either engineering major. Students must either invent a new product, or add value to an existing product. Before the project starts, students complete a full patent search, and must pick a project which is different from any existing products. Students are required to give regular progress reports and must give between five and ten presentations per quarter, including seminar presentations on topics related to their projects. Accurate Gantt chart-type progress plans must be maintained alongside a full patent-ready documentation folder including an engineering notebook which must be dated, signed, and witnessed.

- Electronic projects

Projects in the electronic engineering track must contain both a hardware and a software portion of the project. Typically, this is satisfied using a PIC microcontroller or other similar device programmed in assembly code.

Projects in the Electronic track have included a hydrogen fuel cell powered R/C car, an automatic door lock, a self-regulating awning, a chair with built-in rumble/surround sound, automatic coupon calculator, a USB Morse Code keyboard, an automatically adjusting light dimmer, a robotic spider, a room-mapping device, a season pass system for amusement parks similar to E-ZPass, a synthesized audio sequencer, and a wireless parking meter system.

- Civil/Mechanical projects

Projects in the Civil/Mechanical track must be approved by the instructor and generally contain no complex electronics. As such, projects are limited to things which can be built in the classroom using the available tooling.

Projects in the C/M track have included a hand-operated trash compactor, a new type of whiteboard eraser, a self-cleaning rake, a sorter machine, and a system for removing excess carbon monoxide from car exhaust using hemoglobin.

== Athletics ==
The Edison Academy Eagles compete in the Greater Middlesex Conference, which include public and private high schools located in the greater Middlesex County area and operates under the supervision of the New Jersey State Interscholastic Athletic Association (NJSIAA). With 119 students in grades 10-12, the school was classified by the NJSIAA for the 2019–20 school year as Group I for most athletic competition purposes, which included schools with an enrollment of 75 to 476 students in that grade range.

The Academy introduced its first varsity and junior varsity team in the sport of soccer in the 2003 season. The Eagles finished the season in second place in the Gold Division of the Greater Middlesex Conference with a 7-2-1 record in the 2009 regular season. They have been led by Coach Kathy McNulty since their inaugural year and have an overall record of 55-54-2 (.495 winning percentage) and 45-23-2 (.643) in division record since the Eagles joined the Gold Division in 2004. After finishing 2nd in the GMC Gold Division for the previous three years, the Academy Eagles for the 2007 Fall season were the Greater Middlesex County Conference Gold Division Champions.

== Administration ==
The school's principal is Amro Mosaad. His administration team includes the assistant principal.
