= Middlesex County Magnet Schools =

Magnet school district in New Jersey

Address
- 112 Rues Lane East Brunswick, Middlesex County, New Jersey, 08816; United States
- Coordinates: 40.420225°N 74.384426°W

District information
- Grades: Magnet
- Established: 1914
- Superintendent: Jorge E. Diaz
- Business administrator: Karl J. Knehr
- Schools: 5

Students and staff
- Enrollment: 2,107 (as of 2023–24)
- Faculty: 183.0 FTEs
- Student–teacher ratio: 11.5:1

Other information
- District Factor Group: NA
- Website: www.mcmsnj.net
Ind.	Per pupil	District spending	Rank (*)	Vocational average	%± vs. average
1A	Total Spending	$23,934	14	$18,891	26.7%
1	Budgetary Cost	19,799	16	17,296	14.5%
2	Classroom Instruction	9,205	13	9,045	1.8%
6	Support Services	2,585	16	2,269	13.9%
8	Administrative Cost	3,433	17	2,353	45.9%
10	Operations & Maintenance	4,005	17	3,014	32.9%
13	Extracurricular Activities	366	10	464	−21.1%
16	Median Teacher Salary	65,201	16	65,035
Data from NJDoE 2014 Taxpayers' Guide to Education Spending. *Of Vocational districts with any number of students. Lowest spending=1; Highest=21

The Middlesex County Magnet Schools, formerly known as the Middlesex County Vocational and Technical Schools, is a public school district that provides a network of high schools serving the vocational and technical education needs of students in Middlesex County, in the U.S. state of New Jersey. Dating to 1914, the district was the first county vocational school system in the United States. The district serves high school, adult and disabled students.

As of the 2023–24 school year, the district, comprised of five schools, had an enrollment of 2,107 students and 183.0 classroom teachers (on an FTE basis), for a student–teacher ratio of 11.5:1.

The high school campuses in the district are located in East Brunswick, Edison, Perth Amboy, Piscataway and Woodbridge Township.

== Awards and recognition ==
Middlesex County Academy for Allied Health and Biomedical Sciences in Woodbridge was one of 11 in the state to be recognized in 2014 by the United States Department of Education's National Blue Ribbon Schools Program.

Perth Amboy Technical High School was recognized by the National Blue Ribbon Schools Program in 2012, one of 17 schools in New Jersey to be honored that year.

In 2024, Woodbridge Academy Magnet School was one of 11 schools in the state recognized by the National Blue Ribbon Schools Program as an Exemplary High Performing School.

== Schools ==
Schools in the district (with 2023–24 enrollment data from the National Center for Education Statistics) are:

- East Brunswick Magnet School with 742 students in grades 9–12
- Edison Academy Magnet School with 175 students in grades 9–12
- Perth Amboy Magnet School with 262 students in grades 9–12
- Piscataway Magnet School with 640 students in grades 9–12
- Woodbridge Academy Magnet School with 285 students in grades 9–12

== Career majors ==
A description of each career major can be found on the MCMS website.

=== Edison Academy ===
- Civil/Mechanical Engineering Technology
- Electrical/Computer Engineering Technology

=== East Brunswick ===
- Commercial Art/Marketing Design
- Graphic Arts
- Automotive Technology
- Machine Tool Technology
- Welding
- Architectural Drafting/CAD
- Carpentry
- Heating Ventilation Air Conditioning and Refrigeration (HVAC)
- Performing Arts Theatre
- Performing Arts Dance
- Music Performance & Technology
- Agriscience Technology
- Baking
- Culinary Arts
- Cosmetology/Hairstyling
- Health Technology
- Automotive Services
- Basic Business Technology
- Building Services/Maintenance Mechanics
- Building Trades
- Dry Cleaning
- Food Services
- Health Services
- Masonry
- Retail Sales

=== Perth Amboy ===
- Auto Mechanics
- Computer Applications for Business
- Graphic Design
- Carpentry
- Electrical Technology
- Heating, Ventilation, Air Conditioning and Refrigeration
- Culinary Arts

=== Piscataway ===
- Computer Assisted Drafting
- Machine Tool Technology
- Automated Office Technology
- Computer Applications for Business
- Computer Systems Technology
- Automotive Collision Repair Technology
- Auto Mechanics
- Baking
- Culinary Arts: Commercial Foods
- Cosmetology/Hairstyling
- Apparel Services/Clothes Processing
- Auto Maintenance
- Auto Repair
- Basic Business Technology
- Building Trades
- Carpentry
- Culinary Arts: Career Development
- Hospitality: Hotel Services
- Landscaping/Horticulture
- Health Technology
- Production Welding
- Sales Occupations
- Supermarket Careers

=== Woodbridge Academy ===
- Biomedical Sciences
- Allied Health
- Computer Applications for Business/Health Careers
- Building Maintenance
- Industrial Processing/Machine Trades

== Administration ==
Core members of the district's administration are:

- Jorge E. Diaz, superintendent
- Karl J. Knehr, business administrator and board secretary

== Board of education ==
The board of education is comprised of the county superintendent of schools and four members appointed by the Board of County Commissioners. The board appoints a superintendent to oversee the district's day-to-day operations and a business administrator to supervise the business functions of the district.
