= Woodbridge Academy Magnet School =

Vocational high school in Middlesex County, New Jersey, US

Location
- 1 Convery Boulevard; Woodbridge Township, New Jersey 07095; United States
- Coordinates: 40.5045°N 74.3697°W

Information
- Type: Magnet Public high school
- School district: Middlesex County Vocational and Technical Schools
- Category: Middlesex County
- NCES School ID: 341008003428
- Principal: Robert Fuller
- Faculty: 21.0 FTEs
- Enrollment: 285 (as of 2023–24)
- Student to teacher ratio: 13.6:1
- Colors: Royal blue and white
- Team name: Hornets
- Newspaper: The Buzz
- Website: wams.mcmsnj.net

The Woodbridge Academy Magnet School, formerly known as the Middlesex County Academy for Allied Health and Biomedical Sciences, is a four-year career academy and college preparatory magnet public high school located in Woodbridge Township in Middlesex County, in the U.S. state of New Jersey, serving students in ninth through twelfth grades as part of the Middlesex County Magnet Schools, which serves students of many diverse cultures from all over Middlesex County. While enrolled in this high school student can receive college credits for classes based in allied health and biomedical sciences through Rutgers University–Newark.

As of the 2023–24 school year, the school had an enrollment of 285 students and 21.0 classroom teachers (on an FTE basis), for a student–teacher ratio of 13.6:1. There were 7 students (2.5% of enrollment) eligible for free lunch and 3 (1.1% of students) eligible for reduced-cost lunch.

== Awards, recognition and rankings ==
The school was one of 11 in the state to be recognized in 2014 by the United States Department of Education's National Blue Ribbon Schools Program. In 2024, the school was one of 11 schools in the state recognized by the National Blue Ribbon Schools Program as an Exemplary High Performing School.

In its listing of "America's Best High Schools 2016", the school was ranked 31st out of 500 best high schools in the country; it was ranked 11th among all high schools in New Jersey.

Schooldigger.com ranked the school as one of 16 schools tied for first out of 381 public high schools statewide in its 2011 rankings (an increase of 256 positions from the 2010 ranking), which were based on the combined percentage of students classified as proficient or above proficient on the language arts literacy (100.0%) and mathematics (100.0%) components of the High School Proficiency Assessment (HSPA).

Woodbridge Academy was ranked 9th among the best schools in New Jersey by U.S. News & World Report.

== Curriculum ==
The major subjects of studies for four years are the following:

- English: World Literature*, US Literature I*, AP English Language and Composition*, AP English Literature and Composition*
- Mathematics: Geometry*, Algebra II*, Pre-Calculus*, Statistics, AP Calculus**
- Sciences: Biology*, Chemistry*, Physics*, AP Environmental Science
- Social Science: World History*, US History I*, AP US History*, Sociology*, Economics*
- Health and Physical Education: All four years*
- World Language: Spanish I*, Spanish II*, Spanish III*, Spanish IV**, AP Spanish**
- Rutgers SHP Courses: Introduction to Allied Health*, Dynamics of Health Care In Society*, Medical Terminology*, Anatomy and Physiology I & II*
- PLTW (Project Lead The Way) Courses: Principles of Biomedical Sciences*, Medical Interventions*, Biomedical Innovations*

- * Required Courses

- ** Must be selected to take course

== Athletics ==
The Woodbridge Academy Hornets compete in the Greater Middlesex Conference, which operates under the supervision of the New Jersey State Interscholastic Athletic Association (NJSIAA). With 206 students in grades 10-12, the school was classified by the NJSIAA for the 2019–20 school year as Group I for most athletic competition purposes, which included schools with an enrollment of 75 to 476 students in that grade range.

== Extracurricular activities ==
Due to the Academy's small size, clubs in school are generally limited, though some are more active than others. A list of clubs include:

- Key Club
- Amnesty International Chapter
- HOSA
- Interact Club
- Ethics/Debate Club
- Music Club
- Newspaper Club
- Sports Club
- Dance Club
- Yearbook Club
- Art Club
- Science League
- Math League
- UNICEF
- GSA
- Junior State of America
- Model United Nations
- Drama Club
- Culture and Diversity Club

== Science League ==
The school ranks consistently high on the Science League exams.

2014-2015 School Year Rankings

- Biology I Ranking: 4 out of 134
- Chemistry I Ranking: 7 out of 140
- Physics I Ranking: 13 out of 108

2011-2012 School Year Rankings

- Biology Ranking: 10 out of 143
- Chemistry Ranking: 19 out of 143
- Physics Ranking: 21 out of 143

== Administration ==
The school's principal is Robert Fuller. His administration team includes the assistant principal.
