= Perth Amboy Magnet School =

Vocational high school in Middlesex County, New Jersey, US

Location
- 457 High Street; Perth Amboy, Middlesex County, New Jersey 08861; United States
- 40.513715°N 74.262670°W

Information
- Type: Magnet public high school
- Established: 1916
- School district: Middlesex County Magnet Schools
- NCES School ID: 341008003424
- Principal: Brian Bilal
- Faculty: 23.0 FTEs
- Enrollment: 262 (as of 2023–24)
- Student to teacher ratio: 11.4:1
- Colors: Blue and white
- Athletics conference: Greater Middlesex Conference
- Team name: Patriots
- Website: pams.mcmsnj.net

Perth Amboy Technical High School (also known as MCVTS at Perth Amboy, Perth Amboy Tech and Perth Amboy Campus) is a four-year career academy and college preparatory magnet public high school for students in ninth through twelfth grades located in Perth Amboy in Middlesex County, in the U.S. state of New Jersey, operating as part of the Middlesex County Magnet Schools. The school serves students from all of Middlesex County.

As of the 2023–24 school year, the school had an enrollment of 262 students and 23.0 classroom teachers (on an FTE basis), for a student–teacher ratio of 11.4:1. There were 86 students (32.8% of enrollment) eligible for free lunch and 51 (19.5% of students) eligible for reduced-cost lunch.

== History ==
The Board of Education for Vocational Schools in the County of Middlesex (since renamed as the Middlesex County Magnet Schools) was established in 1914 as the nation's first vocational school system operated at the county level. Constructed the previous year, Middlesex County Vocational School No. 2 opened in Perth Amboy for the 1916-17 school year with 45 students and moved to a new facility on New Brunswick Avenue in 1927, in a three-story building with six shops; it had a small gym and a parking lot that could only accommodate staff. Shops were intended to help students get jobs and enter the workforce after graduation.

In the earlier years most classes were segregated and were gender specific. Eventually shops became integrated. In the last year of the second building the shops were Machine Technology, Auto Mechanics, Computer Assisted Business, Computer Assisted Drafting and Design, HVAC, Carpentry, Electrical Trade and a day would have 8 periods. The sports involved Soccer, Basketball and Softball, respectively each had Varsity and Junior Varsity and girls didn't participate in sports. The school at one point held over 400 students and eventually needed to be expanded in order to accommodate more.

In Summer/Fall 2002 construction of the new building started and it opened in spring of 2004. The new school allowed girls' programs for basketball, softball and co-ed soccer. The new building allowed expanded programs in the school and Middlesex County College is also located in the facility.

=== New campus ===
The new Perth Amboy Magnet School, on High Street is a 124,000-square-foot (11,500 m^{2}) building, constructed at a cost of $28 million. It replaces the 76-year-old building on New Brunswick Avenue. The school houses up to 250 high school students. In the evenings there's an average of about 100 adults students and 250 part-time college students in the building.

The school offers special classes or 'shops' to students with an interest in learning a new skill. Some of the shops consist of carpentry, electrical trades, and heating, ventilation and air conditioning (HVAC). This area is considered the School of Construction and Technology. Each area is like a major at a college.

The second area is the School of Computer and Business technology. This area of study in the school includes computer applications, computer assisted drafting and computer systems technology. Students obtain the benefit to learn how to work in a busy office environment in preparation to obtain their certification in their respected field.

The last area is the School of Professional Services. The two remaining shops to conclude this series are auto mechanics technology and culinary arts. Here the students will learn the maintenance and basic repair of vehicles and grow accustomed to the work space of a busy restaurant environment.

To expand on the uses of the building aside from providing shops, there is the inclusion of a wellness center, media center, athletic fields, and a gymnasium. The building also includes computer rooms in between classrooms to provide students with easy access to the internet in case of class activities or research. The remaining sqft of the building, will be utilized for Middlesex County College.

Having both the high school and college share the same building enables students to see life after graduation. It allows easy access to the college and gives them a firsthand experience as to how they should go about as to managing their college necessities.

== Awards and recognition ==
The school was recognized by the National Blue Ribbon Schools Program in 2012, one of 17 schools in New Jersey to be honored that year.

== Demographics and statistics ==
The enrollment of PAVTS consists of 58% male and 42% female students. Of those enrolled 27.1% are 9th graders, 25.8% are 10th graders, 24.4% are 11th graders, and 22.7% are 12th graders. PAVTS is a very diverse school having 52.2% Hispanics, 36.4% Caucasian/White, 10% African American, and 1.3% Asian. The schools proficiency levels of math is 57% and English is at a high of 92%.

According to past yearbooks, girls started attending the old Perth Amboy campus around the years 1974-1975. According to Principal Robert Fuller, over the past 11 years the dropout rate for the new Perth Amboy campus was a steady 0% due to the fact that students who left this campus returned to their district school and graduated. Over the past 7 years of this campus, the graduation rate was at 100% but over the years it slowly went down to 95-98% because many students went to their district but never reported with their state ID.

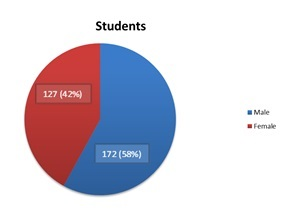
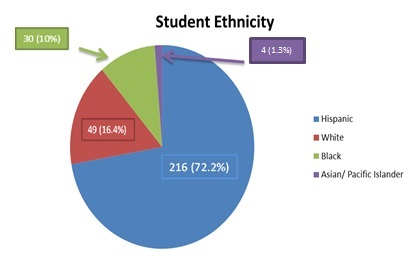
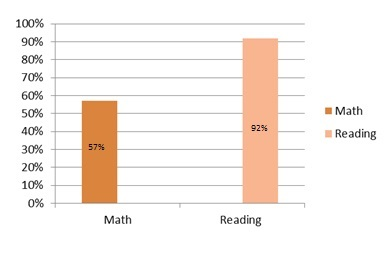

== Shops ==
Perth Amboy Tech offers courses in the following industrial arts:

- Auto Mechanics
- Carpentry
- Graphic Design
- Culinary Arts
- Computer Systems Technology (CST)
- Electrical Engineering Technology
- Heating Ventilating and Air Conditioning (HVAC)

== Athletics ==
The Perth Amboy Tech Patriots compete in the Greater Middlesex Conference, which operates under the supervision of the New Jersey State Interscholastic Athletic Association (NJSIAA). With 212 students in grades 10-12, the school was classified by the NJSIAA for the 2019–20 school year as Group I for most athletic competition purposes, which included schools with an enrollment of 75 to 476 students in that grade range.

School colors are blue and white. Interscholastic sports offered by the school are baseball (men), basketball (men and women), soccer (men) and softball (women).

- 1992 boys' basketball GMC/NJTAC state champions
- 1992 boys' basketball GMC champions
- 1993 boys' basketball GMC/NJSIAA Central Jersey Group I state champions
- 1993 boys' basketball NJSIAA Group I state champions (with a 42-33 win vs. Cresskill High School)
- 1993 boys' basketball NJTAC champions
- 1996 boys' baseball NJTAC champions
- 1996 boys' basketball GMC champions
- 2005 boys' basketball GMC champions
- 2006 soccer GMC champions
- 2015 boys' basketball GMC Gold Division champions

== Administration ==
The school's principal is Brian Bilal. His administration team includes the assistant principal.
