= Piscataway Magnet School =

High school in Middlesex County, New Jersey, US

Location
- 21 Suttons Lane; Piscataway, Middlesex County, New Jersey 08854; United States
- Coordinates: 40.524188°N 74.429045°W

Information
- Type: Magnet Public high school
- School district: Middlesex County Magnet Schools
- NCES School ID: 341008003426
- Principal: Nicole Slade
- Faculty: 64.0 FTEs
- Enrollment: 640 (as of 2023–24)
- Student to teacher ratio: 10.0:1
- Colors: Hunter green and gold
- Athletics conference: Greater Middlesex Conference
- Team name: Raiders
- Website: pms.mcmsnj.net

Piscataway Magnet School (also known as MCVTS at Piscataway, Piscataway Tech, and Piscataway Campus) is a four-year career academy and college preparatory magnet public high school located in Piscataway in Middlesex County, in the U.S. state of New Jersey, that serves students in ninth through twelfth grades of many diverse cultures from all over Middlesex County as part of the Middlesex County Magnet Schools.

As of the 2023–24 school year, the school had an enrollment of 640 students and 64.0 classroom teachers (on an FTE basis), for a student–teacher ratio of 10.0:1. There were 177 students (27.7% of enrollment) eligible for free lunch and 85 (13.3% of students) eligible for reduced-cost lunch.

== Athletics ==
The Piscataway Tech Raiders compete in the Greater Middlesex Conference, which is comprised of public and private schools in and around Middlesex County and operates under the supervision of the New Jersey State Interscholastic Athletic Association (NJSIAA). With 486 students in grades 10–12, the school was classified by the NJSIAA for the 2019–20 school year as Group II for most athletic competition purposes, which included schools with an enrollment of 486 to 758 students in that grade range.

School colors are hunter green and gold. Interscholastic sports offered by the school are baseball (men), basketball (men and women), soccer (men) and softball (women).

== Administration ==
The school's principal is Nicole Slade. Her core administration team includes the three assistant principals.
