= List of watermills in the United States =

A list of watermills in the United States.

== Working mills ==
Alabama

- Chandlers Mill, 45ft working water wheel & Gristmill, built 1860 Centre, Alabama
- Kymulga Mill, Childersburg

Arkansas

- War Eagle Mill, Rogers, built 1832 and still in operation commercially as an undershot grist mill

California

- Bale Grist Mill, Napa

Connecticut

- Main Sawmill, Ledyard, Connecticut
- Winthrop Mill, New London, Connecticut, built circa 1650

Georgia

- Historic mills of the Atlanta area
- Old Mill at Berry College, Rome
- Nora Mill at Helen, Georgia

Illinois

- Franklin Creek Grist Mill, Franklin Creek State Natural Area, Franklin Grove, Illinois
- Graue Mill and Museum, Oak Brook

Indiana

- Beck's Mill, Becks Mill
- Bonneyville Mill, Bristol. Built mid-1830s and still operates May through October (see Elkhart County Parks and Recreation)
- Mansfield Roller Mill, Mansfield. Built in 1820. Currently operated by Indiana DNR.
- Metamora Grist Mill, Metamora. Built in 1899 and restored in 1970. Produces high quality stone-ground corn meal.
- Spring Mill State Park, Mitchell
- Stockdale Mill, Roann
- Bridgeton Mill, Bridgeton. Established 1823, family owned and operating.
- Greenfield Mills, near Howe. Family owned and operating.

Iowa

- Pine Creek Gristmill, Wildcat Den State Park, near Muscatine

Kentucky

- Mill Springs Overshot Waterwheel located at Mill Springs Park. The current mill built in 1877 on the site of a previous mill. Currently owned and operated as a park by the United States Army Corps of Engineers. The wheel has a diameter of 40 feet, 10 inches, and a breast of three feet. Powered by 13 natural springs located beside the mill, it is thought to be one of the largest of its kind in the world. - Mill Springs
- Weisenberger Mill, near Midway

Maine

- Bog Mill, Buxton
- Dexter Grist Mill, Dexter, built in 1854
- Maine Forest & Logging Museum also known as Leonard's Mills, has Maine's only operational saw mill.
- Morgan's Mills in Union, Maine produces wholesale grist mill products.
- Scribner's Mills in Harrison, Maine is working on reconstructing an up-and-down sawmill.

Maryland

- Wye Mill c.1682 The oldest continuously operating grist mill in the United States. Supplied flour to George Washington's Continental Army. One of the first grist mills to be automated by Oliver Evans. The Oliver Evans process equipment is still in use at the Wye Mill.

Massachusetts

- Dexter Grist Mill, Sandwich, built in 1654, fully restored in 1961
- Jenney Grist Mill, Plymouth, built in 1969 on site of 1636 grist mill
- Old Schwamb Mill, Arlington, built in 1861 with operations on the site dating to 1684
- Old Stockbridge Grist Mill, Scituate, built ca. 1650
- Sturbridge Village grist mill, Sturbridge, built 1939
- Wayside Inn Grist Mill, Sudbury, built 1929 by Henry Ford

Michigan

- Pears Mill, Buchanan

Minnesota

- Pickwick Mill, Pickwick, built in 1858
- Schech's Mill, Caledonia, built in 1876

Mississippi

- Sciple's Water Mill in Kemper County, built in 1790 and owned by four families over the next fifty years. The Sciple family bought the property in about 1840 and has kept it running ever since. This mill also ginned cotton and sawed lumber until the 1950s.

Missouri

- Hodgson Mill, Ozark County
- Bollinger Mill, Burfordville
- Dillard Mill, Crawford County

Nebraska

- Florence Mill, Omaha

New Hampshire

- Littleton Grist Mill, Littleton
- Sanborn grist and saw mill, Loudon now known as Sanborn Farm Mills

New Jersey

- Cooper Gristmill, Chester

New York

- Mill Dam Bridge (tide mill), Centerport
- Roslyn Grist Mill, Roslyn
- Stony Brook Grist Mill, Stony Brook
- Tuthilltown Gristmill, Gardiner
- Enfield Falls Mill and Miller's House, Enfield
- Water Mill (Water Mill, New York)
- Mills at Green Hole, Philmont NY:
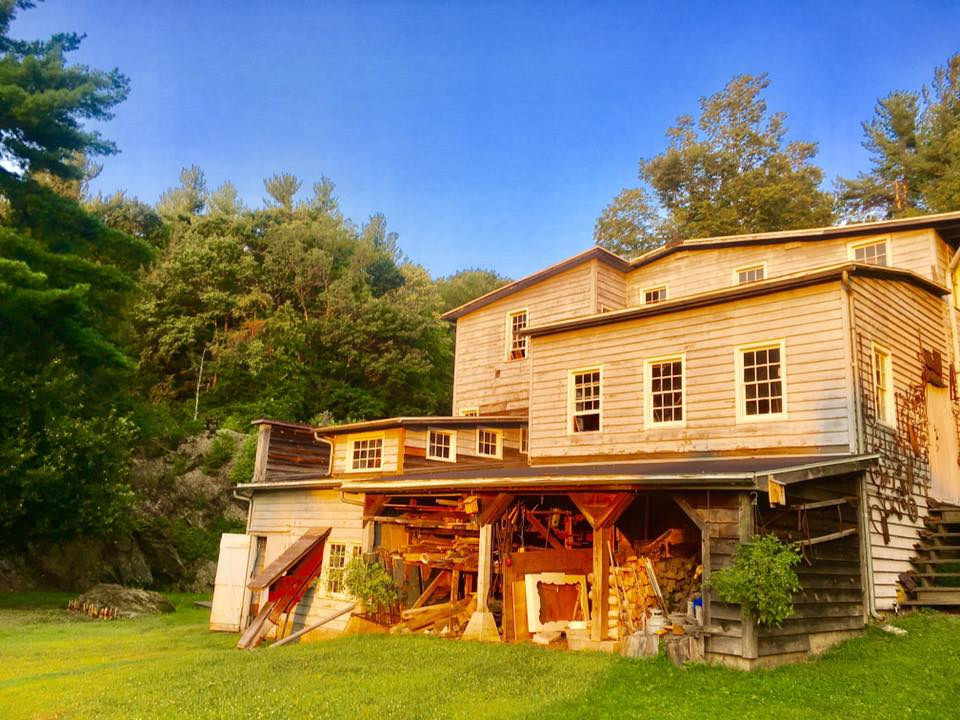
  Mills at Green Hole - Mill complex
  Early 1700s Fully operational water-powered saw mill, cider press, blacksmith shop, & woodworking shop

North Carolina

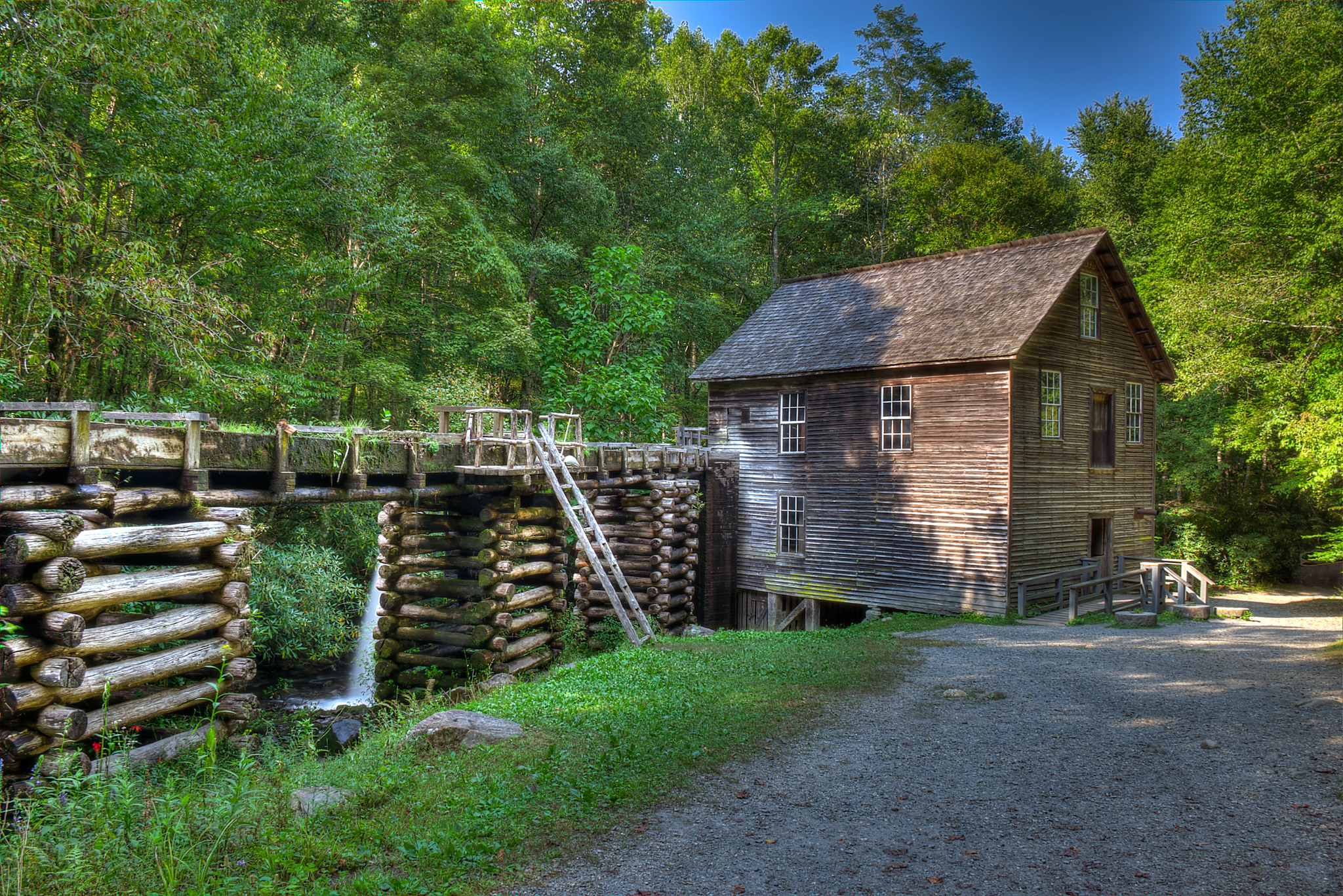
Mingus Mill

- Dellingers Mill, Bakersville, seasonally operational, water powered, 1867
- Emmett Isaacs Mill, Surry County
- Gwynn Valley Mill, Brevard
- Linneys Mill, Alexander County, 1902
- Mingus Mill, Cherokee
- Old Mill of Guilford, Oak Ridge. Fully operational water-powered grist mill. Founded in 1767, moved 500 feet downstream to current location in 1819. According to legend, Revolutionary War British troops seized the original mill prior to the Battle of Guilford Courthouse in March 1781.
- West Point Mill, Durham
- Yates Mill, Wake County

Ohio

- Lantermans Mill Youngstown, Ohio
- Bear's Mill
- Clifton Mill, Clifton, one of the oldest grist mills still in operation
- Indian Mill, Upper Sandusky

Oregon

- Thompson's Mills, Shedd, OR, 1858, on the Calapooia River, now an Oregon State Heritage Site, Thompson's Mills State Heritage Site
- Butte Creek Mill, Eagle Point, OR, 1872, Little Butte Creek

Pennsylvania

- Bohrmans Mill, near Orwigsburg
- The Mill at Anselma (Lightfoot Mill), Chester Springs
- Newlin Mill Complex, Concordville
- Ressler's Mill Mascot Roller Mills, Lancaster County, Pennsylvania
- Shoaff's Mill, Little Buffalo State Park, Perry County
- McConnell's Mill, McConnells Mill State Park, Lawrence County, Pennsylvania

Rhode Island

- Carpenter's Grist Mill, Perryville, built in 1703
- Hammond Gristmill at Gilbert Stuart Birthplace in Saunderstown, Rhode Island, built in 1757
- Kenyon's Grist Mill, West Kingston, current mill building was built in 1886, (operation founded in 1696)

South Carolina

- Boykin Mill, Boykin, an operating grist mill where meal and grits have been ground by water power for over 150 years.
- Suber's Corn Mill, Greer, built in 1908 by Walter Hillary Suber. It was constructed on 100 acres (0.40 km^{2}) that was passed down from his father, James Ashfield Suber, who was a Civil War veteran. This was one of five mills within a 10-mile (16 km) radius in the early 1900s.

Tennessee

- Cable Mill at Cades Cove, Great Smoky Mountains National Park
- Falls Mill, Belvidere
- Pigeon Forge Mill, Pigeon Forge
- Rice Grist Mill, Rocky Top, Norris Dam State Park
- Gap Creek Mill at Cumberland Gap, The Olde Mill Inn Bed & Breakfast

Virginia

- Burwell-Morgan Mill, Millwood, built in 1782–85, still grinding a variety of grains, powered by an indoor waterwheel
- Locke's Mill, Berryville, Virginia, Colonial-era grist mill on the Shenandoah River. Grinding a variety of grains including certified organic, powered by water wheel.
- McCormick Mill, Raphine, Virginia, grist mill located on the Cyrus McCormick Farm.
- Causey's Mill, Causey Mill Park, Newport News
- George Washington's Gristmill, Mount Vernon
- Kennedy-Wade Mill, Raphine
- Woodson's Mill, Lowesville

Washington

- Cedar Creek Grist Mill, Woodland

West Virginia

- Glade Creek Grist Mill in Babcock State Park, Fayette County

Wisconsin

- Beckman Mill, Newark, Wisconsin
- Cedarburg Mill, Cedarburg
- Concordia Mill, Cedarburg

== Extant non-operational mills ==
- Forbes Mill, Los Gatos, California
- Rhodes Mill, Fertile, Iowa
- Greenbank Mill, Marshallton, Delaware, restored as a museum
- Fair Haven Flour Mill, Fairhaven, Minnesota
- Phelps Mill, Underwood, Minnesota
- Pillsbury A Mill, Minneapolis, Minnesota
- Terrace Mill, Terrace, Minnesota
- el Rancho de las Golondrinas, Santa Fe, New Mexico
- Wolf Creek Grist Mill, Loudonville, Ohio
- Thomas Mill, West Whiteland Township, Pennsylvania
- Price's Mill, Parksville, South Carolina
- Box Elder Flouring Mill (1857), Brigham City, Utah
- Planing Mill of Brigham City Mercantile and Manufacturing Association (1876), Brigham City, Utah
- Causey's Mill, Newport News, Virginia
- Gish Mill, Vinton, Virginia
- Phoenix Mill (Virginia), Alexandria, Virginia
- Thorp Mill, Thorp, Washington
- Peirce Mill, Washington, D.C.
- Hilgen and Wittenberg Woolen Mill, Cedarburg, Wisconsin

== Ruined, remnant, or partially preserved gristmills ==
- Boshell's Mill, Townley, Alabama
- Gurleyville Grist Mill and Gurley-Mason Mill, Mansfield, Connecticut
- Cooch-Dayett Mills, Newark, Delaware a mill complex since the 1700s, the only remaining mill was built in 1838 by William Cooch Jr.
- Dingley's Mill, Green Valley, Fairfield, CA. 1850, in ruins now. 40 water wheel.
- Hearn's Mill, Seaford, Delaware
- Ward Spoke Mill, in ruins on Upper Pike Creek Road in Newark, Delaware
- Blantons Mill, Blanton Mill Rd. Griffin, Ga, restored as an office on the banks of the Flint River, built around the early 1800s
- Wapsipinicon Grist Mill in Independence, Iowa; owned by the Buchanan County Historical Society
- Matthews Mill, Union, ME. Built circa 1850, now an endangered local landmark
- Phoenix Mill, Plymouth, Michigan, building now offices and event space
- Archibald Mill, Dundas, Minnesota
- Marine Mill, Marine on St. Croix, Minnesota, operated 1839–1895, ruins preserved in a park
- Mill Ruins Park, Minneapolis, Minnesota
- Ramsey Mill, Hastings, Minnesota, ruins preserved in a park
- Oxford Mill Ruin, Stanton Township, Minnesota
- Falling Spring Mill, New Liberty, Missouri
- Greer Mill, Greer, Missouri slated for restoration by U.S. National Forest Service
- Montauk Mill, Salem, Missouri National Register of Historic Places, Montauk State Park
- Turner Mill, Surprise, Missouri
- Lawrence Brook Mill, Milltown, New Jersey
- Elkin Creek Mill, Elkin, North Carolina
- Emlenton Mill, Venango County, Pennsylvania destroyed by fire in 2015
- Fought's Mill, Pennsylvania
- GT Wilburn Grist Mill, Fall River, Tennessee
- Saffold Mill, Seguin Texas
- Swift Creek Mill, Chesterfield County Virginia, a circa 1663 grist mill now operated as a professional nonprofit theatre
- Audra State Park, West Virginia
- Valley Falls State Park, West Virginia
- McMullins Mill, former circa 1810? McMullan Rice Plantation mill on Rice Mill Road and Lewis St, Hartwell, Georgia

== See also ==
- Watermill
- List of watermills
- Gristmill
- List of tide mills on Long Island
