= Fairhaven =

Fairhaven or Fair Haven may refer to:

== Places ==
=== Australia ===
- Fairhaven, Victoria
- Fairhaven, an area of French Island

=== Canada ===
- Fairhaven, Saskatoon, Saskatchewan
- Fairhaven, Deer Island, New Brunswick
- Fair Haven, Newfoundland and Labrador

=== Norway ===
- Fairhaven (Svalbard)

=== United Kingdom ===
- Fairhaven, Lancashire, an area of Lytham St Annes

=== United States ===
- Fair Haven, New Haven, a neighborhood in New Haven, Connecticut
- Fair Haven, Michigan
- Fair Haven, Missouri
- Fair Haven, New Jersey
- Fair Haven, New York
- Fair Haven, Vermont
- Fair Haven (CDP), Vermont
- Fair Haven Heights, New Haven, Connecticut
- Fairhaven, Alaska
- Fairhaven, California
- Fairhaven, Kansas
- Fairhaven, Massachusetts
- Fairhaven, Anne Arundel County, Maryland
- Fairhaven, Carroll County, Maryland
- Fairhaven, Frederick County, Maryland
- Fairhaven, Minnesota
- Fairhaven, Ohio
- Fairhaven, Oregon, in Klamath County
- Fairhaven, Bellingham, Washington
- Fairhaven, West Virginia
- Fairhaven Township (disambiguation), including Fair Haven Township

== Education ==
- Fairhaven School (Upper Marlboro, Maryland), a democratic school built on the Sudbury model
- Fairhaven College, a school within Western Washington University in Bellingham, Washington
- Fairhaven Baptist College, in Chesterton, Indiana
- Fairhaven High School, in Fairhaven, Massachusetts

== Transportation ==
- Ansdell and Fairhaven railway station, in Lytham St Annes, Lancashire, United Kingdom
- Fairhaven Branch Railroad, a former short-line railroad in Massachusetts, United States
- Fairhaven Bridge Light, located on the bridge between New Bedford and Fairhaven, Massachusetts, United States
- Fairhaven Station (Amtrak), in Bellingham, Washington, United States
- Fairhaven (sternwheeler), an 1889 sternwheel steamboat of the Puget Sound Mosquito Fleet

== Other ==
- "Fair Haven" (Star Trek: Voyager), an episode of the Star Trek: Voyager television series
- Fairhaven (film), a 2012 American comedy film by Tom O'Brien
- Fair Haven (film), a 2016 independent film starring Tom Wopat
- Fairhaven, a city in the fantasy novel series The Saga of Recluce, where the February 2021 novel is titled Fairhaven Rising
- Fairhaven, Kent, a fictitious village in Richard Osman's first novel The Thursday Murder Club
