= Fair Haven Flour Mill =

- U.S. National Register of Historic Places
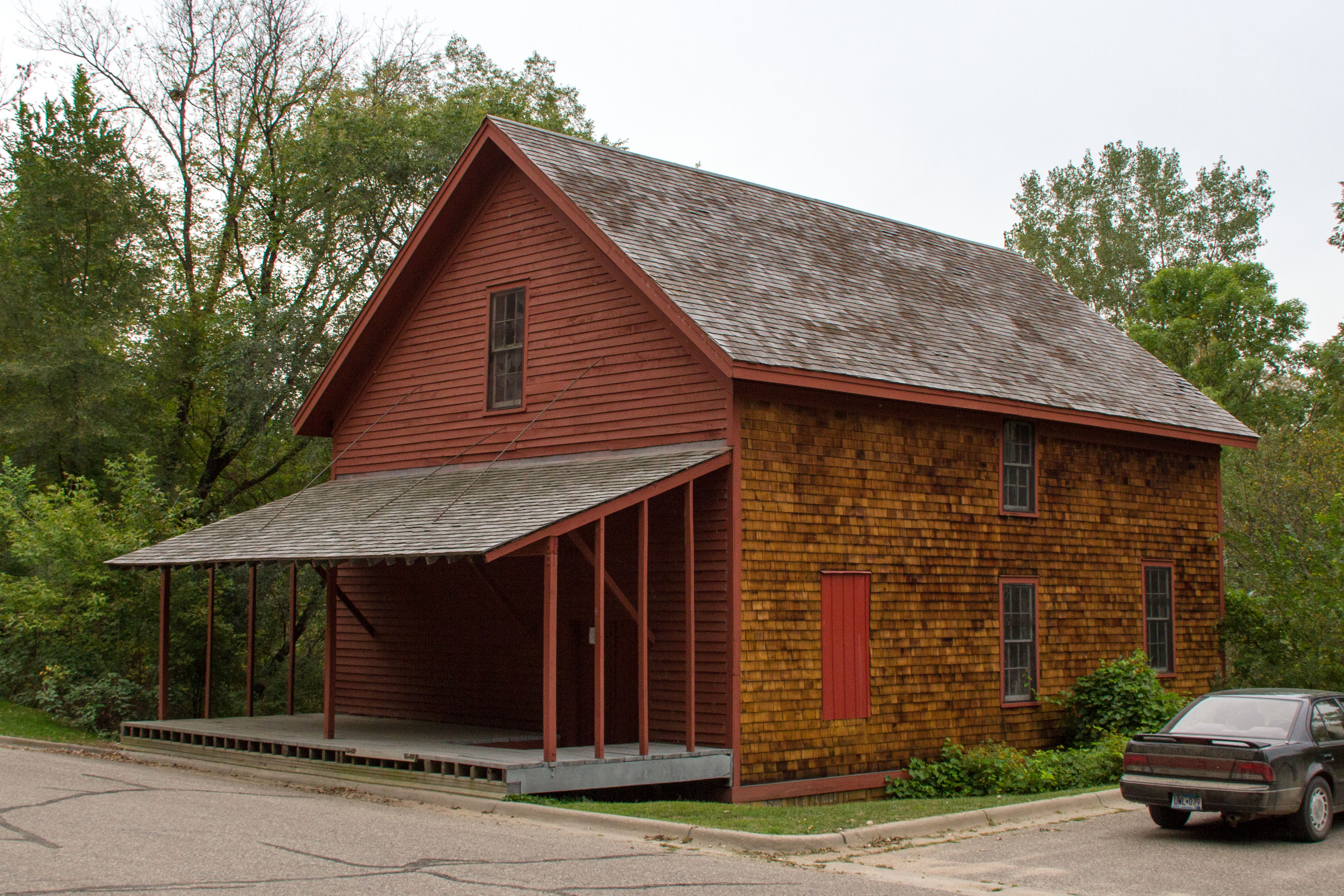
- The Fair Haven Flour Mill viewed from the west

- Location within Minnesota Location within the United States
- Location: 5001 Birchdale Road, Fairhaven, Minnesota
- Coordinates: 45°19′1″N 94°12′53″W
- Area: 13.2 acres (5.3 ha)
- Built: 1867
- NRHP reference No.: 78001574
- Added to NRHP: April 14, 1978

The Fair Haven Flour Mill is a historic former mill on the Clearwater River in the unincorporated community of Fairhaven, Minnesota, United States. Built in 1867, it is the third-oldest mill still standing in Minnesota. The mill ceased operations in 1942 and the milling equipment was sold for scrap when metal was in short supply during World War II. The vacant mill was damaged by flooding and vandals in subsequent decades, but was restored in the 1970s and protected by the Fair Haven Mill Association. The mill is now preserved in Fairhaven Mill Park, which is owned and operated by adjacent Wright County with financial assistance from Stearns County.

The mill was listed on the National Register of Historic Places in 1978 for its local significance in the themes of commerce, engineering, and industry. It was nominated for being one of the area's few surviving water-powered mills and one of the oldest extant mill buildings anywhere in Minnesota.

== See also ==
- List of watermills in the United States
- National Register of Historic Places listings in Stearns County, Minnesota
