= Raritan River Freight Station =

Raritan River
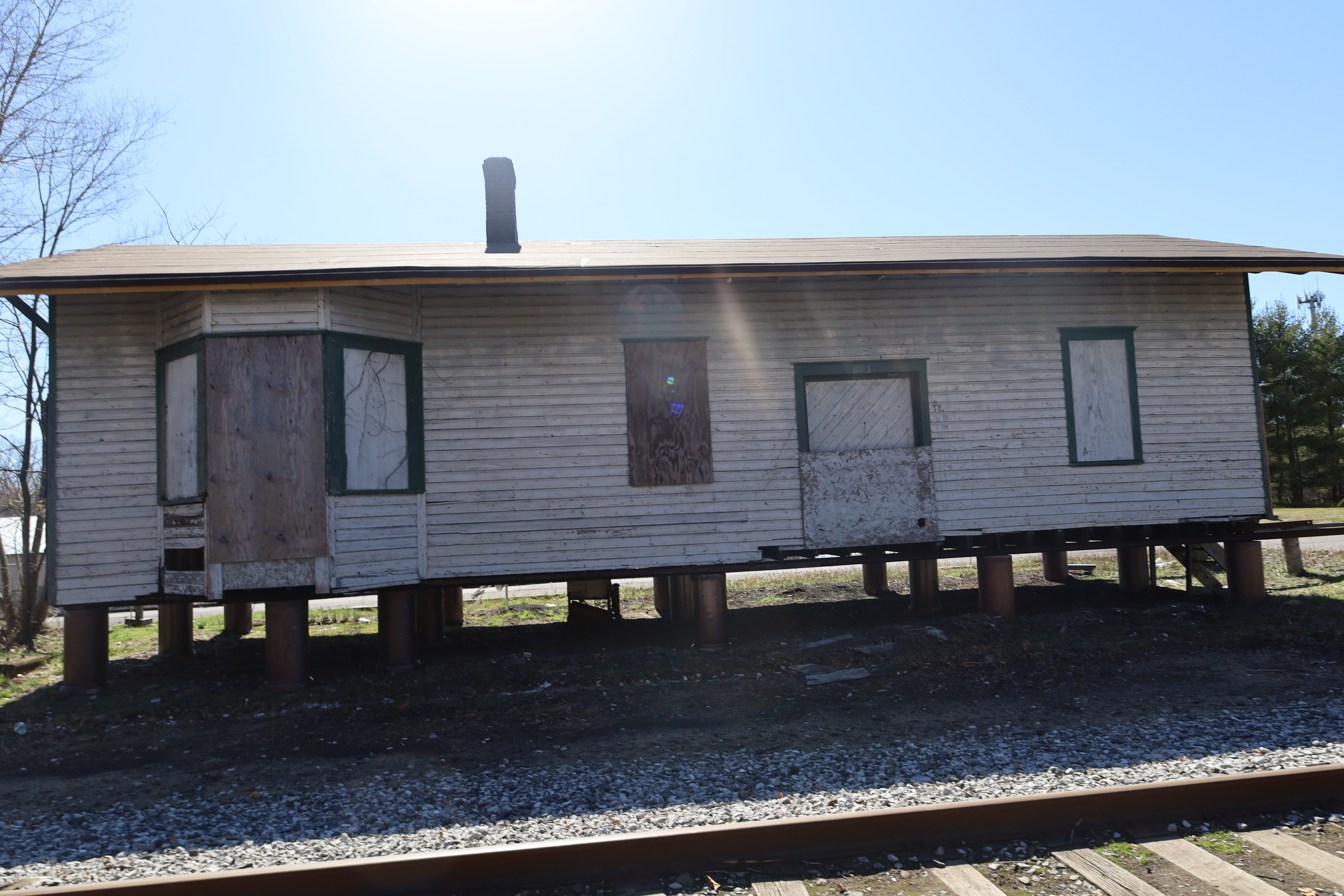
- The Raritan River Railroad Freight Station in 2023.

General information
- Location: Washington Avenue, Milltown, New Jersey; USA
- Coordinates: 40°27′11″N 74°26′00″W
- System: Freight station
- Owner: James Curran (local lawyer)
- Tracks: 1

History
- Opened: early 1900s
- Closed: April 1980
Location

The Raritan River Freight Station is the only surviving station of the Raritan River Railroad and is located in Milltown, New Jersey. It is privately owned by James Curran who has agreed to sell the station to the Raritan River Railroad Historical Society for one dollar if they can find the means of moving it off of his property.

== History ==
The freight station was built in the early 1900s, it was a shelter that had been renovated to a station. The first passenger train had reached Milltown in 1891, possibly because at that time, the Meyer Company had the Lawrence Brook Mill running day and night. And with the railroad, the industry of Milltown flourished. On March 24, 1934, the station had gotten an express system and a Railway Express agent to ship mail and cargo through the Raritan River Railroad (RRRR). As World War I hit the United States, the station became busier, with an average of 22 passenger trains running per day. And with the ammunition plant in Sayreville, about 9000 passengers came through the station per day.

A schedule for the freight station. Every stop is on the Raritan River Railroad

But in the 1930s, the Depression hit Milltown and the station hard. The Michelin Tire Company (the former Meyer Company) left the mill, making freight volumes go down by nearly 50%. The freight station was almost abandoned in favor of buses, and fewer passenger trains stopped there. By 1938, there was only one passenger train left that stopped in the station. New Brunswick and South Amboy also had services choked off. By April, barely anyone would enter the station. Even the express freight would not pass through the station again. Though the station was in business, the trains didn't move as fast; not much would change over the next 30 years.

World War II brought a temporary surge of traffic to the station, as well as dirt and sand for the construction of the New Jersey Turnpike in the 1950s. Steam engines were replaced by diesel engines in 1956, and the Lawrence Brook Mill was rented to a few other companies. It kept the line connected, but rarely used. After that, only packages would go in and out of the station; the freight used was called less than car load (LCL) freight. But this service was discontinued in the 1960s. There was a transition from an industrial based to a commercial based economy in New Jersey. In the early 1970s, the RRRR had been subsequently owned by the Central Jersey Railroad Company, which had been bankrupt since 1967. In 1971, Penn Central Railroad also went bankrupt. The Consolidated Railroad Company (Conrail) was created by the US government to acquire all of the bankrupt companies such as Penn Central; it was necessary to keep freight moving for the economy in 1976. Amtrak was created for the same goal in 1971; only it was to move people from city to city. The RRRR would not join the 1976 Conrail system, not until April 1980 was it absorbed into Conrail because all of the freight's parent companies had been absorbed.

The Raritan River Chapter of the NRHS have raised for funds to for the process of moving and restoring the freight station. Minor setbacks have occurred such as the rapid deterioration of the station as well as the main freight door being broken into. However these events haven't deterred the Raritan River NRHS and with an agreeable price for a concrete foundation with Milltown-based Brown and Glynn.
