= New Liberty =

New Liberty may refer to:

In the United States:

- New Liberty, Illinois
- New Liberty, Indiana
- New Liberty, Iowa
- New Liberty, Kentucky
- New Liberty, Missouri
