= Fairhaven Township =

Fairhaven Township may refer to the following places in the United States:

- Fairhaven Township, Carroll County, Illinois
- Fairhaven Township, Michigan
- Fair Haven Township, Stearns County, Minnesota
