= Raritan River Railroad =

Shortline railroad in New Jersey, USA

Raritan River Rail Road

Overview
- Headquarters: 170 John Street, South Amboy, New Jersey
- Reporting mark: RR
- Locale: Central New Jersey
- Dates of operation: 1888–1980

Technical
- Track gauge: 4 ft 8 1/2 in (1,435 mm) standard gauge

The Raritan River Rail Road (reporting mark RR) was a 12-mile (19 km) shortline railroad in Middlesex County in the U.S. state of New Jersey, Founded in 1888, it was based in South Amboy, from which it ran west as far as New Brunswick. It served both passengers and freight in its heyday and operated profitably throughout much of its existence. The Raritan River was absorbed into Conrail in 1980, becoming a branch line of Conrail Shared Assets Operations. It terminates at U.S. Route 1 in North Brunswick.

== History ==
=== Construction ===
The Raritan River Rail Road was built when the peak of the U.S. railroad building fever was subsiding in the late 1880s. It was intended to extend from South Amboy to Bound Brook and New Brunswick. On April 21, 1888, Articles of Incorporation were filed in New Brunswick for the Raritan River Rail Road, with $40,000 paid in capital, amounting to $2,000 per mile, and capital stock of $100,000. At the first meeting of the board of directors in April 1888, Edward H. Ripley was elected president, E. W. Harrison was appointed Chief Engineer, and a construction contract to build the railroad was awarded.During its peak years, the railroad played a crucial role in the development of Middlesex County's industrial sector, specifically by transporting clay and brick products from the Sayreville area to broader markets.

Construction started in Sayreville in May 1888 with 60 lb/yd (30 kg/m) rail, with a few trains running by the end of that same year. The line started in Sayreville, New Jersey, with a connection with the Pennsylvania Railroad (PRR) over Suchs’ Pennsylvania Railroad siding. Suchs was a sand and clay industry that already had a very long siding from the Pennsylvania Railroad's old Camden and Amboy line in Sayreville (connected a few miles west of today's Browns Yard). When the line east from Sayreville to South Amboy was completed, a connection was made with the Central Railroad of New Jersey (CNJ) over the New York & Long Branch, providing the Raritan River Railroad with connections to the two larger railroads. The Raritan was extended westward from Milltown to New Brunswick in 1891 and a new PRR connection was constructed in South Amboy in 1901, permitting abandonment of the original PRR connection at Suchs' siding.

In 1888, the Raritan River Rail Road began operation with two 4-4-0 engines (No.1 and No.2) and 20-short-ton (18 t) gondola cars. These small cars were used by Suchs and Crossmans to move the sand and clay found in the area.

Disputes with workers and clashes with local landowners during the construction of the Raritan River Railroad sparked sometimes heated conflict. On August 16, 1888, just four months after construction had started, an incident required summoning the local sheriff. One contractor, Charles Van Houghton of Jersey City, was hired to grade the road and lay stone culverts at South Amboy. Although Van Houghton was paid $5,000 for the work, he was reported to have absconded without paying his workers their wages. The unpaid workers went on strike as a result, and the sheriff confiscated Van Houghton's equipment so that the payroll could be met.

A Saturday night clash resulting in a death occurred in Sayreville, New Jersey, on May 5, 1889, which would become known thereafter as the "Sayreville Riot". A local brick manufacturer, Noah Furman, owned land needed by the railroad for the extension of its line from Sayreville to South River. As reported by The New York Times, a "frightful riot" ensued when gangs on both sides fought over the railroad's attempt to seize the land by force when negotiations had stalemated and Furman obtained a court injunction restraining the railroad from crossing his property and asserting eminent domain. One of the riot participants was killed in the melee. Afterwards, two Raritan Rail Road officials were charged with murder in connection with the riot.

Coverage of the Sayreville Riot arrests was sensationalized by the press, with the New York Times falsely reporting on September 16, 1889, that indictments of all officers of the Raritan River Railroad were expected in the case. The following day, the court in New Brunswick announced it was investigating who leaked the rumor to the Times. Some reporters were summoned to appear before the court to reveal their sources and explain how they obtained their information. It appears that all charges were eventually dropped. Later that year, on October 30, 1889, another labor dispute again required intervention by the sheriff when a sub-contractor's laborers rioted in South River due to not being paid their wages.

=== Early years ===
Main Line Stations (as of May 28, 1893) Branches in gray
Station name	Distance
South Amboy	—
Bergen Hill	1.1 miles (1.8 km)
Roberts	2.3 miles (3.7 km)
Melfort	2.7 miles (4.3 km)
Sayreville Junction	3.5 miles (5.6 km)
Sayreville Branch	to Sayreville - 2 miles (3.2 km)
Edgars	4.8 miles (7.7 km)
Vandeventers	5.7 miles (9.2 km)
South River	6.4 miles (10.3 km)
Milltown	9.9 miles (15.9 km)
New Brunswick	11.9 miles (19.2 km)

As construction of the mainline was progressing west towards New Brunswick, the first two branch lines were built: in 1890, the 2.1-mile (3.4 km) Sayreville Branch to access the Sayre and Fisher Brick Yards near the mouth of the Raritan River; one mile (1.6 km) of the Serviss Branch in East Brunswick was started in 1891 to access the sand and clay needed by Sayre and Fisher. The third locomotive (No. 3) was purchased in 1890 and fourteen 30-ton freight cars were ordered.

By July 4, 1891, the RRRR's first train left Milltown, and shortly thereafter the line reached New Brunswick, having laid twelve miles (19 km) of mainline track. The railroad decided not to cross the Raritan River into New Brunswick to reach Bound Brook, due to the expense and lack of potential freight business at the time in the largely undeveloped area.

Between 1888 and 1898, the line had 3 engines, 34 freight cars, 6 passenger cars, 12 miles (19 km) of main line, and two branch lines.

After the line was built, both the Pennsylvania Railroad and the Central Railroad of New Jersey started to buy stock in the Raritan. The PRR acquired a 40% ownership share and the Central 60%. Although wholly owned by the two bigger lines, the RRRR was locally managed from its headquarters on John Street in South Amboy.

In the 1890s, the RRRR continued upgrading its track, building stations, and generally upgrading its infrastructure. It acquired several small locomotives, adding to the roster as traffic increased. The first customers on the line were the brick companies, the clay and sand pits of Crossman's and Such's. Crossman's in Sayreville grew so large that a narrow gauge line running in the pits brought the sand and clay to the connection with the RRRR.

Sayreville Junction was created almost at the midpoint of the line for the storage and classification of cars. RRRR trains would run straight from either the NYLB or PRR connection, and drop off the cars at Sayreville Junction, where they would be sorted for the runs either east or west at that point.

The 1900s saw the second branch line extended, the Serviss Branch was increased from one to four miles (6.4 km). This line ran from the RRRR main in East Brunswick, headed north, and curved back south towards South River again. The terminus of the Serviss Branch was just one mile (1.6 km) from the RRRR's South River Station. This branch was built to service the many sand and clay pits that were opening along the area. Even a small brickyard was located at the end of this branch at Reid Street. During this same period, the current Sanford Street terminus in New Brunswick was finished, with elaborate brick passenger and freight stations. Two more engines were purchased to help with the increase in freight. Engines No.4 and No.5 were added to the roster in 1899 and 1900. A small batch of larger cars were ordered, five 40-ton cars. In about 1901, the first number 3 engine was replaced with a second, more powerful number 3.

In 1905 the South River Branch was built, two miles (3.2 km) south from the South River station. Engine No. 6 was added to the roster in 1905. By 1905, the Raritan River with its six locomotives had doubled its engine roster compared to the three engines it had in 1898. In around 1907, both engines No. 1 and No. 2 were replaced by more powerful engines, which were assigned the same numbers.

Freight traffic continued to grow substantially, necessitating larger gondolas. The Raritan River ordered forty-four 50-ton cars in 1910, for a total of 83 cars on its roster. Passenger service was never an important revenue source for the RRRR, which owned only six passenger cars in 1910. In Milltown, the Michelin Tire Company constructed a massive tire manufacturing complex employing more than 2,000 employees. Tons of raw materials and finished products rolled in and out of Milltown on the Raritan River.

The Milltown Station was a very busy place at train time. It had a Railway Express agent and priority packages were shipped on special rail cars attached to RRRR passenger trains for connections to other railroads, providing express rail shipment capability nationwide. Passenger traffic was also growing rapidly, so the RRRR purchased 12 passenger cars and 2 combine cars from the Delaware, Lackawanna and Western Railroad in 1915. Engine number 7 was added to the roster in 1912, engine number 8 was added in 1914, and engines 9 and 10 were added in 1915, bringing the total number of locomotives on the Raritan River to ten. By 1917, this would further increase to a total of 15 engines on the RRRR.

During 1917, the Gillespie Branch was built into an isolated wooded area, to access the T Gillespie Powder Works. With Gillespie, DuPont, and Hercules all making munitions for World War I, it was a very busy time on the RRRR. At its peak, DuPont was supplying four 50-ton cars per day of weapons and/or munitions. The Gillespie site was destroyed on October 4, 1918, by many explosions.

In addition to munition plant shipments along the line, World War I also resulted in a substantial increase in passenger traffic. In 1917, two more Lackawanna passenger cars were added. In 1918, passenger traffic reached an all-time high, with 22 daily passenger trains and 7 extra trains on Sundays. The Raritan River had 15 Engines and 16 passenger cars, as well as about 83 freight cars, moving 9,000 passengers per day and 1.5 million tons of freight and war materials in 1918.

=== Interbellum ===
Main Line Stations (as of January 27, 1936) Stations with passenger service in blue Branches in gray
Station name	Distance
South Amboy	—
Stevens Avenue	0.3 miles (0.5 km)
Bergen Hill	1.1 miles (1.8 km)
Phoenix	2 miles (3.2 km)
Sayreville Junction	3.5 miles (5.6 km)
Sayreville Branch	to Sayreville - 2 miles (3.2 km)
Parlin	4 miles (6.4 km)
Gillespie	5.1 miles (8.2 km)
Vandeventers	5.8 miles (9.3 km)
South River	6.4 miles (10.3 km)
South River Branch	to Wrights - 1 mile (1.6 km)
Serviss Junction	7.9 miles (12.7 km)
Serviss Branch	to South River (Reid Street) - 4 miles (6.4 km)
Milltown	9.9 miles (15.9 km)
New Brunswick	12.3 miles (19.8 km)

After the war ended, traffic subsided and engine number 8 was retired. In 1919, a new 12-stall roundhouse and shops were built near Stevens Avenue.

The 1920s saw a decline in freight and passengers, with increased competition from buses, cars, and trucks beginning to have an adverse effect upon the RRRR. In 1924, Moody's listed the Raritan as having only 50 freight cars, 44 50-ton and 6 40-ton. All 30-ton and 20-ton cars were scrapped. By 1925, only six of the 14 former Lackawanna passenger cars remained on the RRRR's roster. Locomotive #11 was wrecked and engines No. 3, No. 4, and No. 6 were scrapped. The Milltown Spur, or Fresh Ponds Spur, was built in 1925 to access a sand and clay pit just south of Milltown. By the late 1920s, engines No. 1 and No. 2 were also scrapped. By the end of 1929, the Raritan River Railroad had just eight working engines.

The Great Depression accelerated the downturn in business on the Raritan. The Michelin Tire Company closed its Milltown plant in early 1930, devastating the small town. Most of the sand and clay pits also shut down during those times, and service on the Serviss Branch was almost non-existent. Revenue traffic fell by half and passenger service was reduced considerably, to just four daily trains by 1930, compared to 22 in 1917. By the mid-1930s, the RRRR had only two ex-Lackawanna Railroad passenger coaches remaining of the original fourteen. The last two original 4-wheeled cabooses were scrapped. Engine No. 7 was scrapped in 1933; engine No. 12 was scrapped in 1937.

As of April 27, 1936, the Raritan River had only one scheduled round-trip passenger train, operating daily except Sundays between Parlin and New Brunswick. It left New Brunswick as Train #2 at 6:35 am, making stops at Milltown and South River, and arrived at Parlin 6:55 am. Return train #7 departed Parlin at 3:50 pm, arriving at 4:44 pm. On weekdays, the Raritan River also operated a through single tripper from Stevens Avenue in South Amboy as #1, at 5:45 am, making stops at Bergen Hill, Parlin, South River, and Milltown, arriving at New Brunswick 6:24 am.

By 1937, the multitude of sand, clay, and brick industries that contributed greatly to the Raritan River's success in the early years were virtually all gone. But Crossman's and Whitheads' did survive, and were starting to grow again. About half of the 50-ton gondola freight cars purchased in 1910 and used to service these industries were scrapped by 1937. The last combination passenger car, No. 22, was also scrapped in 1937, ending baggage service on the Raritan River Railroad and leaving the line with just one passenger car, No. 27.

The first two Lackawanna cabooses appeared on the line in 1937, numbers 5 and 6.

In 1938, the end of an era was reached on the Raritan River Railroad as passenger service was discontinued altogether after a half century of service. The last passenger train pulled out from the New Brunswick station on April 17, 1938. This closure allowed the Raritan to eventually tear down the Bergen Hill station and consolidate all business to the Parlin Station. The former Milltown and New Brunswick passenger stations were converted to freight stations.

The North Jersey Chapter of the NRHS sponsored a special excursion train on May 28, 1938, over the Raritan to mark the passing of regular scheduled passenger service. The special train left New Brunswick at 2:40 pm, stopped at the Lawrence Brook Trestle for photos, then proceeded up the Serviss Branch where it parked at Hendersons Siding just 15 feet (4.6 m) away from the Route 18 crossing. Many motorists stopped and gazed at the strange passenger train, as the Serviss Branch never had regularly scheduled passenger service. The special then proceeded back down the main and headed to South River, where participants observed the only manually hand-cranked swing bridge in New Jersey. They then proceeded to Sayreville Junction, where they witnessed the passing of a freight train and the switching of freight cars. Eventually the group made it to South Amboy where they were given a tour of the RRRR shops and roundhouse area. The special then "high-balled" back to New Brunswick, with special permission granted to reach 40 miles per hour (64 km/h).

In 1938, a new engine appeared on the line, the first time in almost 23 years since the prior engine purchases in 1916 during World War I. The economic recovery by the late 1930s resulted in an increase in freight, necessitating the purchase of another engine, numbered 8 after the one that had been scrapped in 1919.

=== World War II ===
The 1940s brought World War II, and its associated increase in freight traffic. Another engine was added to the line in 1941, numbered 7 after the one scrapped in 1937. After the war's end, the RRRR purchased seven surplus US Army engines for only $100,000, allowing the retirement of the line's elderly locomotives. In 1947, locomotive No. 15 was involved in a wreck at the PRR connection and scrapped on the spot.

=== Post-war ===
Active Customers in 1979
Company	Stop	Revenue
National Lead	Phoenix Branch	30%
Hercules Chemical Company	Parlin	16%
Sunshine Biscuits	Gillespie Branch	8%
C&E	New Brunswick	8%
Continental Baking Company	East Brunswick Branch	7%
Cel Fibe (Personal Products)		7%
Personal Products	Milltown	6%
H&F	Milltown	5%
NJ Steel	Phoenix Branch	3%
Squibb	New Brunswick	3%
Premium Plastics	Milltown	2%
DuPont	Parlin	2%

The 1950s brought dieselization to the RRRR, as the remaining ex-USRA engines were replaced with six EMD SW900 engines by the fall of 1954. The retirement of steam also meant that the roundhouse could be closed, reducing expenses considerably for the shortline. The Serviss Branch was abandoned and scrapped in 1956, after being dormant for almost a decade. The Fresh Ponds spur in Milltown was also removed.

A temporary boost in tonnage on the Raritan occurred because of construction of the New Jersey Turnpike, which generated fill material and sand movements. With Crossmanns' help, the RRRR built a small loop track in Crossmann's pits and moved hundreds of cars of sand. Major online shippers included National Lead, DuPont, Hercules, and Johnson & Johnson.

The industrial base of the East Coast was moving away, and this affected the RRRR along with all other eastern railroads. By 1964, all Less-Car-Load (LCL) freight was eliminated, and agents in the freight stations were dropped. By now most coal traffic was gone. The Raritan River acquired a damaged N&W boxcar after an insurance company write-off, and rebuilt it as No. 100 for non-interchange usage, to move freight back and forth between on-line companies.

Although both parents of the RRRR, the CNJ and the Penn Central were bankrupt, the Raritan River remained solvent and continued to benefit from a major new industrial complex named Highview, which was built in East Brunswick with many spurs and industries connected. The old Serviss Branch was re-laid for two miles (3.2 km) and renamed the East Brunswick branch to serve Continental Bakery, which received many shipments of flour by rail. Sunshine Biscuit opened a plant at the end of the Gillespie Branch, and they too received flour by the RRRR. The South River Branch was upgraded, as well as the trackage in New Brunswick, for a new customer starting a rail-to-truck transfer there. The old Michelin Tire complex was rented and some freight traffic was generated there. The Raritan River also derived revenue from high per diem rates, leasing 100 fifty-foot box cars in 1975.

The Raritan River had its best revenue year in 1979, with operating revenues amounting to $1,968,671. The Raritan emphasized customer service and benefited from having longtime online customers such as Dupont and Hercules (Formally Smokeless Powder Company) going back to the 1910s. Sunshine Biscuit kept the Gillespie branch alive, just as Continental Baking kept the East Brunswick branch active. This allowed continued rail service to several small and infrequent shippers, which would otherwise have been ended.

With the creation of Conrail in April 1976 to take over the failing eastern railroads, the then-profitable Raritan River was supposed to be included along with their bankrupt parent railroads. The RRRR resisted inclusion in Conrail and took court action to forestall it. Four years later, on April 24, 1980, the Raritan River Railroad merged into the Conrail system.

=== Subsequent Conrail Ownership ===
Conrail Shared Assets Operations (CSAO) is jointly owned CSX and Norfolk Southern. Once merged into the Conrail system, the 12-mile (19 km) Raritan River Railroad mainline was renamed Conrail's Sayreville Running Track, and would be switched out of Conrail's Browns Yard near Bordentown Avenue via a new connection built after the merger. This required major upgrades to Browns Yard, as all classifications and storage were performed there instead of Sayreville Junction.

The old wooden and outdated steel cabooses were sold, and replaced with steel Conrail cabooses. The remaining 97 leased fifty-foot box cars were re-numbered and absorbed into Conrail. The six EMD SW900s were re-numbered for Conrail and did switch the RRRR line for a few years. All but one were scrapped in 1984, with former RRRR #4 being sold to PECO Energy Company for use at their plant in Eddystone, Pennsylvania. Most union employees were assimilated into Conrail. The clerical and managerial staff were all terminated. Of the 56 employees on the payroll in 1980, 30 would be offered jobs with Conrail, 26 would not.

Conrail closed shops in South Amboy. The interchange in South Amboy for PRR was closed in 1976. Conrail later extended the Gillespie Branch (renamed the Gillespie Running Track) to cross Bordentown Avenue and connect directly with Browns Yard, enabling abandonment of the South Amboy connection with NJ Transit's North Jersey Coast Line. The line was then cut back to the Phoenix Spur, which currently receives freight in the form of scrap steel. The abandoned engine shop was lost to fire in 1983.

The New Brunswick and Parlin stations were demolished by the early 1990s. The Milltown spur to the former Michelin Tire Complex is severed from the main line, but still crosses Main Street (and has been re-laid after repaving). The Milltown spur and Michelin Complex are listed on the New Jersey Register of Historic Places. Trackage currently terminates at Silverline Windows in North Brunswick, east of U.S. Route 1.

In the 1980s and 1990s, some of the largest customers ceased shipping by rail: Dupont stopped receiving deliveries and their siding is now disconnected. National Lead—at one time the railroad's largest customer—closed and is listed as a brownfield site. Hercules is still connected, receiving an occasional boxcar. Both the Sunshine Biscuit and Continental Baking plants have shut down. The Gillespie Branch survives since it connects to CSAO Browns Yard. The East Brunswick branch is still connected. Several spurs also remain connected but do not have active customers. A single customer based in the Highview Industrial Complex in East Brunswick also receives freight. The South River Branch was abandoned in the early 1980s.

Plans to expand the rail-to-truck transfer facility at the former New Brunswick facilities were dropped by Conrail, despite support for the project by the New Jersey Department of Transportation and the city of New Brunswick. As a result, the entire complex was eventually demolished and the wye area in New Brunswick was redeveloped with townhouses.

By the late 1990s, the last customer in New Brunswick—Squibb, stopped getting tank cars. The former Johnson & Johnson plant in Milltown is now used by Silverline Windows, which receives covered hoppers containing plastic pellets. In October 2014, the siding at the former National Lead site was reactivated for the shipment of radiologically contaminated soils to out-of-state disposal facilities.

The sole surviving station is in Milltown, which still proudly displays its original sign: "Raritan River Railroad – Freight Station". It is in a deteriorating condition and plans are being made by the Raritan River Chapter of the NRHS and the Borough of Milltown to move it to another location and restore it. The current owner, attorney James Curran, has indicated he would "consider donating it." The RRRR logo can still be seen through the rust on the swing bridge in South River.

== Surviving equipment ==
Four pieces of original RRRR equipment are known to be in existence. A fifth piece has unknown whereabouts and may have been scrapped.

Surviving Railcars
Car	Location	Notes
Caboose #7	Allaire State Park, Wall Township, New Jersey	Removed from trucks, restored to RRRR colors, and used as the office for the New Jersey Museum of Transportation's Pine Creek Railroad.
Caboose #8	Ivyland, Pennsylvania	No information available
Caboose #10	Boonton, New Jersey	Owned by Tri-State Railway Historical Society. Fully restored to RRRR paint and operational. Stored at United Railroad Historical Society of New Jersey restoration yard.
Boxcar #100	Quakertown, Pennsylvania	Located along East Penn Railroad at Quakertown Depot; painted in RRRR livery; currently used for storage.
SW900 #4	Unknown	River SW900 #4 was rumored moved off of PECO's Eddystone property in 7/2016. Its fate has been unknown since.

== Operations ==
Remaining Customers
Mile	Company	Materials
1.0	CMC Steel	scrap (inbound), rebars (outbound), coke (outbound)
4.6	Ashland Global	nitric acid (CLOSED 7/31/2025)
5.7	Riverside Supply	brick (Inactive by rail 2020)
9.4	Mauser	plastic
11.2	Silverline Windows	plastic

Under CSAO, three former RRRR locations remain with active customers. Trains operate almost weekday daily from Browns Yard.

CMC Steel in Sayreville is on the eastern end of the former Phoenix Spur and currently receives and ships steel shipments along with coke by-product from steel production. Ashland receives chemicals for manufacturing purposes at the old Hercules location. Bricks are delivered to Riverside Supply via a team track. While the lead is still connected, Riverside has not seen rail service since 2020. Ashland closed its Sayreville plant at the end of July 2025 as part of the company's streamlining initiatives.

On the other side of the swing bridge, Mauser is the only company left in the East Brunswick Highview complex still receiving freight. The East Brunswick spur is no longer connected to the main line. Of almost a dozen spurs once in East Brunswick, only one currently receives freight. On the western end, Silverline Windows still receives cars of plastic pellets. Trains only run 1-3 times a week past the swing bridge to service Mauser and Silverline.

== Passenger proposal ==
New Jersey Transit and Middlesex County, New Jersey, are studying potential future light rail options in the New Brunswick, New Jersey, area to alleviate traffic congestion, including the former Raritan River Railroad right-of-way which parallels the busy Route 18 highway corridor.

== See also ==
- Freehold and Jamesburg Agricultural Railroad
- Monmouth Ocean Middlesex Line
- Middlesex Greenway
