= David Schwendeman =

American taxidermist

David James Schwendeman (December 5, 1924 – November 26, 2012) was an American taxidermist. Schwendeman was the last, full-time chief taxidermist for the American Museum of Natural History in New York City, serving in that position for twenty-nine years from 1959 until his retirement in 1988. Schwendeman was responsible for mounting and designing many of the specimens on display in the museum, including the collections in the Hall of North American Animals, the Hall of North American Birds, and the Hall of Reptiles and Amphibians.

== Background ==
Schwendeman was born on December 5, 1924, to Arthur and Lillian Falk Schwendeman. He learned the craft of taxidermy at the Schwendeman’s Taxidermy Studio, which was founded by his father, Arthur, on South Main Street in Milltown, New Jersey. He was a lifelong resident of Milltown. Following high school, Schwendeman served with the United States Marines during World War II.

Through Schwendeman's Taxidermy, David Schwendeman began working with the American Museum of Natural History during the 1950s. In 1959, the museum hired him as chief taxidermist.

He died at his home in Milltown, New Jersey, on November 28, 2012, at the age of 87. He was survived by his son, Bruce, and three daughters, Linda Schwendeman, Anna Lee Schwendeman and Mary Ellen Davis. Schwendeman’s Taxidermy Studio is now run by his son, Bruce.
