= Milltown India Rubber Company =

- U.S. National Register of Historic Places
- New Jersey Register of Historic Places
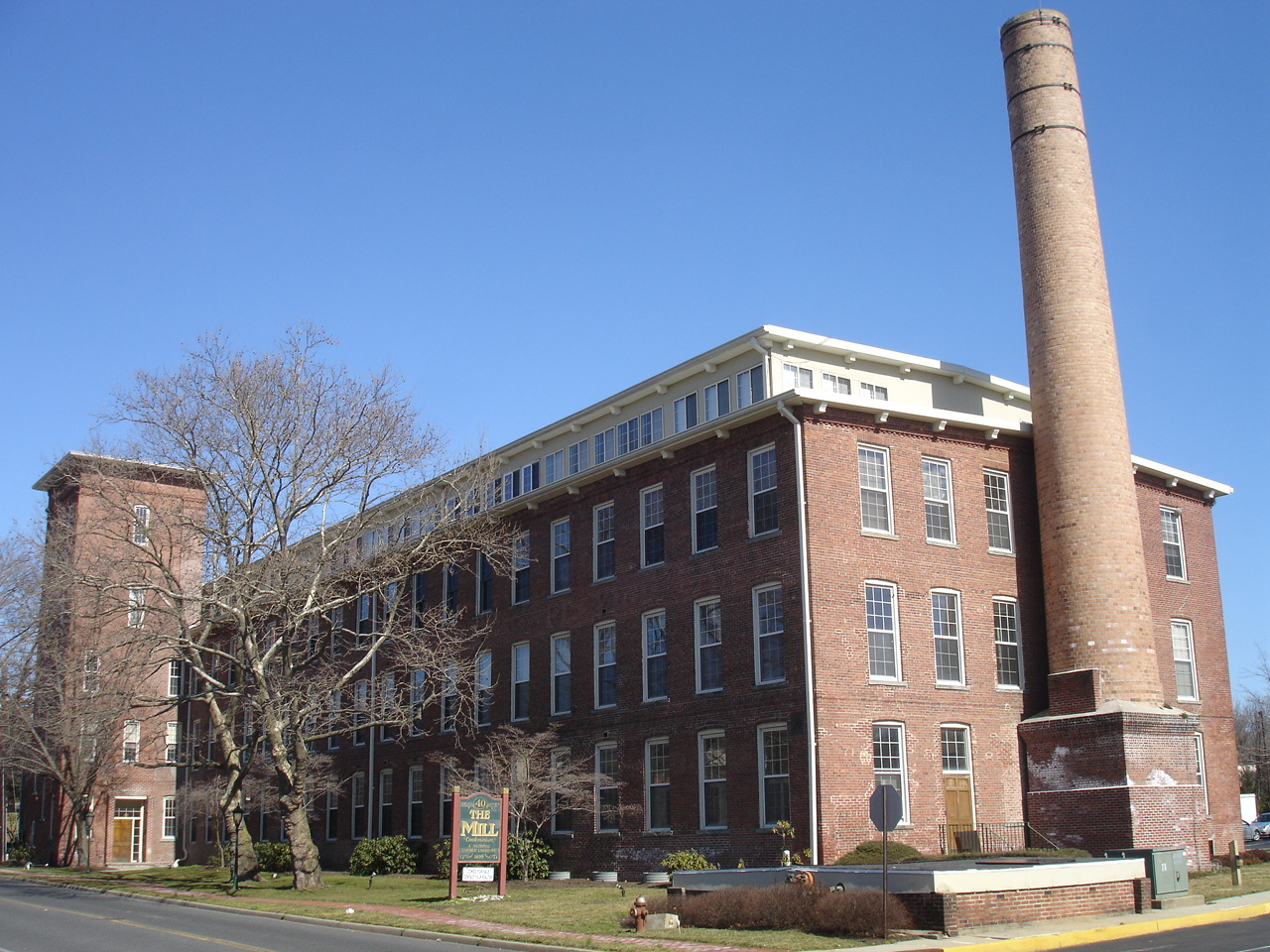

- Location within Middlesex County, New Jersey Location within New Jersey Location within the United States
- Location: 40 Washington Avenue, Milltown, New Jersey
- Coordinates: 40°27′10″N 74°26′06″W
- Area: 4.4 acres (1.8 ha)
- Built: 1899–1900
- Architect: George Parsell
- Architectural style: Italianate, Vernacular Italianate
- NRHP reference No.: 86000216
- NJRHP No.: 1850

Significant dates
- Added to NRHP: February 13, 1986
- Designated NJRHP: January 14, 1986

The Milltown India Rubber Company is a historic building located at 40 Washington Avenue in the borough of Milltown in Middlesex County, New Jersey, United States. Construction of the building started in 1899 and was completed in 1900. Designed by architect George Parsell with vernacular Italianate style, it was part of the rubber industry in the county. The building features a five story tower and a tall smokestack. It was added to the National Register of Historic Places on February 13, 1986, for its significance in architecture and industry.

== See also ==
- National Register of Historic Places listings in Middlesex County, New Jersey
