= List of Pennsylvania state historical markers in Union County =

Location of Union County in Pennsylvania

This is a list of the Pennsylvania state historical markers in Union County.

This is intended to be a complete list of the official state historical markers placed in Union County, Pennsylvania by the Pennsylvania Historical and Museum Commission (PHMC). The locations of the historical markers, as well as the latitude and longitude coordinates as provided by the PHMC's database, are included below when available. There are 22 historical markers located in Union County.

== Historical markers ==
Marker title	Image	Date dedicated	Location	Marker type	Topics
Bucknell University		September 22, 1947	U.S. 15 in Lewisburg at stadium 40.95194°N 76.88729°W	Roadside	Education, Religion, Women
Buffalo Church		June 9, 1948	Pa. 192, 4 miles W of Lewisburg; 40.96218°N 76.96781°W	Roadside	Buildings, Native American, Religion
Buffalo Church		June 9, 1948	Pa. 45, at Johnson Mill Rd., W of Lewisburg; 40.9453°N 76.96647°W	Roadside	Buildings, Native American, Religion
Col. John Kelly		March 21, 1952	SR 1002 just E of Mazeppa; 40.98936°N 76.9818°W	Roadside	American Revolution, Early Settlement, Military, Native American
Dry Run Cemetery		June 9, 1948	Pa. 304, 1 mile W of New Berlin (Missing); 40.8739°N 77.00804°W	Roadside	Early Settlement, French & Indian War, Military, Religion
Eli Slifer		October 4, 1968	U.S. 15 just N of Lewisburg; 40.97608°N 76.88773°W	Roadside	Civil War, Government & Politics, Government & Politics 19th Century, Military
Evangelical Church		September 22, 1947	Pa. 304, 1.2 miles W of New Berlin; 40.87797°N 76.99349°W	Roadside	Religion
Evangelical Church		September 22, 1947	Junction Pa. 45 (Chestnut St.) & 104 (10th St.), W end of Mifflinburg; 40.91425°N 77.05578°W	Roadside	Religion
Fought's Mill		September 22, 1947	Pa. 45 (Chestnut St.) at Buffalo Rd., Mifflinburg; 40.92101°N 77.03889°W	Roadside	American Revolution, Buildings, Business & Industry, Government & Politics 18th Century, Mills, Native American
General Tasker H. Bliss		November 22, 1954	115 S. Front St., Lewisburg; 40.96406°N 76.88112°W	City	Military, Military Post-Civil War
Lee Massacre		April 28, 1947	U.S. 15 at Winfield just S of Pa. 304; 40.91095°N 76.85368°W	Roadside	American Revolution, Military, Native American
Leroy Massacre		April 28, 1947	Pa. 104, 1.5 miles S of Mifflinburg; 40.89399°N 77.05192°W	Roadside	French & Indian War, Military, Native American
Leroy Massacre - PLAQUE		July 19, 1919	Ridge Rd. (SR 3016), 1 mile E of PA 304, between Mifflinburg and New Berlin; 40.90562°N 77.02756°W	Plaque	French & Indian War, Military, Native American
Lewisburg Cross-Cut Canal		January 3, 1955	Pa. 45 (Market St.) near bridge, Lewisburg	City	Canals, Navigation, Transportation
Ludwig Derr		November 22, 1954	34 Brown St., Lewisburg; 40.96117°N 76.88063°W	City	Government & Politics, Mills, Professions & Vocations
Robert Lowry		November 22, 1954	110 University Ave., Lewisburg; 40.95816°N 76.8816°W	City	Music & Theater, Religion, Writers
Samuel Maclay		April 28, 1947	Pa. 45, 4 miles SW of Lewisburg; 40.94409°N 76.46993°W	Roadside	Government & Politics, Government & Politics 18th Century
Shikellamy's Old Town - PLAQUE		August 1, 1921	Central Oak Heights just off US 15 southbound, S of West Milton; 41.01151°N 76.86809°W	Plaque	Cities & Towns, Early Settlement, Government & Politics 18th Century, Native American
Shikellamy's Town		April 28, 1947	U.S. 15, 3.6 miles N of Lewisburg - MISSING; 41.00144°N 76.86793°W	Roadside	Early Settlement, Native American
Underground Railroad		November 22, 1954	University Ave., Lewisburg	City	African American, Underground Railroad
Union County		May 10, 1982	County Courthouse, 2nd & St. Louis Sts., Lewisburg; 40.96345°N 76.88265°W	City	Government & Politics, Government & Politics 19th Century
Widow Catherine Smith		May 25, 1967	SR 1011 (old Rte. 15) at SR 1010, White Deer	Roadside	Business & Industry, Women

== See also ==
- List of Pennsylvania state historical markers
- National Register of Historic Places listings in Union County, Pennsylvania
