= Clearwater River (Mississippi River tributary) =

River in Minnesota, United States

Coordinates: 45.4227433°N 94.0491499°W

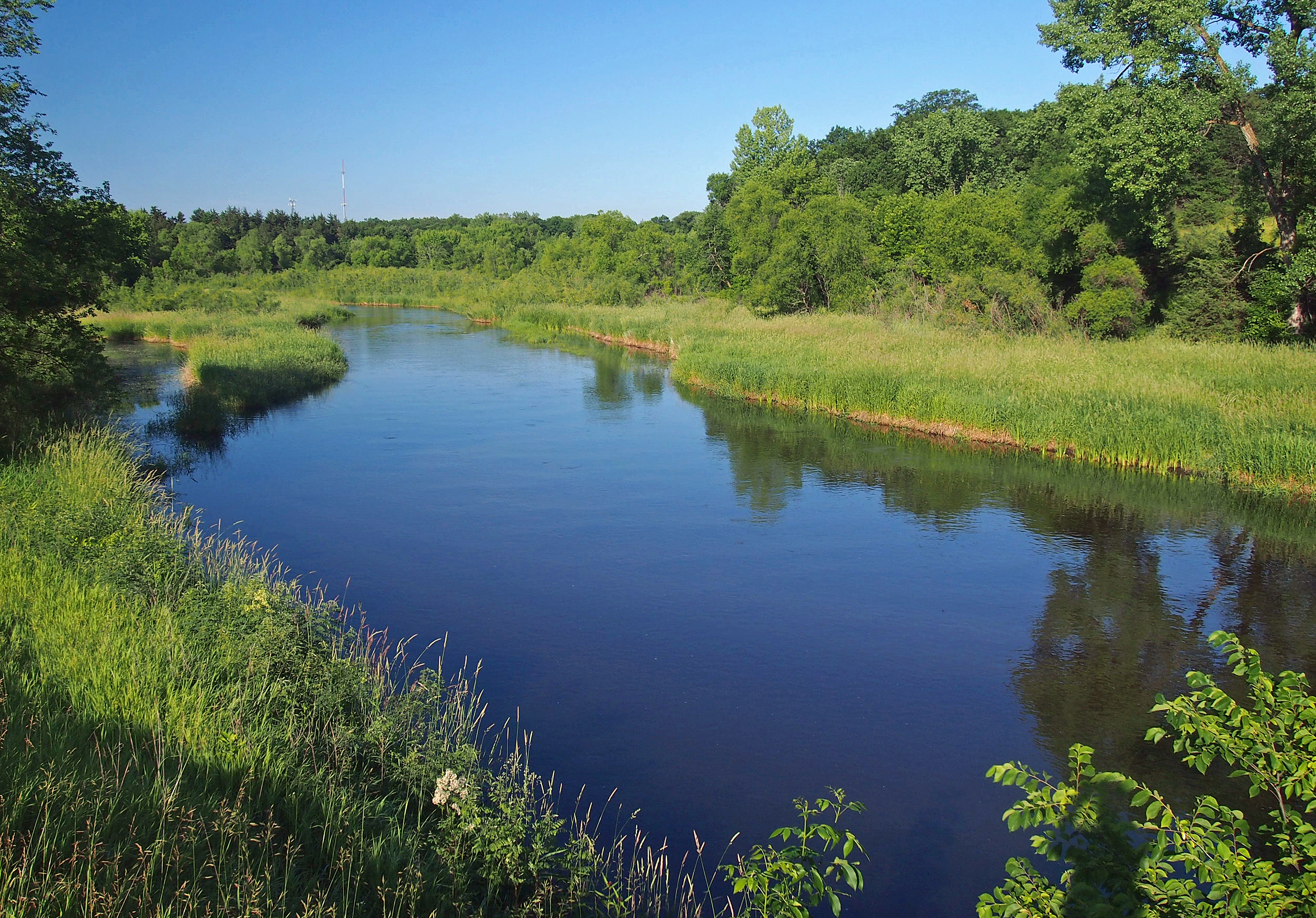
- The Clearwater River in Clearwater, Minnesota

Location
- Country: United States

Physical characteristics
- Source
  - location: Minnesota

The Clearwater River is a 43.4-mile-long (69.8 km) tributary of the Mississippi River in central Minnesota, United States.

It rises in southern Stearns County and flows south into Meeker County, passing the town of Watkins. It turns east and enters a chain of lakes, eventually becoming the border between Stearns County and Wright County, passing the town of Fairhaven and entering Clearwater Lake. Upon leaving the lake, the river flows northeast, joining the Mississippi River at Clearwater.

== See also ==
- List of rivers of Minnesota
