= Phoenix Mill (Virginia) =

Gristmill in Alexandria, Virginia, USA

Coordinates: 38°48′25.52″N 77°5′38.2″W

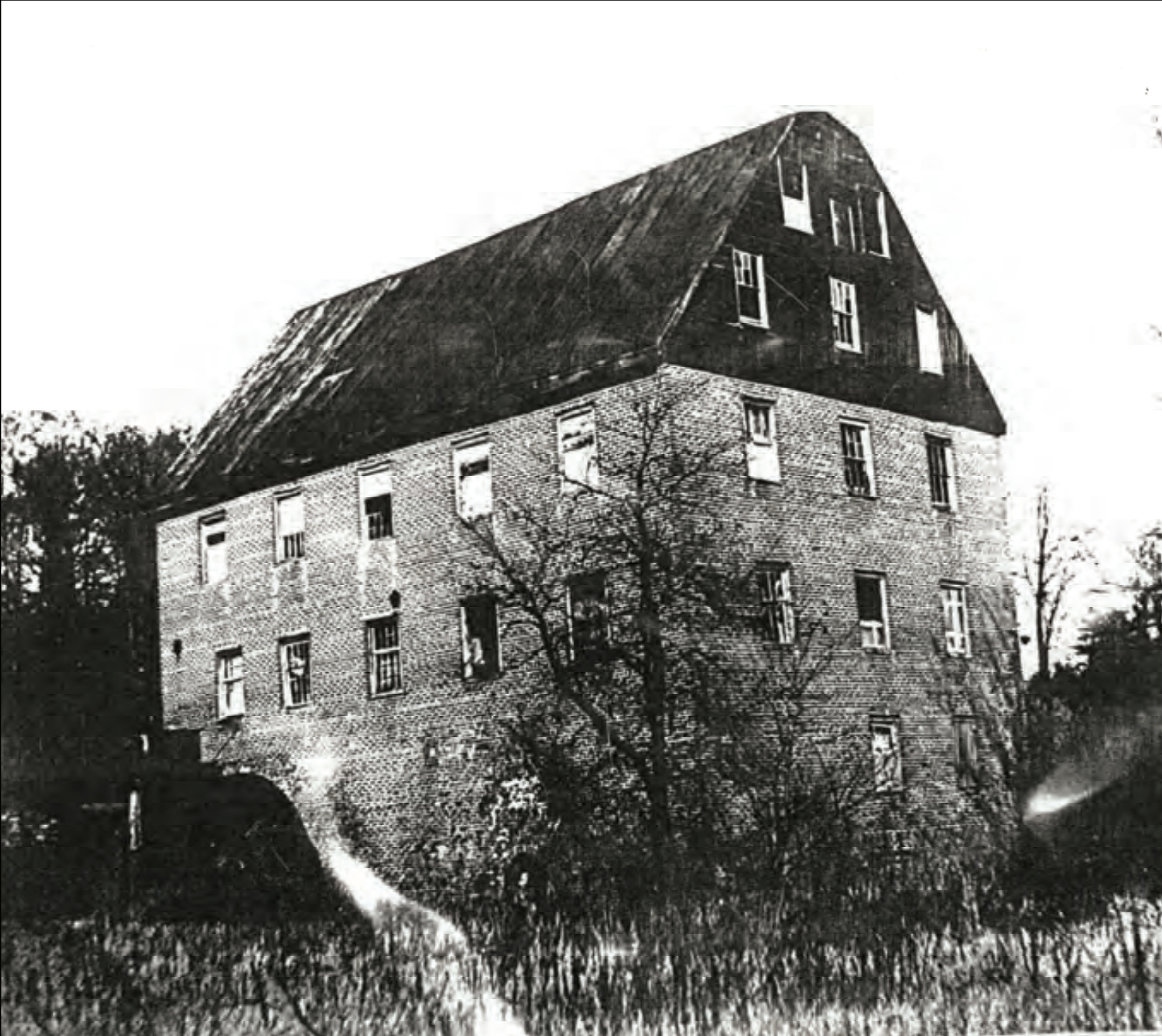
Phoenix Mill in the mid-1800s

Phoenix Mill (also named Dominion Mill and Brick Water Mill) is a historic gristmill built in 1801 and the last remaining gristmill building in Alexandria, Virginia. It was built on the same site as an earlier mill, built sometime between 1770 and 1789, with current best research putting it around 1776, that was destroyed in a fire.

William Hartshorne owned the mill when it burned down and rebuilt it as a four-story mill with four millstones. In 1812 it was offered up for auction as part of the larger Strawberry Hill farm and sold in 1813. It primarily milled wheat but also advertised having plaster available for sale in 1819.

It was sold for $9,000 in 1854 when it was advertised, with the name Brick Water Mill, as having four burrs and the capacity "to grind 100 barrels of flour per day". By 1865 it had been renamed Dominion Mill. By 1930 it had stopped operating.

As of 2023, it is unoccupied and was most recently occupied by the Flippo Construction company, and the land it sits on is 2.0 acres (0.81 ha) in size. The Alexandria Police Department opened a new headquarters near the site in 2011, and a self-storage facility is immediately adjoining the mill's site. As part of the self-storage facility development, in 2017, the development company and the city of Alexandria conducted a study and archaeological assessment of the property. As part of potential highspeed rail on the neighboring railway, its historical significance was evaluated in a 2018 report and recommended the site as likely eligible for inclusion in the National Register of Historic Places. No known stone mills survive in Alexandria's original boundaries, and Phoenix Mill is the only such mill in the current Alexandria after Alexandria annexed the land.
