= Weisenberger Mills and Related Buildings =

- U.S. National Register of Historic Places
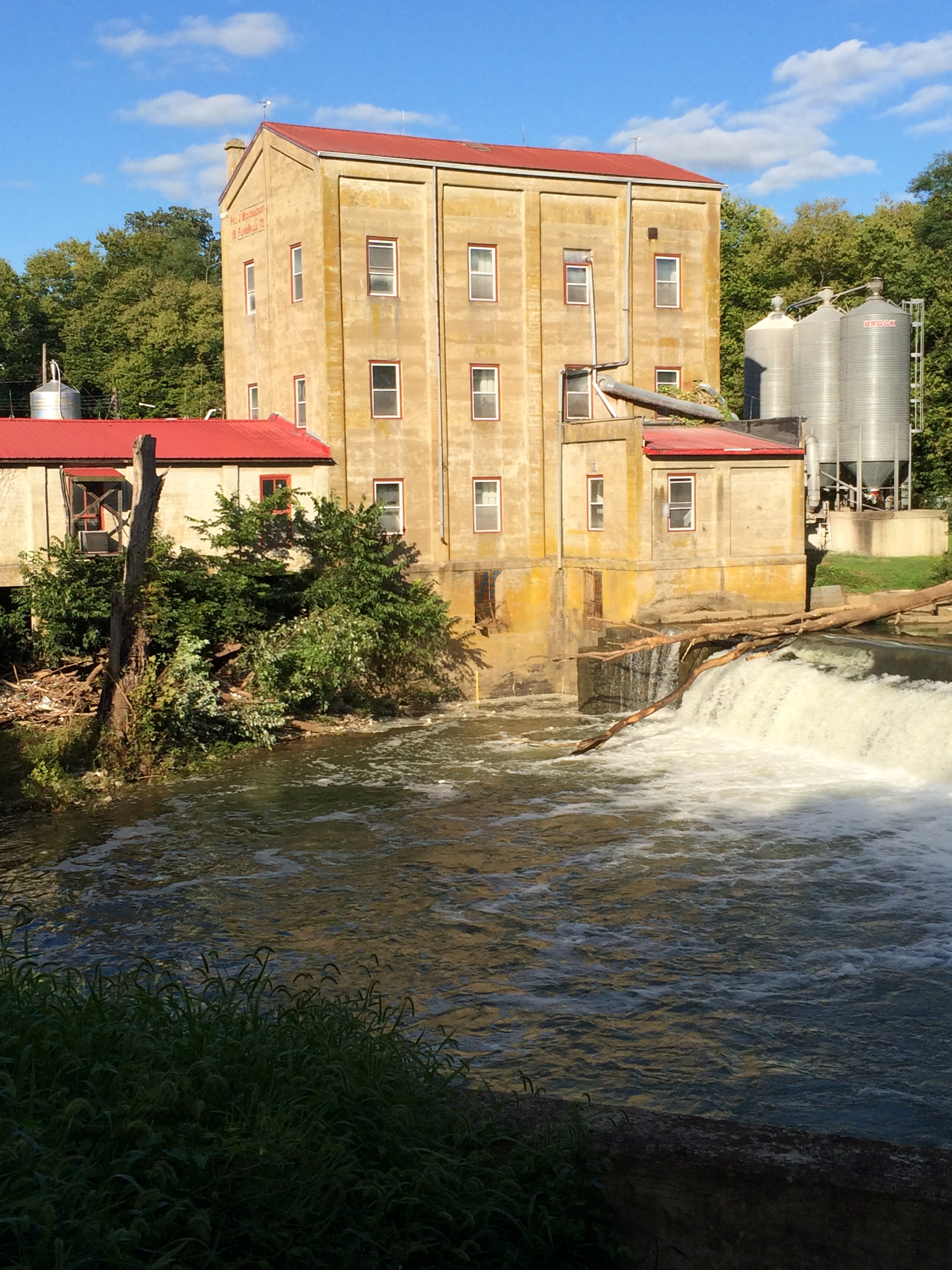

- Location within Kentucky Location within the United States
- Location: 2545 Weisenberger Mill Road, Midway, Kentucky
- Coordinates: 38°07′34″N 84°38′13″W
- Area: 87 acres (35 ha)
- Built: 1913
- Built by: Weisenberger, Phil J.; Weisenberger, Augustus
- Website: weisenberger.com
- NRHP reference No.: 84001987
- Added to NRHP: August 16, 1984

Weisenberger Mills is the oldest continuously operating grain mill in Kentucky. Located about 3 miles (4.8 km) east of Midway, Kentucky, the property straddles Scott and Woodford counties, and the mill is located on the banks of South Elkhorn Creek with a milldam which provides the water to power the mill.

Augustus Weisenberger purchased the property with mill in 1865. The current mill building was built in 1913 to replace the old 1818 stone one. The complex includes a 20-foot wheelhouse and a 1904 20,000 bushel ironclad grain elevator.

The mill property and related buildings were listed on the National Register of Historic Places in 1984, including 14 contributing buildings and two contributing structures on 87 acres (35 ha).

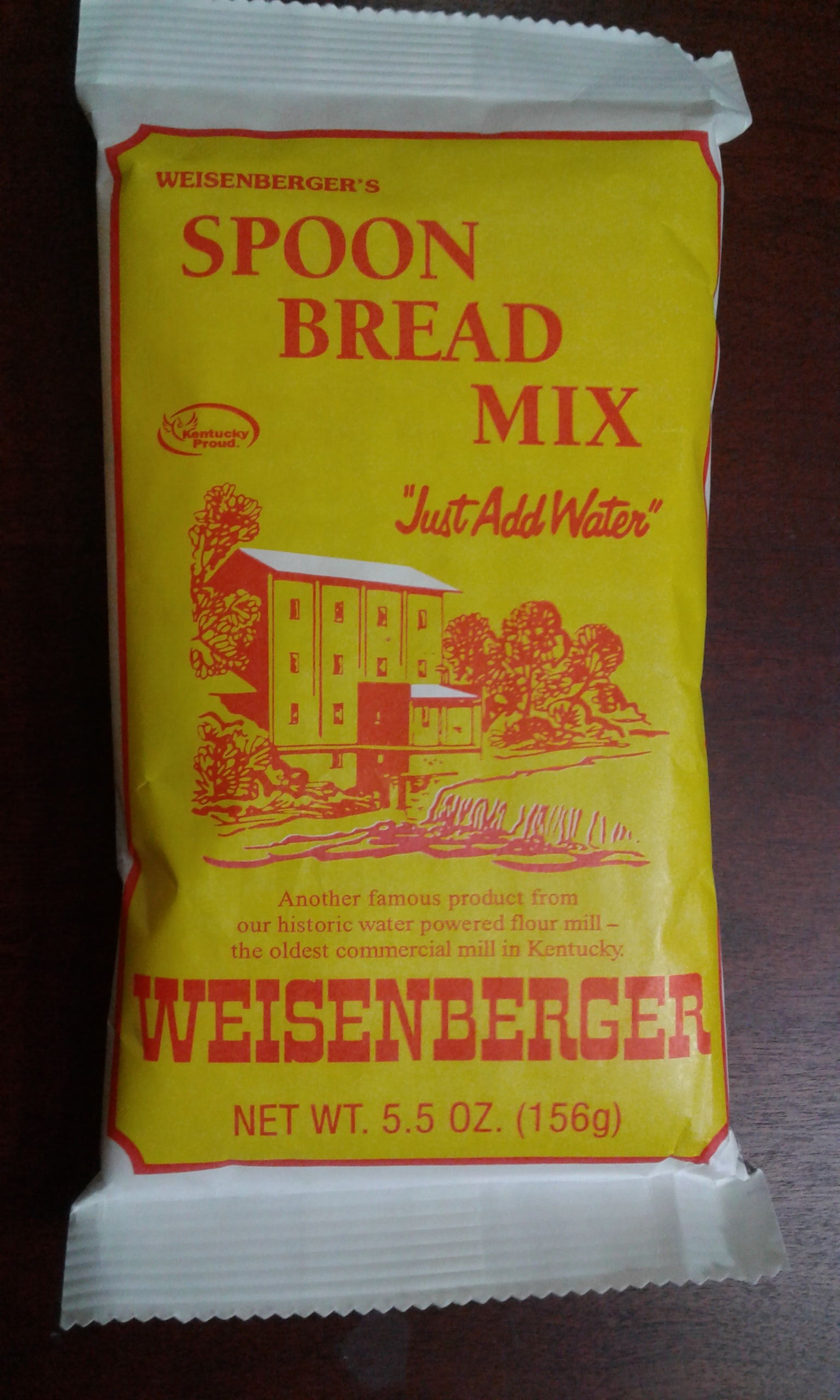
Weisenberger Mills product packaging showing mill building and milldam

As of 2023, the water-powered mill has been operated as a family business since the 1860s by six generations of Weisenbergers. The mill produces flour, meal, feed and baking mixes which are shipped throughout the country. All of their grains are sourced locally, within 100 miles.

== Power generation ==
Prior to the construction of the 1913 building, the gristmill was powered by a water wheel. The 1913 building was constructed with a twin-turbine electric generator, powered by the river's water. With expansion of equipment over the years, the mill had to supplement their power needs by purchasing electricity from the local utility.

Working again with the consultant who had worked on the turbines in the 1980s, and the Center for Applied Energy Research at the University of Kentucky, Weisenberger Mills received a $56,000 grant from the US Department of Energy to install a variable speed generator like is commonly used in the wind turbine industry but which hadn't yet been tried in the hydroelectric industry.

"[It] actually worked much better than we were expecting. We were expecting to get 10 to 15 percent more power out of this new generation, and we're actually getting 96 percent more power out of it. One of the reasons that we found out was that the old generator was operating at the wrong speed. It was running too fast. By slowing the generator down, we're able to get the turbine into a much more optimal efficiency range. And by doing that we're able to get the power output up significantly. Close to doubling the power output."

— David Brown Kinloch of Shaker Landing Hydro Associates

In 2017, mill owner Mac Weisenberger said that energy they generate but don't use will go back into the electric grid. The success of the new system has resulted in four similar projects at larger hydroelectric plants on the Kentucky River.
