= Rhodes Mill =

- U.S. National Register of Historic Places
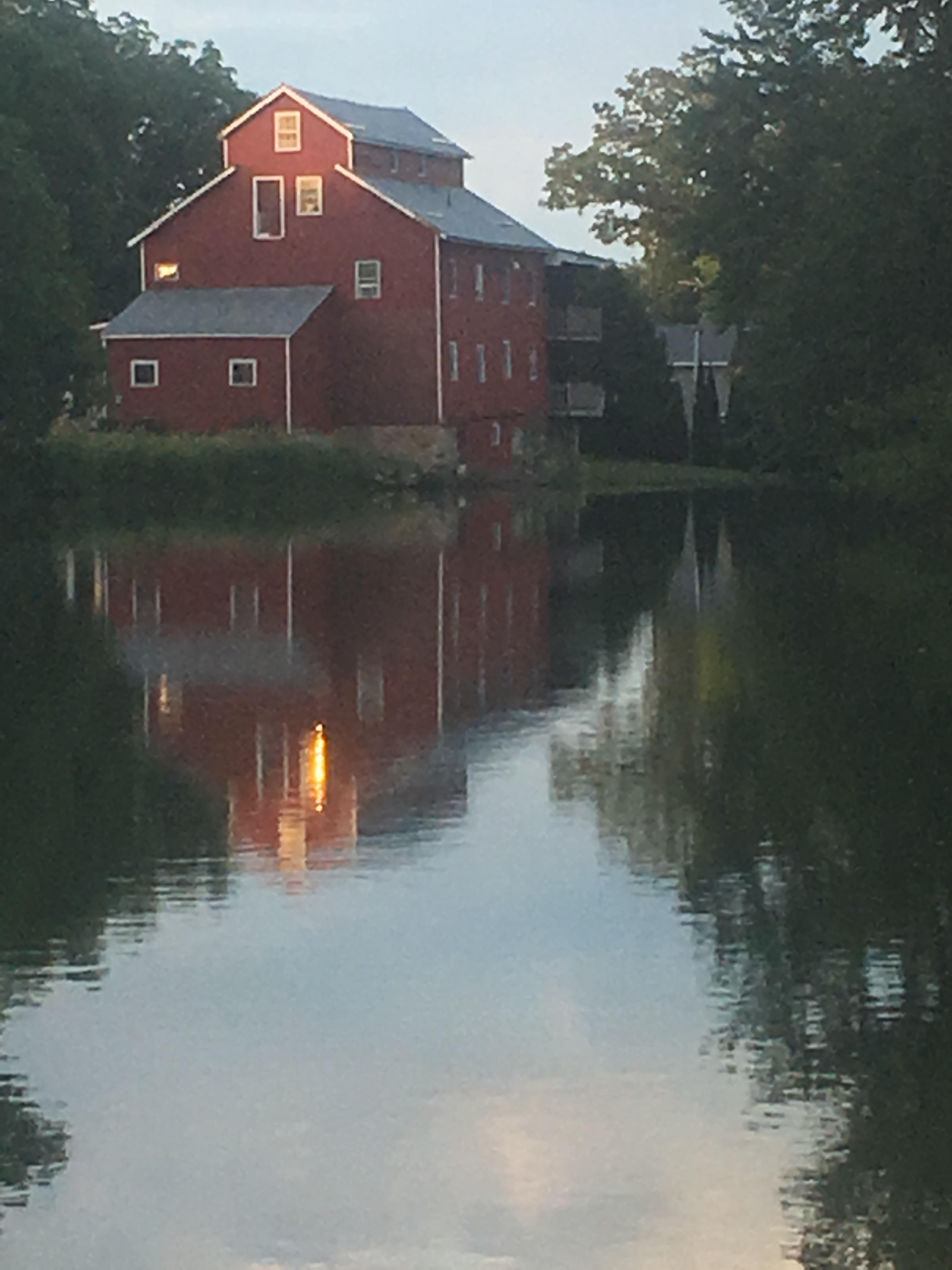

- Location within Iowa Location within the United States
- Location: Main St. Fertile, Iowa
- Coordinates: 43°15′50″N 93°25′16″W
- Area: less than one acre
- Built: 1868
- Architect: William Rhodes
- NRHP reference No.: 78001274
- Added to NRHP: November 24, 1978

Rhodes Mill is a historic structure located in Fertile, Iowa, United States. It was listed on the National Register of Historic Places in 1978. William Rhodes moved to Fertile Township in Worth County, Iowa from Ontario in 1856. The following year he opened a saw mill along what is now known as the Winnebago River. During the American Civil War he enlisted in the 32nd Iowa Infantry. After he was discharged in 1865 the town of Fertile grew around his mill. Iowa's wheat production increased after the war. Rhodes built a flour mill on the same site in 1868. It had a capacity of 50 barrels of flour per day, and by 1884 he was doing around $10,000 worth of business a year. He and his son remained in business until 1918.

The mill itself is a 2½-story, rectangular, frame structure built on a rubblestone foundation. The building originally measured 42 by 34 feet (13 by 10 m). It was extended to a length of 56 feet (17 m) when a two-story residential space was added. A small shed was added to the facility in 1919, and a concrete dam was built across the river in 1929.
