= Fairhaven, Frederick County, Maryland =

Unincorporated community in Maryland, U.S.

Coordinates: 39°32′23″N 77°15′24″W

Fairhaven is an unincorporated community in Frederick County, Maryland, United States.
