= Fairhaven, Carroll County, Maryland =

Unincorporated community in Maryland, U.S.

Coordinates: 39°22′38″N 76°58′17″W

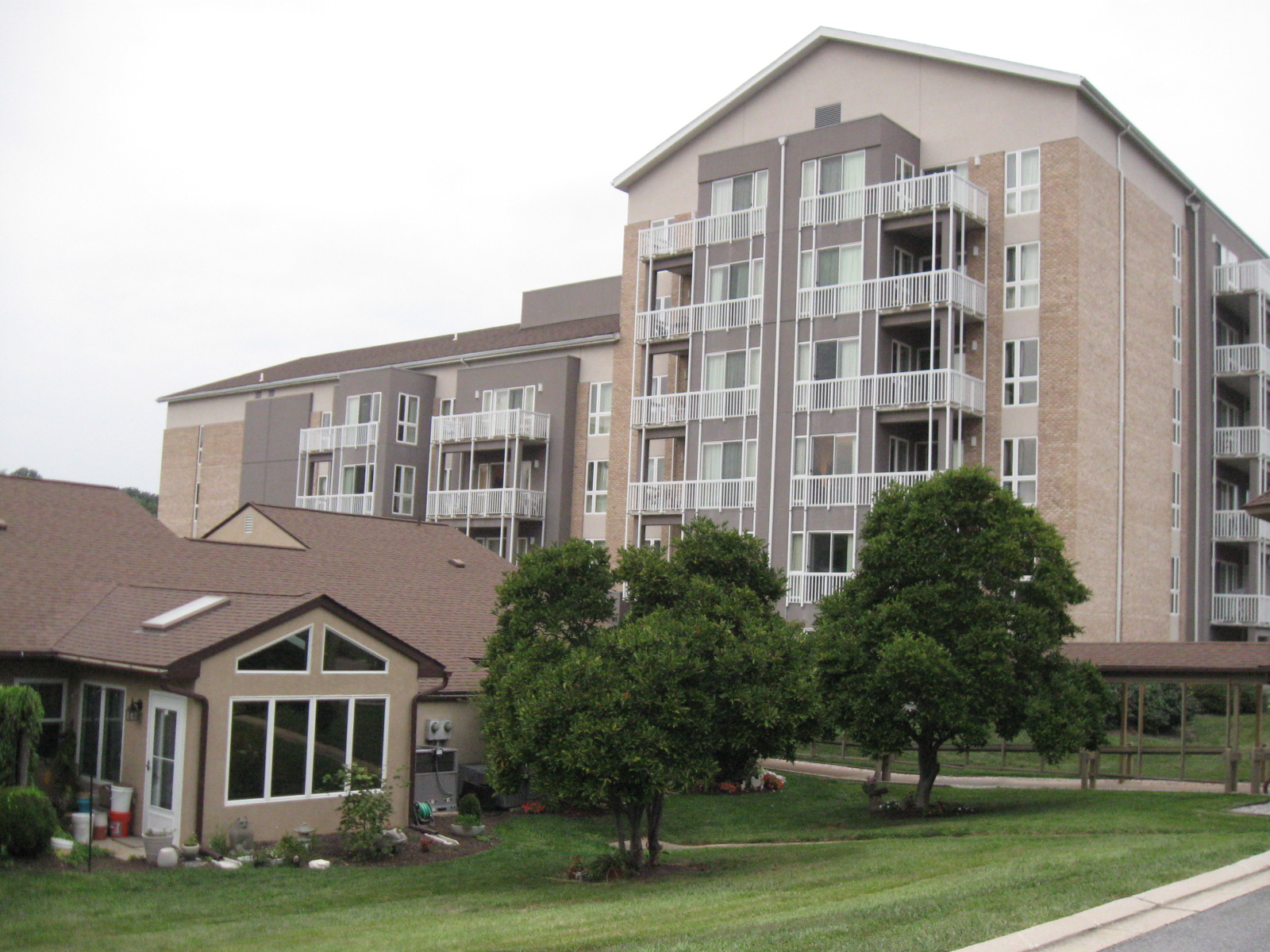
Fairhaven retirement community

Fairhaven is an unincorporated community retirement community in Carroll County, Maryland, United States.
