= Fought's Mill =

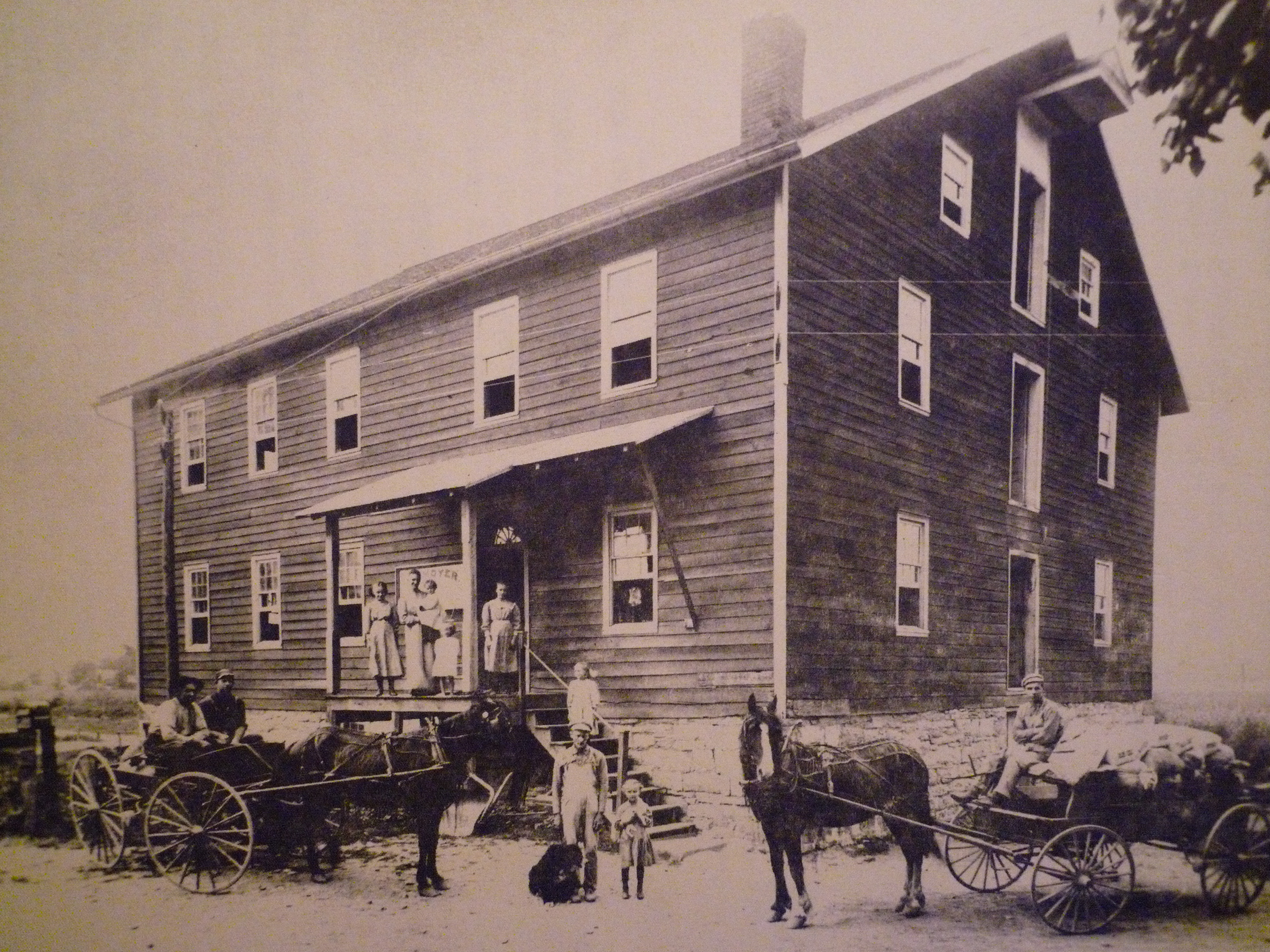
- Fought's Mill in 1909. Isaac Allen Moyer, standing in center in overalls, was the 8th owner of the mill.

- Location within Pennsylvania

General information
- Type: Gristmill
- Location: West Buffalo Township, Union County, Pennsylvania
- Coordinates: 40.92101°N 77.03889°W

Fought's Mill was a gristmill built by Jacob Fought in 1771 in West Buffalo Township, Union County, Pennsylvania. The mill operated on water received from two dams that had been built on Buffalo Creek. This water power was used to unload the grain from the wagons and raise it to the first and second floor levels by rope and pulley. The grain was then ground between two millstones, which were ridged on the joining sides, to make flour, cornmeal, and feed for livestock. During extremely cold conditions, the mill would be operated during the day and night, to prevent the water from freezing. The mill remained powered by water until the 9th owner, who bought the mill in 1925, converted it to diesel power.

During the Revolutionary days, the mill was used as a refuge for the settlers against Indians. It also was the location of Buffalo Valley's first election under the Pennsylvania Constitution of 1776, being held on November 3, 1776.

On September 22, 1947, a Pennsylvania State Historical Marker was dedicated at the site of the mill.

In September 1971, the mill was completely destroyed by fire. Two teenagers were charged with arson after they started the fire in a load of hay which stood on the scales by the side of the mill.
