= Woodson's Mill =

- U.S. National Register of Historic Places
- Virginia Landmarks Register
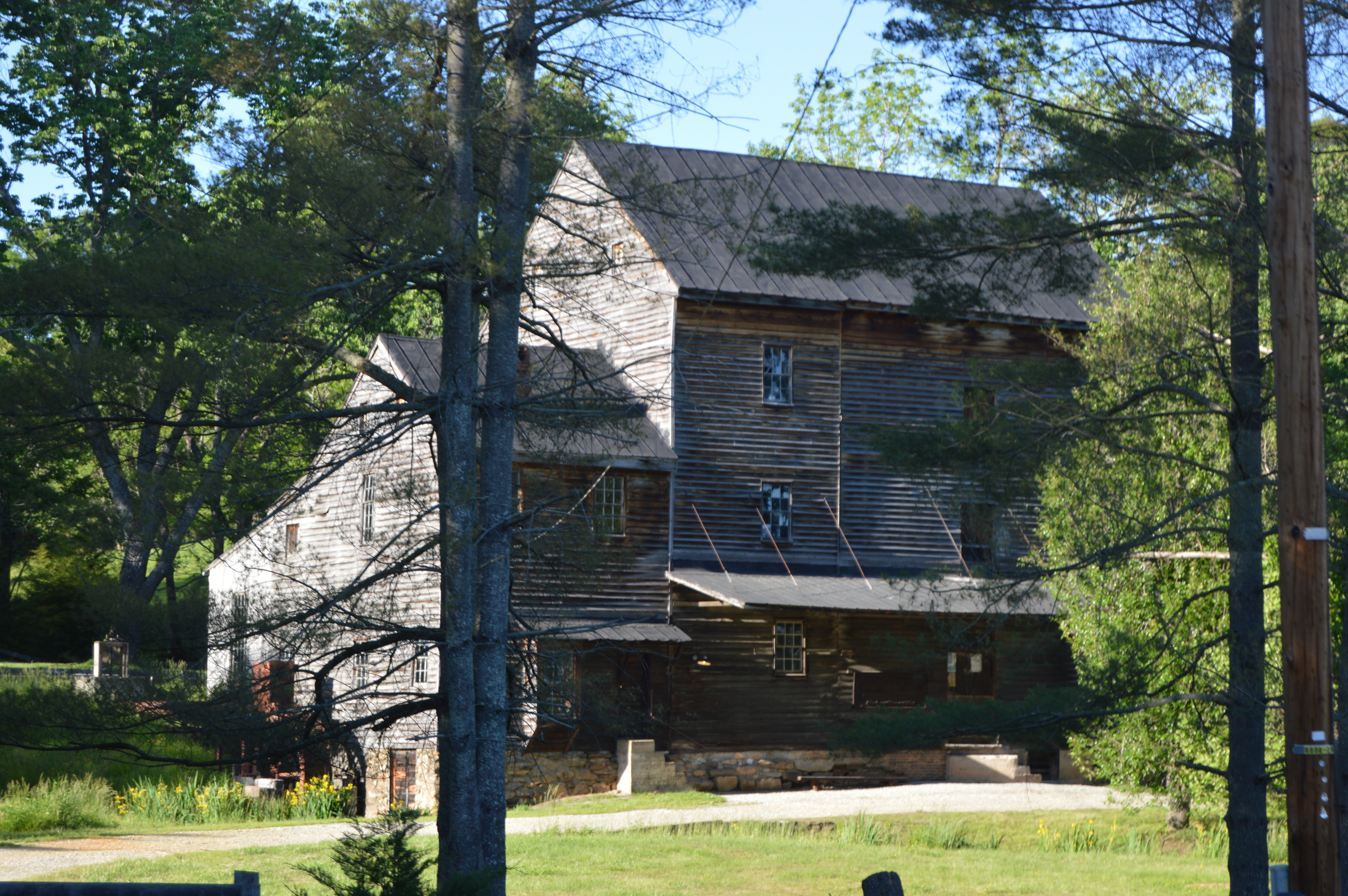
- Western side and front

- Location within Virginia Location within the United States
- Location: State Route 778 E of jct. with State Route 666, near Lowesville, Virginia
- Coordinates: 37°43′15″N 79°3′49″W
- Built: 1825
- NRHP reference No.: 92001703
- VLR No.: 062-0093

Significant dates
- Added to NRHP: December 17, 1992
- Designated VLR: October 21, 1992

Woodson's Mill, also known as Piney River Mill, is a historic grist mill located at Lowesville, Nelson County, Virginia. It is believed to have been built originally for Guiliford Campbell in 1794. The present building has undergone three periods of structural and mechanical improvements, most of which date to the nineteenth century. Sometime after 1900, Dr. Julian B. Woodson added a sophisticated roller mill system for the production of fine white flour and he built his office into the west end of the mill. The mill continues to function with two water wheels and houses an operating cider press.

It was listed on the National Register of Historic Places in 1992.
