= Fair Haven Township, Stearns County, Minnesota =

Fair Haven Township, Minnesota
- Township
- Location within the state of Minnesota Fair Haven Township, Minnesota (the United States)
- Coordinates: 45°21′N 94°12′W
- Country: United States
- State: Minnesota
- County: Stearns

Area
  - Total: 35.8 sq mi (92.8 km^{2})
  - Land: 34.0 sq mi (88.1 km^{2})
  - Water: 1.8 sq mi (4.7 km^{2})
- Elevation: 1,073 ft (327 m)

Population (2010)
  - Total: 1,507
  - Density: 44.3/sq mi (17.1/km^{2})
- Time zone: UTC-6 (Central (CST))
  - Summer (DST): UTC-5 (CDT)
- FIPS code: 27-20294
- GNIS feature ID: 0664132
- Website: https://fairhaventwpmn.com/

Fair Haven Township is a township in Stearns County, Minnesota, United States. The population was 1,507 at the 2010 census. The unincorporated community of Fairhaven is located within Fair Haven Township.

Fair Haven Township was organized in 1859, and was descriptively named by first settlers.

== Geography ==
According to the United States Census Bureau, the township has a total area of 35.8 square miles (93 km^{2}); 34.0 square miles (88 km^{2}) is land and 1.8 square miles (4.7 km^{2}), or 5.08%, is water.

Fairhaven Township is located in Townships 121 and 122 North of the Arkansas Base Line and Range 28 West of the 5th Principal Meridian.

== Demographics ==
As of the census of 2000, there were 1,458 people, 510 households, and 401 families residing in the township. The population density was 42.9 inhabitants per square mile (16.6/km^{2}). There were 596 housing units at an average density of 17.5 per square mile (6.8/km^{2}). The racial makeup of the township was 98.77% White, 0.41% African American, 0.62% Native American, 0.07% Asian, and 0.14% from two or more races. Hispanic or Latino of any race were 0.55% of the population.

There were 510 households, out of which 40.4% had children under the age of 18 living with them, 69.2% were married couples living together, 5.5% had a female householder with no husband present, and 21.2% were non-families. 18.0% of all households were made up of individuals, and 7.1% had someone living alone who was 65 years of age or older. The average household size was 2.86 and the average family size was 3.24.

In the township the population was spread out, with 30.0% under the age of 18, 7.3% from 18 to 24, 29.8% from 25 to 44, 23.5% from 45 to 64, and 9.3% who were 65 years of age or older. The median age was 36 years. For every 100 females, there were 107.7 males. For every 100 females age 18 and over, there were 113.6 males.

The median income for a household in the township was $44,808, and the median income for a family was $52,000. Males had a median income of $36,667 versus $22,500 for females. The per capita income for the township was $17,951. About 4.7% of families and 6.1% of the population were below the poverty line, including 7.4% of those under age 18 and 6.7% of those age 65 or over.
