= Milltown, New Jersey =

Borough in Middlesex County, New Jersey, US

- Borough
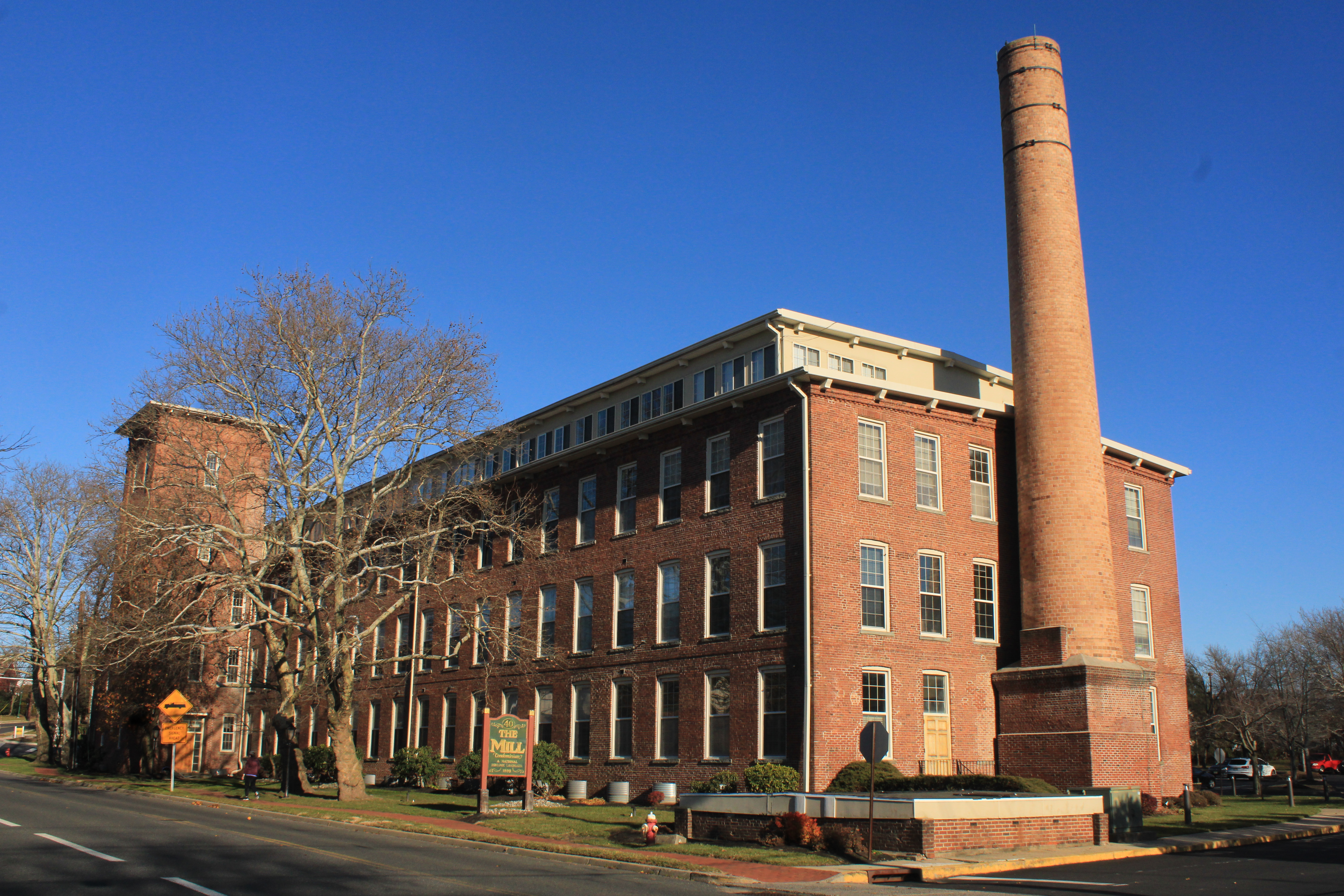
- The historic Milltown India Rubber Factory, now converted to condominiums

- Seal

- Location of Milltown in Middlesex County highlighted in red (left). Inset map: Location of Middlesex County in New Jersey highlighted in orange (right).

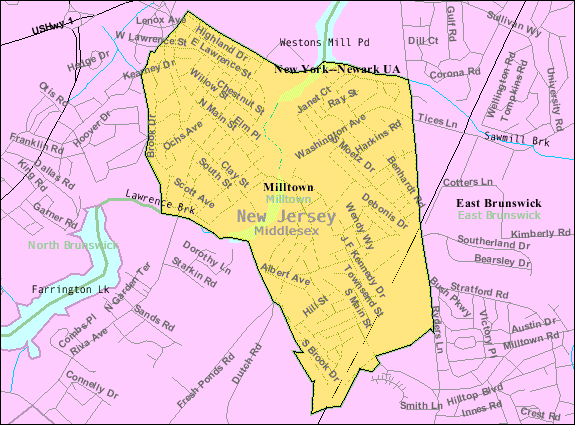
- Census Bureau map of Milltown, New Jersey
- Interactive map of Milltown, New Jersey
- Location in Middlesex County Location in New Jersey Location in the United States
- Coordinates: 40.450223°N 74.434786°W
- Country: United States
- State: New Jersey
- County: Middlesex
- Incorporated: January 29, 1889

Government
  - Type: Borough
  - Body: Borough Council
  - Mayor: George Murray (R, term ends December 31, 2027)
  - Municipal clerk: Gretchen McCarthy

Area
  - Total: 1.59 sq mi (4.13 km^{2})
  - Land: 1.55 sq mi (4.02 km^{2})
  - Water: 0.042 sq mi (0.11 km^{2}) 2.56%
  - Rank: 441st of 565 in state 22nd of 25 in county
- Elevation: 36 ft (11 m)

Population (2020)
  - Total: 7,037
  - Estimate (2023): 6,968
  - Rank: 317th of 565 in state 22nd of 25 in county
  - Density: 4,528.3/sq mi (1,748.4/km^{2})
  - Rank: 129th of 565 in state 10th of 25 in county
- Time zone: UTC−05:00 (Eastern (EST))
  - Summer (DST): UTC−04:00 (Eastern (EDT))
- ZIP Code: 08850
- Area code: 732
- FIPS code: 3402346620
- GNIS feature ID: 0885303
- Website: www.milltownnj.org

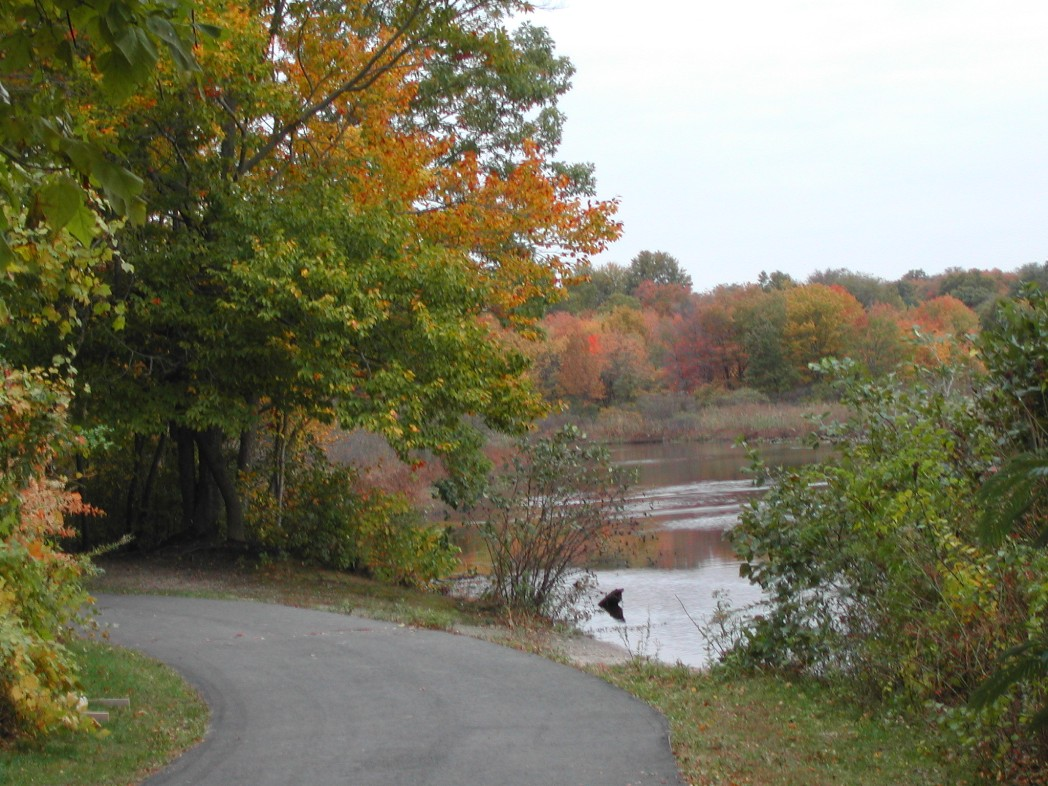
The Mill Pond path

Milltown is a borough in Middlesex County, in the U.S. state of New Jersey. The borough is nestled within the heart of the Raritan Valley region, with Lawrence Brook (a Raritan river tributary) flowing through the center of the community. As of the 2020 United States census, the borough's population was 7,037, an increase of 144 (+2.1%) from the 2010 census count of 6,893, which in turn reflected a decrease of 107 (−1.5%) from the 7,000 counted in the 2000 census.

Milltown was incorporated as a borough by an act of the New Jersey Legislature on January 29, 1889, from portions of North Brunswick, based on the results of a referendum held three days earlier. The borough was reincorporated by resolution of the borough council on May 2, 1896. A portion of East Brunswick Township was annexed in 1902. Originally known as Bergen's Mill, named for Jacob I. Bergen who owned the grist mill, the name is believed to have become "Milltown" from residents "going to the mill in town".

As of the 2000 Census, the center of population for New Jersey was located in Milltown, at Milltown Road, just east of the New Jersey Turnpike (see map of location). Based on the results of the 2010 census, the center of population had shifted to East Brunswick.

== History ==
Long before the arrival of the first Europeans, the Lenape Native Americans had established settlements along the Lawrence Brook. The discovery of many artifacts in the area above today's municipal building (now a small county park) suggests the presence of a Native American settlement. In 1678, Thomas Lawrence, a New York baker, acquired a large area around the Lawrence Brook, which likely included today's Milltown. The Lawrence Brook was then called Piscopeek (and on later maps, Lawrence's Brook). The names and marks of several Native Americans (Quemareck, Quesiacs, Isarick, Metapis, Peckawan and Turantaca) appear on the bill of sale. In 1769, Fulcard Van Nordstrand advertised the sale of a large gristmill on the bank of Lawrence Brook. It would soon be called Lawrence Brook Mill. The 1903 classic western film The Great Train Robbery was shot in Milltown.

After the end of World War I, the Michelin Illustrated Guides to the Battlefields (1914-1918) of the Western Front were published in Milltown.

Milltown was home to a large French community, about 3,000 of whom worked at the Michelin tire factory. Many hailed from Gourin, and spoke Breton.

In March 2010, the Milltown Borough Council voted against changing the name of Petain Avenue, citing the difficulties that the street's residents would endure if the name changed. Petain Avenue is named for Philippe Pétain, a French World War I general who became the leader of the Vichy France government during World War II. The Vichy Regime willfully collaborated with Nazi Germany, taking state action against "undesirables", including Jews, Protestants, gays, gypsies, and left-wing activists. In total, the Vichy government participated in the deportation of 76,000 Jews to German extermination camps, although this number varies depending on the account; only 2,500 survived the war. After the war, Petain was charged with perjury and sentenced to death, though this was commuted to life imprisonment due to his advanced age. By contrast, in France itself, the French government has since changed the name of every street formerly named after Petain. The road was eventually renamed as an extension of Haig Avenue in 2024.

The groundbreaking anxiolytic and sedative drug Miltown (meprobamate) developed by Carter Products, which became available to the public in the mid-1950s, was named for the borough.

After the death of Milltown Mel in 2021, who had been featured at Groundhog Day events that drew as many as a thousand spectators, a bill was passed by the legislature to allow groundhogs to be purchased from outside the state, but the bill was vetoed in January 2026 by Governor Phil Murphy over concerns that the imported animals might have rabies.

== Geography ==
According to the United States Census Bureau, the borough had a total area of 1.60 square miles (4.13 km^{2}), including 1.55 square miles (4.02 km^{2}) of land and 0.04 square miles (0.11 km^{2}) of water (2.56%).

The borough borders North Brunswick to the west and East Brunswick to the east.

The Lawrence Brook, a tributary of the Raritan River, flows through the borough after exiting the Farrington Lake; a dam, under Main Street, creates a reservoir, the Mill Pond. The brook's watershed covers 48 square miles (120 km^{2}) that includes Milltown and East Brunswick, New Brunswick, North Brunswick and South Brunswick.

=== Climate ===
The climate in the area is characterized by hot, humid summers and generally cold winters. According to the Köppen Climate Classification system, Milltown has a humid continental climate, abbreviated "Dfa" on climate maps.

== Demographics ==
Historical population
Census	Pop.	Note	%±
1900	561		—
1910	1,584		182.4%
1920	2,573		62.4%
1930	2,994		16.4%
1940	3,515		17.4%
1950	3,786		7.7%
1960	5,435		43.6%
1970	6,470		19.0%
1980	7,136		10.3%
1990	6,968		−2.4%
2000	7,000		0.5%
2010	6,893		−1.5%
2020	7,037		2.1%
2023 (est.)	6,968	▼	−1.0%
Population sources: 1900–1920; 1900–1910 1910–1930 1940–2000; 2000 2010 2020

=== 2020 census ===
As of the 2020 census, Milltown had a population of 7,037. The median age was 41.2 years. 22.4% of residents were under the age of 18 and 16.8% of residents were 65 years of age or older. For every 100 females there were 94.0 males, and for every 100 females age 18 and over there were 91.4 males age 18 and over.

100.0% of residents lived in urban areas, while 0.0% lived in rural areas.

There were 2,613 households in Milltown, of which 35.1% had children under the age of 18 living in them. Of all households, 59.2% were married-couple households, 13.0% were households with a male householder and no spouse or partner present, and 22.8% were households with a female householder and no spouse or partner present. About 20.6% of all households were made up of individuals and 8.7% had someone living alone who was 65 years of age or older.

There were 2,707 housing units, of which 3.5% were vacant. The homeowner vacancy rate was 1.0% and the rental vacancy rate was 1.3%.

Racial composition as of the 2020 census
Race	Number	Percent
White	5,740	81.6%
Black or African American	191	2.7%
American Indian and Alaska Native	18	0.3%
Asian	259	3.7%
Native Hawaiian and Other Pacific Islander	1	0.0%
Some other race	281	4.0%
Two or more races	547	7.8%
Hispanic or Latino (of any race)	810	11.5%

=== 2010 census ===
The 2010 United States census counted 6,893 people, 2,599 households, and 1,915 families in the borough. The population density was 4,443.0 per square mile (1,715.5/km^{2}). There were 2,698 housing units at an average density of 1,739.0 per square mile (671.4/km^{2}). The racial makeup was 92.44% (6,372) White, 1.23% (85) Black or African American, 0.13% (9) Native American, 3.37% (232) Asian, 0.00% (0) Pacific Islander, 1.58% (109) from other races, and 1.25% (86) from two or more races. Hispanic or Latino of any race were 6.46% (445) of the population.

Of the 2,599 households, 31.1% had children under the age of 18; 60.9% were married couples living together; 9.3% had a female householder with no husband present and 26.3% were non-families. Of all households, 20.7% were made up of individuals and 8.6% had someone living alone who was 65 years of age or older. The average household size was 2.65 and the average family size was 3.10.

21.8% of the population were under the age of 18, 7.3% from 18 to 24, 26.0% from 25 to 44, 30.1% from 45 to 64, and 14.8% who were 65 years of age or older. The median age was 41.6 years. For every 100 females, the population had 97.1 males. For every 100 females ages 18 and older there were 93.5 males.

The Census Bureau's 2006–2010 American Community Survey showed that (in 2010 inflation-adjusted dollars) median household income was $89,457 (with a margin of error of +/− $14,398) and the median family income was $103,750 (+/− $7,631). Males had a median income of $63,377 (+/− $5,321) versus $41,029 (+/− $3,358) for females. The per capita income for the borough was $33,472 (+/− $2,034). About 2.9% of families and 3.0% of the population were below the poverty line, including 3.9% of those under age 18 and 5.3% of those age 65 or over.

=== 2000 census ===
As of the 2000 United States census there were 7,000 people, 2,627 households, and 1,943 families residing in the borough. The population density was 4,452.0 inhabitants per square mile (1,718.9/km^{2}). There were 2,670 housing units at an average density of 1,698.1 per square mile (655.6/km^{2}). The racial makeup of the borough was 93.86% White, 0.76% African American, 0.16% Native American, 3.07% Asian, 1.16% from other races, and 1.00% from two or more races. Hispanic or Latino of any race were 3.73% of the population.

There were 2,627 households, out of which 31.7% had children under the age of 18 living with them, 60.9% were married couples living together, 9.9% had a female householder with no husband present, and 26.0% were non-families. 21.4% of all households were made up of individuals, and 9.7% had someone living alone who was 65 years of age or older. The average household size was 2.66 and the average family size was 3.12.

In the borough the population was spread out, with 22.9% under the age of 18, 6.8% from 18 to 24, 29.5% from 25 to 44, 25.1% from 45 to 64, and 15.7% who were 65 years of age or older. The median age was 40 years. For every 100 females, there were 93.2 males. For every 100 females age 18 and over, there were 90.2 males.

The median income for a household in the borough was $68,429, and the median income for a family was $77,869. Males had a median income of $50,338 versus $38,220 for females. The per capita income for the borough was $29,996. About 1.3% of families and 2.3% of the population were below the poverty line, including 3.3% of those under age 18 and 1.3% of those age 65 or over.

== Government ==
=== Local government ===
Milltown is governed under the borough form of New Jersey municipal government, which is used in 218 municipalities (of the 564) statewide, making it the most common form of government in New Jersey. The governing body is comprised of the mayor and the borough council, with all positions elected at-large on a partisan basis as part of the November general election. A mayor is elected directly by the voters to a four-year term of office. The borough council includes six members elected to serve three-year terms on a staggered basis, with two seats coming up for election each year in a three-year cycle.The borough form of government used by Milltown is a "weak mayor / strong council" government in which council members act as the legislative body with the mayor presiding at meetings and voting only in the event of a tie. The mayor can veto ordinances subject to an override by a two-thirds majority vote of the council. The mayor makes committee and liaison assignments for council members, and most appointments are made by the mayor with the advice and consent of the council.

As of 2026, the mayor of Milltown is Republican George Murray, whose term of office ends December 31, 2027. Members of the Milltown Borough Council are Frank Manco (R, 2026), Deborah A. Miller (R, 2028), Gary Posnansky (R, 2026), Patricia Payne (D, 2027), David Potter (D, 2027) and Felipe "Phil" Zambrana (D, 2028).

=== Federal, state and county representation ===
Milltown is located in the 12th Congressional District and is part of New Jersey's 18th state legislative district.

For the 119th United States Congress, New Jersey's 12th congressional district is represented by Bonnie Watson Coleman (D, Ewing Township). New Jersey is represented in the United States Senate by Democrats Cory Booker (Newark, term ends 2027) and Andy Kim (Moorestown, term ends 2031).

For the 2026–2027 session, the 18th legislative district of the New Jersey Legislature is represented in the State Senate by Patrick J. Diegnan (D, South Plainfield) and in the General Assembly by Robert Karabinchak (D, Edison) and Sterley Stanley (D, East Brunswick).

Middlesex County is governed by a Board of County Commissioners, whose seven members are elected at-large on a partisan basis to serve three-year terms of office on a staggered basis, with either two or three seats coming up for election each year as part of the November general election. At an annual reorganization meeting held in January, the board selects from among its members a commissioner director and deputy director. As of 2025, Middlesex County's Commissioners (with party affiliation, term-end year, and residence listed in parentheses) are:

Director Ronald G. Rios (D, Carteret, 2027), Deputy Director Shanti Narra (D, North Brunswick, 2027), Claribel A. "Clary" Azcona-Barber (D, New Brunswick, 2025), Charles Kenny (D, Woodbridge Township, 2025), Leslie Koppel (D, Monroe Township, 2026), Chanelle Scott McCullum (D, Piscataway, 2025) and Charles E. Tomaro (D, Edison, 2026).

Constitutional officers are: Clerk Nancy Pinkin (D, 2025, East Brunswick), Sheriff Mildred S. Scott (D, 2025, Piscataway) and Surrogate Claribel Cortes (D, 2026; North Brunswick).

=== Politics ===
As of March 2011, there were a total of 5,075 registered voters in Milltown, of which 1,609 (31.7%) were registered as Democrats, 823 (16.2%) were registered as Republicans and 2,643 (52.1%) were registered as Unaffiliated. There were no voters registered to other parties.

United States presidential election results for Milltown
Year	Republican		Democratic		Third party(ies)	
Year	No.	%	No.	%	No.	%
2024	2,134	52.47%	1,839	45.22%	94	2.31%
2020	2,135	50.46%	2,043	48.29%	53	1.25%
2016	2,076	54.40%	1,580	41.40%	160	4.19%
2012	1,828	49.88%	1,784	48.68%	53	1.45%
2008	2,112	52.47%	1,848	45.91%	65	1.61%
2004	2,181	55.81%	1,683	43.07%	44	1.13%
2000	1,709	46.83%	1,787	48.97%	153	4.19%

In the 2020 presidential election, Republican Donald J. Trump received 50% of the vote (2,135 cast), ahead of Democrat Joseph Biden with 47.8% (2,043 votes), and other candidates with 1.4% (53 votes), among the 4,344 ballots cast by the borough's 5,569 registered voters, for a turnout of 78%. In the 2012 presidential election, Republican Mitt Romney received 49.9% of the vote (1,828 cast), ahead of Democrat Barack Obama with 48.7% (1,784 votes), and other candidates with 1.4% (53 votes), among the 3,706 ballots cast by the borough's 5,159 registered voters (41 ballots were spoiled), for a turnout of 71.8%. In the 2008 presidential election, Republican John McCain received 52.0% of the vote (2,112 cast), ahead of Democrat Barack Obama with 45.5% (1,848 votes) and other candidates with 1.6% (65 votes), among the 4,058 ballots cast by the borough's 5,250 registered voters, for a turnout of 77.3%.

Gubernatorial election results for Milltown
Year	Republican		Democratic		Third party(ies)	
Year	No.	%	No.	%	No.	%
2025	1,532	47.24%	1,692	52.17%	19	0.59%
2021	1,648	57.14%	1,200	41.61%	36	1.25%
2017	1,326	53.60%	1,076	43.49%	72	2.91%
2013	1,650	64.55%	855	33.45%	51	2.00%
2009	1,684	56.62%	982	33.02%	308	10.36%
2005	1,426	51.00%	1,222	43.71%	148	5.29%

In the 2013 gubernatorial election, Republican Chris Christie received 64.6% of the vote (1,650 cast), ahead of Democrat Barbara Buono with 33.5% (855 votes), and other candidates with 2.0% (51 votes), among the 2,586 ballots cast by the borough's 5,180 registered voters (30 ballots were spoiled), for a turnout of 49.9%. In the 2009 gubernatorial election, Republican Chris Christie received 55.9% of the vote (1,684 ballots cast), ahead of Democrat Jon Corzine with 32.6% (982 votes), Independent Chris Daggett with 8.7% (261 votes) and other candidates with 1.6% (47 votes), among the 3,011 ballots cast by the borough's 5,096 registered voters, yielding a 59.1% turnout.

United States Senate election results for Milltown1
Year	Republican		Democratic		Third party(ies)	
Year	No.	%	No.	%	No.	%
2024	1,964	50.31%	1,831	46.90%	109	2.79%
2018	1,714	53.66%	1,349	42.24%	131	4.10%
2012	1,687	48.26%	1,739	49.74%	70	2.00%
2006	1,384	52.13%	1,172	44.14%	99	3.73%

United States Senate election results for Milltown2
Year	Republican		Democratic		Third party(ies)	
Year	No.	%	No.	%	No.	%
2020	2,090	50.07%	1,977	47.36%	107	2.56%
2014	1,123	51.07%	1,034	47.02%	42	1.91%
2013	778	54.22%	644	44.88%	13	0.91%
2008	1,864	49.44%	1,833	48.62%	73	1.94%

== Education ==
The Milltown Public Schools serves students in public school for pre-kindergarten through eighth grade. As of the 2023–24 school year, the district, comprised of two schools, had an enrollment of 815 students and 76.9 classroom teachers (on an FTE basis), for a student–teacher ratio of 10.6:1. Schools in the district (with 2023–24 enrollment data from the National Center for Education Statistics) are Parkview School with 370 students in grades PreK–3 and Joyce Kilmer School with 436 students in grades 4–8.

For ninth through twelfth grades, public school students attend Spotswood High School in Spotswood as part of a sending/receiving relationship with the Spotswood Public Schools, which also serves students from Helmetta. As of the 2023–24 school year, the high school had an enrollment of 773 students and 57.0 classroom teachers (on an FTE basis), for a student–teacher ratio of 13.6:1.

The community is also served by the Greater Brunswick Charter School, a K–8 charter school serving students from Milltown, Edison, Highland Park and New Brunswick. As of the 2021–22 school year, the school had an enrollment of 399 students and 32.5 classroom teachers (on an FTE basis), for a student–teacher ratio of 12.3:1.

Eighth grade students from all of Middlesex County are eligible to apply to attend the high school programs offered by the Middlesex County Magnet Schools, a county-wide vocational school district that offers full-time career and technical education at its schools in East Brunswick, Edison, Perth Amboy, Piscataway and Woodbridge Township, with no tuition charged to students for attendance.

Our Lady of Lourdes School (PreK–8), which operated under the supervision of Roman Catholic Diocese of Metuchen, closed in June 2013 due to dropping enrollment.

== Transportation ==
=== Roads and highways ===
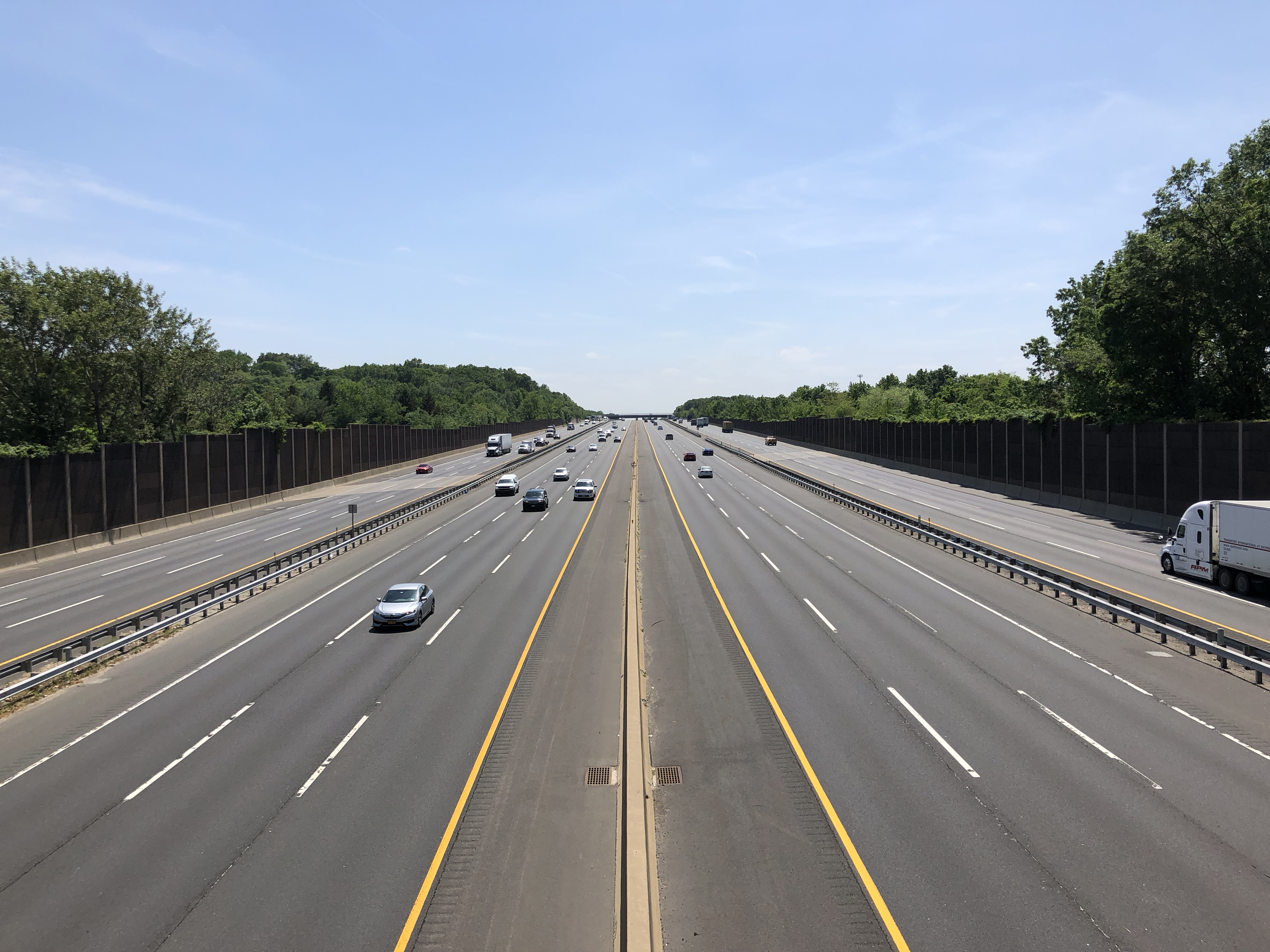
View south along the New New Jersey Turnpike (Interstate 95), the largest and busiest road in Milltown

As of May 2010, the borough had a total of 27.37 miles (44.05 km) of roadways, of which 23.74 miles (38.21 km) were maintained by the municipality, 2.59 miles (4.17 km) by Middlesex County and 1.04 miles (1.67 km) by the New Jersey Turnpike Authority.

Ryders Lane (County Route 617) is a major artery serving the borough along the eastern border. The New Jersey Turnpike (Interstate 95) passes through for about a mile, but the closest interchange is in neighboring East Brunswick. Also, U.S. Route 1 is outside in neighboring North Brunswick.

=== Public transportation ===
On weekdays, NJ Transit provides local bus service on the 811 route.

Coach USA Suburban Transit provides rush-hour commuter service on the 400 route to the Port Authority Bus Terminal in Midtown Manhattan.

The Raritan River Railroad ran through Milltown, but is now defunct along this part of the line. The track and freight station still remain. Proposals have been made to use the line as a light rail route.

== Notable people ==
People who were born in, residents of, or otherwise closely associated with Milltown include:

- J. Edward Crabiel (1916–1992), politician who served in the New Jersey Senate and as New Jersey Secretary of State, until forced to resign
- Josephine Figlo (1923–2011), All-American Girls Professional Baseball League outfielder who played for the Milwaukee Chicks and Racine Belles in 1944
- Joe Gallo (born 1980), college basketball head coach for the Merrimack Warriors men's basketball team
- Al Hermann (1899–1980), Major League Baseball infielder who played for the Boston Braves
- David Kikoski (born 1961), jazz pianist
- Leroy Lins (1913–1986), professional basketball player who played for the Akron Goodyear Wingfoots in the National Basketball League
- Danny Pintauro (born 1976), actor who got started as a child actor on the television soap opera As the World Turns, and in the movie Cujo, and came to prominence on the television series Who's the Boss?
- David Schwendeman (1924–2012), last full-time chief taxidermist of the American Museum of Natural History from 1959 to 1988, who was a lifelong resident of Milltown
- Geno Zimmerlink (born 1963), former American football tight end who played in the National Football League for the Atlanta Falcons
