= New Liberty, Missouri =

Extinct hamlet in Missouri, U.S.

Coordinates: 36°51′52″N 91°16′50″W

New Liberty is an extinct town in northeastern Oregon County, in the U.S. state of Missouri. The GNIS classifies it as a populated place.

A post office called New Liberty was established in 1914, and remained in operation until 1941. Besides the post office, the community had a schoolhouse. The community derives its name from a nearby church of the same name.
