= Fairhaven, Minnesota =

Unincorporated community in Minnesota, US

Fairhaven
- Census-designated place (CDP) and Unincorporated community
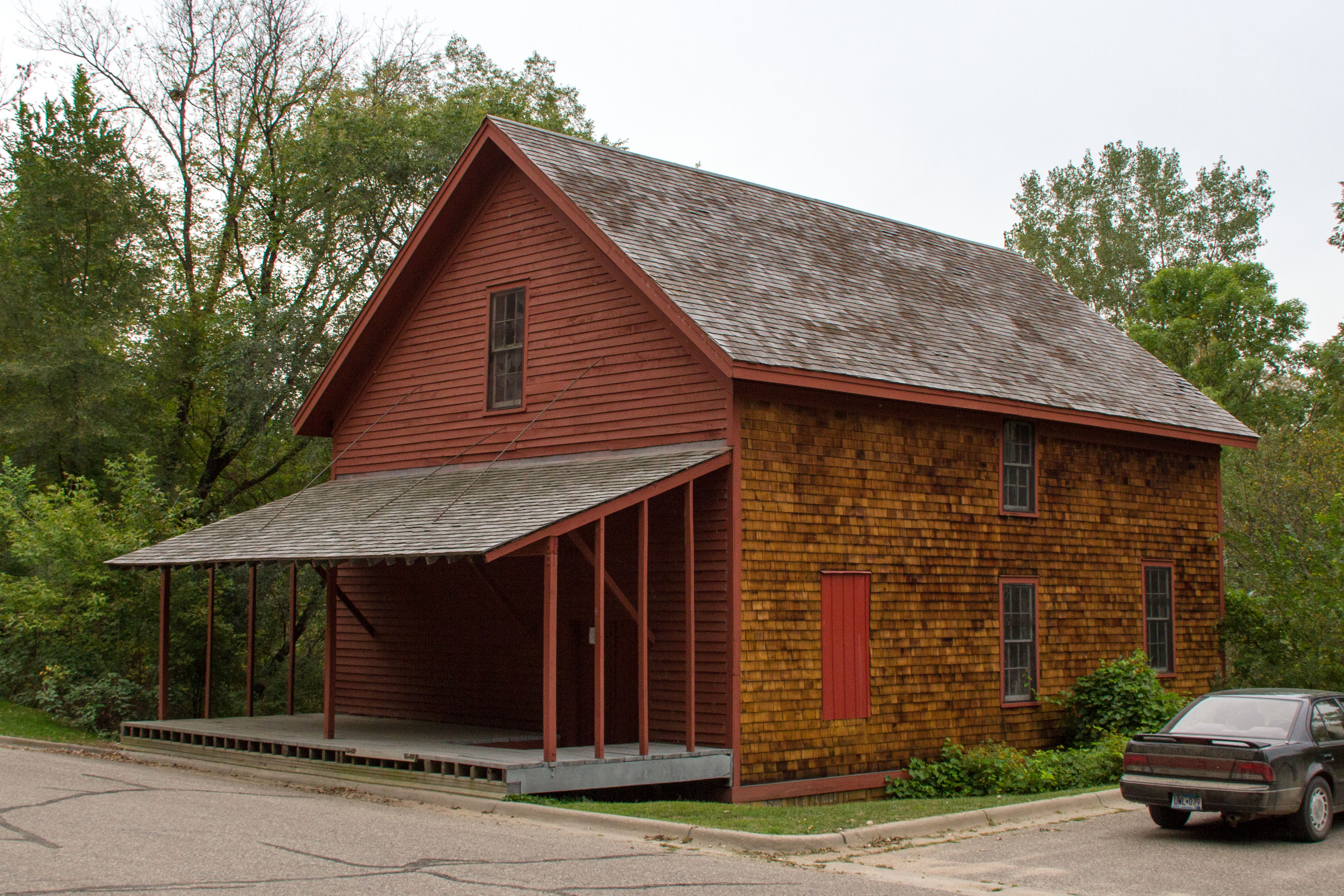
- The 1867 Fair Haven Flour Mill

- Location within Minnesota
- Coordinates: 45°19′24″N 94°12′14″W
- Country: United States
- State: Minnesota
- County: Stearns
- Township: Fair Haven Township

Area
  - Total: 2.05 sq mi (5.32 km^{2})
  - Land: 1.91 sq mi (4.94 km^{2})
  - Water: 0.15 sq mi (0.38 km^{2})
- Elevation: 1,073 ft (327 m)

Population (2020)
  - Total: 392
  - Density: 205.4/sq mi (79.32/km^{2})
- Time zone: UTC-6 (Central (CST))
  - Summer (DST): UTC-5 (CDT)
- ZIP code: 55382
- Area code: 320
- GNIS feature ID: 2628676

Fairhaven is an unincorporated community and census-designated place (CDP) in Fair Haven Township, Stearns County, Minnesota, United States. As of the 2020 census, Fairhaven had a population of 392.

The community is located near the junction of Stearns County Roads 7 and 44. Nearby places include Kimball, South Haven, Clearwater, and St. Augusta. Stearns County Road 45 is also in the immediate area.

Fairhaven contains one property listed on the National Register of Historic Places: the 1867 Fair Haven Flour Mill.

== Demographics ==
Historical population
Census	Pop.	Note	%±
2020	392		—
U.S. Decennial Census
