= Lawrence Brook Mill =

- Built: 1769 (earliest documentation)
- Location: Milltown, New Jersey
- Coordinates: 40°26′56″N 74°26′22″W
- Industry: Flour grinding, rubber manufacturing, textile manufacturing
- Products: Flour, rubber, textiles
- Defunct: around 1935

The Lawrence Brook Mill, formerly Bergen's Mill is a closed gristmill located in Milltown, New Jersey. It is made up of a fulling mill, a press house, a water tower, a chimney, and various worker dwellings.

== History ==
In 1769, Fulcard Van Nordstrand advertised the sale of the gristmill possibly after its completion. This is the oldest documentation of a mill in Milltown. The mill was sold eight years later by Ferdinand Schuurman. He died a year later and the mill was given to his wife, Eleanor Schuurman, and his son, Abraham Schuurman.

In 1789, Abraham sold the mill to Tunis Quick of Hunterdon County, which was then sold four years later to Nicholas Van Bundt, who built the fulling mill. Van Brundt sold the mill to John Bennett the following year, who sold it to Christian Van Nortwick a year later, who leased it to Timothy Enixon the following year.

The water tower and the towering smokestack of the mill.

The mill was then acquired by Jacob Bergen in 1811, who named it Bergen's Mill. In 1812, Bergen constructed a new fulling mill and a press house, which he advertised for his services. In his advertisement, he became the first to call the surrounding settlement "Milltown." He died 24 years later, after which his family oversaw the mill's production.

In 1843, a fire caused the mill to cease operation. It was subsequently acquired by Christopher Meyer who formed the Meyer Rubber Company and converted the mill into a factory. The structure received repairs, but another fire destroyed the factory and Meyer's home two years later. The factory then became financed by John R. Ford and was renamed Ford & Co. In 1851, another fire destroyed the factory. The factory was again rebuilt the following year and named the Ford Rubber Company after the issuance of stocks. Six years later, the factory was renamed the Meyer Rubber Company again, with Christopher Meyer as the president.

In 1896, the factory stopped production. The India Rubber Company operated the factory from 1897 to 1906; it was succeeded by the International Rubber Company. The factory was then taken over by Michelin Tire Company in 1907. Many of the buildings which are currently part of the mill were made during that year. In 1919, Michelin built 53 homes (which would soon expand to 200) in Milltown. During the company's peak year, Michelin would employ over 2000 workers. Michelin left in 1930 due to the Great Depression, and a few companies (Heidingsfield Printing Company, Algro Knitting Mills, and Alphaduct Wire) subsequently used the factory during this time. Shortly afterward, the factory permanently retired.
