= Marvin Booker =

American gridiron football player (born 1990)

No. 94, 56
- Position: Defensive end

Personal information
- Born: March 16, 1990 (age 36); Piscataway, New Jersey, U.S.
- Listed height: 6 ft 2 in (1.88 m)
- Listed weight: 244 lb (111 kg)

Career information
- High school: Piscataway (NJ)
- College: Rutgers
- NFL draft: 2013: undrafted

Career history
- Tampa Bay Buccaneers (2013); Winnipeg Blue Bombers (2014); Brooklyn Bolts (2015–2016); Bloomington Edge (2017–?)
- Stats at Pro Football Reference
- Stats at CFL.ca (archive)

Marvin Booker (born March 16, 1990) is an American former professional football defensive end. Booker played college football at Rutgers.

== Early life ==
Booker grew up in Piscataway, New Jersey and played under coach Dan Higgins Jr. at Piscataway Township High School, where he graduated in 2008 and would play alongside Dwayne Gratz, J.D. Griggs, Anthony Davis as well as many other future NFL talents. A three-year letter-man, Booker would go on to lead the Chiefs to an 11–1 record, ultimately losing in the North Jersey Section 2 Group IV Final against rival Hunterdon Central. Making the transition from DE to LB in his last year at Piscataway High School, Booker tallied 128 tackles, 20 tackles for loss and 6 sacks. During his senior season, Booker signed an LOI (Letter of Intent) to attend nearby Rutgers University to join former PHS teammate Anthony Davis under coach Greg Schiano.

== College career ==
Booker played college football at Rutgers. As a true freshman Booker contributed on special teams for 11 out of 13 games. Booker suffered multiple injuries in his college career but found ways to be a solid contributor throughout his college career. During Booker's pro day he weighed in at 6'2/244 and recorded a 4.69 40 yrd-dash, 10' 5" Broad Jump, 34" Vertical, 36 reps of 225lbs, and a 4.19 Short Shuttle.

== Professional career ==
=== Tampa Bay Buccaneers ===
On August 5, 2013, Booker was signed by the Tampa Bay Buccaneers. On August 8, 2013, Booker was waived/injured by the Buccaneers. On August 9, 2013, he cleared waivers and was placed on the Buccaneers' injured reserve list.

=== Winnipeg Blue Bombers ===
Booker signed with the Winnipeg Blue Bombers on September 4, 2014.

=== Bloomington Edge ===
On April 30, 2017, Booker signed with the Bloomington Edge of Champions Indoor Football.
