= Piscataway, New Jersey =

Township in New Jersey, US

- Township
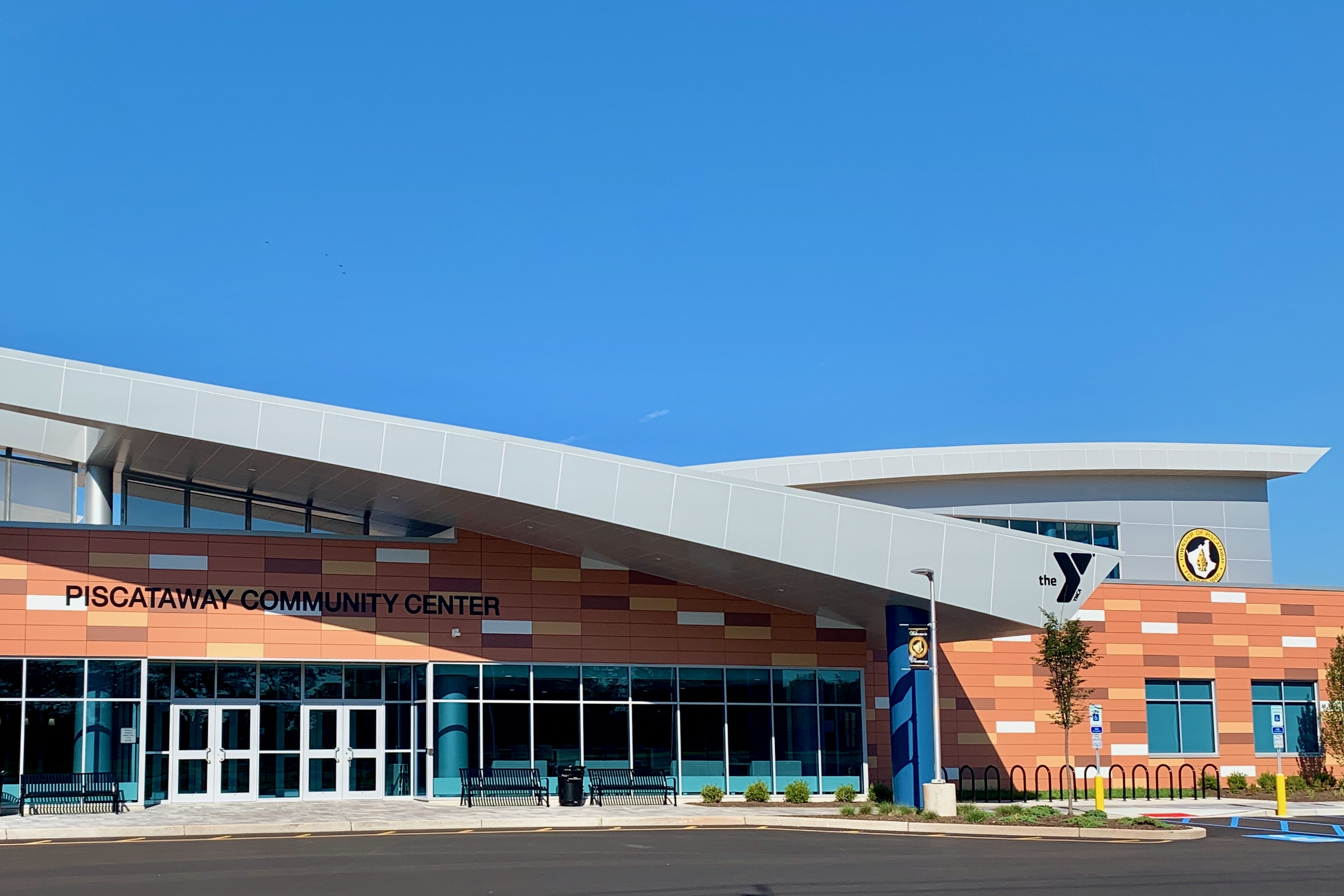
- The YMCA at the Community Center

- Seal
- Motto: A Proud Diversified Community
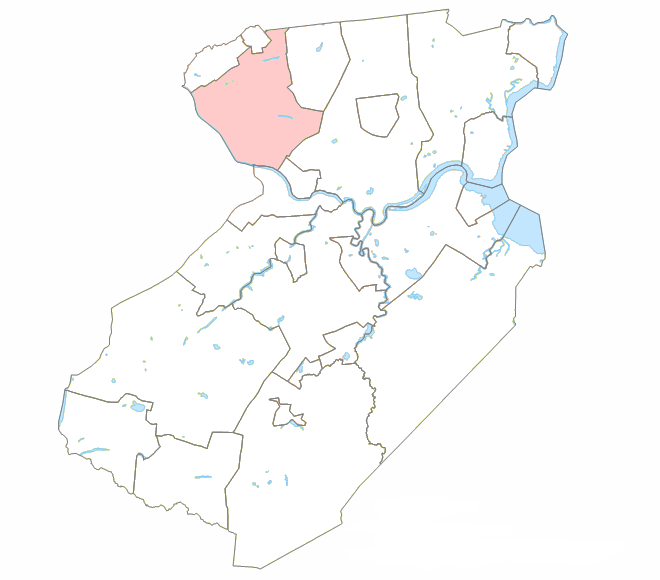
- Location of Piscataway Township in Middlesex County highlighted in pink

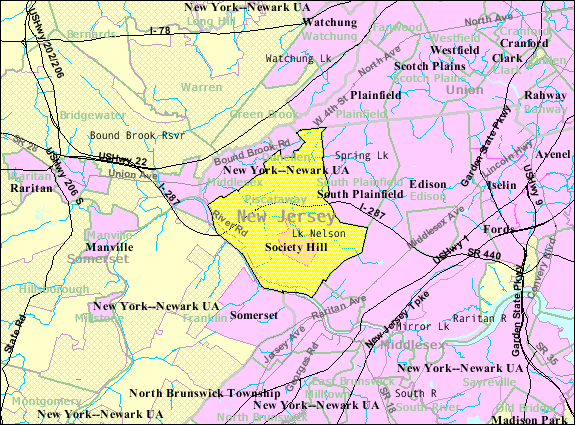
- Census Bureau map of Piscataway Township, New Jersey

- Location in Middlesex County Location in New Jersey Location in the United States
- Coordinates: 40.545539°N 74.46072°W
- Country: United States
- State: New Jersey
- County: Middlesex
- Formed: October 31, 1693
- Incorporated: February 21, 1798

Government
  - Type: Faulkner Act Mayor-Council
  - Body: Township Council
  - Mayor: Brian C. Wahler (D, term ends December 31, 2028)
  - Business administrator: Paula Cozzarelli
  - Municipal clerk: Melissa A. Seader

Area
  - Total: 18.96 sq mi (49.11 km^{2})
  - Land: 18.80 sq mi (48.68 km^{2})
  - Water: 0.17 sq mi (0.43 km^{2}) 0.88%
  - Rank: 149th of 565 in state 7th of 25 in county
- Elevation: 52 ft (16 m)

Population (2020)
  - Total: 60,804
  - Estimate (2023): 60,944
  - Rank: 25th of 565 in state 4th of 25 in county
  - Density: 3,235.3/sq mi (1,249.2/km^{2})
  - Rank: 206th of 565 in state 16th of 25 in county
- Time zone: UTC−05:00 (Eastern (EST))
  - Summer (DST): UTC−04:00 (Eastern (EDT))
- ZIP Codes: 08854, 08855
- Area codes: 732 and 908
- FIPS code: 3402359010
- GNIS feature ID: 0882167
- Website: piscatawaynj.org

Piscataway (English pronunciation: /pɪsˈkætəweɪ/) is a township in Middlesex County, in the U.S. state of New Jersey. It is a suburb of the New York metropolitan area, in the Raritan Valley. As of the 2020 United States census, the township's population was 60,804, an increase of 4,760 (+8.5%) from the 2010 census count of 56,044, which in turn reflected an increase of 5,562 (+11.0%) from 50,482 at the 2000 census.

The name may be derived from the area's earliest European settlers who came from near the Piscataqua River, a landmark defining the coastal border between New Hampshire and Maine, whose name derives from peske (branch) and tegwe (tidal river), or alternatively from pisgeu (meaning "dark night") and awa ("place of") or from a Lenape language word meaning "great deer". The area was appropriated in 1666 by Quakers and Baptists who had left the Puritan colony in New Hampshire.

Piscataway Township was formed on December 17, 1666, and officially incorporated by an act of the New Jersey Legislature on February 21, 1798, as part of the state's initial group of 104 townships. The community, the fifth-oldest municipality in New Jersey, has grown from Native American territory, through a colonial period and is one of the links in the earliest settlement of the Atlantic Ocean seacoast that ultimately led to the formation of the United States. Over the years, portions of Piscataway were taken to form Raritan Township (March 17, 1870, now Edison), Dunellen (October 28, 1887), Middlesex (April 9, 1913) and South Plainfield (March 10, 1926).

Rutgers University's main campus spills into the township. SHI Stadium, home field for the Rutgers Scarlet Knights football team, is in Piscataway as well as part of the Robert Wood Johnson Medical School.

== History ==
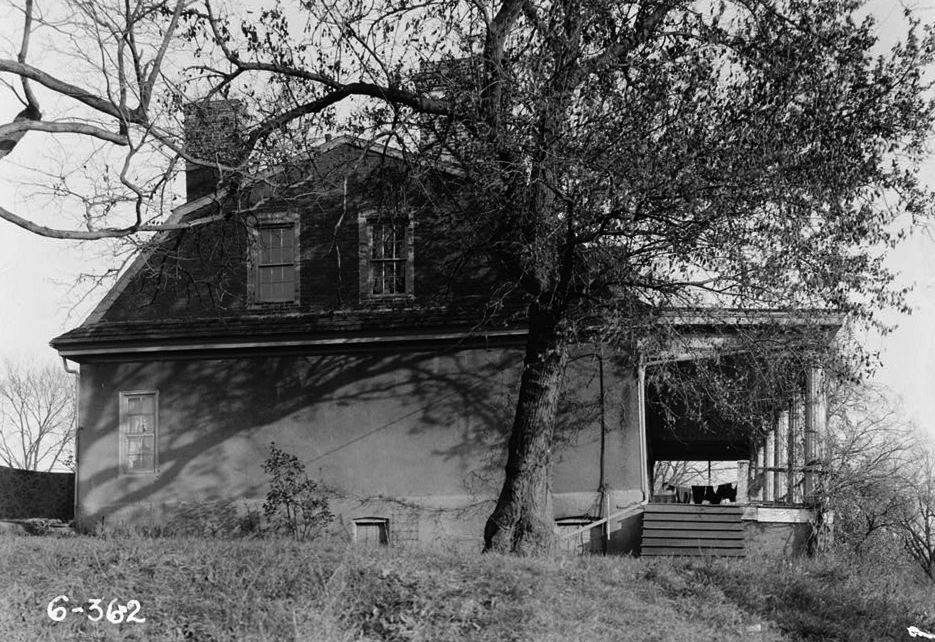
Ross Hall was the headquarters for General George Washington when he ordered a feu de joie for the second anniversary of the signing of the Declaration of Independence in July 1778.

The earliest recorded settlers of the area were the Lenape Native Americans; who lived for generations in what they called Lenapehoking, a region spanning present-day New Jersey, eastern Pennsylvania, Delaware, and parts of New York. In 1666, European settlers from New England obtained deeds for approximately 40,000 acres of land from Lenape leaders. These transactions were recorded by colonial authorities as land purchases under English law. However, historians note that Lenape concepts of land use emphasized communal stewardship rather than permanent private ownership, differing significantly from European legal traditions. As European settlement expanded, these differing interpretations and power imbalances contributed to the gradual dispossession and displacement of the Lenape from their ancestral lands.

In 1666, the first proprietary Governor of the Province of New Jersey, Philip Carteret, granted 12 new settlers from Massachusetts a 100 square mile allotment of land that was later founded as the townships of Piscataway and Woodbridge. Similar types of settlements established by religious dissenters fleeing Puritan colonies in New England were being formed in other parts of New Jersey, notably the Elizabethtown Tract in Northern New Jersey near the mouth of the Raritan River and extending upwards into modern day Essex County, and the Monmouth Tract in Central New Jersey near the Raritan Bay and extending southward along the Jersey Shore to the Barnegat Inlet.

Additional settlers from the Piscataqua River area of New Hampshire moved to Piscataway, bringing the name. Coming from a lumbering, shipbuilding and fishing background, these settlers, consisting of mostly Baptists and Quakers, were comfortable with their new surroundings, and looking forward to starting a new life away from political and religious persecution in the north. They were also enterprising and pioneering families who were already experienced in wilderness settlement. Before the original settlers, there were pioneer scouts who surveyed these new lands and waterways. The town name of Piscataway came from these early pioneers who originally came from the town of Piscataqua. During the original land purchase, the pioneers had signed 12 Articles of Agreement with Governor Carteret, which served as the legal basis for the government of Piscataway and Woodbridge and which shaped the democratic development of self-government. In short, these articles were mainly designed to provide liberty and land ownership for new families and to allow them to establish their own government representatives and religious freedoms.

After a few line and boundary changes, Piscataway and its outer plantations were reported to total 40,000 acres, with 66 square miles of land in 1685. The Lenape Native Americans occupied the entire Piscataway area, but were dispelled as the encroachment of European settlers increased. Across multiple generations, the Lenape established defined trails that European settlers appropriated in order to traverse through the wilderness area and partition new lands. Over time, many of these primitive trails became the main routes of travel between communities and became the basis of roads that still exist today. The trails along the Raritan River were named after a local population of Native Americans called the Raritangs. Piscataway Township is the fifth-oldest municipality in New Jersey and among the fifty oldest municipalities in the United States.

On February 8, 1777, the Battle of Quibbletown, a running battle took place between approximately 2,000 British and Hessian troops under the command of British General Charles Lord Cornwallis and the local patriot militia led by Colonel Charles Scott and a separate militia commanded by Brigadier General Nathaniel Warner.

== Geography ==
According to the United States Census Bureau, the township had a total area of 18.96 square miles (49.11 km^{2}), including 18.79 square miles (48.68 km^{2}) of land and 0.17 square miles (0.43 km^{2}) of water (0.88%).

The township lies on the south side of the Raritan Valley, a line of cities in Central Jersey, along with New Brunswick, Highland Park and South Plainfield. Piscataway is 45 minutes southwest of New York City and 53 minutes northeast of Philadelphia.

Piscataway is bordered by nine municipalities: Dunellen, Edison, Highland Park, Middlesex, New Brunswick and South Plainfield in Middlesex County; Franklin Township and South Bound Brook in Somerset County; and Plainfield in Union County.

Piscataway is often segmented by local residents into unincorporated communities, localities and place names which include Arbor, Bound Brook Heights ("the Heights"), Fellowship Farm, Fieldville, Johnson Park, Lake Nelson, New Brunswick Highlands, New Market (known as Quibbletown in the 18th Century), Newtown, North Stelton, Possumtown, Randolphville, Raritan Landing, Riverview Manor, Society Hill The original settlement of Piscatawaytown is located in present-day Edison.

Camp Kilmer, constructed starting in 1941 on 1,500 acres (610 ha) of Piscataway and Edison, was activated in June 1942 by the United States Army as a staging area and part of an installation of the New York Port of Embarkation. Troops were quartered at Camp Kilmer in preparation for transport to the European Theater of Operations in World War II, ultimately becoming the largest processing center for troops heading overseas and returning from World War II, processing over 2.5 million soldiers. Following the failed 1956 Hungarian Revolution, Camp Kilmer was reactivated and used to process 30,000 refugees who were resettled in the area and across the country. The camp was officially closed in 2009.

Significant portions of Piscataway make up the Livingston and Busch Campuses of Rutgers University.

The Arbor and New Brunswick Highland sections of Piscataway were African American neighborhoods in the past.

The New Market section historically comprised the Quaker village of Quibbletown. The early name of the village originated from the fact that settlers of different religious denominations quibbled about whether the Sabbath should be observed on Saturday or on Sunday in the village.

== Demographics ==
Historical population
Census	Pop.	Note	%±
1790	2,261		—
1810	2,475		—
1820	2,648		7.0%
1830	2,664		0.6%
1840	2,828		6.2%
1850	2,975		5.2%
1860	3,186		7.1%
1870	2,757	*	−13.5%
1880	2,425		−12.0%
1890	2,226	*	−8.2%
1900	2,628		18.1%
1910	3,523		34.1%
1920	5,385	*	52.9%
1930	5,865	*	8.9%
1940	7,243		23.5%
1950	10,180		40.5%
1960	19,890		95.4%
1970	36,418		83.1%
1980	42,223		15.9%
1990	47,089		11.5%
2000	50,482		7.2%
2010	56,044		11.0%
2020	60,804		8.5%
2024 (est.)	62,733		3.2%
Population sources: 1790–1920; 1840 1850–1870 1850; 1870 1880–1890; 1890–1910 1910–1930; 1940–2000 2000; 2010 2020 * = Lost territory in previous decade.

=== 2020 census ===
The 2020 United States Census, counted a population of 60,804, reflecting an increase from 56,044 in 2010.

=== 2010 census ===
The 2010 United States census counted 56,044 people, 17,050 households, and 12,958 families in the township. The population density was 2,975.5 per square mile (1,148.8/km^{2}). There were 17,777 housing units at an average density of 943.8 per square mile (364.4/km^{2}). The racial makeup was 38.46% (21,554) White, 20.69% (11,596) Black or African American, 0.31% (173) Native American, 33.45% (18,744) Asian, 0.02% (13) Pacific Islander, 3.59% (2,011) from other races, and 3.48% (1,953) from two or more races. Hispanic or Latino of any race were 11.22% (6,289) of the population.

Of the 17,050 households, 35.0% had children under the age of 18; 59.9% were married couples living together; 11.7% had a female householder with no husband present and 24.0% were non-families. Of all households, 18.6% were made up of individuals and 5.6% had someone living alone who was 65 years of age or older. The average household size was 2.91 and the average family size was 3.33.

20.1% of the population were under the age of 18, 17.8% from 18 to 24, 28.3% from 25 to 44, 24.1% from 45 to 64, and 9.7% who were 65 years of age or older. The median age was 33.0 years. For every 100 females, the population had 99.2 males. For every 100 females ages 18 and older there were 96.8 males.

The Census Bureau's 2006–2010 American Community Survey showed that (in 2010 inflation-adjusted dollars) median household income was $88,428 (with a margin of error of +/− $3,958) and the median family income was $95,483 (+/− $3,327). Males had a median income of $57,308 (+/− $4,335) versus $48,606 (+/− $1,863) for females. The per capita income for the borough was $31,254 (+/− $1,335). About 2.5% of families and 4.3% of the population were below the poverty line, including 3.9% of those under age 18 and 4.5% of those age 65 or over.

=== 2000 census ===
As of the 2000 United States census there were 50,482 people, 16,500 households, and 12,325 families residing in the township. The population density was 2,688.6 inhabitants per square mile (1,038.1/km^{2}). There were 16,946 housing units at an average density of 902.5 per square mile (348.5/km^{2}). The racial makeup of the township was 48.81% White, 20.31% African American, 0.21% Native American, 24.80% Asian, 0.03% Pacific Islander, 3.08% from other races, and 2.77% from two or more races. Hispanic or Latino of any race were 7.93% of the population.

As of the 2000 Census, 12.49% of Piscataway's residents identified themselves as being of Indian American ancestry, which was the fourth highest of any municipality in the United States and the third highest in New Jersey—behind Edison (17.75%) and Plainsboro Township (16.97%)—of all places with 1,000 or more residents identifying their ancestry.

There were 16,500 households, out of which 34.6% had children under the age of 18 living with them, 60.6% were married couples living together, 10.4% had a female householder with no husband present, and 25.3% were non-families. 19.5% of all households were made up of individuals, and 5.4% had someone living alone who was 65 years of age or older. The average household size was 2.84 and the average family size was 3.29.

In the township, the population was spread out, with 21.9% under the age of 18, 14.1% from 18 to 24, 33.3% from 25 to 44, 22.1% from 45 to 64, and 8.7% who were 65 years of age or older. The median age was 33 years. For every 100 females, there were 97.9 males. For every 100 females age 18 and over, there were 95.2 males.

The median income for a household in the township was $68,721, and the median income for a family was $75,218. Males had a median income of $47,188 versus $36,271 for females. The per capita income for the township was $26,321. About 2.7% of families and 3.8% of the population were below the poverty line, including 3.3% of those under age 18 and 4.3% of those age 65 or over.

== Economy ==
Corporate residents of Piscataway include:

- American Standard Brands
- Cintas Corporation
- Colgate-Palmolive, Research and Development
- GenScript Biotech
- Gorgias Press, an academic publisher that specializes in Eastern Christianity.
- Hapag-Lloyd America, an international shipping company.
- IEEE
- Ingersoll Rand and its wholly owned subsidiary Trane
- Johnson & Johnson Health Care Systems Inc.
- Pepsi Cola Bottling Group – bottling plant.
- Siemens Hearing Instruments, the world's largest manufacturer of hearing aids.

The world headquarters of Telcordia Technologies had been located in Piscataway, until a June 2011 deal in which Ericsson acquired the company in a deal valued at $1.15 billion.

== Sports ==
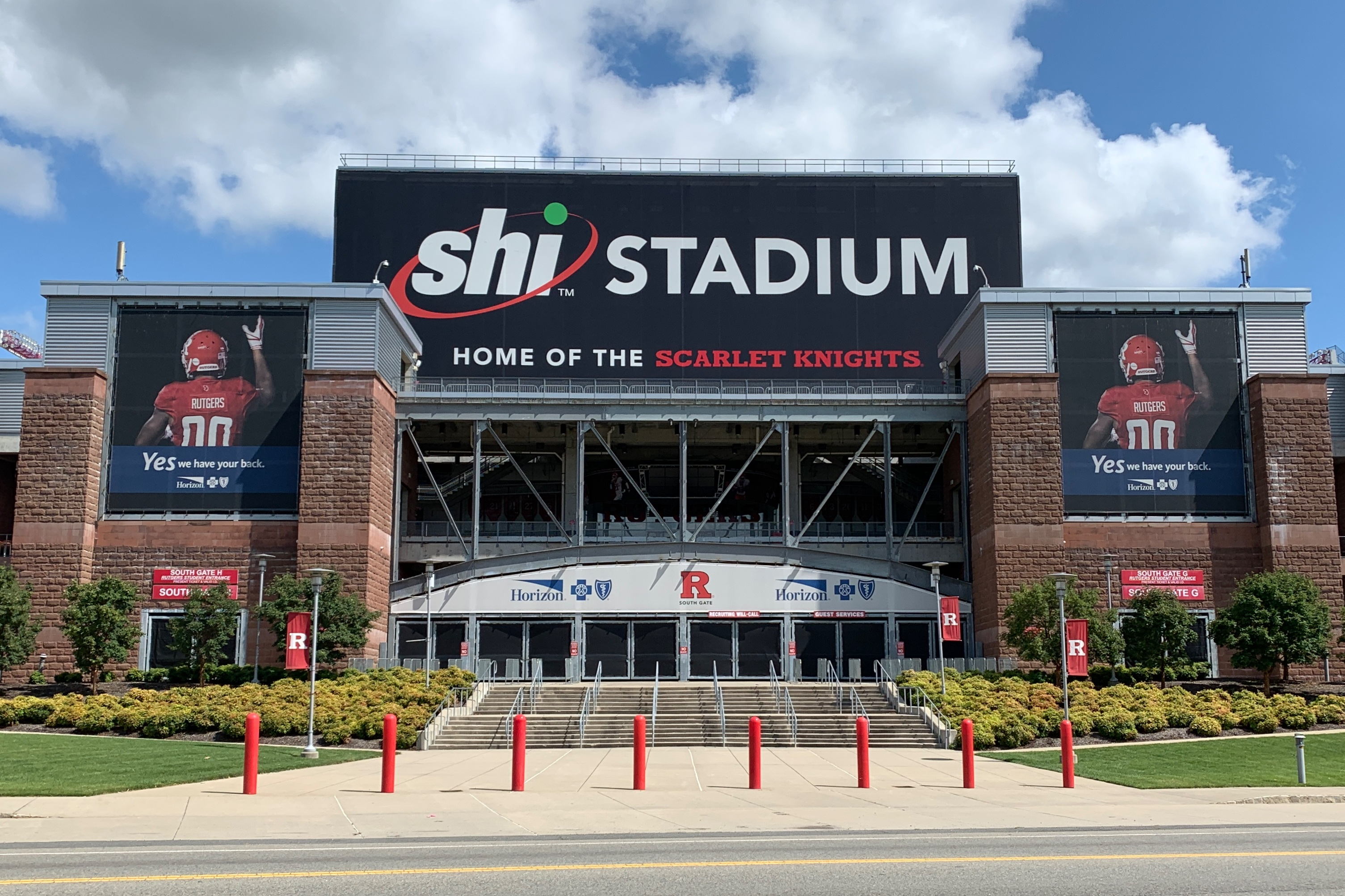
SHI Stadium at Rutgers University's Busch Campus in Piscataway

SHI Stadium was originally constructed in 1994 with 41,500 seats as the home of the Rutgers Scarlet Knights football team and was expanded to a capacity of 52,454 in 2009 after a $100 million expansion.

Jersey Mike's Arena is the home of the Rutgers University men's and women's basketball teams. The venue was originally named the Rutgers Athletic Center, still called the RAC by many, and can accommodate 9,000 attendees. The athletic center was the home of the professional New Jersey Nets for the four seasons from 1977–1981 after moving from New York and before the Meadowlands Arena was completed.

Yurcak Field is a multi-purpose soccer and lacrosse stadium, built in 1994, and holds 5,000 people. The stadium is officially named "The Soccer/Lacrosse Stadium at Yurcak Field" in honor of Ronald N. Yurcak, a 1965 All-American Rutgers lacrosse player. Rutgers University host their home games at this stadium.

== Government ==
=== Local government ===
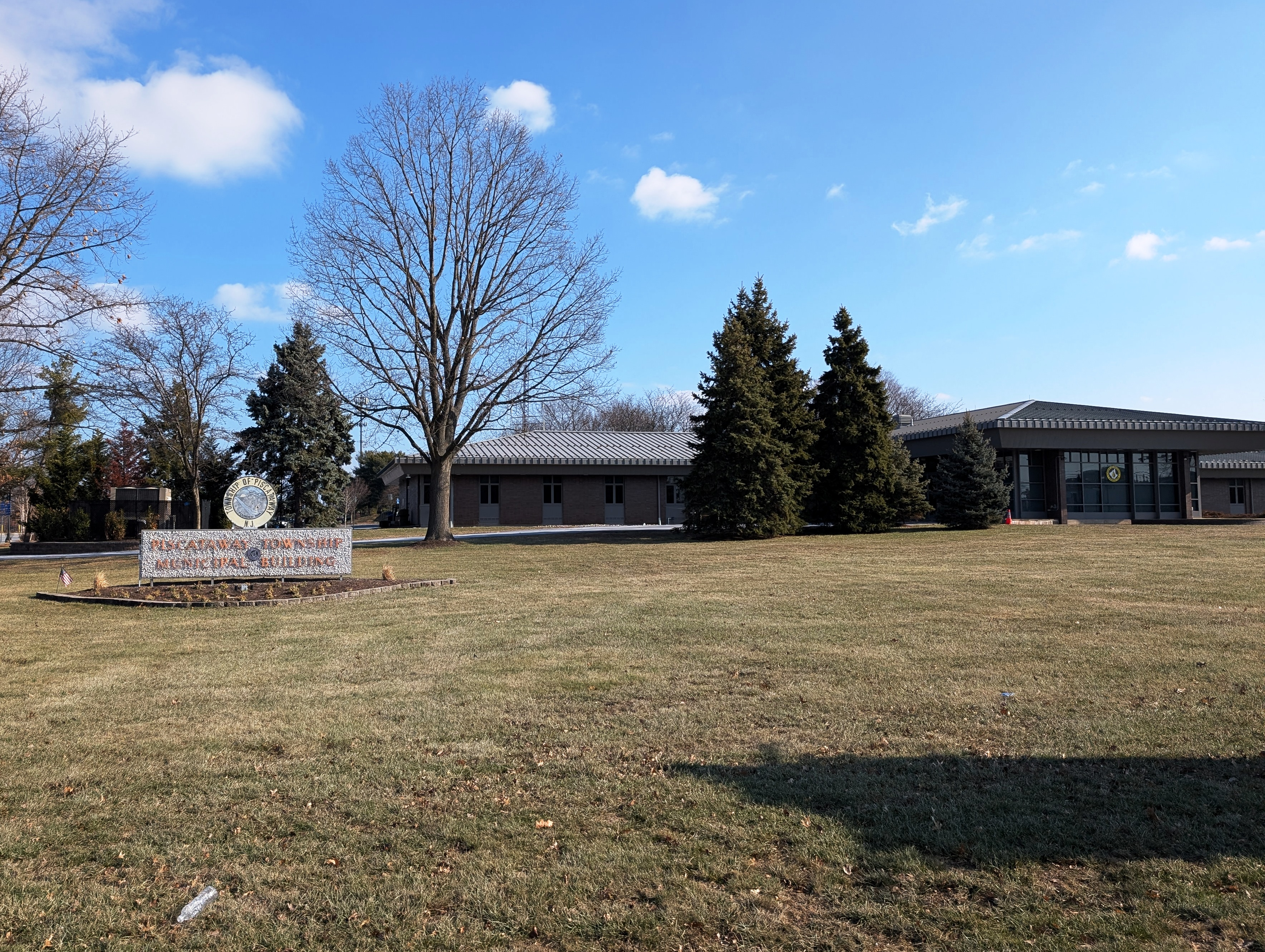
Piscataway Township Municipal Building

In November 1966, Piscataway voters, under the Faulkner Act, approved a Charter Study and elected a Charter Study Commission to recommend the form of government best suited to the township's needs. The Commission recommended Mayor-Council Plan F. Voters approved the plan in a referendum in November 1967 and the new form of government was inaugurated on January 1, 1969. The township is one of 71 municipalities (of the 564) statewide governed under this form. Under Plan F the Mayor is the administrator and the Council is the legislative body. A full-time business administrator, appointed by the Mayor with the advice and consent of the Council, and responsible to the Mayor, supervises the day-by-day operation of municipal government. The Township Council has seven members, one representing each of four wards, and three at-large members. The Mayor and Council members serve four-year terms on a staggered basis, with either the three at-large seats (and the mayoral seat) or the four ward seats up for vote in even years as part of the November general election.

As of 2024, the mayor of Piscataway is Democrat Brian C. Wahler, whose term of office ends December 31, 2024. Members of the Township Council are Council President Gabrielle Cahill (D, 2024; At Large), Council Vice President Dennis Espinosa (D, 2026; Ward 2), Sharon Carmichael (D, 2026; Ward 3), Michele Lombardi (D, 2026; Ward 4), Laura Leibowitz (D, 2025; At Large), Sarah Rashid (D, 2025; At Large) and Frank Uhrin (D, 2026; Ward 1).

In May 2021, the Township Council appointed Linwood D. Rouse to fill the at-large seat expiring in December 2024 that had been held by Chanelle Scott McCullum until she stepped down to take a seat on the Middlesex County Board of County Commissioners following the death of Commissioner Kenneth Armwood. Rouse served on an interim basis until the November 2021 election, when he was elected to serve the balance of the term of office.

Camille Fernicola was appointed to fill the at-large seat expiring in December 2016 that had been held by Michael Griffith until his death in November 2014. In the November 2015 general election, Fernicola was elected to serve the balance of the term of office.

Chanelle McCullum was appointed in April 2013 to fill the vacant at-large seat of Kenneth Armwood, who had been the township council president until he was appointed to fill a vacant seat on the Middlesex County Board of Chosen Freeholders. McCullum was elected in November 2013 to serve the balance of the unexpired term through its expiration in December 2016.

=== Federal, state and county representation ===
Piscataway is located in the 6th Congressional District and is part of New Jersey's 17th state legislative district.

For the 119th United States Congress, New Jersey's 6th congressional district is represented by Frank Pallone (D, Long Branch). New Jersey is represented in the United States Senate by Democrats Cory Booker (Newark, term ends 2027) and Andy Kim (Moorestown, term ends 2031).

For the 2026–2027 session, the 17th legislative district of the New Jersey Legislature is represented in the State Senate by Bob Smith (D, Piscataway) and in the General Assembly by Joseph Danielsen (D, Franklin Township) and Kevin Egan (D, New Brunswick).

Middlesex County is governed by a Board of County Commissioners, whose seven members are elected at-large on a partisan basis to serve three-year terms of office on a staggered basis, with either two or three seats coming up for election each year as part of the November general election. At an annual reorganization meeting held in January, the board selects from among its members a commissioner director and deputy director. As of 2025, Middlesex County's Commissioners (with party affiliation, term-end year, and residence listed in parentheses) are:

Director Ronald G. Rios (D, Carteret, 2027), Deputy Director Shanti Narra (D, North Brunswick, 2027), Claribel A. "Clary" Azcona-Barber (D, New Brunswick, 2025), Charles Kenny (D, Woodbridge Township, 2025), Leslie Koppel (D, Monroe Township, 2026), Chanelle Scott McCullum (D, Piscataway, 2025) and Charles E. Tomaro (D, Edison, 2026).

Constitutional officers are: Clerk Nancy Pinkin (D, 2025, East Brunswick), Sheriff Mildred S. Scott (D, 2025, Piscataway) and Surrogate Claribel Cortes (D, 2026; North Brunswick).

=== Politics ===
As of March 2011, there were a total of 31,266 registered voters in Piscataway Township, of which 11,355 (36.3%) were registered as Democrats, 3,034 (9.7%) were registered as Republicans and 16,859 (53.9%) were registered as Unaffiliated. There were 18 voters registered to other parties.

United States presidential election results for Piscataway
Year	Republican		Democratic		Third party(ies)	
Year	No.	%	No.	%	No.	%
2024	8,002	33.76%	14,599	61.60%	1,100	4.64%
2020	6,690	27.42%	17,390	71.29%	315	1.29%
2016	5,389	24.94%	15,505	71.76%	714	3.30%
2012	5,125	24.35%	15,659	74.40%	262	1.24%
2008	6,111	27.40%	15,978	71.64%	215	0.96%
2004	6,749	34.44%	12,627	64.44%	218	1.11%
2000	5,327	31.55%	10,808	64.02%	748	4.43%

In the 2012 presidential election, Democrat Barack Obama received 74.4% of the vote (15,659 cast), ahead of Republican Mitt Romney with 24.4% (5,125 votes), and other candidates with 1.2% (262 votes), among the 21,227 ballots cast by the township's 33,597 registered voters (181 ballots were spoiled), for a turnout of 63.2%. In the 2008 presidential election, Democrat Barack Obama received 71.0% of the vote (15,978 cast), ahead of Republican John McCain with 27.2% (6,111 votes) and other candidates with 1.0% (215 votes), among the 22,491 ballots cast by the township's 32,398 registered voters, for a turnout of 69.4%. In the 2004 presidential election, Democrat John Kerry received 64.2% of the vote (12,627 ballots cast), outpolling Republican George W. Bush with 34.3% (6,749 votes) and other candidates with 0.8% (218 votes), among the 19,670 ballots cast by the township's 27,842 registered voters, for a turnout percentage of 70.6.

Gubernatorial election results for Piscataway
Year	Republican		Democratic		Third party(ies)	
Year	No.	%	No.	%	No.	%
2025	4,363	24.55%	13,254	74.57%	158	0.89%
2021	3,817	29.12%	9,140	69.72%	152	1.16%
2017	3,376	29.13%	7,963	68.71%	250	2.16%
2013	5,129	48.21%	5,388	50.64%	122	1.15%
2009	4,637	37.83%	6,773	55.25%	849	6.93%
2005	3,917	32.55%	7,556	62.78%	562	4.67%

In the 2013 gubernatorial election, Democrat Barbara Buono received 50.6% of the vote (5,388 cast), ahead of Republican Chris Christie with 48.2% (5,129 votes), and other candidates with 1.1% (122 votes), among the 10,823 ballots cast by the township's 34,170 registered voters (184 ballots were spoiled), for a turnout of 31.7%. In the 2009 gubernatorial election, Democrat Jon Corzine received 54.9% of the vote (6,773 ballots cast), ahead of Republican Chris Christie with 37.6% (4,637 votes), Independent Chris Daggett with 6.0% (738 votes) and other candidates with 0.9% (111 votes), among the 12,334 ballots cast by the township's 31,079 registered voters, yielding a 39.7% turnout.

United States Senate election results for Piscataway1
Year	Republican		Democratic		Third party(ies)	
Year	No.	%	No.	%	No.	%
2024	6,706	30.14%	14,351	64.50%	1,191	5.35%
2018	4,541	25.97%	12,406	70.96%	537	3.07%
2012	4,766	24.24%	14,508	73.78%	389	1.98%
2006	3,706	32.37%	7,402	64.66%	340	2.97%

United States Senate election results for Piscataway2
Year	Republican		Democratic		Third party(ies)	
Year	No.	%	No.	%	No.	%
2020	6,413	26.69%	17,110	71.21%	503	2.09%
2014	2,509	27.34%	6,541	71.27%	128	1.39%
2013	2,104	28.10%	5,300	70.79%	83	1.11%
2008	6,081	29.63%	14,016	68.29%	427	2.08%

== Emergency services ==
=== Fire and EMS ===
Piscataway is divided into four fire districts which are served by a total of two volunteer rescue squads and six volunteer fire companies, one of which combines both fire and EMS services. The fire districts are the zones in which fire departments operate, and although the volunteer EMS squads follow the basic regions of the districts, only North Stelton Fire Rescue EMS is a part of a fire district. In 2021, the township council voted to privatize EMS services, with Hackensack Meridian Health providing EMS, to replace the volunteer rescue squads.

District 1

- Arbor Rescue Squad (EMS), 1790 W. 7th Street (partial coverage)
- River Road Rescue Squad (EMS), 101 Shirley Parkway (partial coverage)
- New Market Fire Company, 801 South Washington Avenue
- North Stelton Fire Rescue (EMS), 70 Haines Avenue (partial coverage)

District 2

- River Road Rescue Squad (EMS), 101 Shirley Parkway
- River Road Fire Company, 102 Netherwood Avenue
- Holmes Marshall Fire Company, 5300 Deborah Drive
- Possumtown Fire Company, 85 Stratton Street South

District 3

- Arbor Rescue Squad (EMS), 1790 W. 7th Street
- Arbor Hose Company, 1780 West Seventh Street

District 4

- North Stelton Volunteer Fire Company, 70 Haines Avenue

Fire Prevention

- Fire Marshall's Office, 555 Sidney Road

=== Police ===
The primary law enforcement agency in the township is the Piscataway Police Department. Rutgers University Police Department operates on its campuses within Piscataway. The New Jersey State Police patrols the section of Interstate 287 that bisects the township.

== Education ==
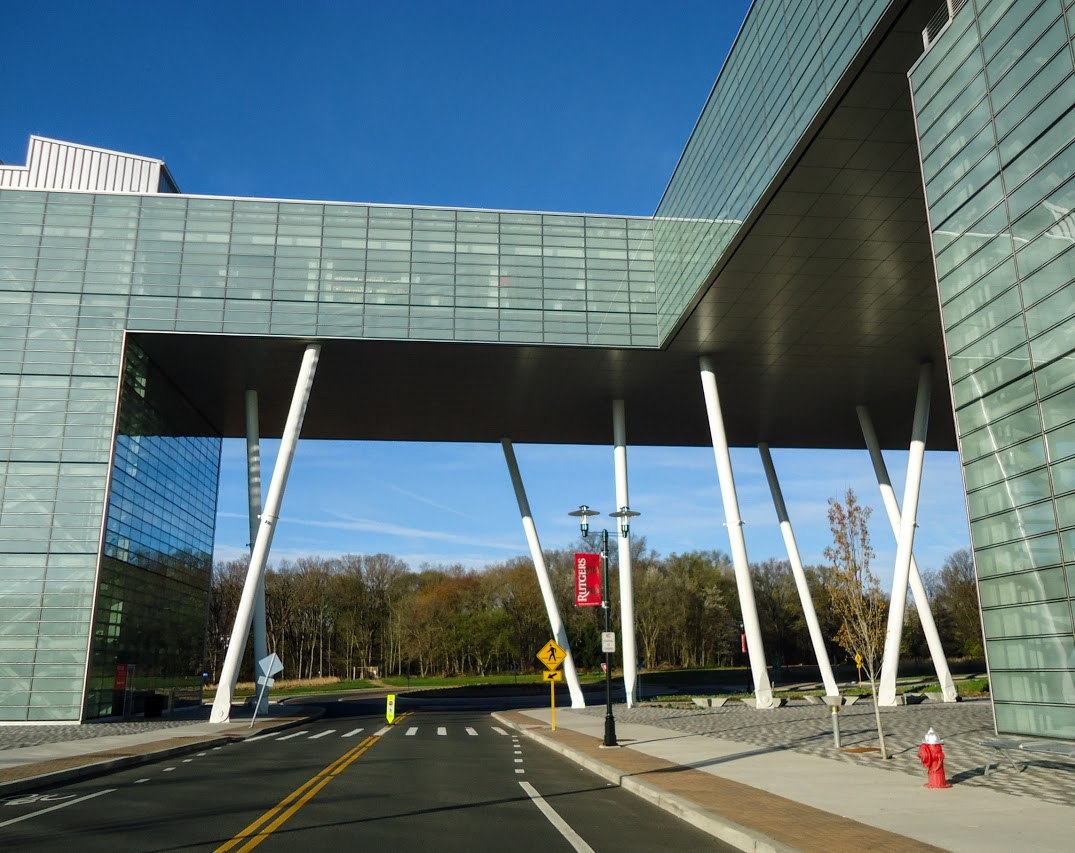
Rutgers Business School at the Livingston Campus in Piscataway

The Piscataway Township Schools serves students in pre-kindergarten through twelfth grades. In addition to its high school, there are four schools for K-3, two intermediate schools serving grades 4–5 and three middle schools for students in grades 6–8. As of the 2024–25 school year, the district, comprised of 11 schools, had an enrollment of 7,331 students and 552.0 classroom teachers (on an FTE basis), for a student–teacher ratio of 13.3:1. Schools in the district (with 2024–24 enrollment data from the National Center for Education Statistics) are Children's Corner Preschool (with 616 students in PreK), Eisenhower Elementary School (513 students; in grades K–3), Grandview Elementary School (579; K–3), Knollwood Elementary School (646; K–3), Randolphville Elementary School (465; K–3), Arbor Intermediate School (528; 4–5), Martin Luther King Intermediate School (488; 4–5), Conackamack Middle School (466; 6-8), Quibbletown Middle School (467; 6-8), Theodore Schor Middle School (563; 6-8) and Piscataway High School (2,144; 9-12).

Middlesex County schools

Eighth grade students from all of Middlesex County are eligible to apply to attend the high school programs offered by the Middlesex County Magnet Schools, a county-wide vocational school district that offers full-time career and technical education at its schools in East Brunswick, Edison, Perth Amboy, Piscataway and Woodbridge Township, with no tuition charged to students for attendance.

Other Middlesex County schools in Piscataway include:

- Nuview Academy Piscataway Campus, 1 Park Avenue – Programs for students with symptoms of; Depression, ADHD, Conduct Disorder, Thought Disorder, or Anxiety Disorder.
- Bright Beginnings Learning Center, 1660 Stelton Road – Programs for students with Autism.
- Piscataway Regional Day School, 1670 Stelton Road – Programs for students with Autism.
- Future Foundations Academy, 1690 Stelton Road – Programs for students with Autism.
- Raritan Valley Academy, 1690 Stelton Road – Programs for students with behavioral disabilities, learning and/or language disabilities.

Private schools

- Lake Nelson Seventh-day Adventist Academy, opened in February 1959, serves students in Pre-K to tenth grade.
- Timothy Christian School is a K–12 that was founded in 1949.
- An-Noor Academy, a Pre-K–12 school that has served the area's Muslim community since 2000.

Colleges and continuing education

- Rutgers University Busch and Livingston Campuses
- Rutgers Health Center for Advanced Biotechnology and Medicine and University Behavioral HealthCare (which overlaps with Rutgers Busch Campus)
- StenoTech Career Institute is a technical school that offers court reporting and medical transcription training.

== Transportation ==
=== Roads and highways ===
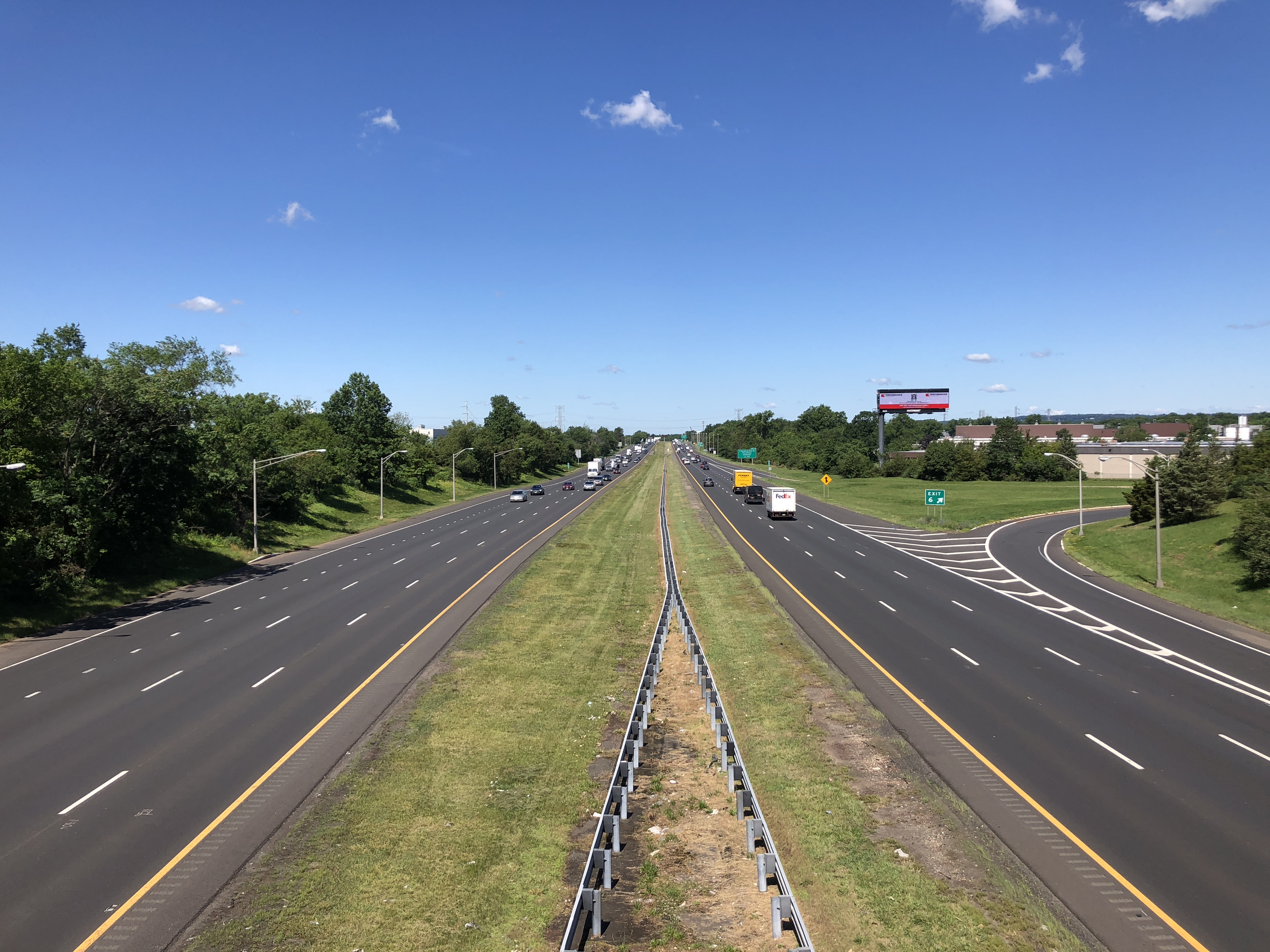
Interstate 287 northbound in Piscataway

As of May 2010, the township had a total of 206.70 miles (332.65 km) of roadways, of which 181.68 miles (292.39 km) were maintained by the municipality, 18.94 miles (30.48 km) by Middlesex County and 6.08 miles (9.78 km) by the New Jersey Department of Transportation.

Piscataway is served by a number of roads and highways. Interstate 287 traverses the township and includes exits 6, 7, 8 and 9. Reconstruction of the River Road (CR 622) Bridge at exit 9 was completed in 2024. County roads include CR 501 (along the border with South Plainfield) and CR 529. Route 18 runs along Hoes Lane to Interstate 287, which passes through the center of the township for about 4 miles (6.4 km).

Other limited access roads that are accessible include the New Jersey Turnpike (Interstate 95) in East Brunswick (Exit 9) and neighboring Edison (Exit 10).

=== Public transportation ===
NJ Transit provides bus service to and from the Port Authority Bus Terminal in Midtown Manhattan on the 114 route, to Newark on the 65 and 66 routes and local service on the 819 route. Train service is not available in Piscataway, but service is available on the Raritan Valley Line at the Dunellen station and on the Northeast Corridor at the Edison station.

Taiwanese airline EVA Air provides a private bus service to and from John F. Kennedy International Airport in New York City for customers based in New Jersey. This service stops in Piscataway.

== Points of interest ==
- WVPH is the community radio station of Piscataway High School and Rutgers University.
- Ferrer Colony and Modern School and Fellowship Farm Cooperative Association are the remnants of the 1910s Utopian societies.
- Road Up Raritan Historic District includes nine historic homes along River Road and was listed on the National Register of Historic Places in 1999.
- Metlar-Bodine House is a museum dedicated to the history of Piscataway "from Indian trails to Interstate" and was established in 1979 in a house whose earliest portions date to 1728.
- Cornelius Low House, constructed in 1741 and listed on the National Register of Historic Places, is operated as a Middlesex County Museum.
- East Jersey Old Town Village, located in Johnson Park, includes 16 homes characteristic of the farm houses that populated the area, that have been relocated and reconstructed on the site.

== Notable people ==
People who were born in, residents of, or otherwise closely associated with Piscataway include:

- Mike Alexander (born 1965), former NFL wide receiver
- Edward Antill (1701–1770), colonial plantation owner, attorney, and early politician in New Jersey colony
- Edward Antill (1742–1789), soldier who fought at the Battle of Quebec and was the son of the politician with the same name
- Margueritte Aozasa (born 1990), college soccer coach who is head coach of the UCLA Bruins women's soccer team
- Melissa Bacelar (born 1979), horror film actress
- Justin Bailey (born 1977), basketball player for University of Hartford and then foreign professional teams for 13 years
- Samuel E. Blum (1920–2013), chemist and physicist who developed the ultraviolet excimer laser
- Marvin Booker (born 1990), linebacker who has played in the NFL for the Tampa Bay Buccaneers
- Ralph Bowen (born 1961), Canadian-born jazz saxophonist
- Anthony Branker (born 1958), jazz musician and educator
- John Celestand (born 1977), 30th pick of 1999 NBA draft by the Los Angeles Lakers
- Mark Ciardi (born 1961), film producer and former Major League Baseball pitcher
- Anthony Davis (born 1989), offensive tackle for the San Francisco 49ers
- Dwayne Gratz (born 1990), cornerback who has played in the NFL for the Jacksonville Jaguars
- J. D. Griggs (born 1990), defensive end who has played in the Canadian Football League for the Winnipeg Blue Bombers
- Rachael Hip-Flores, actress who has appeared in Good People in Love and the web series Anyone But Me
- Malcolm Jenkins (born 1987), safety for the New Orleans Saints. Played college football for the Ohio State Buckeyes
- Asjha Jones (born 1980), WNBA basketball player for the Connecticut Sun
- Joe Lizura (born 1961), television meteorologist, who has also been an actor, spokesperson, author and television show developer, writer and producer
- Isaac Low (1735–1791), member of the First Continental Congress in 1774 who opposed armed conflict with the British and left the American side after the Declaration of Independence
- Nicholas Low (1739–1826), merchant, developer, and younger brother of Isaac
- Lisa Marie (born 1968), actress who has appeared in Planet of the Apes and Sleepy Hollow
- Luther Martin (1748–1826), Founding Father who refused to sign the United States Constitution as it violated states' rights in his view
- Richard Levis McCormick (born 1947), 19th President of Rutgers University
- Richard P. McCormick (1916–2006), historian and professor emeritus at Rutgers University, who served as president of the New Jersey Historical Society
- Steven Miller (born 1991), former professional football running back who played for the Saskatchewan Roughriders of the Canadian Football League
- Matt Nagy (born 1978), head coach of the Chicago Bears who played in the Arena Football League
- Ellis R. Ott (1905/06-1981), statistician, consultant and educator
- Derrick Palmer (born 1988/89), labor activist and whistleblower who is Vice President of Organizing of the Amazon Labor Union
- Joseph Fitz Randolph (1803–1873), member of the United States House of Representatives from New Jersey from 1837 to 1843
- Larry Ray (born 1959), criminal convicted of sex trafficking, extortion, forced labor, and other offenses, sentenced to 60 years in prison
- Brandon Renkart (born 1984), practice squad player for the Arizona Cardinals
- Paul Rudnick (born 1957), playwright, novelist, screenwriter and essayist
- Gail Shollar (1957–1992), early victim of carjacking, whose death led to stricter state penalties for the crime
- Bob Smith (born 1947), member of the New Jersey Senate since 2002 who spent five years as mayor of Piscataway
- Karl-Anthony Towns (born 1995), NBA basketball player for the New York Knicks
- Kyle Wilson (born 1987), cornerback for the New York Jets
- Eric Young Jr. (born 1985), second baseman and outfielder who has played for the New York Mets
