= Piscataway High School =

High school in Middlesex County, New Jersey, US

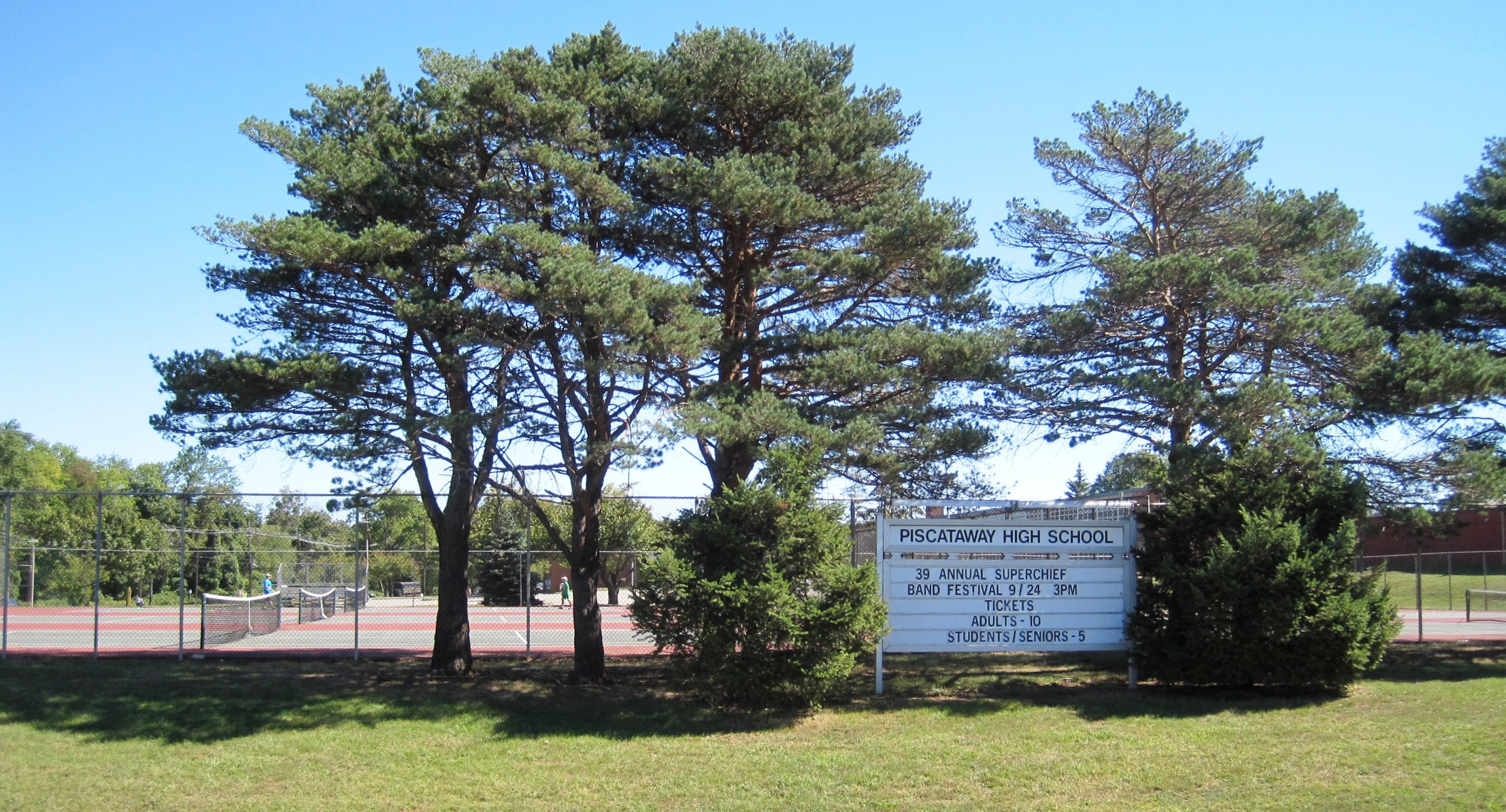
- School as seen from Hoes Lane Route 18

Location
- 100 Behmer Road; Piscataway, Middlesex County, New Jersey 08854; United States; 40.54831°N 74.474628°W

Information
- Type: Public high school
- Established: 1957
- School district: Piscataway Township Schools
- NCES School ID: 341305003554
- Principal: Christopher Baldassano
- Faculty: 151.3 FTEs
- Grades: 9–12
- Enrollment: 2,127 (as of 2023–24)
- Student to teacher ratio: 14.1:1
- Colors: Black and Gold
- Athletics conference: Greater Middlesex Conference (general); Big Central Football Conference (football)
- Team name: Chiefs
- Accreditation: Middle States Association of Colleges and Schools
- Website: phs.piscatawayschools.org

Piscataway High School is a four-year comprehensive community public high school serving students in ninth through twelfth grades from Piscataway in Middlesex County, in the U.S. state of New Jersey, operating as the lone secondary school of the Piscataway Township Schools. The school is comprised of two main buildings named after Susan B. Anthony and George S. Patton. The school is accredited by the New Jersey Department of Education and has been accredited by the Middle States Association of Colleges and Schools Commission on Elementary and Secondary Schools since 1963. Piscataway Township High School is known for its football program; three former players were drafted in the first round of the National Football League draft in two years, the first time in history that such an event has occurred.

As of the 2023–24 school year, the school had an enrollment of 2,127 students and 151.3 classroom teachers (on an FTE basis), for a student–teacher ratio of 14.1:1. There were 532 students (25.0% of enrollment) eligible for free lunch and 254 (11.9% of students) eligible for reduced-cost lunch.

== Awards, recognition and honors ==
The school has received the following notable awards and recognitions.

- Governor's School of Excellence, November 21, 2003
- Best Practice Award, 2002-03 for Comfort Zone
- Best Practice Award, 2004-05 for Life Skills and Beyond
- Golden Achievement Award, 2004
- Best Practice Award, 2005-06 for Senior Citizens Outreach Program & Exchange (SCOPE)
- Coalition of Essential Schools, 2005. First school in the state to be granted full membership.
- National AVID School Certified School, 2006
- Amistad Fellow, 2006

Piscataway High School received an "A" and was ranked "above average to excellent" in a recent issue of Inside Jersey Magazine, a publication of The Star-Ledger. The article, entitled "New Jersey's Top Performing Public High Schools," rated schools throughout the state based on academic achievement and test score growth over a four-year period. Piscataway High School was one of only nine schools out of 27 in Middlesex County to be given an "A" rating. The school was the 144th-ranked public high school in New Jersey out of 339 schools statewide in New Jersey Monthly magazine's September 2014 cover story on the state's "Top Public High Schools", using a new ranking methodology. The school had been ranked 217th in the state of 328 schools in 2012, after being ranked 140th in 2010 out of 322 schools listed. The magazine ranked the school 146th in 2008 out of 316 schools. The school was ranked 177th in the magazine's September 2006 issue, which surveyed 316 schools across the state. Schooldigger.com ranked the school tied for 151st out of 381 public high schools statewide in its 2011 rankings (a decrease of 15 positions from the 2010 ranking) which were based on the combined percentage of students classified as proficient or above proficient on the mathematics (84.0%) and language arts literacy (93.0%) components of the High School Proficiency Assessment (HSPA).

== Curriculum ==
Advanced Placement (AP) courses are offered in AP English Language and Composition, AP English Literature and Composition, AP French Language, AP Statistics, AP Spanish Language, AP Calculus, AP Computer Science, AP Biology, AP Chemistry, AP Physics, AP United States Government and Politics, AP United States History, AP World History, AP Environmental Science, AP Psychology, AP Macroeconomics, AP Music Theory, and AP Studio Art.

Its radio station is WVPH, also known as 90.3, "The Pulse of Piscataway", with students broadcasting for an hour in the morning and three hours in the afternoon, while students from Rutgers University broadcast on the station during the other hours.

== Notable legal cases ==
Two notable legal cases have originated at Piscataway High School.

=== New Jersey v. T. L. O. ===
An incident which occurred at the school in 1980 became a case that made it to the Supreme Court of the United States (in 1985).

On March 7, 1980, a 14-year-old freshman, identified in court documents only by the initials T. L. O., was caught by a teacher smoking in a bathroom with another girl at the high school. The teacher took both students to the Principal's Office where they met with Assistant Vice Principal Theodore Choplick. In a search of T. L. O.'s purse, Choplick observed a pack of cigarettes, and while removing the cigarettes he noticed a package of rolling papers, often closely tied to the use of marijuana. Choplick then began a more thorough search for the evidence of drugs, which revealed a small amount of marijuana, a pipe, empty plastic bags, a large quantity of money in $1 bills, an index card that appeared to list students who owed T. L. O. money, and two letters that implicated T. L. O. in being a drug dealer.

Choplick then notified T. L. O.'s mother and the police, to whom he turned over the evidence of drug dealing. The police requested the mother to take her daughter to police headquarters, where T. L. O. confessed to selling marijuana at the high school. Using the confession and the evidence obtained by Choplick's search, the State brought delinquency charges against T. L. O. in the Juvenile and Domestic Relations Court of Middlesex County.

T. L. O. claimed the assistant principal's search violated the Fourth Amendment. She moved to suppress the evidence found in her purse as well as her confession, arguing, the evidence was "fruit of the poisonous tree." The Juvenile Court denied the motion to suppress. Although the court concluded that the Fourth Amendment did apply to searches carried out by school officials, it held:

"a school official may properly conduct a search of a student's person if the official has a reasonable suspicion that a crime has been or is in the process of being committed, or reasonable cause to believe that the search is necessary to maintain school discipline or enforce school policies." Id., at 341, 428 A. 2d, at 1333 (emphasis in original).

The Supreme Court of the United States ruled that the search and seizure by school officials without a warrant was constitutional, as long as the search is deemed reasonable. This overturned the New Jersey Supreme Court ruling.

=== Piscataway Board of Education v. Sharon Taxman ===
Piscataway Board of Education v. Taxman, 91 F.3d 1547 (3d Cir. 1996) was a racial discrimination case begun in 1989. The school board of Piscataway, New Jersey needed to eliminate a teaching position from the high school Business Education department. Under New Jersey state law, tenured teachers have to be laid off in reverse order of seniority. The newest tenured teachers, Sharon Taxman and Debra Williams, white and African-American respectively, had started working at the school on the same day. In the interest of maintaining racial diversity (Williams was the only black teacher in the department, and 50% of the students were minorities), the school board voted to lay off Taxman, even though she had a bachelor's degree and Williams had a master's degree. Taxman complained to the Equal Employment Opportunity Commission, saying that the board had violated Title VII of the Civil Rights Act of 1964.

The Third U.S. Circuit Court of Appeals ruled in favor of Taxman. The school board appealed to the United States Supreme Court and a hearing was scheduled for January 1998, but an agreement was reached to pay Taxman a $435,000 settlement before the case could be heard by the court, with a majority of the money coming from civil rights organizations that feared that the Supreme Court could use the case as a justification to eliminate the practice of affirmative action.

Taxman was subsequently rehired. Both teachers returned to teaching in Piscataway. Williams went back to the high school, while Taxman was reassigned to Conackamack Middle School.

== Athletics ==
The Piscataway High School teams are known as the Chiefs and wear the school colors of black and gold. The school is primarily known for football, basketball, and volleyball. The Chiefs compete in the Greater Middlesex Conference (GMC), which is comprised of public and private high schools located in the greater Middlesex County area and operates under the supervision of the New Jersey State Interscholastic Athletic Association (NJSIAA). With 1,715 students in grades 10-12, the school was classified by the NJSIAA for the 2019–20 school year as Group IV for most athletic competition purposes, which included schools with an enrollment of 1,060 to 5,049 students in that grade range. The football team competes in Division 5D of the Big Central Football Conference, which includes 60 public and private high schools in Hunterdon, Middlesex, Somerset, Union and Warren counties, which are broken down into 10 divisions by size and location. The school was classified by the NJSIAA as Group V North for football for 2024–2026, which included schools with 1,317 to 5,409 students.

The football team has won the Central Jersey Group IV titles in 1974, 1981 and 2002, and won the North II Group IV state sectional championships in 2003, 2004, 2008, 2010 and 2011, the Central Group V title in 2016 and the North II Group V in 2018. The 1974 team won in one of the first seven games of the playoff era, defeating Colonia High School by a score of 14-7 in the championship game played indoors at Atlantic City Conventional Hall. In 1981, the team won the Central Jersey Group IV title with a 20-0 win against Middletown High School South in the finals. The 2002 team won the Central Jersey Group IV sectional title with a 14-7 win against Hunterdon Central Regional High School, earning consideration from the Courier News as one of "the best in GMC history". In 2004, the team finished with a 12-0 record after winning the North II Group IV title against Phillipsburg High School in overtime by a score of 27-26. In 2008, the team finished the season at 11-1 after winning the North II Group IV state sectional title by a score of 38-0 in the championship game against Hunterdon Central Regional High School, after losing to them in the finals in 2007. Piscataway football won the 2010 North II Group IV state sectional title by a score of 34–6 over Hunterdon Central; The Chiefs finished the season undefeated at 12-0, marking the third time the team has gone undefeated in school history, and set a program record with 412 points scored that season. In 2011, Piscataway beat Elizabeth High School 41–34 with 17 seconds left to earn the North II Group IV title for the Chiefs. 2011 marked the 15th consecutive year that Piscataway had made the playoffs. In 2016, the team won the Central Jersey Group V title with a 34–13 win against Manalapan High School in the tournament final. In 2018, the team won the North II Group V state sectional championship with a 28-7 win against Union City High School and went on to finish the season with a 13-0 record with a 31-21 win against Ridgewood High School in the North Group V bowl game.

Piscataway's football prowess both against other high school teams and in putting players into the NFL has led to the school's colloquial title, "NFL High School." During the 2004–05 academic year, seven future NFL players played for Piscataway at the same time. In a two-year span, three Piscataway players were drafted in the first round of the NFL draft- the first high school in history with such a record.

The boys' basketball team won the Group IV state title in 1994, defeating Teaneck High School by a score of 60-47 in the finals of the tournament. The 2008 boys' basketball team won the North II, Group IV state sectional championship with a 58–47 win over Linden High School in the tournament final.

In the program's third appearance in the finals, the 1997 girls basketball team won the Group IV state championship with a 59-51 victory against Elizabeth High School in the tournament final and advanced into the Tournament of Champions as the second seed, edging third-seeded Haddonfield Memorial High School by a score of 45-44 in the semifinals before falling to top-seed St. John Vianney High School 53-47 in the finals at the Rutgers Athletic Center to finish the season with a record of 29-2.

The girls' outdoor track and field team won the Group IV state championship in 2005.

The girls' track team won the Group IV indoor relay championship in 2006.

The boys' wrestling team won the North II Group V state sectional championship in 2017.

== Superchief Marching Band ==
PHS is home to the Piscataway Superchiefs, a marching band with a very rich history. The band has achieved much through its years, including numerous USSBA Championships. The band began as a small group in the 1950s and existed with little or no fanfare. Starting in 1971 led by Band Directors R. Bruce Bradshaw and Joseph T. Mundi it quickly grew from 44 members to 204 members and consistently represents nearly 10% of the entire school's student body, year after year. The Superchiefs have recorded music for CBS, The Walt Disney Company, and were in the 2002 Macy's Thanksgiving Day Parade. Famed percussion instructor Dennis DeLucia previously wrote and arranged the percussion music for the drumline, but has since parted ways with the band.

Over the years the Superchiefs have been featured in several TV shows, including American Oompah and The Superchiefs Go To Ireland for PBS, Mario And The Magic Movie Machine for CBS, and Today in New York for NBC. The band has performed at numerous halftimes for the New York Giants, New York Jets, Washington Redskins, and Buffalo Bills, as well as pre—game ceremonies for the New York Mets. The band has also worked for the Walt Disney Company at the Radio City Music Hall premier of Pete's Dragon and Mickey's 50th Birthday Whistlestop tour at Penn Station in Midtown Manhattan.

In the 1980s, the band garnered international acclaim, touring Ireland in 1981 and 1985 and capturing first place in the Dublin and Limerick St. Patrick's Day Parades on each trip. The band continued its success on a national level as well, taking first place at the World of Music Festival in San Diego, California in 1983 and 1987, and at the Festivals of Music in Orlando, Florida in 1989. They also won consecutive New York City St. Patrick's Day Parades early in the decade, and they continued to be locally successful, placing first in numerous shows around the slate. They won the first-over Tropicana Bowl Mid-Atlantic Championship at Rutgers Stadium in 1983. and the first-ever CMBC (USSBA) competition at Giants Stadium in 1988, featuring top-level bands from the Tri-State Region.

During the 1990s the Superchiefs have focused on the CMBC (USSBA) circuit that features some of the finest bands in the Eastern United States. The band has won live consecutive Group V Open Championships, from 1990 through 1994. and again in 1996. In addition, the band has placed in five Bands of America Eastern Regional Finals Championships in 1996. 1997, 1998, 2002, and 2003 and won the Yamaha Corporation's Yamaha Cup Preview of Champions in 2001 & 2002. In 2002, the Superchiefs also look first place in the USSBA New Jersey state championships. This was the first-ever 'State Champions' title awarded to the band.

Another first in the history of the Superchiefs, the band was invited to perform in the 2002 Macy's Thanksgiving Day Parade, which aired on NBC on November 28, 2002. Since then, the band has continued its successes and its quest for excellence which has been upheld by "excellent" ratings at the New Jersey State Band Festivals, 3rd-place finish at the USSBA Championships in 2004, and special recognition award by the New Jersey State Board of Education. Additionally, the township was declared one of the "Best 100 Communities for Music Education in America 2005" by the American Music Conference. In 2007, the Superchiefs went to Orlando, Florida to participate in the Walt Disney World parade.

== Administration ==
The school's principal is Christopher Baldassano. His core administration team includes four assistant principals.

== Notable alumni ==
- Mike Alexander (born 1965), former wide receiver who played in the NFL for the Los Angeles Raiders and Buffalo Bills.
- Justin Bailey (born 1977), former professional basketball player who played collegiately for Hartford before playing overseas for 13 years as a professional in Europe, Australia, New Zealand, Mexico, Kazakhstan and Russia.
- Marvin Booker (born 1990, class of 2008), player for the Tampa Bay Buccaneers.
- Anthony Branker (born 1958, class of 1976), musician and educator.
- John Celestand (born 1977), basketball player who played collegiately for Villanova, second-round selection of the Los Angeles Lakers in 1999 NBA draft.
- Mark Ciardi (born 1961, class of 1979), film producer and former Major League Baseball pitcher.
- Anthony Davis (born 1989, class of 2007), offensive tackle for the San Francisco 49ers.
- Dwayne Gratz (born 1989), cornerback for the Jacksonville Jaguars of the National Football League.
- J. D. Griggs (born 1990, class of 2008), defensive end for the Winnipeg Blue Bombers of the Canadian Football League.
- Henry Horne (class of 1971), former basketball player
- Malcolm Jenkins (born 1987, class of 2005), free safety who has played in the NFL for the New Orleans Saints and Philadelphia Eagles.
- Asjha Jones (born 1980), WNBA basketball player for the Connecticut Sun.
- Richard Levis McCormick (born 1947, class of 1965), President of Rutgers University.
- Mark Meseroll (1955–2018), American football tackle who played in the NFL for the New Orleans Saints.
- Steven Miller (born 1991, class of 2009), running back who played for the Saskatchewan Roughriders of the Canadian Football League and the Detroit Lions of the National Football League.
- Brandon Renkart (born 1984), former American football linebacker.
- Paul Rudnick (born 1957), playwright.
- Tajae Sharpe (born 1994), wide receiver for the Tennessee Titans and Atlanta Falcons.
- Kyle Wilson (born 1987, class of 2005), cornerback who has played for the New York Jets.
- Eric Young Jr. (born 1985), infielder for the Los Angeles Angels of Major League Baseball.
- Josiah Zayas (class of 2026), college football cornerback for the Penn State Nittany Lions
