= Siemens Hearing Instruments =

Company in Piscataway, New Jersey, USA

Sivantos Inc.
- Type: Private
- Industry: Hearing instruments
- Predecessor: Siemens Hearing Instruments
- Founded: 1878
- Headquarters: Piscataway, New Jersey, United States
- Parent: WS Audiology
- Website: www.signia.net/en-us/

Sivantos, Inc. (formerly Siemens Hearing Instruments) is the United States affiliate of Sivantos Group, which maintains a global headquarters in Singapore. Sivantos Group (formerly Siemens Audiology Group, a division of Siemens Healthcare) manufactures hearing aids. They serve hearing care professionals in more than 120 countries, offering hearing aids branded Siemens, Signia, Audio Service, Rexton, and A&M. Sivantos, Inc., and is located in Piscataway, NJ, where approximately 500 employees work in manufacturing, research and development, sales, marketing finance, and customer care.

Siemens Hearing Instruments changed its name in 2015 to Sivantos, Inc. when Sivantos Group was spun off from Siemens Audiology Solutions after Siemens AG sold the company to EQT VI and Santo Holding GmbH.

On March 1, 2019, Singapore-headquartered Sivantos Group joined forces with Lynge/Denmark-based Widex to form WSA.
