= Mark Meseroll =

American football player (1955–2018)

No. 70
- Position: Tackle

Personal information
- Born: July 22, 1955; Knoxville, Tennessee
- Died: November 17, 2018 (aged 63); Salisbury, North Carolina
- Listed height: 6 ft 5 in (1.96 m)
- Listed weight: 270 lb (122 kg)

Career information
- High school: Piscataway Township (NJ)
- College: Wesley, Florida State
- NFL draft: 1978: undrafted

Career history
- New Orleans Saints (1978)
- Stats at Pro Football Reference

Mark Meseroll (July 22, 1955 – November 17, 2018) was an American football tackle. He played in 16 games for the New Orleans Saints in 1978.

He died on November 17, 2018, in Salisbury, North Carolina at age 63.
