= Anthony Branker =

American musician

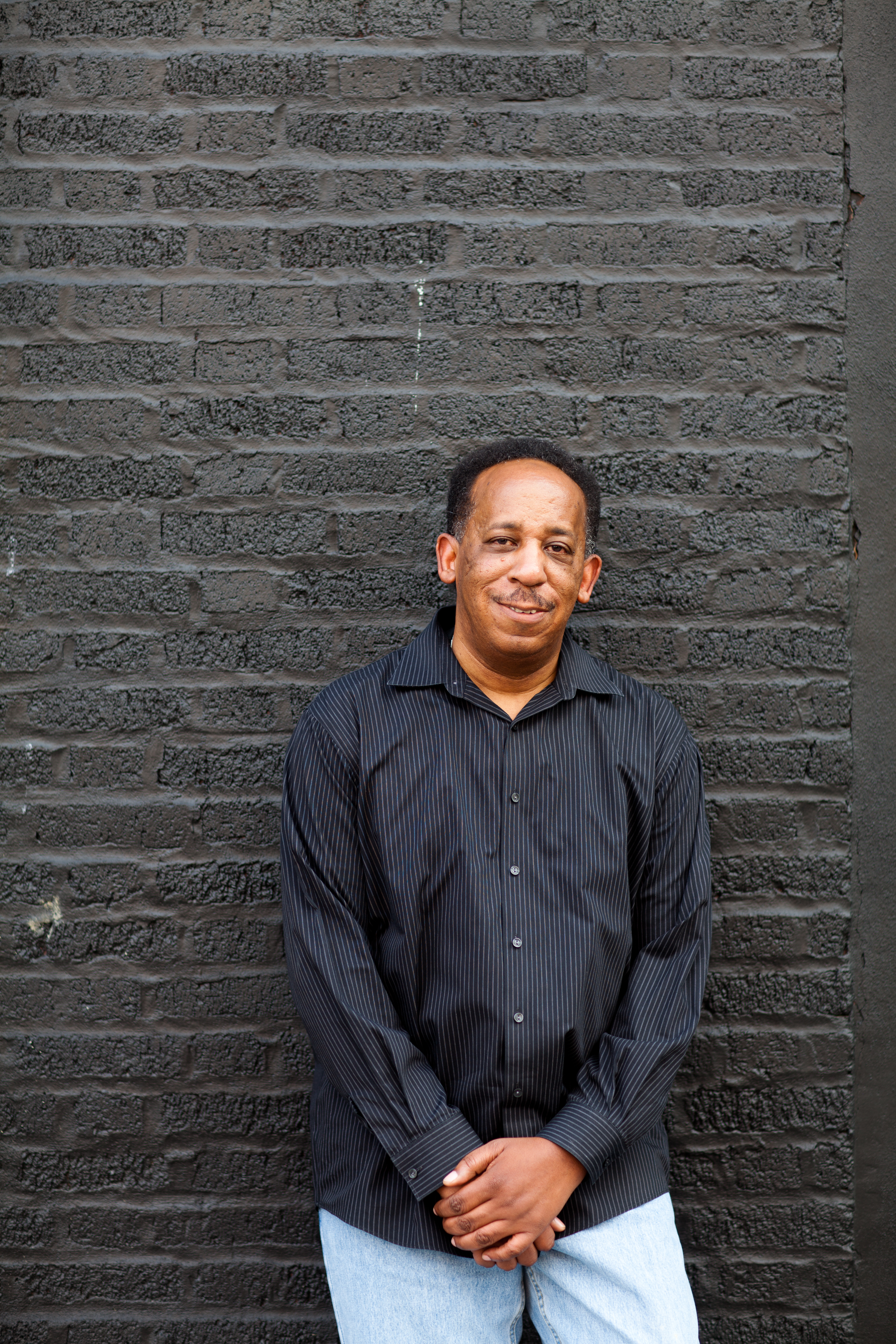
Composer Anthony Branker in Brooklyn, New York (2012)

Anthony Branker (born August 28, 1958) is an American musician and educator of Caribbean descent.

He was born in Elizabeth, New Jersey and raised in Piscataway and Plainfield, New Jersey. He attended public schools in Piscataway and graduated from Piscataway Township High School in 1976. where he was involved in the music program under the direction of R. Bruce Bradshaw and Joseph T. Mundi. Following high school, he attended Princeton University where he received his B.A. in music and a Certificate in African American Studies. He attended graduate school at the University of Miami for a Master of Music in Jazz Pedagogy and to Columbia University, Teachers College for a Master of Education and Doctor of Education, both with specialties in Music and Music Education.

== Family background ==
Branker's family is from Trinidad and Barbados, and he is a first-generation American. His uncle Rupert Branker was the music director and pianist with The Platters, while his Uncle Roy was a member of the Copasetics. Roy Branker composed music with Billy Strayhorn, another member of the Copasetics, and was mentioned in Duke Ellington's autobiography, Music is My Mistress. Anthony Branker's cousin, Nicholas Brancker, who spells his last name differently, is from Barbados and is a music producer.

== Music career ==
Branker has recorded for Origin and Sons of Sound Records. His albums include Beauty Within (Origin, 2016),The Forward (Towards Equality) Suite (Origin, 2014), Uppity (Origin, 2013), Together (Origin, 2012), Dialogic (Origin, 2011), Dance Music (Origin, 2010), Blessings (Origin, 2009), and Spirit Songs (Sons of Sound, 2006).

Branker leads three jazz bands: Imagine, Word Play and Ascent, which have featured Fabian Almazan, Ralph Bowen, David Binney, Adam Cruz, Kenny Davis, Tia Fuller, Mark Gross, Antonio Hart, Conrad Herwig, Jonny King, Ralph Peterson Jr., and Steve Wilson. As a trumpeter, he has performed and recorded with the Spirit of Life Ensemble, including a five-year residency at the Sweet Basil Jazz Club. He appeared at the Pori International Jazz Festival (Finland); Leningrad/St. Petersburg International Jazz Festival (Russia); Kaunas International Jazz Festival (Lithuania); Estonia International Jazz Festival (Tartu, Estonia); JVC Jazz Festival at Sweet Basil (New York); Panasonic Village Jazz Festival (New York); as well as jazz club performances in France, Finland, Germany, Russia, and New York. He has shared the stage with Marcus Belgrave, Terence Blanchard, T. K. Blue, Gary Burton, Benny Carter, Michael Cochrane, Ted Curson, Guilherme Franco, Eddie Henderson, Billy Higgins, John Hicks, Stanley Jordan, Roscoe Mitchell, Steve Nelson, Big John Patton, Ralph Peterson Jr., James Weidman, and the R&B group Tavares. He performed in the Off-Broadway production of Dinah Was: The Dinah Washington Musical.

His music has been performed or recorded by Kenny Barron, Alex Blake, Cecil Brooks III, Benny Carter, Sarah Jane Cion, Orrin Evans, Joe Ford, Onaje Allan Gumbs, Winard Harper, Eddie Henderson, John Hicks, Stanley Jordan, Talib Kibwe, Victor Lewis, Curtis Lundy, Steve Nelson, Valery Ponomarev, and the Princeton University Orchestra

In 1999, medical problems from two brain aneurysms and the discovery of an arteriovenous malformation led him to yield his trumpet playing and forced him to take a leave of absence from teaching.

== Conductor ==
As a conductor, Branker has worked with Ralph Bowen, Don Braden, Bryan Carrott, Benny Carter, Ted Curson, Orrin Evans, Jon Faddis, Frank Foster, Guilherme Franco, Mark Gross, Slide Hampton, Antonio Hart, Jimmy Heath, Conrad Herwig, Patience Higgins, Stanley Jordan, Oliver Lake, Rick Margitza, Bob Mintzer, Michael Philip Mossman, Steve Nelson, Ralph Peterson Jr., Valery Ponomarev, Benny Powell, Jeffery Smith, Jacky Terrasson, Clark Terry, Bobby Watson, Phil Woods.

Branker conducted trumpeter Terence Blanchard's score for A Tale of God's Will (A Requiem for Katrina). In 2014, Branker conducted Wynton Marsalis' "Abyssinian 200: A Gospel Celebration" featuring the Princeton University Glee Club and University Concert Jazz Ensemble. He has also led the Princeton University Orchestra in the world premiere of his composition "Ballad for Trayvon Martin" for Orchestra and Jazz Quartet featuring tenor saxophonist Ralph Bowen, as well as in world premieres of two dance works choreographed to the orchestral music of Claude Debussy's "La Boite a Joujoux (The Toy Box)" – including the U.S. Premiere of Debussy's "jazz overture" for this work – and John Alden Carpenter's "Krazy Kat." Branker has also conducted Princeton's Orchestra in performances of Ellington's extended orchestral compositions "A Tone Parallel to Harlem" and "New World A Comin'." In addition, he has conducted "The Sacred Concert Music of Duke Ellington" with the Hunter College (CUNY) Jazz Repertory Orchestra as well as with the Princeton University Chapel Choir, Glee Club and Gospel Ensemble, and has conducted the Ellington/Strayhorn collaborative adaptations of Peter Ilyich Tchaikovsky's "Nutcracker Suite" and Edvard Grieg's "Peer Gynt Suites Nos. 1 & 2" for big band.

Branker has conducted several world premieres of commissioned works for big band, that have included Michael Philip Mossman's "John Coltrane Suite"; Bob Mintzer's "March Majestic"; Jimmy Heath's "For the Love Of"; Ralph Bowen's "Little Miss B"; Conrad Herwig's "Reflections of a Man Facing South"; Randy Bauer's "Wide-Eyed Wonder"; and Laurie Altman's "In Another Time" for orchestra, big band and vocal ensemble. Branker has also collaborated with the Juilliard Jazz Orchestra and Wycliffe Gordon, Loren Schoenberg, and Cecil Bridgewater on big band performances of Duke Ellington and Billy Strayhorn's Far East Suite and Ellington's New Orleans Suite at McCarter Theatre in Princeton.

Branker has appeared as conductor with the Jugend Sinfonie Orchester (Bremen, Germany), Israel's Kiryat Ono Symphonic Youth Band, Japan's Fukui Junior Orchestra, Estonian Academy of Music Big Band (Tallinn, Estonia), Tallinn University of Technology Big Band (Tallinn, Estonia), Hunter Jazz Repertory Orchestra (New York), Rutgers University Mason Gross School of the Arts Jazz Ensemble, the New Jersey High School All State Jazz Ensemble, the New Jersey Intercollegiate Big Band, the Connecticut Western Region Jazz Band, and the Independent School Music Association of New York City All-City High School Honors Big Band.

== Educator ==
Branker joined the jazz studies faculty at the Mason Gross School of the Arts at Rutgers University as an adjunct professor. His responsibilities include two graduate seminars in Jazz Historiography (I & II), two graduate seminars in Jazz Composition & Arranging (I & II), a Jazz Theory course for undergraduates, and directing the Avant Garde Ensemble. Branker previously served as a visiting conductor at Rutgers . In 2016, he retired from Princeton, where he was a member of the faculty for 27 years, held an endowed chair in jazz studies, and served as founding director of Jazz Studies, director of university jazz ensembles program, and associate director of Musical Performance. He directed ensembles and taught courses in jazz theory, improvisation, composition, and performance.

He was a Fulbright Scholar and visiting professor at the Estonian Academy of Music and Theatre in Tallinn, Estonia and has been a member of the faculty at the Manhattan School of Music, Rutgers University/Mason Gross School of the Arts, Hunter College, Ursinus College, The Hill School, and the New Jersey Summer Arts Institute. He was a visiting composer at the Southern Danish Academy of Music and Dramatic Arts in Esbjerg, Denmark; Hochschule fur Musik und Theater Hamburg; Estonian Academy of Music and Theatre. He has lectured at Helsinki Polytechnic Stadia in Helsinki, Finland; Õismäe Russian Lyceum, Tallinn, Estonia; Heino Eller Tartu Music College, Tartu, Estonia; Kuressaare Music Academy on the Estonian island of Saaremaa; Viljandi Kultuuriakadeemia Muusikamajas in Viljandi, Estonia; Winmalee High School, Blue Mountains, Australia; Rutgers University; Plexus Institute; and Drew University.

In 2008, Princeton University received a multimillion-dollar gift to enhance the study and performance of jazz. As a result of this contribution to jazz studies, Branker established the Certificate Program in Jazz Studies at Princeton. During Branker's 27-year career at Princeton (1989-2016), the ensemble program featured two 17-piece big bands and small groups which have included the Jazz Composers Collective, Jazz Vocal Collective, Free to Be Ensemble, and Crossing Borders Improvisational Music Ensemble. The Princeton jazz program has recorded several albums under Branker's direction: Telling Stories (Free to Be Ensemble), Love Is What It Is (Jazz Vocal Collective), Onwards (Jazz Composers Collective), Blue/Yellow Dances (Jazz Composers Collective), Expanding Horizons (Jazz Composers Collective), Yesternow: The Princeton University Jazz Program 1989-2004 compilation CD (Concert Jazz Ensemble, Monk Mingus Ensemble, Ensemble X, Hard Bop Ensemble & Afro-Groove Ensemble), It's All About the Groove (Afro-Groove Ensemble & Fusion Ensemble), Sounds From The Free-Thinking (Monk/Mingus Ensemble) with guest trumpet soloist and former Mingus band member Ted Curson, Music From the Sacred Concerts of Edward Kennedy Ellington (Concert Jazz Ensemble and Chapel Choir), What's Going On? (Ensemble X), Mosaic (Concert Jazz Ensemble & Hard Bop Ensemble), The Sacred Concert Music of Duke Ellington (Concert Jazz Ensemble, Glee Club and Gospel Ensemble), Mean What You Say (Concert Jazz Ensemble), and 7 Steps 2 Heaven (Concert Jazz Ensemble).

Branker has attended conferences at, or been published by, the International Society for Music Education, International Society for Improvised Music, Research in Music Education, International Symposium on Assessment in Music Education, College Music Society, International Jazz Composers Symposium, International Association for Jazz Education, Foundation for Educational Administration (FEA) / New Jersey Principals and Supervisors Association School Leadership Conference, New Jersey Music Educators Association (NJMEA)], the Princeton University Regional Conference – "Big Ideas: Science, Innovation, and Discovery," and Down Beat magazine. Branker was named to the College Music Society's Advisory Council on Improvisation and has served as program scholar for Looking At: Jazz, America's Art Form, a six-part documentary film viewing and discussion series at the Princeton Public Library.

== Awards and honors ==
- Three Gold Medals for Beauty Within, Global Music Awards.
- Rising Star Composer, DownBeat magazine, 2014, 2015
- Fellowships or grants from the J. William Fulbright Foreign Scholarship Board/Council for International Exchange of Scholars, the National Endowment for the Humanities, Rutgers Institute of Jazz Studies, Princeton University, and Ursinus College
- Keynote speaker for University of Jyvaskyla Music Education Research Seminar in Jyvaskyla, Finland

== Discography ==
- For the Children (RPC, 1980)
- Spirit Songs (Sons of Sound, 2005)
- Blessings (Origin, 2009)
- Dance Music (Origin, 2010)
- Dialogic (Origin, 2011)
- Together (Origin, 2012)
- Uppity (Origin, 2013)
- The Forward (Towards Equality) Suite (Origin, 2014)
- Beauty Within (Origin, 2016)
- What Place Can Be For Us? A Suite in Ten Movements (Origin, 2023)
- Songs My Mom Liked (Origin, 2024)
