= J. D. Griggs =

American gridiron football player (born 1990)

No. 57 – Beaumont Renegades
- Position: Defensive end
- Roster status: Active

Personal information
- Born: November 5, 1990 (age 36); Piscataway, New Jersey, U.S.
- Listed height: 6 ft 5 in (1.96 m)
- Listed weight: 244 lb (111 kg)

Career information
- High school: Piscataway Township (NJ)
- College: Akron
- NFL draft: 2013: undrafted

Career history
- Jacksonville Jaguars (2013)*; Winnipeg Blue Bombers (2013); Colorado Crush (2016); Spokane Empire (2017); Massachusetts Pirates (2018–2021); Frisco Fighters (2022–2023); Beaumont Renegades (2025-present)
- * Offseason or practice squad member only

Awards and highlights
- First Team All-IFL (2017); 1st-Team All-NAL (2018,2019)

Career CFL statistics
- Total tackles: 2
- Stats at CFL.ca (archived)

John D. Griggs (born November 5, 1990) is an American football defensive end for the Beaumont Renegades of the National Arena League (NAL). He played college football for the University of Akron. He went undrafted during the 2013 NFL draft, and signed as an undrafted free agent with the Jacksonville Jaguars.

== Early life ==
Griggs grew up in Piscataway, New Jersey, where he graduated in 2008 from Piscataway Township High School, having played for the basketball and football teams, receiving All-State honors in each sport.

== College career ==
=== Iowa ===
Griggs enrolled in the University of Iowa, where he played for the Iowa Hawkeyes football team from 2008 to 2010.

=== Nassau ===
Griggs enrolled at Nassau Community College, where he played football in 2010.

=== Akron ===
Griggs enrolled in the University of Akron, where he played for the Akron Zips football team from 2011 to 2012.

== Professional career ==
=== Jacksonville Jaguars ===
After going undrafted during the 2013 NFL draft, Griggs signed with the Jacksonville Jaguars as an undrafted free agent. He was released on August 25, 2013.

=== Winnipeg Blue Bombers ===
Griggs signed with the Winnipeg Blue Bombers of the Canadian Football League in 2013.

=== Colorado Crush ===
Griggs played in 9 games with the Colorado Crush during the 2016 season.

=== Spokane Empire ===
On February 9, 2017, Griggs signed with the Spokane Empire. Griggs was named First-team All-Indoor Football League in 2017. Led the IFL in sacks and tackles for loss in 2017.

=== Massachusetts Pirates ===
Griggs signed with the Massachusetts Pirates of the National Arena League for the 2018 season where he was named 1st-Team All-NAL while recording 8.5 sacks and 1 forced fumble. During the 2019 season, Griggs recorded 9.5 sacks while being named 1st-Team All-NAL for the second consecutive year. The 2020 season was canceled due to COVID-19 and Griggs resigned with the Massachusetts Pirates for the 2021 season. He appeared in 15 games while recording 2.5 sacks, 2 TDs, 9 pass breakups, 14 tackles for loss, 4 block kicks. He was a key factor in winning the 2021 Indoor Football League United Bowl.

=== Frisco Fighters ===
On December 16, 2021, Griggs signed with the Frisco Fighters of the Indoor Football League (IFL). On October 24, 2022, Griggs was released by the Fighters. On January 13, 2023, Griggs re-signed with the Fighters for the 2023 season.
