= Mike Alexander (gridiron football) =

American football player (born 1965)

No. 89, 86, 5
- Position: Wide receiver

Personal information
- Born: March 19, 1965 (age 61); New York, New York, U.S.
- Listed height: 6 ft 3 in (1.91 m)
- Listed weight: 205 lb (93 kg)

Career information
- High school: Piscataway Township (Piscataway, New Jersey)
- College: Penn State
- NFL draft: 1988: 8th round, 199th overall pick

Career history
- Los Angeles Raiders (1988–1990); Buffalo Bills (1991); Los Angeles Raiders (1992)*; San Francisco 49ers (1993)*; Baltimore Stallions (1994–1995)
- * Offseason or practice squad member only

Awards and highlights
- National champion (1986)

Career NFL statistics
- Receptions: 16
- Receiving yards: 302
- Touchdowns: 1
- Stats at Pro Football Reference

Michael Fitzgerald Alexander (born March 19, 1965) is an American former professional football player who played for the Los Angeles Raiders and Buffalo Bills of the National Football League (NFL). After his career in the NFL, he went on to play for the Baltimore Stallions of the Canadian Football League (CFL). Alexander played collegiately at Penn State University and attended Piscataway Township High School in Piscataway, New Jersey.

== Professional career ==
Alexander was the eighth round draft pick (#199 overall) of the Los Angeles Raiders in the 1988 NFL draft. He debuted for the Raiders in 1989. Alexander became a free agent after the 1989 season and resigned with the Raiders. He was released as part of the team's final cuts in 1991. Alexander played with the Buffalo Bills in 1991.

From 1992 to 1994, Alexander was signed by several NFL teams but didn't play in any regular season games. He returned to the Raiders for training camp in 1992 but was released before the regular season. In 1993, Alexander attended training camp with the San Francisco 49ers. He briefly signed with the Calgary Stampeders of the CFL before returning to the Los Angeles Raiders for the summer of 1994.

From 1994 to 1995, Alexander played ten games for the short-lived Baltimore Stallions of the CFL. He recorded four tackles on special teams and caught three passes for 71 yards and a touchdown. He was released from the Stallions in July 1995.
