= Brandon Renkart =

American football player (born 1984)

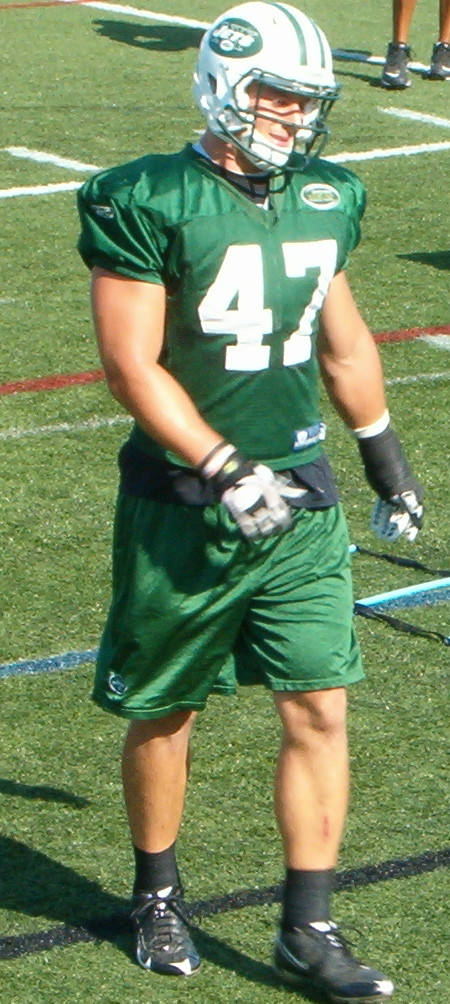
- Renkart with the Jets in 2009

Profile
- Position: Linebacker

Personal information
- Born: December 29, 1984 (age 41); Piscataway, New Jersey, U.S.
- Listed height: 6 ft 2 in (1.88 m)
- Listed weight: 245 lb (111 kg)

Career information
- College: Rutgers
- NFL draft: 2008: undrafted

Career history
- New York Jets (2008–2009)*; Arizona Cardinals (2009)*; Indianapolis Colts (2009–2010)*; Pittsburgh Steelers (2010)*
- * Offseason or practice squad member only

Brandon Renkart (born December 29, 1984) is an American former professional football player who was a linebacker in the National Football League (NFL). He played college football for the Rutgers Scarlet Knights. He was also a practice squad player for the New York Jets and Arizona Cardinals.

== Early life ==
Renkart grew up in Piscataway, New Jersey and played at Piscataway Township High School, where he quarterbacked the football team to a 12–0 record and the Group IV State title as a senior.

== College football ==
Renkart played college football as a walk-on at Rutgers from 2005 to 2007. He tallied 54 tackles in 2006 and 67 in 2007. As a senior, he was selected as a team captain. He was also a semifinalist for the Draddy Award in 2007.

== Professional career ==
=== New York Jets ===
Renkart was signed by the New York Jets as an undrafted free agent after the 2008 NFL draft. He spent most of the 2008 season on their Practice Squad before being cut during final roster cuts before the 2009 season.

=== Arizona Cardinals ===
After being released by the Jets, Renkart signed for the Arizona Cardinals. He spent most of the 2009 season on their Practice Squad before being signed off the Cardinals' Practice Squad by the Indianapolis Colts.

=== Indianapolis Colts ===
Renkart signed with the Indianapolis Colts on 30 December 2009; he was waived on 17 June 2010 to make room for kicker Garrett Lindholm, whom they signed off waivers from the Atlanta Falcons.

=== Pittsburgh Steelers ===
The Pittsburgh Steelers signed Renkart on August 12, 2010, after linebacker Andre Frazier was placed on injured reserve.
