= Steven Miller (running back) =

American gridiron football player (born 1991)

No. 10
- Position: Running back

Personal information
- Born: March 23, 1991 (age 35); Plainfield, New Jersey, U.S.
- Listed height: 5 ft 7 in (1.70 m)
- Listed weight: 172 lb (78 kg)

Career information
- High school: Piscataway Township
- College: Appalachian State

Career history
- 2013–2014: Detroit Lions*
- 2014–2015: Saskatchewan Roughriders
- 2015: Winnipeg Blue Bombers*
- * Offseason or practice squad member only
- Stats at Pro Football Reference
- Stats at CFL.ca (archive)

Steven Miller (born March 23, 1991) is an American former professional football running back who played for the Saskatchewan Roughriders of the Canadian Football League from 2014 to 2015. He was also a member of the Detroit Lions of the National Football League, and the Winnipeg Blue Bombers of the CFL.

== Early career ==
Miller grew up in Piscataway, New Jersey and attended Piscataway High School where he played high school football for the Chiefs, graduating in 2009. In 2008, he ran for 1,322 yards and 20 touchdowns. The Chiefs won the 2008 North Jersey, Section 2, Group 4 championship in his senior year.

Miller played college football for Nassau Community College in 2009 and 2010. In 2010, he won Northeast Football Conference Player of the Year and Offensive Player of the Year and helped lead Nassau to the conference championship. He recorded 1,180 rushing yards and 12 rushing touchdowns in his final year with Nassau. In 2011, he transferred to Appalachian State where he played for the Mountaineers. In his senior year, he rushed for over 1,368 yards on 239 carries and 11 touchdowns. Additionally, he recorded 34 receptions for 377 yards and an additional four touchdowns.

== Professional career ==
In April 2013, Miller was signed to the Detroit Lions as an undrafted free agent. He spent 2013 on the Lions' practice squad, and was cut in 2014 after playing in three preseason games.

Miller was signed by the Saskatchewan Roughriders in October 2014. He played in two regular season games and a post-season game. In the regular season, he ran for 68 yards on 12 carries and acted as a kickoff returner.
