= WVPH =

Radio station in Piscataway, New Jersey

- Piscataway, New Jersey; United States
- Broadcast area: Middlesex County, New Jersey
- Frequency: 90.3 MHz

Programming
- Format: Variety

Ownership
- Owner: Piscataway Board of Education

History
- Founded: 1971
- Call sign meaning: Voice of Piscataway High

Technical information
- Licensing authority: FCC
- Facility ID: 52686
- Class: A
- ERP: 100 watts
- HAAT: 77.4 meters
- Transmitter coordinates: 40°31′21.00″N 74°25′52.50″W

Links
- Public license information: Public file; LMS
- Webcast: 64k AAC+ 128k MP3
- Website: thecore.fm

WVPH (90.3 FM, "The Core") is Piscataway, New Jersey's community and student-run radio station.

== Background ==
The slogan is "Many voices, one station", and is a commercial free, freeform radio station, where the disc jockey can play and say whatever they want, as long as it goes by FCC rules and regulations (such as no on air profanity).

It is a broadcasting agreement between the former WRLC AM station from Rutgers, Livingston College and WVPH-FM from Piscataway High School. The two institutions combined forces in 1997 to create an educational opportunity and provide an outlet for both entertainment and information. This radio station is self-governed with help from the two schools and the community. It is student-run, and community members can join the station as DJs.

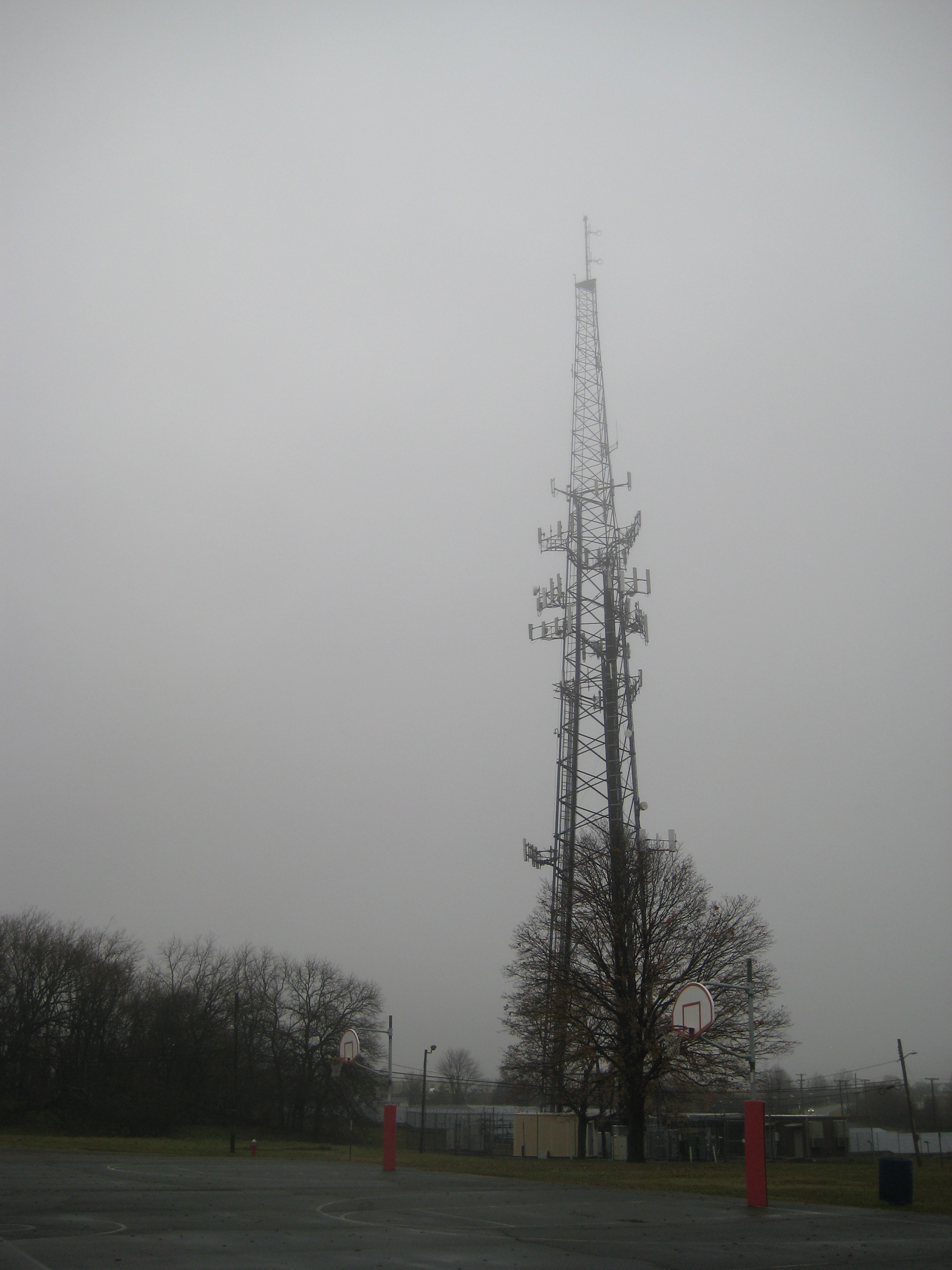
The new transmitter.

WVPH's transmitter is now located on a communications tower on the Livingston campus of Rutgers University. It was previously located on the roof of Piscataway High School. The transmitter was moved on October 6, 2007, following a day of stunting that led up to the transmitter move. The new coverage area reaches over 85% more people than the old coverage area.

In 2009, The Core conducted a live three-day broadcast from the All Points West Festival in Jersey City, New Jersey. DJs facilitated interviews and organized performances in the facility..

The Core has won awards for several years from the Intercollegiate Broadcasting System.

== Music ==
The Core has several music departments including: Rock, Heavy (Metal Music), Electronic, Hip Hop, R&B, Blues, Jazz, Local, Folk Music, and World Music. Being located near New Brunswick, a college town, the Core is well known among students, as well as the underground music scene.

Many local bands have affiliated themselves with the Core, by recording in the studio, performing in Core-organized concerts, or joining the Core as DJs. The music departments are in charge of contacting promoters for new music, reviewing albums, and adding albums into the musical playlists. New music comes in from promoters, either in digital or physical disk form. It is then reviewed and added into the WideOrbit system by the music departments as a playlist, which is a database that allows DJs to play songs on command in addition to pre-recorded announcements, PSAs, and IDs. Each DJ show (unless it is a specialty show) is required to play 6 different playlist songs every hour, which helps diversify the music listened to by the jockeys.

The music departments as well as any DJ is allowed to review albums, review concerts, and interview artists.

Some bands that have been affiliated with the Core include: Japanese Breakfast, The Hotelier, Petal, and A Great Big Pile of Leaves.

== Corefest ==
Every year since 2011, the Core hosts a music festival at Rutgers called Corefest, with headlines, subheadliners, and local bands.

== See also ==
- WRSU-FM: Rutgers station in New Brunswick
