= Anthony Davis (offensive tackle, born 1989) =

American football player (born 1989)

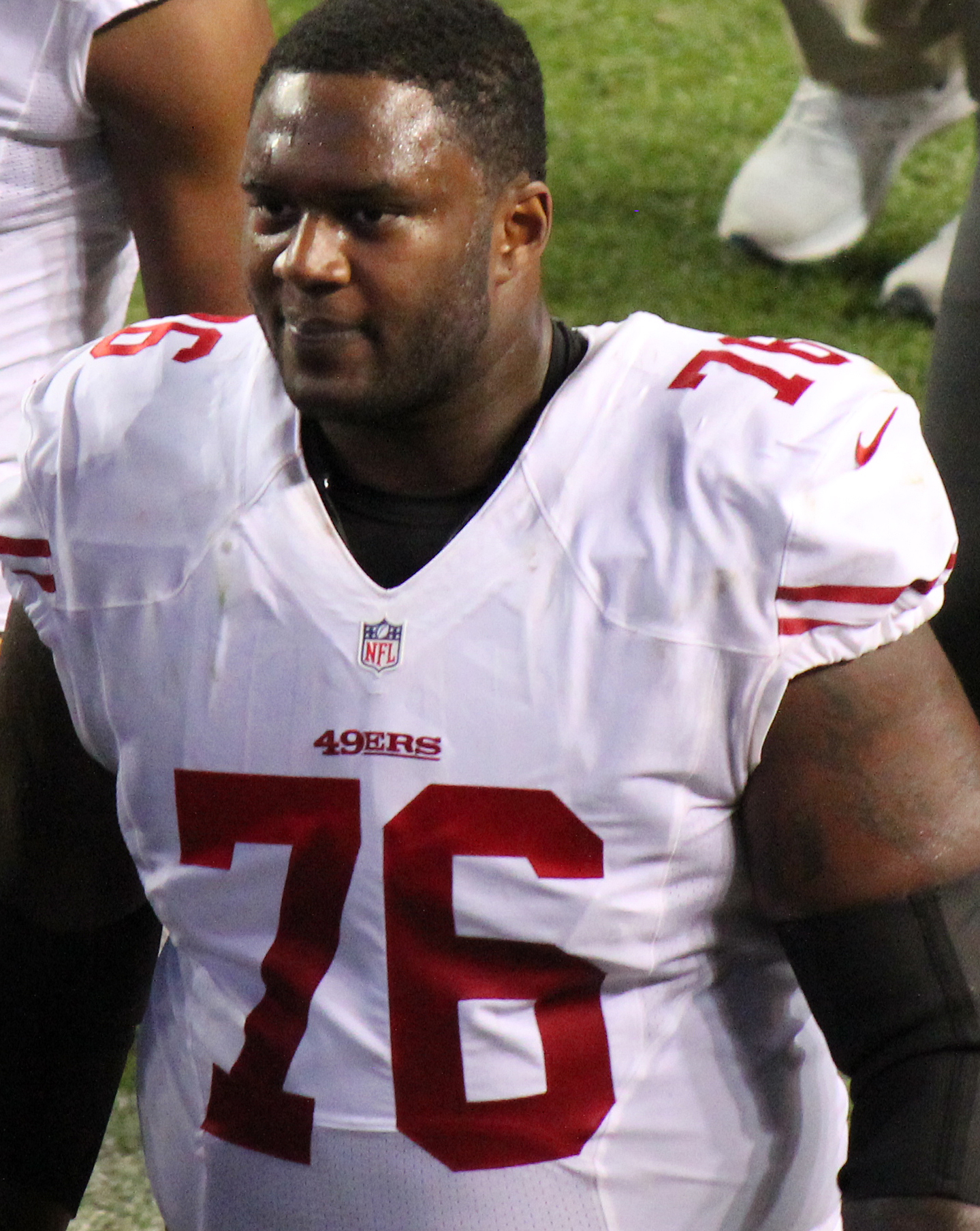
- Davis with the San Francisco 49ers in 2014

No. 76
- Position: Offensive tackle

Personal information
- Born: October 11, 1989 (age 37); Piscataway, New Jersey, U.S.
- Listed height: 6 ft 5 in (1.96 m)
- Listed weight: 323 lb (147 kg)

Career information
- High school: Piscataway Township (Piscataway)
- College: Rutgers (2007–2009)
- NFL draft: 2010: 1st round, 11th overall pick

Career history
- San Francisco 49ers (2010–2014, 2016)

Awards and highlights
- Madden Most Valuable Protectors Award (2012); Second-team All-American (2009); 2× First-team All-Big East (2008, 2009); Freshman All-American (2007)

Career NFL statistics
- Games played: 72
- Games started: 71
- Stats at Pro Football Reference

Anthony Nathaniel Davis (born October 11, 1989) is an American former professional football player who was an offensive tackle for the San Francisco 49ers of the National Football League (NFL). He played college football for the Rutgers Scarlet Knights and was selected by the 49ers in the first round of the 2010 NFL draft.

== Early life ==
Davis attended Piscataway Township High School in New Jersey, where he played for the Piscataway Chiefs high school football team. He was a three-year starter and recorded more than 70 pancake blocks for his career. In his sophomore season, Davis was a teammate to fellow NFL players Kyle Wilson, and Malcolm Jenkins and helped the team to an undefeated season, and its third consecutive state title. Davis played in the U.S. Army All-American Bowl and was earned First-team All-American honors by USA Today.

Considered a four-star recruit by Rivals.com, Davis was listed as the No. 1 offensive tackle prospect in the nation. He was also listed as the top prospect coming out of high school in the nation. He was also regarded as the top prospect from New Jersey and received over 50 scholarship offers, he chose Rutgers over Ohio State, becoming the first No. 1 prospect from New Jersey to sign with head coach Greg Schiano at Rutgers, and the highest rated since Nate Robinson in 2003.

== College career ==
In his freshman year at Rutgers, Davis played in all 13 games on the year. He was named starting right guard for the sixth game of the season and started the final eight games of the 2007 season. He earned First-team Freshman All-American honors by the Football Writers Association of America, The Sporting News and Rivals.com, and Second-team All-American laurels from Scout.com.

Davis was moved to left tackle before the 2008 season, and started 12 games at that position. He was named to the Second-team All-Big East by the league's head coaches and a First-team All-Big East honoree by the media.

In 2009, Davis was First-team All-Big East and Second-team All-America.

== Professional career ==
Pre-draft measurables
Height	Weight	Arm length	Hand span	40-yard dash	10-yard split	20-yard split	20-yard shuttle	Three-cone drill	Vertical jump	Broad jump	Bench press
6 ft 5 in (1.96 m)	323 lb (147 kg)	34 in (0.86 m)	10 1/8 in (0.26 m)	5.37 s	1.82 s	3.01 s	4.97 s	8.17 s	33.0 in (0.84 m)	8 ft 3 in (2.51 m)	21 reps
All values from NFL Combine

After the 2009 St. Petersburg Bowl, Davis said on the field that he scheduled a news conference for December 22, to announce his NFL plans. At that news conference, he declared his intentions to enter the 2010 NFL draft, and said he would hire an agent.

Davis was drafted in the first round with the 11th overall pick by the San Francisco 49ers after the 49ers traded up from the 13th overall pick with the Denver Broncos in order to select Davis. On July 30, 2010, Davis signed a five-year contract worth $37.5 million, with $15.95 million guaranteed.

At the end of the 2012 season, Davis and the 49ers appeared in Super Bowl XLVII. He started in the game, but the 49ers fell to the Baltimore Ravens by a score of 34–31.

On June 5, 2015, Davis announced he would not be playing during the 2015 season, stating he wanted time to "let his brain and body heal". He vowed a return after the break, however, claiming he wanted to return as the best right tackle in the league. On July 25, 2016, Davis filed reinstatement paperwork aiming to return to the team by the start of training camp. On July 30, Davis was officially reinstated by the league and re-joined the 49ers in time for their training camp. On September 26, 2016, Davis announced his decision to retire again from the league, and was subsequently placed on the reserve/left squad list.

On May 3, 2019, he applied for reinstatement from retirement. On May 28, 2019, he was released from the 49ers' reserve/left squad list.
