= Kyle Wilson (cornerback) =

American football player (born 1987)

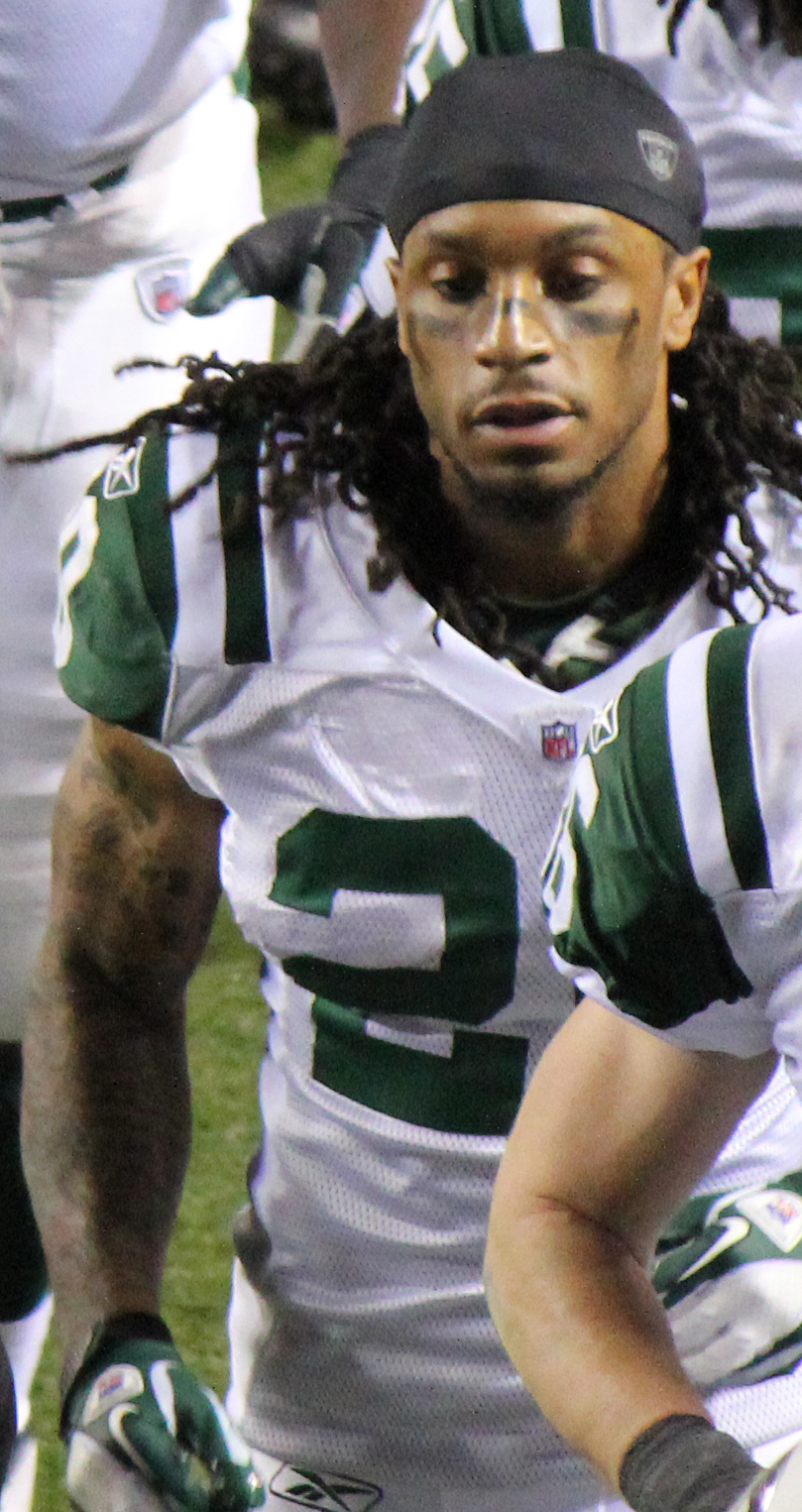
- Wilson with the New York Jets in 2011

No. 20, 24
- Position: Cornerback

Personal information
- Born: May 30, 1987 (age 39); Piscataway, New Jersey, U.S.
- Listed height: 5 ft 10 in (1.78 m)
- Listed weight: 190 lb (86 kg)

Career information
- High school: Piscataway
- College: Boise State (2005–2009)
- NFL draft: 2010: 1st round, 29th overall pick

Career history
- New York Jets (2010–2014); New Orleans Saints (2015–2016)

Awards and highlights
- Second-team All-American (2009); 2× First-team All-WAC (2008, 2009); Second-team All-WAC (2007)

Career NFL statistics
- Total tackles: 189
- Sacks: 1
- Forced fumbles: 1
- Fumble recoveries: 1
- Interceptions: 4
- Stats at Pro Football Reference

Kyle Wilson (born May 30, 1987) is an American former professional football player who was a cornerback in the National Football League (NFL). He played college football for Boise State. He was selected by the New York Jets in the first round of the 2010 NFL draft, remaining with the Jets for five seasons. He then played with the New Orleans Saints for two seasons beginning in 2015.

== Early life ==
A native of Piscataway, New Jersey, Wilson attended Piscataway High School, graduating in 2005. He helped the football team to three straight state championships, including undefeated seasons in 2002 and 2004, and a 33-3 overall record. He was named first-team all-state as wide receiver while also garnering all-area, all-county, all-conference and all-division honors. Wilson also lettered in track & field at Piscataway, running the 100-meter dash in 10.8 seconds and the 200-meter dash in 22.49 seconds.

Considered just a two-star recruit by Rivals.com, Wilson received only few scholarship offers. He picked Boise State over Rutgers and Delaware.

== College career ==
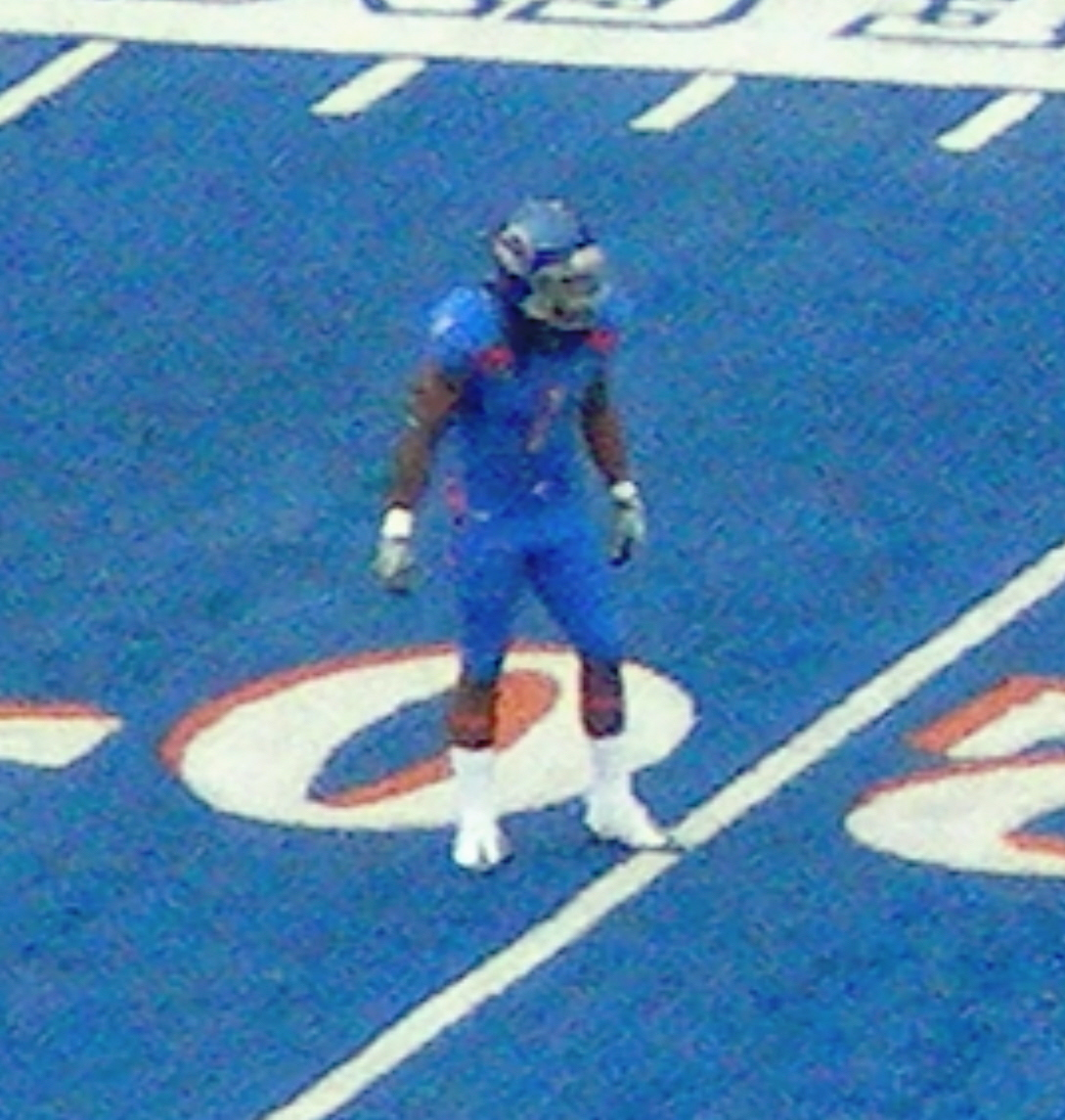
Wilson during his tenure at Boise State in 2009

After redshirting the 2005 season, Wilson played in 10 games and finished 10th on team with 41 tackles, 0.5 tackles for loss, five pass breakups, one forced fumble, one fumble recovery and an interception. He started final five games at cornerback and delivered an impressive performance at the 2007 Fiesta Bowl, finishing with 10 tackles in Boise State's 43–42 upset win over Oklahoma. Wilson was named honorable mention Freshman All-America by Sporting News.

As a sophomore, Wilson started all 13 games at cornerback, finishing the season with 41 tackles, eight pass breakups, two interceptions, two tackles for loss, one sack and a blocked kick. His season-high six tackles came against East Carolina in the 2007 Hawaii Bowl. Wilson earned second-team All-WAC honors.

In his junior season, Wilson led Boise State with five interceptions, 10 pass breakups and 15 passes defended. He recorded 35 tackles, 26 of which were unassisted, and returned 33 punts for 470 yards and three touchdowns. Wilson started each game of the season, making his current streak of 31 consecutive starts the longest active streak on team. He was named first-team All-WAC cornerback and second-team all-conference punt returner. Also, The Sporting News named him to their 2008 All-American Second-team.

In 2009, Rivals.com listed him at No. 3 of their preseason cornerback power ranking. In October, he was named a midseason All-American by The Sporting News, and in early November he was named one of twelve semifinalists for the 2009 Jim Thorpe Award.

== Professional career ==
=== Pre-draft ===
Wilson was considered one of the best cornerbacks available in the 2010 NFL draft, and drew comparisons to Dré Bly. According to Sports Illustrated′s Tony Pauline, Wilson was "graded as a fringe middle round pick by NFL scouting services" prior to his senior season, "but has since cemented himself as a top 100 choice." He was only the second defensive back from Boise State to be selected in the first three rounds of an NFL Draft, following Gerald Alexander in 2007.

Pre-draft measurables
| Height | Weight | Arm length | Hand span | 40-yard dash | 10-yard split | 20-yard split | 20-yard shuttle | Three-cone drill | Vertical jump | Broad jump | Bench press |
|---|---|---|---|---|---|---|---|---|---|---|---|
| 5 ft 10 in (1.78 m) | 194 lb (88 kg) | 30 1/2 in (0.77 m) | 9 1/8 in (0.23 m) | 4.43 s | 1.53 s | 2.59 s | 4.10 s | 6.84 s | 38.0 in (0.97 m) | 10 ft 2 in (3.10 m) | 25 reps |
All values from NFL Combine/Boise State's Pro Day

=== New York Jets ===
Wilson was taken in the first round with the 29th overall pick by the New York Jets. At the 2010 Jets minicamp, Wilson impressed the coaching staff, many of whom considered Wilson a "steal."

On July 31, 2010, Wilson signed a five-year, $13 million contract with the Jets. He served as the #3 CB behind Darrelle Revis and Antonio Cromartie going into training camp.

Wilson intercepted the first pass of his professional career on October 23, 2011 against Philip Rivers. It came at a critical point during the game as the Chargers attempted to regain the lead, ultimately losing to the Jets 27–21.

Going into the 2013 season following the draft of University of Alabama cornerback Dee Milliner, Wilson was again projected as starting as the nickel CB.

=== New Orleans Saints ===
On April 1, 2015, the New Orleans Saints signed Wilson to a one-year, $825,000 contract with a signing bonus of $80,000.

On March 7, 2016, the Saints signed Wilson to a one-year, $840,000 contract with an $80,000 signing bonus.

On June 24, 2016, the Saints placed Wilson on the Reserved/Injured list.

=== NFL statistics ===
| Year | Team | GP | COMB | TOTAL | AST | SACK | FF | FR | FR YDS | INT | IR YDS | AVG IR | LNG | TD | PD |
|---|---|---|---|---|---|---|---|---|---|---|---|---|---|---|---|
| 2010 | NYJ | 16 | 21 | 18 | 3 | 0.0 | 0 | 1 | 0 | 0 | 0 | 0 | 0 | 0 | 5 |
| 2011 | NYJ | 16 | 41 | 35 | 6 | 0.0 | 0 | 0 | 0 | 2 | 13 | 7 | 10 | 0 | 6 |
| 2012 | NYJ | 16 | 48 | 41 | 7 | 0.0 | 1 | 1 | 0 | 1 | 5 | 5 | 5 | 0 | 4 |
| 2013 | NYJ | 16 | 26 | 24 | 2 | 0.0 | 0 | 0 | 0 | 0 | 0 | 0 | 0 | 0 | 1 |
| 2014 | NYJ | 16 | 26 | 24 | 2 | 1.0 | 0 | 0 | 0 | 0 | 0 | 0 | 0 | 0 | 1 |
| 2015 | NO | 15 | 27 | 25 | 2 | 0.0 | 0 | 1 | 4 | 1 | 20 | 20 | 20 | 0 | 4 |
| Career | | 95 | 189 | 167 | 22 | 1.0 | 1 | 3 | 4 | 4 | 38 | 9 | 20 | 0 | 21 |

== Personal life ==
Wilson graduated from Boise State with a degree in communication.
