= Ralph Bowen =

Canadian jazz saxophonist (born 1961)

- Born: December 24, 1961 (age 64); Guelph, Ontario, Canada
- Genre: Jazz
- Occupation: Musician
- Instrument: Tenor saxophone
- Labels: Criss Cross, Posi-Tone
- Website: ralphbowen.com

Ralph Bowen (born December 24, 1961) is a Canadian jazz saxophonist.

== Biography ==
Bowen started piano lessons at an early age, with clarinet and saxophone lessons following soon after. At thirteen he led a quartet and performed in big bands in Toronto. As a teenager, he was awarded a grant from the Canada Council for the Arts to study music with Pat LaBarbera and Phil Nimmons at the Banff School of Fine Arts. While in Toronto, he studied with LaBarbera for eight years and developed a long-time association with drummer Keith Blackley and his father, drummer Jim Blackley. He performed and recorded with Canadian fusion group Manteca.

In 1983 and 1984, he was awarded two more grants to pursue his musical studies in at the jazz department at Indiana University, where his teacher was David Baker. In 1985, the same year he and Cecil Taylor were voted Main Jazz Men of the Year by the Toronto Globe and Mail, Bowen won the audition for the Blue Note Records co-leader position of the contemporary all-star New York based jazz band known as Out of the Blue (OTB). He moved to New York and would eventually record four albums for Blue Note.

In 1986, Bowen began to tour with jazz pianist Michel Camilo with whom he recorded a number of albums and soundtracks. Between 1986 and 1991 he completed three world tours with jazz pianist Horace Silver and toured Europe with Jim Beard. He has also worked with Orrin Evans, Jim Trompeter, Renee Rosnes, Earl MacDonald, Ralph Peterson Jr., Charles Fambrough, and Anthony Branker.

Bowen has led the jazz program at Mason Gross School of the Arts at Rutgers University.

== Awards and honors ==
- Silver Disk Award for Best Jazz Album, Japan, OTB by Out of the Blue, 1986
- Canadian Juno Award, Best Mainstream Album, Free Trade wit Peter Leitch, Renee Rosnes, Neil Swainson, Terry Clarke, 1994

== Discography ==
=== As leader/co-leader ===
- 1991: Movin' On (Criss Cross Jazz, 1992)
- 2001: A Morning View (Ratamacue, 2001)
- 2001: Soul Proprietor (Criss Cross Jazz, 2002)
- 2003: Keep the Change (Criss Cross Jazz, 2004)
- 2007: Five (Criss Cross Jazz, 2008)
- 2008: Dedicated (Posi-Tone, 2009)
- 2008: Due Reverence (Posi-Tone, 2010)
- 2009: Power Play (Posi-Tone, 2011)
- 2011: Total Eclipse (Posi-Tone, 2012)
- 2013: Standard Deviation (Posi-Tone, 2014)
- 2016: Ralph Bowen (Posi-Tone, 2017)

Collaboration
With Peter Leitch, Renee Rosnes, Neil Swainson and Terry Clarke

- Free Trade (Justin Time, 1994)

=== As a member ===
Manteca

- Strength in Numbers (Ready·RCA, 1984)

Out of the Blue

- O.T.B. (Blue Note, 1985)
- Inside Track (Blue Note, 1986)
- Live at Mt. Fuji (Blue Note, 1987) – live, recorded at the Mount Fuji Jazz Festival in 1986
- Spiral Staircase (Blue Note, 1989)

=== As sideman ===
With Anthony Branker

- Spirit Songs (Sons of Sound, 2006)
- Blessings (Origin, 2009)
- Dance Music (Origin, 2010)
- Dialogic (Origin, 2011)
- Together (Origin, 2012)
- Uppity (Origin, 2013)
- The Forward (Towards Equality) Suite (Origin, 2014)
- Beauty Within (Origin, 2016)

With Michel Camilo

- On the Other Hand (Epic, 1990)
- Amo Tu Cama Rica (Epic, 1991)
- One More Once (Columbia, 1994)
- Caribe (Calle, 2009)
- Essence (Sony, 2019)

With Orrin Evans

- Captain Black (Criss Cross Jazz, 1998) – rec. 1997–1998
- Listen to the Band (Criss Cross Jazz, 2000) – rec. 1999
- Meant to Shine (Palmetto, 2002)
- Easy Now (Criss Cross Jazz, 2005) – rec. 2004

With others

- Benny Carter, Harlem Renaissance (MusicMasters, 1992) – live
- Michael Dease, Reaching Out (Posi-Tone, 2018)
- Charles Fambrough, Keeper of the Spirit (AudioQuest, 1995)
- Conrad Herwig, A Voice Through the Door (Criss Cross Jazz, 2012)
- Brian Lynch, Conclave (Criss Cross Jazz, 2005)
- Earl MacDonald, Schroeder's Tantrum (Radioland Jazz, 1997)
- Ralph Peterson Jr., Back to Stay (Sirocco Jazz, 1999)
- Renee Rosnes, Renee Rosnes (Blue Note, 1990)
- Jim Rotondi, The Move (Criss Cross Jazz, 2010)
- John Serry Jr., Enchantress (Telarc, 1996)
- Horace Silver, Rockin' with Rachmaninoff (Bop City, 2003)

== Other sources ==
- Richard Skelly, Ralph Bowen, at AllMusic
