= Piscataway Township Schools =

School district in Middlesex County, New Jersey, US

Address
- 1515 Stelton Road Piscataway, Middlesex County, New Jersey, 08854; United States
- Coordinates: 40.539249°N 74.471474°W

District information
- Grades: PreK to 12
- Superintendent: Erskine R. Glover
- Business administrator: David Oliveira
- Schools: 11

Students and staff
- Enrollment: 7,331 (as of 2024–25)
- Faculty: 552.0 FTEs
- Student–teacher ratio: 13.3:1

Other information
- District Factor Group: GH
- Website: www.piscatawayschools.org
Ind.	Per pupil	District spending	Rank (*)	K-12 average	%± vs. average
1A	Total Spending	$15,594	9	$18,891	−17.5%
1	Budgetary Cost	12,653	16	14,783	−14.4%
2	Classroom Instruction	8,016	23	8,763	−8.5%
6	Support Services	1,811	21	2,392	−24.3%
8	Administrative Cost	1,162	10	1,485	−21.8%
10	Operations & Maintenance	1,437	27	1,783	−19.4%
13	Extracurricular Activities	202	33	268	−24.6%
16	Median Teacher Salary	75,337	90	64,043
Data from NJDoE 2014 Taxpayers' Guide to Education Spending. *Of K-12 districts with more than 3,500 students. Lowest spending=1; Highest=103

The Piscataway Township Schools is a community public school district that serves students in pre-kindergarten through twelfth grade from Piscataway, in Middlesex County, in the U.S. state of New Jersey. In addition to its high school, there are four schools for K-3, two intermediate schools serving grades 4–5 and three middle schools for students in grades 6–8.

As of the 2024–25 school year, the district, comprised of 11 schools, had an enrollment of 7,331 students and 552.0 classroom teachers (on an FTE basis), for a student–teacher ratio of 13.3:1.

The district had been classified by the New Jersey Department of Education as being in District Factor Group "GH", the third-highest of eight groupings. District Factor Groups organize districts statewide to allow comparison by common socioeconomic characteristics of the local districts. From lowest socioeconomic status to highest, the categories are A, B, CD, DE, FG, GH, I and J.

== Awards and recognition ==
For the 1999-2000 school year, Conackamack Middle School received the National Blue Ribbon Award of Excellence from the United States Department of Education, the highest honor that an American school can achieve.

The district was selected as one of the top "100 Best Communities for Music Education in America 2005" by the American Music Conference.

The NAMM Foundation named the district in its 2009 survey of the "Best Communities for Music Education", which included 124 school districts nationwide.

Piscataway High School was recognized by Governor Jim McGreevey in 2003 as one of 25 schools selected statewide for the First Annual Governor's School of Excellence award.

== Schools ==
Schools in the district (with 2024–24 enrollment data from the National Center for Education Statistics) are:

Preschool

- Children’s Corner Preschool (with 616 students in PreK)
  - Jennifer Sernotti, principal

Elementary schools

- Eisenhower Elementary School (513 students; in grades K–3)
  - Vincenzo Stio, principal
- Grandview Elementary School (579; K–3)
  - Anne Papenberg, principal
- Knollwood Elementary School (646; K–3)
  - Brian Voigt, principal
- Randolphville Elementary School (465; K–3)
  - Megan Messina, acting principal

Intermediate schools

- Arbor Intermediate School (528; 4–5)
  - Heather O'Donnell, principal
- Martin Luther King Intermediate School (488; 4–5)
  - Andrew Kehoe, principal

Middle schools

- Conackamack Middle School (466; 6-8)
  - Matthew Ritchie, principal
- Quibbletown Middle School (467; 6-8)
  - William Gonzalez, principal
- Theodore Schor Middle School (563; 6-8)
  - Lisa Parker, principal

High school

- Piscataway High School (2,144; 9-12)
  - Christopher Baldass, principal

== Administration ==
Core members of the district's administration are:

- Erskine R. Glover, superintendent of schools
- David Oliveira, business administrator and board secretary
- Dr. William Baskerville, assistant superintendent for curriculum & instruction

== Board of education ==
The district's board of education, comprised of nine members, sets policy and oversees the fiscal and educational operation of the district through its administration. As a Type II school district, the board's trustees are elected directly by voters to serve three-year terms of office on a staggered basis, with three seats up for election each year held (since 2012) as part of the November general election. The board appoints a superintendent to oversee the district's day-to-day operations and a business administrator to supervise the business functions of the district.

== See also ==
- New Jersey v. T. L. O.
- Piscataway School Board v. Taxman
