= Dwayne Gratz =

American football player (born 1990)

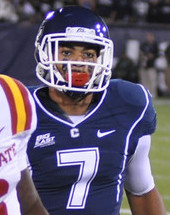
- Gratz with the UConn Huskies in 2011

No. 21, 27
- Position: Cornerback

Personal information
- Born: March 8, 1990 (age 36); Piscataway, New Jersey, U.S.
- Listed height: 5 ft 11 in (1.80 m)
- Listed weight: 201 lb (91 kg)

Career information
- High school: Piscataway Township
- College: Connecticut (2008–2012)
- NFL draft: 2013: 3rd round, 64th overall pick

Career history
- Jacksonville Jaguars (2013–2016); Los Angeles Rams (2016); Philadelphia Eagles (2016)

Awards and highlights
- 2× Second-team All-Big East (2011, 2012)

Career NFL statistics
- Total tackles: 119
- Forced fumbles: 2
- Pass deflections: 12
- Interceptions: 3
- Defensive touchdowns: 1
- Stats at Pro Football Reference

Dwayne Jamar Gratz (born March 8, 1990) is an American former professional football player who was a cornerback in the National Football League (NFL). He was selected by the Jacksonville Jaguars in the third round of the 2013 NFL draft. He played college football for the UConn Huskies.

== Early life ==
Gratz grew up in Piscataway, New Jersey and attended Piscataway Township High School, where he was a letterman in football and track. He played high school football for the Piscataway Chiefs team. He was named first-team all-area in 2007 and all-region. He helped Piscataway to the 2005 and 2007 state championship games. He recorded 65 tackles as a senior with 16 pass breakups and a pair of interceptions.

In track & field, Gratz competed in events ranging from the 55-meters to the triple jump. He was named an All-county pick after running a 7.5-second 55-meter hurdles, setting a school record. In sprints, he got a PR time of 6.65 seconds in the 55-meter dash at the 2008 GMC Championships, where he took third. In the jumping events, he recorded personal-best leaps of 6.08 meters (19 ft 9 in) in the long jump and 12.18 meters (39 ft 7in) in the triple jump.

Considered a three-star recruit by Rivals.com, Gratz was rated as the 28th best cornerback in the nation. He accepted a scholarship from the University of Connecticut over offers from Cincinnati, Michigan State and Temple.

== College career ==
Gratz enrolled in the University of Connecticut, where he played for the Connecticut Huskies football team from 2008 to 2012. After redshirting during the 2008 season, he saw his first collegiate action in 2009. He played in all 13 games and started four of the final five games of the regular season, and recorded 20 tackles and four pass deflections. In 2010, he started all 13 games at cornerback. He had a 46-yard interception return for a touchdown in the second quarter of the 2011 Tostitos Fiesta Bowl. He was the third-leading tackler on the team with 63 stops, and also led the team with nine pass breakups. In 2011, he was named to the all-conference second-team. He was the fifth-leading tackler on the team with 53 tackles and was tied for the team lead with three interceptions, had 4.5 tackles for loss for 12 yards on the year and also had four pass breakups. In his final collegiate season, he made 53 total tackles, 3.5 TFLs and led the team with three interceptions to go with 11 pass breakups, and was named to the all-conference second-team for the second consecutive season.

== Professional career ==
Pre-draft measurables
Height	Weight	Arm length	Hand span	40-yard dash	10-yard split	20-yard split	20-yard shuttle	Three-cone drill	Vertical jump	Broad jump	Bench press
5 ft 11 1/8 in (1.81 m)	201 lb (91 kg)	32 1/8 in (0.82 m)	10 1/2 in (0.27 m)	4.47 s	1.60 s	2.62 s	4.15 s	6.70 s	38.0 in (0.97 m)	10 ft 5 in (3.18 m)	22 reps
All values from NFL Combine

=== Jacksonville Jaguars ===
Gratz was selected in the third round, with the 64th overall pick, by the Jacksonville Jaguars in the 2013 NFL draft. He registered his first career interception on November 10, 2013 against Tennessee Titans quarterback Jake Locker.

On October 10, 2016, Gratz was released by the Jaguars.

=== Los Angeles Rams ===
On October 11, 2016, Gratz was claimed off waivers by the Los Angeles Rams. He was released by the Rams on November 22, 2016.

=== Philadelphia Eagles ===
On December 12, 2016, Gratz signed a two-year deal with the Eagles. He was released on July 23, 2017.
