= Greater Middlesex Conference =

The Greater Middlesex Conference is an athletic conference comprising 34 public and private high schools located in the greater Middlesex County, New Jersey area. The league operates under the supervision of the New Jersey State Interscholastic Athletic Association. There are both competitions in Middle and High school levels.

== Gold Division ==
School	Location	School District	Team Name
Timothy Christian School (New Jersey)	Piscataway	Piscataway Township Schools	Tigers
Dunellen High School	Dunellen	Dunellen Public Schools	Destroyers
Middlesex Academy Edison	Edison	Middlesex County Vocational and Technical High Schools	Eagles
Middlesex Academy Woodbridge	Woodbridge Township	Middlesex County Vocational and Technical High Schools	Hornets
Middlesex Tech East Brunswick	East Brunswick	Middlesex County Vocational and Technical High Schools	Tigers
Middlesex Tech Perth Amboy	Perth Amboy	Middlesex County Vocational and Technical High Schools	Patriots
Middlesex Tech Piscataway	Piscataway	Middlesex County Vocational and Technical High Schools	Raiders
South Amboy High School	South Amboy	South Amboy Public Schools	Governors

== Blue Division ==
School	Location	School District	Team Name
Bishop George Ahr High School	Edison	Roman Catholic Diocese of Metuchen	Trojans
Highland Park High School	Highland Park	Highland Park Public Schools	Owls
Metuchen High School	Metuchen	Metuchen School District	Bulldogs
Middlesex High School	Middlesex	Middlesex Board of Education	Blue Jays
Mother Seton Regional High School	Clark	Roman Catholic Archdiocese of Newark	Setters
North Brunswick Township High School	North Brunswick	North Brunswick Township Public Schools	Raiders
South River High School	South River	South River Public Schools	Rams
Spotswood High School	Spotswood	Spotswood Public Schools	Chargers

== White Division ==
School	Location	School District	Team Name
Carteret High School	Carteret	Carteret School District	Ramblers
Colonia High School	Colonia	Woodbridge Township School District	Patriots
New Brunswick High School	New Brunswick	New Brunswick Public Schools	Zebras
Sayreville War Memorial High School	Sayreville	Sayreville Public Schools	Bombers
South Plainfield High School	South Plainfield	South Plainfield Public Schools	Tigers
John F. Kennedy Memorial High School	Woodbridge Township	Woodbridge Township School District	Mustangs

== Red Division ==
School	Location	School District	Team Name
East Brunswick High School	East Brunswick	East Brunswick Public Schools	Bears
Monroe Township High School	Monroe Township	Monroe Township School District	Falcons
Edison High School	Edison	Edison Township Public Schools	Eagles
J. P. Stevens High School	Edison	Edison Township Public Schools	Hawks
Old Bridge High School	Old Bridge	Old Bridge Township Public Schools	Knights
Perth Amboy High School	Perth Amboy	Perth Amboy Public Schools	Panthers
Academy for Urban Leadership Charter High School	Perth Amboy		Jaguars
Piscataway Township High School	Piscataway	Piscataway Township Schools	Chiefs
South Brunswick High School	South Brunswick	South Brunswick Public Schools	Vikings
St. Joseph High School	Metuchen	Roman Catholic Diocese of Metuchen	Falcons
Woodbridge High School	Woodbridge	Woodbridge Township School District	Barrons

East Brunswick High School serves Grades 10–12. Freshmen are housed at Churchill Junior High School, along with the 8th graders.

== League sports ==
The following is a list of the sports that the Greater Middlesex Conference offers. Some sports do not have a team from every school, while other sports have teams from all 33 member schools. Each bullet is an individual team (as in one team for girls and one team for boys — not a combined unisex team). For example, although the boys and girls track teams from a single school usually practice together and have meets at the same time, there are separate events at their meets for boys and for girls, and therefore, the teams are scored and compete separately.

=== Fall sports ===
- Cross Country
- Field Hockey
- Football
- Soccer
- Cheerleading
- Marching Band
- Tennis (Girls)
- Volleyball (G)

=== Winter sports ===
- Basketball
- Bowling
- Ice Hockey
- Swimming
- Winter Track (and field)
- Wrestling
- Sailing

=== Spring sports ===
- Baseball
- Golf
- Lacrosse
- Softball
- Tennis (Boys)
- Track & Field
- Volleyball (B)
