= Union Valley =

Union Valley may refer to the following places:

- Union Valley, New Jersey, an unincorporated community in Middlesex County
- Union Valley, Texas, a city in Hunt County
- Union Valley, Kaufman County, Texas, an unincorporated community
- Union Valley Elementary School, a public school in Erial, New Jersey
- Union Valley Reservoir, a reservoir in El Dorado County, California
