= South Plainfield High School =

High school in Middlesex County, New Jersey, US

Location
- 200 Lake Street; South Plainfield, Middlesex County, New Jersey 07080; United States; 40.589747°N 74.412708°W

Information
- Type: Public high school
- Motto: Academics, Athletics, Arts
- NCES School ID: 341536003632
- Principal: John Foscolo
- Faculty: 93.0 FTEs
- Enrollment: 1,044 (as of 2024–25)
- Student to teacher ratio: 11.2:1
- Colors: Green and white
- Athletics conference: Greater Middlesex Conference (general); Big Central Football Conference (football)
- Team name: Tigers
- Publication: Tiger's Tale (literary magazine)
- Newspaper: Tiger Times
- Yearbook: Regit
- Website: www.spboe.org/o/sphs

South Plainfield High School (or SPHS) is a four-year, co-ed comprehensive community public high school located in South Plainfield in Middlesex County, in the U.S. state of New Jersey, serving students in ninth through twelfth grades and operating as the sole secondary school in the South Plainfield Public Schools. The school offers numerous clubs, activities, and athletics.

As of the 2024–25 school year, the school had an enrollment of 1,044 students and 93.0 classroom teachers (on an FTE basis), for a student–teacher ratio of 11.2:1. There were 322 students (30.8% of enrollment) eligible for free lunch and 57 (5.5% of students) eligible for reduced-cost lunch.

== Awards, recognition and rankings ==
In 1996, the New Jersey Department of Education recognized the school with the "Best Practices Award" for its Respect All Races Everywhere (R.A.R.E.) Program in which administrators, staff, and students work together to make cultural and ethnic diversity an instructional theme.

The school was the 157th-ranked public high school in New Jersey out of 339 schools statewide in New Jersey Monthly magazine's September 2014 cover story on the state's "Top Public High Schools", using a new ranking methodology. The school had been ranked 227th in the state of 328 schools in 2012, after being ranked 148th in 2010 out of 322 schools listed. The magazine ranked the school 158th in 2008 out of 316 schools. The school was ranked 160th in the magazine's September 2006 issue, which surveyed 316 schools across the state. Schooldigger.com ranked the school 183rd out of 381 public high schools statewide in its 2011 rankings (an increase of 25 positions from the 2010 ranking) which were based on the combined percentage of students classified as proficient or above proficient on the two components of the High School Proficiency Assessment (HSPA), mathematics (78.9%) and language arts literacy (93.5%). And in 2019, U.S. News ranked the school #96 in New Jersey high schools.

== Extracurricular activities ==
=== Music ===
Three music teachers are currently employed at South Plainfield High School: William Haughwout (director of bands), Donna Kregler (director of choirs), and Sarah LiVecchi (director of orchestras). As of 2018, William Haughwout is the permanent band director, succeeding Ryan Dore.

==== Ensembles ====
- Marching Band
- Concert Band
- Wind Ensemble (starting 2017-18 school year)
- Jazz Band
- Lab Jazz Band
- Orchestra
- Chamber Orchestra
- Concert Choir
- Chamber Choir
- Pit orchestra

=== Robotics ===
South Plainfield High School's FIRST Robotics Competition (FRC) team Tiger Tech 5624 has achieved several awards and has gained several victories since starting its rookie year in 2015. The team went on in 2016 to compete at the FIRST Championship in St. Louis, and earned a ranking of 31st out of 75 in the Archimedes Division.

=== Athletics ===
The South Plainfield High School Tigers compete in the Greater Middlesex Conference, which is comprised of public and private high schools located in the Middlesex County area, and operates under the supervision of the New Jersey State Interscholastic Athletic Association (NJSIAA). With 750 students in grades 10-12, the school was classified by the NJSIAA for the 2019–20 school year as Group II for most athletic competition purposes, which included schools with an enrollment of 486 to 758 students in that grade range. The football team competes in Division 3 of the Big Central Football Conference, which includes 60 public and private high schools in Hunterdon, Middlesex, Somerset, Union and Warren counties, which are broken down into 10 divisions by size and location. The school was classified by the NJSIAA as Group III North for football for 2024–2026, which included schools with 700 to 884 students.

==== Wrestling ====
The boys' wrestling team has won Group III state titles in 2001, 2005, 2006, 2010, 2012, 2013 and 2016-2019, and won Group II state titles in 2000 and 2007. The 12 group titles won by the program are the fifth-most of all teams in the state. In 2007, the wrestling team took Central Group II with a 48-16 win over Raritan. The team then moved on to win a Group II state title that year with a 58-6 semifinal win against Point Boro and a 42-9 in the finals against Hackettstown. The 2017 team finished the season with a record of 30-1 after defeating Delsea Regional High School 38-23 in the tournament final to win the Group II state title, the program's tenth championship.

In 2013, Anthony Ashnault became the first wrestler in state history to win four consecutive state championships while being undefeated in his high school wrestling career, finishing with an overall record of 170-0 during his four years at South Plainfield.

==== Baseball ====
In 2015, the baseball team won the NJSIAA Group III state baseball title, the program's first state championship, defeating Northern Burlington County Regional High School by a score of 8-4 in the tournament final.

==== Bowling ====
The girls' bowling team was the overall state champion in 1980 (tied with 2,424 pins as co-champion with Lenape High School) and 1991.

==== Field hockey ====
The team won the North II Group III state sectional title in 2004.

==== Softball ====
The softball team won the Central Jersey state championship in 1975, won the Group II title in 1989 (vs. Boonton High School in the tournament final) and 2000 (vs. Pompton Lakes High School), and won the Group III titles in both 2005 (vs. Northern Burlington County Regional High School) and 2017 (vs. Steinert High School).

The 1989 team defeated Boonton by a score of 5-3 in the playoff finals at Trenton State College to win the Group II title and finish the season with a record of 21-3.

The team won the 2000 Group II title with a 3-2 win in extra innings against Pompton Lakes in the tournament final.

The 2005 softball team captured a North II Group III title with a 2-0 victory over Voorhees High School in the sectional final. They then defeated North I, Group III sectional champion Sparta High School to advance to the Group III final, where they defeated Northern Burlington in the final to capture the Group III state championship. The team had won state titles in Group II in both 1989 and 2000.

The team won the Group III state championship in 2017, defeating Steinert High School by a score of 3-2 in the tournament final on a walk-off run scored on a ground out. The team advanced to the inaugural New Jersey State Interscholastic Athletic Association softball Tournament of Champions as the fourth seed, losing to fifth-seeded Non-Public B champion Immaculate Conception High School by a score of 4-3 in the first round.

==== Basketball ====
The boys' basketball team won the Group III state championship in 1964, defeating Summit High School in the tournament final.

In 2007, the girls' basketball team was the Group III runner-up, falling to Willingboro 53-46 in the tournament final.

==== Soccer ====
In 2014, the boys' soccer team captured a NJSIAA Group III state championship title, the program's first, with a 4-3 victory over Princeton High School in the tournament final.

== Administration ==
The school's principal is John Foscolo. His administration team includes three assistant principals.

== Student Demographics ==
2025-2026
| Race/Ethnicity | Percent of Students |
|---|---|
| White | 35.9% |
| Hispanic | 34.6% |
| Asian | 13.7% |
| Black | 12.8% |
| Two or More Races | 2.0% |
| Native Hawaiian/Pacific Islander | 0.6% |
| American Indian or Alaska Native | 0.0% |

== Notable alumni ==
- Anthony Ashnault (born 1995), freestyle wrestler
- Patrick J. Diegnan (born 1949), politician who has represented the 18th Legislative District in the New Jersey Senate since 2016
- Greg Garbowsky (born 1986, class of 2004), musician best known as the bass guitarist for the pop rock bands Ocean Grove and Jonas Brothers
- Rick Gomez, actor who played George Luz in HBO's Band of Brothers and as "Endless Mike" Hellstrom in The Adventures of Pete and Pete
- Dontae Johnson (born 1991), cornerback who has played in the National Football League for the San Francisco 49ers
- Daniel La Spata (born 1981, class of 1999) politician who has served as the alderman of Chicago's 1st ward since May 2019
- Dennis Madalone (born 1954), stunt-coordinator-turned-musician best known for his work on three of the Star Trek spin-offs — Star Trek: The Next Generation, Star Trek: Deep Space Nine and Star Trek: Voyager
- Michelle Visage (born 1968), judge on RuPaul's Drag Race, radio DJ, singer in the band Seduction, actress and media personality
