= Timothy Christian School =

Timothy Christian School may refer to:

- Timothy Christian School (Illinois), United States
- Timothy Christian School (New Jersey), United States
