= Spotswood High School (New Jersey) =

High school in Middlesex County, New Jersey, US

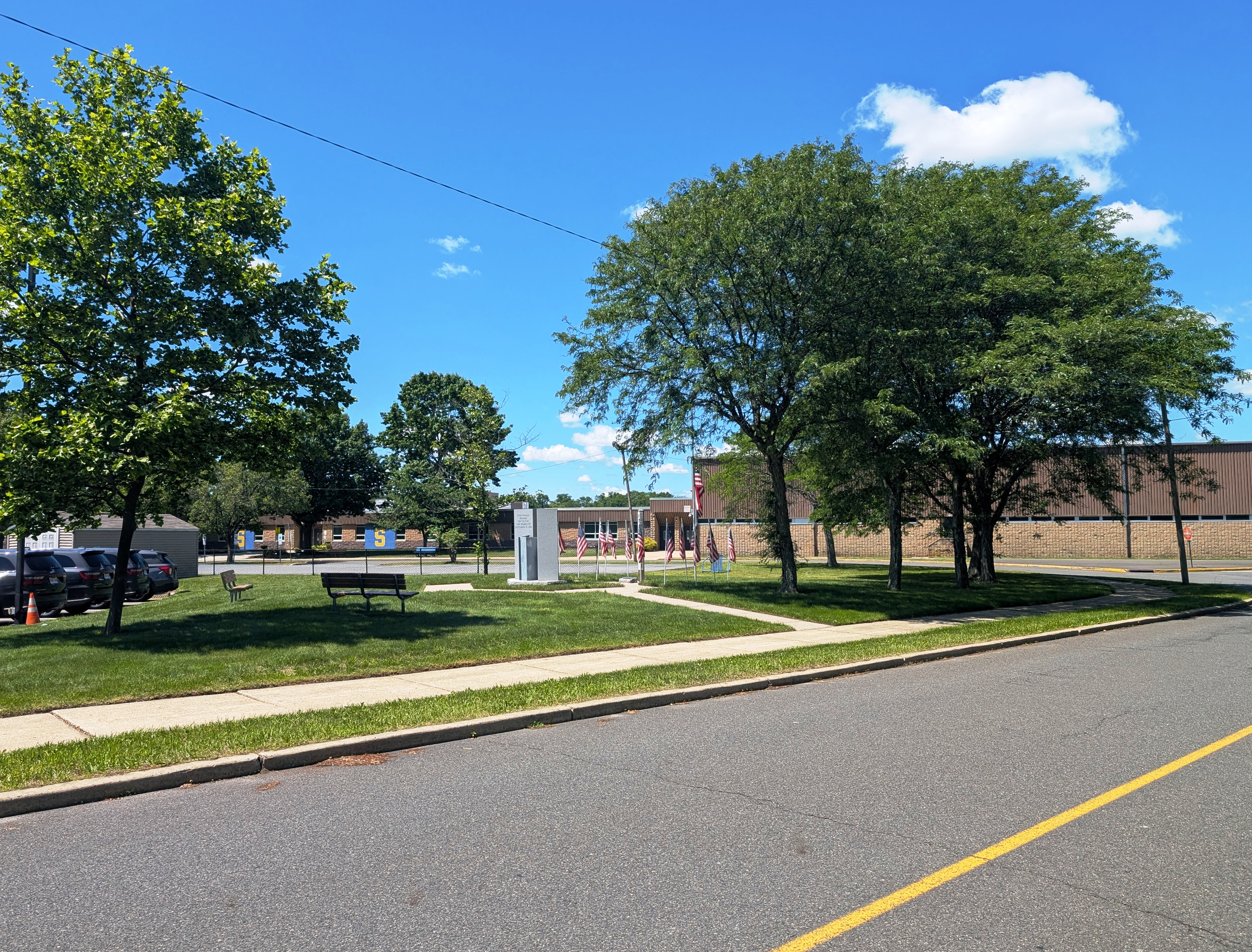
- High school main entrance and 9/11 memorial

Location
- 105 Summerhill Road; Spotswood, Middlesex County, New Jersey 08884; United States; 40.399138°N 74.386642°W

Information
- Type: Public high school
- School district: Spotswood Public Schools
- NCES School ID: 341554003660
- Principal: Amy Jablonski
- Faculty: 57.0 FTEs
- Grades: 9-12
- Enrollment: 773 (as of 2023–24)
- Student to teacher ratio: 13.6:1
- Colors: Royal blue gold
- Athletics conference: Greater Middlesex Conference (general); Big Central Football Conference (football)
- Team name: Chargers
- Rival: South River Rams
- Newspaper: The Scribbler
- Website: shs.spsd.us

Spotswood High School is a four-year comprehensive public high school, serving students in ninth through twelfth grade in Spotswood, in Middlesex County, in the U.S. state of New Jersey, operating as the lone secondary school of the Spotswood Public Schools. The school has been accredited by the Middle States Association of Colleges and Schools Commission on Elementary and Secondary Schools since 2023; the school's accreditation expires in January 2031.

As of the 2023–24 school year, the school had an enrollment of 773 students and 57.0 classroom teachers (on an FTE basis), for a student–teacher ratio of 13.6:1. There were 95 students (12.3% of enrollment) eligible for free lunch and 27 (3.5% of students) eligible for reduced-cost lunch.

Students from Helmetta, a non-operating district, attend school in Spotswood beginning in grammar school; students from Milltown attend the high school as part of a sending/receiving relationship with the Milltown Public Schools. As of 2021, Spotswood High School has had a postsecondary education rate of 33% for a four-year school, 33% for a two-year school, 7% for a business or technical school, and 27% into the workforce/other. Spotswood High School offers 14 Advanced Placement courses and 28 honors courses. Spotswood High School also offers the Seal of Biliteracy, certifying students in their proficiency in English and another language.

== Awards, recognition and rankings ==
During the 1992-93 school year, Spotswood High School was awarded the Blue Ribbon School Award of Excellence by the United States Department of Education, the highest award an American school can receive.

The school was the 159th-ranked public high school in New Jersey out of 339 schools statewide in New Jersey Monthly magazine's September 2014 cover story on the state's "Top Public High Schools", using a new ranking methodology. The school had been ranked 102nd in the state of 328 schools in 2012, after being ranked 105th in 2010 out of 322 schools listed. The magazine ranked the school 126th in 2008 out of 316 schools. The school was ranked 183rd in the magazine's September 2006 issue, which surveyed 316 schools across the state.

Schooldigger.com ranked the school 80th out of 381 public high schools statewide in its 2011 rankings (a decrease of 17 positions from the 2010 ranking) which were based on the combined percentage of students classified as proficient or above proficient on the mathematics (89.8%) and language arts literacy (95.8%) components of the High School Proficiency Assessment (HSPA).

== Athletics ==
The Spotswood High School Chargers compete in the Blue Division of the Greater Middlesex Conference, which is comprised of public and private high schools in the Middlesex County area and operates under the auspices of the New Jersey State Interscholastic Athletic Association. With 509 students in grades 10-12, the school was classified by the NJSIAA for the 2019–20 school year as Group II for most athletic competition purposes, which included schools with an enrollment of 486 to 758 students in that grade range. The football team competes in Division 2B of the Big Central Football Conference, which includes 60 public and private high schools in Hunterdon, Middlesex, Somerset, Union and Warren counties, which are broken down into 10 divisions by size and location. The school was classified by the NJSIAA as Group II South for football for 2024–2026, which included schools with 514 to 685 students.

The school participates together with South River High School in a joint ice hockey team in which East Brunswick High School is the host school / lead agency. The co-op program operates under agreements scheduled to expire at the end of the 2023–24 school year.

=== Cross country ===
- The men's cross country team had a 36 consecutive dual meet winning streak that started in 2000 and was snapped by Metuchen High School in September 2006.
- In the 2003 season, the men's team won the Central Jersey Group II sectional title.
- In 2005, the men's team won the Central Jersey Group II state sectional and Group II titles. The team advanced to the Meet of Champions, where the team finished in 11th place.

=== Track and field ===
- The 2004 men's spring track team broke Metuchen's 11-year win streak becoming 2004 Blue Division champions.
- The 2013 men's spring track team beat division rivals Kennedy and Metuchen to finish the season undefeated and become Blue Division Champions.

=== Baseball ===
- 2007 Central Jersey Group II sectional champions, with a 1-0 win over Somerville High School.
- 2007 GMC Tournament champions, the program's first title, with a 7-6 win against J. P. Stevens High School in the finals.
- 2007 NJSIAA Group II baseball state champions, defeating Sterling High School 13-2 in the semifinals and Indian Hills High School 11-1 in the group final.
- 2010 Central Jersey Group II sectional champions, with a 7-5 win over Governor Livingston High School

=== Basketball ===
- The women's basketball team won the NJSIAA Central Jersey Group I state sectional title in 1999 with a 56-50 win over Montgomery High School to earn the program's first title.

== Administration ==
The principal is Amy Jablonski. Her administration team includes the assistant principal.

== Notable alumni ==
- Michael "Jersey" Moriarty (class of 2004), bassist for the band Hey Monday
- Geno Zimmerlink (born 1963), former American football tight end who played for the Atlanta Falcons of the National Football League
