= Sayerwood South, New Jersey =

Populated place in Middlesex County, New Jersey, US

- Unincorporated community
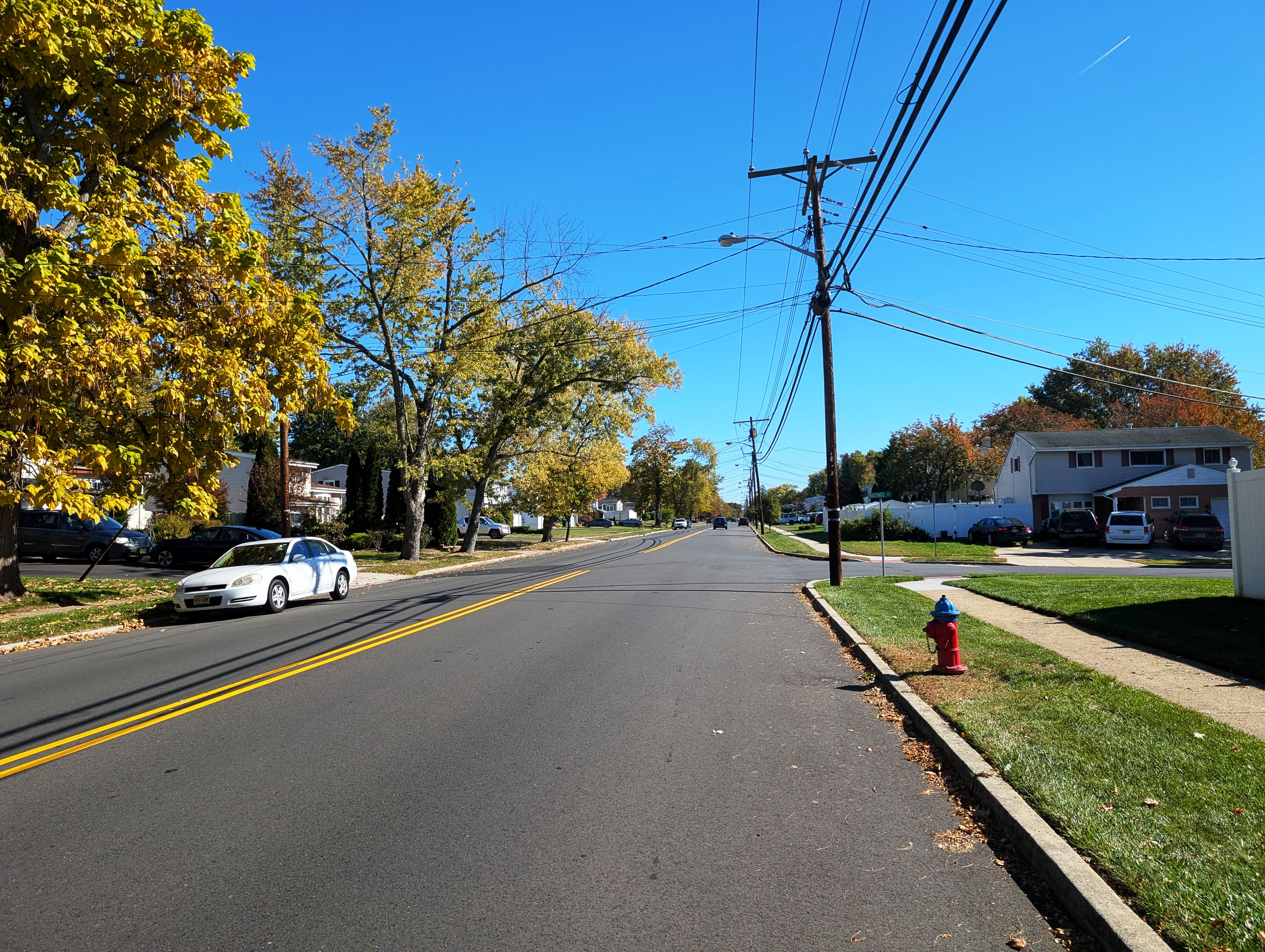
- Throckmorton Lane in the residential section of Sayerwood South

- Location of Sayerwood South in Middlesex County Inset: Location of county within the state of New Jersey Sayerwood South (New Jersey) Sayerwood South (the United States)
- Coordinates: 40°23′50″N 74°19′29″W
- Country: United States
- State: New Jersey
- County: Middlesex
- Township: Old Bridge
- Elevation: 82 ft (25 m)
- GNIS feature ID: 883194

Sayerwood South or Sayrewood South is an unincorporated community located within Old Bridge Township in Middlesex County, in the U.S. state of New Jersey.
