= Lahiere, New Jersey =

Populated place in Middlesex County, New Jersey, US

- Unincorporated community
- Location within Middlesex County, New Jersey Location within New Jersey Location within the United States
- Coordinates: 40°31′08″N 74°24′09″W
- Country: United States
- State: New Jersey
- County: Middlesex
- Township: Edison
- Elevation: 112 ft (34 m)
- GNIS feature ID: 884388

Lahiere is an unincorporated community located within Edison Township in Middlesex County, in the U.S. state of New Jersey.
