= East Spotswood, New Jersey =

Populated place in Middlesex County, New Jersey, US

- Unincorporated community
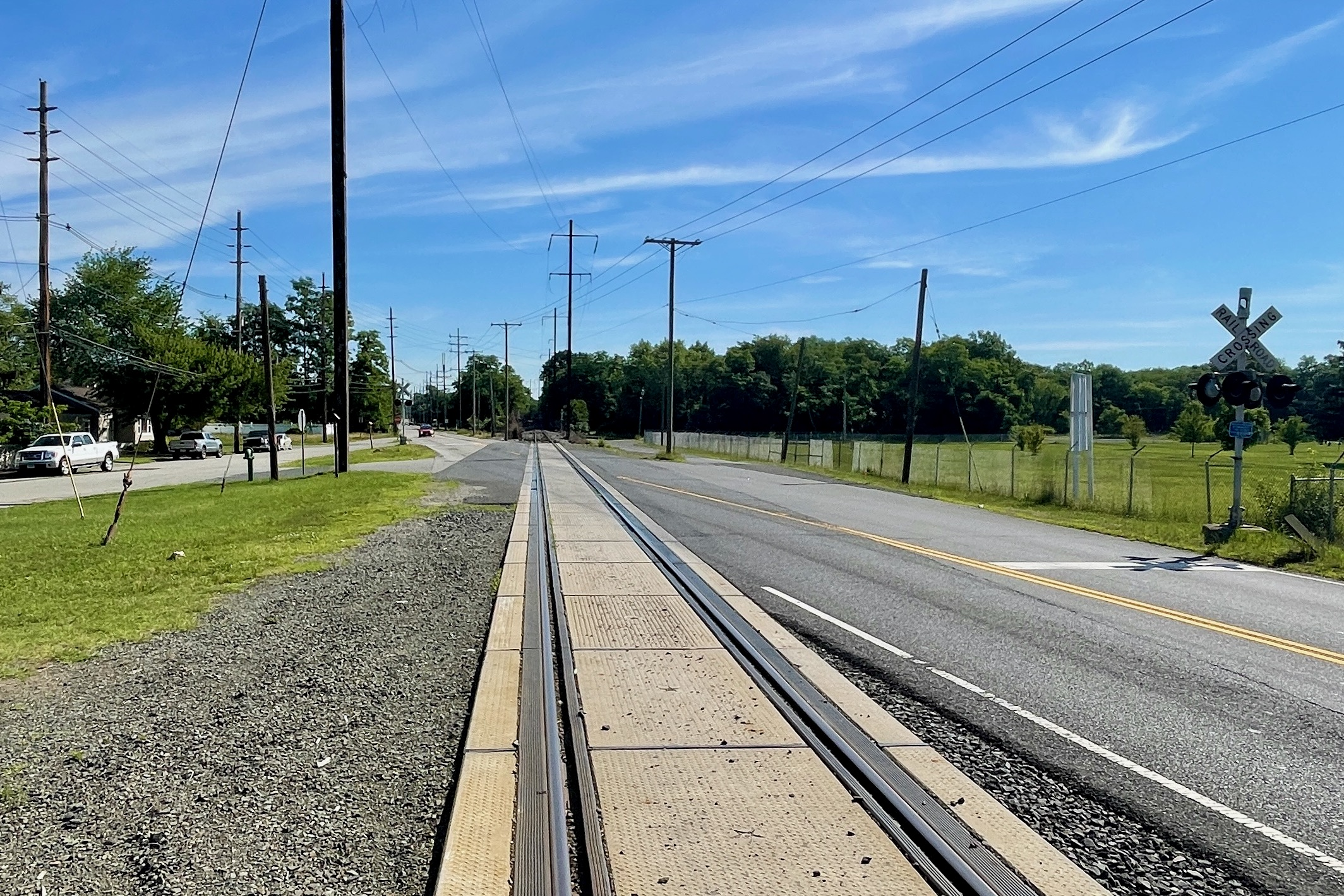
- Railroad crossing Main Street near East Spotswood Park

- Location within Middlesex County, New Jersey Location within New Jersey Location within the United States
- Coordinates: 40°24′16″N 74°22′38″W
- Country: United States
- State: New Jersey
- County: Middlesex
- Borough: Spotswood
- Elevation: 13 ft (4.0 m)
- GNIS feature ID: 876069

East Spotswood is an unincorporated community located within the borough of Spotswood in Middlesex County, New Jersey. Spotswood's East Spotswood Park and trackside memorial for the Camden and Amboy Railroad are located here. It had a passenger and freight station on the Pennsylvania Railroad, the United New Jersey Railroad and Canal Company subsidiary, which runs through the community.
