= Milltown Public Schools =

School district in Middlesex County, New Jersey, US

Address
- 21 West Church Street Milltown, Middlesex County, New Jersey, 08850; United States
- Coordinates: 40.449864°N 74.431666°W

District information
- Grades: Pre-K to 8
- Superintendent: Stephen T. Wisniewski
- Business administrator: Norma Tursi
- Schools: 2

Students and staff
- Enrollment: 815 (as of 2023–24)
- Faculty: 76.9 FTEs
- Student–teacher ratio: 10.6:1

Other information
- District Factor Group: FG
- Website: www.milltownps.org
Ind.	Per pupil	District spending	Rank (*)	K-8 average	%± vs. average
1A	Total Spending	$15,927	12	$18,891	−15.7%
1	Budgetary Cost	13,931	31	14,159	−1.6%
2	Classroom Instruction	8,495	30	8,659	−1.9%
6	Support Services	2,212	31	2,167	2.1%
8	Administrative Cost	1,324	6	1,547	−14.4%
10	Operations & Maintenance	1,644	37	1,612	2.0%
13	Extracurricular Activities	216	54	104	107.7%
16	Median Teacher Salary	46,699	1	61,136
Data from NJDoE 2014 Taxpayers' Guide to Education Spending. *Of K-8 districts with 401-750 students. Lowest spending=1; Highest=64

The Milltown Public Schools are a comprehensive community public school district, serving students in pre-kindergarten through eighth grade from Milltown, in Middlesex County, in the U.S. state of New Jersey.

As of the 2023–24 school year, the district, comprised of two schools, had an enrollment of 815 students and 76.9 classroom teachers (on an FTE basis), for a student–teacher ratio of 10.6:1.

For ninth through twelfth grades, public school students attend Spotswood High School in Spotswood as part of a sending/receiving relationship with the Spotswood Public Schools, which also serves students from Helmetta. As of the 2023–24 school year, the high school had an enrollment of 773 students and 57.0 classroom teachers (on an FTE basis), for a student–teacher ratio of 13.6:1.

== History ==
In 2013, Milltown and Spotswood had discussions of expanding the partnership between the two districts beyond the sending relationship.

The district had been classified by the New Jersey Department of Education as being in District Factor Group "FG", the fourth-highest of eight groupings. District Factor Groups organize districts statewide to allow comparison by common socioeconomic characteristics of the local districts. From lowest socioeconomic status to highest, the categories are A, B, CD, DE, FG, GH, I and J.

== Schools ==
Schools in the district (with 2023–24 enrollment data from the National Center for Education Statistics) are:

Elementary school

- Parkview School with 370 students in grades PreK–3
  - Eric Siegel, principal

Middle school

- Joyce Kilmer School with 436 students in grades 4–8
  - William Veit, principal

== Administration ==
Core members of the district's administration are:

- Stephen T. Wisniewski, superintendent
- Norma Tursi, business administrator and board secretary

== Board of education ==
The district's board of education, composed of nine members, sets policy and oversees the fiscal and educational operation of the district through its administration. As a Type II school district, the board's trustees are elected directly by voters to serve three-year terms of office on a staggered basis, with three seats up for election each year held (since 2012) as part of the November general election. The board appoints a superintendent to oversee the district's day-to-day operations and a business administrator to supervise the business functions of the district.
