= Timothy Christian School (New Jersey) =

Christian school in Middlesex County, New Jersey, United States

Location
- 2008 Ethel Road; Piscataway, Middlesex County, New Jersey 08854; United States
- 40.534595°N 74.415078°W

Information
- Type: Private school
- Motto: God Bless and Go Tigers!
- Established: 1949
- NCES School ID: 00869648
- Principal: James Smock
- Faculty: 43.5 FTEs
- Grades: PreK-12
- Enrollment: 452 (as of 2023–24)
- Student to teacher ratio: 10.4:1
- Colors: Blue and Gold
- Team name: Tigers
- Accreditation: Middle States Association of Colleges and Schools
- Tuition: $12,800 (grades 9-12 for 2022-23)
- Website: timothychristian.org

Timothy Christian is a private Christian school for students in pre-kindergarten through twelfth grade, located in Piscataway in Middlesex County, in the U.S. state of New Jersey.

The campus of Timothy Christian School, founded in 1949, consists of nine buildings, which used to be called Camp Kilmer. The school is an "interdenominational evangelical independent school that is fully accredited by ACSI and Middle States." The school has been accredited by the Middle States Association of Colleges and Schools Commission on Elementary and Secondary Schools since 2003 and its current accreditation expires in July 2030.

As of the 2023–24 school year, the school had an enrollment of 452 students and 43.5 classroom teachers (on an FTE basis), for a student–teacher ratio of 10.4:1. The school's student body was 31.0% (140) Black, 29.2% (132) White, 26.5% (120) Hispanic, 7.7% (35) Asian and 4.4% (20) two or more races, 0.7% (3) American Indian / Alaska Native and 0.4% (2) Native Hawaiian / Pacific Islander.

== Athletics ==
The Timothy Christian School Tigers compete in the Greater Middlesex Conference, which comprises public and private high schools in the county and operates under the supervision of the New Jersey State Interscholastic Athletic Association (NJSIAA). School colors are blue and gold.
