= Academy for Urban Leadership Charter High School =

Place in Mercer County, New Jersey, US

Academy for Urban Leadership Charter School

Location
- 612 Amboy Avenue; Perth Amboy, Middlesex County, New Jersey 08861; United States
- 40.521072°N 74.276457°W

Information
- Type: Charter public school
- Motto: To employ an educational design and experience that merges the highest standards of academic excellence while fostering convictions and commitment to social and economic justice.
- Established: 2010
- NCES School ID: 340074103050
- Principal: Margaret Rose Morales
- Faculty: 22.0 FTEs
- Grades: 7–12
- Enrollment: 259 (as of 2024–25)
- Student to teacher ratio: 11.8:1
- Colors: Navy Blue and Gold
- Team name: Jaguars
- Website: www.aulcs.org

Academy for Urban Leadership Charter School was a five-year comprehensive public charter school that serves students in seventh through twelfth grades from Perth Amboy, in Middlesex County, in the U.S. state of New Jersey. The school operates under the terms of a charter granted by the New Jersey Department of Education. After opening with 100 students in ninth grade in the 2010–11 school year, the school's plans were to add 100 students each year in ninth grade.

As of the 2024–25 school year, the school had an enrollment of 259 students and 22.0 classroom teachers (on an FTE basis), for a student–teacher ratio of 11.8:1. There were 201 students (77.6% of enrollment) eligible for free lunch and 30 (11.6% of students) eligible for reduced-cost lunch.

AUL's first graduating class of 2014 had a graduation rate of 95% and the second graduating class had a 100% graduation rate. The school started a sports program, with wrestling the only sport that had a varsity and a junior varsity team. The school also offered softball, baseball and basketball. For other sports that were not offered at the school, students could go participate and play for Perth Amboy High School's team.

The school started offering the SAT in its location. It was a college prep school that helped more students graduate and move on to college.

The school closed on June 30, 2025, after its charter agreement was revoked by the state of New Jersey.

== Athletics ==
The Academy for Urban Leadership Charter School Jaguars competed independently in interscholastic sports under the supervision of the New Jersey State Interscholastic Athletic Association. With 317 students in grades 10-12, the school was classified by the NJSIAA for the 2019–20 school year as Group I for most athletic competition purposes, which included schools with an enrollment of 75 to 476 students in that grade range.

== Administration ==
The school's Lead Administrator was Margaret Rose Morales. Her administration team included two vice principals.
