= Wyckoffs Mills, New Jersey =

Populated place in Middlesex County, New Jersey, US

- Unincorporated community
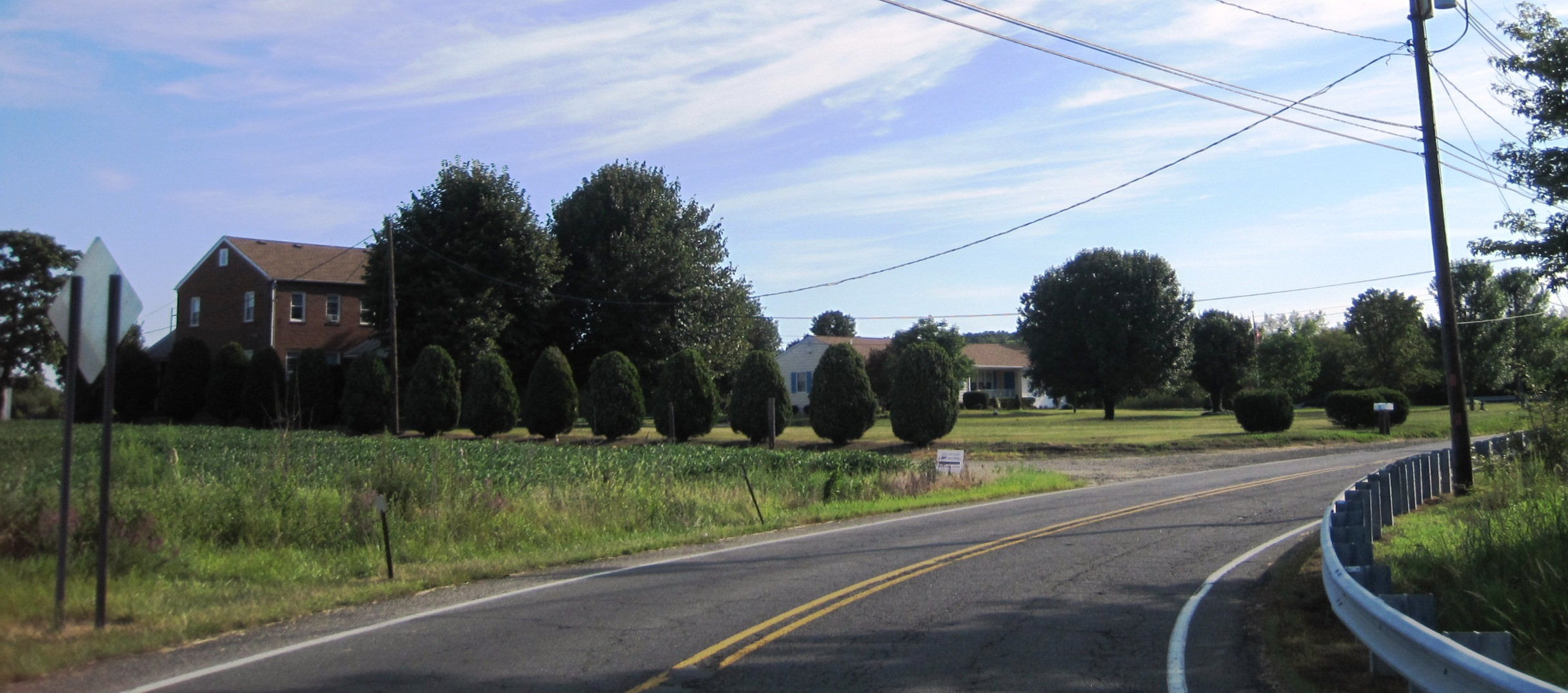
- Rounding a curve on Wyckoffs Mills Road

- Location of Wyckoffs Mills in Middlesex County Inset: Location of county within the state of New Jersey Wyckoffs Mills (New Jersey) Wyckoffs Mills (the United States)
- Coordinates: 40°16′47″N 74°29′09″W
- Country: United States
- State: New Jersey
- County: Middlesex
- Township: Cranbury and Monroe
- Elevation: 105 ft (32 m)
- GNIS feature ID: 881970

Wyckoffs Mills is an unincorporated community located along the border of Cranbury and Monroe townships in Middlesex County, in the U.S. state of New Jersey. Located at the intersection of Wyckoff Mills Road and Wyckoffs Mills Road, the area only contains lots containing residential structures; the remainder of the land is made up of farmland and wetlands. The Millstone River flows to the south of the settlement and a 500-kilovolt transmission line crosses the farmland to the north and south.
