= Shore Road Estates, New Jersey =

Populated place in Middlesex County, New Jersey, US

- Unincorporated community
- Location of Shore Road Estates in Middlesex County Inset: Location of county within the state of New Jersey Shore Road Estates (New Jersey) Shore Road Estates (the United States)
- Coordinates: 40°21′40″N 74°23′34″W
- Country: United States
- State: New Jersey
- County: Middlesex
- Township: Monroe
- Elevation: 118 ft (36 m)
- GNIS feature ID: 883007

Shore Road Estates is an unincorporated community located within Monroe Township in Middlesex County, in the U.S. state of New Jersey.
