= Metuchen School District =

School district in New Jersey

Address
- 16 Simpson Place Metuchen, Middlesex County, New Jersey, 08840; United States
- Coordinates: 40.53759°N 74.355209°W

District information
- Grades: PreK-12
- Superintendent: Vincent Caputo
- Business administrator: Michael A. Harvier
- Schools: 4

Students and staff
- Enrollment: 2,300 (as of 2019–20)
- Faculty: 182.2 FTEs
- Student–teacher ratio: 12.6:1

Other information
- District Factor Group: I
- Website: www.metuchenschools.org
Ind.	Per pupil	District spending	Rank (*)	K-12 average	%± vs. average
1A	Total Spending	$18,545	43	$18,891	−1.8%
1	Budgetary Cost	13,366	25	14,783	−9.6%
2	Classroom Instruction	8,250	37	8,763	−5.9%
6	Support Services	2,040	32	2,392	−14.7%
8	Administrative Cost	1,293	11	1,485	−12.9%
10	Operations & Maintenance	1,362	13	1,783	−23.6%
13	Extracurricular Activities	383	34	268	42.9%
16	Median Teacher Salary	64,091	37	64,043
Data from NJDoE 2014 Taxpayers' Guide to Education Spending. *Of K-12 districts with 1,800-3,500 students. Lowest spending=1; Highest=68

The Metuchen School District is a comprehensive community public school district that serves students in pre-kindergarten through twelfth grade from Metuchen, in Middlesex County, in the U.S. state of New Jersey.

As of the 2019–20 school year, the district, comprising four schools, had an enrollment of 2,300 students and 182.2 classroom teachers (on an FTE basis), for a student–teacher ratio of 12.6:1.

The district is classified by the New Jersey Department of Education as being in District Factor Group "I", the second-highest of eight groupings. District Factor Groups organize districts statewide to allow comparison by common socioeconomic characteristics of the local districts. From lowest socioeconomic status to highest, the categories are A, B, CD, DE, FG, GH, I and J.

== Awards and recognition ==
In 2022, the United States Department of Education announced that Edgar Middle School was named as a National Blue Ribbon School, along with eight other schools in the state and 297 schools nationwide.

The NAMM Foundation named the district in its 2008 survey of the "Best Communities for Music Education", which included 110 school districts nationwide. The district was also included in NAMM's 2009 survey of the "Best Communities for Music Education", which included 124 school districts nationwide.

== Schools ==
Schools in the district (with 2019–20 enrollment data from the National Center for Education Statistics) are:

Kindergarten

- Mildred B. Moss Elementary School with 122 students in Pre-kindergarten and kindergarten
  - Richard Cohen, principal

Elementary school

- Campbell Elementary School with 702 students in grades 1-4
  - Vincent Constanza, principal

Middle school

- Edgar Middle School with 722 students in grades 5-8
  - Suzy Azevedo, principal

High school

- Metuchen High School with 729 students in grades 9-12
  - Edward Porowski, principal

== Administration ==
Core members of the district's administration are:

- Vincent Caputo, superintendent
- Michael A. Harvier, business administrator and board secretary

== Board of education ==
The district's board of education is composed of nine members who set policy and oversee the fiscal and educational operation of the district through its administration. As a Type II school district, the board's trustees are elected directly by voters to serve three-year terms of office on a staggered basis, with three seats up for election each year held (since 2014) as part of the November general election. The board appoints a superintendent to oversee the district's day-to-day operations and a business administrator to supervise the business functions of the district.
