= South Plainfield Public Schools =

School district in Middlesex County, New Jersey, US

Address
- 125 Jackson Avenue South Plainfield, Middlesex County, New Jersey, 07080; United States
- Coordinates: 40.572002°N 74.417098°W

District information
- Grades: PreK to 12
- Superintendent: Noreen Tansey Lishak
- Business administrator: Alex Benanti
- Schools: 7

Students and staff
- Enrollment: 3,400 (as of 2020–21)
- Faculty: 304.0 FTEs
- Student–teacher ratio: 11.2:1

Other information
- District Factor Group: FG
- Website: spboe.org
Ind.	Per pupil	District spending	Rank (*)	K-12 average	%± vs. average
1A	Total Spending	$16,894	22	$18,891	−10.6%
1	Budgetary Cost	13,043	20	14,783	−11.8%
2	Classroom Instruction	7,835	24	8,763	−10.6%
6	Support Services	1,985	27	2,392	−17.0%
8	Administrative Cost	1,530	36	1,485	3.0%
10	Operations & Maintenance	1,218	4	1,783	−31.7%
13	Extracurricular Activities	378	31	268	41.0%
16	Median Teacher Salary	63,547	36	64,043
Data from NJDoE 2014 Taxpayers' Guide to Education Spending. *Of K-12 districts with 1,800-3,500 students. Lowest spending=1; Highest=68

The South Plainfield Public Schools is a comprehensive community public school district, for South Plainfield, in Middlesex County, in the U.S. state of New Jersey, that serves students in pre-kindergarten through twelfth grade.

As of the 2020–21 school year, the district, comprising seven schools, had an enrollment of 3,400 students and 304.0 classroom teachers (on an FTE basis), for a student–teacher ratio of 11.2:1.

The district is classified by the New Jersey Department of Education as being in District Factor Group "FG", the fourth-highest of eight groupings. District Factor Groups organize districts statewide to allow comparison by common socioeconomic characteristics of the local districts. From lowest socioeconomic status to highest, the categories are A, B, CD, DE, FG, GH, I and J.

== Schools ==
The schools in the district (with 2020–21 enrollment data from the National Center for Education Statistics). are:

Pre-school

- John E. Riley Preschool Annex

Elementary schools

- Franklin Elementary School with 264 students in grades K-4
  - Shannon A. Colucci, principal
- John F. Kennedy Elementary School with 268 students in grades K-4
  - Kevin Hajduk, principal
- John E. Riley Elementary School with 333 students in grades K-4
  - Timothy Coughlin, principal
- Roosevelt Elementary School with 448 students in grades K-4
  - Dana Karas, principal
- Grant School with 444 students in grades 5-6
  - Kevin McCann, principal

Middle school

- South Plainfield Middle School with 529 students in grades 7-8
  - Shanti Murray, principal

High school

- South Plainfield High School with 1,076 students in grades 9-12
  - John Foscolo, principal

== Administration ==
Core members of the district's administration are:

- Noreen Tansey Lishak, superintendent of schools
- Alex Benanti, board secretary and business administrator

== Board of education ==
The district's board of education, composed of nine members, sets policy and oversees the fiscal and educational operation of the district through its administration. As a Type II school district, the board's trustees are elected directly by voters to serve three-year terms of office on a staggered basis, with three seats up for election each year held (since 2012) as part of the November general election. The board appoints a superintendent to oversee the district's day-to-day operations and a business administrator to supervise the business functions of the district.
