= Carteret School District =

School district in Middlesex County, New Jersey, US

Address
- 599 Roosevelt Avenue Carteret, Middlesex County, New Jersey, 07008; United States
- Coordinates: 40.583577°N 74.218716°W

District information
- Grades: PreK to 12
- Superintendent: Rosa L. Diaz
- Business administrator: Carmela Collazo
- Schools: 6

Students and staff
- Enrollment: 4,009 (as of 2023–24)
- Faculty: 315.9 FTEs
- Student–teacher ratio: 12.7:1

Other information
- District Factor Group: B
- Website: www.carteretschools.org
| Ind. | Per pupil | District spending | Rank (*) | K-12 average | %± vs. average |
|---|---|---|---|---|---|
| 1A | Total Spending | $16,050 | 17 | $18,891 | −15.0% |
| 1 | Budgetary Cost | 11,721 | 6 | 14,783 | −20.7% |
| 2 | Classroom Instruction | 7,349 | 6 | 8,763 | −16.1% |
| 6 | Support Services | 1,350 | 3 | 2,392 | −43.6% |
| 8 | Administrative Cost | 1,516 | 64 | 1,485 | 2.1% |
| 10 | Operations & Maintenance | 1,301 | 16 | 1,783 | −27.0% |
| 13 | Extracurricular Activities | 136 | 10 | 268 | −49.3% |
| 16 | Median Teacher Salary | 59,440 | 24 | 64,043 |
Data from NJDoE 2014 Taxpayers' Guide to Education Spending. *Of K-12 districts with more than 3,500 students. Lowest spending=1; Highest=103

The Carteret School District is a comprehensive community public school district that serves students in pre-kindergarten through twelfth grade from Carteret, in Middlesex County, in the U.S. state of New Jersey.

As of the 2023–24 school year, the district, comprised of six schools, had an enrollment of 4,009 students and 315.9 classroom teachers (on an FTE basis), for a student–teacher ratio of 12.7:1.

== History ==
In 2016, borough voters turned down a ballot proposal to switch from an elected school board to an appointed board.

In September 2019, voters approved a referendum by a nearly 3-1 margin that would spend $37 million, including $7.4 million in state aid, for the construction of a new junior high school for 600 students in grades seven and eight, as well as expansion and renovation projects in all of the five existing school facilities.

The district had been classified by the New Jersey Department of Education as being in District Factor Group "B", the second-lowest of eight groupings. District Factor Groups organize districts statewide to allow comparison by common socioeconomic characteristics of the local districts. From lowest socioeconomic status to highest, the categories are A, B, CD, DE, FG, GH, I and J.

== Schools ==
Schools in the district (with 2023–24 enrollment data from the National Center for Education Statistics) are:

Elementary schools

- Columbus School with 625 students in grades PreK–4
  - Mayling Cardenas, principal
- Nathan Hale School with 439 students in grades PreK–4
  - Erika Barrett, principal
- Private Nicholas Minue School with 527 students in grades PreK–4
  - Cheryl Bolinger, principal

Middle schools

- Carteret Middle School with 567 students in grades 5–6
  - Merita Euell, principal
- Carteret Junior High School with 586 students in grades 7–8
  - Tara Romero, principal

High school

- Carteret High School with 1,182 students in grades 9–12
  - Joanna Joaquin, principal

== Administration ==
Core members of the district's administration are:

- Rosa L. Diaz, superintendent of schools
- Carmela Collazo, business administrator and board secretary

== Board of education ==
The district's board of education is composed of nine members who set policy and oversee the fiscal and educational operation of the district through its administration. As a Type II school district, the board's trustees are elected directly by voters to serve three-year terms of office on a staggered basis, with three seats up for election each year held (since 2012) as part of the November general election. The board appoints a superintendent to oversee the district's day-to-day operations and a business administrator to supervise the business functions of the district.
