= Union Valley, Kaufman County, Texas =

Union Valley, Texas
- Unincorporated community
- Location within Texas Location within the United States
- Coordinates: 32°41′50″N 96°18′02″W
- Country: United States
- State: Texas
- County: Kaufman
- Elevation: 469 ft (143 m)
- Time zone: UTC-6 (Central (CST))
  - Summer (DST): UTC-5 (CDT)
- GNIS feature ID: 1379195

Union Valley is an unincorporated community in Kaufman County, located in the U.S. state of Texas.
