= South River Public Schools =

School district in Middlesex County, New Jersey, US

Address
- 15 Montgomery Street South River, Middlesex County, New Jersey, 08882; United States
- Coordinates: 40.438268°N 74.382061°W

District information
- Grades: PreK-12
- Superintendent: Sylvia Zircher
- Business administrator: Johnny Rosa
- Schools: 5

Students and staff
- Enrollment: 2,435 (as of 2024–25)
- Faculty: 218.78 FTEs
- Student–teacher ratio: 11.13:1

Other information
- District Factor Group: CD
- Website: www.srivernj.org
Ind.	Per pupil	District spending	Rank (*)	K-12 average	%± vs. average
1A	Total Spending	$26,216	13	$28,764	−8.9%
1	Budgetary Cost	16,077	10	18,744	−14.2%
2	Classroom Instruction	9,404	14	10,818	−13.1%
6	Support Services	2,758	19	3,130	−11.9%
8	Administrative Cost	1,674	18	1,959	−14.5%
10	Operations & Maintenance	1,884	16	2,234	−15.7%
13	Extracurricular Activities	358	10	501	−28.5%
16	Median Teacher Salary	71,710	18	80,051
Data from NJDoE 2023-2024 Taxpayers' Guide to Education Spending. *Of K-12 districts with 1,800-3,500 students. Lowest spending=1; Highest=71

The South River Public Schools are a comprehensive community public school district that serves students in pre-kindergarten through twelfth grade from South River, in Middlesex County, in the U.S. state of New Jersey.

As of the 2024–25 school year, the district, comprised of five schools, had an enrollment of 2,435 students and 218.78 classroom teachers (on an FTE basis), for a student–teacher ratio of 11.13:1.

The district is classified by the New Jersey Department of Education as being in District Factor Group "CD", the sixth-highest of eight groupings. District Factor Groups organize districts statewide to allow comparison by common socioeconomic characteristics of the local districts. From lowest socioeconomic status to highest, the categories are A, B, CD, DE, FG, GH, I and J.

== Schools ==
Schools in the district (with 2024–25 enrollment data from the National Center for Education Statistics) are:

=== Preschools ===
- South River Early Learning Center with 151 students in PreK
  - Heather Lieberman, principal

=== Elementary schools ===
- South River Primary School with 508 students in grades PreK–2
  - Heather Lieberman, principal
- South River Elementary School with 496 students in grades 3–5
  - Christian J. Valentin-Gladden, principal

=== Middle school ===
- South River Middle School with 524 students in grades 6–8
  - Thomas Rizk, principal

=== High school ===
- South River High School with 716 students in grades 9–12
  - Jamie Kinard, principal

== Administration ==
Core members of the district's administration are:

- Sylvia Zircher, superintendent of schools
- Johnny Rosa, board secretary and business administrator

== Board of education ==
The district's board of education is comprised of nine members who set policy and oversee the fiscal and educational operation of the district through its administration. As a Type II school district, the board's trustees are elected directly by voters to serve three-year terms of office on a staggered basis, with three seats up for election each year held (since 2012) as part of the November general election. The board appoints a superintendent to oversee the district's day-to-day operations and a business administrator to supervise the business functions of the district.
