= Union Valley, New Jersey =

Populated place in Middlesex County, New Jersey, US

- Unincorporated community
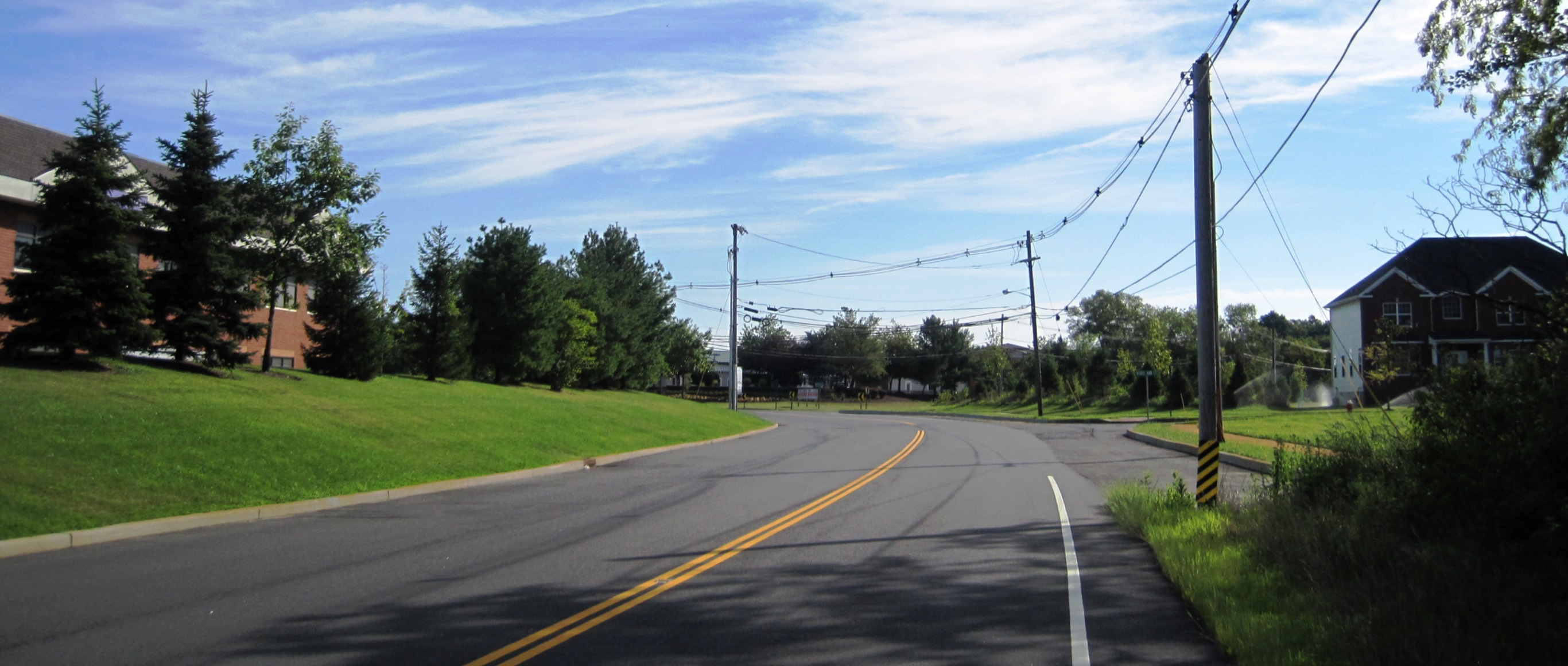
- Union Valley as seen from CR 615

- Location of Union Valley in Middlesex County Inset: Location of county within the state of New Jersey Union Valley (New Jersey) Union Valley (the United States)
- Coordinates: 40°18′13″N 74°27′22″W
- Country: United States
- State: New Jersey
- County: Middlesex
- Township: Monroe
- Elevation: 115 ft (35 m)
- GNIS feature ID: 881362

Union Valley is an unincorporated community located within Monroe Township in Middlesex County, in the U.S. state of New Jersey. Two large age-restricted communities lie within the settlement today, Clearbrook and Concordia. Other than those two communities, the only other buildings in the area are medical offices and facilities and some single-family homes along Union Valley Road (part of County Route 615 west of the area).
