= Spotswood Public Schools =

School district in Middlesex County, New Jersey, US

Address
- 105 Summerhill Road Spotswood, Middlesex County, New Jersey, 08884; United States
- Coordinates: 40.39413°N 74.393969°W

District information
- Grades: PreK-12
- Superintendent: Jeff Bicsko
- Business administrator: Vita Marino
- Schools: 4

Students and staff
- Enrollment: 1,610 (as of 2020–21)
- Faculty: 136.5 FTEs
- Student–teacher ratio: 11.8:1

Other information
- District Factor Group: DE
- Website: www.spsd.us
Ind.	Per pupil	District spending	Rank (*)	K-12 average	%± vs. average
1A	Total Spending	$16,785	13	$18,891	−11.1%
1	Budgetary Cost	12,781	12	14,783	−13.5%
2	Classroom Instruction	7,549	15	8,763	−13.9%
6	Support Services	1,992	23	2,392	−16.7%
8	Administrative Cost	1,258	2	1,485	−15.3%
10	Operations & Maintenance	1,608	27	1,783	−9.8%
13	Extracurricular Activities	358	12	268	33.6%
16	Median Teacher Salary	54,000	9	64,043
Data from NJDoE 2014 Taxpayers' Guide to Education Spending. *Of K-12 districts with up to 1,800 students. Lowest spending=1; Highest=49

The Spotswood Public Schools are a comprehensive community public school district that serves students in pre-kindergarten through twelfth grade from Helmetta and Spotswood, in Middlesex County, in the U.S. state of New Jersey.

Students from Helmetta, a non-operating district, attend school in Spotswood beginning in grammar school. Students from Milltown attend the high school as part of a sending/receiving relationship with the Milltown Public Schools.

As of the 2020–21 school year, the district, comprising four schools, had an enrollment of 1,610 students and 136.5 classroom teachers (on an FTE basis), for a student–teacher ratio of 11.8:1.

The district is classified by the New Jersey Department of Education as being in District Factor Group "DE", the fifth-highest of eight groupings. District Factor Groups organize districts statewide to allow comparison by common socioeconomic characteristics of the local districts. From lowest socioeconomic status to highest, the categories are A, B, CD, DE, FG, GH, I and J.

== Schools ==
Schools in the district (with 2020–21 enrollment data from the National Center for Education Statistics) are:

Elementary schools

- G. Austin Schoenly Elementary School with 207 students in grades PreK-1
  - Kate Gordon, principal
- E. Raymond Appleby Elementary School with 334 students in grades 2-5
  - Nancy Torchiano, principal

Middle school

- Spotswood Memorial Middle School with 349 students in grades 6-8
  - Dan Cugini, principal

High school

- Spotswood High School with 692 students in grades 9-12
  - Amy Jablonski, principal

== Administration ==
Core members of the district's administration are:

- Jeff Bicsko, superintendent
- Vita Marino, business administrator and board secretary

Bicsko, who was previously the Assistant Superintendent of the Middlesex County Vocational and Technical Schools, replaced Graham Peabody who retired on July 1, 2025 after spending his entire career in education in Spotswood, starting in 1995 as a teacher and starting in 2017 as Superintendent.

== Board of education ==
The district's board of education is composed of nine members who set policy and oversee the fiscal and educational operation of the district through its administration. As a Type II school district, the board's trustees are elected directly by voters to serve three-year terms of office on a staggered basis, with either one or two seats up for election each year held (since 2012) as part of the November general election. The board appoints a superintendent to oversee the district's day-to-day operations and a business administrator to supervise the business functions of the district.
