= Highland Park Public Schools =

School district in Middlesex County, New Jersey, US

Address
- 435 Mansfield Street Highland Park, Middlesex County, New Jersey, 08904; United States
- Coordinates: 40.496118°N 74.422631°W

District information
- Grades: Pre-K to 12
- Superintendent: Kristina Susca
- Business administrator: Linda Hoefele
- Schools: 4

Students and staff
- Enrollment: 1,635 (as of 2023–24)
- Faculty: 155.5 FTEs
- Student–teacher ratio: 10.5:1

Other information
- District Factor Group: GH
- Website: www.hpschools.net
Ind.	Per pupil	District spending	Rank (*)	K-12 average	%± vs. average
1A	Total Spending	$20,558	41	$18,891	8.8%
1	Budgetary Cost	15,006	34	14,783	1.5%
2	Classroom Instruction	8,825	34	8,763	0.7%
6	Support Services	2,678	40	2,392	12.0%
8	Administrative Cost	1,729	30	1,485	16.4%
10	Operations & Maintenance	1,406	13	1,783	−21.1%
13	Extracurricular Activities	366	14	268	36.6%
16	Median Teacher Salary	61,599	28	64,043
Data from NJDoE 2014 Taxpayers' Guide to Education Spending. *Of K-12 districts with up to 1,800 students. Lowest spending=1; Highest=49

The Highland Park Public Schools is a comprehensive community public school district that serves students in pre-kindergarten through twelfth grade from Highland Park, in Middlesex County, in the U.S. state of New Jersey.

As of the 2023–24 school year, the district, comprised of four schools, had an enrollment of 1,635 students and 155.5 classroom teachers (on an FTE basis), for a student–teacher ratio of 10.5:1.

== History ==
The original school building was designed by architect Alexander Merchant. Opened in September 1926, the school was named Franklin Junior High School, serving students through tenth grade and constructed at a cost of $360,000 (equivalent to $6.5 million in 2025). After appeals from residents, grades 11 and 12 were added and the building was renamed "Highland Park High School" in 1937, before which students from Highland Park completed their secondary school education at either New Brunswick High School or Metuchen High School.

The district had been classified by the New Jersey Department of Education as being in District Factor Group "GH", the third-highest of eight groupings. District Factor Groups organize districts statewide to allow comparison by common socioeconomic characteristics of the local districts. From lowest socioeconomic status to highest, the categories are A, B, CD, DE, FG, GH, I and J.

== Schools ==
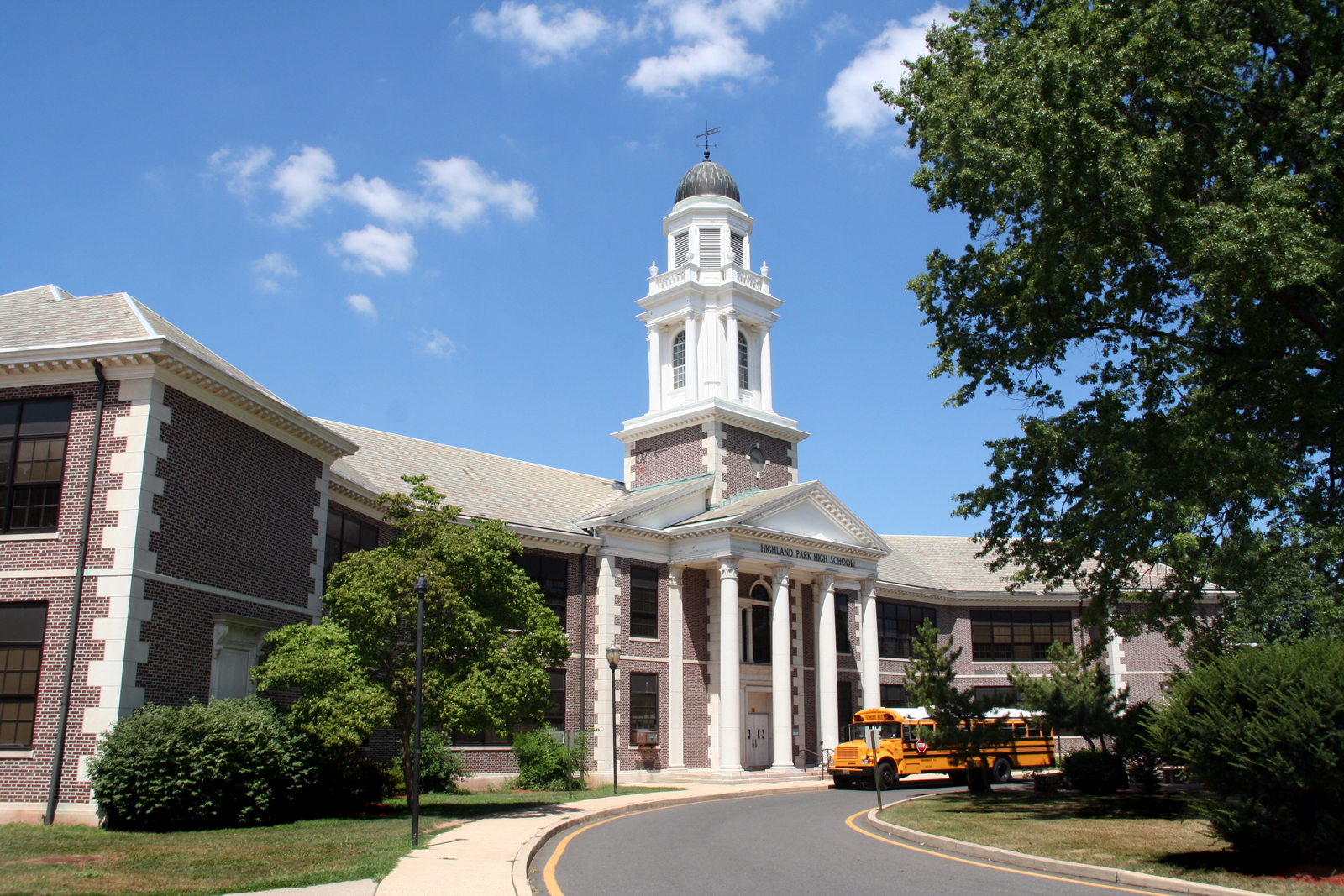
Highland Park High School

Schools in the district (with 2023–24 enrollment data from the National Center for Education Statistics) are:

Elementary schools

- Irving Primary School with 297 students in grades PreK–1
  - Megan McNally, principal
- Bartle Elementary School with 433 students in grades 2–5
  - Jennifer Knapp, principal

Middle school

- Highland Park Middle School with 346 students in grades 6–8
  - Caitlin Brady, principal

High school

- Highland Park High School with 518 students in grades 9–12
  - Kristina Donovan, principal

== Administration ==
Core members of the district's administration are:

- Kristina Nicosia, superintendent
- Linda Hoefele, business administrator and board secretary

== Board of education ==
The district's board of education is comprised of nine members who set policy and oversee the fiscal and educational operation of the district through its administration. As a Type II school district, the board's trustees are elected directly by voters to serve three-year terms of office on a staggered basis, with three seats up for election each year held (since 2012) as part of the November general election. The board appoints a superintendent to oversee the district's day-to-day operations and a business administrator to supervise the business functions of the district.
