= Middlesex County, New Jersey =

County in New Jersey, United States

- County
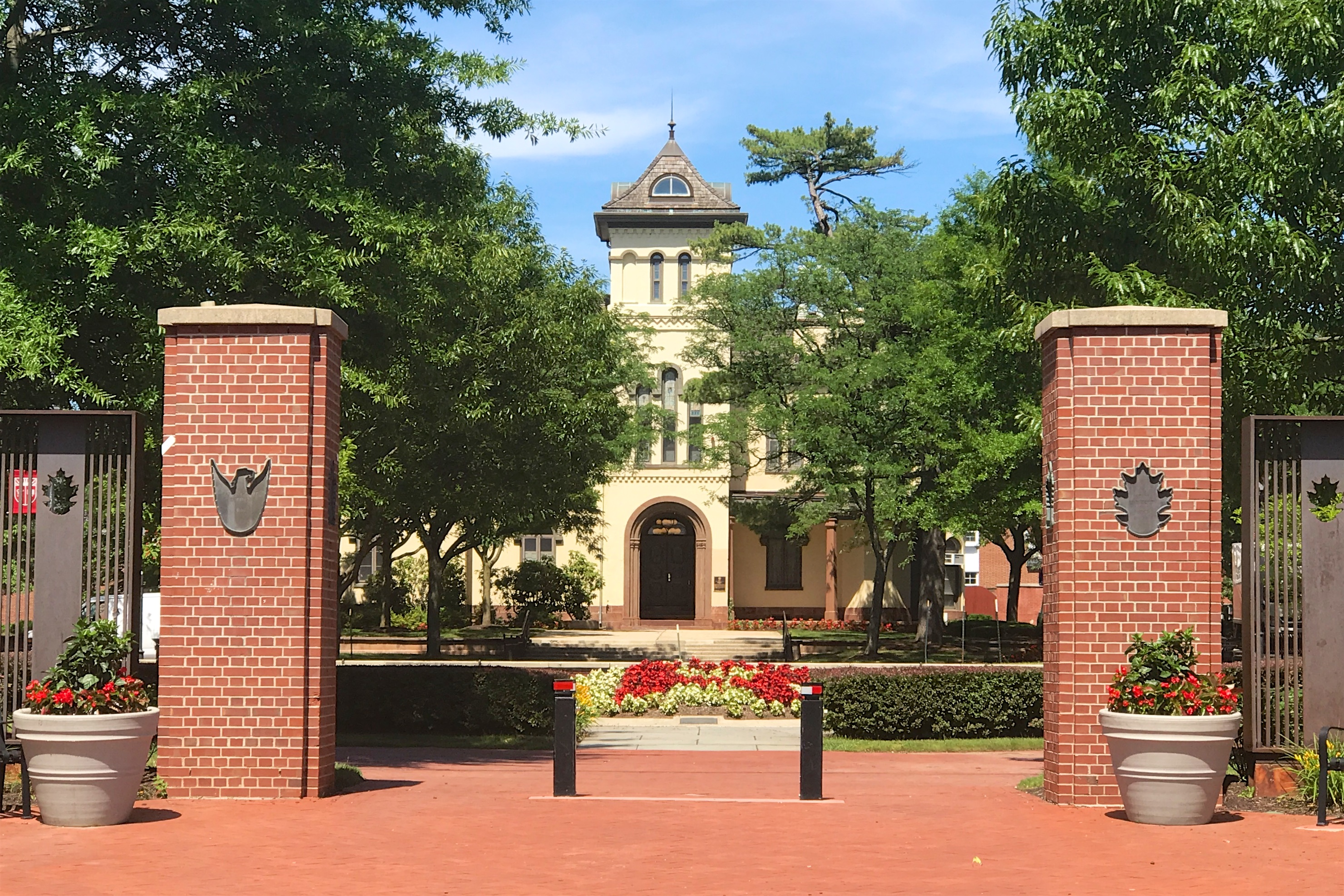
- The main campus of Rutgers University, New Jersey's flagship of higher education, in New Brunswick, a center for the sciences, arts, and cultural activities, and the county seat of Middlesex County

- Flag Seal Logo
- Nickname: The Greatest County in the Land
- Location within the U.S. state of New Jersey
- Interactive map of Middlesex County, New Jersey
- Coordinates: 40.44°N 74.41°W
- Country: United States
- State: New Jersey
- Founded: 1683
- Named for: Middlesex, England
- Seat: New Brunswick
- Largest municipality: Edison (population); Monroe Township (area)

Government
  - Commissioner director: Ronald G. Rios (D, term ends December 31, 2024)

Area
  - Total: 322.87 sq mi (836.2 km^{2})
  - Land: 309.22 sq mi (800.9 km^{2})
  - Water: 13.65 sq mi (35.4 km^{2}) 4.2%

Population (2020)
  - Total: 863,162
  - Estimate (2025): 883,335 ▲
  - Density: 2,791.4/sq mi (1,077.8/km^{2})
- Time zone: UTC−5 (Eastern)
  - Summer (DST): UTC−4 (EDT)
- Congressional districts: 6th, 12th
- Website: www.middlesexcountynj.gov

Middlesex County is a county located in the U.S. state of New Jersey, extending inland from the Raritan Valley region to the northern portion of the Jersey Shore. As of the 2020 United States census, the county was the state's third-most populous county with a population of 863,162, its highest decennial count ever and an increase of 53,304 (+6.6%) from the 2010 census count of 809,858, which in turn reflected an increase of 59,696 (8.0%) from the 750,162 counted in the 2000 census. The United States Census Bureau's Population Estimates Program estimated a 2025 population of 883,335, an increase of 20,173 (+2.3%) from the 2020 decennial census. The county seat of Middlesex is the city of New Brunswick, a center for the sciences, arts, and cultural activities, and the headquarters of the state's flagship academic institution, Rutgers University. The county forms part of the New York metropolitan area. Middlesex County calls itself The Greatest County in the Land. The county is part of the Central Jersey region of the state.

The county is located in the middle of the Northeast megalopolis of the U.S. The county's most populous place, with 107,588 residents as of the 2020 census, is Edison, while Monroe Township covers the largest area of any municipality, at 42.19 square miles (109.3 km^{2}). Since the 2010 census, the state's center of population is in East Brunswick; the center of population for New Jersey has been in Middlesex County since the 1900 census. Middlesex County hosts an extensive transportation network, including several rail stations along the heavily traveled Northeast Corridor Line of the New Jersey Transit commuter rail system, as well as the intersection of the New Jersey Turnpike and the Garden State Parkway, the state's two busiest motor vehicle roadways, in Woodbridge Township. Many towns within Middlesex County serve as commuter towns to New York City, as well as to employment centers in Jersey City, Newark, and other points in North Jersey.

The county was primarily settled due to its optimal location along the Raritan River. Middlesex was originally formed as one of four administrative districts within Province of East Jersey in 1675, together with Bergen, Essex and Monmouth districts. Middlesex County was formed within East Jersey on March 7, 1683. The population increased so the county was partitioned on October 31, 1693, into the townships of Piscataway, Perth Amboy, and Woodbridge. Adjacent Somerset County was established on May 14, 1688, created from portions of Middlesex County.

The county's first court met in June 1683 in Piscataway, and held session at alternating sites over the next century in Perth Amboy, Piscataway, and Woodbridge before relocating permanently to New Brunswick in 1778. Despite its status as a residential, commercial, and industrial stronghold and a centrally accessible transportation hub, Middlesex is also home to an extensive public park system with expansive greenways, totaling more than 6,300 acres (2,500 ha). Middlesex County is most demographically notable as the U.S. county with the highest concentration of Indians, at nearly 20% in 2020, spanning the county's boundaries between Little India, Edison/Iselin in the north and Monroe Township at its southern tip.

== Geography and climate ==
Middlesex has a hot-summer humid continental climate (Dfa) which borders a humid subtropical climate (Cfa) on Raritan Bay and Arthur Kill. Average monthly temperatures in downtown New Brunswick range from 31.9 °F (−0.1 °C) in January to 75.6 °F (24.2 °C) in July, while in South Amboy they range from 32.3 °F (0.2 °C) in January to 75.9 °F (24.4 °C) in July. In recent years, average temperatures in the county seat of New Brunswick have ranged from a low of 22 °F (−6 °C) in January to a high of 86 °F (30 °C) in July, although a record low of −13 °F (−25 °C) was recorded in January 1984 and a record high of 103 °F (39 °C) was recorded in July 1999. Average monthly precipitation ranged from 2.98 inches (76 mm) in February to 5.08 inches (129 mm) in July.

According to the U.S. Census Bureau, as of the 2020 Census, the county had a total area of 322.87 square miles (836.2 km^{2}), of which 309.22 square miles (800.9 km^{2}) was land (95.8%) and 13.65 square miles (35.4 km^{2}) was water (4.2%). The county is named after the historic English county of Middlesex.

Bisected by the Raritan River, the county is topographically typical of Central Jersey in that it is largely flat. The majority of the county is located on the inner coastal plain, with the remainder of the county being located on the Eastern Piedmont. The elevation ranges from sea level to 300 feet (91 m) above sea level on a hill scaled by Major Road/ Sand Hill Road near Route 1 in South Brunswick Township.

Another area with higher elevation in the county is the Perth Amboy Moraine, left by the southern limit of the Laurentide Ice Sheet. Only the far northeastern area of the county was glaciated, and the Perth Amboy Moraine stretches from Perth Amboy, through Woodbridge, Edison and Metutchen, and stradles the border of Edison and South Plainfield before exiting the county. The area includes peaks of over 200 feet.

New Brunswick, New Jersey

Climate chart (precipitation, max. and min. temperature)
J	F	M	A	M	J	J	A	S	O	N	D
3.6 39 22	3 43 24	4.2 51 30	4.2 62 40	4.2 72 50	4.4 81 60	5.1 86 65	4.2 84 64	4.5 77 55	3.8 66 43	3.8 55 36	4.1 44 27
- █ Average max. and min. temperatures in °F
- █ Precipitation totals in inches
- Source: The Weather Channel
Metric conversion
J	F	M	A	M	J	J	A	S	O	N	D
92 4 −6	76 6 −4	106 11 −1	107 17 4	106 22 10	112 27 16	129 30 18	105 29 18	115 25 13	97 19 6	97 13 2	103 7 −3
- █ Average max. and min. temperatures in °C
- █ Precipitation totals in mm

== Demographics ==
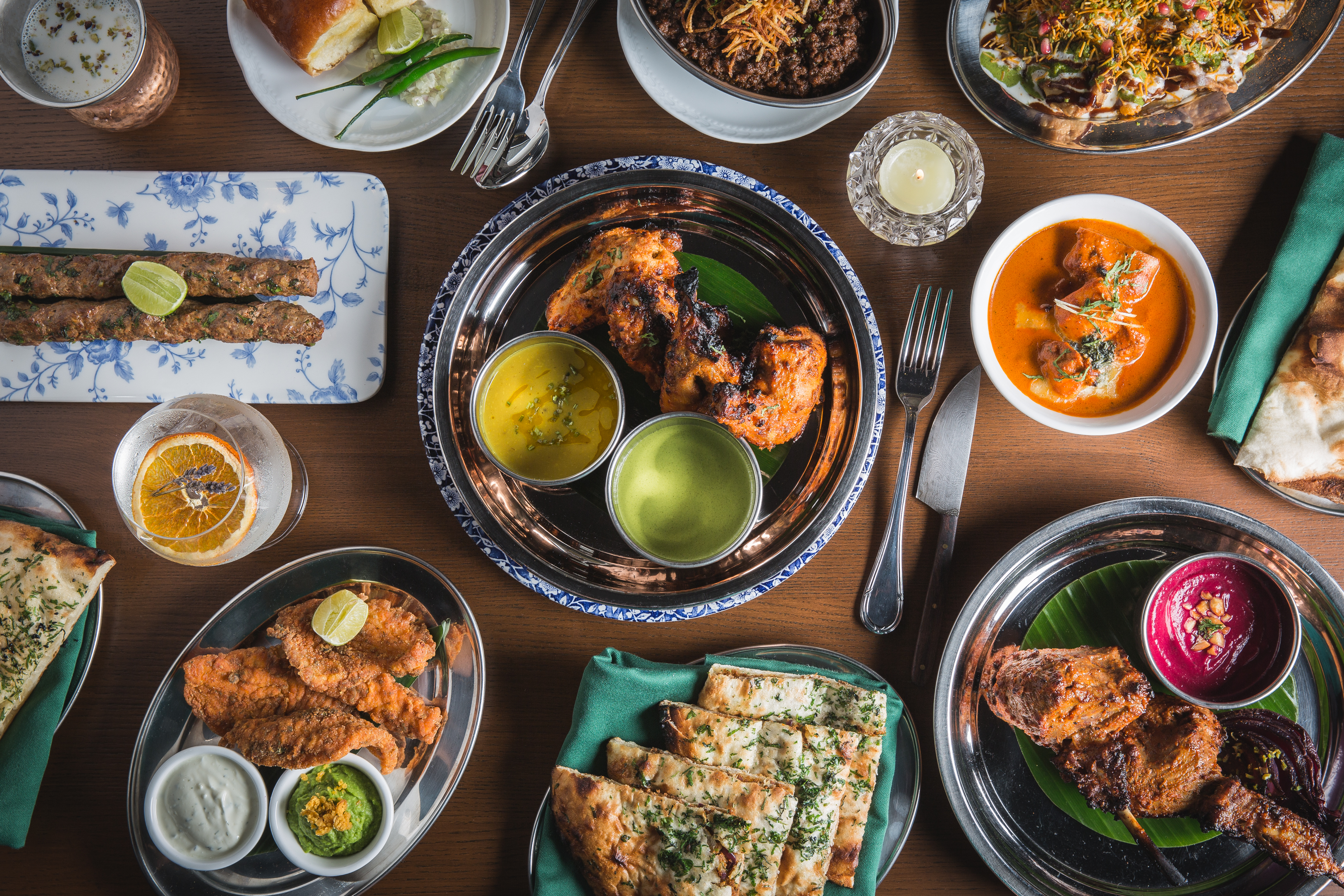
Indian cuisine is ubiquitously available in Middlesex County.

Historical population
Census	Pop.	Note	%±
1790	15,956		—
1800	17,890		12.1%
1810	20,381		13.9%
1820	21,470		5.3%
1830	23,157		7.9%
1840	21,893	*	−5.5%
1850	28,635		30.8%
1860	34,812		21.6%
1870	45,029		29.3%
1880	52,286		16.1%
1890	61,754		18.1%
1900	79,762		29.2%
1910	114,426		43.5%
1920	162,334		41.9%
1930	212,208		30.7%
1940	217,077		2.3%
1950	264,872		22.0%
1960	433,856		63.8%
1970	583,813		34.6%
1980	595,893		2.1%
1990	671,780		12.7%
2000	750,162		11.7%
2010	809,858		8.0%
2020	863,162		6.6%
2025 (est.)	883,335		2.3%
Historical sources: 1790-1990; 1970-2010 2000; 2010 2020 * = Lost territory in previous decade.

=== Indian community ===
Middlesex County is prominently known for its significant concentration of Indians. The growing Little India is a Desi-focused commercial strip in Middlesex County, the U.S. county with the highest concentration of Indians. The Oak Tree Road strip runs for about one-and-a-half miles through Edison and neighboring Iselin in Woodbridge Township, near the area's sprawling Chinatown and Koreatown, running along New Jersey Route 27. It is the largest and most diverse Desi cultural hub in the United States. Monroe Township in Middlesex County has experienced a particularly rapid growth rate in its Indian American population, with an estimated 5,943 (13.6%) as of 2017, which was 23 times the 256 (0.9%) counted as of the 2000 Census; and Diwali is celebrated by the township as a Hindu holiday. Carteret's Punjabi Sikh community, variously estimated at upwards of 3,000, is the largest concentration of Sikhs in New Jersey. In Middlesex County, election ballots are printed in English, Spanish, Gujarati, Hindi, and Punjabi.

=== Jewish community ===
Along with other counties in New Jersey, Middlesex is also home to a large Jewish community, especially Orthodox. The world's largest Jewish gathering outside of Israel occurred in Edison on December 1, 2024.

=== 2020 census ===
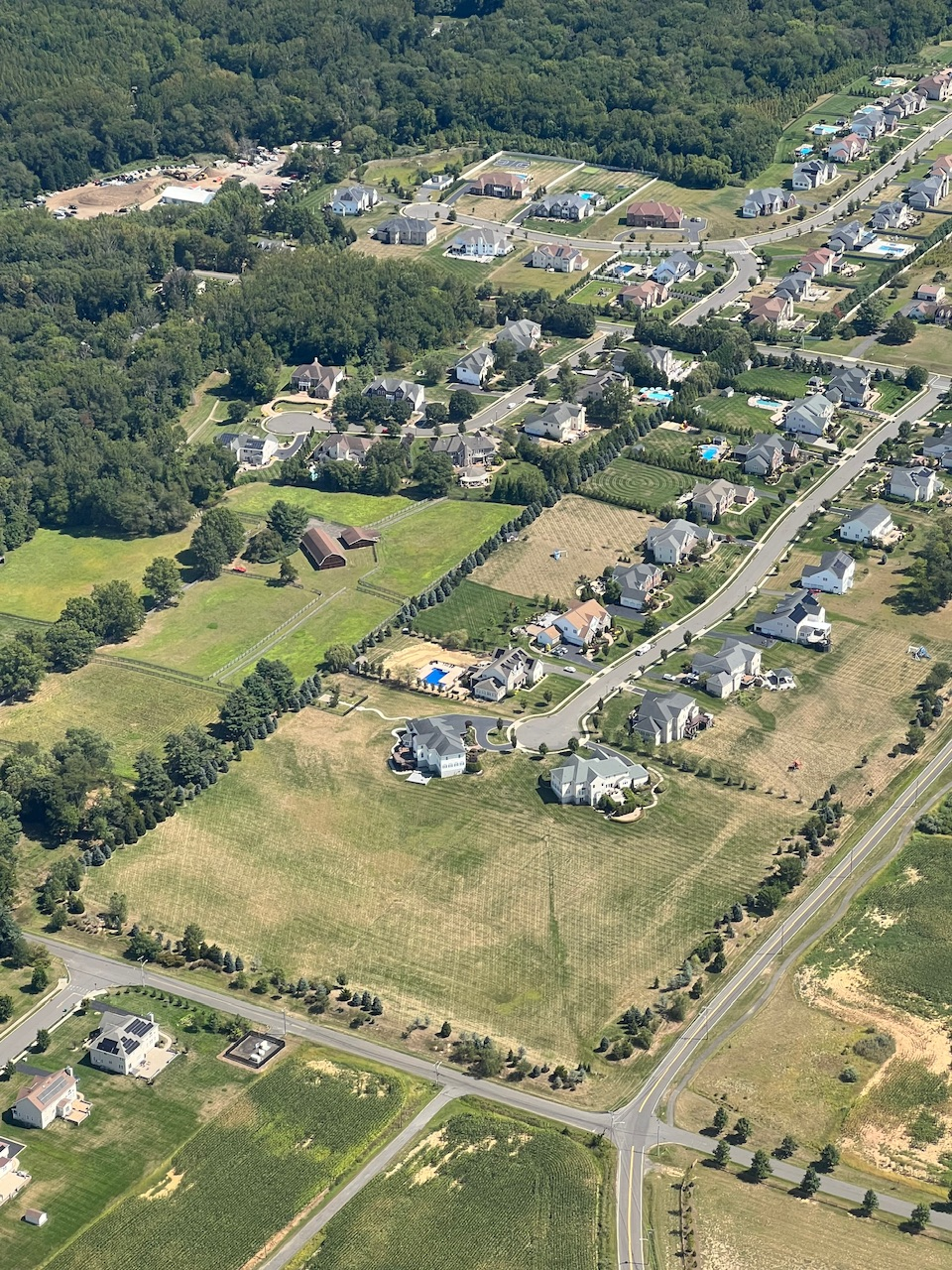
Aerial view in 2025 of Monroe Township, which has transitioned from a true exurb into a more suburban environment.

As of the 2020 census, the county had a population of 863,162, a median age of 38.8 years, 21.2% of residents under the age of 18, and 15.2% of residents aged 65 years or older; for every 100 females there were 95.9 males, and for every 100 females age 18 and over there were 93.6 males age 18 and over. Those residents lived in 300,547 households, including 209,808 families, resulting in a population density of 2,794 inhabitants per square mile (1,078.8/km^{2}) and 315,521 housing units at an average density of 1,021.4 per square mile (394.4/km^{2}). 4.7% of the housing units were vacant, and of the occupied units 61.8% were owner-occupied while 38.2% were renter-occupied; the homeowner vacancy rate was 1.1% and the rental vacancy rate was 5.5%. 34.8% of households had children under the age of 18 living with them, 54.1% were married couples living together, 15.6% had a male householder with no spouse or partner present, and 25.1% had a female householder with no spouse or partner present. About 22.2% of all households were made up of individuals, 9.7% had someone living alone who was 65 years of age or older, the average household size was 2.80, and the average family size was 3.32. The county's racial makeup was 41.9% white, 9.8% black or African American, 0.5% aboriginal American and Alaska Native, 26.5% Asian, <0.1% Native Hawaiian and Pacific Islander, 12.2% from some other race, and 9.1% from two or more races. Hispanic or Latino residents of any race comprised 22.4% of the population. 99.0% of residents lived in urban areas, while 1.0% lived in rural areas. The county's median household income was $93,418, and the median family income was $107,149. About 8.8% of the population were below the poverty line, including 11.1% of those under age 18 and 8.8% of those age 65 or over.

=== Racial and ethnic composition ===
Middlesex County, New Jersey – Racial and ethnic composition Note: the US Census treats Hispanic/Latino as an ethnic category. This table excludes Latinos from the racial categories and assigns them to a separate category. Hispanics/Latinos may be of any race.
Race / Ethnicity (NH = Non-Hispanic)	Pop 1980	Pop 1990	Pop 2000	Pop 2010	Pop 2020	% 1980	% 1990	% 2000	% 2010	% 2020
White alone (NH)	512,201	516,948	464,537	398,724	333,158	85.96%	76.95%	61.92%	49.23%	38.60%
Black or African American alone (NH)	34,941	49,733	64,435	71,557	78,719	5.86%	7.40%	8.59%	8.84%	9.12%
Native American or Alaska Native alone (NH)	554	808	805	1,193	1,183	0.09%	0.12%	0.11%	0.15%	0.14%
Asian alone (NH)	12,275	43,812	103,788	172,534	227,973	2.06%	6.52%	13.84%	21.30%	26.41%
Native Hawaiian or Pacific Islander alone (NH)	x	x	206	156	192	x	x	0.03%	0.02%	0.02%
Other race alone (NH)	1,784	703	2,046	2,720	7,053	0.30%	0.10%	0.27%	0.34%	0.82%
Mixed race or Multiracial (NH)	x	x	12,405	13,999	21,197	x	x	1.65%	1.73%	2.46%
Hispanic or Latino (any race)	34,138	59,776	101,940	148,975	193,687	5.73%	8.90%	13.59%	18.40%	22.44%
Total	595,893	671,780	750,162	809,858	863,162	100.00%	100.00%	100.00%	100.00%	100.00%

=== 2010 census ===
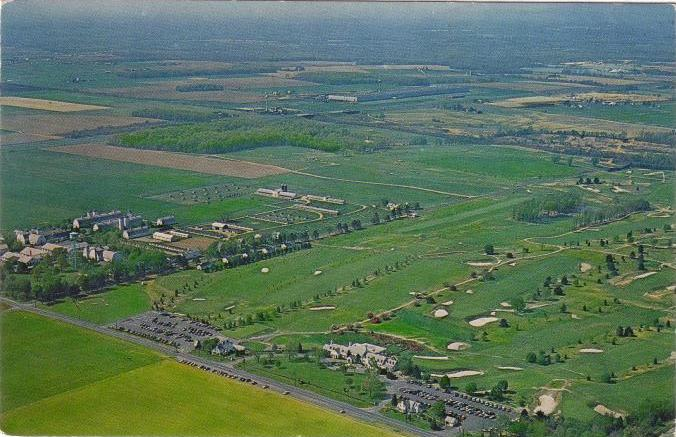
Aerial view in 2010 of Monroe Township housing tracts at the previously exurban southern tip of Middlesex County. Since then, significant new housing construction has rendered this area of the county with an increasingly suburban environment.

The 2010 United States census counted 809,858 people, 281,186 households, and 203,016 families in the county. The population density was 2,621.6 per square mile (1,012.2/km^{2}). There were 294,800 housing units at an average density of 954.3 per square mile (368.5/km^{2}). The racial makeup was 58.60% (474,589) White, 9.69% (78,462) Black or African American, 0.34% (2,777) Native American, 21.40% (173,293) Asian, 0.03% (251) Pacific Islander, 6.99% (56,569) from other races, and 2.95% (23,917) from two or more races. Hispanic or Latino of any race were 18.40% (148,975) of the population.

Of the 281,186 households, 34.4% had children under the age of 18; 55.9% were married couples living together; 11.8% had a female householder with no husband present and 27.8% were non-families. Of all households, 22.5% were made up of individuals and 8.9% had someone living alone who was 65 years of age or older. The average household size was 2.8 and the average family size was 3.29.

22.9% of the population were under the age of 18, 10.2% from 18 to 24, 28.3% from 25 to 44, 26.3% from 45 to 64, and 12.3% who were 65 years of age or older. The median age was 37.2 years. For every 100 females, the population had 96.4 males. For every 100 females ages 18 and older there were 94 males.

== Economy ==
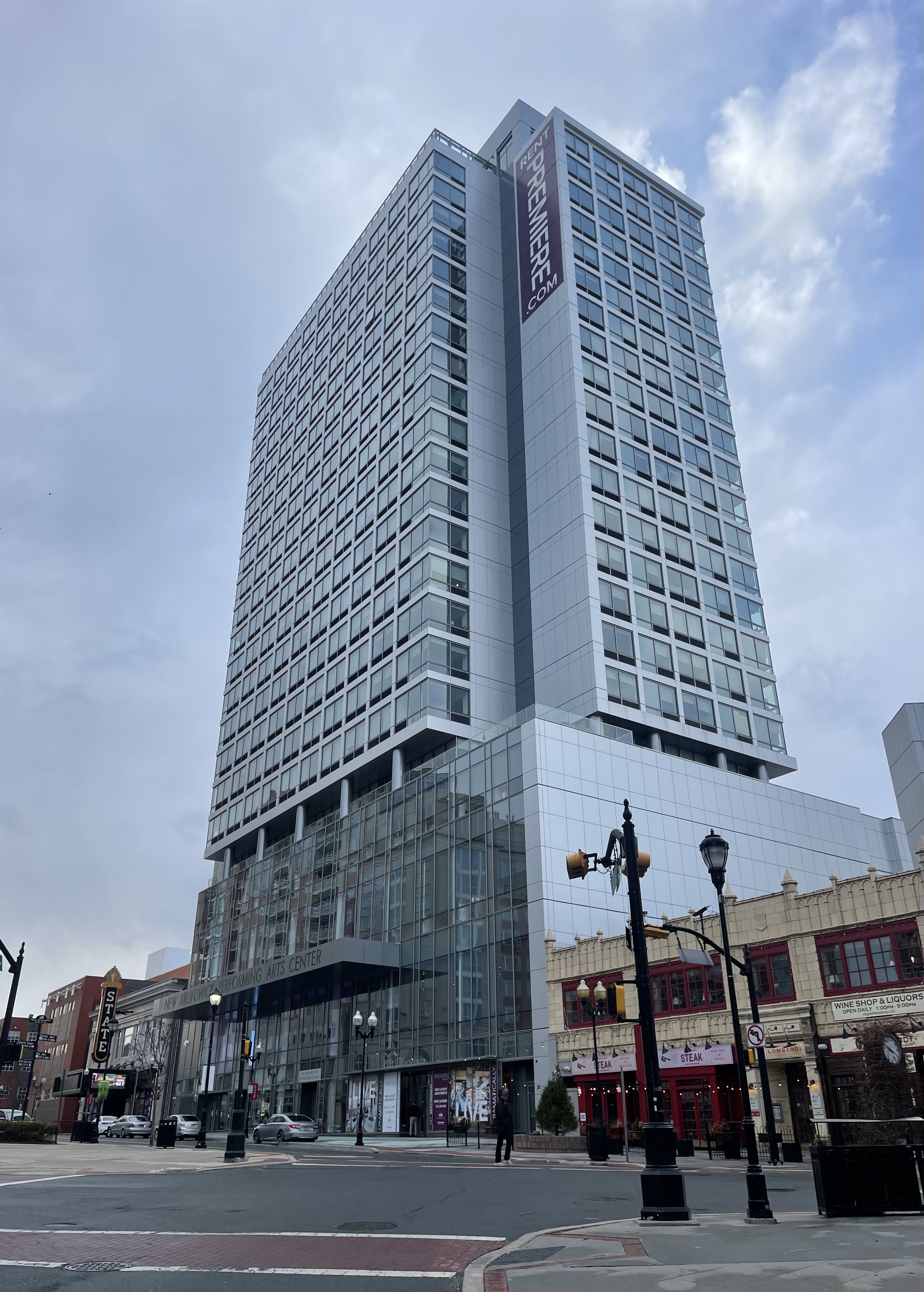
New Brunswick, nicknamed the Hub City of the state of New Jersey, is also Middlesex County's seat of government. The city is experiencing new high-rise construction and gentrification amidst an academic and cultural renaissance.

The Bureau of Economic Analysis calculated that the county's gross domestic product was $59.0 billion in 2021, which was ranked second in the state and was a 6.8% increase from the prior year.

Major non-governmental employers in Middlesex County include the following, grouped by ranges of employees:

- 9,010: Rutgers University
- 5,000 – 5,249: Robert Wood Johnson University Hospital
- 3,500 – 3,749: Bristol-Myers Squibb, Wakefern Food Corporation
- 3,000 – 3,249: Merrill Lynch, Novo
- 2,750 – 2,999: Johnson & Johnson, Prudential Insurance Company, Silverline Building Products, St. Peter's University Hospital, Telcordia Technologies
- 2,500 – 2,749: JFK Medical Center, Raritan Bay Medical Center
- 2,000 – 2,249: Pathmark
- 1,750 – 1,999: Home Depot, United Parcel Service
- 1,500 – 1,749: Hess Corporation, Dow Jones & Company, Siemens
- 1,250 – 1,499: AT&T, BASF (formerly Engelhard)
- 1,000 – 1,249: Aetna, Fujitsu, Prudential
- Undisclosed: Canon, Japanese company specializing in imaging products.

== History ==
Clay was once frequently mined in Middlesex County, with mining across the Raritan Formation continuing until the late twentieth century. Clay mining activity north of the Raritan River was particularly active near Woodbridge.

=== Etymology ===
Middlesex County is named after the historic county of the same name in England.

== Government ==
=== County government ===
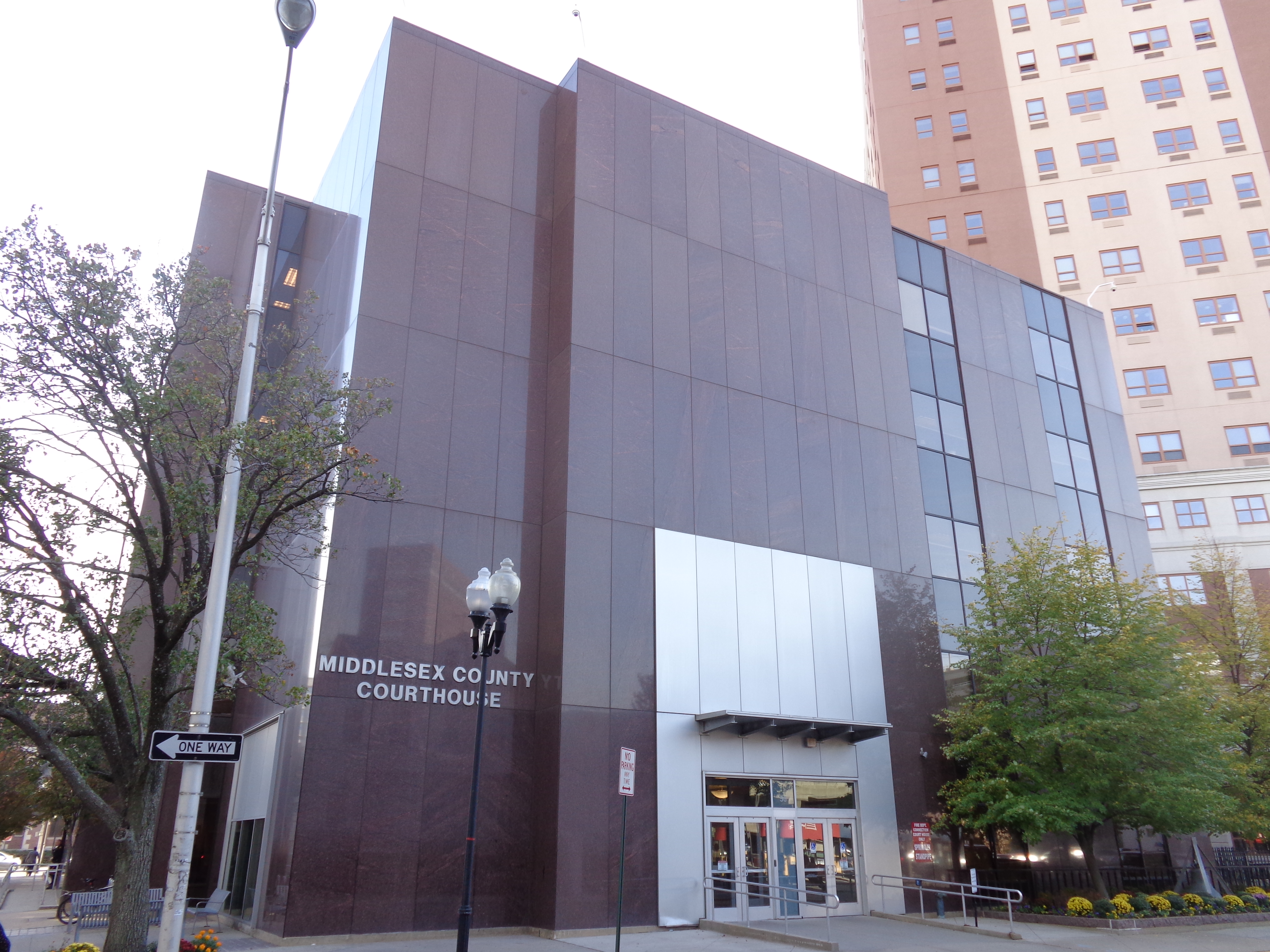
Middlesex County Courthouse

Middlesex County is governed by a Board of Commissioners, which is comprised of seven members who are elected at-large on a partisan basis to serve three-year terms of office on a staggered basis, with either two or three seats coming up for election each year as part of the November general election. At an annual reorganization meeting held in January, the board selects from among its members a Commissioner Director and deputy director. The Commissioner Director appoints commissioners to serve as chairpersons and members on the various committees which oversee county departments. Middlesex County also elects three "constitutional officers" whose existence is laid out in the New Jersey Constitution. The County Clerk and Surrogate serve five-year terms and the Sheriff serves a three-year term of office. In 2016, freeholders were paid $23,438 and the freeholder director was paid an annual salary of $24,428, though Ronald Rios has accepted a salary of $8,340 as director.

As of 2025, Middlesex County's Commissioners (with terms for director and deputy ending every December 31) are:

Commissioner	Party, Residence, Term
Director Ronald G. Rios	D, Carteret, 2027
Deputy Director Shanti Narra	D, North Brunswick, 2027
Claribel A. "Clary" Azcona-Barber	D, New Brunswick, 2025
Charles Kenny	D, Woodbridge Township, 2025
Leslie Koppel	D, Monroe Township, 2026
Chanelle Scott McCullum	D, Piscataway, 2025
Charles E. Tomaro	D, Edison, 2026

Article VII Section II of the New Jersey State Constitution requires each county in New Jersey have three elected administrative officials known as "constitutional officers." These officers are the County Clerk and County Surrogate (both elected for five-year terms of office) and the County Sheriff (elected for a three-year term). Middlesex county's constitutional officers are:

Title	Representative
County Clerk	Nancy Pinkin (D, East Brunswick, 2025)
Sheriff	Mildred S. Scott (D, Piscataway, 2025)
Surrogate	Claribel Cortes (D, North Brunswick, 2026)

Republicans have not won countywide in Middlesex County since 1991. The Middlesex County Prosecutor has been Yolanda Ciccone since June 2020. Middlesex County constitutes Vicinage 8 of the New Jersey Superior Court; the vicinage is seated at the Middlesex County Courthouse, at 56 Paterson Street in New Brunswick. The Middlesex Vicinage also has facilities for the Family Part at the Middlesex County Family Courthouse at 120 New Street, also in New Brunswick; there are also other facilities in New Brunswick and Perth Amboy for Probation. The Assignment Judge for Vicinage 8 is Alberto Rivas.

=== Federal representatives ===
The 6th and 12th congressional districts cover the county. For the 119th United States Congress, New Jersey's 6th congressional district is represented by Frank Pallone (D, Long Branch). For the 119th United States Congress, New Jersey's 12th congressional district is represented by Bonnie Watson Coleman (D, Ewing Township).

=== State representatives ===
The 25 municipalities of Middlesex County are part of seven legislative districts.

District	Senator	Assembly	Municipalities
12th	Owen Henry (R)	Alex Sauickie (R) Robert D. Clifton (R)	Helmetta, Old Bridge, and Spotswood. The remainder of this district covers portions of Burlington County, Monmouth County and Ocean County.
14th	Linda R. Greenstein (D)	Wayne DeAngelo (D) Tennille McCoy (D)	Cranbury Township, Jamesburg, Monroe Township, and Plainsboro. The remainder of this district covers portions of Mercer County.
16th	Andrew Zwicker (D)	Mitchelle Drulis (D) Roy Freiman (D)	South Brunswick. The remainder of this district covers portions of Hunterdon County, Mercer County, and Somerset County.
17th	Bob Smith (D)	Kevin Egan (D) Joseph Danielsen (D)	New Brunswick, North Brunswick, and Piscataway. The remainder of this district covers portions of Somerset County.
18th	Patrick J. Diegnan (D)	Robert Karabinchak (D) Sterley Stanley (D)	East Brunswick, Edison, Highland Park, Metuchen, Milltown, South Plainfield, and South River.
19th	Joe F. Vitale (D)	Craig Coughlin (D) Yvonne Lopez (D)	Carteret, Perth Amboy, Sayreville, South Amboy, and Woodbridge.
21st	Jon Bramnick (R)	Vincent Kearney (D) Andrew Macurdy (D)	Dunellen and Middlesex Borough. The remainder of this district covers portions of Somerset County, Morris County, and Union County.

=== Law enforcement ===
Thomas N. Acken served as the sheriff in 1891. Joseph Spicuzzo served in 2014 and was arrested for bribery. Mildred S. Scott is the current county sheriff, she was sworn in on January 1, 2011, as the first female sheriff of Middlesex County and the first African-American sheriff in the state of New Jersey.

== Politics ==
United States presidential election results for Middlesex County, New Jersey
Year	Republican		Democratic		Third party(ies)	
Year	No.	%	No.	%	No.	%
1896	9,304	58.73%	5,976	37.72%	563	3.55%
1900	9,347	55.19%	7,191	42.46%	399	2.36%
1904	10,117	57.22%	6,996	39.57%	569	3.22%
1908	11,270	57.51%	7,966	40.65%	359	1.83%
1912	4,743	25.78%	8,186	44.49%	5,470	29.73%
1916	11,851	53.51%	9,975	45.04%	320	1.44%
1920	29,334	69.70%	11,618	27.60%	1,136	2.70%
1924	34,556	62.28%	16,373	29.51%	4,553	8.21%
1928	38,714	52.35%	34,908	47.20%	328	0.44%
1932	32,673	40.45%	45,997	56.94%	2,111	2.61%
1936	32,959	34.57%	61,679	64.69%	702	0.74%
1940	41,709	38.26%	67,140	61.59%	164	0.15%
1944	45,232	42.12%	60,504	56.35%	1,642	1.53%
1948	49,810	42.86%	61,634	53.04%	4,766	4.10%
1952	73,577	50.32%	70,234	48.03%	2,413	1.65%
1956	100,071	60.54%	64,538	39.05%	677	0.41%
1960	83,025	41.60%	116,095	58.18%	436	0.22%
1964	63,370	29.39%	151,196	70.12%	1,052	0.49%
1968	96,515	42.79%	103,339	45.82%	25,676	11.38%
1972	149,033	61.41%	88,397	36.42%	5,264	2.17%
1976	113,539	47.14%	122,859	51.01%	4,466	1.85%
1980	122,354	50.73%	97,304	40.34%	21,548	8.93%
1984	160,221	59.82%	104,905	39.17%	2,727	1.02%
1988	143,422	54.30%	117,149	44.35%	3,548	1.34%
1992	108,701	38.10%	128,824	45.16%	47,746	16.74%
1996	82,433	31.90%	145,201	56.20%	30,752	11.90%
2000	93,545	36.14%	154,998	59.88%	10,306	3.98%
2004	126,492	42.76%	166,628	56.33%	2,685	0.91%
2008	123,695	38.43%	193,812	60.21%	4,367	1.36%
2012	107,310	35.55%	190,555	63.13%	3,995	1.32%
2016	122,953	37.42%	193,044	58.76%	12,560	3.82%
2020	143,467	38.32%	226,250	60.44%	4,645	1.24%
2024	162,459	44.49%	191,802	52.52%	10,926	2.99%

After being a Republican stronghold in the late 19th and early 20th centuries, Middlesex County leaned Democratic for much of the 20th century, beginning with Franklin Roosevelt's victory in the county in 1932. Throughout the twentieth century, in close elections, the county would always vote Democratic, sometimes by solid margins, but the county was willing to flip Republican in the midst of nationwide Republican landslides in the 1970s and 1980s. Since 1992, the county has always voted Democratic, however, the 2024 election saw the Democratic margin held to the single digits for the first time since 1992. As of August 1, 2020, there were a total of 545,795 registered voters in Middlesex County, of which 229,982 (42.1%) were registered as Democrats, 84,258 (15.4%) were registered as Republicans and 224,058 (41.1%) were registered as Unaffiliated. There were 7,497 (1.4%) voters registered to other parties.

Senate Class 1 election results

United States Senate election results for Middlesex County, New Jersey1
Year	Republican		Democratic		Third party(ies)	
Year	No.	%	No.	%	No.	%
2024	140,676	41.05%	188,482	55.00%	13,544	3.95%
2018	98,764	38.64%	148,806	58.21%	8,051	3.15%
2012	97,730	34.69%	178,686	63.42%	5,344	1.90%
2006	68,734	38.96%	102,198	57.92%	5,512	3.12%
2000	104,652	42.71%	132,476	54.06%	7,918	3.23%
1994	72,787	42.90%	90,873	53.56%	5,993	3.53%
1988	112,182	43.81%	141,067	55.09%	2,796	1.09%
1982	78,067	44.56%	94,351	53.86%	2,769	1.58%

Senate Class 2 election results

United States Senate election results for Middlesex County, New Jersey2
Year	Republican		Democratic		Third party(ies)	
Year	No.	%	No.	%	No.	%
2020	135,398	37.00%	221,802	60.61%	8,727	2.38%
2014	53,679	38.44%	83,732	59.96%	2,244	1.61%
2013	43,644	41.06%	61,362	57.73%	1,284	1.21%
2008	112,590	38.25%	175,284	59.55%	6,489	2.20%
2002	65,128	38.96%	98,019	58.64%	4,009	2.40%
1996	94,978	38.99%	133,123	54.65%	15,512	6.37%
1990	77,165	47.69%	80,080	49.49%	4,553	2.81%
1984	83,617	32.19%	172,478	66.39%	3,699	1.42%

|}

=== State elections ===
Governor election results

Gubernatorial election results for Middlesex County, New Jersey
Year	Republican		Democratic		Third party(ies)	
Year	No.	%	No.	%	No.	%
2025	101,830	36.65%	174,038	62.64%	1,992	0.72%
2021	90,297	43.25%	116,352	55.74%	2,109	1.01%
2017	70,940	40.26%	100,847	57.23%	4,418	2.51%
2013	101,619	58.30%	70,225	40.29%	2,468	1.42%
2009	94,506	47.42%	89,732	45.02%	15,057	7.56%
2005	75,021	39.22%	107,176	56.03%	9,085	4.75%
2001	66,749	35.73%	117,061	62.66%	2,999	1.61%
1997	83,149	39.33%	110,354	52.20%	17,911	8.47%
1993	104,381	48.37%	105,679	48.97%	5,738	2.66%
1989	67,054	35.11%	120,157	62.92%	3,749	1.96%
1985	113,020	65.85%	56,815	33.10%	1,804	1.05%
1981	89,618	47.68%	95,592	50.85%	2,763	1.47%
1977	72,477	39.72%	104,687	57.37%	5,324	2.92%
1973	44,844	25.78%	125,871	72.35%	3,267	1.88%
1969	114,446	59.72%	73,171	38.18%	4,011	2.09%
1965	61,063	34.48%	114,548	64.68%	1,479	0.84%
1961	65,577	39.70%	98,359	59.54%	1,262	0.76%
1957	50,243	36.00%	88,344	63.30%	975	0.70%
1953	40,685	34.93%	72,592	62.33%	3,189	2.74%

== Education ==
=== Higher education ===
- Middlesex County College (Edison – main campus; New Brunswick, Perth Amboy)
- Rutgers University New Brunswick Campus (New Brunswick, Piscataway)
- Rutgers Health (New Brunswick)
- Princeton University – Forrestal Campus (Plainsboro)
- DeVry University (North Brunswick)
- Chamberlain University (North Brunswick)
- New Brunswick Theological Seminary (New Brunswick Campus)

=== K-12 schools ===
School districts, all PreK/K-12 (except as indicated), include:

- Carteret School District
- Cranbury School District (K-8)
- Dunellen Public Schools
- East Brunswick Public Schools
- Edison Township Public Schools
- Highland Park Public Schools
- Jamesburg Public Schools (K-8)
- Metuchen School District
- Middlesex Board of Education
- Middlesex County Magnet Schools (9-12)
- Milltown Public Schools (K-8)
- Monroe Township School District
- New Brunswick Public Schools
- North Brunswick Township Public Schools
- Old Bridge Township Public Schools
- Perth Amboy Public Schools
- Piscataway Township Schools
- Sayreville Public Schools
- South Amboy Public Schools
- South Brunswick Public Schools
- South Plainfield Public Schools
- South River Public Schools
- Spotswood Public Schools
- West Windsor-Plainsboro Regional School District
- Woodbridge Township School District

== Infrastructure ==
=== Transportation ===
==== Roads and Highways ====
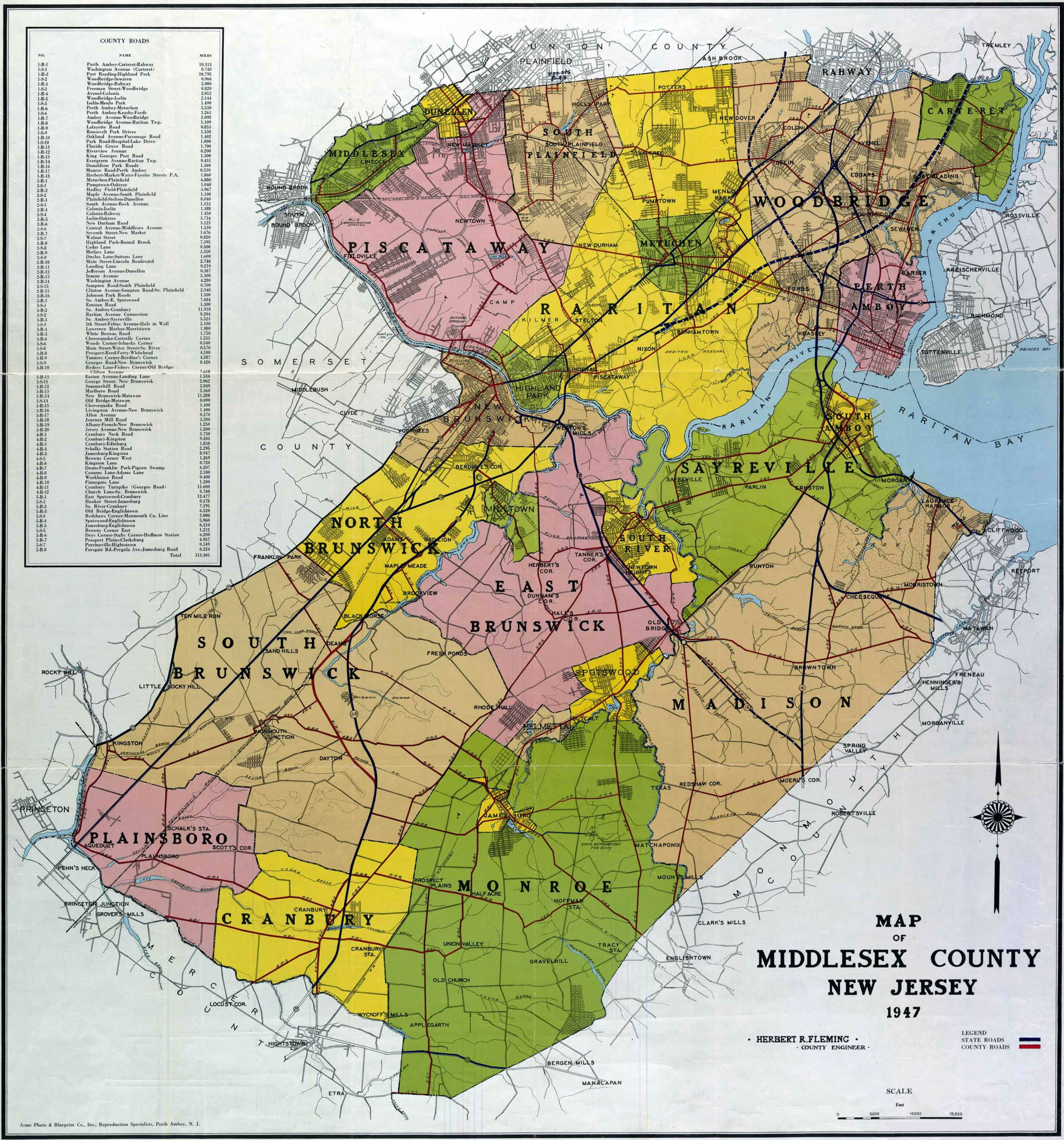
1947 road map

Middlesex County hosts various county roads, state routes, US routes, and interstate highways, as well as toll highways. As of May 2010, the county had a total of 2,584.38 miles (4,159.16 km) of roadways, of which 2,118.08 miles (3,408.72 km) were maintained by the municipality, 292.16 miles (470.19 km) by Middlesex County and 131.48 miles (211.60 km) by the New Jersey Department of Transportation, 41.49 miles (66.77 km) by the New Jersey Turnpike Authority and 1.17 miles (1.88 km) by the Port Authority of New York and New Jersey.

County roads include CR 501, CR 514, CR 516 (only in Old Bridge), CR 520 (only in Old Bridge), CR 522, CR 527, CR 529, CR 531, CR 535, and CR 539 (only in Cranbury).

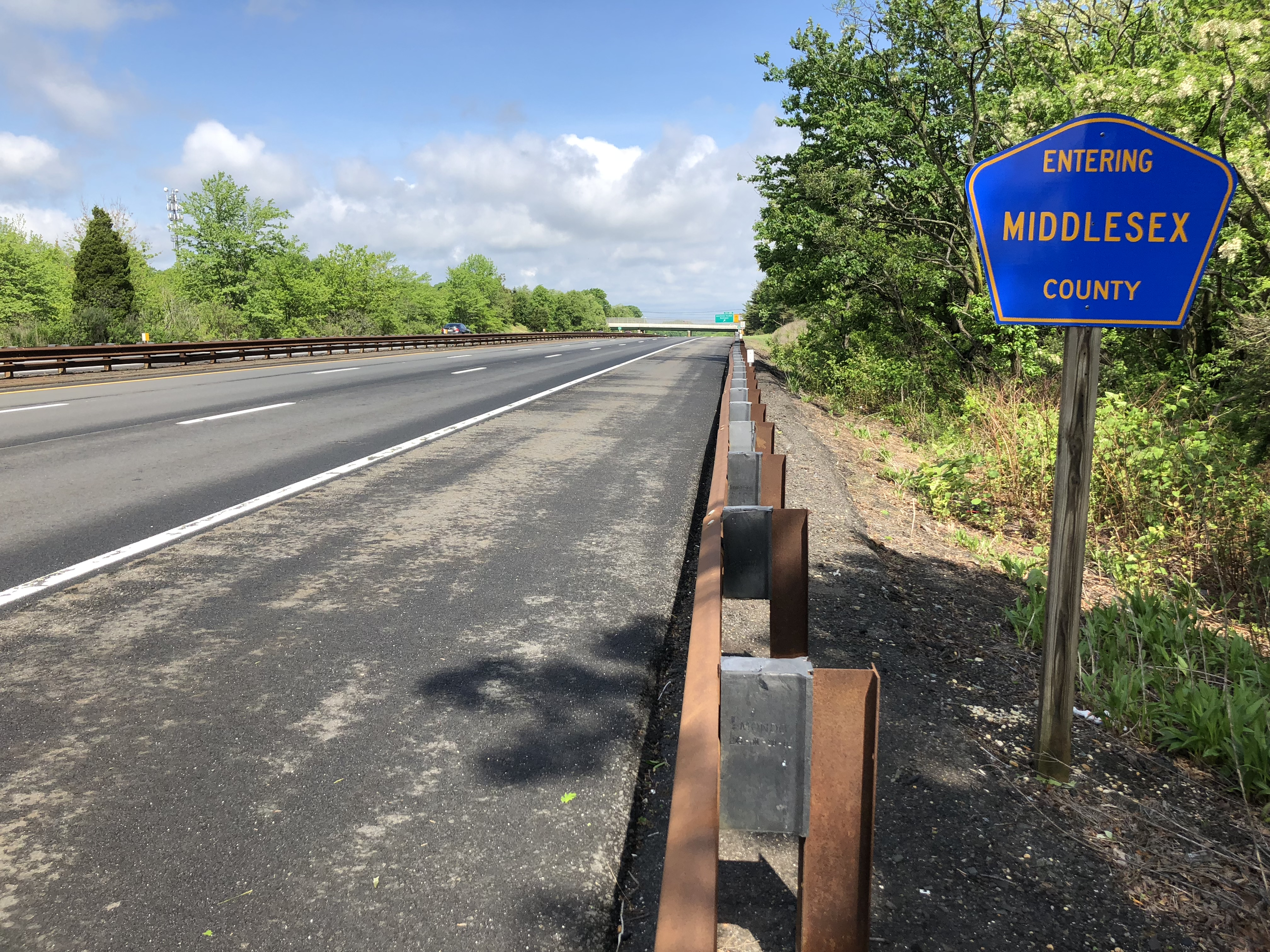
Garden State Parkway northbound entering Middlesex County

The state routes are: Route 18, Route 26 (only in North Brunswick – entirely concurrent with Livingston Avenue), Route 27, Route 28, Route 32, Route 33 (only in Monroe Township), Route 34 (only in Old Bridge), Route 35, Route 91 (concurrent with Jersey Avenue in North Brunswick and entering New Brunswick), Route 171, Route 172 (only in New Brunswick), Route 184 and Route 440.

U.S. Routes include: Route 1, Route 9, Route 1/9 (only in Woodbridge) and Route 130.

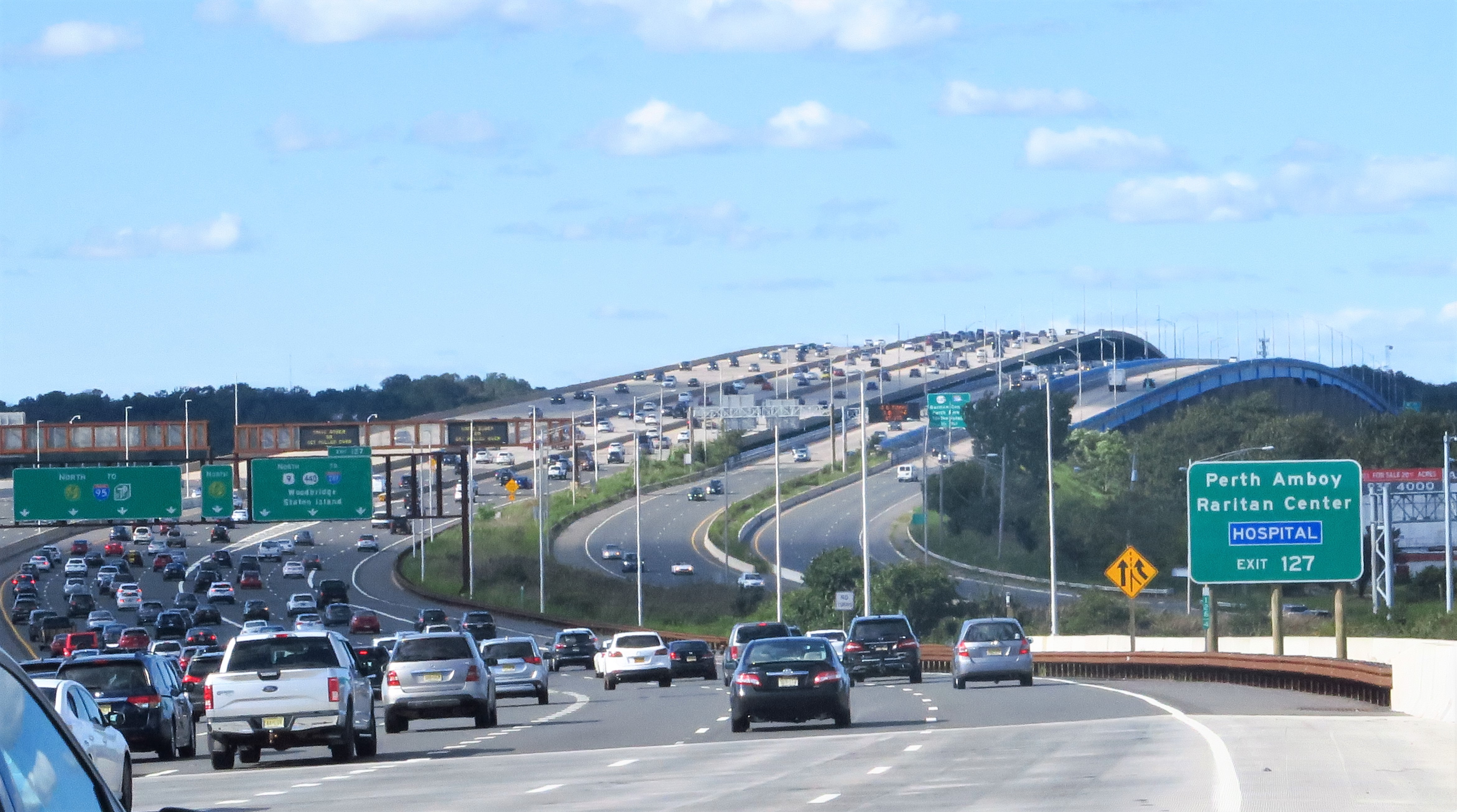
The Governor Alfred E. Driscoll Bridge on the Garden State Parkway crosses the Raritan River near its mouth at the Raritan Bay. The bridge, connecting the communities of Woodbridge Township to the north and Sayreville to the south, is the world's widest and one of the busiest motor vehicle bridges

The county also includes some limited access highways and Interstates as well. Middlesex County hosts the southern end of I-287 which turns into Route 440 that connects to the Outerbridge Crossing. The Garden State Parkway passes through the eastern part of the county, which features nine interchanges and the northern start/end of the split-roadways (Express & Local Lanes). The New Jersey Turnpike carries I-95 through the center of the county. The Turnpike has five interchanges in Middlesex County: Exit 12 in Carteret, Exit 11 in Woodbridge, Exit 10 in Edison, Exit 9 in East Brunswick and Exit 8A in Monroe Township.

The New Jersey Department of Transportation has upgraded the Route 18 "avenue" to a freeway between the Route 1 interchange all the way up to the new 18 Extension in Piscataway.

The Turnpike Authority planned to build Route 92, which was to start near the intersection of Ridge Road & Route 1 in South Brunswick to Interchange 8A in Monroe Township. This plan was cancelled on December 1, 2006.

The southern end of the "dual-dual" configuration (inner car lanes and outer truck lanes) used to be one mile south of Interchange 8A at the border of Cranbury and Monroe Township. It was relocated to Exit 6 in Mansfield Township in Burlington County after the Turnpike widening project was completed in early November 2014.

==== Public transportation ====
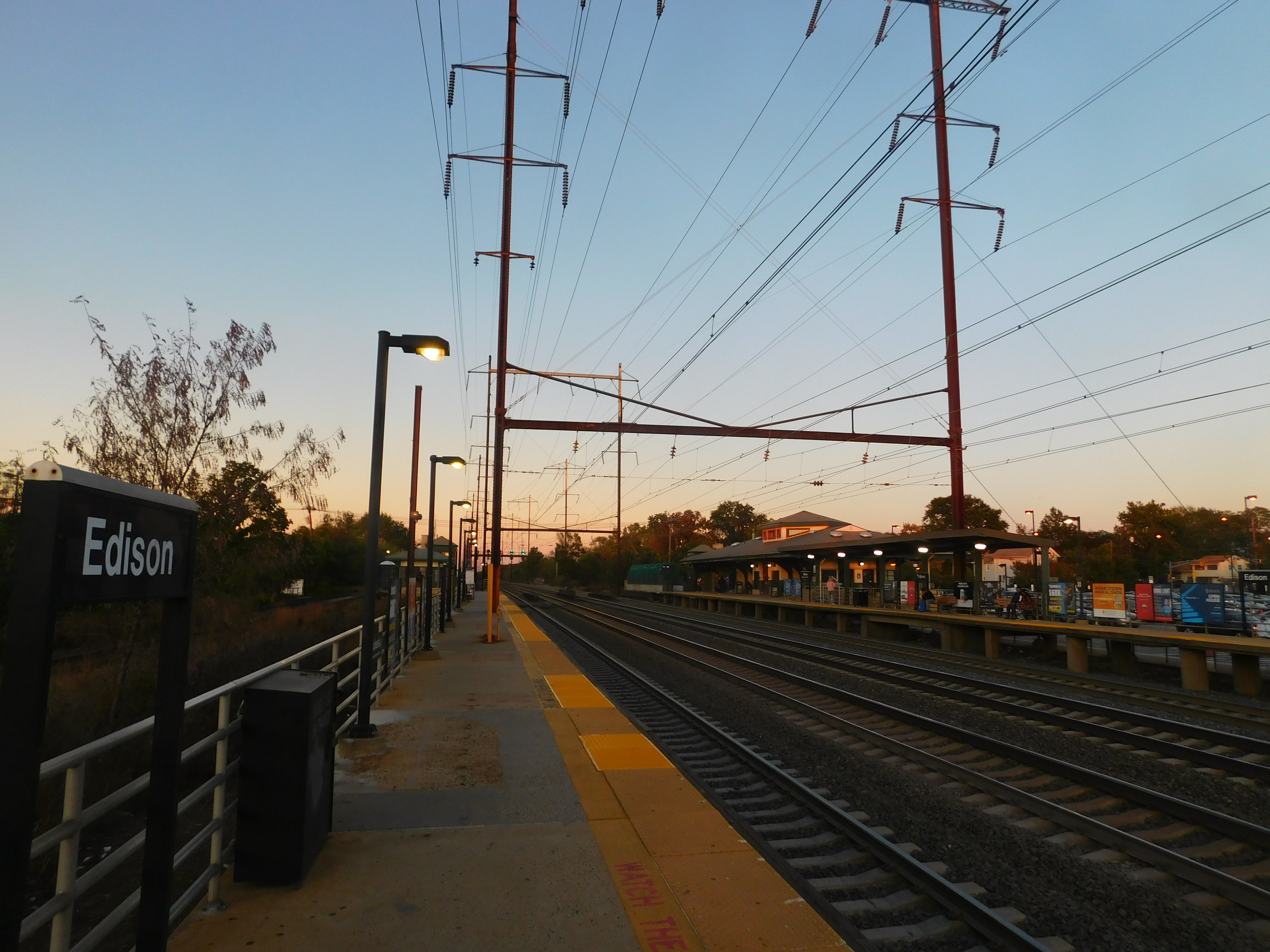
Edison station, located in the township of Edison, is a stop on New Jersey Transit's Northeast Corridor Line

NJ Transit provides Middlesex County with frequent commuter rail service along the North Jersey Coast Line, Northeast Corridor Line, and Raritan Valley Line. The North Jersey Coast Line runs through the eastern part of the county. The Northeast Corridor Line runs through the northern and central part of the county. The Raritan Valley Line serves Dunellen and is accessible to other communities along the county's northern border with Union and Somerset counties.

Intercity rail service is provided by Amtrak. The routes that run through Middlesex County are the Acela Express, Keystone, Northeast Regional, and Vermonter services, although only the Keystone and Northeast Regional have regular stops within Middlesex County, at either New Brunswick or Metropark station. The Acela service also occasionally stops at Metropark.

Bus service in Middlesex County is provided by New Jersey Transit, Coach USA's Suburban Transit, the extensive Rutgers Campus bus network, the MCAT shuttle system, and DASH buses. There are bus routes that serve all townships in the county on weekdays, and studies are being conducted to create the New Brunswick Bus Rapid Transit system.

=== Healthcare ===
The county offers more than 1,900 inpatient beds among five major hospitals.

Hospitals
Hospital	Town	Type	Beds	Health Network
JFK Medical Center	Edison	Acute	498	Hackensack Meridian Health
PSE&G Children's Specialized Hospital	New Brunswick	Pediatric Rehabilitation	140	RWJBarnabas Health
Raritan Bay Medical Center (Old Bridge)	Old Bridge	Acute	113	Hackensack Meridian Health
Raritan Bay Medical Center (Perth Amboy)	Perth Amboy	Acute	388	Hackensack Meridian Health
Robert Wood Johnson University Hospital	New Brunswick	Major Teaching	465	RWJBarnabas Health
The Bristol-Myers Squibb Children's Hospital	New Brunswick	Acute Pediatric	105	RWJBarnabas Health
Rutgers Cancer Institute of New Jersey	New Brunswick	Research, Cancer		RWJBarnabas Health
St. Peter's University Hospital	New Brunswick	Acute Teaching	478	Saint Peters HCS
Penn Medicine Princeton Medical Center	Plainsboro	Acute Teaching	305	Penn Medicine

== Municipalities ==
The 25 municipalities in Middlesex County (with 2010 Census data for population, housing units and area in square miles) are: Other, unincorporated communities in the county are listed next to their parent municipality. Many of these areas are census-designated places that have been defined by the United States Census Bureau for enumeration purposes within a Township and for which 2010 population data is included in parentheses.

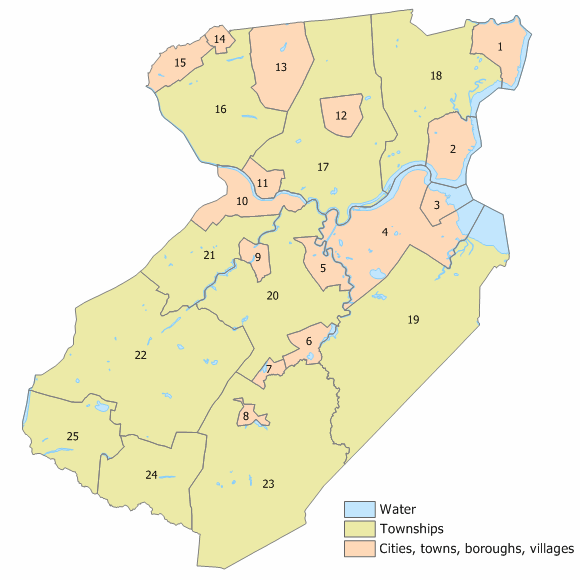
Index map of County municipalities (see map key index in table below)

Municipality	Map key	Municipal type	Population	Housing units	Total area	Water area	Land area	Pop. density	Housing density	School District	Unincorporated communities
Carteret	1	Borough	25,326	8,148	5.00	0.58	4.42	5,171.1	1,844.4	Carteret	Chrome; West Carteret
Cranbury	24	Township	3,842	1,371	13.40	0.15	13.25	291.2	103.5	Princeton (9–12) (S/R); Cranbury (PK-8)	Cranbury CDP (2,400); Cranbury Station; Wyckoffs Mills
Dunellen	14	Borough	7,637	2,683	1.05	0.00	1.05	6,894.8	2,559.7	Dunellen	
East Brunswick	20	Township	49,715	17,367	22.27	0.57	21.70	2,189.6	800.4	East Brunswick	Brookview; Dunhams Corner; Fairview Knolls; Farrington Lake Heights; Gillilandtown; Halls Corner; Herberts; Jamesburg Park; Lawrence Brook Manor; Newton Heights; Old Bridge; Orchard Heights; Patricks Corner; Paulas Corner; Tanners Corner; Washington Heights; Westons Mills
Edison	17	Township	107,588	36,302	30.64	0.70	29.94	3,339.0	1,212.5	Edison Township	Bonhamtown; Clara Barton; Greensand; Haven Homes; Lahiere; Lincoln Park; Lindenau; Martins Landing; Menlo Park; New Dover; New Durham; Nixon; North Edison; Oak Tree; Phoenix; Potters; Pumptown; Raritan Manor Rutgers University-Livingston Campus CDP (part; 3,545); Sand Hills; Stelton; Valentine; Washington Park
Helmetta	7	Borough	2,455	920	0.91	0.06	0.85	2,562.9	1,082.6	Spotswood	
Highland Park	11	Borough	15,072	6,203	1.82	0.01	1.81	7,728.1	3,428.5	Highland Park	
Jamesburg	8	Borough	5,783	2,267	0.88	0.01	0.88	6,741.8	2,583.9	Monroe Township (9–12) (S/R); Jamesburg (PK-8)	
Metuchen	12	Borough	15,049	5,440	2.77	0.00	2.76	4,910.4	1,967.9	Metuchen	Jefferson Park; Robinvale
Middlesex	15	Borough	14,636	5,148	3.54	0.02	3.52	3,876.2	1,463.5	Middlesex	
Milltown	9	Borough	7,037	2,698	1.60	0.04	1.55	4,443.0	1,739.0	Spotswood (9–12) (S/R); Milltown (PK-8)	
Monroe Township	23	Township	48,594	18,002	42.23	0.26	41.97	932.3	428.9	Monroe Township	Applegarth; Clearbrook; Clearbrook CDP (2,909); Concordia CDP (2,445); Encore at Monroe CDP (625); Forsgate CDP (2,056); Gravel Hill; Half Acre; Hoffman; Jamesburg Gardens; Matchaponix; Middlesex Downs; Monroe Manor CDP (2,178); Mounts Mills; Old Church; Outcalt; The Ponds CDP (941); Prospect Plains; Regency at Monroe CDP (2,036); Renaissance at Monroe CDP (637); Rossmoor CDP (2,992); Shore Road Estates; Spotswood Manor; Stonebridge CDP (1,616); Texas; Tracy; Union Valley; Whittingham CDP (2,348); Wyckoffs Mills
New Brunswick	10	City	55,266	15,053	5.79	0.56	5.23	10,556.4	2,879.7	New Brunswick	Edgebrook; Feaster Park; Lincoln Park; Raritan Gardens; Westons Mills
North Brunswick	21	Township	43,905	15,045	12.27	0.27	12.00	3,396.2	1,254.1	North Brunswick Township	Adams; Berdines Corner; Black Horse; Franklin Park; Georges Road; Maple Meade; Patricks Corner; Red Lion
Old Bridge	19	Township	66,876	24,638	40.78	2.72	38.06	1,717.7	647.3	Old Bridge Township	Browntown; Brownville CDP (2,383); Brunswick Gardens; Cheesequake; Cottrell Corners; Laurence Harbor CDP (6,635); Madison Park CDP (8,050); Matchaponix; Moerls Corner; Morristown; Old Bridge CDP (27,210); Parlin; Redshaw Corner; Runyon; Sayerwood South; South Old Bridge; Texas
Perth Amboy	2	City	55,436	16,556	5.96	1.26	4.70	10,806.8	3,521.0	Perth Amboy	Barber; Harbor Terrace; John J Delaney Homes; Maurer; William Dunlap Homes
Piscataway	16	Township	60,804	17,777	19.03	0.19	18.83	2,975.5	943.8	Piscataway Township	Fieldville; New Market; Newtown; North Stelton; Possumtown; Randolphville; Raritan Landing; Riverview Manor; Rutgers University-Busch Campus CDP (4,586); Rutgers University-Livingston Campus CDP (part; 3,545); Society Hill CDP (3,829)
Plainsboro	25	Township	24,084	10,089	12.21	0.42	11.78	1,951.6	856.1	West Windsor-Plainsboro	Plainsboro Center CDP (2,760); Princeton Meadows CDP (14,776); Schalks; Scotts Corner
Sayreville	4	Borough	45,345	16,393	18.70	2.86	15.84	2,695.7	1,034.8	Sayreville	Crossmans; Ernston; Gillespie; Laurel Park; MacArthur Manor; Melrose; Morgan; Morgan Heights; Parlin; Phoenix; Runyon; Sayre Woods; Sayreville Junction; Sayreville Station
South Amboy	3	City	9,411	3,576	2.69	1.15	1.55	5,577.1	2,310.7	South Amboy	Mechanicsville; Thomas J Dohany Homes
South Brunswick	22	Township	47,043	15,708	41.04	0.39	40.65	1,068.1	386.4	South Brunswick	Cottageville; Dayton CDP (8,138); Deans CDP (1,615); Franklin Park; Fresh Ponds; Heathcote CDP (7,154); Kendall Park CDP (9,989); Kingston CDP (1,222); Little Rocky Hill; Monmouth Junction CDP (8,895); Sand Hills; South Brunswick Terrace
South Plainfield	13	Borough	24,338	8,093	8.36	0.03	8.33	2,808.5	971.9	South Plainfield	Avon Park; Samptown
South River	5	Borough	16,118	5,957	2.92	0.15	2.77	5,781.4	2,151.4	South River	Newton Heights
Spotswood	6	Borough	8,163	3,242	2.47	0.20	2.27	3,642.2	1,430.1	Spotswood	East Spotswood; Outcalt
Woodbridge	18	Township	103,639	36,124	24.51	1.29	23.21	4,290.0	1,556.2	Woodbridge Township	Avenel CDP (16,920); Boynton Beach; Colonia CDP (18,609); Edgars; Fords CDP (12,941); Hazelton; Hopelawn CDP (2,603); Iselin CDP (20,088); Keasbey CDP (3,027); Lynn Woodoaks; Menlo Park Terrace CDP (2,806); Port Reading CDP (3,921); Sand Hills; Sewaren CDP (2,885); Shore View; Woodbridge CDP (19,839); Woodbridge Oaks

== Parks and recreation ==
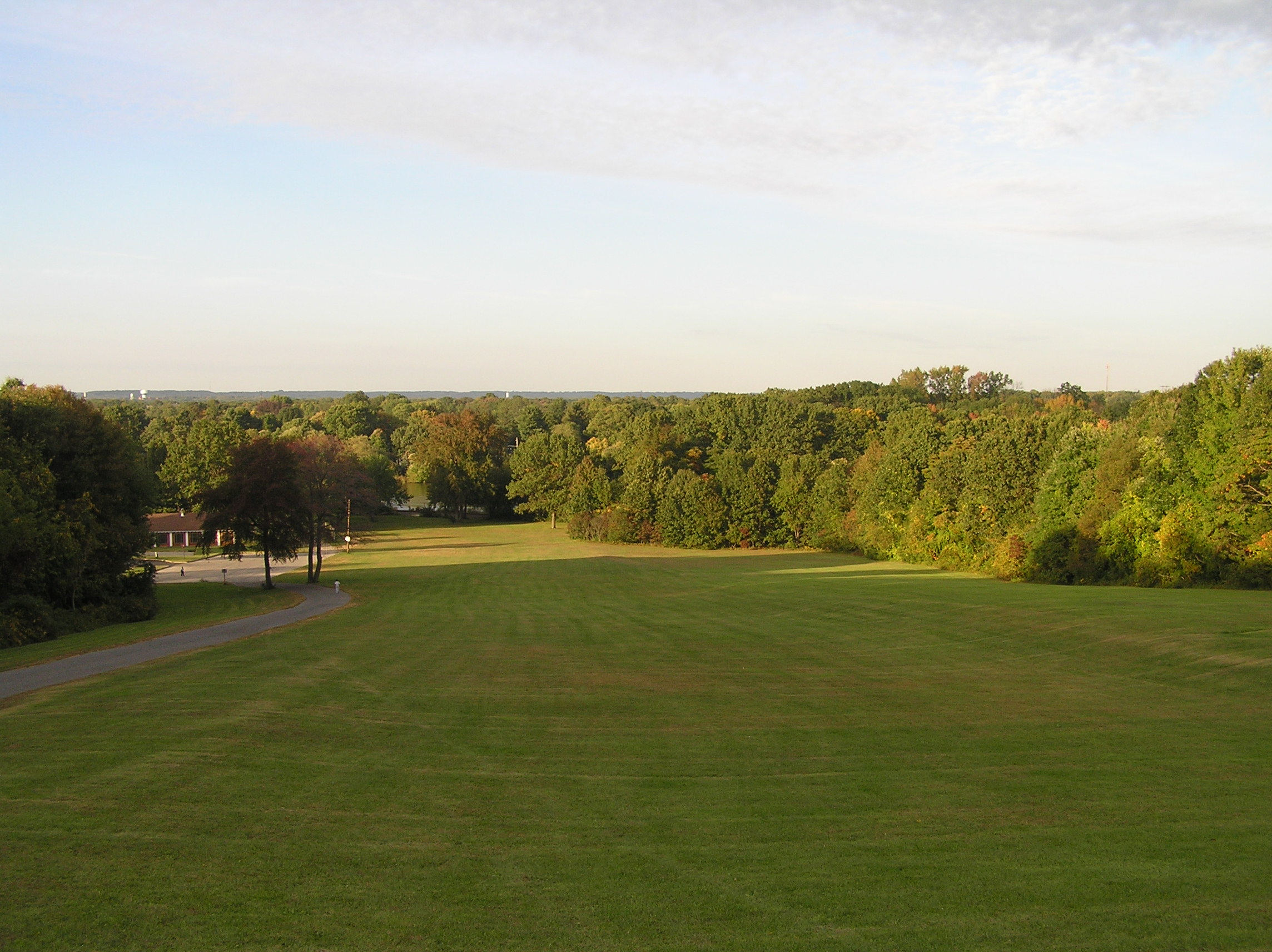
Thompson Park in Monroe Township

- Donaldson Park
- Carteret Park
- Carteret Waterfront Park
- Edison Park
- Fords Park
- Johnson Park
- Medwick Park
- Merrill Park
- Raritan Bay Waterfront Park
- Roosevelt Park
- Spring Lake Park
- Thompson Park
- Warren Park
- Old Bridge Waterfront Walkway
- Alvin P. Williams Memorial Park
- Ambrose & Doty's Brooks Park
- Davidson's Mill Pond Park
- Ireland Brook Park
- Jamesburg Park Conservation Area
- John A. Phillips Open Space Preserve
- John A. Phillips Park
- Catherine Von Ohlen Park

== See also ==
- Little India (Middlesex County, New Jersey)
- National Register of Historic Places listings in Middlesex County, New Jersey
