= Jugtown Historic District =

Historic district in New Jersey, United States

- U.S. National Register of Historic Places
- U.S. Historic district
- New Jersey Register of Historic Places
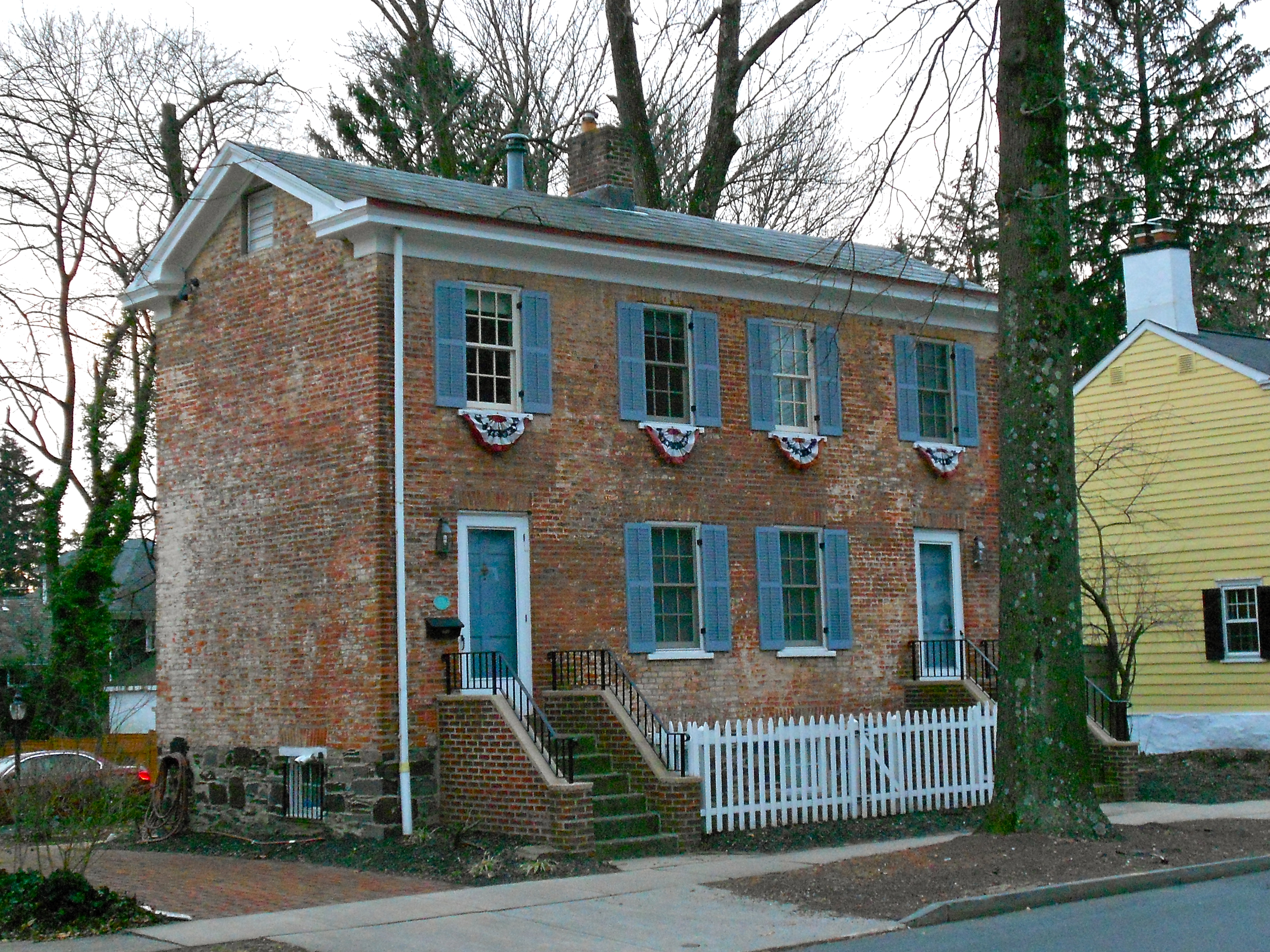

- Location within Mercer County, New Jersey Location within New Jersey Location within the United States
- Location: Portions of Nassau and Harrison streets; Evelyn Place
- Coordinates: 40°21′14″N 74°38′44″W
- Area: 15 acres (6.1 ha)
- Built: 18th century – c. 1918
- Architect: Multiple
- Architectural style: Queen Anne, Shingle Style
- NRHP reference No.: 86003670
- NJRHP No.: 1737

Significant dates
- Added to NRHP: January 22, 1987
- Designated NJRHP: December 16, 1986

The Jugtown Historic District consists of a cluster of historic buildings surrounding the intersection of Harrison Street and Nassau Street in Princeton, New Jersey, United States. The settlement dates to colonial times and is sometimes known as Queenston. In 1987, the district was listed on the National Register of Historic Places.

The Jugtown area was first settled by Europeans around 1730, springing up around a crossroads on the King's Highway. John Morton established the first pottery in the village in 1766. The 19th century saw the community grow, spurred by commercial development and trade on the Delaware and Raritan Canal. The latter half of the century saw the decline of Jugtown's industry. It was home to the short-lived Evelyn College for Women from 1887 to 1897. The district's character became mostly residential in the 20th century. Although the historic district was established in the 1980s, concerns over further development have arisen due to municipal zoning overlays.

== Etymology ==
The name Jugtown likely originated from the pottery produced in the village in the late 18th century. The name was used colloquially, mostly in the 18th and 19th centuries, and is first recorded on a 1789 map. The name Queenston, sometimes rendered as Queenstown, originated as one of a series of other royally-named settlements along the King's Highway, alongside Princeton Village, Kingston, and Princessville. The name was first used in the late 18th century as a more respectable alternative to "Jugtown". Although the names are used interchangeably, the community is today more commonly known as Jugtown than Queenston. The surviving streets of Queenston Lane and Queenston Common preserve the latter name.

== History ==
=== Initial settlement (1695–1766) ===
The path of Nassau Street was predated by the Assunpink Trail, a Lenape hunting route. A Quaker named John Horner, also rendered Hornor, was the first European to settle what is now Jugtown, purchasing 500 acres (200 ha) along the King's Highway, now Nassau Street, in 1695. In 1702, Horner expanded his holdings to all of the land comprising the modern historic district through the purchase of 200 acres (81 ha) to the east of his tract. The boundary between Horner's initial tract and the 1702 expansion later developed into a road, now Harrison Street, leading south to Josiah Davison's mill on the Millstone River.

Around the mid-18th century, the crossroads began developing into a village. A beam in the basement of 342 Nassau Street inscribed with the year 1730 dates the earliest still-extant building in the community. Nearby clay pits south and west of what is now Nassau Street contributed to the growth of the community, and allowed Horner to contribute to the construction of Nassau Hall in the 1750s. Stone for Nassau Hall may have been provided by a local quarry. Around 1755, the Red Farm House was built on what is now Ewing Street. Joseph Horner, John's grandson, possibly used bricks from a local clay pit to build the Joseph Horner House at 344 Nassau Street around the 1760s, but the house's lower story may date to earlier. During this same period, the two-story house at 341 Nassau Street was also constructed at the crossroads, as was a brick general store operated by local farmer and Princeton postmaster John Harrison. 306 Nassau Street was constructed by someone named Vandeveer around 1760.

=== Pottery hub (1766–1887) ===
In 1766, a potter named John Morton, from Wrightstown, Pennsylvania, bought a lot from Horner and established a pottery southwest of the crossroads. By 1789, production of jugs in the village was substantial enough to give the community its name. Both British and Patriot soldiers were housed in the village during the American Revolutionary War, as were delegates to the Continental Congress in 1783. Like much of modern Princeton, slavery existed in Jugtown in the late 18th and early 19th centuries. A stop on the Underground Railroad existed in the village, with an underground tunnel used to help fugitive slaves escape. The tunnel was located under Nassau Street connecting the Horner house to the home owned by Esther Johnson.

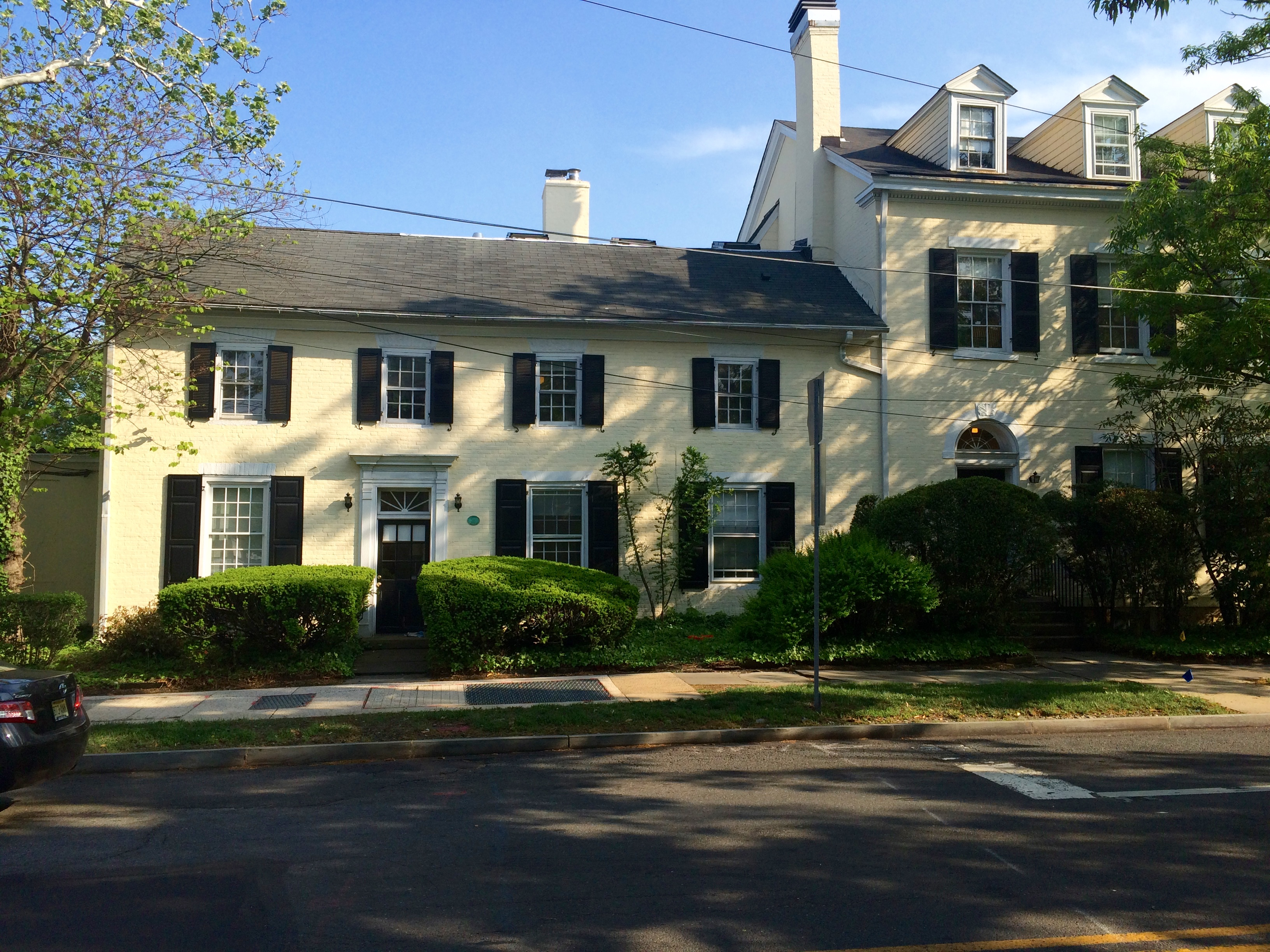
John C. Schenk operated a general store at 341 Nassau Street.

The early 19th century saw the first accounts of new commercial activity in Jugtown. By 1803, a brickyard and pipe factory was being operated by Stephen Scales. Around this time, Jacob Ineka had opened a second pottery south of Nassau Street, with the original pottery possibly having been shut down. Jugtown produced stone and clay jugs, with one of the village's potters known to have been African-American. Jugtown, previously divided between the townships of West Windsor and Montgomery, became part of Princeton Borough in 1813, though it retained an independent identity. Trade on the Delaware and Raritan Canal led to a period of economic prosperity that contributed to Jugtown's growth in the 1830s. A hotel existed in the community by the end of the decade.

A Presbyterian Chapel seating about 200 that later served as a school was built on a Harrison Street lot donated in 1832 by John C. Schenk, who operated a second general store at 341 Nassau Street. The Queenston Chapel, as it was named, housed the first Sunday school of its time in the state, and was taught at one point by future College of New Jersey president John Maclean. A tavern existed at 343–345 from about 1830, with the building housing a general store from the mid-1840s. Silkworms were raised in the village in the mid-1830s. In the mid-19th century, the village also traded in pork, produce, and hay. Other historical establishments included an ice company, carriage shop, two barbers, a paint store, bakery, cooperage, and blacksmith. An 1852 map shows the south side of Nassau Street densely lined with houses.

Around mid-century, growing ceramics competition from Trenton caused many of Jugtown's potteries to close. In the late 19th century, Jugtown expanded southwards to encompass the space up to Prospect Street. During this period, Jugtown's industry slowly disappeared, although it retained a residential and commercial character. Princeton Fire Engine Company No. 1 operated in a Nassau Street building in Jugtown until about 1880, at which time the prominent local Margerum family adapted the building, as well as a few others, into houses. Stephen Margerum also owned an ice company on the Millstone River and an argillite quarry on what is now the east side of North Harrison Street.

Jugtown had a musical tradition in the 1880s with the creation of the Jugtown Brass Band and the Jugtown Fife and Drum Corps to participate in the 1880 and 1884 presidential campaigns. Local lore holds that the Brass Band was hired to play at the funeral of Ulysses S. Grant, but instead drank and fought with police.

=== Assimilation into Princeton (1881–1945) ===
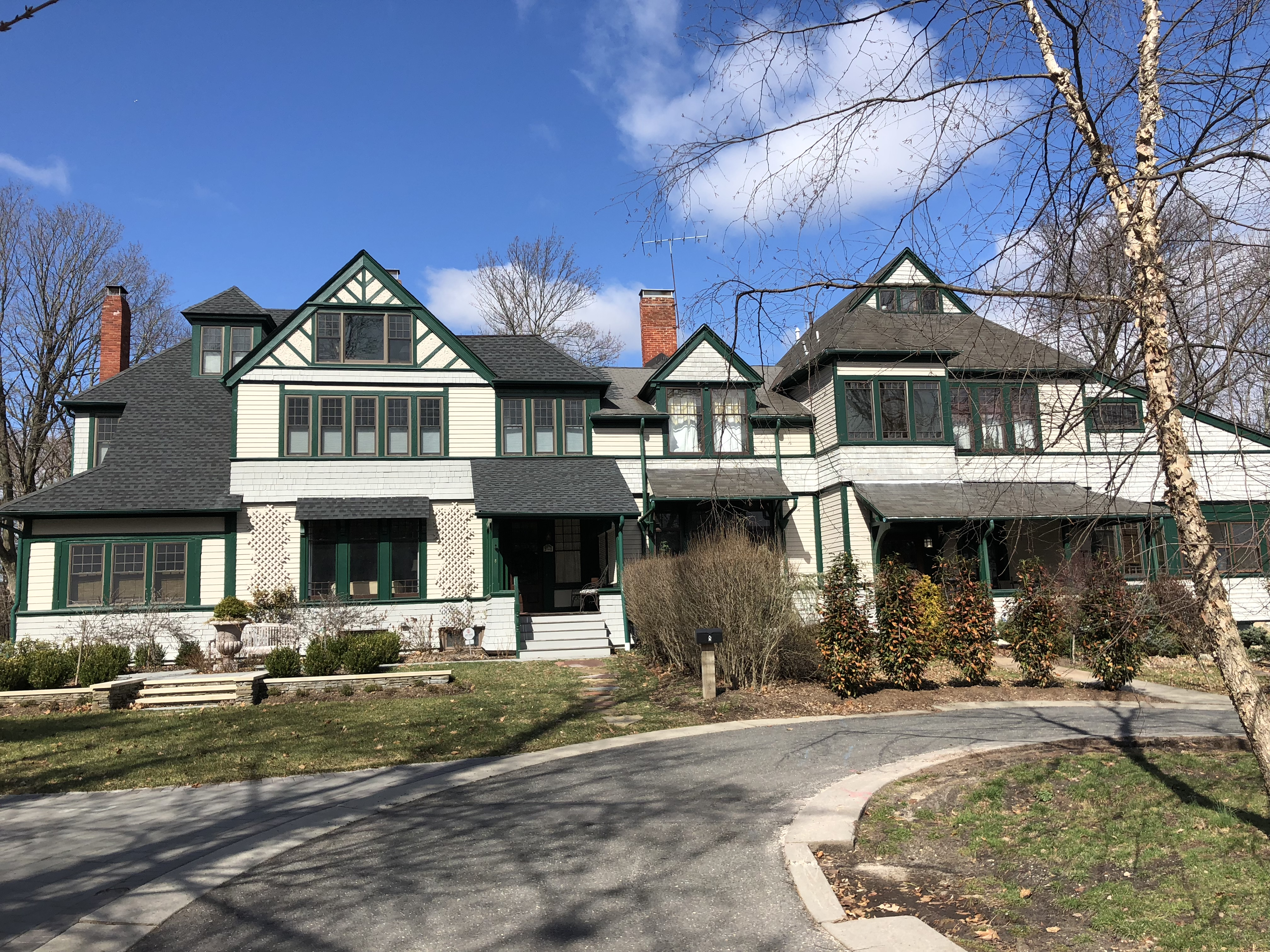
The Pines housed Evelyn College for Women from 1887 to 1897.

In 1881, ornithology professor William E. D. Scott built a large house on Nassau Street, which he called "the Pines". In 1887, Dr. Joshua Hall McIlvaine, with the support of Princeton faculty such as future president Francis Landey Patton, petitioned to establish a women's college in Princeton, to be housed in the Pines. The college, named Evelyn College after diarist John Evelyn, opened in September of that year, as a coordinate college to what is now Princeton University. In December 1889, Evelyn College received a charter from the state, as well as shared access to Princeton University's libraries and museums. Notable Princeton professors such as Allan Marquand and Woodrow Wilson taught at Evelyn. From 1888, the college rented out 341 Nassau, renaming it Queens Court and operating it as a girl's preparatory school. Evelyn, initially self-supporting, began to struggle with the Panic of 1893. McIlvaine's death, as well as the absence of an endowment and substantial support from Princeton trustees also spelled trouble for the school. Debt forced the school to close in 1897.

As the residential character of Princeton grew in the 20th century, many of Jugtown's larger properties were divided. The community's last quarries closed no earlier than 1906. Throughout the early century, Jugtown's independent identity was subsumed into Princeton's. Many Nassau Street properties were moved there from Prospect Street, creating an unbroken chain of residencies from Princeton's downtown. Further residential streets, such as Sergeant and Pelham Streets, opened before the 1920s, while Markham and Wilton Streets were opened during the decade itself. A total of 135 Jugtown residents fought in World War II.

== Preservation ==
=== Scope and significance ===
The work to establish a historic district in Jugtown began in 1980. The form for the National Register of Historic Places was prepared by Robert Craig on behalf of the Princeton Joint Historic Sites Commission in 1982. Princeton Borough first established a local Jugtown Historic District in 1986. The proposal submitted to the New Jersey and National Register of Historic Places consists of 23 houses representing the core of pre-1900 Jugtown, which initially disappointed the community due to its smaller size. The district, slightly more expansive than the original Princeton Borough district, has a western border at 298 Nassau Street and extends across the north side of the street to one lot east of North Harrison Street. 319 Nassau is the western boundary on the south side of Nassau Street. The district extends partially along Harrison Street. Harrison Street Park, a former site of a pottery, is included due to its archaeological potential. Seven of the district's houses at least partially date to the 18th century, with six from the early 19th century and five from the early 20th. The district has six key properties and thirteen contributing ones. The remaining non-contributing properties were included because of their concealment or architectural congruency with the rest of the district. The district's commercial and architectural significances were listed as contributing factors. The architectural character of Jugtown ranges from Federal to Colonial Revival and Queen Anne styles.

=== Development concerns ===
In 2020, the municipality of Princeton passed ordinances to provide for affordable housing zoning overlays. One such overlay overlapped five historic Jugtown structures, including the Horner House at 344 Nassau Street. Concerns arose in 2023 over a project that would add a four-story apartment building behind the Horner house at 344 Nassau Street. In 2024, the house was named one of the top ten most endangered historic sites in the state by the organization Preservation New Jersey. Residents formed the group Save Jugtown, claiming that the addition would visually overwhelm the historic center of the district.

== List of contributing properties ==
Address/Name	Year built	Style	No. of stories	Notes
1 Evelyn Place	c. 1908	Colonial Revival	2.5 (with basement)	
3 Evelyn Place	1908-1909	Colonial Revival	1.5 (with basement)	Built for Professor James Oscar Boyd.
7-8 Evelyn Place (Evelyn College/Red House)	1881	Shingle Style/Queen Anne	2.5	Formerly one house, split in two by professors who bought it in 1902. Originally built for W.E.D. Scott, used from 1887 to 1897 as Evelyn College.
298 Nassau Street	1830s	Federal/Greek Revival	2 in main section with a 3-story addition.	Formerly thought to date from 18th century.
301 Nassau Street	c. 1890s	Colonial Revival	2.5, as well as 2-story wings.	Moved from Prospect Avenue prior to 1923, formerly used as an eating club.
302 Nassau Street	c. 1880-1890	Shingle Style	2.5 (with basement)	Formerly had a six-pillar portico that has since been replaced. May have been owned by Theodosia Prevost, former wife of vice president Aaron Burr, in the 1830s.
306 Nassau Street	Late 18th century	Georgian	3 (originally 2.5)	Among the earliest brick houses in Princeton, with a 19th-century portico. Former home of Gerard van Polanen, Minister Resident of the Netherlands to the United States (1796–1802). The Colonial Club rented the house as their first meeting place.
319-321 Nassau Street	c. 1840s for left section, c. 1911–1918 for right section	Greek Revival (left section) and Colonial Revival (right section)	2	
325 Nassau Street	Before 1760	Georgian	2 (with basement)	Building's date uncertain, but has been suggested as 18th century due to its form, although it does not use Flemish bond masonry, common until around 1840. Builder is unknown.
239 Nassau Street	1840s	Vernacular/Greek Revival	2 (with basement)	
338/5 Nassau Street	c. 1810-1830	Vernacular/Federal	2 for main portion, 1.5 in rear (with basement)	
341 Nassau Street (John Schenk House/Queen's Court)	c. 1800-1810	Federal	2.5 (with basement) in main section, 2 in wing.	Formerly store owned by Schenk until 1836, and later used as preparatory school for future Evelyn College students.
342 Nassau Street	c. 1730	Vernacular Georgian	2.5 (with basement)	Contains a basement beam with inscription reading 1730, a date corroborated by its "verticality and lack of ornament." On original Jugtown crossroads.
344 Nassau Street	See notes	Vernacular/Colonial/Federal	2 (with basement)	The oldest surviving section of the house is likely the lower story of the wing, which may date from c. 1700. The current main section of the house has been dated to 1824, although this date may reflect an alteration of the current structure, which could originally date back to c. 1760. There are 18th- and 19th-century additions. The Horner family, who originally owned the land that became Jugtown, lived in the house until the 1840s.

== See also ==
- National Register of Historic Places listings in Mercer County, New Jersey
