= Bruce Harris (politician) =

American lawyer and politician

Mayor of Chatham Borough, New Jersey
- In office January 2012 – December 2019
- Preceded by: Nelson Vaughan
- Succeeded by: Thaddeus Kobylarz

Personal details
- Party: Republican
- Domestic partner: Marc Boisclair
- Profession: Lawyer

Bruce A. Harris is an American lawyer and politician from New Jersey. A Republican, he previously served as Mayor of Chatham Borough, New Jersey from January 2012 to December 2019. Prior to that, he served on the Chatham Borough Council from 2004 to 2012. Since leaving office, Harris was appointed to the New Jersey State Planning Commission, which he has been a member of since February 2020.

== Biography ==
Harris attended Amherst College, graduating magna cum laude. He earned an MBA from the Boston University Graduate School of Management and a JD from Yale Law School.

After eight years on the Chatham Borough Council, Harris ran for mayor of Chatham Borough in November 2011, defeating Democratic incumbent Nelson Vaughan. A Republican, Harris took office as mayor in January 2012.

On January 23, 2012, Governor Chris Christie nominated Harris to an open seat on the New Jersey Supreme Court. His nomination was rejected on May 31, 2012, by the Senate Judiciary Committee in a 7–6 vote that was largely along party lines. His lack of courtroom experience was cited by the opposition. Harris is openly gay. If his nomination had been confirmed, he would have been the first openly gay New Jersey Supreme Court justice.

Harris served as general counsel of the New Jersey Turnpike Authority from 2012 to 2018.

In April 2019, Harris announced that he would not seek re-election as mayor of Chatham Borough. He was replaced by Democrat Thaddeus "Thad" Kobylarz, who had been on the borough council before running for mayor. In February 2020, Democratic Governor Phil Murphy appointed the Republican Harris to the New Jersey State Planning Commission.
