= Kingston Village Historic District =

Kingston Village Historic District may refer to:

- Kingston Village Historic District (Kingston, New Jersey), listed on the National Register of Historic Places in Middlesex County, New Jersey and listed in Somerset County, New Jersey
- Kingston Village Historic District (Kingston, Rhode Island), listed on the National Register of Historic Places in Washington County, Rhode Island
