= King's Highway Historic District =

King's Highway Historic District may refer to:

- King's Highway Historic District (New Jersey), listed on the National Register of Historic Places in Mercer, Middlesex, and Somerset Counties, New Jersey
- King's Highway Historic District (Dallas, Texas), listed on the National Register of Historic Places in Dallas County, Texas
- Old King's Highway Historic District, listed on the National Register of Historic Places listings in Barnstable County, Massachusetts
