= Assunpink =

Assunpink (Ahsën'pink) in the Algonquian language means "stony, watery place."

Assunpink may refer to the following in the U.S. state of New Jersey:

- Assunpink Creek, a tributary of the Delaware River
- Assunpink Trail, a Native American trail
- Battle of the Assunpink Creek, a battle of the American Revolutionary War
