= King's Highway Historic District (New Jersey) =

Historic district in New Jersey, United States

- U.S. National Register of Historic Places
- U.S. Historic district
- New Jersey Register of Historic Places
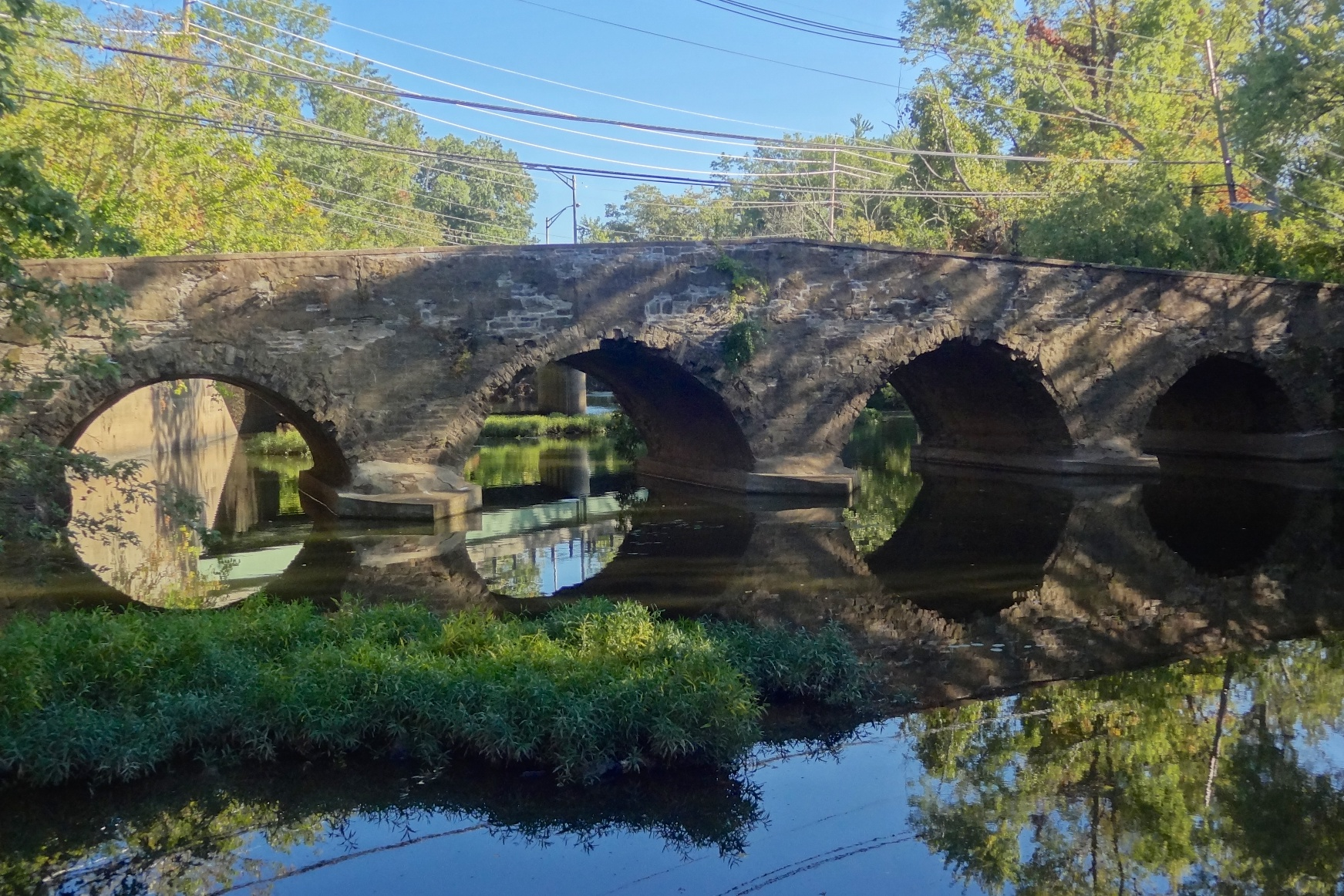
- The Kingston Bridge built 1798 to replace one destroyed by George Washington's troops to prevent British pursuit after the Battle of Princeton

- Location within Mercer County, New Jersey Location within New Jersey Location within the United States
- Location: U.S. Route 206 from mile marker 48.3 to 53.9 and Route 27 from mile marker 0.0 to 4.1
- Coordinates: 40°20′53.8″N 74°39′52.0″W
- Area: 81 acres (33 ha)
- Built: 1660–1950
- Architect: Multiple
- NRHP reference No.: 00001493
- NJRHP No.: 353

Significant dates
- Added to NRHP: December 21, 2000
- Designated NJRHP: October 23, 2000

The King's Highway Historic District covers the portions of U.S. Route 206 and Route 27 in New Jersey that connect Lawrenceville (in Lawrence Township) with Kingston (in Franklin Township / South Brunswick) through Princeton. The roadway dates to colonial times and was a portion of the King's Highway that was laid out by order of Charles II of England to connect Boston with Charleston. It is lined with many institutions and sites that have played an important role in the History of the United States, including Princeton University and the Princeton Theological Seminary.

Along the road can be found five National Historic Landmarks: the Lawrenceville School, Morven, Maclean House, Nassau Hall, and the Joseph Henry House. The highway also runs through eight historic districts, from west to east, Lawrence Township Historic District, Princeton Battlefield / Stony Brook Village Historic District, Princeton Historic District, Jugtown Historic District, Kingston Mill Historic District, Lake Carnegie Historic District, Delaware and Raritan Canal Historic District and the Kingston Village Historic District. The governor's mansion of New Jersey, Drumthwacket, independently listed on the National Register of Historic Places, is found on the road in the western part of Princeton. The district was added to the National Register of Historic Places on December 21, 2000, for its significance in commerce, exploration, settlement, military, politics, government and transportation from 1660 to 1950. The highway itself is the only contributing structure.

== Gallery ==
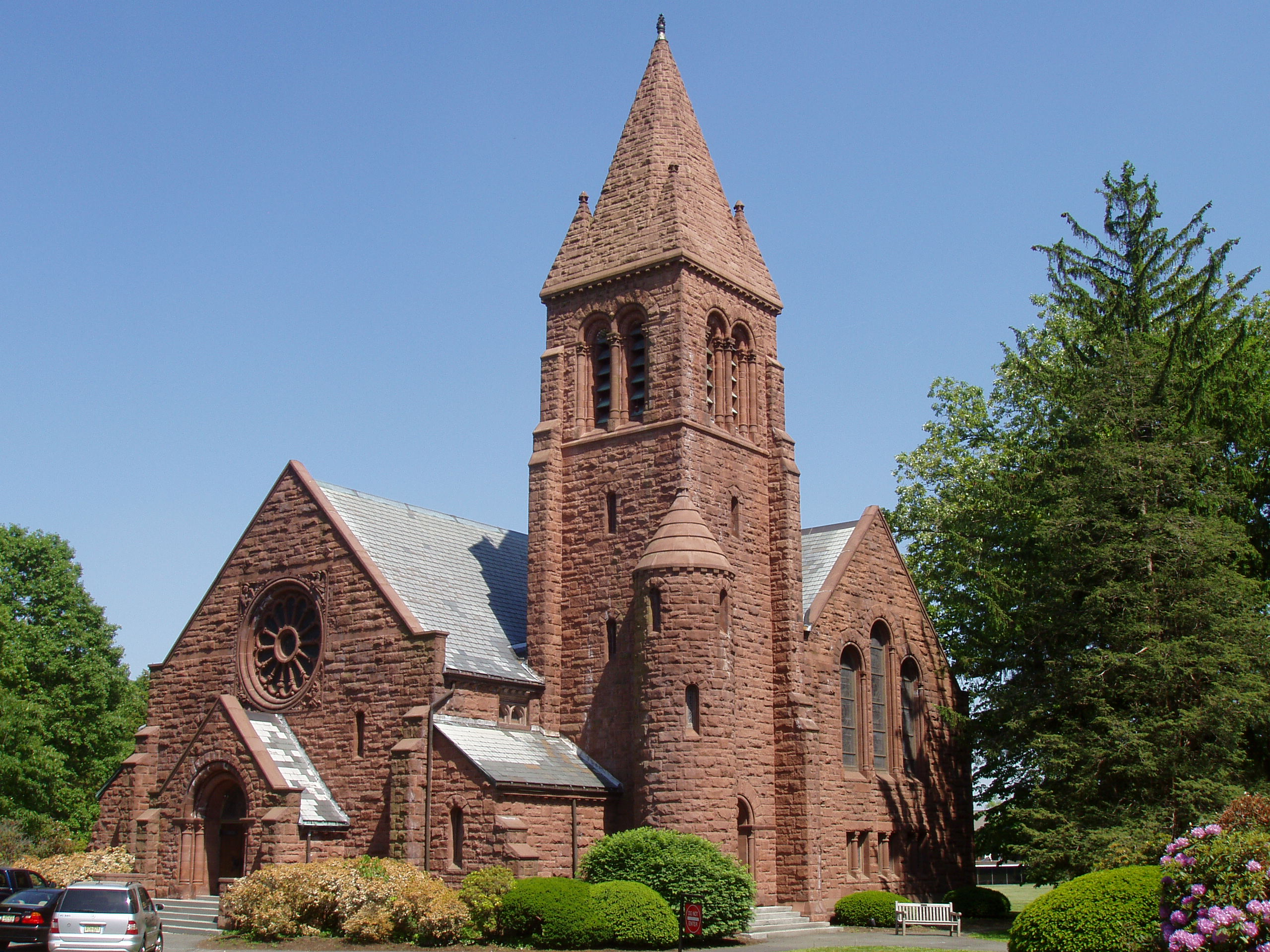
Edith Memorial Chapel at the Lawrenceville School

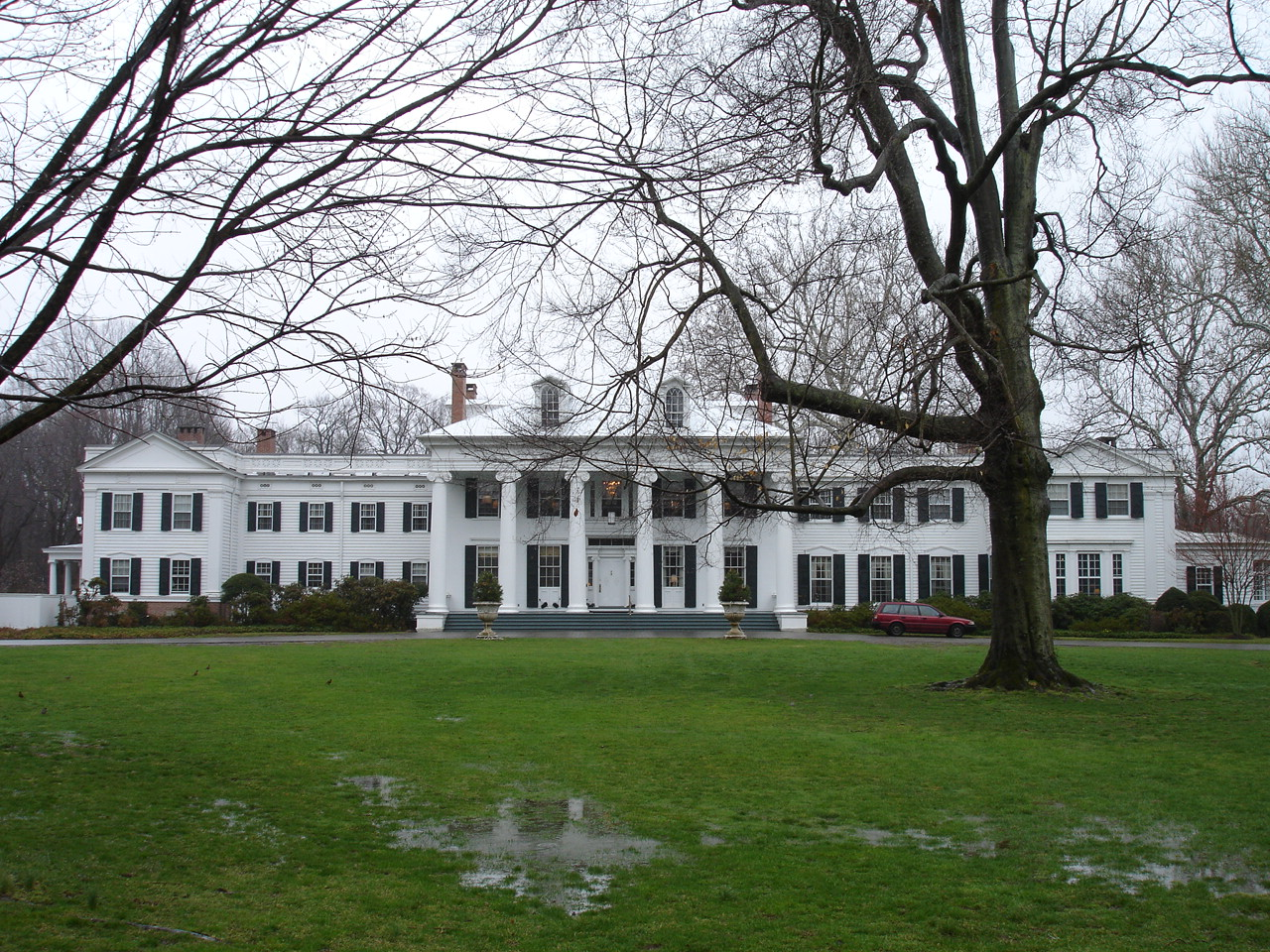
Drumthwacket, the governor's mansion of New Jersey

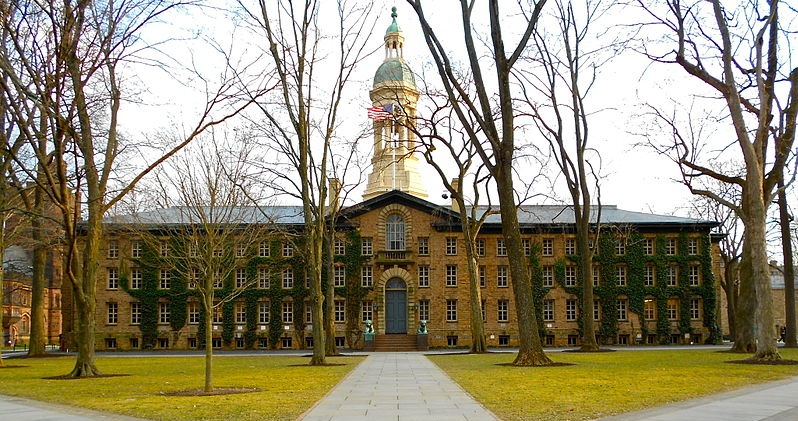
Nassau Hall, the original building of Princeton University and capital of the United States in the summer of 1783

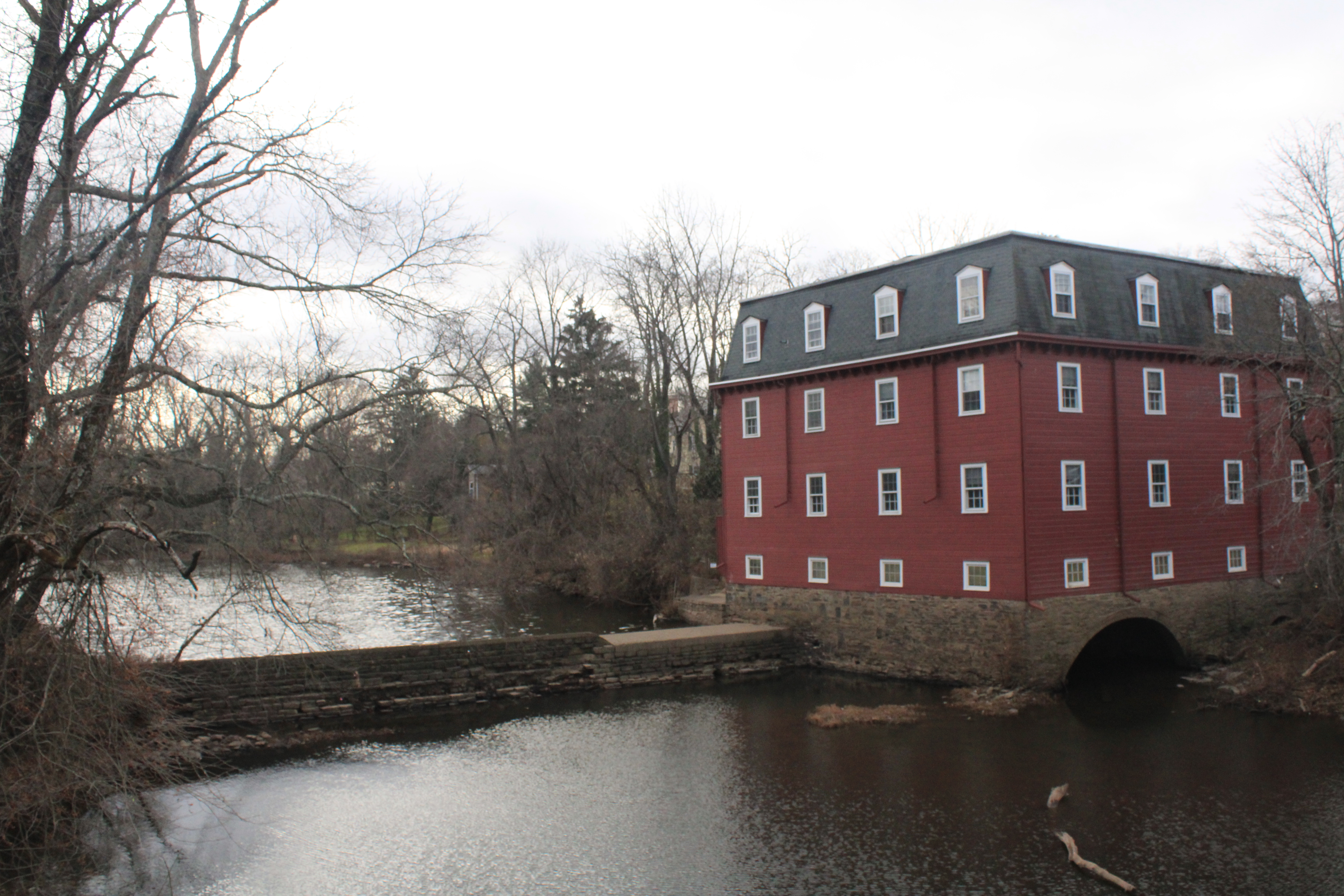
The Kingston Mill with Lake Carnegie

== See also ==
- Assunpink Trail
- National Register of Historic Places listings in Mercer County, New Jersey
- National Register of Historic Places listings in Middlesex County, New Jersey
- National Register of Historic Places listings in Somerset County, New Jersey
