= Kingston Mill Historic District =

Historic district in New Jersey, United States

- U.S. National Register of Historic Places
- U.S. Historic district
- New Jersey Register of Historic Places
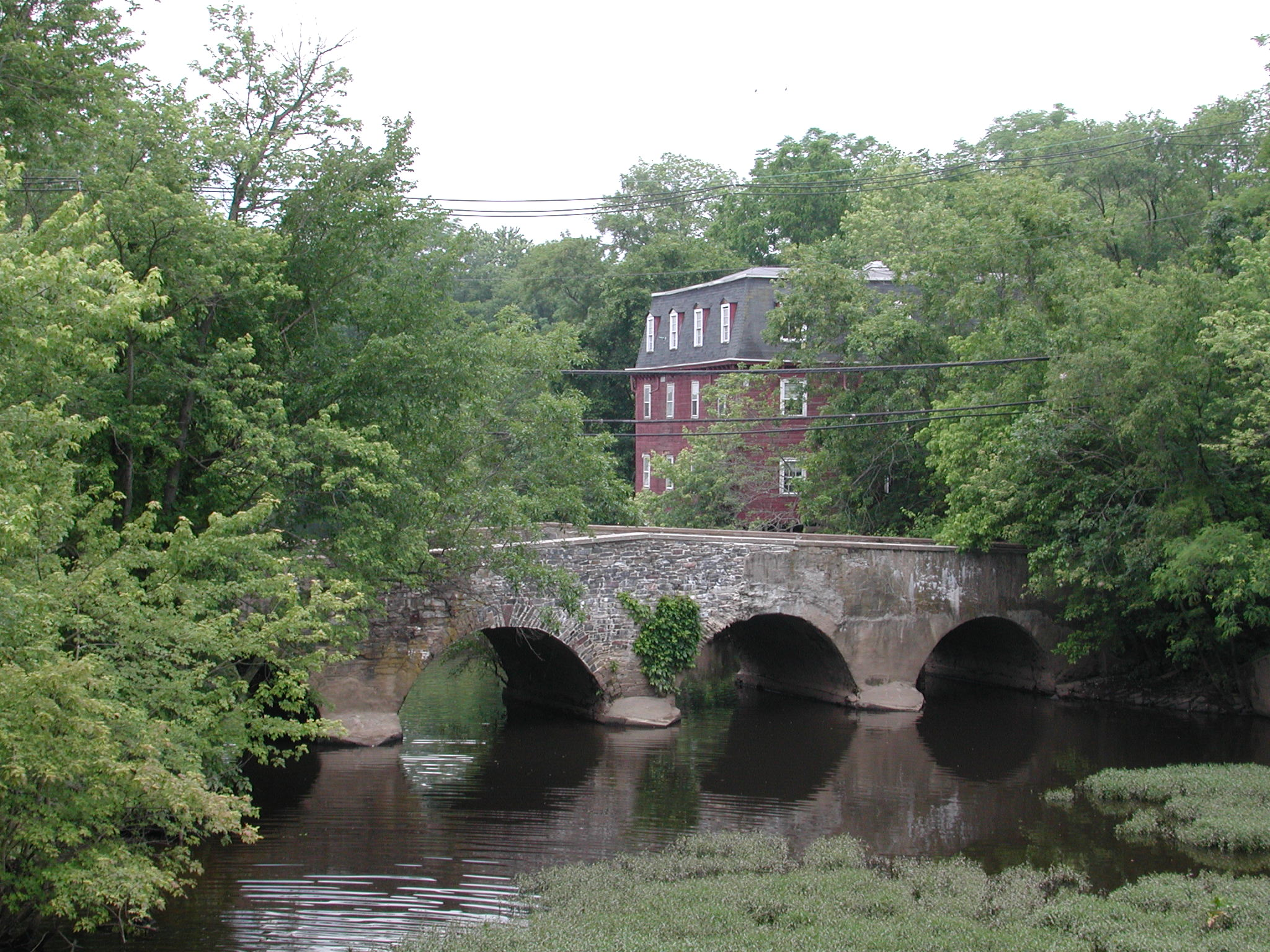
- The Kingston Mill with the 1798 bridge over the Millstone River in the foreground

- Location within Mercer County, New Jersey Location within Middlesex County, New Jersey Location within Somerset County, New Jersey Location within New Jersey Location within the United States
- Location: Roughly bounded by Herrontown, River, and Princeton-Kingston Roads; Kingston, New Jersey
- Coordinates: 40°22′26″N 74°37′15″W
- Area: 49 acres (20 ha)
- Built: before 1748 (original mill), (Note: The date that the first mill on the property was built is uncertain. Craig states that the first mill was built in 1755 by Jacob Skillman. Greiff, however, states that one of Craig's sources, Old Princeton's Neighbors, confuses two different mills, while another, Millstone Valley by Elizabeth Menzies, incorrectly gives the date as 1755. Greiff instead suggests that a mill was likely in operation by the late 1740s and had been built by Brinson, citing a 1747 invoice from "Bearfoot Brunson" for "millage", a 1748 advertisement, and rental agreements from 1749 and 1750. Muser likewise claims the mill was likely built before 1748.) 1798 (bridge), 1888 (current mill)
- Architectural style: Vernacular, Federal, Colonial
- NRHP reference No.: 86000707
- NJRHP No.: 1746

Significant dates
- Added to NRHP: April 10, 1986
- Designated NJRHP: March 5, 1986

The Kingston Mill Historic District is a 49-acre (20 ha) historic district in Kingston, New Jersey. It consists of the historic Kingston Mill on the Millstone River and surrounding colonial and Federal-era structures, including several houses and an 18th-century stone bridge. It is notable for containing the home of Henry Greenland, likely the first European-built house in what is now Princeton, New Jersey. The district was added to the National Register of Historic Places in 1986 for its significance in engineering, exploration/settlement, industry, politics/government, and transportation. The district's territory is shared between Princeton, South Brunswick, and Franklin Township. (Note: Located in Mercer, Middlesex, and Somerset counties respectively.)

The area was first settled in 1683 when Henry Greenland established a tavern where a growing cart road met the Millstone River, likely building the first European settlement in the vicinity of what is now Princeton. Around the 1740s, Greenland's grandson Barefoot Brinson, sheriff of Middlesex and Somerset Counties, built the area's first gristmill and possibly housing for tenants on the property as the area became more settled and less remote. After Brinson's death, Jacob Skillman built a second mill on the property, as well as a house and shop.

After the mill was burned during the American Revolutionary War, it was rebuilt in 1797 by stagecoach owner John Gulick Jr, who expanded the property's buildings and improved the adjacent road into a turnpike. The mill was expanded by the Gulicks and later owners throughout the 19th century, and was rebuilt again by Nelson Thompson following a fire in 1888. The mill shut down in the 20th century, while the surrounding farm remained property of the Gulicks. The district was nominated in 1982 and designated in 1986.

== History ==
=== Initial settlement (1683–1695) ===
For most of the 17th century, European settlements in New Jersey were small, and the area between the Delaware and Raritan rivers was considered a wilderness. What is today Princeton-Kingston Road, which crosses through the district, was long believed to have originally been a trail used by the indigenous Lenape people, later labelled the Assunpink Trail, although the truth of this theory is uncertain. There is, however, evidence that a path known to both Lenape and early colonists existed. Most European travel along the trail was rare and on foot, especially during the period of Dutch colonization. By the 1670s, Europeans may have begun marking the trail, but the area of central New Jersey remained devoid of colonial settlement. By the 1680s, the inconvenience of ocean travel between Philadelphia and New York prompted English colonial authorities to widen the trail into a cart road, which became substantially more frequently travelled.

In 1683, Henry Greenland, a tavern keeper in Piscataway, was offered 400 acres of land to build a tavern at the intersection of the trail and the Millstone River by Gawen Lawrie, the deputy-governor of what at the time was the Province of East Jersey. (Note: From 1674 to 1702, British possessions in what is now New Jersey were split between the provinces of East Jersey and West Jersey.) Greenland was a well-educated former resident of both Massachusetts and what is now Maine who had settled in Piscataway in 1679. Greenland, who had been expelled from his community in Maine, was well known for starting fights and generally being a troublemaking figure. In Massachusetts, he had been convicted of adultery and once escaped prison after a brawl. In East Jersey, his support for New York governor Edmund Andros' foiled 1680 attempt to exert control over the province saw Greenland disqualified from political office.

Greenland's tavern home, built on the Millstone's west bank the same year he was offered the land, was the first known European settlement to be built in the wilderness between East and West Jersey, as well as likely the first house built in what is today Princeton. That same year, the government of Piscataway ordered a footbridge to be built on the property. Four years after the tavern was built, representatives from both West and East Jersey met there on January 8, 1687 to negotiate a survey to establish the border between the two colonies. The land of many early settlers in the area, including Greenland, remained in dispute until the drawing of the subsequent Keith Line clarified the boundary. The tavern remained Greenland's home until he died in 1695, although it was purchased early in the decade by his son-in-law Daniel Brinson. Because Greenland lived in such a remote, wooded location, he had regular contact with the local Lenape; in 1685, he was accused and later acquitted of stealing pigs from them. He and his wife, Mary, also owned an enslaved indigenous girl.

=== Continued growth (1695–1797) ===
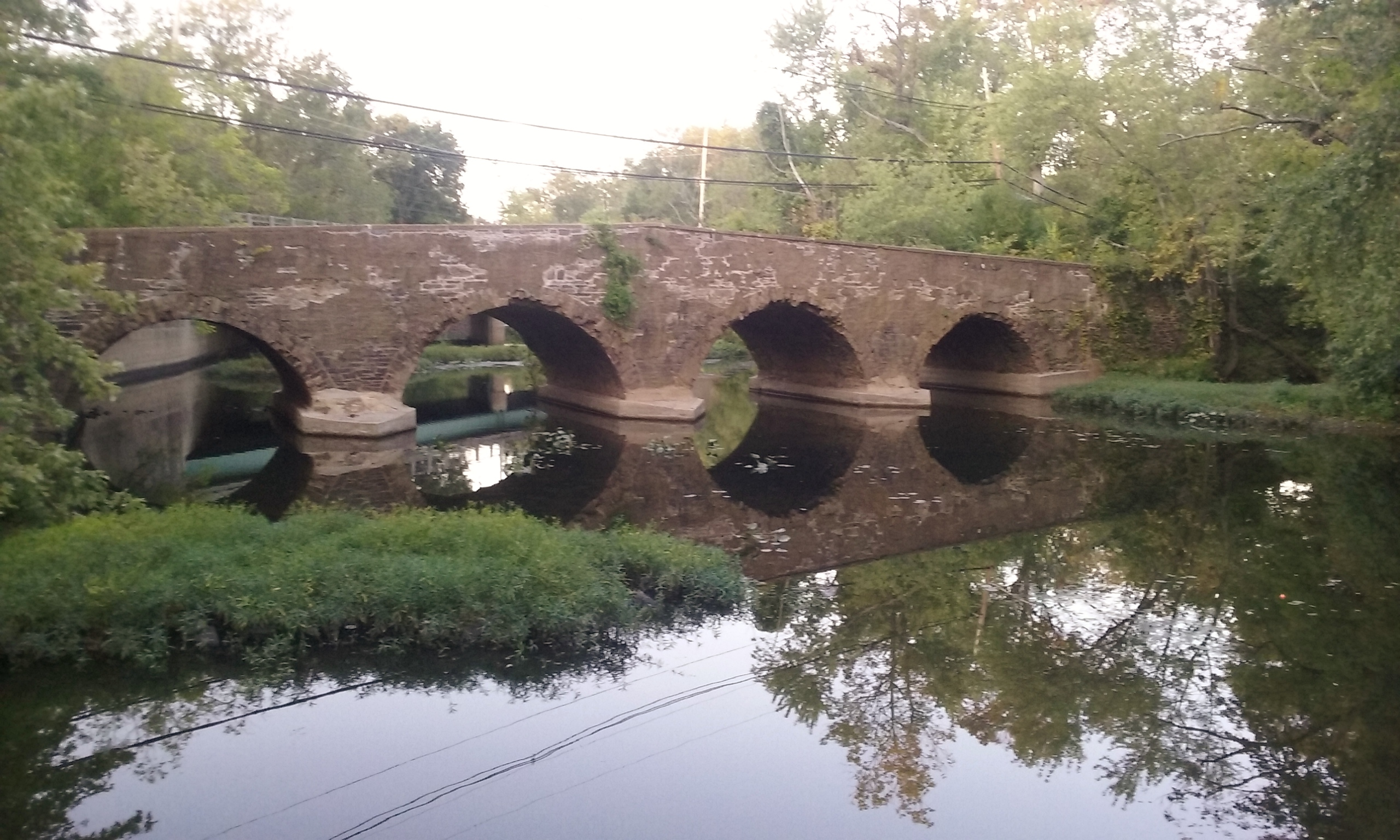
The current stone bridge over the Millstone River was built in 1798 to replace a wooden one dismantled in 1777 by American troops leaving the Battle of Princeton.

After Daniel Brinson's 1696 death and the remarriage of his wife Frances, the farm and tavern house passed to Brinson's ten year-old son Barefoot, named after a friend of Greenland's who had helped him escape prison. As an adult, Barefoot was involved in the politics of nearby Princeton as sheriff of Middlesex and Somerset counties, first appointed to both positions in 1709, and reappointed as Somerset County sheriff in 1742 after having been removed. He expanded his property in 1735, and through the 1740s, he built a number of structures on the farm, including a gristmill and possibly two structures for housing tenants.

Throughout the early 18th century, the area around the district became more frequented and settled as the adjacent village of Kingston grew into a stagecoach stop along the road, which had been chartered in 1697 as a King's Highway. In 1744, a path from the farm to what is now Mount Lucas Road was expanded into another public road. As Kingston's most prominent commercial establishment, the mill served as a social gathering place, where villagers conversed and exchanged goods.

In 1748, Barefoot Brinson died, leaving his property to be administered by his widow Mary and her brother Thomas Lawrence. Barefoot's son Samuel rented the mill from Lawrence in 1749, and agreed to repair it. In 1755, the property and the deteriorating houses and mill were purchased from Mary Brinson by Jacob Skillman, who erected a second gristmill and a sawmill along the Millstone, as well as a "new stone dwelling" with an adjoining shop around 1763. The mill's location on the water meant that its flour could easily be transported to New York City via the Raritan. A wooden bridge next to the mill allowed travelers to cross the Millstone.

In December 1776, during the American Revolutionary War, the British military burned Skillman's mill while occupying the area during the New Jersey campaign. The following month, after the Battle of Princeton, Captain Thomas Rodney of George Washington's force was dispatched to delay the British retreat by dismantling the wooden bridge over the Millstone with a team of carpenters. A new, more durable stone arch bridge was built to replace it in 1798, one of at least four built along the route that decade. It is the only extant stone bridge in Central New Jersey to have four arches.

=== Rebuilt mill (1797–present) ===
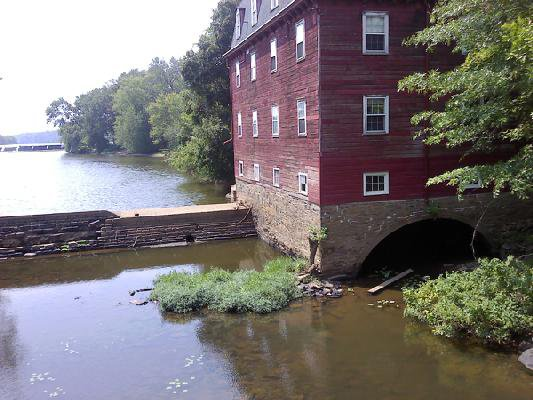
The rebuilt mill after the 1888 fire is the one that stands at the site today.

In 1797, Major John Gulick Jr., a prominent owner of a stagecoach line and veteran of the Revolutionary War and Whiskey Rebellion, bought the farm and site of the former mill, which he rebuilt with his brother Jacob. In the early 19th century, he also worked to develop several of the houses surrounding the mill. In 1807, Gulick improved part of the former King's Highway, now called the Old Post Road, into the Kingston and Princeton Branch Turnpike, as the road's importance had declined after the opening of the more convenient "straight turnpike," now Route One, three years prior. Gulick also aimed to give his stage line a competitive advantage by developing the road that ran by the property. By 1810, he had also added a new wing to the original Greenland house, expanded the house built by Skillman into a 5-bay Federal style home, and added a Federal style section to one of the tenant houses built around 1740, today known as the Gulick-Hodge-Scott House. Gulick probably hired the same builder for each of these additions. Under Gulick's ownership, the mill was particularly successful during the War of 1812.

The new mill incorporated a gristmill, sawmill and fulling mill, the latter two of which were sublet to a string of businessmen. John Gulick died in 1828, leaving the property to his sons, who continued operating the gristmill and leasing the other two. A shortage of local timber eventually caused the Gulicks to shut down the sawmill. In February 1844, William Gulick brought on Martin Vanderveer as a partner in the operation of the mill, having renovated it. During the mid-19th century, an additional 3-bay, 2.5-story house was built near the mill. Charles B. Robinson became the mill's owner in 1870, expanding it in 1885 with modern machinery. (Note: Robinson's name is also given as Robison and Robeson.) The adjacent farm, meanwhile, remained Gulick property, and at the time of the district's creation was used to pasture horses. A fire destroyed the mill building in February 1888. Nelson Thompson built the current mill structure to replace it. With the exception of one story, the mill was converted to steam power as it was rebuilt, with a small brick building added to contain its boiler. After Nelson Thompson's rebuilding, the mill was successively owned by John H. Rutherford, the Carnegie Foundation, Carlton Thompson, and Matthew Skydam Jr., Skydam keeping it in operation until the 1940s. By 1982, the second story and roof story were being used as apartments.

== Historic district ==
In 1982, the district was nominated for the New Jersey Register of Historic Places by architectural historian Robert Craig as part of an agreement to survey and nominate historic properties and districts in Princeton Township and Borough, at the time distinct municipalities. The Kingston Mill Historic District was added to the National Register of Historic Places on April 10, 1986. Although the nomination for the New Jersey Register initially included Kingston itself, it was dropped from the scope of the district after delays in producing the application. The NRHP district is part of a local, municipal historic district of Princeton, which forms a protective buffer around it. The stone bridge is also part of Delaware and Raritan Canal State Park.

When nominated, the 49-acre district was dominated by 40 acres of farmland owned by the Gulick family, and was noted as an "abrupt shift" visually from the suburban subdivisions to its southwest. The boundaries of the NRHP district were drawn to encompass surrounding areas "visually related" to and "clearly associated" with the Greenland house and Kingston Mill, including the Gulick farmland and the district's contributing properties. The district's border runs along Herrontown Road, then cuts towards Princeton-Kingston Road to exclude post-war suburbs. It then continues along the south side of Princeton-Kingston Road, cuts through another lot to follow the Millstone River north to the stone bridge, and then continues from the bridge to Route 27, which it then follows until it reaches River Road. It then follows River Road until it reaches the point where it begins. The boundary along the Millstone was drawn to encompass not only the mill but its mill dam, as well as to allow a buffer around the stone bridge to protect it from development. Although non-contributing properties, two small mid-20th century houses at the corner of Herrontown and River roads are contained within the district.

The district is noted as historically significant in multiple categories identified by the NRHP. Its association with Henry Greenland marks it as important in the field of exploration and settlement under criteria "a" and "b", while the stone bridge contributes to the district's significance under the engineering category under criterion "c". The district is also noted as significant in the fields of industry, transportation, and politics and government, the latter due to Barefoot Brinson's associations with local politics and Greenland's association with Edmund Andros and the agreement on the Keith Line. The nomination form notes the presence of the out-buildings on the Gulick farm as representing an "intact" farm group from the period and a small brick structure by the mill with a brick smokestack as representing the mill's transition to steam power. The form also notes the district's potential for archaeological research, noting in particular the likely presence of tavern deposits around the original Greenland house, the development of the Skillman-Forman-Gulick House, and the development of industry at the mill. The crossing of Route 27 over the Millstone is noted as a "funnel" for human activity, where artifacts and remains of earlier bridges and unrecorded structures may be foundn.

== List of contributing properties ==
Name/address	Year built	Style	No. of stories	Notes	Source
Greenland-Brinson-Gulick House (1082 Princeton-Kingston Road)	c. 1683 (original house), later construction in 18th and 19th centuries	Vernacular, Colonial, Federal, Victorian	2.5	Originally 1.5 stories. This was likely the first structure built by a European in what is now Princeton. It was originally owned by Henry Greenland and was the site of the meeting that commissioned a survey of the Keith Line between East and West Jersey. The western wing of the house was added by Barefoot Brinson in the mid-18th century. The east side's Federal style addition was added by John Gulick and was remodeled in Victorian style in the 19th century. The property also contains small, 19th-century out-buildings, including an ice house, summer house, smokehouse, two barns, and a schoolhouse built c. 1870 and moved to the property from Kingston.	
Skillman-Forman-Gulick House/"New Market" (1091 Princeton-Kingston Road)	c. 1763, with frame addition in early 19th century	Vernacular, Colonial, Federal	2.5	Advertised as "new stone dwelling" by Jacob Skillman in 1763. Local Presbyterian leader Ezekiel Forman bought the house and named it "New Market." He sold it to Lemuel Scudder in 1770, who sold it to John Gulick. Gulick likely was the one to add a wooden frame addition to the original stone structure. This house is an example of an embanked stone vernacular style common in western New Jersey, not found east of the Princeton area and possibly of German origin.	
Doctor Hendrickson House/"Millhouse" (1108 Princeton-Kingston Road )	1745	Vernacular, Colonial, Federal, Victorian	2.5	Early structure probably built by Barefoot Brinson. Home of a "Dr. Hendrickson" in 1766, later home of Sheriff Charles B. Robinson in late 19th century and Hugh L. Scott in early 20th century. This is also an example of the same vernacular embanked stone style as the Skillman-Forman-Gulick house.	
Kingston Mill (1113 Princeton-Kingston Road)	c. 1888 (current mill)	n/a	3 + raised basement	The original mill on this site began operating under Barefoot Brinson by 1748 and was burnt in 1776 by British troops. Rebuilt in 1797, it burnt down again in 1888, after which the current structure was built. Includes a small brick building with a ten-foot tall brick smokestack, built to contain the mill's boiler after 1888. The Millstone River is dammed by the mill.	
Kingston Bridge	1798	Stone arch	n/a	A four arched bridge, made of plaster over stone. It is 25 feet wide. Built by someone named "P. Dorn" to replace a wooden bridge dismantled by American troops in 1777. In use until 1963, when an adjacent bridge was built. Currently part of Delaware and Raritan Canal State Park.	
50 River Road	Early 19th century	Farmhouse with a Greek Revival porch	2.5	A one-room schoolhouse stood near this 19th century farmhouse until the late 20th century.	
Gulick-Hodge-Scott House (see Notes for address)	Mid 18th-century	Vernacular, Federal	2	Although advertised as new in 1769, this three-bay building incorporates a structure dating to 1740, possibly one of Barefoot Brinson's tenant houses. Between 1800 and 1820, a 2.5-story Federal style section in Flemish-bond brick was added to it. A 1-story section was added to the east end in the mid-20th century. It is currently a private residence. Craig 1982 gives the address as 117 Herrontown Road, while the Princeton Historical Society lists it as 7 Herrontown Road.	

== Gallery ==
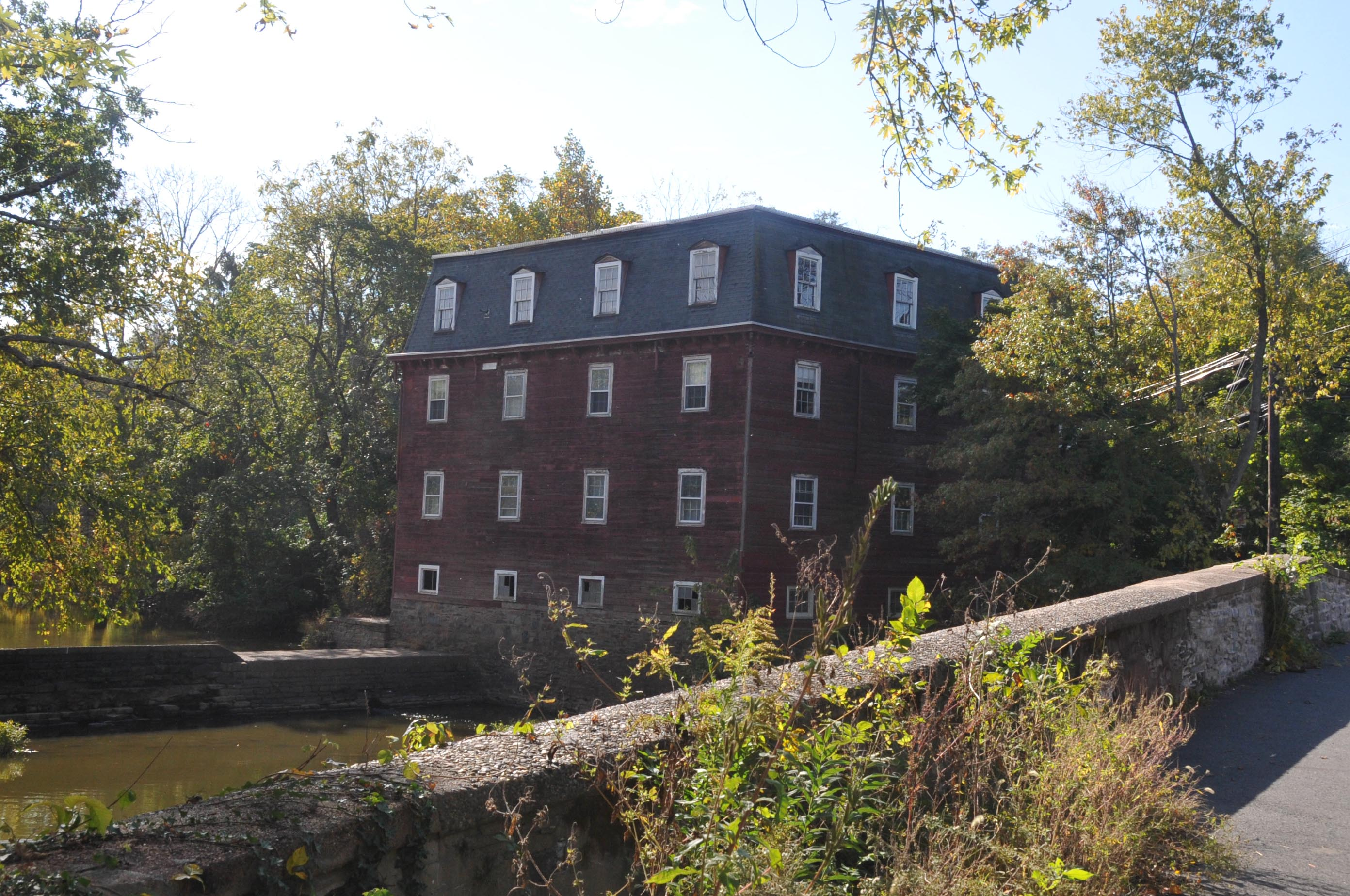
The Kingston Mill, the third mill on the site, built after the 1888 fire

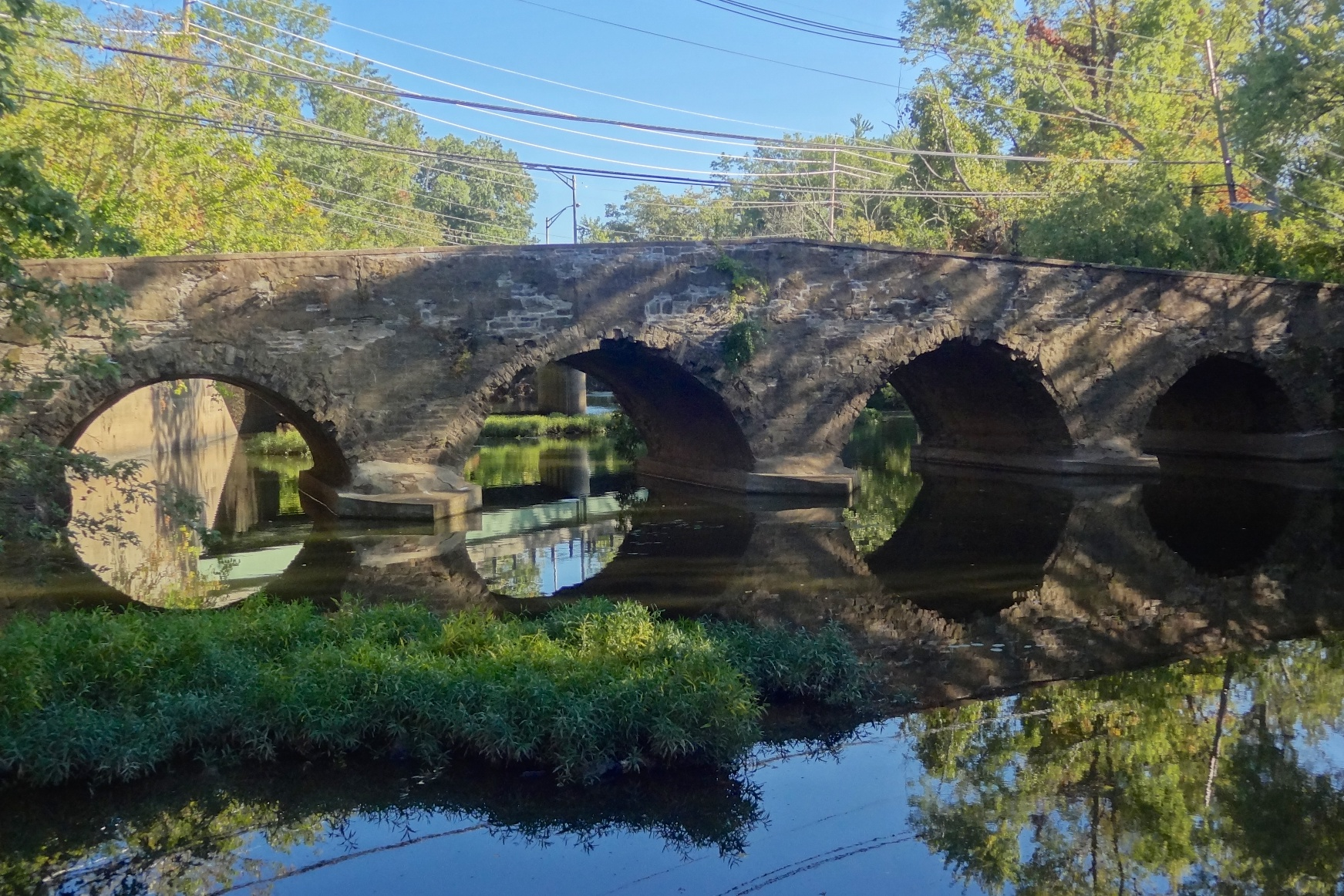
The Kingston Bridge (1798), built to replace one demolished by George Washington's troops to prevent British pursuit

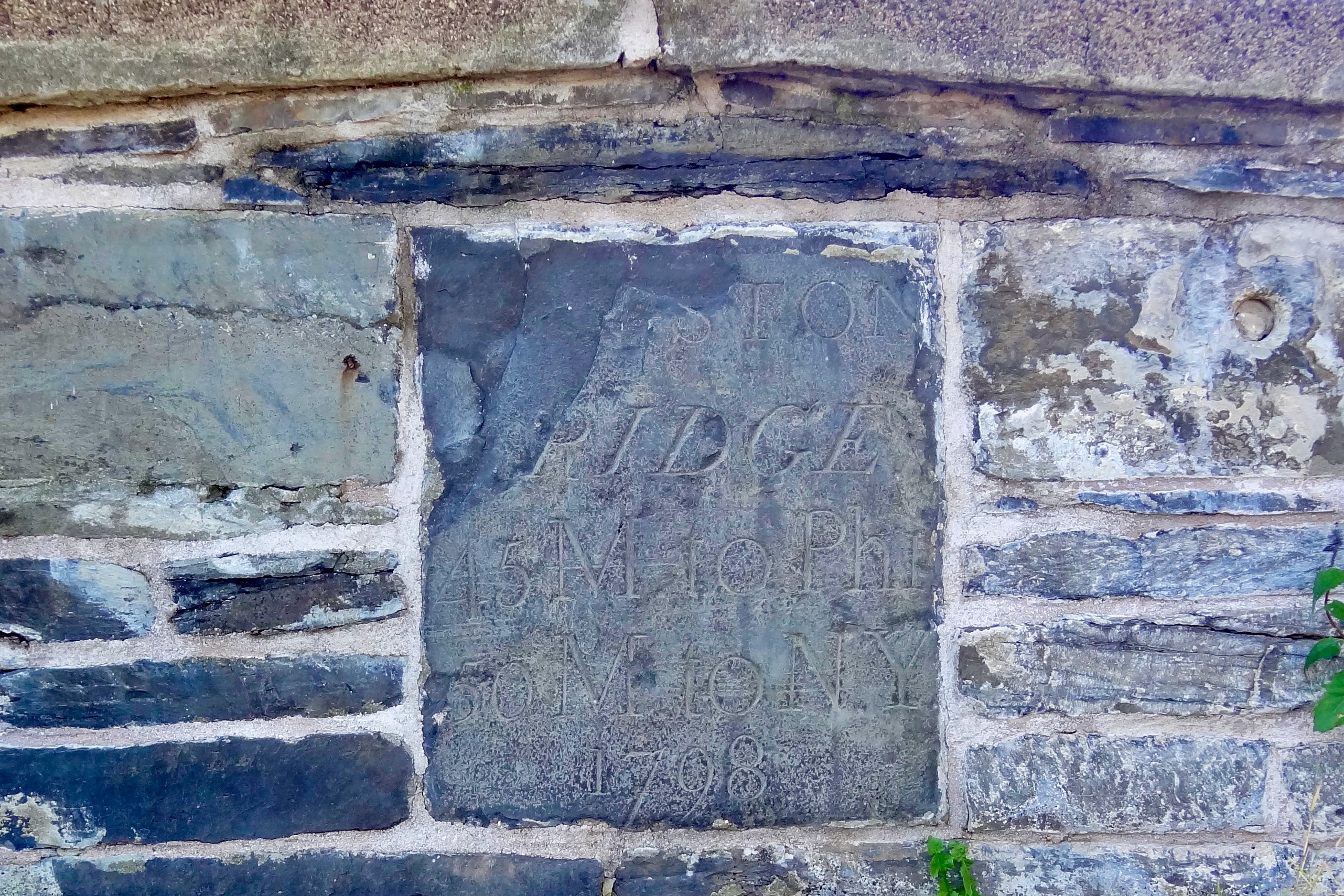
The mile marker from 1798, showing the distance to Philadelphia (45 miles) and New York City (50 miles)

== See also ==
- National Register of Historic Places listings in Mercer County, New Jersey
- National Register of Historic Places listings in Middlesex County, New Jersey
- National Register of Historic Places listings in Somerset County, New Jersey

== Works cited ==
- Craig, Robert W. (1982). "Kingston Mill Historic District". National Park Service. Archived from the original on May 8, 2025.
- Greiff, Constance M. (2000). "King's Highway Historic District". National Park Service. Archived from the original on January 7, 2026.
- Kidder, William L. (2020). Revolutionary Princeton 1774-1783 : the Biography of an American Town in the Heart of a Civil War. Permuted Press. ISBN 9781682619391.
- Muser, Jeanette K. (1998). Rocky Hill, Kingston and Griggstown. Images of America. Arcadia Publishing. ISBN 978-0-7385-5777-9.
