= Cynthia Gooding =

- Born: August 12, 1924; Rochester, Minnesota, United States
- Died: February 10, 1988 (aged 63); Kingston, New Jersey, US
- Genres: Traditional folk music, world music
- Occupation(s): Singer, guitarist
- Years active: Mid 1940s – 1970s
- Labels: Elektra, Riverside, Prestige Int., Camden

Cynthia Gooding (August 12, 1924 – February 10, 1988) was an American folk singer and musicologist who recorded traditional songs from various countries for Elektra Records in the 1950s and 1960s. Judy Collins wrote that she had been inspired by her.

== Life and career ==
She was born in Rochester, Minnesota, and grew up in Lake Forest, Illinois. In her late teens, she lived in Mexico City, where she acquired a love of folk music and the blues, learned Spanish, and developed her talents as a singer and guitar player. On returning to the US in the mid-1940s, she moved to New York City, and—encouraged by Josh White—began singing folk songs in Greenwich Village clubs, particularly with regular appearances at the Soho club and, later, Gerdes Folk City. Described as tall and elegant, she developed a following in New York City, and expanded her repertoire to include Turkish as well as traditional English songs, and Spanish, Mexican and Italian folk songs. She married Turkish-born Hasan Özbekhan in 1949; they divorced in the late 1950s.

After meeting Jac Holzman, who had recently set up Elektra Records, she recorded four 10-inch LPs for the label in 1953 and 1954. The cover sleeves were designed by Maurice Sendak, and the albums helped establish Elektra as a source of folk and world music and allowed Holzman to expand into new business ventures. Holzman later said:

"I met Cynthia Gooding and her husband at one of those folk parties in Greenwich Village which I sometimes describe as one of those places where there were a lot of wing chairs, candles, bullfight posters, and cheap wine. People would pass the guitar around, and it got passed to her. I was pretty impressed... She was one of the earliest artists I recorded. I remember being leery of someone not indigenous to those cultures singing those songs. I certainly knew the Moorish-Spanish connection, but I was unsure about her accent. I went to a couple of people and they said 'she's pure Castilian,' so that was okay with me. She did everything well. It was fun recording her."

On Friday, January 27, 1956, Gooding rented Weill Recital Hall at Carnegie Hall for $100, and presumably performed songs from her Elektra releases in the space. She wrote in the original liner notes that she obtained the songs from various sources, including street musicians; one of the Mexican songs was "La Bamba," recorded several years before Ritchie Valens' hit version. In 1957, material from two of the 10-inch LPs was combined into a single 12-inch album, Cynthia Gooding Sings Spanish, Mexican and Turkish Folk Songs. She also released two more LPs that year, Cynthia Gooding Sings of Faithful Lovers..., and A Young Man and A Maid: Love Songs of Many Lands, which included several duets with Theodore Bikel. She also released Languages of Love on the Riverside label in 1958, and the misleadingly titled The Best of Cynthia Gooding on the Prestige International label the following year.

In about 1960, she began hosting "Folksinger's Choice", a regular radio program on WBAI in New York. She made many recordings around Greenwich Village and elsewhere, as research and material for her shows, and in early 1962 conducted the first radio interview with Bob Dylan, before his first album was released. Gooding toured nationally, with her two daughters, and traveled to Spain where she collected recordings of flamenco music and befriended musicians including leading flamenco singer Juan Talega and guitarist Diego del Gastor.

After returning to the US in 1964, she lived in Princeton, New Jersey. She recorded an album of nursery rhymes with Don Drake, and in the late 1960s traveled around the US as part of a National Endowment for the Humanities program. She continued to make occasional performances during the 1970s.

She died of cancer in Kingston, New Jersey, in 1988, at the age of 63.

== Discography ==
- Cynthia Gooding Sings Turkish and Spanish Folk Songs (Elektra, 10", 1953)
- Mexican Folk Songs (Elektra, 10", 1953)
- Queen of Hearts: Early English Folk Songs (Elektra, 10", 1953)
- Italian Folk Songs (Elektra, 10", 1954)
- Cynthia Gooding Sings Spanish, Mexican and Turkish Folk Songs (Elektra, 1957)
- Cynthia Gooding Sings of Faithful Lovers and Other Phenomena (Elektra, 1957)
- A Young Man And A Maid: Love Songs of Many Lands (with Theodore Bikel) (Elektra, 1957)
- Languages of Love (Riverside, 1958)
- The Best of Cynthia Gooding (Prestige Int., 1959)
- A Treasury of Spanish & Mexican Folk Song (Elektra compilation, 1962)
- Mother Goose and Father Gander (with Don Drake) (Camden, 1965)
