= Evelyn College for Women =

Women's college in Princeton, New Jersey (1887–1897)

- U.S. Historic district – Contributing property
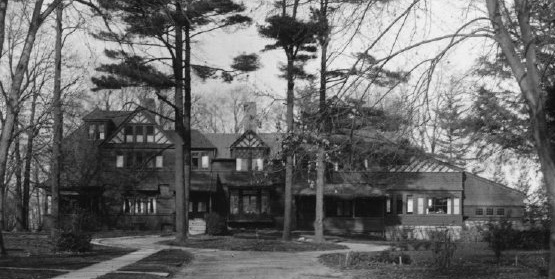
- The Pines, at 7-8 Evelyn Place during its time as home to the college
- Location: 91 Nassau St., Princeton, NJ
- Coordinates: 40°21′16.4″N 74°38′49.7″W
- Built: 1887
- Part of: Jugtown Historic District (ID86003670)
- Designated CP: January 22, 1987

Evelyn College for Women, often shortened to Evelyn College, was the coordinate women's college of Princeton University in Princeton, New Jersey between 1887 and 1897. It was the first women's college in the State of New Jersey.

== Background ==
Evelyn was founded by clergyman Joshua Hall McIlvaine, a Princeton alumnus and former professor at the institution. He named the college after Sir John Evelyn and was able to recruit most of Princeton's most noted faculty members, including Woodrow Wilson and Henry Fine, to teach at the college. Helen Magill White, the first woman in the United States to earn a Ph.D., also taught at Evelyn. It was located in two buildings: 7-8 Evelyn Place, a circa 1880 Queen Anne Victorian style structure known as "The Pines" (now two private residences), and a Colonial style building on the southwest corner of Nassau and Harrison Streets. 8 Evelyn Place was home to former Borough of Princeton Mayor Barbara Boggs Sigmund and her family for 45 years. In 2021, Number 8 was featured by the Historical Society of Princeton as part of its annual House Tour.

== Student body ==
The Evelyn student body was never composed of more than 50 students in one year and was made up primarily of the daughters of faculty members and sisters of male undergraduates. The women called themselves The Orange and the White, a reference to the colors of the university.

With a 50-to-1 ratio of men to women at Princeton, Evelyn students were subject to considerable harassment from their male counterparts. Police were employed to keep the men off the Evelyn campus, though the male students would still stand outside the gates chanting for the women to let them inside. Princeton and Evelyn students were rumored to have trysts in abandoned houses, a reputation which caused some families to ban their daughters from attending.

== Reputation and closure ==
In 1896, Harper's Bazaar published an article about the college, noting that "[i]n the most conservative town, in the most conservative state, right under the shadow of Nassau Hall, a women's college has evolved" and that the day would come when "our country shall...speak with equal pride of the sons and daughters of Princeton."

However, the college fell on hard times financially after the Panic of 1893 and struggled to keep enrollment up. It closed permanently in 1897 after McIlvaine's death. Women were not permitted to enroll at Princeton again until 1969, when the university became coeducational.

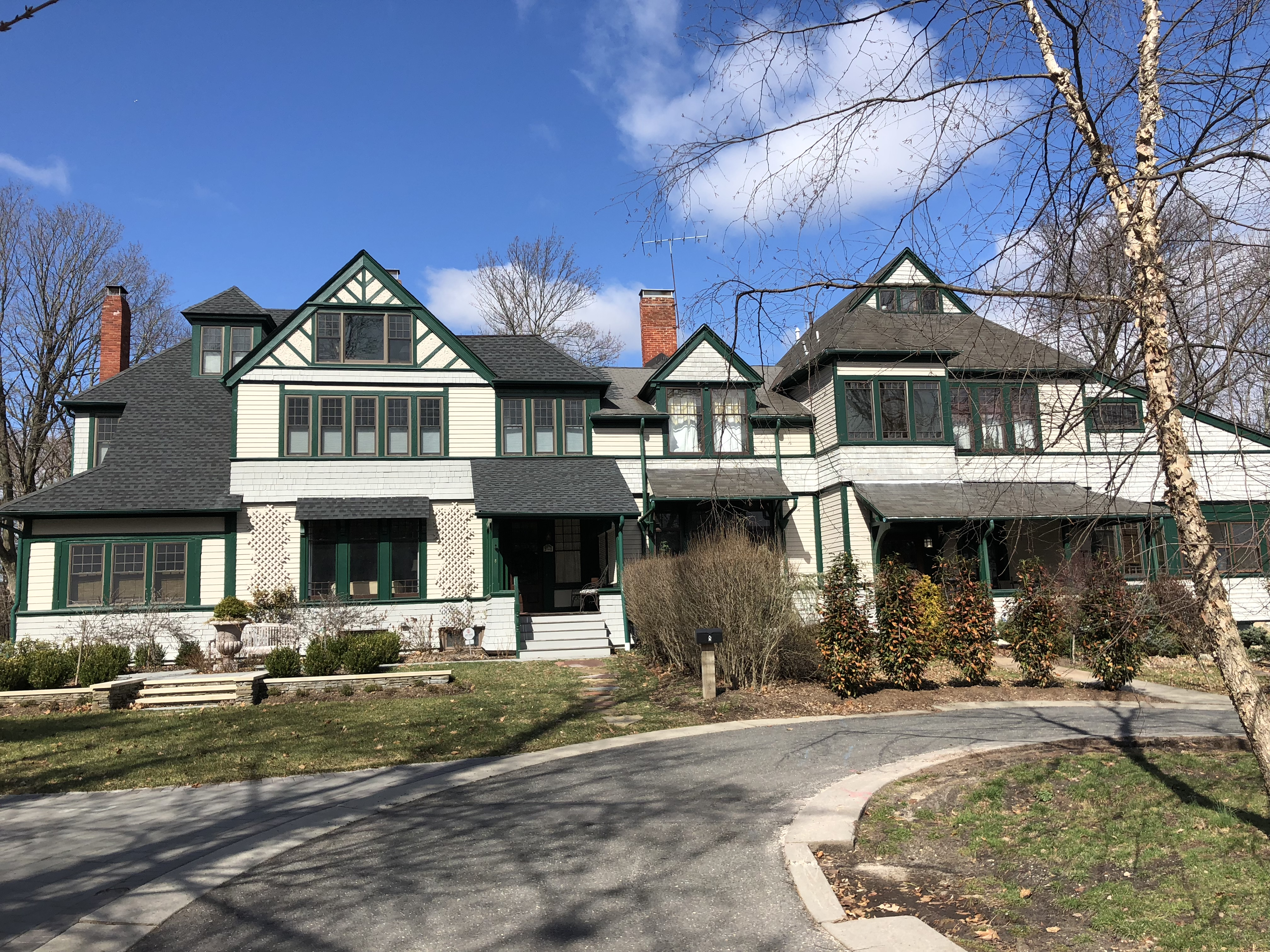
The Pines as it stands today. This building was part of the former home of the Evelyn College for Women, and is now divided into two private residences.

== See also ==
- Timeline of women's colleges in the United States
