= Kingston Bridge (Kingston, New Jersey) =

- U.S. Historic district – Contributing property
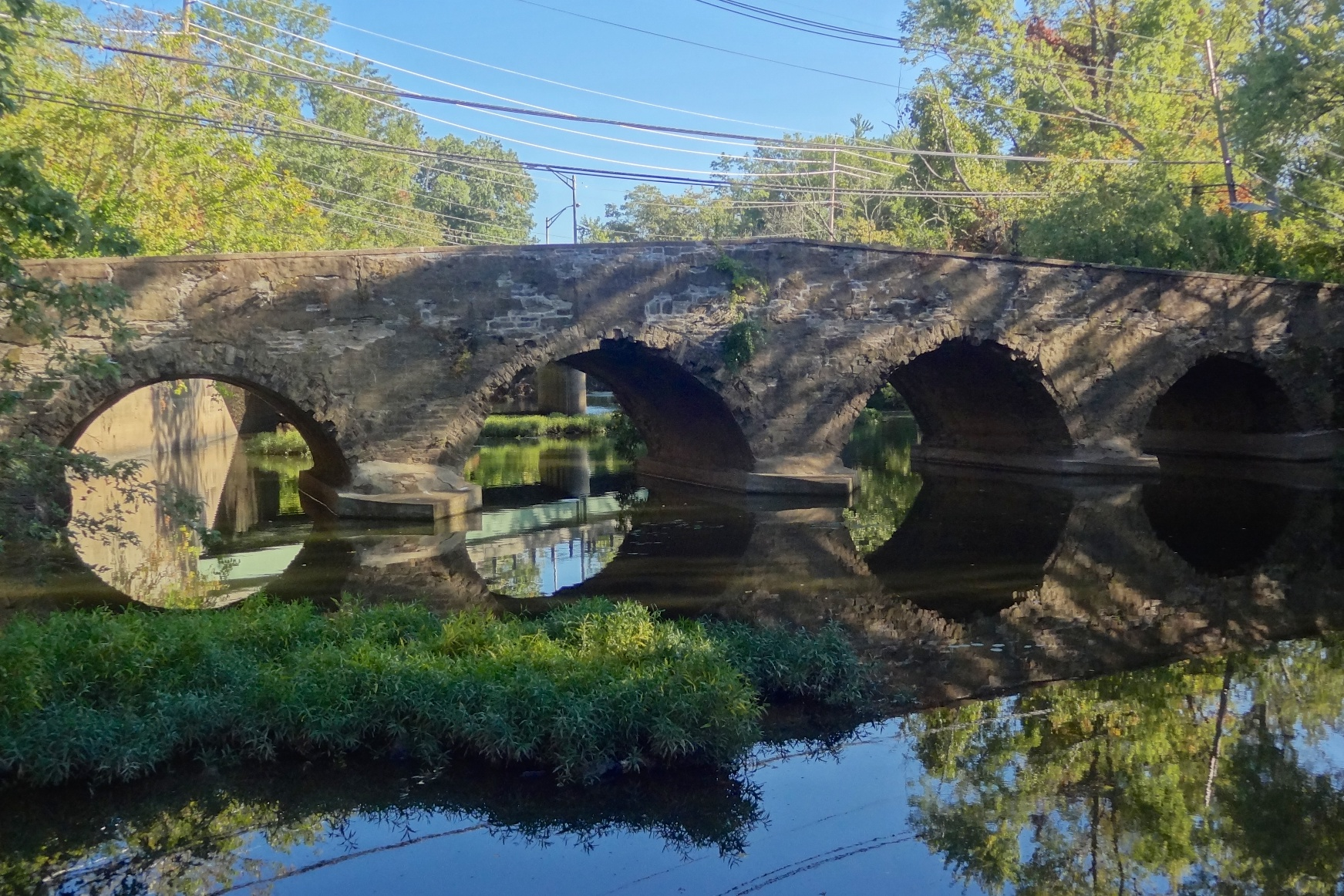

- Location within Somerset County, New Jersey Location within Middlesex County, New Jersey Location within Mercer County, New Jersey Location within New Jersey Location within the United States
- Location: Route 27, Franklin Township in Somerset County, South Brunswick in Middlesex County and Princeton in Mercer County in New Jersey
- Coordinates: 40.37375°N 74.62025°W
- Built: 1798
- Part of: Kingston Mill Historic District (ID86000707)
- Added to NRHP: April 10, 1986

The Kingston Bridge is a historic stone arch bridge crossing the Millstone River on the border of Franklin Township in Somerset County, South Brunswick in Middlesex County and Princeton in Mercer County in New Jersey. The borders for the three townships and their respective counties meet in the center of the bridge. The span used to carry New Jersey Route 27 over the Millstone River, but that road now bypasses the bridge on a newer span just to the north. It is Somerset County's oldest bridge, and is part of the Kingston Mill Historic District, listed on the National Register of Historic Places since 1986.

A previous bridge at the site was destroyed during the American Revolutionary War to halt advancing British troops. The current structure was completed in 1798.

== See also ==
- List of bridges on the National Register of Historic Places in New Jersey
