= Eleazer Wales =

First minister of Kingston Presbyterian Church

Reverend Eleazer Wales was the first minister of the Kingston Presbyterian Church, in Kingston, New Jersey. He played a prominent role in the Presbyterian movement in and around Philadelphia. On May 26, 1738, the Synod of Philadelphia ordered the creation of the Presbytery of New Brunswick, and Reverend Wales played a prominent role in its formation.
