= King's Highway (Charleston to Boston) =

Road in Colonial America

Route information
- Length: 1,300 mi (2,100 km)
- Existed: Late 1600s–1800s

Major junctions
- From: Charleston, South Carolina
- To: Boston, Massachusetts

Location
- Country: United States

Highway system
- Post Roads in the United States

The King's Highway was a roughly 1,300-mile (2,100 km) road laid out from 1650 to 1735 in the American colonies. It was built on the order of Charles II of England, who directed his colonial governors to link Charleston, South Carolina, and Boston, Massachusetts. The section north of New York City, laid out on January 22, 1673, became the Upper Boston Post Road. The road was finally completed in 1735. Much of the Post Road is now U.S. Route 1 and U.S. Route 20.

The King's Highway Historic District in New Jersey covers U.S. Route 206 and New Jersey Route 27, connecting Lawrenceville with Kingston through Princeton. In Pennsylvania, much of the route is now U.S. Route 13. (In Philadelphia, Route 13 becomes Frankford Avenue.) Through Maryland, the King's Highway largely follows U.S. Route 1. From Virginia southward, the modern U.S. Route 17 has many segments that follow the old King's Highway.

== History ==
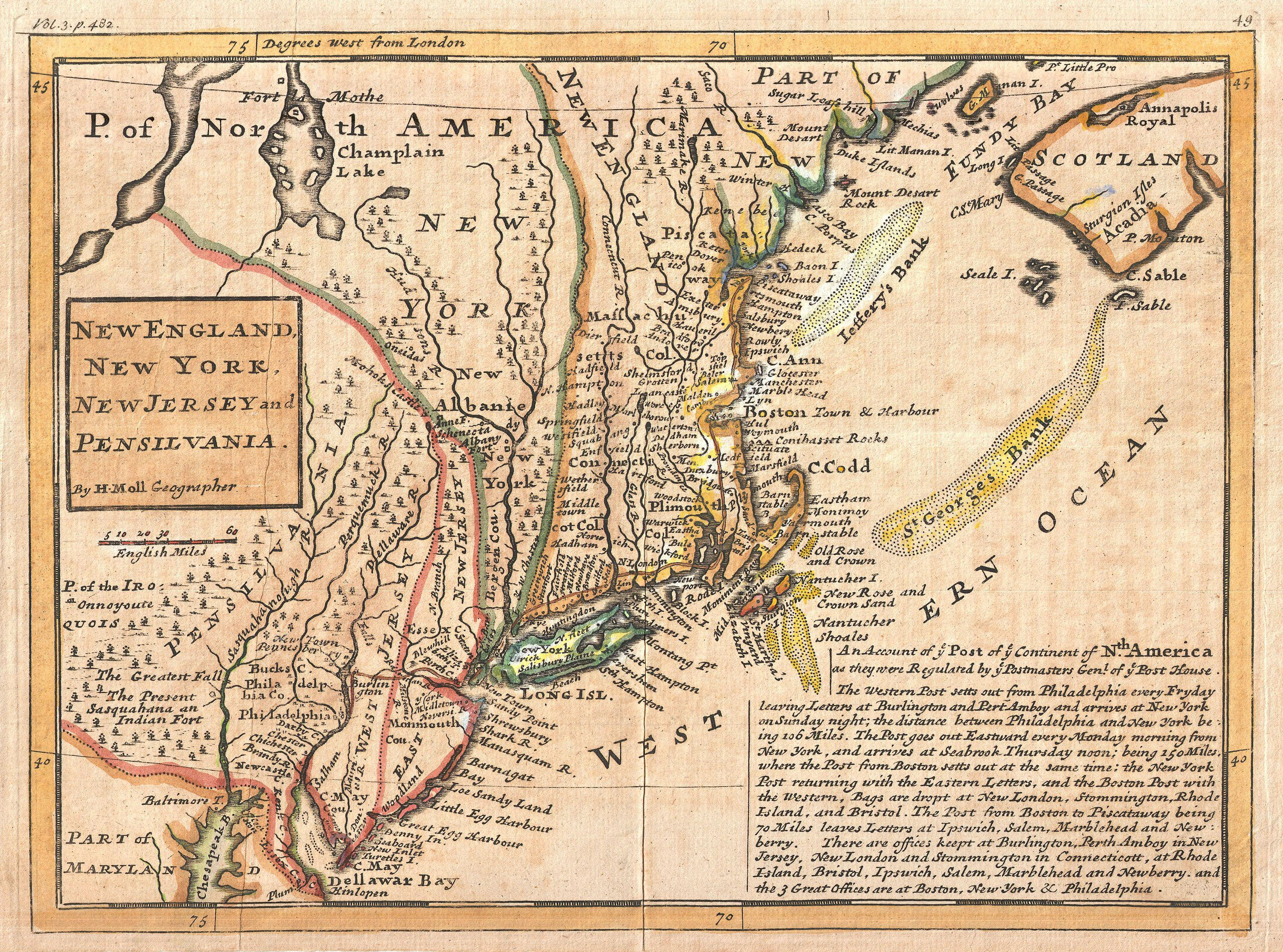
1729 map of New England, New York, New Jersey, and Pennsylvania by C. Moll with inset describing the postal system

The Boston Post Road was a system of mail-delivery routes between New York City and Boston that evolved into the first major highways in the United States. Some routes followed trails in use by Native Americans long before Europeans arrived. Some of these important native trails had been used long enough that they were two feet below the surrounding woodland.

Following a trail known as the Pequot Path, the Upper Post Road was first laid out in 1673. Used by post riders to deliver the mail, it was later widened and smoothed so that horse-drawn wagons or stagecoaches could use it. During the 19th century, turnpike companies took over and improved pieces of the road. Large sections of the various routes are still called the King's Highway and Boston Post Road.

In 1761, Postmaster General Benjamin Franklin ordered milestones placed along the route from Boston to Saco, Maine, then to Machias, as a northern extension of King's Highway, a route which is now marked by the Presumpscot Falls Bridge in Falmouth, Maine, among other landmarks. As part of his duties, Franklin conducted inspections of the roads that were used for delivering mail as settlements along the coast increased. One method of charging for mail service was by mileage, so Franklin invented an odometer to measure mileage more accurately. The King's Highway, as a result, morphed into the Post Road.

== Route ==
A map of the King's Highway showing modern state borders.

Herman Moll's 1729 "Post Map" describes the route:

An Account of ye Post of ye Continent of Nth. America as they were Regulated by ye Postmasters Genl. of ye Post House. The Western Post setts out from Philadelphia every Fryday leaving Letters at Burlington and Pert Amboy and arrives at New York on Sunday night; the distance between Philadelphia & New York being 106 Miles. The Post goes out Eastward every Monday morning from New York, and arrives at Seabrook Thursday noon; being 150 Miles, where the Post from Boston setts out at the same time: the New York Post returning with the Eastern Letters, and the Boston Post with the Western, Bags are dropt at New London, Stommington, Rhode Island, and Bristol. The Post from Boston to Pisacataway being 70 Miles leaves Letters at Ipswich, Salem, Marblehead and Newberry. There are offices kept at Burlington, Perth Amboy in New Jersey, New London and Stommington in Connecticott, at Rhode Island, Bristol, Ipswich, Salem, Marblehead and Newberry. and the 3 Great Offices are at Boston, New York, & Philadelphia.

- Boston, Massachusetts
- New Haven, Connecticut
- Fairfield, Connecticut
- Greenwich, Connecticut
- Rye, New York
- Kingsbridge, New York
- New York City, New York
- Newark, New Jersey
- Elizabeth, New Jersey
- Rahway, New Jersey
- Perth Amboy, New Jersey
- New Brunswick, New Jersey
- Princeton, New Jersey
- Lawrenceville, New Jersey
- Trenton, New Jersey
- Bordentown, New Jersey
- Burlington, New Jersey
- Philadelphia, Pennsylvania
- Chester, Pennsylvania
- Wilmington, Delaware
- New Castle, Delaware
- Baltimore, Maryland
- Annapolis, Maryland
- Alexandria, Virginia
- Fredericksburg, Virginia
- Bowling Green, Virginia
- King William, Virginia
- Williamsburg, Virginia
- Yorktown, Virginia
- Hampton, Virginia
- Norfolk, Virginia
- Suffolk, Virginia
- Edenton, North Carolina
- New Bern, North Carolina
- Wilmington, North Carolina
- Georgetown, South Carolina
- Charleston, South Carolina

== Gallery ==
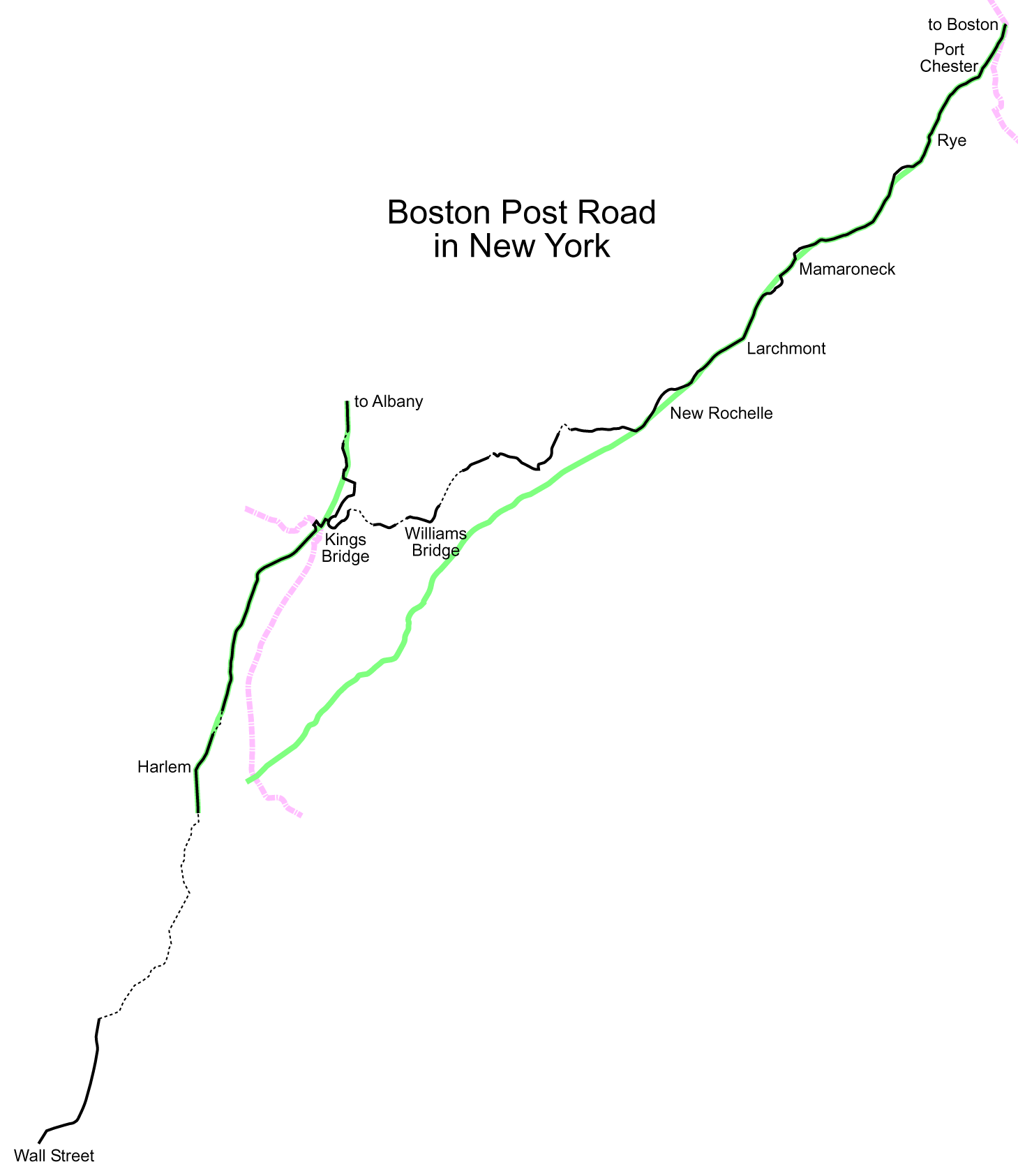
The Post Road in New York

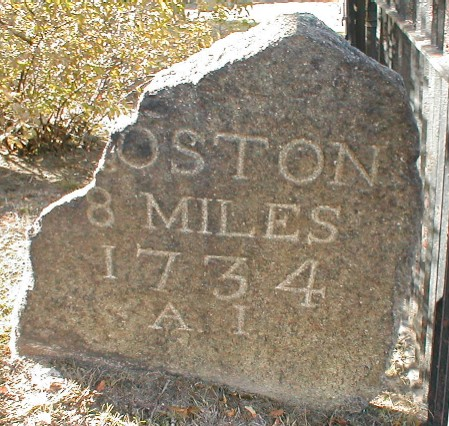
Milestone 8 on the Upper Post Road in Harvard Square

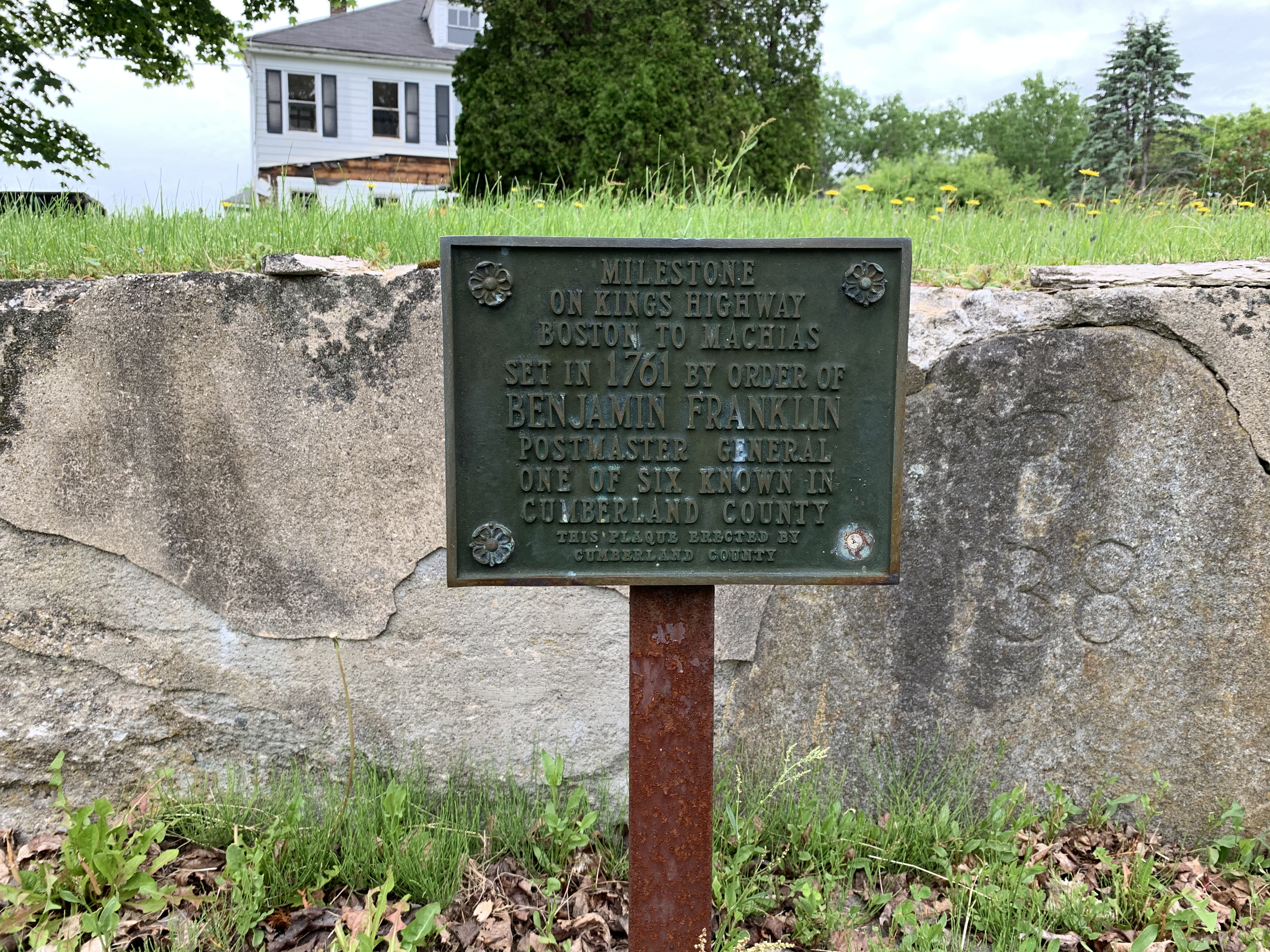
A milestone in Yarmouth, Maine, on the Boston-to-Machias "King's Highway" route. The milestone, now incorporated into a wall, is engraved with "B 138," to denote its distance of 138 miles from Boston

== See also ==
- Washington-Rochambeau Revolutionary Route
- Assunpink Trail
- King's Highway Historic District
- Frankford Avenue Bridge
