= Kingston, New Jersey =

Populated place in Middlesex and Somerset counties, New Jersey, US

- Census-designated place
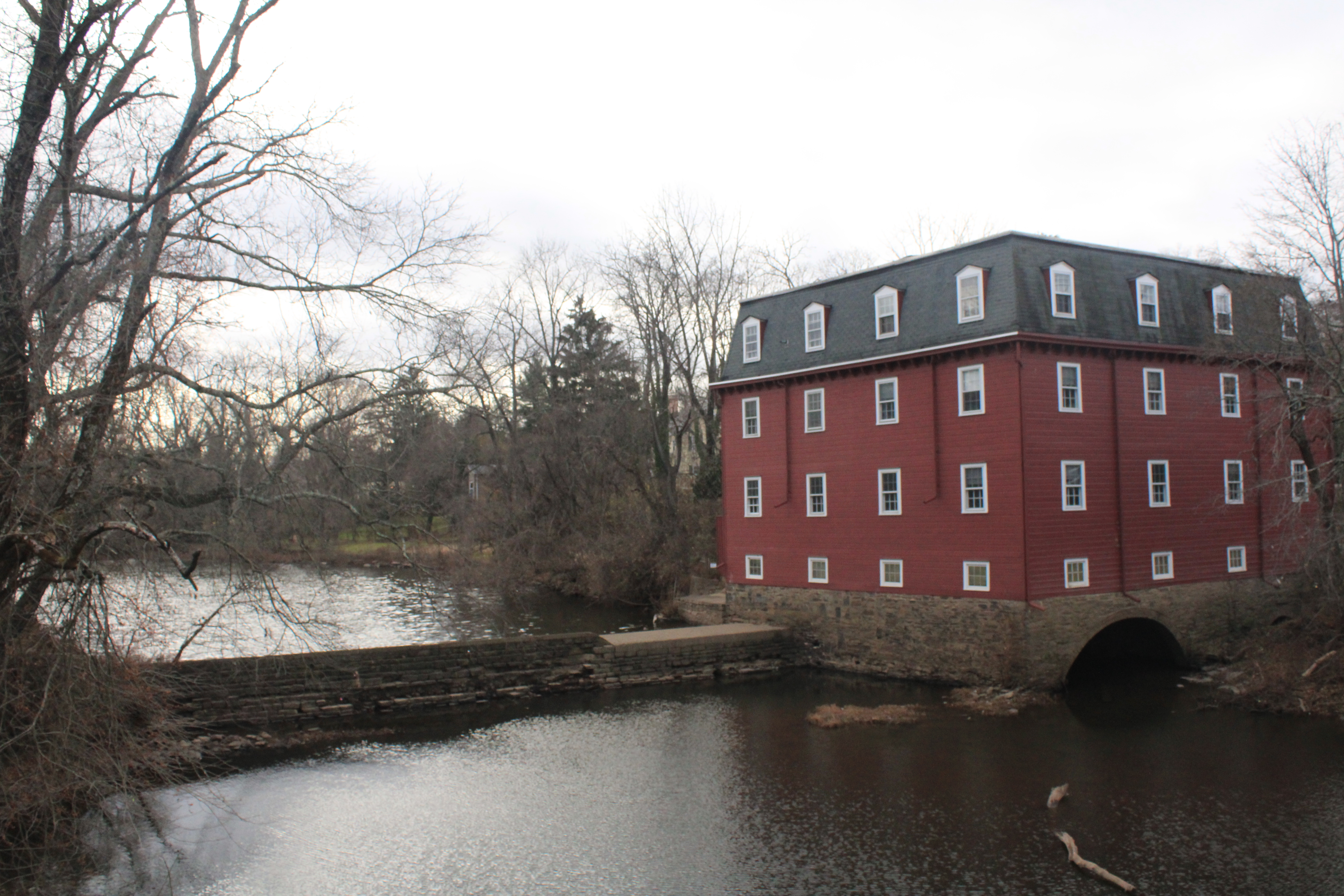
- Kingston Mill on the Millstone River

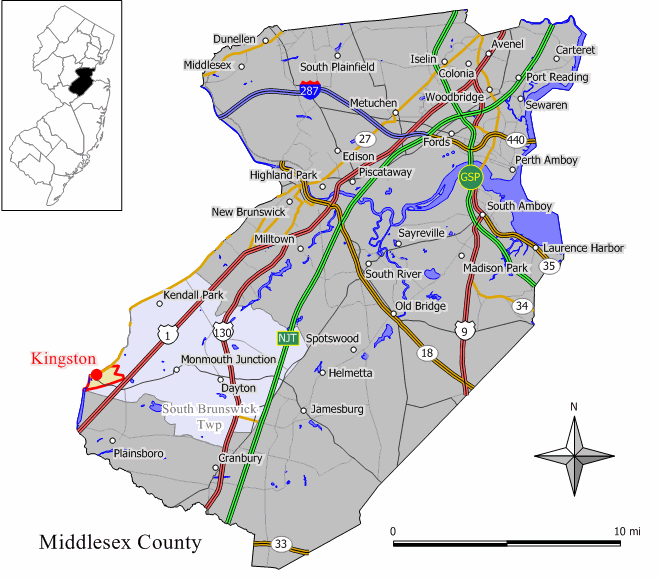
- Map of Kingston showing section in Middlesex County. Inset: Location of Middlesex County in New Jersey.

- Location in Middlesex County Location in New Jersey Location in the United States
- Coordinates: 40.387103°N 74.6152°W
- Country: United States
- State: New Jersey
- Counties: Middlesex and Somerset
- Townships: South Brunswick and Franklin

Area
  - Total: 1.94 sq mi (5.03 km^{2})
  - Land: 1.87 sq mi (4.85 km^{2})
  - Water: 0.069 sq mi (0.18 km^{2}) 3.80%
- Elevation: 121 ft (37 m)

Population (2020)
  - Total: 1,581
  - Density: 843.8/sq mi (325.81/km^{2})
- Time zone: UTC−05:00 (Eastern (EST))
  - Summer (DST): UTC−04:00 (Eastern (EDT))
- ZIP Codes: 08528 (Kingston); 08540 (Princeton)
- Area code: 609
- FIPS code: 34-36930
- GNIS feature ID: 02584006

Kingston is an unincorporated community and census-designated place (CDP) along the border of South Brunswick Township in Middlesex County and Franklin Township in Somerset County, and also located relatively near Princeton in Mercer County in the U.S. state of New Jersey. The historic settlement is in the Raritan Valley region, located along the course of the Millstone River. As of the 2020 census, the CDP's population was 1,581, of which 1,272 were in South Brunswick Township and 309 in Franklin Township.

The New Jersey State Planning Commission created the Kingston Village Advisory Committee in 2001 to address issues related to this distinct area. Both South Brunswick and Franklin appoint members to the committee, which holds an annual meeting to discuss issues pertinent to the Kingston area. Kingston is (so far) unique as the only village center that has been officially designated by the New Jersey State Planning Commission.

Kingston is located in five historic districts and is part of the Millstone River Valley Scenic Byway. The Delaware and Raritan Canal and Rockingham State Historic Site are a short distance away.

== History ==
Jediah Higgins purchased 1,000 acres (4.0 km^{2}) from the Native Americans in the early 18th century and the town of Kingston was established. Kingston's location on the Lenape Assunpink Trail where it crossed the Millstone River and later becoming part of the King's Highway was the prime factor in its early prominence. Kingston was by far the most active and important village, being situated on both the heavily traveled King's Road and Millstone River, combining commercial activities of both mills and taverns.

== Geography ==
Kingston is in southwestern Middlesex County, in the western end of South Brunswick Township, and in southern Somerset County, occupying the southern tip of Franklin Township. It is bordered to the east by Heathcote in Middlesex County and to the north by East Rocky Hill in Somerset County. It is bordered to the west by the Millstone River, which forms the Mercer County line. The borough of Princeton borders Kingston across the Millstone River.

New Jersey Route 27 is Kingston's Main Street; Route 27 leads southwest 3.5 miles (5.6 km) to its terminus in the center of Princeton, and northeast 12 miles (19 km) to New Brunswick, the Middlesex county seat.

According to the U.S. Census Bureau, the Kingston CDP has an area of 1.94 square miles (5.02 km^{2}), of which 1.87 square miles (4.84 km^{2}) are land and 0.07 square miles (0.18 km^{2}), or 3.55%, are water. The Millstone River, which runs along the western edge of Kingston, is a north-flowing tributary of the Raritan River and thus part of the watershed of Lower New York Bay.

== Demographics ==
Historical population
Census	Pop.	Note	%±
1990	1,047		—
2000	1,292		23.4%
2010	1,493		15.6%
2020	1,581		5.9%
Population sources: 1950 1960 1970; 1980 1990 2000; 2010 2020

Kingston first appeared as a census designated place in the 1990 U.S. census.

=== 2020 census ===
Kingston CDP, New Jersey – Racial and ethnic composition Note: the US Census treats Hispanic/Latino as an ethnic category. This table excludes Latinos from the racial categories and assigns them to a separate category. Hispanics/Latinos may be of any race.
Race / Ethnicity (NH = Non-Hispanic)	Pop 2000	Pop 2010	Pop 2020	% 2000	% 2010	% 2020
White alone (NH)	874	1,053	875	67.65%	70.53%	55.34%
Black or African American alone (NH)	103	82	106	7.97%	5.49%	6.70%
Native American or Alaska Native alone (NH)	1	1	1	0.08%	0.07%	0.06%
Asian alone (NH)	130	186	322	10.06%	12.46%	20.37%
Native Hawaiian or Pacific Islander alone (NH)	0	0	0	0.00%	0.00%	0.00%
Other race alone (NH)	6	2	17	0.46%	0.13%	1.08%
Mixed race or Multiracial (NH)	27	24	53	2.09%	1.61%	3.35%
Hispanic or Latino (any race)	151	145	207	11.69%	9.71%	13.09%
Total	1,292	1,493	1,581	100.00%	100.00%	100.00%

=== 2010 census ===
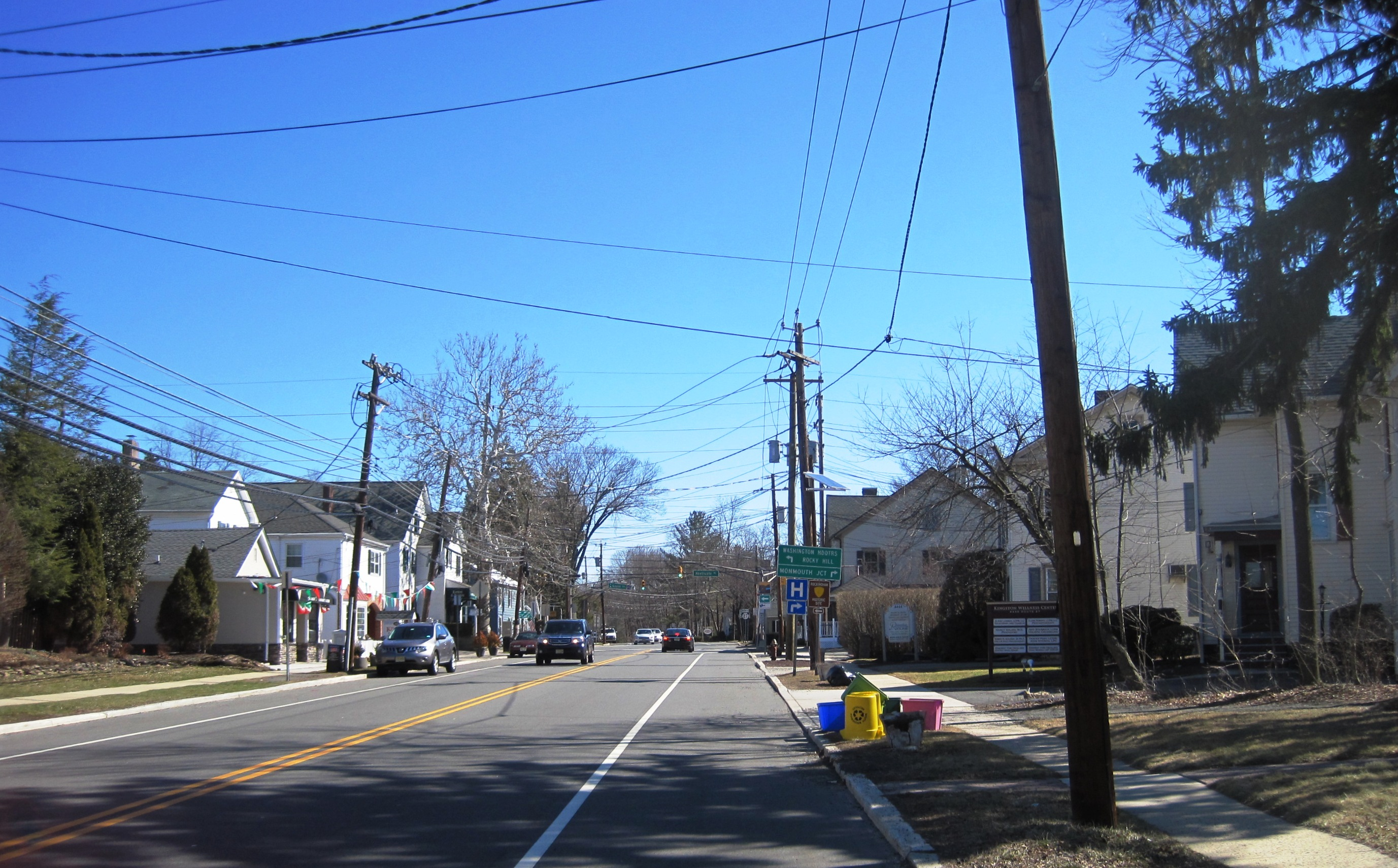
Kingston as seen from northbound Route 27

==== Middlesex County portion ====
The 2010 United States census counted 1,222 people, 533 households, and 303 families in the CDP. The population density was 1,396.4 people per square mile (539.2 people/km^{2}). There were 566 housing units at an average density of 646.8 units per square mile (249.7 units/km^{2}). The racial makeup was 71.28% (871) White, 6.30% (77) Black or African American, 0.25% (3) Native American, 14.73% (180) Asian, 0.00% (0) Pacific Islander, 5.32% (65) from other races, and 2.13% (26) from two or more races. Hispanic or Latino of any race were 10.64% (130) of the population.

Of the 533 households, 26.1% had children under the age of 18; 47.8% were married couples living together; 5.6% had a female householder with no husband present and 43.2% were non-families. Of all households, 37.5% were made up of individuals and 11.1% had someone living alone who was 65 years of age or older. The average household size was 2.29 and the average family size was 3.10.

22.2% of the population were under the age of 18, 7.4% from 18 to 24, 27.5% from 25 to 44, 30.4% from 45 to 64, and 12.6% who were 65 years of age or older. The median age was 40.9 years. For every 100 females, the population had 94.9 males. For every 100 females ages 18 and older there were 90.6 males.

==== Somerset County portion ====
The 2010 United States census counted 271 people, 124 households, and 81 families in the CDP. The population density was 198.9 people per square mile (76.8 people/km^{2}). There were 126 housing units at an average density of 92.5 units per square mile (35.7 units/km^{2}). The racial makeup was 94.10% (255) White, 2.58% (7) Black or African American, 0.00% (0) Native American, 2.21% (6) Asian, 0.00% (0) Pacific Islander, 0.74% (2) from other races, and 0.37% (1) from two or more races. Hispanic or Latino of any race were 5.54% (15) of the population.

Of the 124 households, 23.4% had children under the age of 18; 52.4% were married couples living together; 7.3% had a female householder with no husband present and 34.7% were non-families. Of all households, 28.2% were made up of individuals and 10.5% had someone living alone who was 65 years of age or older. The average household size was 2.19 and the average family size was 2.68.

16.6% of the population were under the age of 18, 4.1% from 18 to 24, 28.8% from 25 to 44, 31.4% from 45 to 64, and 19.2% who were 65 years of age or older. The median age was 45.5 years. For every 100 females, the population had 103.8 males. For every 100 females ages 18 and older there were 94.8 males.

=== 2000 census ===
As of the 2000 United States census there were 1,292 people, 561 households, and 315 families living in the CDP. The population density was 554.3 people/km^{2} (1,436 people/mi^{2}). There were 576 housing units at an average density of 247.1 units/km^{2} (640 units/mi^{2}). The racial makeup of the CDP was 74.07% White, 8.05% African American, 0.62% Native American, 10.06% Asian, 4.33% from other races, and 2.86% from two or more races. Hispanic or Latino of any race were 11.69% of the population.

There were 561 households, out of which 24.4% had children under the age of 18 living with them, 44.7% were married couples living together, 8.4% had a female householder with no husband present, and 43.7% were non-families. 36.4% of all households were made up of individuals, and 8.0% had someone living alone who was 65 years of age or older. The average household size was 2.30 and the average family size was 3.08.

In the CDP the population was spread out, with 20.3% under the age of 18, 6.7% from 18 to 24, 36.4% from 25 to 44, 23.1% from 45 to 64, and 13.5% who were 65 years of age or older. The median age was 38 years. For every 100 females, there were 93.4 males. For every 100 females age 18 and over, there were 90.7 males.

The median income for a household in the CDP was $65,962, and the median income for a family was $80,242. Males had a median income of $56,371 versus $46,250 for females. The per capita income for Kingston was $34,457. None of the families and 1.0% of the population were living below the poverty line, including no under eighteens and none of those over 64.

== Religion ==
=== Kingston Presbyterian Church ===
The Kingston Presbyterian Church was organized in 1723 and was initially located in a log building adjacent to the Millstone River. The old tombstones surround the site where the church once stood in the Kingston Cemetery. The Reverend Eleazer Wales was the first recorded minister of the church. The original church building in the cemetery burned down in 1791, and new building was erected in 1792 on the original foundation. The congregation used this building until 1852, when the larger building on Main Street in Kingston was constructed on land purchased from Elijah Stout. In 1853, the church building in the cemetery was sold and was later dismantled. Two additions were constructed on the 1852 site. Sunday school rooms were added to the back of the structure in the late 1940s. In the late 1980s another addition was added which added a new kitchen facility, additional space in the assembly room, pastors study and office.

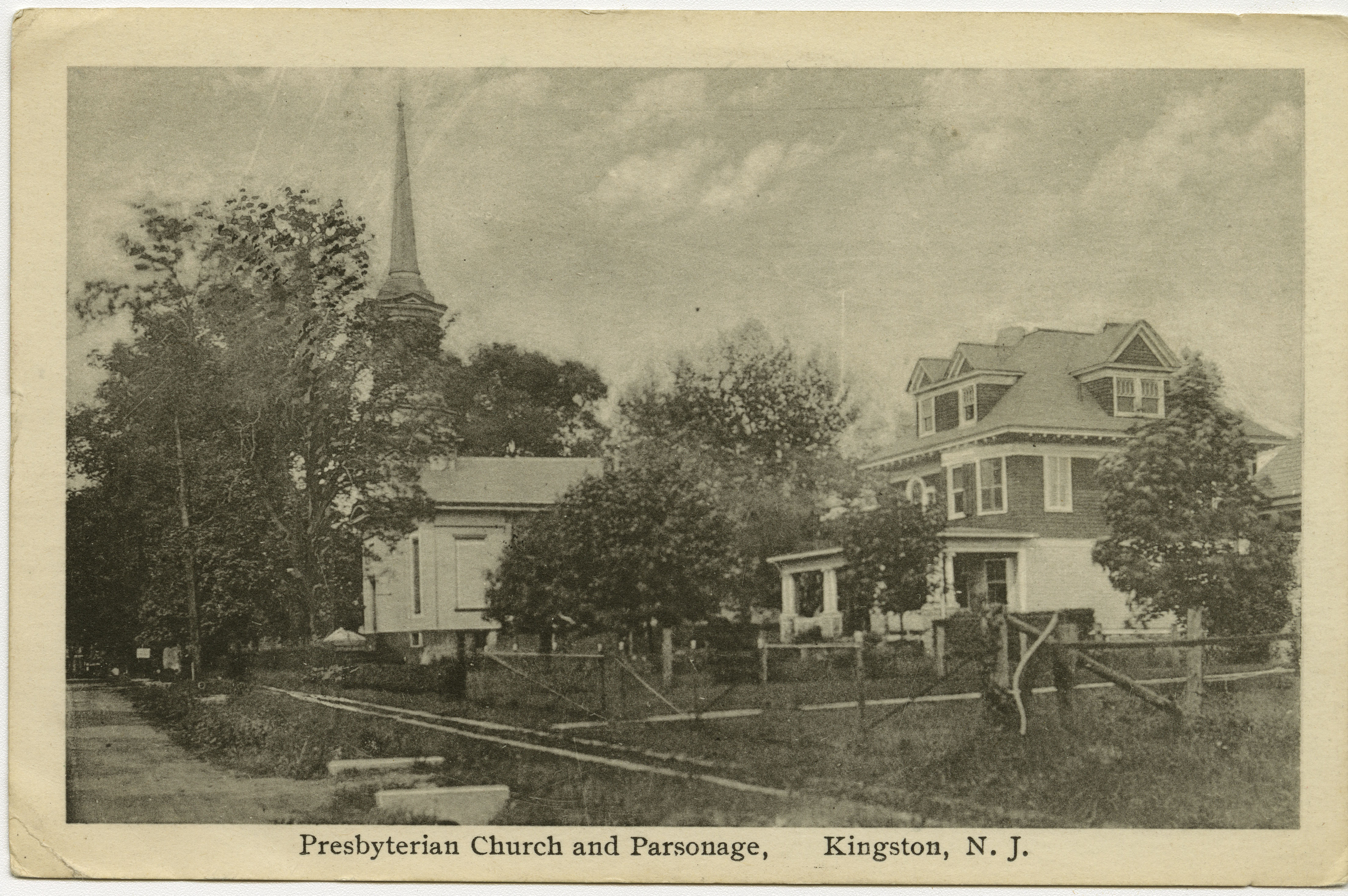
Kingston Presbyterian Church and Manse pre-1923

The church suffered through some difficult times during the remainder of the 1700s. During this period, Princeton University was built and the village of Princeton expanded, while the population of Kingston declined. (At that time, Kingston extended as far as Snowden Lane.) Consequently, the church lost many members to the "new" Presbyterian Church down the road in Princeton.

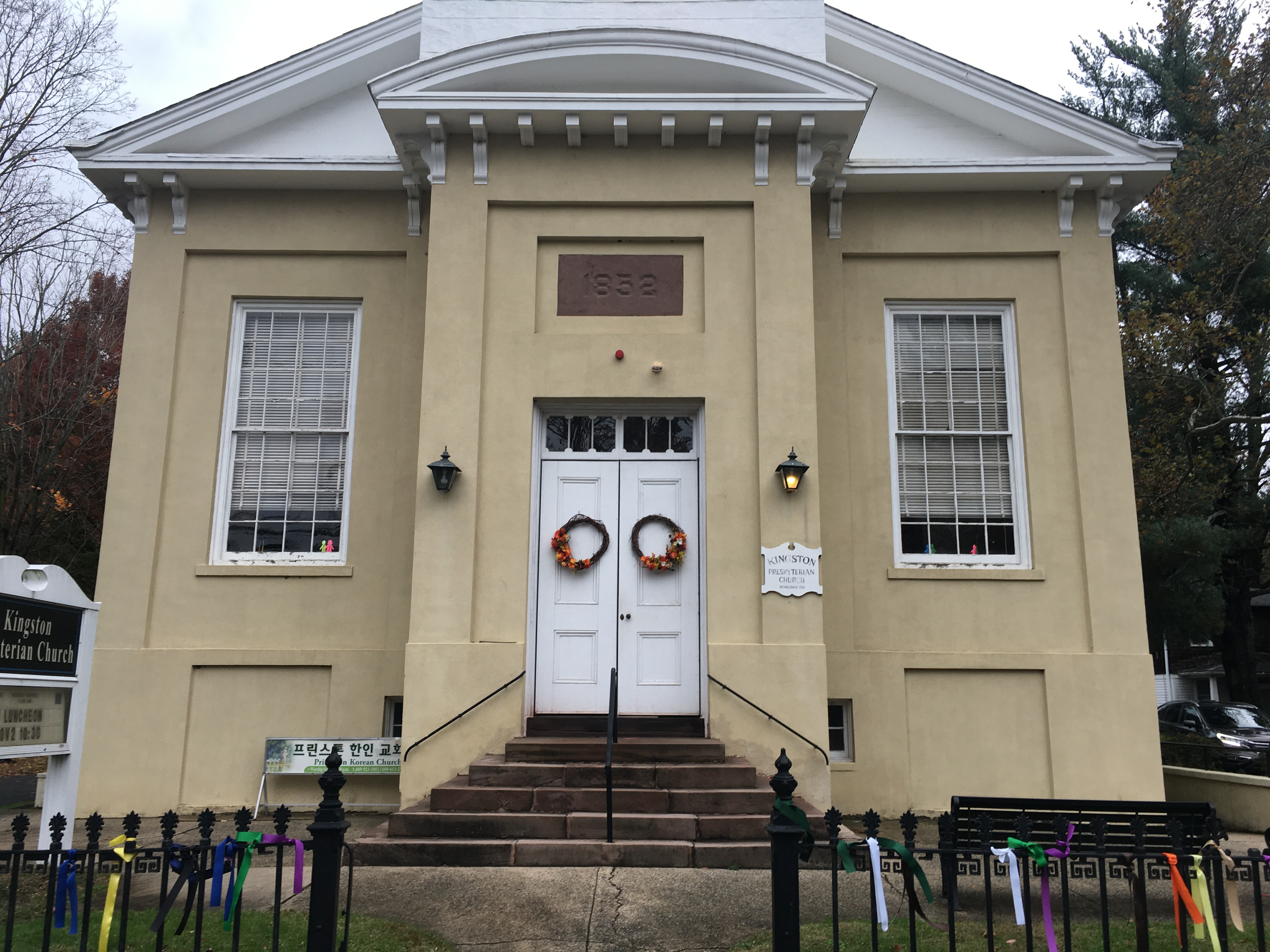
Kingston Presbyterian Church circa October 31, 2019

It was also during this time that the Revolutionary War was fought in the area, and British officers were quartered in local homes. Gen. Washington became a recognizable figure in the Kingston area at the time. Not only did he lead his troops past the church to escape Cornwallis, but he also had his headquarters hardly a mile from the church while the Continental Congress sat in Nassau Hall.

In 1800, the Kingston Presbyterian Church began a period of prosperity and growth, which continues to this day. The church sent its first foreign missionaries to China in the early 1800s.

=== Kingston United Methodist Church ===
During the month of February 1878, the people of the Methodist Episcopal Church at Rocky Hill brought an evangelist, Miss Lizzie Sharp, to conduct revival meetings in their church. There were some twenty or more of Kingston people who attended these meetings, and who decided to form a Methodist church in Kingston. A site was purchased for $250 on what is now Church Street, across from the Kingston Cemetery. Building began September 20, 1878, and was completed and dedicated on January 30, 1879. A nursery was later added.

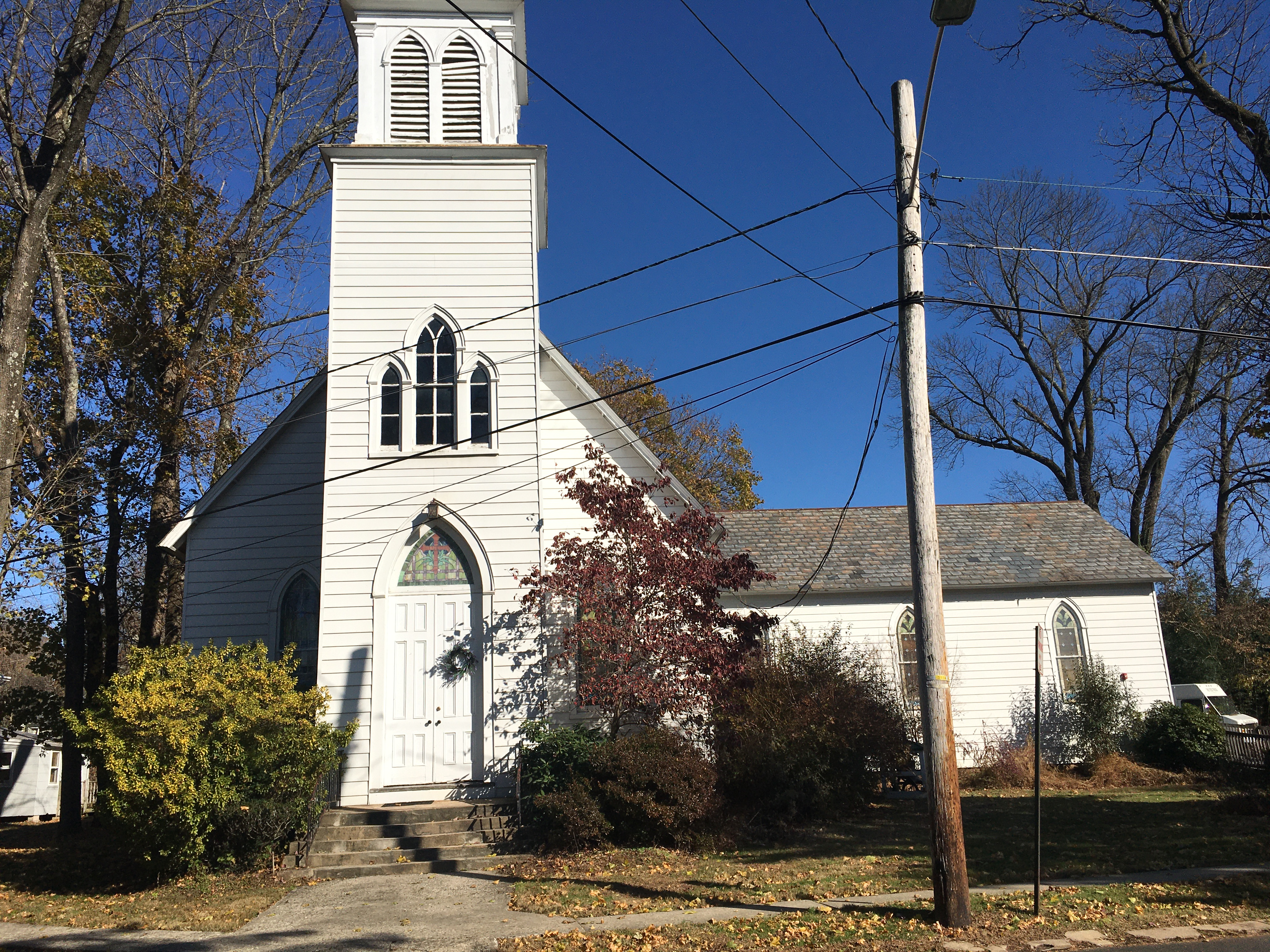
Kingston United Methodist Church November 13, 2019

== National Register of Historic Places ==
The following sites and districts in Kingston are listed on the National Register of Historic Places:

- Rockingham Historic Site, George Washington's last war-time headquarters in 1783, added in 1970 it is #70000394.
- Delaware and Raritan Canal Historic District was added in 1973, it is district #73001105.
- Kingston Mill Historic District was added in 1986, it is district #86000707.
- Kingston Village Historic District was added in 1990, it is district #89002163.
- King's Highway Historic District was added in 2000, it is district #00001493.
- Princeton Nurseries Historic District, was added in August 2018, it is district #08000899.

== Notable people ==
People who were born in, residents of, or otherwise closely associated with Kingston include:

- Cynthia Gooding (1924–1988), folk singer
- Andrew Zwicker (born 1964), physicist and member of the New Jersey General Assembly
