= New Jersey State Planning Commission =

State agency of New Jersey, United States

Agency overview
- Jurisdiction: New Jersey
- Agency executives: Edward J. McKenna, Jr., Chair; Donna Rendeiro, Acting Executive Director
- Parent agency: New Jersey Department of Community Affairs
- Website: http://www.state.nj.us/dca/divisions/osg/commissions/spc.html

The New Jersey State Planning Commission is responsible for oversight of planning issues affecting the U.S. state of New Jersey. The Commission consists of 17 members representing State government, local government and the public. Local government and public members are appointed by the Governor of New Jersey and approved by the New Jersey Legislature for three-year terms. The full Commission generally meets monthly, and approved meeting summaries of Commission meetings are posted online. The Director of the Office of Smart Growth serves as Executive Director and Secretary of the State Planning Commission.
