= Assunpink Trail =

Native American trail

The Assunpink Trail was a Native American trail in what later became Middlesex, Somerset, and Mercer counties in the central and western part of New Jersey. Like Assunpink Creek, the trail takes its name from the Lenape language Ahsën'pink, meaning "stony, watery place".

One of many Pre-Columbian era trails across the territory, the Assunpink travelled between the Raritan River in the north and the Delaware River in the south crossing relatively flat floodplain of the Millstone River. Over the years the approximate route of the trail has been developed and known as the Old Dutch Trail, The Kings Highway, Lincoln Highway, and Route 27.

At the time of European colonization the area was inhabited by an Algonquian people known as the Lenape and later called the Delaware Indians. Dutch trappers/traders from New Netherland used the trail in the late 17th century between its settlements on the Hudson River and those on the Delaware River and were later followed by early settlers to begin populating the interior. After the British takeover of the colony, and the establishment of the Province of New Jersey, the trail became a part major thoroughfare between Philadelphia and Perth Amboy, the capital of East Jersey and a major port. By 1698 it was known as the Kings Highway, and by the early 1700s had been cleared and widened near a new bridge crossing at Kingston. During the American Revolution George Washington made use of the road to circulate in the region during his campaigns at the Battle of Trenton, the Battle of Princeton, and the Battle of Monmouth.

The Princeton and Kingston Branch Turnpike, a turnpike road chartered on December 3, 1807, ran from Trenton to Kingston. During the early automotive age, route became a portion of the Lincoln Highway, the United States' first transcontinental highway that was established in 1913 to run from New York City to San Francisco. Today the southern portion of New Jersey Route 27 follows the path.

== See also ==
- Millstone Valley Scenic Byway
- Delaware and Raritan Canal
- Great Trail
- Lenape Trail
- Minisink Archeological Site
- Nassau Street (Princeton)
- Abbott Farm Historic District
- Route of the Lincoln Highway
