= Old Bridge High School =

High school in Middlesex County, New Jersey, US

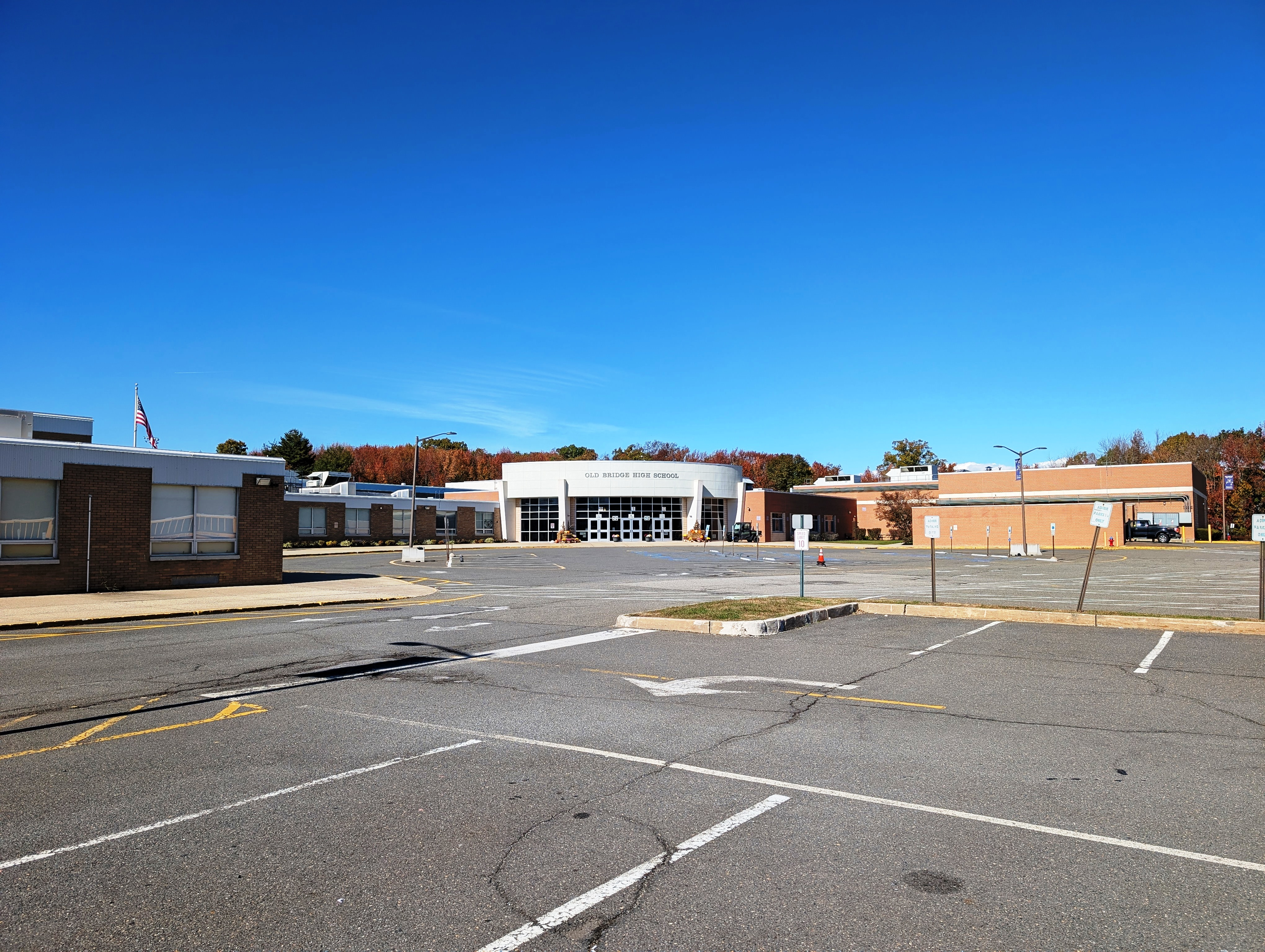

Location
- 4209 Route 516; Old Bridge Township, Middlesex County, New Jersey 07747; United States; 40.4040°N 74.2710°W

Information
- Type: Public high school
- Motto: As Knights, we recognize the importance of lifelong learning, showing respect for each other, taking pride in ourselves and always doing the right thing.
- Established: September 5, 1994; 32 years ago
- School district: Old Bridge Township Public Schools
- NCES School ID: 340927003496
- Principal: Sally Fazio (main campus); James Oliveri(GNC)
- Faculty: 196.2 FTEs
- Grades: 9-12
- Enrollment: 2,659 (as of 2024–25)
- Student to teacher ratio: 13.6:1
- Campus: Suburban
- Colors: Purple black and white
- Athletics conference: Greater Middlesex Conference (general); Big Central Football Conference (football); Garden State Esports (Esports)
- Mascot: Sir Obie The Knight
- Team name: Knights
- Rival: East Brunswick High School
- Accreditation: Middle States Association of Colleges and Schools
- Newspaper: Knight Life
- Yearbook: Excalibur
- Website: www.oldbridgeadmin.org/o/obhs

Old Bridge High School (formed from combining the former Cedar Ridge and Madison Central high schools) is a four-year comprehensive public high school that serves students in ninth through twelfth grades from Old Bridge Township in Middlesex County, in the U.S. state of New Jersey, operating as the lone secondary school of the Old Bridge Township Public Schools. The school is located on County Route 516 in Old Bridge Township, however, it is assigned a Matawan mailing address. The school has been accredited by the Middle States Association of Colleges and Schools Commission on Elementary and Secondary Schools since 1970; the school is accredited until January 2032.

Through partnerships with Fairleigh Dickinson University and Middlesex County College, students can take college courses for credit in both high school and college.

As of the 2024–25 school year, the school had an enrollment of 2,659 students and 196.2 classroom teachers (on an FTE basis), for a student–teacher ratio of 13.6:1. There were 565 students (21.2% of enrollment) eligible for free lunch and 167 (6.3% of students) eligible for reduced-cost lunch. Based on 2021–22 data from the New Jersey Department of Education, it was the fifth-largest high school in the state and one of 29 schools with more than 2,000 students.

The school operates from 7:35 A.M. to 2:00 P.M. and runs on a 6-period schedule using block scheduling. Seniors have the privilege of registering for late arrival or early release from either block schedule.

== History ==
Old Bridge High School opened in September 1994. It was formed from the merger of Cedar Ridge High School and Madison Central High School, which were the two existing public high schools in Old Bridge Township. By the 1980s, the enrollment in the two predecessor schools had been little more than half the combined peak of 4,000 that had been reached in the 1970s. The district estimated that the combination of the two schools into a single facility would save $600,000 per year (equivalent to $900,000 in 2025) after up-front costs of the merger estimated at $400,000. OBHS was originally set up as a two campus system having an East Campus at the former Cedar Ridge site containing Grades 9 and 10 and a West Campus at the former Madison Central site containing Grades 11 and 12. The entire high school is now located at the former Cedar Ridge High School (East Campus) and Carl Sandburg Middle School Building after an addition was added in 2004. The former Middle School building houses the Grade Nine Center.

James Hickey was hired in 2003 and he oversaw a $26.8 million high school construction project that was completed in September 2005. The school developed a stricter but better learning environment as shown through student achievement and standardized test scores which have exceeded state standards. Out-of-school suspensions dropped more than 55% and student tardiness dropped by more than 60%, while scores on state exams rose more than 20% in mathematics and more than 10% in language arts literacy. For his work in transforming Old Bridge High School, Dr. Hickey was recognized as the New Jersey Principal of the Year in 2009.

== Awards, recognition and rankings ==
The school was the 158th-ranked public high school in New Jersey out of 339 schools statewide in New Jersey Monthly magazine's September 2014 cover story on the state's "Top Public High Schools", using a new ranking methodology. The school had been ranked 178th in the state of 328 schools in 2012, after being ranked 162nd in 2010 out of 322 schools listed. The magazine ranked the school 211th in 2008 out of 316 schools. The school was ranked 197th of 316 schools in the magazine's 2006 rankings.

Schooldigger.com ranked the school 169th out of 381 public high schools statewide in its 2011 rankings (a decrease of 45 positions from the 2010 ranking) which were based on the combined percentage of students classified as proficient or above proficient on the mathematics (81.0%) and language arts literacy (93.6%) components of the High School Proficiency Assessment (HSPA).

== Athletics ==
The Old Bridge High School Knights compete in the Greater Middlesex Conference, which is comprised of public and private high schools located in the Middlesex County area and operates under the supervision of the New Jersey State Interscholastic Athletic Association. With 2,082 students in grades 10–12, the school was classified by the NJSIAA for the 2019–20 school year as Group IV for most athletic competition purposes, which included schools with an enrollment of 1,060 to 5,049 students in that grade range. The football team competes in Division 5C of the Big Central Football Conference, which includes 60 public and private high schools in Hunterdon, Middlesex, Somerset, Union and Warren counties, which are broken down into 10 divisions by size and location. The school was classified by the NJSIAA as Group V South for football for 2024–2026, which included schools with 1,333 to 2,324 students.

The ice hockey team won the Handchen Cup in 1998 and the Dowd Cup in 2006. The 1998 team won the Handchen Cup with a 5–4 win against Toms River High School East in the championship game played at South Mountain Arena.

The boys' cross country running team won the Group IV state championship in 2001, 2004, 2006, 2008 and 2015. The girls cross country running team won the Group IV state championship in 2001.

The boys' wrestling team won the Central Jersey Group IV state sectional championships in 2001 and 2002.

In 2001, the Knights football team, went on to play at High Point Solutions Stadium in the Central Jersey Group IV title game, losing to an undefeated J.P. Stevens High School team 14–7. In 2015, the Knights football team made a second appearance in the Central Jersey Group V title game, falling to an undefeated South Brunswick High School by a score of 42–0 in the tournament final. In 2018, Old Bridge and East Brunswick High School played their 25th and final Thanksgiving Day game, with Old Bridge winning 22 of the 25 games in the series. The two schools will continue to have a "Battle of Route 18" rivalry game that will be played as part of the regular schedule.

The boys' track team won the Group IV indoor relay state championship in 2002 and 2010.

The boys' track team won the Group IV spring / outdoor track state championship in 2005, 2006 and 2016.

The boys' track team won the indoor track Group IV state championship in 2008 and 2016.

In 2008, the softball team went to win the Red Division title for the second year in succession, the Greater Middlesex Conference championship, and the Central Jersey Group IV sectional championship with a 2–1 win against Hunterdon Central Regional High School.

In 2012, the girls' soccer team completed the most successful soccer year in school history when they made the finals in the Central Jersey Group IV title game, losing 6–0 to Montgomery High School.

The boys volleyball team won the overall state championship in 2018 (defeating Southern Regional High School in the final match of the tournament) and 2019 (vs. Fair Lawn High School). In 2018, the team won the school's first Tournament of Champions title in any sport with a win in the finals against Southern Regional. The team repeated as state champion in 2019 with a win in three sets in the finals against Fair Lawn High School. In June 2022, the team lost the first set and came back to win 2–1 against Southern to earn their fourth consecutive ToC title.

The baseball team had a school-record 23 wins in 2019 and won its first Greater Middlesex Conference title since 2011 with a 3–1 win in the finals against South Brunswick High School. In 2023, the team won the Central Jersey Group IV sectional title and reached its first state title game in school history but lost the Group IV championship by a score of 4–0 to Ridgewood High School.

== Marching Knights ==
The Old Bridge Marching Knights, also known as the OBHSMK, have been recognized as a competitive marching band for the past and have gained high ranks in multiple marching band circuits. In 2005, the Marching Knights gained a Silver-medal finalist position in the Tournament of Bands' Group III 2005 Atlantic Coast Championship with their show Wild Knights. Their show Metamorphosis was ranked fourth place in the same competition in 2006 with a score of 95.00, making them a Gold-medal finalist.

Eventually, they were ranked fourth in the 2009 season in their USSBA circuit, with The Dark Knight. In the 2010 season, the Marching Knights placed sixth in group IV with the theme Requiem for a Knightmare. In the 2011 season, with the show In Motion, the Marching Knights ranked sixth in Group III and tied for Best Music. The Marching Knights were six-tenths of a point away from first place.

The Old Bridge Marching Knights participated at the D-Day Anniversary Parade in Normandy, France in June 2015 as one of five American bands participating in the ceremonies marking the 70th anniversary of the D-Day landings. The band performed in the annual parade in Sainte-Mère-Église.

After winning the USBands Group 3 Open state championship, the band traveled to Honolulu, Hawaii, in December 2018 to represent the state and the USS New Jersey in the Pearl Harbor anniversary parade.

== Administration ==
The school's principals are Sally Fazio for the main campus and James Oliveri for the Ellen McDermott Grade Nine Center (GNC). Core members of the school's administration are the school's three vice principals.

== Notable alumni ==
Notable alumni of Old Bridge High School and its predecessors (Cedar Ridge and Madison Central high schools) include:

- Adam Chazen (born 1986, class of 2004), special effects producer, best known for his work on the cable television series Game of Thrones, for which he has received five Emmy Awards
- Steve Corodemus (born 1952, class of 1970), politician who served in the New Jersey General Assembly from 1992 to 2008, where he represented the 11th Legislative District
- Quinton Crawford (born 1990), assistant coach for the Los Angeles Lakers of the NBA
- Junot Díaz (born 1968, class of 1987), Pulitzer Prize-winning author
- Doug Emhoff (born 1964) is an American lawyer who was the second gentleman of the United States from 2021 to 2025
- Mikey Erg, punk rock drummer for The Ergs!
- Owen Henry (born 1959), politician who represents the 12th legislative district in the New Jersey Senate since January 2024
- Phil Ivey (born 1976), professional poker player
- Ken Leung (born 1970), actor, known for character Miles on Lost
- Caren Lissner (born 1972, class of 1989), novelist
- Fabian Nicieza (born 1961, class of 1979), writer and co-creator of Deadpool for Marvel Comics
- Brian O'Halloran (born 1969, class of 1987), actor famous for his role as Dante in the 1994 Kevin Smith movie Clerks
- Cameron Richardson (born 1979, class of 1997), actress, star of Alvin and the Chipmunks
- Mark Schlissel (born 1957, class of 1975), president of the University of Michigan
- Anthony Seratelli, (born 1983, class of 2001), professional baseball player
- Artur Sitkowski (born 2000), American football coach for the Illinois Fighting Illini
- Shannon Sohn (born 1974, class of 1992), traffic reporter, WABC-TV
- Tammy Lynn Sytch (born 1972, class of 1990), professional wrestler
- Vitamin C (born 1969, class of 1987), singer/actress, known for her "Graduation (Friends Forever)" song
