= Old Bridge Township Public Schools =

School district in Middlesex County, New Jersey, US

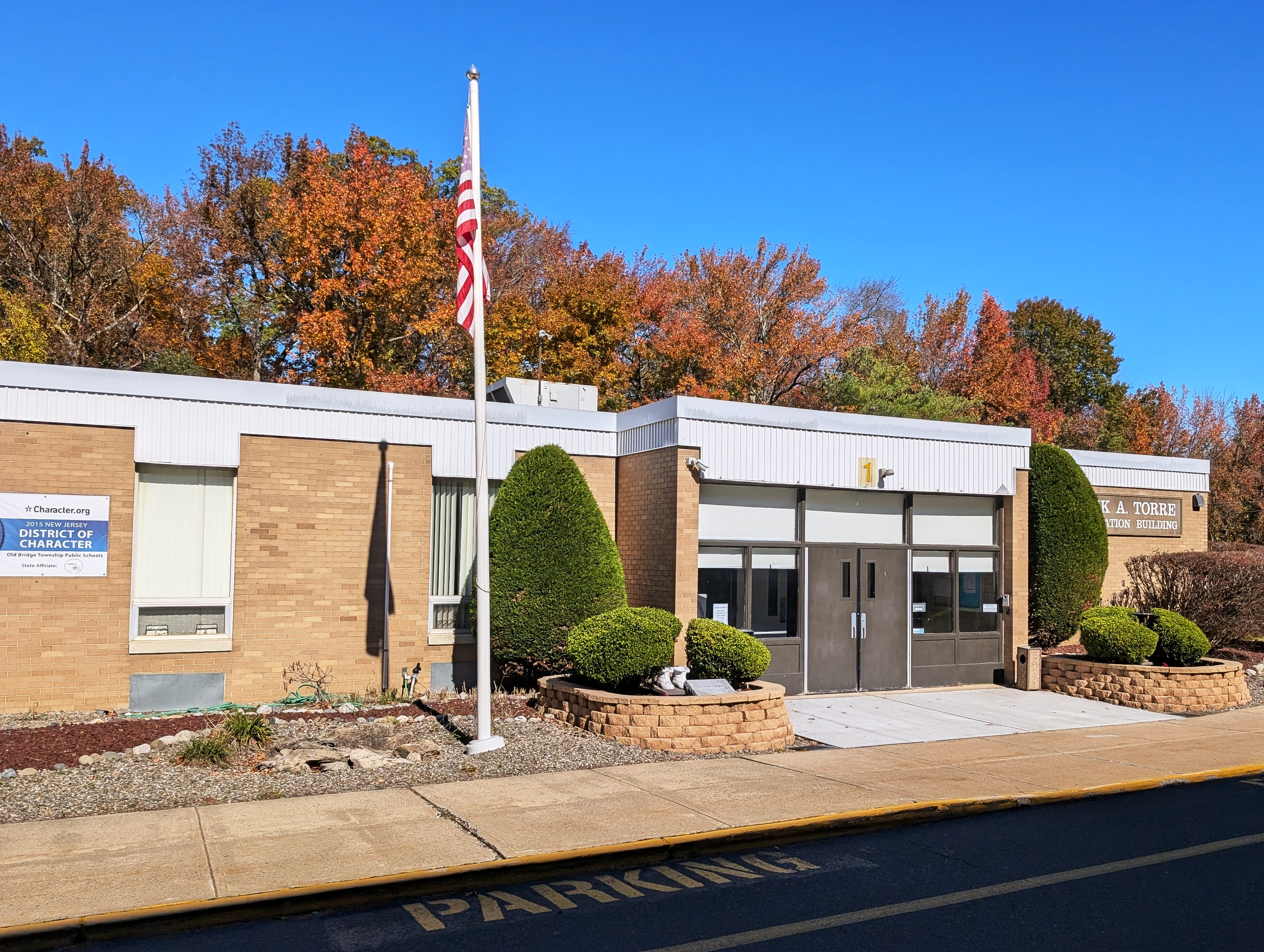
- District offices

Address
- 4207 Highway 516 Matawan, Middlesex County, New Jersey, 07747; United States
- Coordinates: 40.411042°N 74.239377°W

District information
- Grades: K-12
- Superintendent: Vincent Sasso
- Business administrator: David Weidele
- Schools: 14

Students and staff
- Enrollment: 8,096 (as of 2022–23)
- Faculty: 670.5 FTEs
- Student–teacher ratio: 12.1:1

Other information
- District Factor Group: FG
- Website: www.oldbridgeadmin.org
Ind.	Per pupil	District spending	Rank (*)	K-12 average	%± vs. average
1A	Total Spending	$17,018	27	$18,891	−9.9%
1	Budgetary Cost	13,575	35	14,783	−8.2%
2	Classroom Instruction	8,571	47	8,763	−2.2%
6	Support Services	1,793	20	2,392	−25.0%
8	Administrative Cost	1,254	21	1,485	−15.6%
10	Operations & Maintenance	1,638	54	1,783	−8.1%
13	Extracurricular Activities	214	37	268	−20.1%
16	Median Teacher Salary	66,720	62	64,043
Data from NJDoE 2014 Taxpayers' Guide to Education Spending. *Of K-12 districts with more than 3,500 students. Lowest spending=1; Highest=103

The Old Bridge Township Public Schools is a comprehensive community public school district that serves students in kindergarten through twelfth grade from Old Bridge Township, in Middlesex County, in the U.S. state of New Jersey.

As of the 2022–23 school year, the district, comprised of 14 schools, had an enrollment of 8,096 students and 670.5 classroom teachers (on an FTE basis), for a student–teacher ratio of 12.1:1.

The district is classified by the New Jersey Department of Education as being in District Factor Group "FG", the fourth-highest of eight groupings. District Factor Groups organize districts statewide to allow comparison by common socioeconomic characteristics of the local districts. From lowest socioeconomic status to highest, the categories are A, B, CD, DE, FG, GH, I and J.

== History ==
Old Bridge High School opened in September 1994. It was formed from the merger of Cedar Ridge High School and Madison Central High School, which were the two existing high schools in Old Bridge Township.

In 2026 the school district plans to change the attendance boundaries of the elementary school. All students at Cooper Elementary will be moved to other schools.

== Awards and recognition ==
Cheesequake Elementary School was one of nine public schools recognized in 2017 as Blue Ribbon Schools by the United States Department of Education.

== Schools ==
Schools in the district (with 2022–23 enrollment data from the National Center for Education Statistics) are:

Elementary schools

- M. Scott Carpenter Elementary School with 226 students in grades K–5
- Leroy Gordon Cooper Elementary School (196; K–5)
- Virgil I. Grissom Elementary School (182; K–5)
- Madison Park Elementary School (285; K–5)
- James A. McDivitt Elementary School (532; K–5)
- Memorial Elementary School (417; K–5)
- William A. Miller Elementary School (332; K–5)
- Walter M. Schirra Elementary School (269; K–5)
- Alan B. Shepard Elementary School (280; K–5)
- Southwood Elementary School (343; K–5)
- Raymond E. Voorhees Elementary School (394; K–5)

Middle schools

- Jonas Salk Middle School (903; 6–8)
- Carl Sandburg Middle School (981; 6–8)

High school

- Old Bridge High School (2,707; 9–12)

=== Former schools ===
- Cheesequake Elementary School was the oldest building in the district. The district felt that the building did not have sufficient parking. In 2019 it had 280 students and 25 staff. In January 2019, the district announced it would likely close the school after the State of New Jersey reduced funding. The district blamed the school's closure on the state's reduction of $12 million in state aid over a five-year period. The Cheesequake closure would cut annual district spending by $750,000. It closed in 2019. Schools that took former Cheesequake students were Madison Park, McDivitt, Memorial and Shepard. In 2020, the Sayreville Public Schools planned to rent the facilities temporarily after the closure.

== Administration ==
Core members of the district's administration are:

- Vincent Sasso, superintendent
- David Weidele, business administrator and board secretary

David Cittadino left to become the superintendent in Wayne in 2025. Bernard Bragen Jr. served as Interim Superintendent from September 1 to December 1, 2025. He had been the superintendent of the Montgomery County Public Schools in Virginia, and before that was the superintendent of the Edison Township Public Schools in New Jersey. Sasso became the district's superintendent after previously being the principal of Old Bridge High School.

== Board of education ==
The district's board of education, comprised of nine members, sets policy and oversees the fiscal and educational operation of the district through its administration. As a Type II school district, the board's trustees are elected directly by voters to serve three-year terms of office on a staggered basis, with three seats up for election each year held (since 2012) as part of the November general election. The board appoints a superintendent to oversee the district's day-to-day operations and a business administrator to supervise the business functions of the district.
