= Carrie Pilby (film) =

2016 film by Susan Johnson

- Theatrical release poster
- Directed by: Susan Johnson
- Screenplay by: Kara Holden; Dean Craig
- Based on: Carrie Pilby by Caren Lissner
- Produced by: Susan Johnson; Susan Cartsonis; Suzanne Farwell; Lisa Wolofsky; Brent Emery
- Starring: Bel Powley; Vanessa Bayer; Colin O'Donoghue; William Moseley; Jason Ritter; Gabriel Byrne; Nathan Lane
- Cinematography: Gonzalo Amat
- Edited by: Phillip J. Bartell
- Music by: Michael Penn
- Production company: Braveart Films
- Distributed by: The Orchard
- Release dates: September 9, 2016 (TIFF); March 31, 2017 (United States)
- Running time: 98 minutes
- Country: United States
- Language: English

Carrie Pilby is a 2016 American comedy-drama film directed by Susan Johnson and written by Kara Holden and Dean Craig, based on the best-selling novel of the same name by Caren Lissner. The film stars Bel Powley, Nathan Lane, Gabriel Byrne, Jason Ritter, William Moseley, Vanessa Bayer, and Colin O'Donoghue. Principal photography began on December 14, 2015, in New York City.

It was screened in the Special Presentations section at the 2016 Toronto International Film Festival. The film was given a limited release on March 31, 2017, before being released through video on demand on April 4, 2017, by The Orchard. It debuted on Netflix on September 5, 2017.

== Plot ==
Carrie Pilby is a 19-year-old child prodigy living alone in New York City. She is always the smartest person in the room but too unhappy to enjoy it. With difficulty interacting, she has trouble dating and making friends, but she always has something to say. And while she can analyze everything, regardless of the situation, she has more difficulty understanding herself.

Carrie asks her therapist, Dr. Petrov, in a weekly session why so much emphasis is placed on happiness. "There are some brilliant, unhappy people." But the therapist, a longtime friend of Carrie's absent and widowed father, is very aware of how unique she is. Originally from London, Carrie has lived in NYC since she was 12, when her mother passed and now by herself in Manhattan. She skipped three grades, graduating from Harvard University at 18. A year later, she works for a law firm as a proofreader at her dad's insistence, but doesn't really need the job.

Carrie's clearly lonely and feels odd, despite outward appearances. She has spent the past year largely hiding in her apartment and seeing Dr. Petrov. So, he makes her a to-do list to help her emerge from her self-isolation, "Give humanity a chance" and find joy in her life: Get a job. Make a friend. Get a pet. Go on a date. Do something you enjoyed as a child.

Her adventures include a blind date with an engaged guy, friendship with an extroverted but kind co-worker and "the guy next door", whom she meets while he's playing a didgeridoo in the alley behind their apartment building. They eventually get to know each other through a walk-and-talk around the city.

There are occasional flashbacks to Carrie's abusive relationship with her English professor when she was just 16. These serious scenes help explain her contradictions: intellectual wisdom beyond her years combined with a teen's emotional immaturity.

As Carrie starts to fulfill the list, her views on sex, romance and the world begin to change as well as how she sees relationships and humanity.

== Cast ==
- Bel Powley as Carrie Pilby
- Vanessa Bayer as Tara
- Colin O'Donoghue as David Harrison
- William Moseley as Cy
- Jason Ritter as Matt
- Desmin Borges as Douglas
- Poorna Jagannathan as Fliss
- Nathan Lane as Dr. Petrov
- Gabriel Byrne as Mr. Pilby

== Production ==
On June 17, 2013, it was announced that Braveart Films' producer Susan Johnson would make her directorial debut with the adaptation of Caren Lissner's coming-of-age novel. The film would be produced by Suzanne Farwell and Susan Cartsonis of Storefront Pictures. Hailee Steinfeld was previously attached to play the titular role in the film, whose script was written by Kara Holden and Dean Craig. Steinfeld dropped out due to scheduling conflicts and was replaced by Bel Powley. Similarly, Eddie Izzard was cast as Dr. Petrov, but the role later went to Nathan Lane, while Tom Wilkinson was cast to play Carrie's father, but was later replaced by Gabriel Byrne. Jason Ritter and Vanessa Bayer both joined the cast in April 2015.

Articles about the film noted its largely female production team, female head writer and female director.

Principal photography on the film began on December 14, 2015, in New York City.

== Release ==
The film had its world premiere at the Toronto International Film Festival on September 9, 2016. In November 2016, The Orchard acquired US distribution rights to the film. The film was given limited release on March 31, 2017, in six theaters, and then became available through video on demand on April 4, 2017. The film was the most-watched iTunes film in the independent films category for the first three weeks of its release, then held third place during the fourth week.

== Reception ==
On the review aggregation website Rotten Tomatoes, the film has an approval rating of 65% based on 26 reviews, with an average rating of 5.80/10, and a Critics Consensus that states, "Carrie Pilby is rough around the edges but very endearing as Bel Powley delivers a compelling performance that's often enough to push past contrived notions." On Metacritic, the film has a weighted average score of 52 out of 100 based on reviews from 14 critics, indicating "mixed or average" reviews.
