= East Brunswick High School =

High school in Middlesex County, New Jersey, US

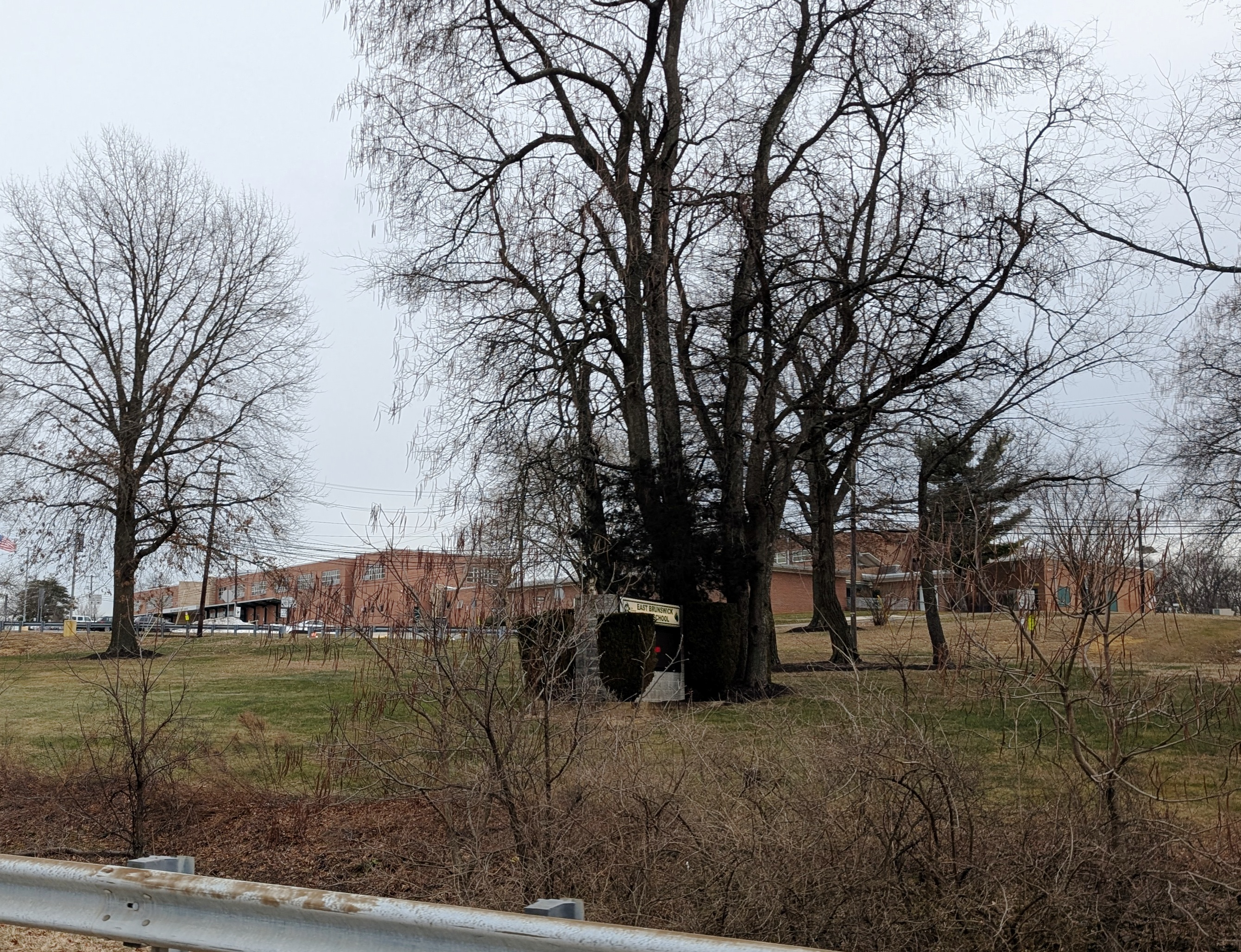
- Front of the school from CR 535

Location
- 380 Cranbury Road; East Brunswick, Middlesex County, New Jersey 08816; United States; 40.43395°N 74.400468°W

Information
- Type: Public high school
- Motto: "Excellence With Honor and Integrity"
- Established: 1958
- School district: East Brunswick Public Schools
- NCES School ID: 340411003294
- Principal: Edward J. Bucior
- Faculty: 162.9 FTEs
- Grades: 10-12
- Enrollment: 2,124 (as of 2024–25)
- Student to teacher ratio: 13.0:1
- Colors: Green and white
- Athletics: 25 teams
- Athletics conference: Greater Middlesex Conference (general); Big Central Football Conference (football)
- Mascot: "Bruiser" the Bear
- Team name: Bears
- Accreditation: Middle States Association of Colleges and Schools
- Newspaper: The Clarion
- Yearbook: Emerald
- Website: hs.ebnet.org

East Brunswick High School is a comprehensive public high school serving students in grades ten through twelve in East Brunswick township, Middlesex County, in the U.S. state of New Jersey. It operates as part of East Brunswick Public Schools. The school motto is "Excellence with Honor and Integrity."

The school has been accredited by the Middle States Association of Colleges and Schools Commission on Elementary and Secondary Schools since 1965; the school's accreditation expires in July 2030.

As of the 2024–25 school year, the school had an enrollment of 2,124 students and 162.9 classroom teachers (on an FTE basis), for a student–teacher ratio of 13.0:1. There were 402 students (18.9% of enrollment) eligible for free lunch and 111 (5.2% of students) eligible for reduced-cost lunch.

== History ==
East Brunswick High School opened for the 1958–59 school year. Previously, students living in the Township had attended South River High School in neighboring South River. In that first year, the school housed grades six, seven, eight and nine. Those four classes occupied the school until June 1962, when the original 9th graders became its first graduating class and the school contained grades nine through twelve. Because the school exceeded its intended capacity of 1,700 students, freshmen were dropped into the town's two junior high schools in 1967, later one junior high school. Enrollment reached a peak of about 2,600 in 1973. By 1990, the school had fewer than 2,000 students, falling to around 1,700 by 1997.

Additions to the school were built in 1965, 1970 and 2001, in efforts to ease overcrowding. The 2001 expansion included a second level of classrooms, over the administrative offices; a corridor connecting three "buildings" that had previously been connected only by a covered outdoor walkway; and expanded facilities for the cafeteria, library, arts and athletic departments.

The school day at East Brunswick High School used to begin at 7:26 am and ended at 2:12 pm. Initiated in the 2022-23 school year, school now begins at 8:00 am and ends at 2:45pm. It operates its daily bell schedule on an 8-period "block schedule" system (4 83-minute periods per day), with an additional homeroom period occurring between the 2nd, and 3rd class period of each day.

At the beginning of the 2005–06 school year, the school instituted an ID system where the students must wear their IDs at all times as part of security measures. In 2018, following a series of incidents at schools nationwide led the district to add armed police officers to patrol the school.

== Awards, recognition and rankings ==
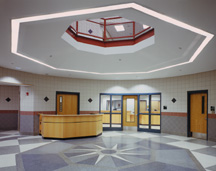
First Floor Lobby Of EBHS

East Brunswick High School was awarded the Blue Ribbon School Award of Excellence by the United States Department of Education, the highest award an American school can receive, during the 1990–91 school year.

In the 2014 "America's Top High School", Newsweek ranked the school 130th overall in the nation.

In its 2013 report on "America's Best High Schools", The Daily Beast ranked the school 484th among participating public high schools and 41st among schools in New Jersey.

In the 2012 "Ranking America's High Schools" issue by The Washington Post, the school was ranked 45th in New Jersey, after being ranked 48th statewide in 2011. In the May 22, 2007, issue of Newsweek, ranking the country's top high schools, East Brunswick High School was listed in 997th place, the 30th-highest ranked school in New Jersey. The school was ranked 886th in the May 8, 2006, issue of Newsweek, listing the "Top 1,200 High Schools in The United States".

For the 1996–97 school year, East Brunswick High School was named a "Star School" by the New Jersey Department of Education, the highest honor that a New Jersey school can achieve.

In the April 1996 issue, the high school was cited as best in the state by Redbook magazine.

During the 2001–02 school year, East Brunswick High School's Intergenerational Program was honored by the Best Practices Program in the state of New Jersey.

The school was the 47th-ranked public high school in New Jersey out of 339 schools statewide in New Jersey Monthly magazine's September 2014 cover story on the state's "Top Public High Schools", using a new ranking methodology. The school had been ranked 121st in the state of 328 schools in 2012, after being ranked 71st in 2010 out of 322 schools listed. The magazine ranked the school 76th in 2008 out of 316 schools. The school was ranked 60th in the magazine's September 2006 issue, which included 316 schools across the state.

The Schooldigger.com website ranked the school tied for 109th out of 381 public high schools statewide in its 2011 rankings (a decrease of 35 positions from the 2010 ranking) which were based on the combined percentage of students classified as proficient or above proficient on the mathematics (87.9%) and language arts literacy (94.4%) components of the High School Proficiency Assessment (HSPA).

== Curriculum and grading ==
In addition to regular, honors, and Advanced Placement classes, the curriculum includes numerous electives in humanities, business, visual arts, music, drama, family and consumer science, and technology education. Two Cooperative Education programs are available, as well as a shared time program at the East Brunswick campus of the Middlesex County Vocational and Technical High Schools.

The Board of Education changed the grading system to a "quality point" type of system where grades are equal to a number (GPA) and the GPA from the four quarters plus midterms (and/or finals) are averaged as well. Grade Point Average calculations are weighted three different ways: Standard scale, Honors Scale and AP scale. The Honors Scale transposes GPA values to their respective letter grades by a factor of 1.15, while the AP scale transposes by a factor of 1.25.

== Extracurricular activities ==
East Brunswick High School offers a full range of clubs and events. The school has achieved success in the national We the People: The Citizen and the Constitution competition, for which it won the national title in 1998, and then again three years in a row from 2004 to 2006. The team was the state champion in 2019–20. Through 2005, the team won the We The People state competition in 17 of the program's first 18 years.

== Athletics ==
The East Brunswick High School Bears compete in the Greater Middlesex Conference, which is comprised of public and private high schools in the Middlesex County area and operates under the supervision of the New Jersey State Interscholastic Athletic Association. With 2,080 students in grades 10–12, the school was classified by the NJSIAA for the 2019–20 school year as Group IV for most athletic competition purposes, which included schools with an enrollment of 1,060 to 5,049 students in that grade range. The football team competes in Division 5C of the Big Central Football Conference, which includes 60 public and private high schools in Hunterdon, Middlesex, Somerset, Union and Warren counties, which are broken down into 10 divisions by size and location. The school was classified by the NJSIAA as Group V South for football for 2024–2026, which included schools with 1,333 to 2,324 students.

The school participates as the host school / lead agency for a joint ice hockey team with South River High School and Spotswood High School. The co-op program operates under agreements scheduled to expire at the end of the 2023–24 school year.

The wrestling team won the Central Jersey Group IV state championship in 1985.

The girls soccer team won the Group IV state championship in 1986 (against Westfield High School in the finals), 1987 (vs. Westfield), 1989 (vs. Westfield), 1990 (as co-champion with Bayonne High School), 1992 (vs. Westfield), 1994 (vs. Randolph High School), 1996 (vs. Westfield), 2001 (vs. Clifton High School). The program's eight state titles are tied for sixth-most in the state. A goal scored in the last minute of play in regulation gave the 1986 team a 1–0 win against Westfield in the Group IV championship game and a 25–0 record for the season. The 2001 team finished the season with a 20–2 record after winning the Group IV title with a 1–0 win against Clifton in the championship game played at The College of New Jersey on a goal scored by Heather O'Reilly, her 38th that year. From 1979 to 2019, the Bears won 36 of the 41 times the Middlesex County Tournament was played, including 21 consecutive championships from 1980 to 2000, with their only finals losses coming in 1979, 2002 and 2015 in addition to missing the finals in two other seasons. The Bears won five consecutive Greater Middlesex Conference Tournament titles, including a 2–1 victory over Old Bridge in 2007 and a 3–0 win over Bishop Ahr in 2008.

East Brunswick won the Group IV state boys tennis championship in 1992 (defeating Livingston High School in the final match of the tournament), 2004 (vs. Bridgewater-Raritan High School), 2021 (vs. Bergen County Technical High School), and 2022 (vs. Westfield High School). The team won the inaugural Tournament of Champions in 1992 against runner-up Newark Academy, and were ToC finalists in 2004, 2021, and 2022. In 2022, the team completed a clean sweep of the GMC tournament, winning all five flights as part of the most dominant run in tournament history.

The boys' bowling team won the overall state championship in 1997, and the Group IV title in 2017 and 2018. The team won the Group IV state championship and the overall Tournament of Champions in 2017.

The boys volleyball team won the overall state championship in 1999 (defeating St. Joseph High School of Metuchen in the final match of the tournament), 2000 (vs. Lakeland Regional High School), 2001 (vs. Clifton High School), 2003 (vs. St. Joseph's of Metuchen), 2004 (vs. Fair Lawn High School) and 2007 (vs. St. Peter's Preparatory School). The program's five state titles are ranked third in the state. The team won the 2007 NJSIAA South Jersey sectional championship with a 25–19, 31–29 victory over Southern Regional High School. The team went on to win the overall state title, defeating St. Peter's Preparatory School, 25–21, 25–22.

The girls basketball team won the Group IV state championship in 1999, defeating Columbia High School by a score of 63–57 in the tournament final and advanced to the Tournament of Champions as the third seed, beating sixth-seed Paterson Catholic High School 58–43 in the first round before falling to number-two West Morris Mendham High School 71–40 in the semifinals to finish the season with a 28–4 record.

The football team won the Central Jersey Group IV state sectional championships in 2004 and 2009. The team won their first playoff-era title with a 17–12 win against Jackson High School in the finals of the Central Jersey Group IV tournament. East Brunswick won the Central Jersey Group IV state sectional title in the 2009 season, defeating Brick Memorial High School by a score of 9–0, earning the program its first sectional championship since 2004. In 2018, East Brunswick and Old Bridge High School played their 25th and final Thanksgiving Day game, with Old Bridge winning 22 of the 25 games. The series started after Cedar Ridge High School and Madison Central High School, which had played their own Thanksgiving Day game, were merged in 1994 to create Old Bridge High School. The two schools will continue to have a "Battle of Route 18" that will be played as part of the regular schedule.

The girls tennis team won the Group IV state championship in 2006 (against J. P. Stevens High School in the final match of the tournament), 2008 (vs. Cherry Hill High School East) and 2019 (vs. Livingston High School). The team won the Tournament of Champions in 2008 (against runner-up Millburn High School) and 2019 (vs. Moorestown Friends School). After winning their second Group IV championship in 2008, the girls' tennis team won the Tournament of Champions, defeating Millburn High School and ending that school's streak of winning 98 consecutive matches. The girls' tennis team won the Greater Middlesex Conference title for nine consecutive years from 2006 to 2014.

The girls' bowling team won the Group IV title in the 2008 season, after bowling a 1077 in the state final.

The boys track team won the spring / outdoor track state championship in Group IV in 2010 (as co-champion) and 2022.

The boys track team won the indoor relay championship in Group IV in 2011.

== Controversies ==
Football coach prayer controversy

On October 7, 2005, shortly after being informed by then-Superintendent of Schools Jo Ann Magistro that he would not be permitted to join his football team in prayer as he had done in the past and that some parents had complained about the prayers, East Brunswick High School coach Marcus Borden resigned from his position. Borden, also a tenured Spanish teacher, had by then had a 23-year career with East Brunswick Public Schools. District spokeswoman Trish LaDuca told the East Brunswick newspaper Home News Tribune that a "representative of the school district cannot constitutionally initiate prayer, encourage it or lead it."

The East Brunswick football team lost its game in a shutout on the day Borden resigned. Following Borden's resignation, nearly 100 players, parents, and coaches arrived at his house on a rainy day pleading for his return. Borden agreed and received pro bono legal representation the next week. He filed a lawsuit against the district on November 23 alleging that it was violating his constitutional rights; lawyer Ronald Riccio represented Borden.

Judge Dennis M. Cavanaugh of the United States District Court for the District of New Jersey ruled on July 26, 2006, that Borden could bow his head and bend his knee if the team captains (i.e., students) led the players in prayer. However, this decision was overturned on April 15, 2008, by a unanimous decision in the United States Court of Appeals for the Third Circuit, in which Judge D. Michael Fisher concluded that "a reasonable observer would conclude that he is continuing to endorse religion when he bows his head during the pre-meal grace and takes a knee with his team in the locker room while they pray."

School shooting threat in 2007

In May 2007, a 16-year-old male student from EBHS posted a school shooting threat on the internet and was arrested on Monday morning before school once people had noticed it. After investigating the student's home, no weapons were found inside and police determined it was only a hoax.

Forgery incident

In February 2019, a student from EBHS forged a letter on social media and in a bathroom at the school that had the signature of Superintendent Victor Valeski on it. The forged letter stated that Valeski tried smoking (vaping) an e-cigarette/juul and liked it and as a result, had decided to reverse and replace a vaping policy in which the new policy would allow students to vape in the bathroom/on school grounds only once with no consequences, but after being caught using it a second time, would face a suspension. After this forged letter was found, Valeski said the student would likely be suspended but not face any criminal charges.

Student fights a Muslim student

In April 2019, a female white student pulled off a hijab (headscarf) of a female Muslim student in a physical fight in the student lounge. The female white student was criminally charged and arrested with simple assault and harassment after an investigation by the East Brunswick Police Department and the Middlesex County Prosecutor's Office. Despite this, she was not charged with a bias or hate crime. The Muslim student was not charged with anything, although she was disciplined along with the female white student and both girls were absent from school the next day. The video of the fight quickly went viral online and on social media.

Yearbook incident

In 2024, the school faced controversy after a yearbook photo of the school's Jewish Student Union was altered to include pictures of Muslim students, causing significant backlash from the community. The district responded by halting the distribution of yearbooks, initiating an investigation, and planning to reprint affected pages. The independent investigation found that the mishap was an error, and not intended maliciously.

== Administration ==
The high school's principal is Edward J. Bucior. His administration team includes three assistant principals, one for each grade level. Bucior succeeded Michael Vinella, who announced that he would be retiring, effective March 2024.

== Notable alumni ==
- Michael Barkann (born 1960, class of 1978), television personality, NBC Sports Philadelphia, USA Network
- Amir Bell (born 1996, class of 2014), basketball player for Hapoel Be'er Sheva B.C. of the Israel Basketball Premier League
- Jeanie Bryson (born 1958), singer whose repertoire features jazz, pop and Latin music
- Dedrick Dodge (born 1967), safety for eight NFL seasons, from 1991 to 1998
- Hallie Eisenberg (born 1992), former child actress
- Jesse Eisenberg (born 1983), actor, whose films include The Squid and the Whale, Zombieland, The Social Network and Now You See Me
- Steven Fagin (class of 1985), diplomat
- Bryan Fortay (born 1971, class of 1989), former football quarterback who played for the Frankfurt Galaxy of the World League of American Football and the Miami Hooters of the Arena Football League
- Ghilene Joseph (born 1997), footballer who plays as a midfielder / forward for the Guyana women's national team
- Tomas Kalnoky (born 1980, class of 1997), singer and guitarist of Streetlight Manifesto and formerly Catch 22
- Joanne Lipman (born 1961), founding editor-in-chief of Conde Nast Portfolio and former deputy managing editor of The Wall Street Journal
- Sam Mattis (born 1994, class of 2012), Olympian track and field athlete who competes in the discus throw and set the high school state record with a throw of 218 feet 4 inches (66.55 m)
- Anne Milgram, (born 1970), attorney and academic who served as the 57th Attorney General of New Jersey
- Josh Miller (born 1970), NFL punter
- Adam Mitzner (born 1964, class of 1982), attorney and writer of legal thrillers
- Ari Ne'eman (born 1987), autism rights activist
- Heather O'Reilly (born 1985), soccer player for the US Women's National Team, FIFA Women's World Cup champion and three-time Olympic gold medalist
- Michael Seibel (born 1982, class of 2000), CEO of YCombinator
- Brian Selznick (born 1966, class of 1984), author and illustrator best known for his book The Invention of Hugo Cabret
- Glenn Slater (born 1968, class of 1986), multiple Tony Award nominated lyricist and collaborator with Alan Menken and Andrew Lloyd Webber
- Cenk Uygur (born 1970), radio talk show host of The Young Turks and columnist for The Huffington Post
- Jim Vallely (born 1954, class of 1972), Emmy Award-winning writer Golden Girls and Arrested Development
- Stefan Weisman (born 1970), composer
- Dave Wohl (born 1949), assistant general manager of the Boston Celtics
- Aaron Yoo (born 1979), actor who appeared in the films Disturbia and 21
