= Matzner =

Matzner may refer to:

- 35237 Matzner, a minor planet. See Meanings of minor planet names: 35001–36000#237
- Stefan Matzner (born 1993), Austrian track cyclist
- Caren Matzner or Caren Lissner, American novelist, essayist, and newspaper editor
- Richard Matzner, American physicist
