= Adam Mitzner =

American novelist (born 1964)

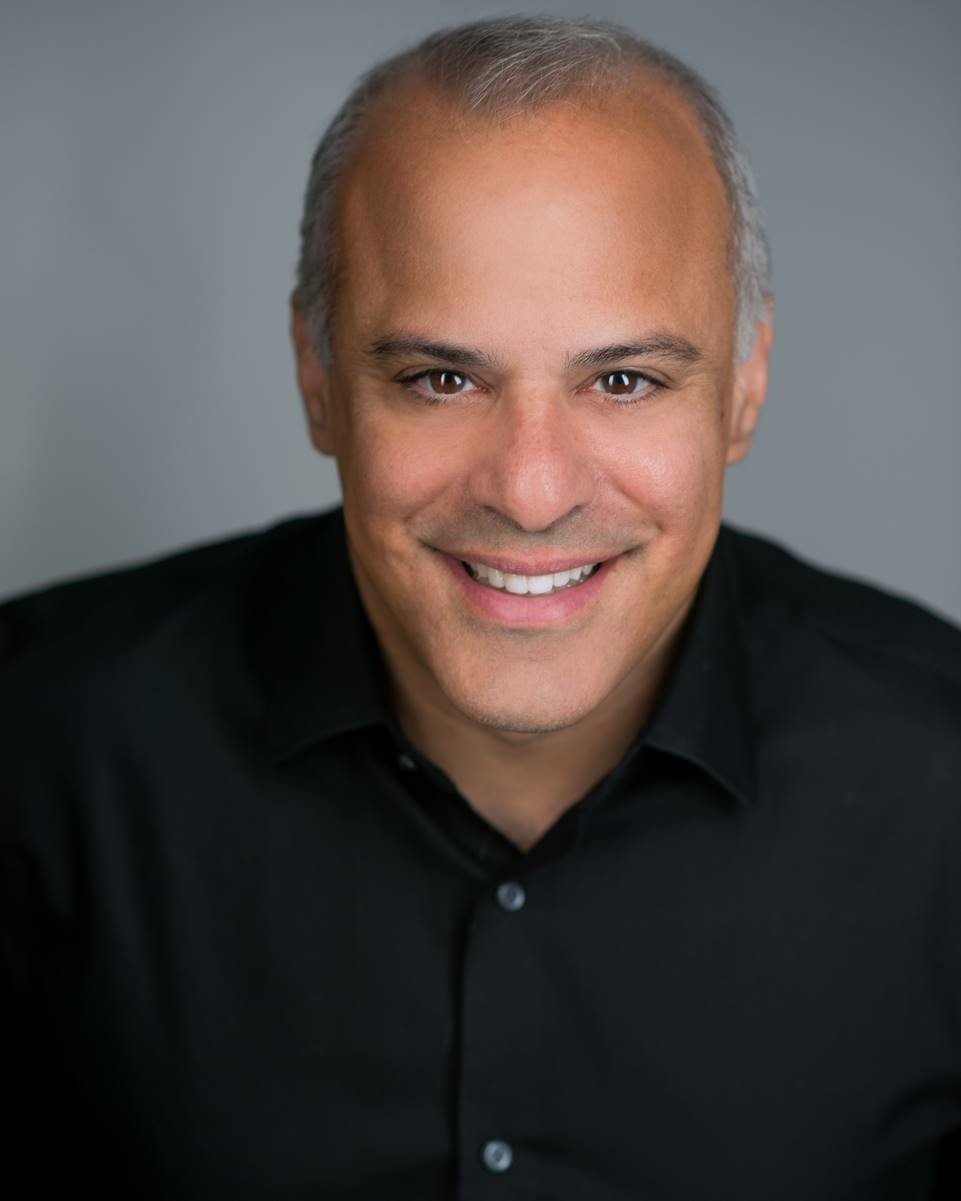
- Born: 1964 (age 61–62); New York City, U.S.
- Education: Brandeis University (BA, MA); University of Virginia School of Law
- Occupation: Novelist
- Writing career
- Genre: Thriller
- Website: adammitzner.com

Adam Mitzner (born 1964) is an American novelist and practicing attorney whose works primarily include legal thrillers and crime fiction.

== Early life ==
Mitzner was born in Brooklyn, New York, and grew up in East Brunswick, New Jersey. He is a 1982 graduate of East Brunswick High School, where he served as student council president.

Mitzner attended Brandeis University, where he received a B.A. and M.A. (Politics). He graduated from the University of Virginia School of Law in 1989.

== Career ==
Mitzner debut novel, A Conflict of Interest, was published in 2011 and was named one of Suspense Magazine's Best Books of the Year. The audiobook version reached number one on Audible on January 30, 2012.

In 2013, Mitzner released A Case of Redemption, which was the only literature nominee for the American Bar Association's Silver Gavel Award. This was followed by Losing Faith in April 2015 and The Girl from Home in April 2016.

In 2016, he signed a two-book deal with Thomas & Mercer. His first book with the publisher, Dead Certain, was published in June 2017. The novel became a number one Kindle bestseller and remained on Amazon charts for seven consecutive weeks.

On June 25, 2019, Mitzner published A Matter of Will. He continued the Broden Legal series with The Best Friend on April 14, 2020. Booklist described it as "a well-constructed, compelling legal thriller that deals perceptively with guilt and retribution, all set on a firm basis of love."

In 2021, he released The Perfect Marriage, a novel that delves into the complexities of relationships. The story follows James and Jessica Sommers as their pasts collide, testing their marriage with hidden agendas and revenge.

In 2023, Mitzner published Love Betrayal Murder, a legal thriller focusing on an office romance gone wrong. Bookreporter hailed it as his finest work yet, referring to it as "his own The Firm, if you will."

In 2024, The Brothers Kenney was published, a murder mystery that centers around former track star Sean Kenney, who returns home after years of estrangement to confront family secrets and unravel a devastating death.

== Bibliography ==
- The Brothers Kenney. Blackstone Publishing, Inc. 2024. ISBN 979-8212185912
- Love betrayal murder (First ed.).(2023). Ashland, OR: Blackstone Publishing. ISBN 9798212179867
- The perfect marriage. published by Thomas & Mercer. (2021) ISBN 978-1542005760
- The Best Friend (April 2020) published by Thomas & Mercer. ISBN 978-1542005753
- A Matter of Will (June 2019) published by Thomas & Mercer. ISBN 978-1503905139
- Never Goodbye ((April 2018)) published by Thomas & Mercer. ISBN 978-1542048378
- Dead Certain: A Novel (June 2017) published by Thomas & Mercer. ISBN 9781477822593
- The Girl From Home: A Thriller (April 2016) published by Gallery Books. ISBN 9781476764283
- Losing Faith (April 2015) published by Gallery Books. ISBN 9781476764245
- A Case of Redemption (May 2013) published by Pocket Books. ISBN 9781451674804
- A Conflict of Interest (May 2011) published by Gallery Books. ISBN 9781439157510
