= Madison Central High School =

Madison Central High School may refer to:

- Madison Central High School (Kentucky), a public high school in Kentucky
- Madison Central High School (Mississippi), a public high school in Mississippi
- Madison Central High School (New Jersey), a defunct public high school in New Jersey that was merged to create Old Bridge High School
- Madison Central High School (Wisconsin), a defunct public high school in Wisconsin
