= South Brunswick High School (New Jersey) =

High school in Middlesex County, New Jersey, US

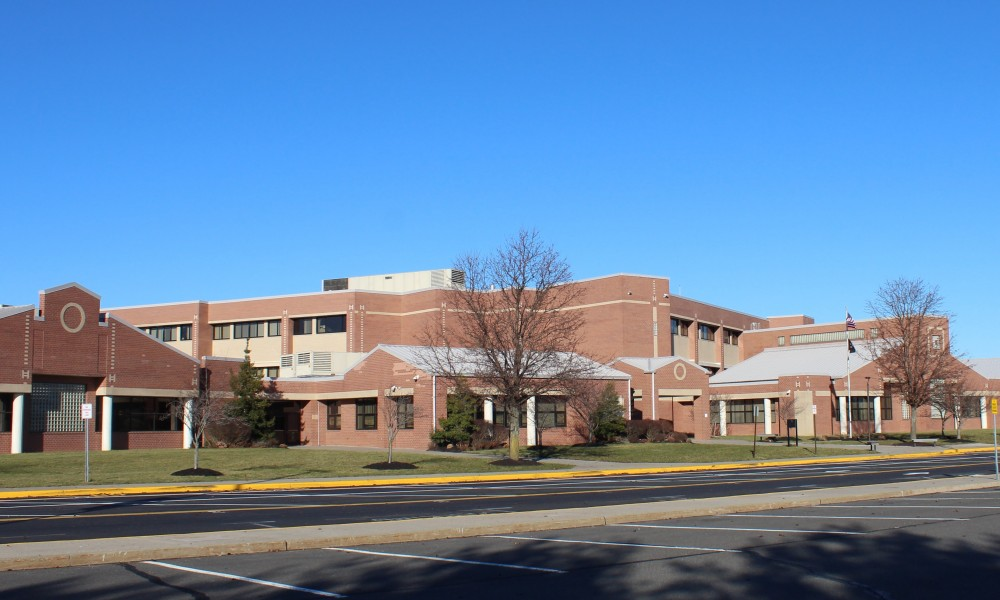

Location
- 750 Ridge Road; South Brunswick, Middlesex County, New Jersey 08852; United States; 40.372564°N 74.563463°W

Information
- Type: Public high school
- Established: 1960 (1997 current location)
- School district: South Brunswick Public Schools
- NCES School ID: 341521003610
- Principal: Peter Varela
- Faculty: 188.4 FTEs
- Grades: 9-12
- Enrollment: 2,666 (as of 2024–25)
- Student to teacher ratio: 14.2:1
Colors
Black and gold
- Athletics conference: Greater Middlesex Conference (general); Big Central Football Conference (football)
- Team name: Vikings
- Accreditation: Middle States Association of Colleges and Schools
- Newspaper: The Viking Vibe
- Website: sbhs.sbschools.org/o/sbhs

South Brunswick High School (SBHS) is a comprehensive community public high school serving students in grades nine through twelve at the school located in the Monmouth Junction section of South Brunswick, in Middlesex County, in the U.S. state of New Jersey, operating as the lone secondary school of the South Brunswick Public Schools. The school is accredited until January 2029 and has been accredited by the Middle States Association of Colleges and Schools Commission on Elementary and Secondary Schools since 1965.

As of the 2024–25 school year, the school had an enrollment of 2,666 students and 188.4 classroom teachers (on an FTE basis), for a student–teacher ratio of 14.2:1. There were 217 students (8.1% of enrollment) eligible for free lunch and 223 (8.4% of students) eligible for reduced-cost lunch. Based on 2021-22 data from the New Jersey Department of Education, it was the fourth-largest high school in the state and one of 28 schools with more than 2,000 students.

== History ==
Until 1960, students from South Brunswick attended Jamesburg High School, a relationship that was ended after the Jamesburg Public Schools announced that students from South Brunswick would not be admitted after 1959. A new school building was designed to accommodate an eventual enrollment of 1,000 and be constructed with the proceeds of a $1.8 million bond issue (equivalent to $20.1 million in 2025).

The first South Brunswick High School, located at the corner of Major Road and Kingston Lane, was dedicated in October 1960 with a crowd of 800 in attendance.

The current 360,000-square-foot (33,000 m^{2}) building was built in 1997 on an 80-acre (32 ha) campus at the corner of Stouts Lane and Ridge Road due to overcrowding issues and paid for as part of a $51 million project (the equal of $102.3 million in 2025). With the opening of the new high school facility, the original building was repurposed for grades 6-8 and is now Crossroads South Middle School. The annex which is connected by a two-level indoor bridge on levels 2 and 3 was built in 2003–04, on the side of Stouts Lane.

== Awards, recognition and rankings ==
For the 1990–91 school year, South Brunswick High School received the National Blue Ribbon School of Excellence Award from the United States Department of Education, the highest honor that an American school can achieve.

For the 2000–01 school year, South Brunswick High School was named a "Star School" by the New Jersey Department of Education, the highest honor that a New Jersey school can achieve.

In the 2010–11 school year, the South Brunswick High School was named the New Jersey School of Character, was ranked in the top 50 in the country and was selected as a final four finalist for being named the National School of Character of the 2010–11 school year.

The school was the 53rd-ranked public high school in New Jersey out of 339 schools statewide in New Jersey Monthly magazine's September 2014 cover story on the state's "Top Public High Schools", using a new ranking methodology. The school had been ranked 138th in the state of 328 schools in 2012, after being ranked 89th in 2010 out of 322 schools listed. The magazine ranked the school 74th in 2008 out of 316 schools. The school was ranked 75th in the magazine's September 2006 issue, which included 316 schools across the state. Schooldigger.com ranked the school 118th out of 381 public high schools statewide in its 2011 rankings (a decrease of 31 positions from the 2010 ranking) which were based on the combined percentage of students classified as proficient or above proficient on the mathematics (84.7%) and language arts literacy (96.6%) components of the High School Proficiency Assessment (HSPA).

In the 2011 "Ranking America's High Schools" issue by The Washington Post, the school was ranked 40th in New Jersey and 1,333rd nationwide.

In its 2013 report on "America's Best High Schools", The Daily Beast ranked the school 649th in the nation among participating public high schools and 51st among schools in New Jersey. In the 2012 list of "America's Best High Schools", ranked by Newsweek, South Brunswick High School was ranked 683rd in the nation and 54th in the state, with criteria for ranking include graduation rate, AP/IB/AICE exams taken per student, average SAT/ACT scores and college matriculation rate.

SBHS secured the 60th position among New Jersey high schools in the 2024–2025 rankings, highlighting its strong academic performance

== Curriculum ==
All students attending SBHS are encouraged to take a minimum of 16 units during the duration of their academic career. All students must also take a Practical Art (Such as Business, Technology) and Visual/Performing Art (such as Art I, II, Orchestra or Band). Students are also required to take a 2.5 credit class in Personal Financial Literacy.

The school offers around 20 Advanced Placement (AP) courses such as AP Chemistry, AP Biology, AP Calculus AB, etc.

== Athletics ==
The South Brunswick High School Vikings compete in the Greater Middlesex Conference, which is comprised of public and private high schools in the Middlesex County area, and operates under the supervision of the New Jersey State Interscholastic Athletic Association (NJSIAA). With 2,189 students in grades 10–12, the school was classified by the NJSIAA for the 2019–20 school year as Group IV for most athletic competition purposes, which included schools with an enrollment of 1,060 to 5,049 students in that grade range. The football team competes in Division 5C of the Big Central Football Conference, which includes 60 public and private high schools in Hunterdon, Middlesex, Somerset, Union and Warren counties, which are broken down into 10 divisions by size and location. The school was classified by the NJSIAA as Group V South for football for 2024–2026, which included schools with 1,333 to 2,324 students.

The 1968 boys' basketball team won the Group I state title with a 50–49 win against an East Rutherford High School team coached by Dick Vitale in the final game of the tournament played in front of 12,000 spectators at Convention Hall in Atlantic City.

The baseball team won the Group II state title in 1980 with a 3–1 defeat of runner-up Garfield High School in the championship game played at Mercer County Park.

The SBHS boys' bowling team won the New Jersey state title in 1996 with a combined score of 3,103 and won the Group IV championship in 2019 and 2022. The 2022 team won the Group IV title and won the Tournament of Champions for the first team by defeating Jackson Memorial High School in the finals.

The ice hockey team won the Monsignor Kelly Cup in 2008 and the Kolodney Cup in 2011 The 2010-11 ice hockey team went on to win the inaugural GMC Championship. South Brunswick beat perennial powerhouses Old Bridge High School and St. Joseph High School to reach the final. South Brunswick then went on to be seeded #20 in the NJSIAA Public A Tournament and lost by a score of 3–0 in the first round to Tenafly High School.

The girls' bowling team won the Group IV state championship in 2010 and 2012. The 2010 team went on to win the Tournament of Champions. The 2011-12 girls' bowling team won the GMC title and later won the NJSIAA Central Jersey Group IV title. At the end of that season, the coach was named coach of the year.

The football team won the Central Jersey Group V state sectional championship in 2012, 2015 and 2017. The 2012 football team won the Central Jersey Group V sectional title, beating Manalapan High School by a score of 33–22. The 2015 football team won the Central Jersey Group V sectional title, defeating Old Bridge High School in the tournament final by a score of 42–0. In 2017, the team won its third championship in program history with an 18–14 win against top-seeded Manalapan High School in the final of the Central Jersey Group V state sectional tournament, played at High Point Solutions Stadium; South Brunswick finished the season with an 11–1 record, defeating a Manalapan team that had been undefeated heading into the game.

The boys' track team won the Group IV spring / outdoor track state championship in 2013.

The boys' track team won the Group IV indoor relay state championship in 2013, 2014 and 2019; the girls' team won the Group IV title in 2015 (as co-champion), 2016 and 2017. The 2013 boys' track team won the Group IV state relay championships, the program's first state title.

The boys indoor / winter track team won the Group IV state championship in 2014 and 2020.

The Viking Marching Band competes in USBands Group V Open and was the Group VI New Jersey state champions in the four consecutive seasons from 2013 through 2016 and again from 2018 through 2021, winning in 2022 in Group V Open. The 2026 show, "At the Root of It All," brought back the state championship, while also winning 4th Place Group V Open USBands National Championships at MetLife Stadium.

== Student achievements ==
In the 2011–12 school year, a student was recognized by Guinness World Records for breaking the record for the most high fives in one hour, reaching a total of 1,739 at a pep rally held in the school on March 16, 2012.

== Administration ==
The principal is Peter Varela. His administration team includes four assistant principals.

== Notable alumni ==
- Mya Breitbart (born 1978), professor of biological oceanography at the University of South Florida's College of Marine Science, named among Popular Science magazine's "Brilliant 10" for 2013
- Mike Elko (born 1977, class of 1995), head coach of the Texas A&M Aggies football team
- Donald Fagen (born 1948), a Grammy winning singer-songwriter, best known as the co-founder of the band Steely Dan
- Mor Harchol-Balter (c. 1966, class of 1984), computer scientist specializing in queueing theory, performance prediction and quality of service
- Jeffrey S. Juris (1971–2020, class of 1989), anthropologist, author, political activist and researcher, who studied the Occupy movement and other anti-globalization movements
- Anna Khachiyan (born 1985, class of 2003), co-host of the Red Scare podcast
- Kirsten Lepore (born 1985, class of 2003), writer, director and animator at Marvel Studios
- David Neumann (born 1965, class of 1983), dancer, actor and Tony Award-nominated choreographer
- Steven Portnoy (born 1981, class of 1999), CBS News Radio White House Correspondent
- Anna Quindlen (born 1952, class of 1970), best-selling novelist, Pulitzer Prize-winning columnist
- Ricardo Romero (born 1978, class of 1996), MMA fighter
- Mohamed Sanu (born 1989, class of 2009), American football wide receiver who played in the NFL, most notably for the Atlanta Falcons
- Sydney Schneider (born 1999, class of 2017), goalkeeper for the Kansas City Current of the National Women's Soccer League and for the Jamaica women's national football team
- Justin Shorter (born 2000), professional football tight end for the Las Vegas Raiders
- Katherine S. Squibb (1949–2018), toxicologist who specialized in metal toxicity
- Tammy Tibbetts (born 1985, class of 2003), co-founder and CEO of the non-profit organization She's the First
- Edward J. Watts (born 1975, class of 1993), Roman historian and professor at UC San Diego.
- Cassie Yeung (born 1994), dancer, chef and TikToker

== Notable faculty ==
- Myrna Smith (1941–2010), singer and writer for Sweet Inspirations, backup vocalist for Elvis Presley, faculty in the 1960s
