= Jordan Zimmerman (advertising) =

American advertising executive and philanthropist[

- Born: Jordan Zimmerman; 1955 or 1956 (age 69–70); Newark, New Jersey, U.S.
- Education: B.A. and M.B.A. University of South Florida
- Occupation: Advertising executive
- Known for: Founder of Zimmerman Advertising
- Spouses: Amy B Natiss Paul (divorced); Melissa B Feldman Zimmerman (divorced); Denise Broadrick (divorced); Terry Lee Zimmerman
- Children: 4

Jordan Zimmerman (born 1956 in Newark, New Jersey) is an advertising business mogul and philanthropist who founded the $4.0 billion Zimmerman Advertising firm. He is also a real estate mogul with over 150 mobile home parks and over 47,000 pads. His real estate holdings and personal assets have been independently appraised and audited for well over $3.0 billion.

== Biography ==
Zimmerman was born in Newark, New Jersey, the oldest of four siblings in a middle-class family. His father worked in a family business called Castle Products that manufactured cherries, syrups, toppings, and colas, eventually sold the business, and moved the family to Fort Lauderdale, Florida, from Old Bridge Township, New Jersey, after Zimmerman graduated from Madison Township High School in 1975.

During his senior year in college, his college entered a national college competition to develop an advertising campaign for the National Institute on Drug Abuse; his team's "Just Say No" slogan won the competition and which was adopted by Nancy Reagan in her national campaign against drug use.

In 1978, he graduated with a B.A. in advertising from the University of South Florida and after he was unable to get an advertising job in New York City, returned to USF where he received his MBA in 1980. After school, he returned to live with his parents in Sunrise, Florida and started his own agency. In 1984, he founded Zimmerman Advertising.

Zimmerman is a former owner of the Florida Panthers hockey club; he sold his interests to Vincent Viola and Douglas Cifu for $250 million in 2014.

== Philanthropy and political activities ==
With the Florida Governors appointment, Jordan Zimmerman served on the board of trustees at the University of South Florida, eventually becoming the chairman of the board, where he served for over 12 years. In 2015, he donated $10,000,000 to his alma mater, the University of South Florida where the Zimmerman School of Advertising and Mass Communications is named after him; and where he spearheaded a revamp of the university's Advertising program.

In 2015, he was named to the Horatio Alger Association of Distinguished Americans. Zimmerman is a registered Republican. In 2006 he hosted, in his Boca Raton estate, the sitting President of the United States of America, George W. Bush, for a small gathering of 25 couples, and in one night he raised $1,250,000. He is involved in the Palm Beach Jewish Federation, Take Stock In Children, and the Florence Fuller Child Development Center.

== Mobile Home Park investments ==
Jordan Zimmerman began acquiring Mobile Home Parks in the early 2000s. Over the subsequent decades, he built a significant, diversified portfolio spanning dozens of states, independently appraised and audited at over US$3 billion.

By 2025, Zimmerman's real estate entities control more than 150 mobile home parks comprising over 47,000 individual pads across dozens of states, including Florida, the Carolinas, Georgia, Texas, Arizona, and Northern California. These holdings are among the largest privately held portfolio in the mobile home park industry.

== Personal life ==
Zimmerman has been married four times. His first wife was Amy B Natiss Paul. His second wife was Melissa B Feldman Zimmerman. His third wife was Denise (née Broadrick) Zimmerman who was raised Roman Catholic but converted to Judaism, the religion of her husband. Zimmerman has four children. His fourth wife is Terry Lee Zimmerman. He has homes in Boca Raton, Florida and Westhampton, New York. He is of Jewish descent.
