= Katherine Squibb =

American toxicologist (1949-2018

- Born: Katherine Anne Sprague; May 10, 1949; New Brunswick, New Jersey, U.S.
- Died: August 18, 2018 (aged 69); Columbia, Maryland, U.S.
- Education: University of Wisconsin–Madison; Rutgers University
- Spouse: Robert E. Squibb (m. 1971; died 2016)
- Children: 2
- Scientific career
- Fields: Toxicology
- Workplaces: New York University Medical Center; University of Maryland School of Medicine

Katherine Anne Squibb (née Sprague; May 10, 1949 – August 18, 2018) was an American toxicologist who specialized in metal toxicity. She was a faculty member at the University of Maryland School of Medicine and served as co-director of the University System of Maryland's graduate program in toxicology.

== Life ==
Katherine Anne Sprague was born May 10, 1949, in New Brunswick, New Jersey, the daughter of agronomist Milton Alan Sprague and his wife, Margarete Hardegen Sprague.

Raised in the Dayton section of South Brunswick, New Jersey, Squibb graduated from South Brunswick High School. She majored in biochemistry at University of Wisconsin–Madison, graduating in 1971. Squibb married fellow toxicologist Robert E. Squibb on August 21, 1971. Squibb completed a master's and Ph.D. (1977) in biochemistry at Rutgers University. Her dissertation was titled Control of hepatic metallothionein synthesis by zinc and cadmium. She was a postdoctoral researcher at the National Institute of Environmental Health Sciences.

In 1984, Squibb joined the New York University Medical Center's Institute of Environmental Medicine. In 1993, she joined the department of medicine at the University of Maryland School of Medicine. She worked as the co-director of the University System of Maryland's graduate program in toxicology. She led research on metal toxicity "and metabolism elucidated ways in which metals such as cadmium, lead, and depleted uranium target specific organ systems." In the fall of 2015, She received the achievement graduate education award from the University of Maryland's graduate program in life sciences.

Widowed since 2016, Squibb died on August 18, 2018, in Columbia, Maryland, of Alzheimer's disease. She was survived by daughter Elizabeth Wohler, son Michael Squibb, and grandsons, Flynn Scott Wohler and Everett Michael Wohler.
