= Anthony Seratelli =

American baseball player

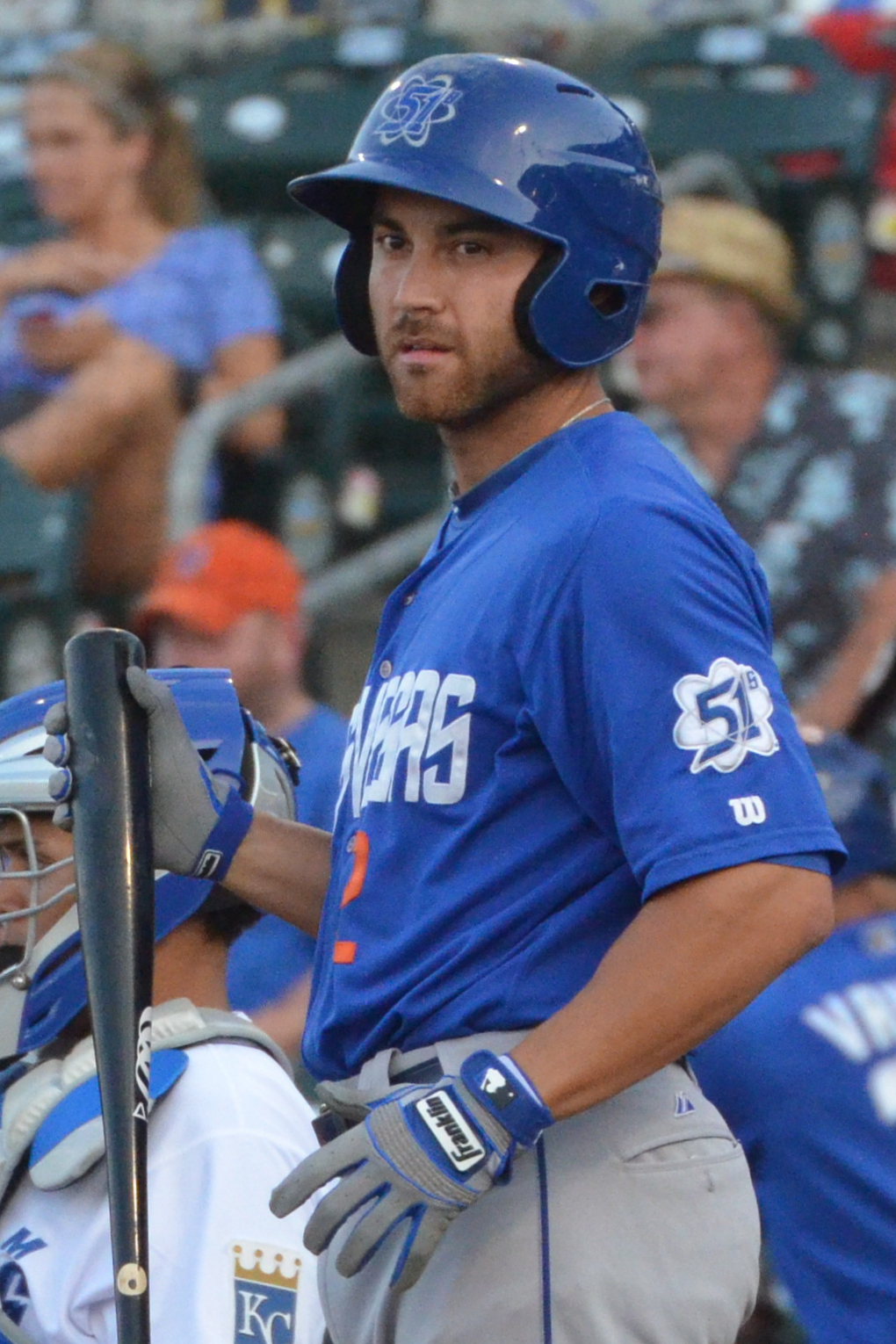
- Seratelli with the Las Vegas 51s in 2014
- Utility player
- Born: February 27, 1983 (age 43); Woodbridge Township, New Jersey, U.S.
- Batted: Switch Threw: Right

NPB debut
- May 22, 2015, for the Saitama Seibu Lions

Last appearance
- July 29, 2015, for the Saitama Seibu Lions

NPB statistics
- Batting average: .183
- Home runs: 0
- Runs batted in: 6
- Stats at Baseball Reference

Teams
- Saitama Seibu Lions (2015)

Anthony Russell Seratelli (born February 27, 1983) is an American former professional baseball second baseman. He has played professionally in independent baseball, Minor League Baseball for the Kansas City Royals and New York Mets organizations and Nippon Professional Baseball (NPB) for the Saitama Seibu Lions. Prior to his professional career, Seratelli attended Seton Hall University, and played college baseball for the Seton Hall Pirates.

== Career ==
Seratelli attended Old Bridge High School in Old Bridge Township, New Jersey. At 4 feet 11 inches (1.50 m), Seratelli was too small to play American football or basketball. He joined the bowling team. He made the varsity baseball team in his junior year, playing shortstop. A leg injury suffered while running the bases prematurely ended his junior year. He threw perfect games for the bowling team as a freshman and as a junior.

Seratelli then enrolled at Seton Hall University. Now 5 feet 11 inches (1.80 m), he tried out for the Seton Hall Pirates baseball team as a walk-on during his freshman year, and made the team. He was voted team captain in his sophomore year. He was not selected in the Major League Baseball draft after graduating from Seton Hall. After a workout in Chicago, he did not receive an offer from an MLB team, but was noticed by the Windy City ThunderBolts of the independent Frontier League, and he began his career with them in 2006.

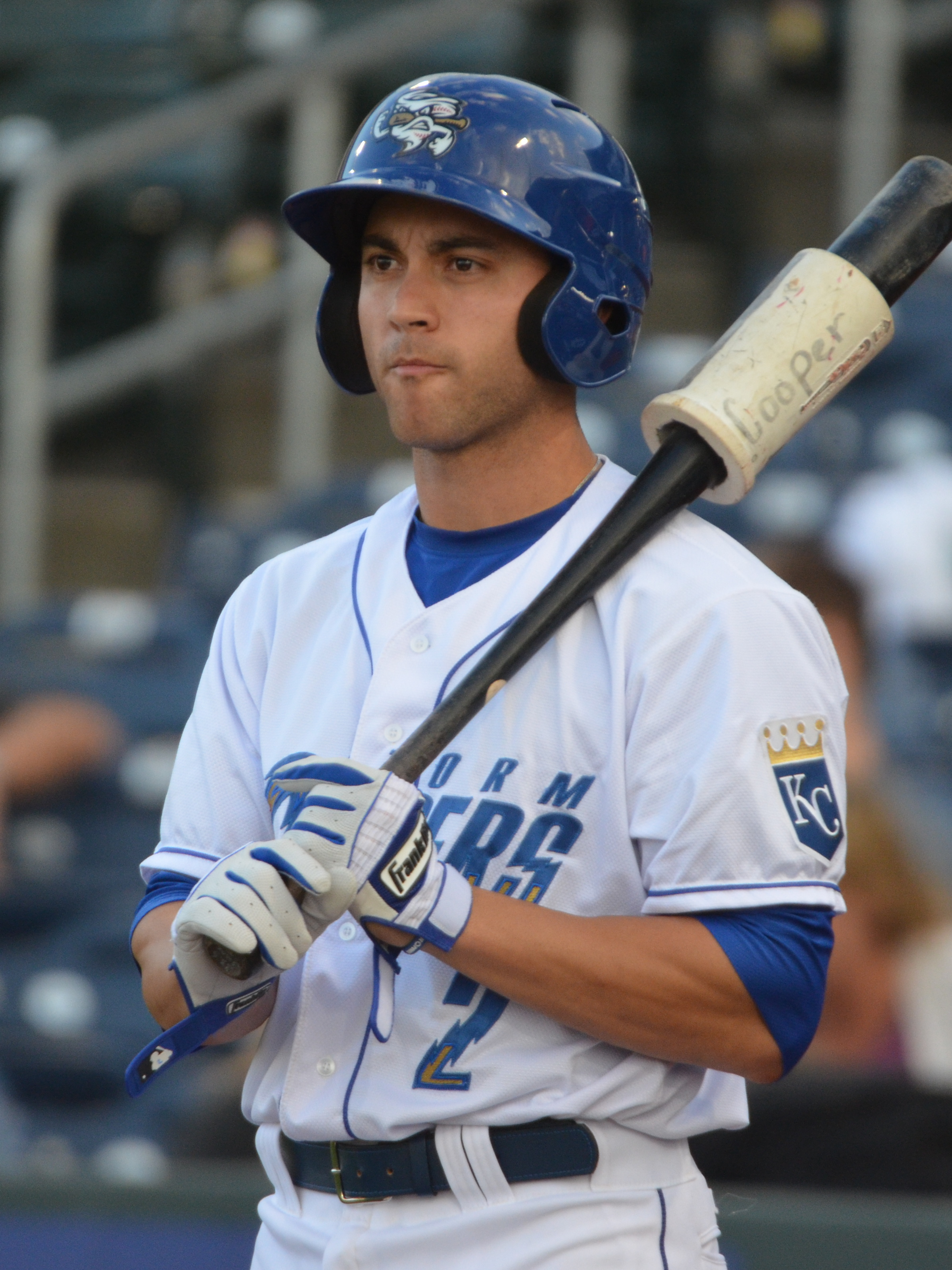
Seratelli with the Omaha Storm Chasers in 2013

In February 2007, Seratelli attended a tryout with the Kansas City Royals, who signed him to a minor league contract. While playing for the Northwest Arkansas Naturals of the Class AA Texas League in 2011, he was named an All-Star. After the 2011 season, the Royals named Seratelli their farm system's best baserunner, and assigned him to the Arizona Fall League.

After the 2013 season, Seratelli became a free agent. He signed a minor league contract with the Mets, receiving an invitation to spring training in 2014. The Mets evaluated Seratelli as a shortstop. At the end of spring training, the Mets chose Omar Quintanilla over Seratelli, and Seratelli began the season with the Las Vegas 51s of the Class AAA Pacific Coast League.

On December 12, 2014, Seratelli signed with the Saitama Seibu Lions of Nippon Professional Baseball.

Seratelli signed a minor league deal with the Arizona Diamondbacks in November 2015. However, he announced his retirement prior to the start of the 2016 season.

== Business ventures ==
During his baseball career, Seratelli ventured into the business world forming a production company called ARS*1 Productions (his initials and college baseball number). After leaving baseball and diving into production full-time, he rebranded his company to Jersey Filmmaker in 2018, now known for its premier production team and global creative services.

Focusing on branded content along with scripted and unscripted pieces in sports, music and entertainment, Seratelli has worked with various networks and platforms to develop and execute both long and short features. In addition to his TV and broadcast relationships, Seratelli partners with top brands NASCAR, Fanatics and Walmart, reaching a wide audience with his work.

Seratelli produced and directed a 10-part racing docu-series for Fox Sports that reached millions of viewers. A Beautiful Lie, a documentary produced and filmed by Seratelli played in multiple Film Festivals as well as his Executive Produced and edited feature film, Double Belgian, streams on Amazon, Apple TV, Google Play and Fandango. He has also produced and edited a 5-part docs-series on internet celebrity Lele Pons in collaboration with Shots Studios, which is set to stream on YouTube Originals in May 2020. Other major platforms and brands Seratelli and his company have worked with are Showtime, MSG & the New York Red Bulls with stories surrounding athletes like Floyd Mayweather, Peyton Manning and Aaron Judge.

In 2023, Seratelli co-founded MoonBall Media alongside former MLB All-Star Eric Hosmer, creating an MLB player-owned production company focused on athlete-driven storytelling. MoonBall specializes in sports documentaries, unscripted series, and branded content, while also owning and programming a professional sports FAST channel, MoonBall Sports TV.

== Personal ==
Seratelli was born in Woodbridge Township, New Jersey. He and his family lived in his great-grandparents house early in his life. His family moved to Old Bridge when he entered the sixth grade. His parents divorced, and his mother moved to California, with Anthony and his sister, Danyel, staying with their father, Russell. During his professional baseball career, Seratelli formed a production company, called ArS*1 Productions, in 2012, which became Jersey Filmmaker in 2017.

Russell and Danyel were involved in a motor collision in 2011 in which Russell died. Anthony referred to his father as "the greatest man that ever lived", and has dedicated his career to his memory.

His grandmother was born in Japan.
