= Shannon Sohn =

American news reporter (born 1974)

Shannon Paige Sohn (born February 27, 1974) is a television news reporter at WABC-TV Eyewitness News in New York City, where she became the first helicopter reporter to win a national Emmy Award.

== Early life and education ==
Sohn grew up in Old Bridge Township, New Jersey, and graduated from Cedar Ridge High School in 1992. She attended Rutgers University, majoring in journalism and communications with a minor in advertising. While in college, Sohn spent two years as an intern at WCTC News Radio in New Brunswick, New Jersey. Shortly before her graduation, WCTC offered her a position as a weekend news anchor and to fill a vacancy in the station's aerial traffic reporter spot, which was being vacated by Dan Rice who was heading to WABC-TV in New York City. Sohn won a reporting award from the Associated Press while at WCTC.

In 2000, she earned a degree in broadcast meteorology degree through courses taken online at Mississippi State University.

== Career ==
Sohn started doing airplane traffic reports for three New York City radio stations, WABC, WHTZ, and WPLJ. In 2001, she was hired by WABC-TV as part of its Eyewitness News Team on NewsCopter 7.

She won a Peabody Award for her coverage of the September 11 terrorist attacks. She was scheduled to end her shift just minutes after the first tower was hit and did not leave her chair in the studio until Friday, providing news to the public as it came in from reporters in the field.

In 2005, while flying in the WABC helicopter, she was able to track the crash of the WNBC Chopper 4 helicopter, using the helicopter's camera to track the crash, hoping that the images would allow emergency personnel to be accurately and quickly directed to the precise location of the incident. Sohn won a local Emmy Award for "Instant Breaking News" for her coverage of the crash. The clip was submitted for a national Emmy Award which Sohn won, making her the first helicopter reporter to win a national Emmy.

== Personal life ==
In May 2001, Sohn married Dan Rice, who had trained her at WCTC and was then working for crosstown rival WNBC on its Chopper 4.

Sohn and Rice live with their children Mackenzie and Zachary in the Long Valley section of Washington Township, Morris County, New Jersey.
