= Jeffrey S. Juris =

American anthropologist (1971–2020)

- Born: Jeffrey S. Juris; December 10, 1971; South Brunswick, New Jersey, U.S.
- Died: June 18, 2020 (aged 48)
- Occupation: Anthropologist

Academic background
- Education: University of California, Berkeley

Academic work
- Discipline: Anthropology
- Institutions: Northeastern University
- Website: www.jeffreyjuris.com

Jeffrey S. Juris (December 10, 1971 – June 18, 2020) was an American professor who taught anthropology at Northeastern University. His fields of his research were the Occupy movement and other anti-globalization movements.

== Early life and education ==
Raised in South Brunswick, New Jersey, Juris graduated from South Brunswick High School as the salutatorian of the class of 1989. He received his undergraduate degree in 1993 from Wesleyan University, where he majored in sociology and anthropology, and received his Ph.D. in anthropology in 2004 at the University of California, Berkeley.

== Political activity ==
Juris was involved with Occupy Boston on Dewey Square, both as a protester and as an academic observer. In his article, "Reflections on #Occupy Everywhere", he asserted that websites and listservs were a big part of the inception of Occupy, but the movement took a turn towards a more decentralized, social media led organization. He believed this was for the best as their online presence allows for the movement to maintain some sort of media influence. Juris noted that social media outlets, such as Facebook and Twitter, were an important part of organizing movements at the initial stages, but have since slowed their presence on internet platforms. Juris also noted that the modeling of the movement was based on the structure of social media. It was no longer about getting people to join the movement, but rather to bring as many groups of people together for their unique agenda. Juris argued that new radical democracy did not depend on a consensus among everyone, but rather a respect for other people's point of view. He held the new social media platforms' call for new types of political, social, and economic organizations. Juris had been working on a new project that explored the topic of pirate radio in Mexico City and beyond. This was to be based on his 15 months of research both academically and in the field.

== Works ==
Juris was the author of Networking Futures: the Movements Against Corporate Globalization, co-author of Global Democracy and the World Social Forums, co-editor of Insurgent Encounters: Transnational Activism, Ethnography, and the Political, and written many more articles on related topics.

His last and most popular work was Networking Futures, which used extensive ethnographic research into the Barcelona-based Movement for Global Resistance. Along with his first-hand experience, interviews with key actors, social media networking, and involvement in organizing protests, Jeffrey formulated theories and proposals on why these movements have been successful.

Juris and other OWS activists created a website called Occupy Research that allows researchers to share tools and data sets for the Occupy Movement. The website was taken down for lack of activity, but Juris maintained the records.

== Death ==
Juris died on June 18, 2020, after a year-long battle with brain cancer.
