= East Brunswick Public Schools =

School district in Middlesex County, New Jersey, US

Address
- 760 Route 18 East Brunswick, Middlesex County, New Jersey, 08816; United States
- Coordinates: 40.423893°N 74.379025°W

District information
- Grades: PreK-12
- Superintendent: Evelyn Mamman
- Business administrator: Joseph Crotchfelt
- Schools: 11

Students and staff
- Enrollment: 8,163 (as of 2024–25)
- Faculty: 724.4 FTEs
- Student–teacher ratio: 11.3:1

Other information
- District Factor Group: I
- Website: www.ebnet.org
Ind.	Per pupil	District spending	Rank (*)	K-12 average	%± vs. average
1A	Total Spending	$19,169	64	$18,891	1.5%
1	Budgetary Cost	14,029	42	14,783	−5.1%
2	Classroom Instruction	8,447	40	8,763	−3.6%
6	Support Services	2,356	54	2,392	−1.5%
8	Administrative Cost	1,432	49	1,485	−3.6%
10	Operations & Maintenance	1,600	48	1,783	−10.3%
13	Extracurricular Activities	154	16	268	−42.5%
16	Median Teacher Salary	62,675	37	64,043
Data from NJDoE 2014 Taxpayers' Guide to Education Spending. *Of K-12 districts with more than 3,500 students. Lowest spending=1; Highest=103

East Brunswick Public Schools is a comprehensive community public school district serving students from pre-kindergarten through twelfth grade in East Brunswick, in Middlesex County, in the U.S. state of New Jersey.

As of the 2024–25 school year, the district, comprised of 11 schools, had an enrollment of 8,163 students and 724.4 classroom teachers (on an FTE basis), for a student–teacher ratio of 11.3:1.

The district had been classified by the New Jersey Department of Education as being in District Factor Group "I", the second-highest of eight groupings. District Factor Groups organize districts statewide to allow comparison by common socioeconomic characteristics of the local districts. From lowest socioeconomic status to highest, the categories are A, B, CD, DE, FG, GH, I and J.

== Awards and recognition ==
East Brunswick is the only district in the State of New Jersey having eleven schools designated Blue Ribbon School / National School of Excellence by the United States Department of Education. Schools that have been recognized as Blue Ribbon Schools are Irwin School (1989–90), East Brunswick High School (1990–91), Lawrence Brook School (1991–92), Churchill Junior High School (1994–95), Hammarskjold Middle School (1994–95), Bowne-Munro School (1996–97), Murray A. Chittick Elementary School (1998–99), Warnsdorfer Elementary School (2000–01), Frost Elementary School (2010–11), Central Elementary School (2011–12), and Memorial Elementary School (2012–13).

The district was selected as one of the top "100 Best Communities for Music Education in America 2005" by the American Music Conference.

Students from all schools, particularly EBHS, have garnered state and national honors in academics, athletics, and the arts.

== Schools ==
East Brunswick Public Schools' facilities consists of 11 school facilities plus two administration buildings; in addition, the East Brunswick Public Library serves as a repository for public examination of all curricula as well as serving as an important education-related resource for the community.

Schools in the district (with 2024-25 enrollment data from the National Center for Education Statistics) are:

Elementary schools

- Bowne-Munro Elementary School (with 201 students; in grades PreK–4)
  - Kristin Gristina, principal
- Central Elementary School (349; PreK–4)
  - Michael Gaskell, principal
- Murray A. Chittick Elementary School (338; PreK–4)
  - Rachel Solomon, interim principal
- Robert Frost Elementary School (383; PreK–4)
  - Nyree Delgado, principal
- Irwin Elementary School (305; PreK–4)
  - JoAnn Chmielowicz, principal
- Lawrence Brook Elementary School (362; PreK–4)
  - Peter DiBernardi, principal
- Memorial Elementary School (408; K–4)
  - Cheryl Jones, principal
- Warnsdorfer Elementary School (325; K–4)
  - Joseph Csatari, principal
- Hammarskjold Upper Elementary School (1,221; 5–6)
  - Russell Petronko, principal

Junior high school

- Churchill Junior High School (2,080; 7–9)
  - Matthew Hanas, principal

High school

- East Brunswick High School (2,124; 10-12)
  - Edward Bucior, principal

Other facilities

- Jon R. Kopko Administration Building

The East Brunswick Public Schools Administration Building, renamed in honor of long-time Superintendent of Schools Jon R. Kopko upon his retirement in 2000, is situated at 760 Route 18 North. Government-access television Board of Education meetings are held in the Administration building and are televised by EBTV to Comcast Cable TV subscribers within the Township.

- Support Operations Building

The East Brunswick Public Schools Support Operations Building, located at 18 Edgeboro Road, houses the district's transportation department office and school bus parking lot as well as the buildings and grounds / maintenance department.

=== Expansion ===
In 10 years 1994 through 2004, the number of students served by East Brunswick Public Schools grew by 1,850 students, the equivalent of 60 to 75 new classrooms (on the basis of 25 to 30 students each), reflecting the population growth in East Brunswick as a whole. This growth led to overcrowding at elementary schools, necessitated busing to transport students to schools when there was no existing facility near their home and required the use of trailers at the Middle School to accommodate the influx of students. With additional property zoned for residential use, school population was expected to grow in the years ahead.

Schools in the state are funded primarily by property taxes, which increased at a rate of 7% annually from 2000 to 2007. Rapid rises in property taxes tend to cause seniors and empty-nesters to sell their existing homes to families with children, which led to further increases to the school-age population.

In December 2004, following a public campaign in its support, voters approved a $106.1 million referendum for the additions and improvements at Central, Lawrence Brook, and Hammarskjold Middle Schools. Previous bond referendums in 1994 and 1995 had failed to obtain voter approval. For 2004, an additional ca. $54 million believed necessary for renovations at other East Brunswick School facilities (which would have brought the total to $160 million) was deferred.

Of this sum, $24.7 million was to be contributed by the State of New Jersey. The rebuilding of Hammarskjold Middle School was planned to cost $66.5 million, of which $12.3 million was to have come from the State. Central School renovation and expansion were planned to cost about $20.7 million, of which $6.4 million was to have come from the State. Lawrence Brook School renovation and expansion were expected to cost around $19 million, of which approximately $6 million was to have come from the State.

=== Decommissioned facilities ===
Several older prewar school facilities in East Brunswick have been decommissioned. They date from the period before the rapid expansion of East Brunswick in the 1960s and provide a glimpse of how the township appeared before the burgeoning residential build-outs of the 1950s and, on plots sized at a minimum of 1/3 acre (0.13 ha), of the 1960s. The few prewar school structures that remain are readily identifiable as red-brick, two-story buildings. McGinnis School (at Dunhams Corner Road and Hardenburg Lane), opened in 1926 and last used for instruction in 1978, was demolished in January 2015. It has been replaced by a parochial school building of similar form, built by Torah Links of Middlesex County. Weber School (at Riva Avenue and Hardenburg Lane), a near-twin of McGinnis, was sold in 2006 to St. Mary Coptic Orthodox Church, which continues to use the building as a school.

== Special education ==
Special education is a key component of the education provided by East Brunswick Public Schools to eligible students.

East Brunswick Public Schools provides such services in compliance with the Federal Individuals with Disabilities Education Act (IDEA) and related State of New Jersey Statutes. Accordingly, each eligible student is educated in a least restrictive environment (LRE) according to an individualized education plan (IEP) drafted by his or her child study team (CST) consisting of school personnel and parents. Eligibility determinations are made every three years. Special services may include speech therapy, occupational therapy, educational aides, and other services as appropriate and called for. A Director of Special Education, currently Sharon Weber-Oleszkiewicz, manages East Brunswick Public Schools' program of providing special services. At the district level, the director is supported by a Supervisor of Elementary School Special Education, a Supervisor of Secondary School Special Education, and a Supervisor of Autism Spectrum Program.

Special education is supported at the schools by individual professionals including specialists (in math, reading and speech), special education teachers, teacher resource personnel, teacher aides and child study team personnel (a category which may include psychologists, learning disabled teaching consultants, and social workers). These individuals come into direct contact with those students who require special services.

Students receiving special services may be eligible for participation in an extended school year (ESY) program by which they attend instructional classes during the summer.

Pre-school and kindergarten students eligible for special education services receive instruction from an early age and full-time kindergarten (conventionally, East Brunswick Public Schools offers only half-day kindergarten).

=== Individualized Education Program (IEP) process ===
East Brunswick Public Schools has a commitment to special education.

The processes mandated by IDEA, while saving the educational lives of many affected students, also pose many challenges to educators and parents. The IEP process can be lengthy. A child requiring special services needs a substantial investment in time on the part of the parents, the child's greatest advocate. Parents need to consider outside evaluations and consult with others. Parents may refer to the published curricula made available by East Brunswick Public Schools at The East Brunswick Public Library. East Brunswick Public Schools uses "leveled reading" terminology to specify reading skills. Leveling schemes are highly technical. One scheme by which, e.g., "Level J" is an end-of-first-grade reading level, is the Fountas and Pinnell "Benchmark Assessment" System. Achieving a properly defined plan, it is important to conduct a full and proper evaluation. The individualized aspect of the IEP is critical.

Educating a special needs child is a project. Project planning is a discipline in industry and government. It can be challenging to provide the ongoing monitoring of progress and support of course-correction activity that is required to provision a high-quality planned educational program to eligible students.

The IDEA guarantees the services needed by special students. It is wise for parents to familiarize themselves with relevant portions of the IDEA text. Alternatively one may team with an advocate who can, potentially, attend the IEP meetings with parents.

== Administration ==
Core members of the district's administration are:

- Evelyn Mamman, superintendent
- Joseph Crotchfelt, business administrator / board secretary

Superintendent of Schools Murray A. Chittick served from 1929 through 1957. Joseph Sweeney served as superintendent from the early 1970s through the mid 1980s. Jon Kopko was the superintendent from 1989 through 2000. Superintendent Jamie Savedoff served from July 2000 through March 2003. Jo Ann Magistro served as superintendent from 2003 through 2013. Interim superintendent Patrick Piegari served from 2013 through 2014. Victor Valeski served as superintendent from 2014-2025. Evelyn Mamman’s appointment was announced by the East Brunswick Board of Education in September 2025, and became effective December 1, 2025.

== Board of education ==
The district's board of education, comprised of nine members, sets policy and oversees the fiscal and educational operation of the district through its administration. As a Type II school district, the board's trustees are elected directly by voters to serve three-year terms of office on a staggered basis, with three seats up for election each year held (since 2012) as part of the November general election. The board appoints a superintendent to oversee the district's day-to-day operations and a business administrator to supervise the business functions of the district.
