= South Brunswick Public Schools =

School district in Middlesex County, New Jersey, US

Address
- 231 Black Horse Lane Monmouth Junction, Middlesex County, New Jersey, 08852; United States
- Coordinates: 40.42082°N 74.514238°W

District information
- Grades: Pre-K to 12
- Superintendent: Bernard F. Bragen Jr.
- Business administrator: David E. Pawlowski
- Schools: 12

Students and staff
- Enrollment: 7,936 (as of 2023–24)
- Faculty: 665.4 FTEs
- Student–teacher ratio: 11.9:1

Other information
- District Factor Group: I
- Website: www.sbschools.org
Ind.	Per pupil	District spending	Rank (*)	K-12 average	%± vs. average
1A	Total Spending	$15,964	13	$18,891	−15.5%
1	Budgetary Cost	12,235	9	14,783	−17.2%
2	Classroom Instruction	7,439	8	8,763	−15.1%
6	Support Services	1,394	4	2,392	−41.7%
8	Administrative Cost	1,327	30	1,485	−10.6%
10	Operations & Maintenance	1,811	68	1,783	1.6%
13	Extracurricular Activities	182	24	268	−32.1%
16	Median Teacher Salary	67,375	66	64,043
Data from NJDoE 2014 Taxpayers' Guide to Education Spending. *Of K-12 districts with more than 3,500 students. Lowest spending=1; Highest=103

The South Brunswick Public Schools are a comprehensive community public school district, serving students in pre-kindergarten through twelfth grade from South Brunswick in Middlesex County, in the U.S. state of New Jersey.

As of the 2023–24 school year, the district, comprised of 12 schools, had an enrollment of 7,936 students and 665.4 classroom teachers (on an FTE basis), for a student–teacher ratio of 11.9:1.

== History ==
Over a two-decade period, district enrollment more than doubled, from 4,000 in 1991 to more than 9,000 in 2011 and high school enrollment doubling to nearly 2,000 in the decade prior to 2001 and increasing by another 1,000 in the subsequent decade. Enrollment subsequently declined, from 8,620 students in the 2018-19 school year to less than 8,000 in 2023–24.

The district had been classified by the New Jersey Department of Education as being in District Factor Group "I", the second-highest of eight groupings. District Factor Groups organize districts statewide to allow comparison by common socioeconomic characteristics of the local districts. From lowest socioeconomic status to highest, the categories are A, B, CD, DE, FG, GH, I and J.

== Awards and recognition ==
Five of the district's schools have received the National Blue Ribbon Award of Excellence from the United States Department of Education, the highest honor that an American school can achieve: South Brunswick High School (1990–91), Greenbrook School (1991–92), Crossroads Middle School (1992–93), Cambridge Elementary School (1996–97), Constable Elementary School (2000–01).

Five of South Brunswick's schools have been named as a "Star School" by the New Jersey Department of Education, the highest honor that a New Jersey school can achieve:

- Cambridge Elementary School in the 1993-94 school year,
- Dayton Elementary School in the 1993-94 school year,
- Indian Fields Elementary School in the 1993-94 school year,
- Monmouth Junction Elementary School in the 1998-99 school year, and
- South Brunswick High School in the 2000-01 school year

Indian Fields School was recognized by Governor Jim McGreevey in 2003 as one of 25 schools selected statewide for the First Annual Governor's School of Excellence award.

South Brunswick High School was one of 433 schools to be recognized by the College Board on their 7th Annual AP District Honor Roll. SBHS is also home to the award-winning Viking Marching Band, which swept the 2013 New Jersey state championship to win its seventh state title.

== Schools ==
Schools in the district (with 2023–24 enrollment data from the National Center for Education Statistics) are:

Preschools

- Dayton Preschool with 94 students in PreK
  - Megan Plummer, principal
- Deans Preschool with 108 students in PreK
  - Megan Plummer, principal

Elementary schools

- Brooks Crossing Elementary School with 540 students in grades K–5
  - Jaime Maccarone, principal
- Brunswick Acres Elementary School with 444 students in grades PreK–5
  - Stacey Ta, principal
- Cambridge Elementary School with 427 students in grades K–5
  - Christi Pemberton, principal
- Constable Elementary School with 504 students in grades PreK–5
  - Cristina Vildostegui-Cerra, principal
- Greenbrook Elementary School with 395 students in grades PreK–5
  - Jodi Mahoney, principal
- Indian Fields Elementary School with 473 students in grades K–5
  - Gary W. Abbamont, interim principl
- Monmouth Junction Elementary School with 281 students in grades PreK–5
  - Michael Scheese

Middle schools

- Crossroads North Middle School is located in Monmouth Junction. The school serves students in grades six through eight. As of the 2023–24 school year, the school had 961 students and 80 full-time equivalent teachers, for a student–teacher ratio of approximately 12:1.
  - Kimberly Bynoe, principal
- Crossroads South Middle School is located in Monmouth Junction. The school serves students in grades six through eight. As of the 2023–24 school year, the school had 923 students and approximately 77 full-time equivalent teachers, for a student–teacher ratio of about 12:1.
  - Bonnie Capes, principal

High school

- South Brunswick High School with 2,728 students in grades 9–12
  - Peter Varela, principal

== Administration ==
Core members of the district's administration are:

- Bernard F. Bragen Jr., superintendent
- David E. Pawlowski, business administrator / board secretary

== Board of education ==
The district's board of education, comprised of nine members, sets policy and oversees the fiscal and educational operation of the district through its administration. As a Type II school district, the board's trustees are elected directly by voters to serve three-year terms of office on a staggered basis, with three seats up for election each year held (since 2012) as part of the November general election. The board appoints a superintendent to oversee the district's day-to-day operations and a business administrator to supervise the business functions of the district.
