= Quinton Crawford =

American basketball coach (born 1990)

Portland Trail Blazers
- Title: Assistant coach
- League: NBA

Personal information
- Born: September 18, 1990 (age 36) Old Bridge Township, New Jersey, U.S.
- Listed height: 6 ft 2 in (1.88 m)
- Listed weight: 200 lb (91 kg)

Career information
- High school: Old Bridge (Old Bridge Township, New Jersey)
- College: Middlesex CC (2009–2011); Arizona (2011–2013)
- NBA draft: 2013: undrafted
- Position: Guard
- Coaching career: 2013–present

Career history

Coaching
- 2018–2019: Charlotte Hornets (player development)
- 2019–2022: Los Angeles Lakers (assistant)
- 2022–2023: Dallas Mavericks (assistant)
- 2023–2024: Phoenix Suns (assistant)
- 2024–2025: Stockton Kings
- 2025–present: Portland Trail Blazers (assistant)

Career highlights
- As head coach: NBA G League champion (2025); As assistant coach: NBA champion (2020)

Quinton Crawford (born September 18, 1990) is an American basketball coach who currently serves as an assistant coach for the Portland Trail Blazers of the National Basketball Association (NBA). He recently served as the head coach for the Stockton Kings of the NBA G League. He played college basketball for the Arizona Wildcats, and then started his career as video coordinator and assistant coach.

== Early life ==
Raised in Old Bridge Township, New Jersey, Crawford played prep basketball at Old Bridge High School.

== College career ==
After two years at Middlesex County College, he transferred to the University of Arizona and played for the Wildcats for two seasons (2011–12 and 2012–13), reaching the Sweet Sixteen.

== Coaching career ==
Before working in the NBA, Crawford spent two seasons (2013–14 and 2014–15) with Pepperdine University men's basketball staff as a graduate manager and video coordinator.

Crawford has also served as assistant video coordinator for the Sacramento Kings in one season, Charlotte Hornets in one season, and two seasons with the Orlando Magic while under Frank Vogel. During the 2018–19 season, Crawford was also considered a player development coach for the Hornets.

In summer 2019, he was hired by Frank Vogel as assistant coach for the Los Angeles Lakers. Crawford won his first championship when the Lakers defeated the Miami Heat in 6 games of the 2020 NBA Finals.

In 2022, Crawford was hired as assistant coach for the Dallas Mavericks under Jason Kidd's coaching staff.

On June 1, 2023, it was reported that Crawford was hired as an assistant coach for the Phoenix Suns under head coach Frank Vogel. The move was made official alongside the rest of the team's new coaching staff on June 21, 2023. Crawford would later be fired alongside the rest of Frank Vogel's coaching staff (outside of David Fizdale) on May 12, 2024, following the replacement of Vogel with Mike Budenholzer.

On October 7, 2024, Crawford was hired by the Stockton Kings to be their new head coach.

On May 31, 2025, the Portland Trail Blazers hired Crawford to serve as an assistant coach under head coach Chauncey Billups.
