= Justin Shorter =

American football player (born 2000)

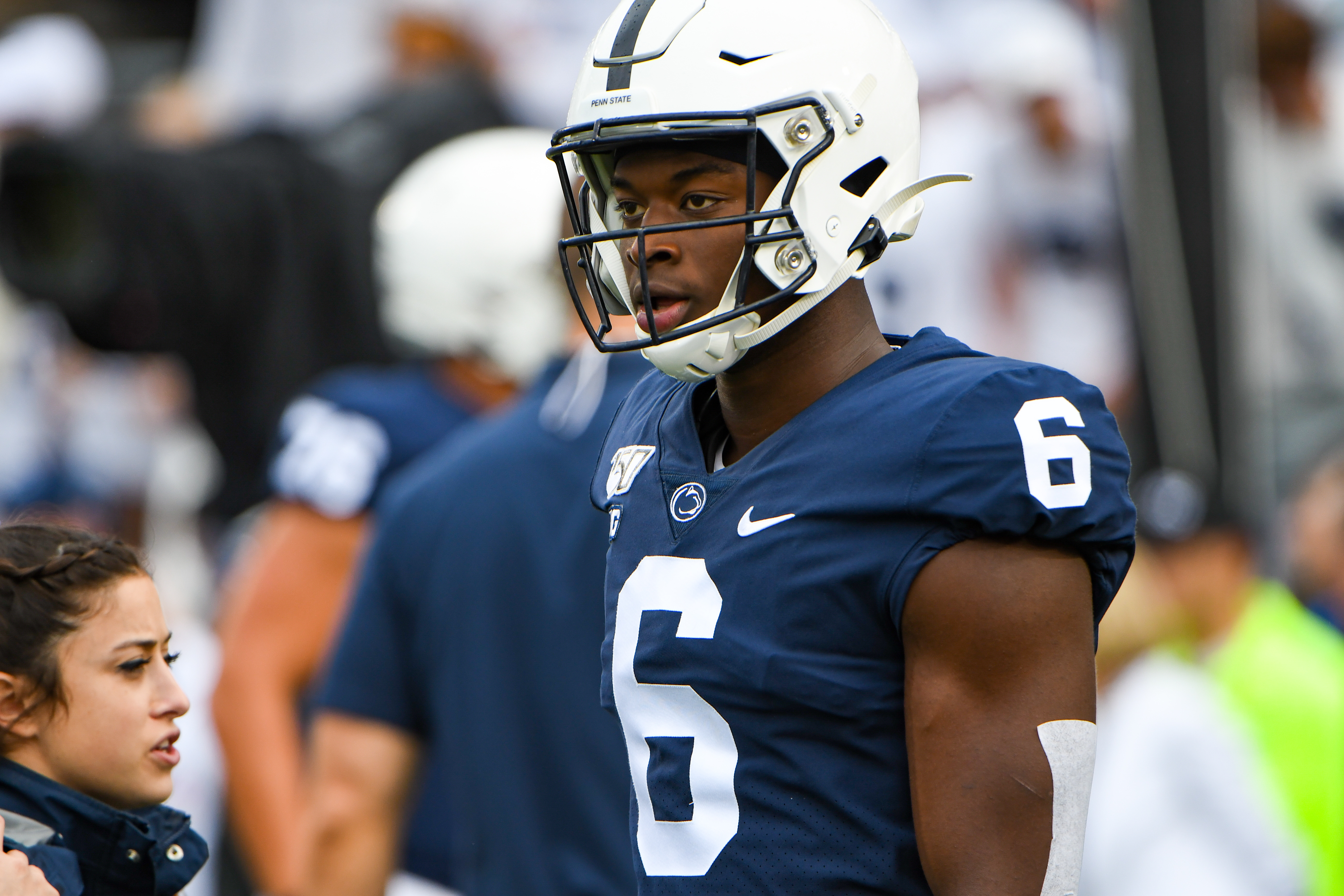
- Shorter with the Penn State Nittany Lions in 2019

Profile
- Position: Wide receiver / tight end

Personal information
- Born: April 17, 2000 (age 26); Princeton, New Jersey, U.S.
- Listed height: 6 ft 4 in (1.93 m)
- Listed weight: 227 lb (103 kg)

Career information
- High school: South Brunswick (South Brunswick, New Jersey)
- College: Penn State (2018–2019); Florida (2020–2022)
- NFL draft: 2023: 5th round, 150th overall pick

Career history
- Buffalo Bills (2023)*; Las Vegas Raiders (2024–2026)
- * Offseason or practice squad member only

Career NFL statistics as of 2025
- Games played: 17
- Tackles: 3
- Stats at Pro Football Reference

Justin D. Shorter (born April 17, 2000) is an American professional football wide receiver and tight end. He played college football for the Penn State Nittany Lions and Florida Gators. Shorter has played for the Las Vegas Raiders in the National Football League (NFL).

== Early life ==
Shorter grew up in the Monmouth Junction section of South Brunswick, New Jersey, where he played prep football at South Brunswick High School.

College recruiting
Name	Hometown	School	Height	Weight	Commit date
Justin Shorter; WR	Princeton, NJ	South Brunswick	6 ft 4 in (1.93 m)	213 lb (97 kg)	Aug 6, 2016
Justin Shorter; WR	Recruit ratings: Scout: Rivals: 247Sports: ESPN:				
Overall recruit ranking: Rivals: 18 247Sports: 7 ESPN: 8
Note: In many cases, Scout, Rivals, 247Sports, On3, and ESPN may conflict in their listings of height and weight.; In these cases, the average was taken. ESPN grades are on a 100-point scale.; Sources: "2018 Team Ranking". Rivals.com.

== College career ==
Shorter began his college career at Penn State. He played in four games and caught three passes for 20 yards as a true freshman before redshirting the season. Shorter had 12 receptions for 137 yards ten games into his redshirt freshman season before entering the NCAA transfer portal.

Shorter ultimately transferred to Florida. He was granted immediate eligibility to play for Florida after transferring after receiving a waiver from the NCAA. Shorter had 25 receptions for 268 yards and three touchdowns in his first season with the Gators. As a redshirt junior, he caught 41 passes for 550 yards and three touchdowns. Shorter had 29 catches for 577 yards and two touchdowns during his redshirt senior season. After the regular season, he announced he would forgo playing in the 2022 Las Vegas Bowl and declared for the 2023 NFL draft.

== Professional career ==
Pre-draft measurables
Height	Weight	Arm length	Hand span	Wingspan	40-yard dash	10-yard split	20-yard split	20-yard shuttle	Three-cone drill	Vertical jump	Broad jump	Bench press
6 ft 4 1/4 in (1.94 m)	229 lb (104 kg)	33 3/4 in (0.86 m)	10 in (0.25 m)	6 ft 10 3/8 in (2.09 m)	4.55 s	1.59 s	2.63 s	4.46 s	7.35 s	35.5 in (0.90 m)	10 ft 6 in (3.20 m)	18 reps
All values from NFL Combine/Pro Day

=== Buffalo Bills ===
Shorter was selected by the Buffalo Bills in the fifth round, 150th overall, of the 2023 NFL draft. He was placed on injured reserve on August 30, 2023.

Shorter was released by the Bills as part of final roster cuts on August 27, 2024.

=== Las Vegas Raiders ===
On August 29, 2024, Shorter was signed to the Las Vegas Raiders' practice squad. He was promoted to the active roster on November 1.

On August 26, 2025, Shorter was waived by the Raiders as part of final roster cuts and re-signed to the practice squad the next day. On September 5, Shorter was promoted to the active roster. He was waived on October 27, following the Raiders signing Tyler Lockett. Shorter was re-signed to the practice squad on October 28.

Shorter signed a reserve/future contract with Las Vegas on January 5, 2026. He was placed on injured reserve on May 4. On September 29, Shorter was waived.

== Career statistics ==
Legend
**Bold**	Career high

=== NFL ===
Year	Team	Games		Receiving					Tackles			Fumbles				
Year	Team	GP	GS	Rec	Yds	Avg	Lng	TD	Cmb	Solo	Ast	FF	Fum	FR	Yds	TD
2024	LV	10	0	0	0	0.0	0	0	0	0	0	0	0	0	0	0
2025	LV	7	0	0	0	0.0	0	0	**3**	0	**3**	0	0	0	0	0
Career		17	0	0	0	0.0	0	0	3	0	3	0	0	0	0	0

=== College ===
Season	Games		Receiving					Rushing				Kick returns			
Season	GP	GS	Rec	Yds	Avg	YPG	TD	Att	Yds	Avg	TD	Ret	Yds	Avg	TD
2018	4	0	3	20	6.7	5.0	0	**1**	**9**	**9.0**	0	0	0	0	0
2019	10	5	12	137	11.4	13.7	0	0	0	0	0	0	0	0	0
2020	12	0	25	268	10.7	22.3	**3**	0	0	0	0	**2**	**34**	**17.0**	0
2021	13	12	**41**	550	13.4	42.3	**3**	0	0	0	0	1	0	0	0
2022	9	9	29	**577**	**19.9**	**64.1**	2	0	0	0	0	0	0	0	0
Career	48	26	110	1,552	14.1	32.3	8	1	9	9.0	0	3	34	11.3	0
