= Monmouth Junction, New Jersey =

Populated place in Middlesex County, New Jersey, US

- Census-designated place
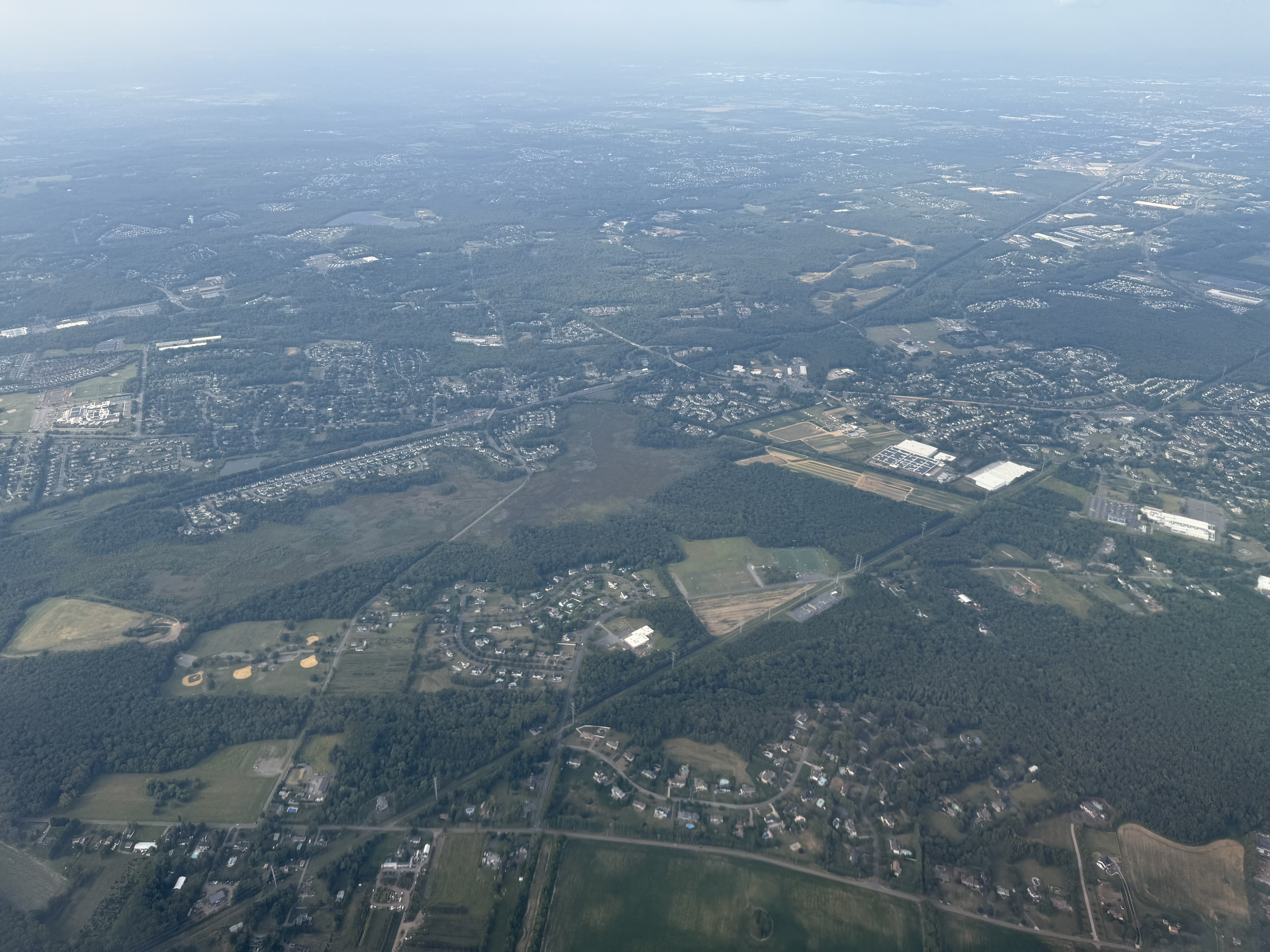
- Aerial view of Monmouth Junction

- Map of Monmouth Junction CDP in Middlesex County. Inset: Location of Middlesex County in New Jersey.

- Location in Middlesex County Location in New Jersey Location in the United States
- Coordinates: 40.380345°N 74.543237°W
- Country: United States
- State: New Jersey
- County: Middlesex
- Township: South Brunswick

Area
  - Total: 4.41 sq mi (11.41 km^{2})
  - Land: 4.38 sq mi (11.35 km^{2})
  - Water: 0.027 sq mi (0.07 km^{2}) 1.03%
- Elevation: 79 ft (24 m)

Population (2020)
  - Total: 8,895
  - Density: 2,030.4/sq mi (783.9/km^{2})
- Time zone: UTC−05:00 (Eastern (EST))
  - Summer (DST): UTC−04:00 (Eastern (EDT))
- ZIP Code: 08852
- Area codes: 732/848
- FIPS code: 34-47190
- GNIS feature ID: 2389493

Monmouth Junction is an unincorporated community and census designated place (CDP) in South Brunswick, in Middlesex County, in the U.S. state of New Jersey. As of the 2020 census, the CDP's population was 8,895, up 208% from its population of 2,887 in 2010.

== Geography ==
Monmouth Junction is in southwestern Middlesex County, in the western part of South Brunswick. It is bordered to the northwest by Heathcote, to the northeast by Deans, and to the east by Dayton, all within South Brunswick as well. It is bordered to the southwest by Plainsboro Township. U.S. Route 1 forms a small part of the community's western border. New Brunswick, the Middlesex county seat, is 10 miles (16 km) to the northeast, and Trenton, the state capital, is 17 miles (27 km) to the southwest.

According to the United States Census Bureau, the Monmouth Junction CDP has an area of 4.41 square miles (11.42 km^{2}), nearly triple its area in 2010. Within the CDP, 4.38 square miles (11.34 km^{2}) are land and 0.025 square miles (0.065 km^{2}), or 0.57%, are water. Land in the community drains southwest toward Heathcote Brook and Devils Brook, tributaries of the Millstone River and part of the Raritan River watershed.

== Demographics ==
Historical population
Census	Pop.	Note	%±
1980	2,579		—
1990	1,570		−39.1%
2000	2,721		73.3%
2010	2,887		6.1%
2020	8,895		208.1%
Population sources: 1950 1960 1970; 1980 1990 2000; 2010 2020

Monmouth Junction first appeared as a census designated place in the 1980 U.S. census.

=== Racial and ethnic composition ===
Monmouth Junction CDP, New Jersey – Racial and ethnic composition Note: the US Census treats Hispanic/Latino as an ethnic category. This table excludes Latinos from the racial categories and assigns them to a separate category. Hispanics/Latinos may be of any race.
Race / Ethnicity (NH = Non-Hispanic)	Pop 2000	Pop 2010	Pop 2020	% 2000	% 2010	% 2020
White alone (NH)	1,972	1,568	2,426	72.47%	54.31%	27.27%
Black or African American alone (NH)	190	163	740	6.98%	5.65%	8.32%
Native American or Alaska Native alone (NH)	5	6	29	0.18%	0.21%	0.33%
Asian alone (NH)	394	949	5,110	14.48%	32.87%	57.45%
Native Hawaiian or Pacific Islander alone (NH)	0	0	1	0.00%	0.00%	0.01%
Other race alone (NH)	1	9	35	0.04%	0.31%	0.39%
Mixed race or Multiracial (NH)	46	49	150	1.69%	1.70%	1.69%
Hispanic or Latino (any race)	113	143	404	4.15%	4.95%	4.54%
Total	2,721	2,887	8,895	100.00%	100.00%	100.00%

=== 2020 census ===
As of the 2020 census, Monmouth Junction had a population of 8,895. The median age was 40.6 years. 24.1% of residents were under the age of 18 and 11.8% of residents were 65 years of age or older. For every 100 females there were 94.1 males, and for every 100 females age 18 and over there were 94.9 males age 18 and over.

99.8% of residents lived in urban areas, while 0.2% lived in rural areas.

There were 3,010 households in Monmouth Junction, of which 42.4% had children under the age of 18 living in them. Of all households, 70.9% were married-couple households, 9.2% were households with a male householder and no spouse or partner present, and 17.2% were households with a female householder and no spouse or partner present. About 13.9% of all households were made up of individuals and 4.8% had someone living alone who was 65 years of age or older.

There were 3,170 housing units, of which 5.0% were vacant. The homeowner vacancy rate was 1.2% and the rental vacancy rate was 9.8%.

=== 2010 census ===
The 2010 United States census counted 2,887 people, 903 households, and 801 families in the CDP. The population density was 1,966.3 people per square mile (759.2 people/km^{2}). There were 919 housing units at an average density of 625.9 units per square mile (241.7 units/km^{2}). The racial makeup was 57.40% (1,657) White, 6.03% (174) Black or African American, 0.24% (7) Native American, 32.91% (950) Asian, 0.00% (0) Pacific Islander, 0.97% (28) from other races, and 2.46% (71) from two or more races. Hispanic or Latino of any race were 4.95% (143) of the population.

Of the 903 households, 50.8% had children under the age of 18; 77.6% were married couples living together; 8.4% had a female householder with no husband present and 11.3% were non-families. Of all households, 9.9% were made up of individuals and 2.8% had someone living alone who was 65 years of age or older. The average household size was 3.20 and the average family size was 3.43.

29.1% of the population were under the age of 18, 7.1% from 18 to 24, 24.2% from 25 to 44, 32.0% from 45 to 64, and 7.6% who were 65 years of age or older. The median age was 38.8 years. For every 100 females, the population had 95.7 males. For every 100 females ages 18 and older there were 91.8 males.

=== 2000 census ===
As of the 2000 United States census there were 2,721 people, 870 households, and 736 families living in the CDP. The population density was 700.4 people/km^{2} (1,814 people/mi^{2}). There were 881 housing units at an average density of 226.8 units/km^{2} (587 units/mi^{2}). The racial makeup of the CDP was 74.97% White, 7.09% African American, 0.37% Native American, 14.48% Asian, 1.18% from other races, 1.91% from two or more races. Hispanic or Latino of any race were 4.15% of the population.

There were 870 households, out of which 53.4% had children under the age of 18 living with them, 73.4% were married couples living together, 9.1% had a female householder with no husband present, and 15.3% were non-families. 11.8% of all households were made up of individuals, and 1.8% had someone living alone who was 65 years of age or older. The average household size was 3.12 and the average family size was 3.42.

In the CDP the population was spread out, with 31.5% under the age of 18, 5.7% from 18 to 24, 34.8% from 25 to 44, 23.8% from 45 to 64, and 4.2% who were 65 years of age or older. The median age was 35 years. For every 100 females, there were 97.5 males. For every 100 females age 18 and over, there were 96.7 males.

The median income for a household in the CDP was $89,598, and the median income for a family was $94,247. Males had a median income of $64,688 versus $39,464 for females. The per capita income for the CDP was $35,134. About 4.2% of families and 5.1% of the population were below the poverty line, including 11.2% of those under age 18 and none of those age 65 or over.

== Education ==
South Brunswick Public Schools is the local school district.

== Religion ==
The Princeton Japanese Church (プリンストン日本語教会, Purinsuton Nihongo Kyōkai), serves the local Japanese community in Monmouth Junction. It was established in October 1991, and in 1993 had 20-25 attendees per Sunday church worship.

== Notable people ==
People who were born in, residents of, or otherwise closely associated with Monmouth Junction include:

- Walter Perez, weekend morning co-anchor, journalist and weekday reporter for WPVI-TV, the ABC network affiliate in Philadelphia
- Justin Shorter, American football wide receiver for the Buffalo Bills
- DeForest Soaries (born 1951), pastor, politician, former Secretary of State of New Jersey, and former chairman of the federal Election Assistance Commission

== See also ==
- Red Maple Farm
