= Suspense Magazine =

American fiction magazine

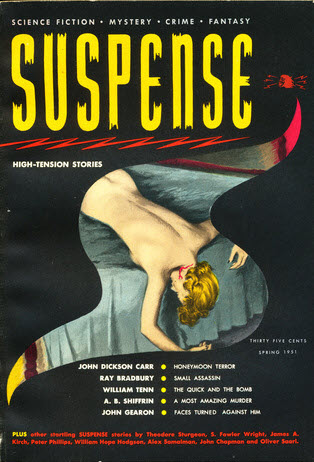
Cover of the first issue

Suspense Magazine was a fiction magazine which published four issues in 1951 and 1952. The editor was Theodore Irwin. The magazine included science fiction, fantasy, mystery, and weird fiction. Many of the stories were reprints, including science fiction from A.E. van Vogt, Ray Bradbury, and Theodore Sturgeon, and fantasy by William Hope Hodgson, Ambrose Bierce, and Arthur Quiller-Couch. The Fall 1951 issue included Fritz Leiber's "Dark Vengeance", a story in his Fafhrd and the Gray Mouser series.

== Bibliographic details ==
The publisher was Farrell Publishing Co. of Chicago, whose general manager, Arnold Abramson, later published the science fiction magazine Galaxy Science Fiction. The editor for all four issues was Theodore Irwin. The magazine appeared quarterly, from Spring 1951 to Winter 1952; there was one volume of four issues. Each issue was digest-sized, 128 pages, and was priced at 35 cents.

== Sources ==
- Anonymous (1985). "Suspense Magazine". In Tymn, Marshall B.; Ashley, Mike (eds.). Science Fiction, Fantasy and Weird Fiction Magazines. Westport, Connecticut: Greenwood Press. pp. 640–641. ISBN 0-3132-1221-X.
- McSherry, Frank D. (1983). "Suspense". In Cook, Michael L. (ed.). Mystery, Detective, and Espionage Magazines. Westport, Connecticut: Greenwood Press. pp. 550–552. ISBN 0-313-23310-1.
