= Madison Central High School (New Jersey) =

Former school in New Jersey, United States

Coordinates: 40.4311°N 74.2963°W

Madison Central High School is a defunct public high school in Old Bridge Township, in Middlesex County, in the U.S. state of New Jersey, that opened in 1962 and closed in June 1994.

Increasing numbers of students from Old Bridge attending Matawan High School led to double sessions in the 1960-61 school year, with the prospect of triple sessions being necessary as the growing number of students being sent from Old Bridge could swell enrollment even further beyond capacity. The school opened in 1962 as Madison Township High School, serving freshman and sophomores, while those in their junior and senior years continued to attend East Brunswick High School, Keyport High School, Matawan High School or South River High School as part of sending/receiving relationships. Cedar Ridge High School opened in 1968 to help alleviate overcrowding at Madison Central. Old Bridge High School opened in September 1994 and was formed from the merger of Cedar Ridge and Madison Central, which were the two existing high schools in Old Bridge Township.

The school had an enrollment of 1,210 in the 1990-1991 school year, slightly larger than the student body at Cedar Ridge.

== Athletics ==
The football team won the Central Jersey Group IV state sectional championship in 1973, 1987 and 1988. The team had a perfect 11-0 season in 1973, winning the Central Jersey Group IV state sectional championship. The team finished the 1988 season with an 11-0 record and was ranked 11th in the nation by USA Today after winning the Central Jersey Group IV sectional title with a 20-6 win against Middletown High School South in the championship game.

The boys' wrestling team won the Group IV state championship in 1990.

== Notable alumni ==
- Steve Corodemus (born 1952, class of 1970), politician who served in the New Jersey General Assembly from 1992–2008, where he represented the 11th Legislative District
- Fabian Nicieza (born 1961, class of 1979), writer and co-creator of Deadpool for Marvel Comics
- Mark Schlissel (born 1957), president of the University of Michigan from 2014 to 2022
- Jordan Zimmerman (born 1955, class of 1975), founder of Zimmerman Advertising, former co-owner of NHL's Florida Panthers
