= Cedar Ridge High School (New Jersey) =

Defunct high school in Middlesex County, New Jersey, United States

Coordinates: 40.4078°N 74.2707°W

Cedar Ridge High School is a defunct public high school in Old Bridge Township, in Middlesex County, in the U.S. state of New Jersey, that opened in 1968 and closed in June 1994.

The school opened in 1968 as part of an effort to address overcrowding at Madison Central High School. Old Bridge High School opened in September 1994 and was formed from the merger of Cedar Ridge and Madison Central, which were the two existing high schools in Old Bridge Township.

The school had an enrollment of 1,150 in the 1990–1991 school year, slightly less than the student body at Madison Central.

== Athletics ==
The school's football team had a perfect 9–0 season in 1973—one of three winning seasons in 25 years—and was recognized by the New Jersey State Interscholastic Athletic Association as the Central Jersey Group IV state sectional champion in the final year in which champions were awarded by the NJSIAA (rather than based on playoffs). The team was ranked second in the state by The Star-Ledger.

The girls' gymnastics team won the team state championship in 1983 and 1984.

The boys' cross country team won the Group III state championship in 1990 and 1991.

== Notable alumni ==
- Junot Díaz (born 1968), Dominican American writer, creative writing professor at Massachusetts Institute of Technology (MIT), and fiction editor at Boston Review.
- Doug Emhoff (born 1964), lawyer and second gentleman of the United States.
- Owen Henry (born 1959), politician who represents the 12th legislative district in the New Jersey Senate since January 2024
- Franklin Lawson, retired soccer player who played professionally in the American Soccer League and the United Soccer League.
- Caren Lissner (born 1973), novelist, essayist and newspaper editor, whose published novels include Carrie Pilby (2003).
- Tammy Lynn Sytch (born 1972), commonly known by her ring name "Sunny," a former professional wrestling manager, valet, ring announcer, and adult entertainer.
- Vitamin C (born 1969), singer / songwriter best known for her song Graduation (Friends Forever) and actress who appeared in the 1988 film Hairspray.
