= Carrie Pilby =

Book by Caren Lissner

Carrie Pilby is a coming-of-age novel by Caren Lissner, first published by Red Dress Ink in 2003, then re-released on July 1, 2010 for teenage readers under the new imprint Harlequin Teen. It was among the first novels published by Harlequin Enterprises's Red Dress Ink imprint.

In its first incarnation, Carrie Pilby was noted in various newspaper articles as one of the smarter and more original novels in the genre. It proved successful, selling more than 50,000 copies. Neil Genzlinger of The New York Times referred to the novel as "hilarious" in an August 10, 2003 story. After the chick lit market became saturated, Harlequin stopped publishing novels under the Red Dress Ink imprint in 2009, but Carrie Pilby was selected to be re-published on July 1, 2010 as one of the first books in the new Harlequin Teen line for teenagers. It was republished with a new cover for teens and some of the technology referred to in the novel was slightly modernized (Carrie was now renting DVDs instead of videos). The novel was released in France on June 1, 2010 as one of the first four titles released under the French Harlequin imprint for teens, Darkiss.

== Plot summary ==
Carrie Pilby's eponymous main character is a 19-year-old genius who graduated early from Harvard College and has no idea how to fit in, date, or talk to other people after college. She believes the majority of people in her hometown, New York City, to be sex-obsessed, immoral, and hypocrites. She felt the same way about students who did dangerous things in college, like drinking to excess and having sex, and as a result felt very isolated, although she confesses that she reluctantly lost her virginity to a professor there. Her therapist in New York gives her a five-point plan to test her very black-and-white beliefs, including forcing herself to go on blind dates and attend parties. She meets a cast of characters who challenge her beliefs, and she even becomes attracted to a man whose views she detests. Ultimately, the main character faces this universal coming-of-age question: Which tradeoffs, if any, are acceptable in order to fit in?

== Background ==
Lissner wrote the novel in 2000, after an experience at a video store:

One day I went to rent a video at Take One Video on Washington Street, a fun little store that had all kinds of indie films. The guy offered me a bag for my video, and I thought of a whole rant about not wanting people to see what I was renting. At the time, I was new to single life in the city and spent several Friday nights watching movies in my apartment, so I turned my rant into a story about a hyperverbal yet socially awkward young woman who's new to the big city and isn't quite sure how to date and make friends. The story came to me rather quickly, but I always do a lot of revisions to my writing. So after I spent almost a year writing it, I did a lot of tweaks.

== Film adaptation ==
On June 17, 2013, it was announced in Variety that a trio of successful female producers in Hollywood were set to turn the novel into a film, to be directed by Susan Johnson, with initial seed money coming from a Kickstarter campaign (see film web page at external links below).

On January 9, 2015, the Hollywood Reporter broke the story that Oscar-nominated actress Hailee Steinfeld would play the lead character. A slew of positive articles followed, sometimes noting the all-female production team and female screenwriter during a time when Hollywood movies are usually helmed by men. Steinfeld ultimately dropped out due to scheduling conflicts, and indie film star Bel Powley replaced her. Other actors were cast in the film, including Gabriel Byrne, starring as Carrie's father, and Nathan Lane as her therapist. On March 31, 2017, the film opened in limited release at six U.S. theaters, and became available on Amazon, iTunes, and some cable on-demand services the following week on April 4, 2017. It was the top independent iTunes movie rental for the first three weeks of its release, then dropped to third place in its fourth week of release.
