= Caren Lissner =

American novelist

- Born: February 13, 1973 (age 53); Elizabeth, New Jersey, U.S.
- Education: Cedar Ridge High School; University of Pennsylvania (BA)
- Occupations: Novelist; essayist; newspaper editor
- Website: carenlissner.com

Caren Lissner (born February 13, 1973) is an American novelist, essayist, and newspaper editor. Her published novels include Carrie Pilby (2003) and Starting from Square Two (2004).

== Early life ==
Caren Lissner was born on February 13, 1973, in Elizabeth, New Jersey. She grew up in Freehold Township, New Jersey, and attended Laura Donovan School and Barkalow Middle School. She graduated from Cedar Ridge High School in Old Bridge Township, New Jersey. She holds a BA in English from the University of Pennsylvania, which she attended from 1989 to 1993. While there, she wrote for the student newspaper, the Daily Pennsylvanian, and was a member of the Philomathean Society.

== Career ==
Lissner has published essays, articles, and satire in The New York Times, The Philadelphia Inquirer, The Atlantic, and McSweeney's Internet Tendency. She served as editor-in-chief of the Hudson Reporter group of newspapers based in Hudson County, New Jersey. Her novel Carrie Pilby was re-released July 1, 2010, by Harlequin Teen and was made into an independent film of the same name starring Bel Powley and Nathan Lane. The film premiered in 2016, was released to theaters in March 2017, and then ran on Netflix from 2018-2023. Lissner is currently a staff reporter for Patch focusing on the news of Hoboken, NJ. She is also working on a memoir about her experience of being homeless while attending the University of Pennsylvania.
