= Ten Mile Run, New Jersey =

Populated place in Somerset County, New Jersey, US

- Census-designated place
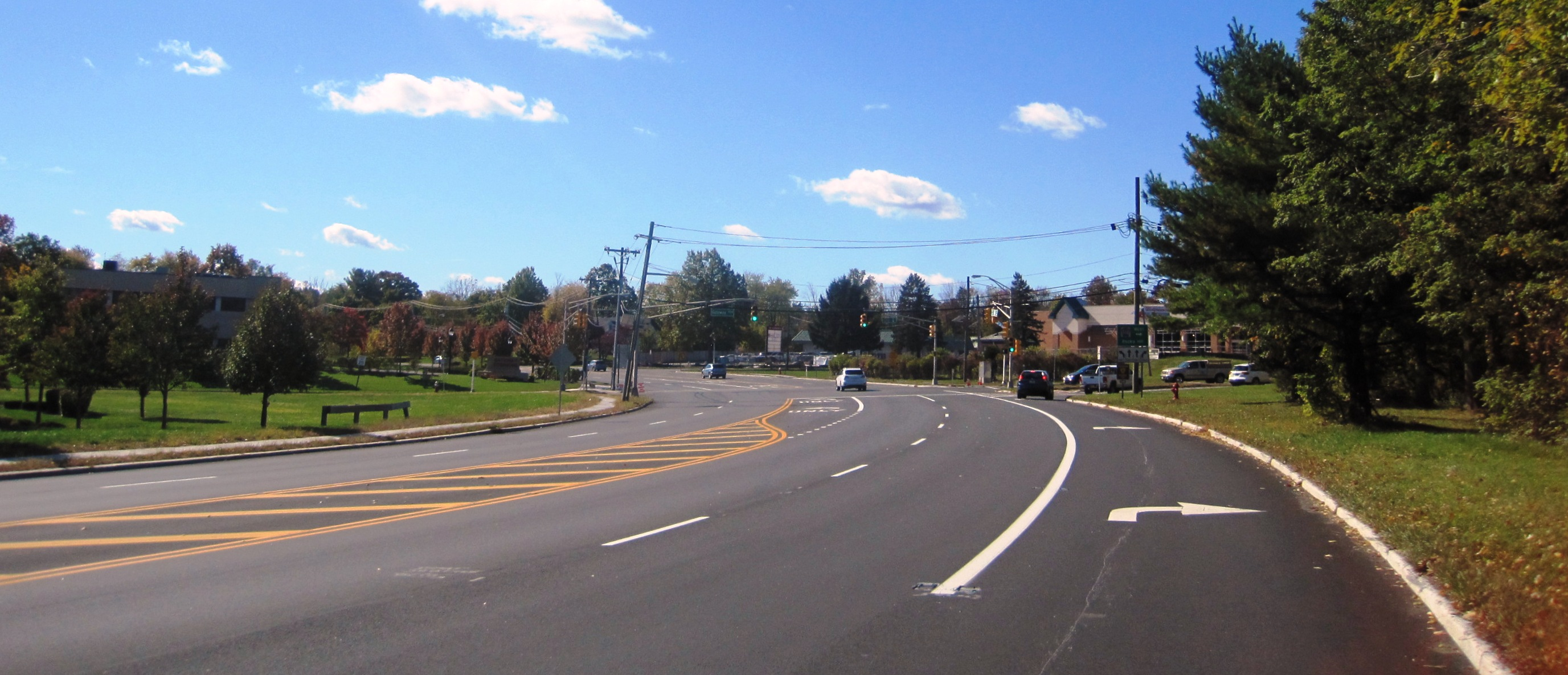
- Location of Ten Mile Run at the intersection of Route 27 and CR 518

- Location in Somerset County Location in New Jersey Location in the United States
- Coordinates: 40.424136°N 74.586348°W
- Country: United States
- State: New Jersey
- County: Somerset
- Township: Franklin

Area
  - Total: 2.54 sq mi (6.58 km^{2})
  - Land: 2.54 sq mi (6.58 km^{2})
  - Water: 0 sq mi (0.00 km^{2}) 0.04%
- Elevation: 213 ft (65 m)

Population (2020)
  - Total: 2,055
  - Density: 809/sq mi (312.5/km^{2})
- Time zone: UTC−05:00 (Eastern (EST))
  - Summer (DST): UTC−04:00 (Eastern (EDT))
- Area codes: 609/640 and 732/848
- FIPS code: 34-72435
- GNIS feature ID: 02584033

Ten Mile Run is an unincorporated community and census-designated place (CDP) located in Franklin Township, in Somerset County, in the U.S. state of New Jersey. As of the 2020 census, Ten Mile Run had a population of 2,055.

== Geography ==
According to the United States Census Bureau, Ten Mile Run had a total area of 2.539 square miles (6.576 km^{2}), including 2.538 square miles (6.573 km^{2}) of land and 0.001 square miles (0.002 km^{2}) of water (0.04%).

The area is named for the Ten Mile Run, a stream of the same name the hill on which it sits (part of the Rocky Hill Ridge). The area is located along Route 27 (Lincoln Highway) near its intersection with County Route 518. It is located across Route 27 from South Brunswick, Middlesex County. Most of the area consists of less densely-spaced single family homes throughout and commercial establishments along Route 27. The remainder of the area is forested and hilly as the terrain descends towards the Delaware and Raritan Canal and Millstone River. Kendall Park, the CDP located on the South Brunswick side of Route 27, consists of more densely-spaced homes.

== Demographics ==
Historical population
Census	Pop.	Note	%±
2010	1,959		—
2020	2,055		4.9%
Population sources: 2010

Ten Mile Run first appeared as a census designated place in the 2010 U.S. census.

=== Racial and ethnic composition ===
Ten Mile Run CDP, New Jersey – Racial and ethnic composition Note: the US Census treats Hispanic/Latino as an ethnic category. This table excludes Latinos from the racial categories and assigns them to a separate category. Hispanics/Latinos may be of any race.
Race / Ethnicity (NH = Non-Hispanic)	Pop 2010	Pop 2020	% 2010	% 2020
White alone (NH)	568	488	28.99%	23.75%
Black or African American alone (NH)	225	210	11.49%	10.22%
Native American or Alaska Native alone (NH)	1	2	0.05%	0.10%
Asian alone (NH)	989	1,192	50.48%	58.00%
Native Hawaiian or Pacific Islander alone (NH)	0	0	0.00%	0.00%
Other race alone (NH)	1	5	0.05%	0.24%
Mixed race or Multiracial (NH)	51	45	2.60%	2.19%
Hispanic or Latino (any race)	124	113	6.33%	5.50%
Total	1,959	2,055	100.00%	100.00%

=== 2020 census ===
As of the 2020 census, Ten Mile Run had a population of 2,055. The median age was 42.5 years. 23.9% of residents were under the age of 18 and 15.2% of residents were 65 years of age or older. For every 100 females there were 106.1 males, and for every 100 females age 18 and over there were 100.8 males age 18 and over.

76.2% of residents lived in urban areas, while 23.8% lived in rural areas.

There were 637 households in Ten Mile Run, of which 38.6% had children under the age of 18 living in them. Of all households, 77.9% were married-couple households, 8.9% were households with a male householder and no spouse or partner present, and 10.0% were households with a female householder and no spouse or partner present. About 11.2% of all households were made up of individuals and 4.3% had someone living alone who was 65 years of age or older.

There were 660 housing units, of which 3.5% were vacant. The homeowner vacancy rate was 0.3% and the rental vacancy rate was 8.8%.

=== 2010 census ===
The 2010 United States census counted 1,959 people, 602 households, and 514 families in the CDP. The population density was 771.9 per square mile (298.0/km^{2}). There were 622 housing units at an average density of 245.1 per square mile (94.6/km^{2}). The racial makeup was 31.85% (624) White, 11.94% (234) Black or African American, 0.05% (1) Native American, 50.54% (990) Asian, 0.00% (0) Pacific Islander, 2.30% (45) from other races, and 3.32% (65) from two or more races. Hispanic or Latino of any race were 6.33% (124) of the population.

Of the 602 households, 49.8% had children under the age of 18; 79.6% were married couples living together; 3.8% had a female householder with no husband present and 14.6% were non-families. Of all households, 10.1% were made up of individuals and 3.2% had someone living alone who was 65 years of age or older. The average household size was 3.25 and the average family size was 3.53.

29.4% of the population were under the age of 18, 3.5% from 18 to 24, 33.9% from 25 to 44, 24.9% from 45 to 64, and 8.3% who were 65 years of age or older. The median age was 37.0 years. For every 100 females, the population had 105.3 males. For every 100 females ages 18 and older there were 103.2 males.
