= Little Rocky Hill, New Jersey =

Populated place in Middlesex County, New Jersey, US

- Unincorporated community
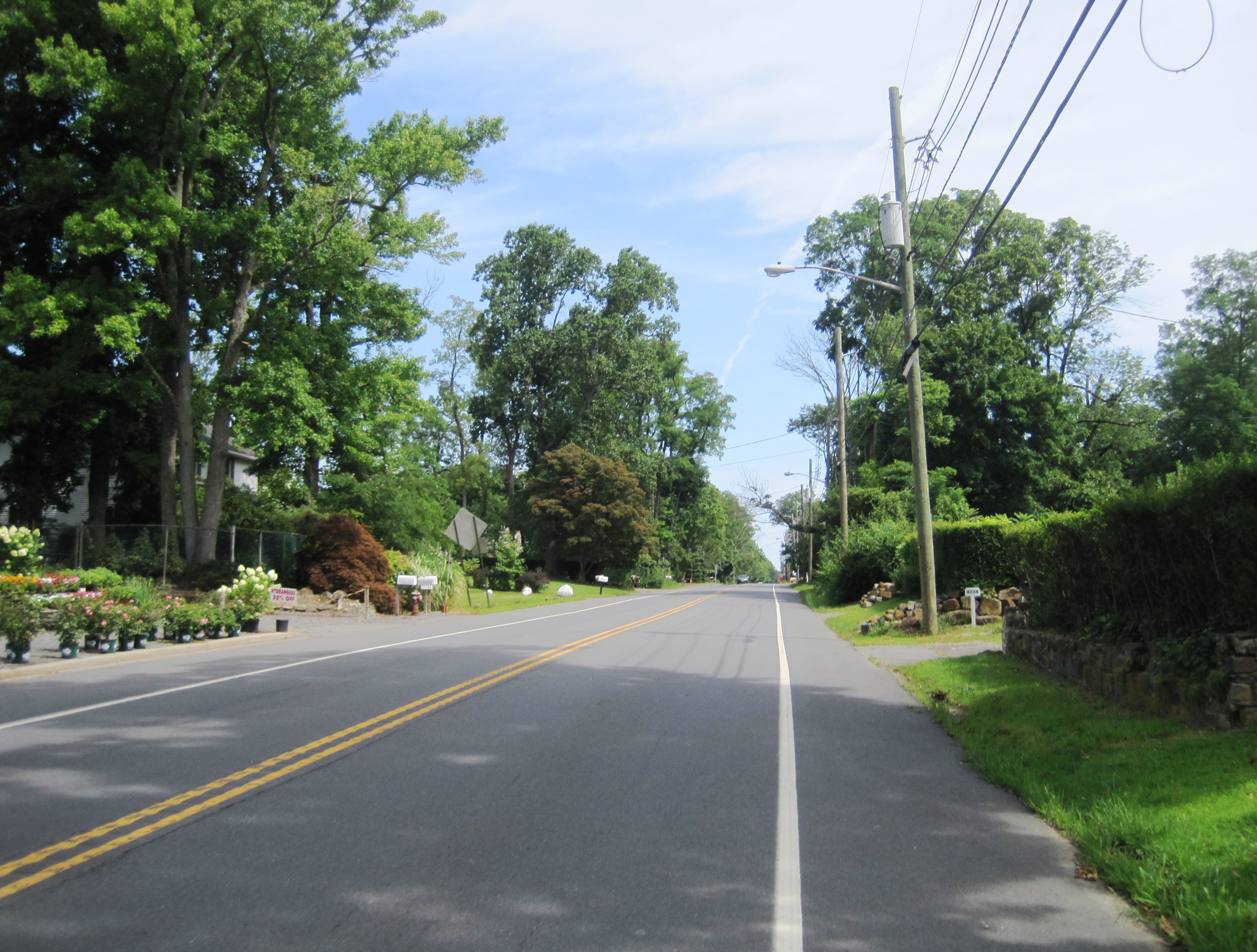
- Photo looking north along Route 27

- Location in Middlesex County Little Rocky Hill (New Jersey) Little Rocky Hill (the United States)
- Coordinates: 40°23′51″N 74°35′20″W
- Country: United States
- State: New Jersey
- County: Middlesex, Somerset
- Township: South Brunswick, Franklin
- Elevation: 249 ft (76 m)
- GNIS feature ID: 877856

Little Rocky Hill is an unincorporated community located within South Brunswick in Middlesex County and Franklin Township, Somerset County, in the U.S. state of New Jersey. The community is located atop a small hill east of the borough of Rocky Hill. The Middlesex–Somerset county line runs through the community along Old Road though elsewhere it follows Route 27. Carters Brook runs through the area flowing south.
