= Fresh Ponds, New Jersey =

Populated place in Middlesex County, New Jersey, US

- Unincorporated community
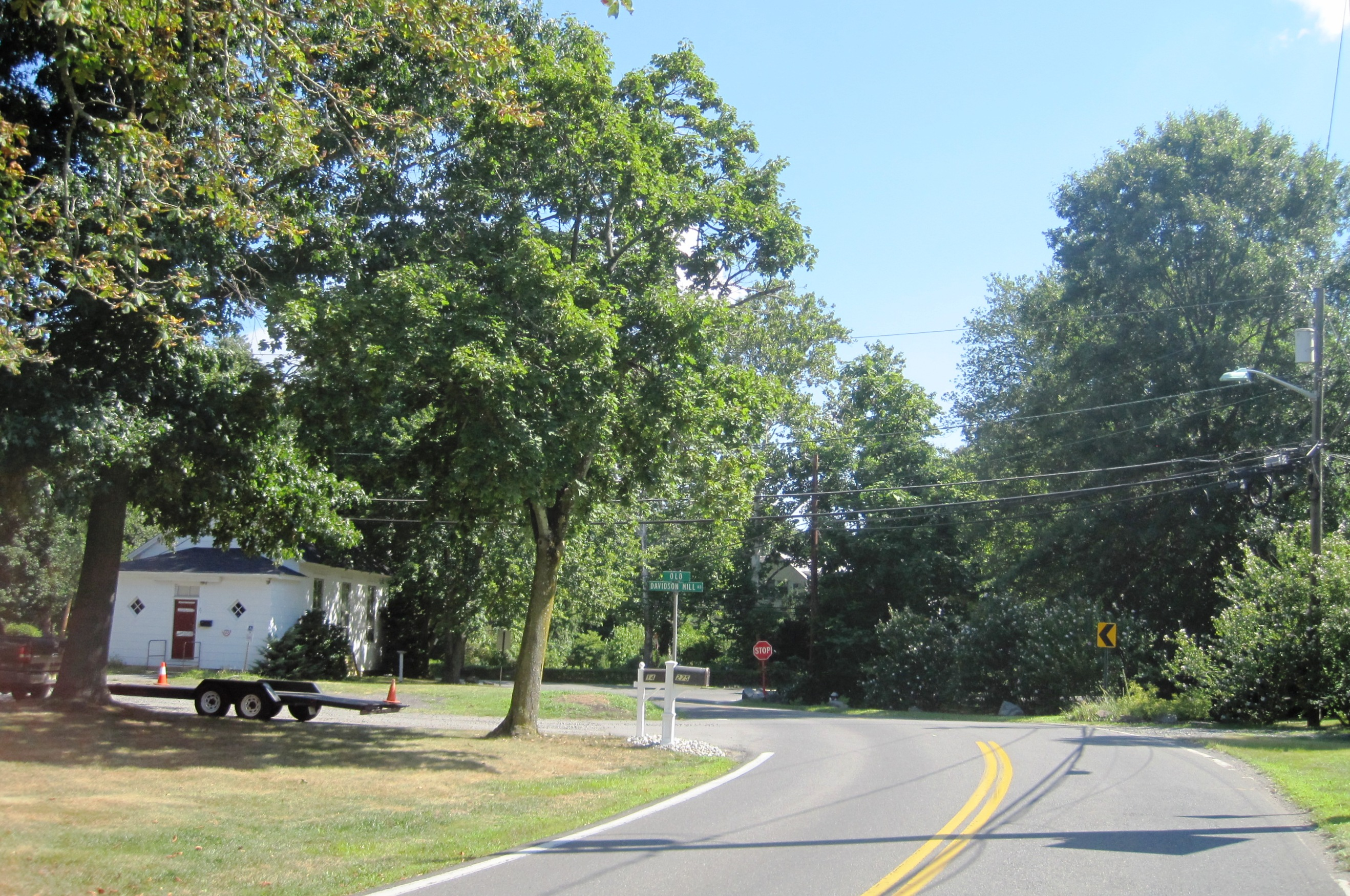
- Along Fresh Ponds Road

- Location within Middlesex County, New Jersey Location within New Jersey Location within the United States
- Coordinates: 40°24′19″N 74°27′57″W
- Country: United States
- State: New Jersey
- County: Middlesex
- Township: South Brunswick
- Elevation: 102 ft (31 m)
- GNIS feature ID: 876516

Fresh Ponds is an unincorporated community located within South Brunswick Township in Middlesex County, in the U.S. state of New Jersey. It is located in a rural portion of the township at the intersection of Fresh Ponds Road and Davidson Mill Road. Forest land, farms, homes, and a church are located around the settlement.
