= Kendall Park, New Jersey =

Populated place in Middlesex County, New Jersey, US

- Census-designated place
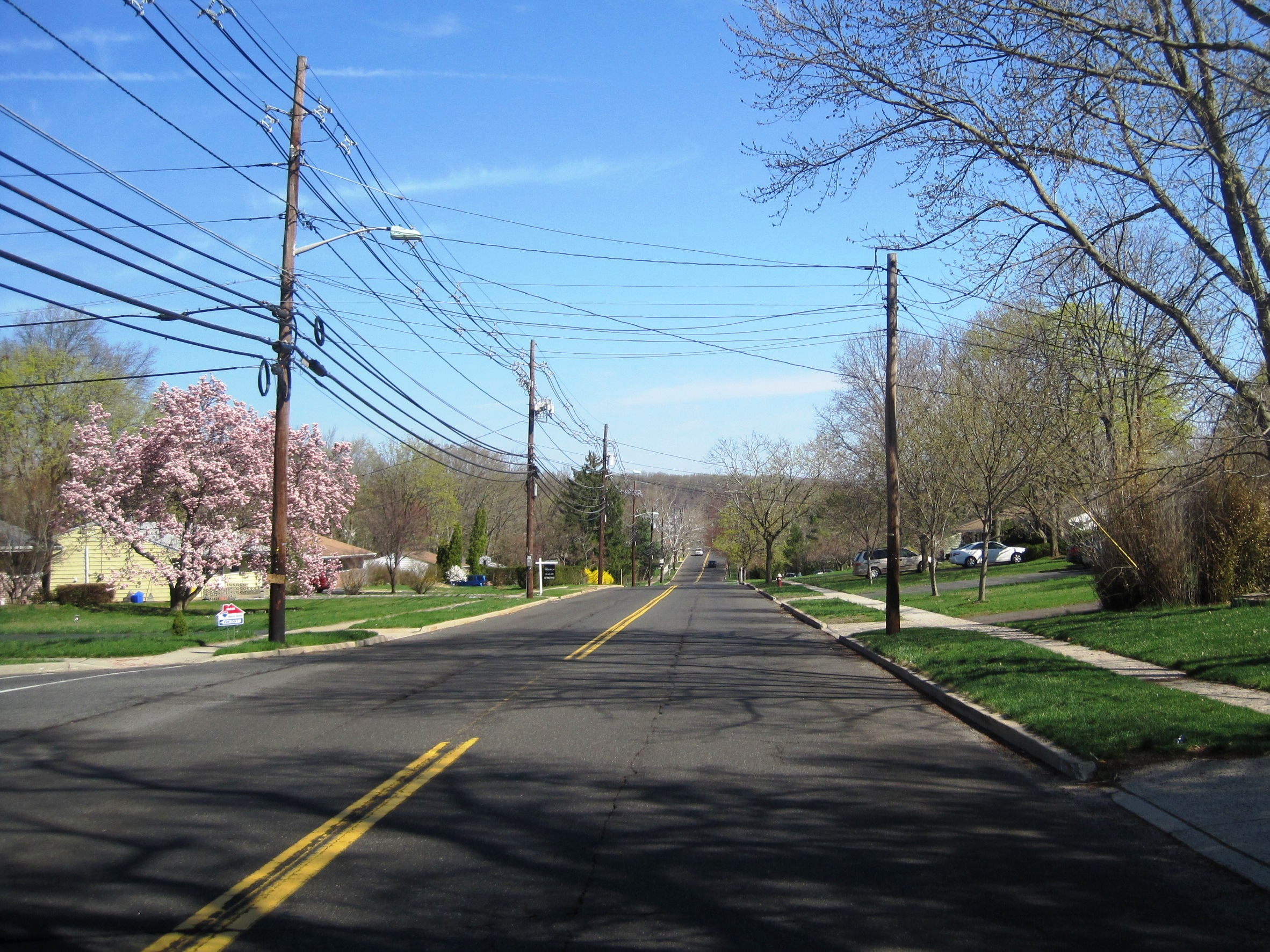
- Kendall Park along New Road

- Map of Kendall Park CDP in Middlesex County. Inset: Location of Middlesex County in New Jersey.

- Location in Middlesex County Location in New Jersey Location in the United States
- Coordinates: 40.413404°N 74.562457°W
- Country: United States
- State: New Jersey
- County: Middlesex
- Township: South Brunswick
- Named for: Herbert Kendall

Area
  - Total: 3.78 sq mi (9.80 km^{2})
  - Land: 3.78 sq mi (9.79 km^{2})
  - Water: 0.0039 sq mi (0.01 km^{2}) 0.06%
- Elevation: 184 ft (56 m)

Population (2020)
  - Total: 9,989
  - Density: 2,642.6/sq mi (1,020.3/km^{2})
- Time zone: UTC−05:00 (Eastern (EST))
  - Summer (DST): UTC−04:00 (Eastern (EDT))
- ZIP Codes: 08824 (Kendall Park); 08852 (Monmouth Junction)
- Area codes: 732/848
- FIPS code: 34-30738
- GNIS feature ID: 02389913

Kendall Park is an unincorporated community and census-designated place (CDP) in South Brunswick, Middlesex County, New Jersey, United States. As of the 2020 census, the CDP's population was 9,989, up from 9,339 in 2010. Kendall Park has a post office with its own ZIP Code (08824) that encompasses the majority of the CDP, as well as some surrounding areas.

== History ==
Kendall Park gets its name from its builder, Herbert Kendall, who developed a planned community of 1,500 houses between 1956 and 1961. Kendall's development was built in three stages: the initial development in 1956-7 (between New Road and Sand Hill Road), the Constable development in 1959 (south of New Road), followed by the Greenbrook development (north of Sand Hill Road) in 1961. The initial development offered two styles of three-bedroom, 1½ bath ranch-style homes, mostly built on 1/3 acre lots, typically selling for around $16,000 in 1957. The subsequent sections offered a wider selection of styles, including four-bedroom ranches and four-bedroom colonial-style homes. The development of Kendall Park doubled the population of South Brunswick and marked the beginning of its transformation from a rural farming area to a suburban bedroom community. Several other nearby tracts developed after Kendall's original development are also part of the CDP.

The Hoagland-Clark House, which dates back to the late 18th century, is a remnant of the earlier era, and was identified by Preservation New Jersey as one of the most vulnerable landmarks in New Jersey.

== Geography ==
Kendall Park is in southwestern Middlesex County, in the northwest part of South Brunswick. It is bordered to the south by Heathcote, also within South Brunswick, and to the west and northwest by the communities of Ten Mile Run and Franklin Park in Franklin Township, Somerset County.

New Jersey Route 27 (Lincoln Highway) runs along the northwest border of Kendall Park, following the county line, while U.S. Route 1 runs along the community's southeast border. Both highways lead northeast 7 miles (11 km) to New Brunswick, the Middlesex county seat. Route 27 leads southwest from Kendall Park 8 miles (13 km) to Princeton, while Route 1 leads southwest 17 miles (27 km) to Trenton, the state capital.

According to the U.S. Census Bureau, the Kendall Park CDP has a total area of 3.782 square miles (9.80 km^{2}), of which 0.002 square miles (0.0052 km^{2}), or 0.05%, are water. The community sits on high ground which drains north to Tenmile Run and Sixmile Run, and south to Heathcote Brook, all of which are tributaries of the Millstone River and part of the Raritan River watershed.

== Demographics ==
Historical population
Census	Pop.	Note	%±
1970	7,412		—
1980	7,419		0.1%
1990	7,127		−3.9%
2000	9,006		26.4%
2010	9,339		3.7%
2020	9,989		7.0%
Population sources: 1950 1960 1970; 1980 1990 2000; 2010 2020

Kendall Park was listed as an unincorporated community in the 1970 U.S. census; and then as a census designated place in the 1980 United States census.

=== Racial and ethnic composition ===
Kendall Park CDP, New Jersey – Racial and ethnic composition Note: the US Census treats Hispanic/Latino as an ethnic category. This table excludes Latinos from the racial categories and assigns them to a separate category. Hispanics/Latinos may be of any race.
Race / Ethnicity (NH = Non-Hispanic)	Pop 2000	Pop 2010	Pop 2020	% 2000	% 2010	% 2020
White alone (NH)	6,864	5,700	4,401	76.22%	61.03%	44.06%
Black or African American alone (NH)	403	463	497	4.47%	4.96%	4.98%
Native American or Alaska Native alone (NH)	1	17	11	0.01%	0.18%	0.11%
Asian alone (NH)	1,185	2,340	3,657	13.16%	25.06%	36.61%
Native Hawaiian or Pacific Islander alone (NH)	5	1	2	0.06%	0.01%	0.02%
Other race alone (NH)	16	11	39	0.18%	0.12%	0.39%
Mixed race or Multiracial (NH)	141	174	317	1.57%	1.86%	3.17%
Hispanic or Latino (any race)	391	633	1,065	4.34%	6.78%	10.66%
Total	9,006	9,339	9,989	100.00%	100.00%	100.00%

=== 2020 census ===
As of the 2020 census, Kendall Park had a population of 9,989. The median age was 42.2 years. 22.8% of residents were under the age of 18 and 13.6% were 65 years of age or older. For every 100 females, there were 95.6 males, and for every 100 females age 18 and over, there were 94.2 males age 18 and over.

99.8% of residents lived in urban areas, while 0.2% lived in rural areas.

There were 3,233 households, of which 39.6% had children under the age of 18 living in them. Of all households, 68.9% were married-couple households, 9.9% were households with a male householder and no spouse or partner present, and 17.9% were households with a female householder and no spouse or partner present. About 15.1% of all households were made up of individuals and 7.6% had someone living alone who was 65 years of age or older.

There were 3,315 housing units, of which 2.5% were vacant. The homeowner vacancy rate was 1.0% and the rental vacancy rate was 2.9%.

=== 2010 census ===
The 2010 United States census counted 9,339 people, 3,135 households, and 2,508 families in the CDP. The population density was 2,522.6 people per square mile (974.0 people/km^{2}). There were 3,198 housing units at an average density of 863.8 units per square mile (333.5 units/km^{2}). The racial makeup was 65.48% (6,115) White, 5.21% (487) Black or African American, 0.18% (17) Native American, 25.08% (2,342) Asian, 0.02% (2) Pacific Islander, 1.73% (162) from other races, and 2.29% (214) from two or more races. Hispanic or Latino of any race were 6.78% (633) of the population.

Of the 3,135 households, 43.7% had children under the age of 18; 68.5% were married couples living together; 8.6% had a female householder with no husband present and 20.0% were non-families. Of all households, 17.2% were made up of individuals and 8.1% had someone living alone who was 65 years of age or older. The average household size was 2.98 and the average family size was 3.39.

27.7% of the population were under the age of 18, 6.6% from 18 to 24, 23.6% from 25 to 44, 30.3% from 45 to 64, and 11.8% who were 65 years of age or older. The median age was 40.5 years. For every 100 females, the population had 93.5 males. For every 100 females ages 18 and older there were 91.9 males.

=== 2000 census ===
As of the 2000 United States census there were 9,006 people, 3,013 households, and 2,431 families residing in the CDP. The population density was 934.7 people/km^{2} (2,421 people/mi^{2}). There were 3,094 housing units at an average density of 321.1 units/km^{2} (832 units/mi^{2}). The racial makeup of the CDP was 79.31% White, 4.53% African American, 0.02% Native American, 13.19% Asian, 0.06% Pacific Islander, 0.97% from other races, and 1.92% from two or more races. Hispanic or Latino of any race were 4.34% of the population.

There were 3,013 households, out of which 45.4% had children under the age of 18 living with them, 69.7% were married couples living together, 7.6% had a female householder with no husband present, and 19.3% were non-families. 16.4% of all households were made up of individuals, and 7.7% had someone living alone who was 65 years of age or older. The average household size was 2.99 and the average family size was 3.37.

In the CDP the population was spread out, with 29.9% under the age of 18, 5.3% from 18 to 24, 32.4% from 25 to 44, 21.6% from 45 to 64, and 10.8% who were 65 years of age or older. The median age was 36 years. For every 100 females, there were 94.9 males. For every 100 females age 18 and over, there were 92.3 males.

The median income for a household in the CDP was $74,438, and the median income for a family was $82,324. Males had a median income of $59,955 versus $40,146 for females. The per capita income for the CDP was $26,986. About 2.0% of families and 2.9% of the population were below the poverty line, including 2.1% of those under age 18 and 9.8% of those age 65 or over.

== Education ==
Cambridge, Constable, Greenbrook, and Brunswick Acres are all elementary schools located within Kendall Park that are part of the South Brunswick Public Schools.

St. Augustine of Canterbury School is a PreK-8 elementary school operating under the auspices of the Roman Catholic Diocese of Metuchen. In 2016, the school was one of ten schools in New Jersey, and one of private schools, recognized as a National Blue Ribbon School by the United States Department of Education, a recognition celebrating excellence in academics.
