= Sand Hills, New Jersey =

Sand Hills, New Jersey may refer to:

- Sand Hills, Edison and Woodbridge, New Jersey
- Sand Hills, South Brunswick, New Jersey
