= Heathcote, New Jersey =

Populated place in Middlesex County, New Jersey, US

- Census-designated place
- Map of Heathcote CDP in Middlesex County. Inset: Location of Middlesex County in New Jersey.

- Location in Middlesex County Location in New Jersey Location in the United States
- Coordinates: 40.389933°N 74.572931°W
- Country: United States
- State: New Jersey
- County: Middlesex
- Township: South Brunswick

Area
  - Total: 3.14 sq mi (8.13 km^{2})
  - Land: 3.14 sq mi (8.12 km^{2})
  - Water: 0.0039 sq mi (0.01 km^{2}) 0.27%
- Elevation: 184 ft (56 m)

Population (2020)
  - Total: 7,154
  - Density: 2,282/sq mi (881.1/km^{2})
- Time zone: UTC−05:00 (Eastern (EST))
  - Summer (DST): UTC−04:00 (Eastern (EDT))
- ZIP Codes: 08540 (Princeton); 08852 (Monmouth Junction); 08824 (Kendall Park)
- FIPS code: 34-30738
- GNIS feature ID: 02389913

Heathcote is an unincorporated community and census-designated place (CDP) in South Brunswick Township, Middlesex County, New Jersey, United States. As of the 2020 census, the population of the CDP was 7,154, up from 5,821 in 2010.

== Geography ==
Heathcote is in southwestern Middlesex County, in the western part of South Brunswick Township. It is bordered to the north by Kendall Park, to the south by Monmouth Junction, to the southwest by Kingston, and to the northwest by East Rocky Hill. The northwest boundary of Heathcote follows the Somerset County line.

U.S. Route 1 passes through the eastern side of Heathcote, leading northeast 10 miles (16 km) to New Brunswick, the Middlesex county seat, and southwest 16 miles (26 km) to Trenton, the state capital. New Jersey Route 27 (Lincoln Highway) runs along the northwestern edge of Heathcote, forming the county line in places. Route 27 leads northeast to New Brunswick and southwest 5 miles (8 km) to Princeton borough. County Route 522 (Promenade Boulevard) runs east–west through Heathcote, connecting Routes 1 and 27.

According to the U.S. Census Bureau, the Heathcote CDP has an area of 3.14 square miles (8.13 km^{2}), including 0.005 square miles (0.013 km^{2}) of water (0.16%). The community lies on a slope that drains south toward Heathcote Brook, a west-flowing tributary of the Millstone River, part of the Raritan River watershed.

== Demographics ==
Historical population
Census	Pop.	Note	%±
1990	3,112		—
2000	4,755		52.8%
2010	5,821		22.4%
2020	7,154		22.9%
Population sources: 1950 1960 1970; 1980 1990 2000; 2010 2020

Heathcote first appeared as a census designated place in the 1990 U.S. census.

=== Racial and ethnic composition ===
Heathcote CDP, New Jersey – Racial and ethnic composition Note: the US Census treats Hispanic/Latino as an ethnic category. This table excludes Latinos from the racial categories and assigns them to a separate category. Hispanics/Latinos may be of any race.
Race / Ethnicity (NH = Non-Hispanic)	Pop 2000	Pop 2010	Pop 2020	% 2000	% 2010	% 2020
White alone (NH)	3,163	2,631	2,315	66.52%	45.20%	32.36%
Black or African American alone (NH)	507	525	580	10.66%	9.02%	8.11%
Native American or Alaska Native alone (NH)	3	7	8	0.06%	0.12%	0.11%
Asian alone (NH)	780	2,162	3,639	16.40%	37.14%	50.87%
Native Hawaiian or Pacific Islander alone (NH)	0	5	1	0.00%	0.09%	0.01%
Other race alone (NH)	8	13	21	0.17%	0.22%	0.29%
Mixed race or Multiracial (NH)	87	141	177	1.83%	2.42%	2.47%
Hispanic or Latino (any race)	207	337	413	4.35%	5.79%	5.77%
Total	4,755	5,821	7,154	100.00%	100.00%	100.00%

=== 2020 census ===
As of the 2020 census, Heathcote had a population of 7,154. The median age was 43.2 years. 21.6% of residents were under the age of 18 and 17.7% of residents were 65 years of age or older. For every 100 females there were 90.8 males, and for every 100 females age 18 and over there were 86.0 males age 18 and over.

99.8% of residents lived in urban areas, while 0.2% lived in rural areas.

There were 2,731 households in Heathcote, of which 35.0% had children under the age of 18 living in them. Of all households, 59.0% were married-couple households, 11.2% were households with a male householder and no spouse or partner present, and 26.3% were households with a female householder and no spouse or partner present. About 24.2% of all households were made up of individuals and 10.9% had someone living alone who was 65 years of age or older.

There were 2,868 housing units, of which 4.8% were vacant. The homeowner vacancy rate was 2.1% and the rental vacancy rate was 8.1%.

=== 2010 census ===
The 2010 United States census counted 5,821 people, 2,326 households, and 1,558 families in the CDP. The population density was 2,252.2 people per square mile (869.6 people/km^{2}). There were 2,427 housing units at an average density of 939.0 units per square mile (362.5 units/km^{2}). The racial makeup was 48.82% (2,842) White, 9.65% (562) Black or African American, 0.12% (7) Native American, 37.21% (2,166) Asian, 0.09% (5) Pacific Islander, 1.22% (71) from other races, and 2.89% (168) from two or more races. Hispanic or Latino of any race were 5.79% (337) of the population.

Of the 2,326 households, 35.6% had children under the age of 18; 55.4% were married couples living together; 9.3% had a female householder with no husband present and 33.0% were non-families. Of all households, 27.7% were made up of individuals and 7.1% had someone living alone who was 65 years of age or older. The average household size was 2.50 and the average family size was 3.12.

Of the population, 24.7% were under the age of 18, 4.8% from 18 to 24, 30.5% from 25 to 44, 28.8% from 45 to 64, and 11.1% who were 65 years of age or older. The median age was 39.9 years. For every 100 females, the population had 88.7 males. For every 100 females ages 18 and older there were 83.1 males.

=== 2000 census ===
As of the 2000 United States census there were 4,755 people, 2,035 households, and 1,271 families living in the CDP. The population density was 698.1 people/km^{2} (1,808 people/mi^{2}). There were 2,059 housing units at an average density of 302.3 units/km^{2} (783 units/mi^{2}). The racial makeup of the CDP was 69.36% White, 10.96% African American, 0.06% Native American, 16.42% Asian, 1.07% from other races, and 2.12% from two or more races. Hispanic or Latino of any race were 4.35% of the population.

There were 2,035 households, out of which 31.4% had children under the age of 18 living with them, 50.7% were married couples living together, 9.7% had a female householder with no husband present, and 37.5% were non-families. 29.6% of all households were made up of individuals, and 3.7% had someone living alone who was 65 years of age or older. The average household size was 2.33 and the average family size was 2.94.

In the CDP the population was spread out, with 23.2% under the age of 18, 4.3% from 18 to 24, 40.1% from 25 to 44, 25.6% from 45 to 64, and 6.9% who were 65 years of age or older. The median age was 37 years. For every 100 females, there were 87.1 males. For every 100 females age 18 and over, there were 82.2 males.

The median income for a household in the CDP was $80,303, and the median income for a family was $92,020. Males had a median income of $71,014 versus $43,649 for females. The per capita income for the CDP was $40,641. About 1.4% of families and 2.4% of the population were below the poverty line, including 2.1% of those under age 18 and 1.2% of those age 65 or over.
