= Cottageville =

Cottageville may refer to:

- Cottageville, New Jersey
- Cottageville, South Carolina
- Cottageville, West Virginia
