= Cottageville, New Jersey =

Populated place in Middlesex County, New Jersey, US

- Unincorporated community
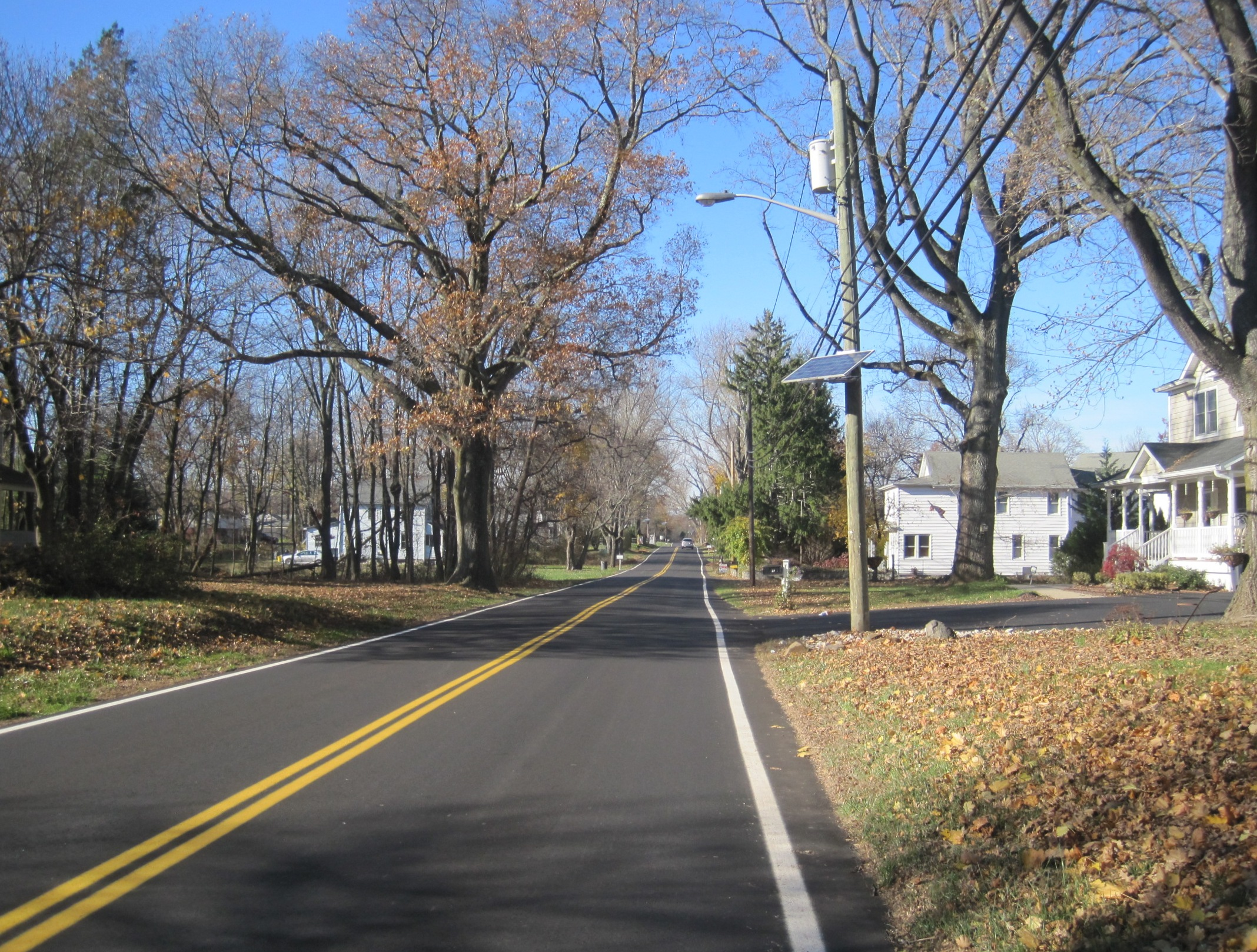
- Homes in Cottageville

- Location of Cottageville in Middlesex County Inset: Location of county within the state of New Jersey Cottageville (New Jersey) Cottageville (the United States)
- Coordinates: 40°24′37″N 74°29′04″W
- Country: United States
- State: New Jersey
- County: Middlesex
- Township: South Brunswick
- Elevation: 98 ft (30 m)
- GNIS feature ID: 883010

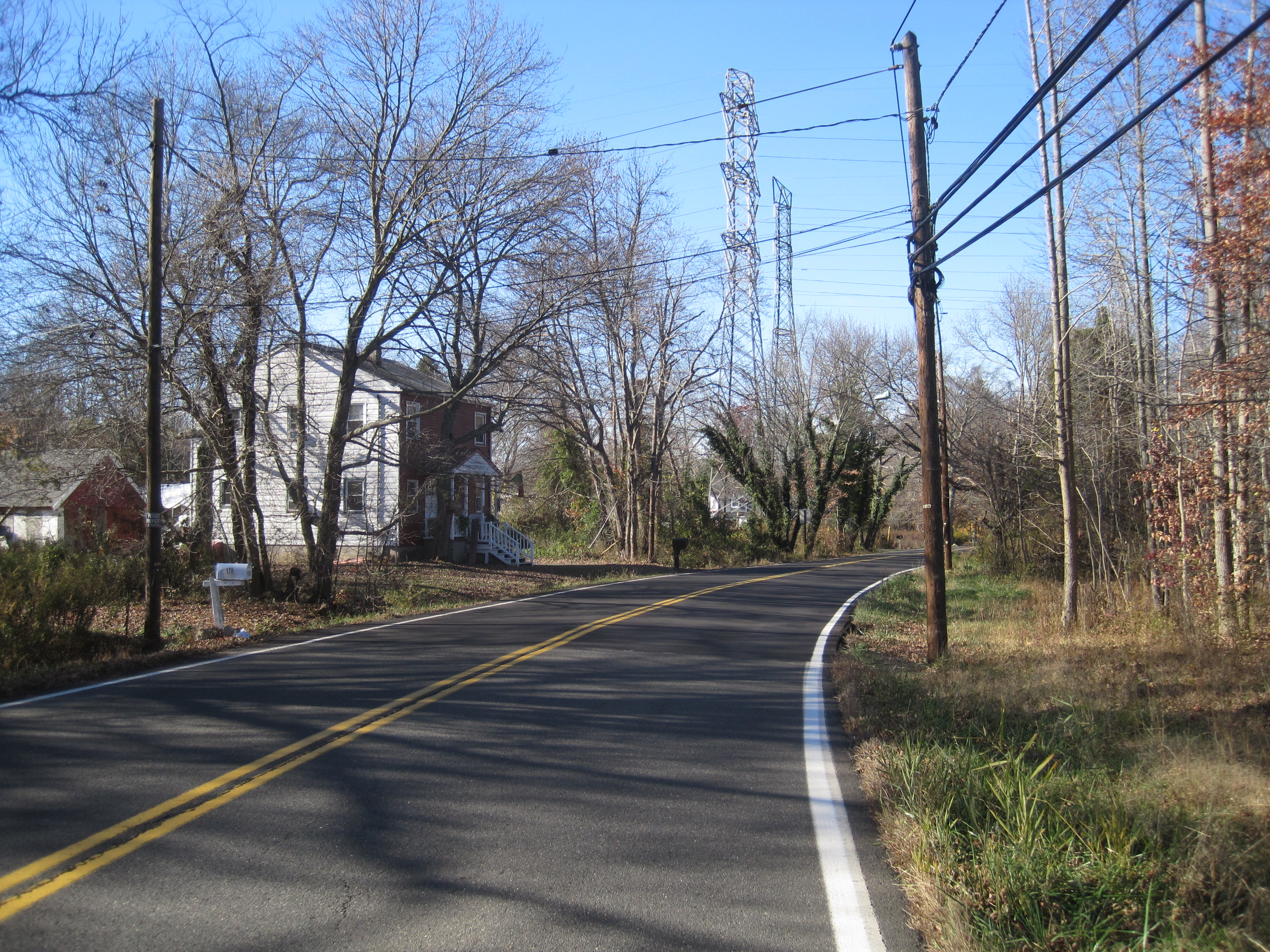
Site of the former Newark–Trenton Fast Line station, now occupied by transmission lines

Cottageville is an unincorporated community located within South Brunswick Township in Middlesex County, in the U.S. state of New Jersey. The settlement is located along Davidson Mill Road (formerly named Cottageville Road) at the former Newark–Trenton Fast Line right-of-way, now a PSE&G transmission line corridor. The trolley stop at the settlement allowed for summer cottages to be built in the area leading to the area's name. Today, some of the older homes remain in addition to a summer camp, forest land, and PSE&G's Deans substation.
