= Crosswicknung Trail =

The Crosswicknung Trail was a Native American trail that became an important road connecting New Brunswick, New Jersey and Cranbury, New Jersey. It would later be known as Georges Road.

== See also ==
- Assunpink Trail
- Deans, New Jersey
