= Deans, New Jersey =

Populated place in Middlesex County, New Jersey, US

- Census-designated place
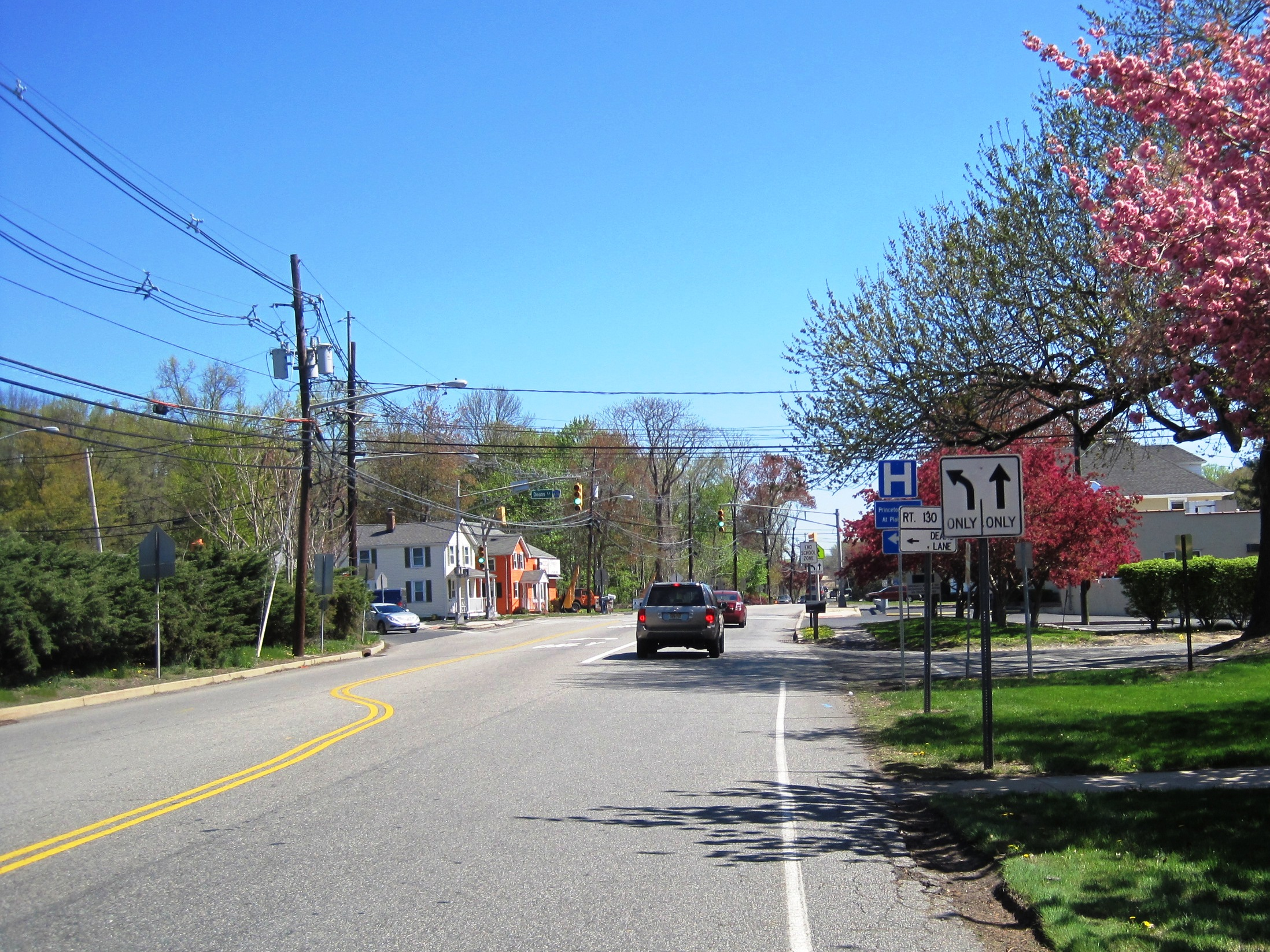
- Center of Deans at Georges Road and Deans Lane

- Location within Middlesex County, New Jersey Location within New Jersey Location within the United States
- Coordinates: 40°24′15″N 74°30′58″W
- Country: United States
- State: New Jersey
- County: Middlesex
- Township: South Brunswick

Area
  - Total: 1.13 sq mi (2.93 km^{2})
  - Land: 1.12 sq mi (2.90 km^{2})
  - Water: 0.012 sq mi (0.03 km^{2})
- Elevation: 85 ft (26 m)

Population (2020)
  - Total: 1,615
  - Density: 1,441.0/sq mi (556.36/km^{2})
- ZIP Code: 08852 (Monmouth Junction)
- FIPS code: 34-16720
- GNIS feature ID: 875833

Deans is an unincorporated community and census-designated place (CDP) in South Brunswick Township, Middlesex County, New Jersey, in the United States. As of the 2020 United States census, Deans had a population of 1,615.

== History ==
Deans originated from its location on both Crosswicknung Trail (Georges Road) and Lawrence Brook. Dams were built on the brook, creating Deans Pond.

== Geography ==
The community is situated around the intersection of Deans Lane (County Route 610) and Georges Road (CR 697). CR 610 continues east from the community on Deans Rhode Hall Road; other transportation facilities that pass near Deans include U.S. Route 130 just east of the community and the Northeast Corridor railroad to the west (a station serving the community once existed). Residential homes dot the area around Deans, but some businesses line nearby arterial roads, and large warehouses are situated along Industrial Way at US 130. New Brunswick, the Middlesex county seat, is 7 miles (11 km) to the northeast, while Trenton, the state capital, is 20 miles (32 km) to the southwest.

According to the U.S. Census Bureau, the Deans CDP has a total area of 1.13 square miles (2.93 km^{2}), of which 0.01 square miles (0.03 km^{2}), or 1.06%, are water. The community is drained by Lawrence Brook, a northeast-flowing tributary of the Raritan River.

== Demographics ==
Historical population
Census	Pop.	Note	%±
2020	1,615		—
U.S. Decennial Census; 2020

Deans first appeared as a census designated place in the 2020 U.S. census.

Deans CDP, New Jersey – Racial and ethnic composition Note: the US Census treats Hispanic/Latino as an ethnic category. This table excludes Latinos from the racial categories and assigns them to a separate category. Hispanics/Latinos may be of any race.
Race / Ethnicity (NH = Non-Hispanic)	Pop 2020	2020
White alone (NH)	371	22.97%
Black or African American alone (NH)	47	2.91%
Native American or Alaska Native alone (NH)	0	0.00%
Asian alone (NH)	1,060	65.63%
Native Hawaiian or Pacific Islander alone (NH)	0	0.00%
Other race alone (NH)	6	0.37%
Mixed race or Multiracial (NH)	30	1.86%
Hispanic or Latino (any race)	101	6.25%
Total	1,615	100.00%
