= Sand Hills, South Brunswick, New Jersey =

Populated place in Middlesex County, New Jersey, US

Sand Hills, New Jersey
- Unincorporated community
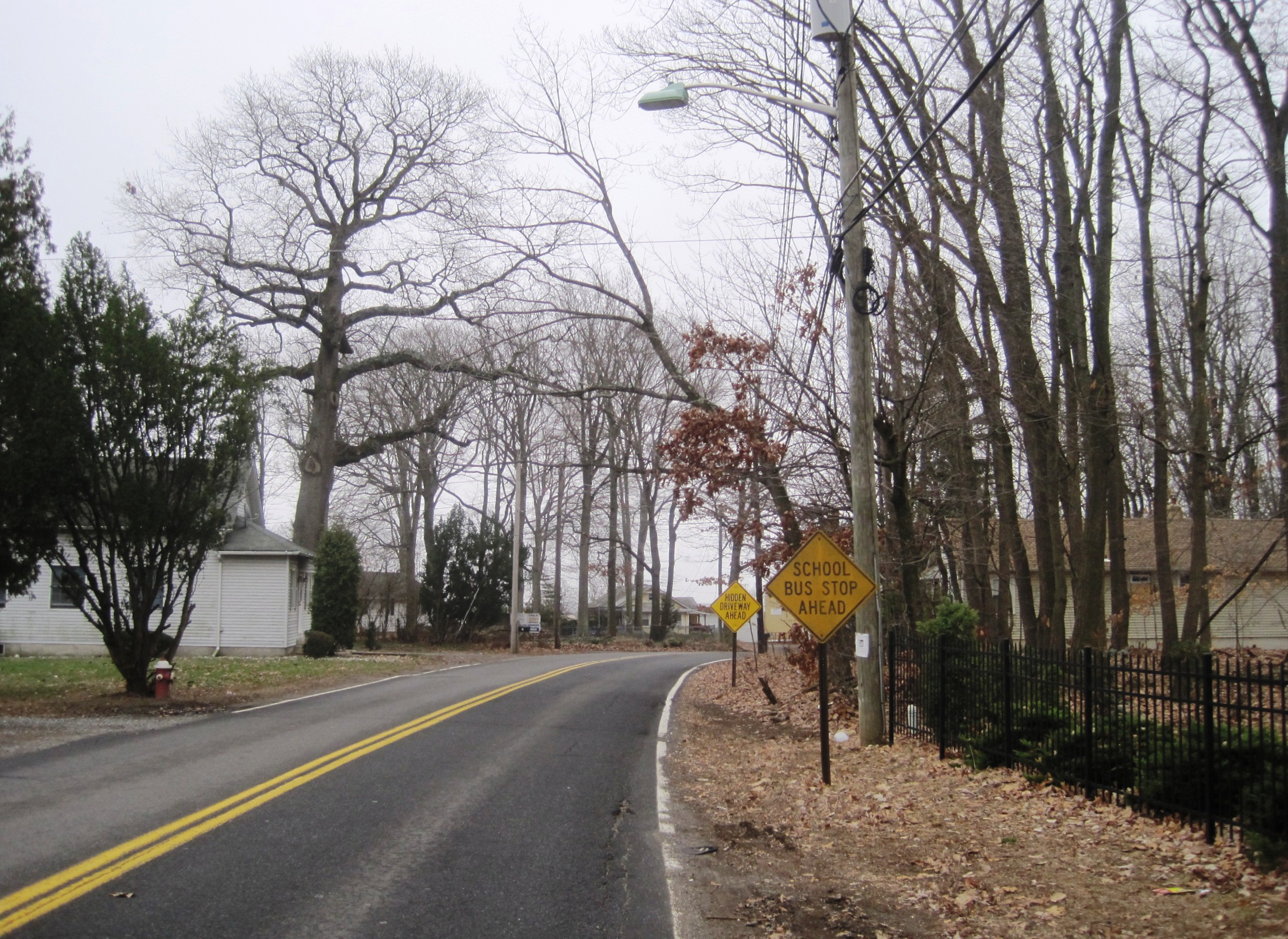
- Cluster of houses in Sand Hills along Major Road

- Location of Sand Hills in Middlesex County Inset: Location of county within the state of New Jersey Sand Hills (New Jersey) Sand Hills (the United States)
- Coordinates: 40°24′22″N 74°32′49″W
- Country: United States
- State: New Jersey
- County: Middlesex
- Township: South Brunswick
- Elevation: 253 ft (77 m)
- GNIS feature ID: 880247

Sand Hills is an unincorporated community located within South Brunswick Township in Middlesex County, in the U.S. state of New Jersey. The settlement is named for Sand Hills, a small group of diabase hills which contains Middlesex County's highest point. The settlement is located approximately at the intersection of U.S. Route 1 (US 1), Sand Hills Road, and Major Road. There is a small cluster of houses and small businesses on Major Road just south of US 1 while more housing developments are found on the north side of the highway. Fast food restaurants, stores, and repair shops line US 1 through the area; this area of US 1 also has large inclines on both sides of the hills to climb from the relatively low and flat areas of the Atlantic coastal plain.
