= South Brunswick, New Jersey =

Township in Middlesex County, New Jersey, US

- Township
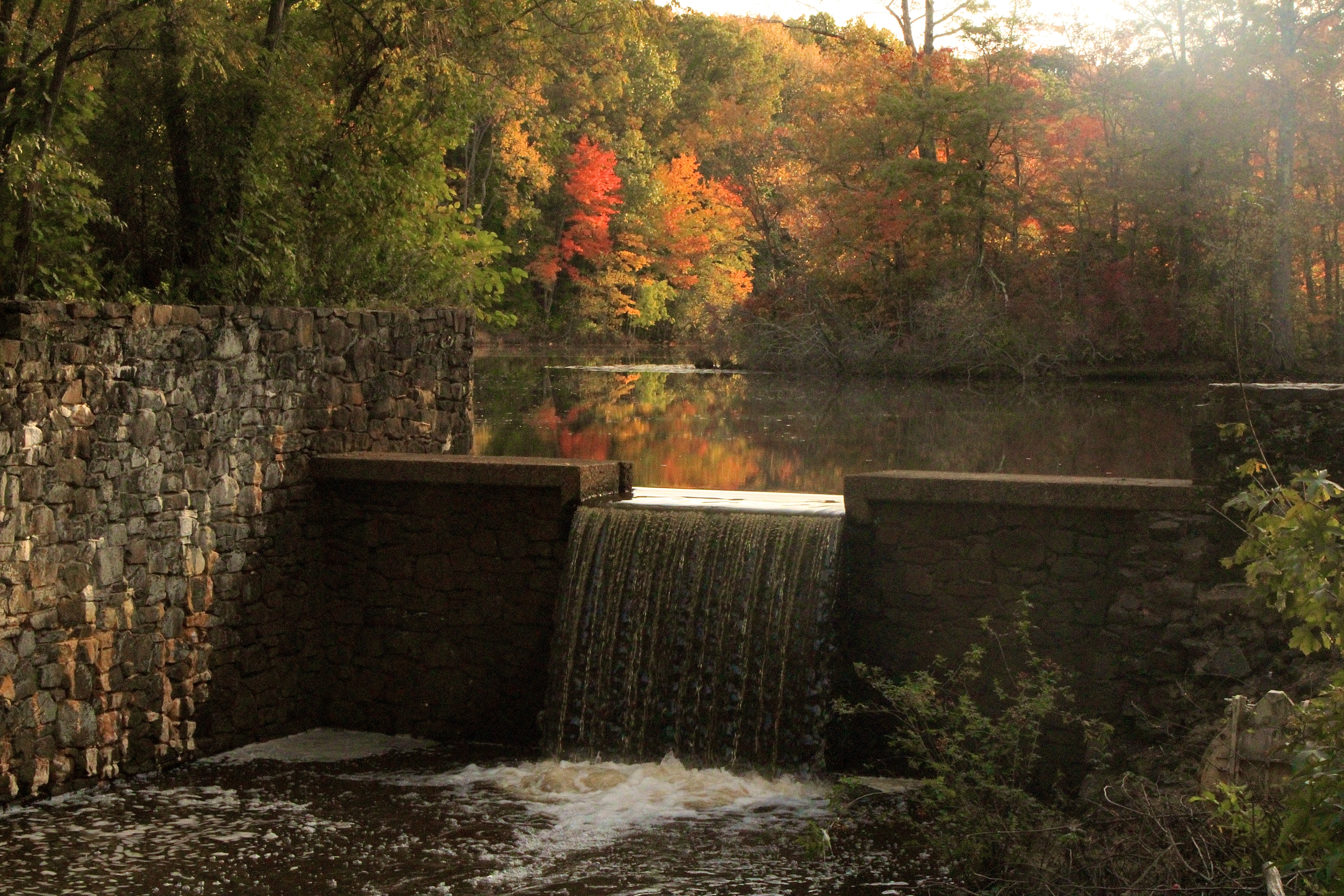
- Davidson's Mill Pond on the Lawrence Brook, site of the former grist mill

- Seal

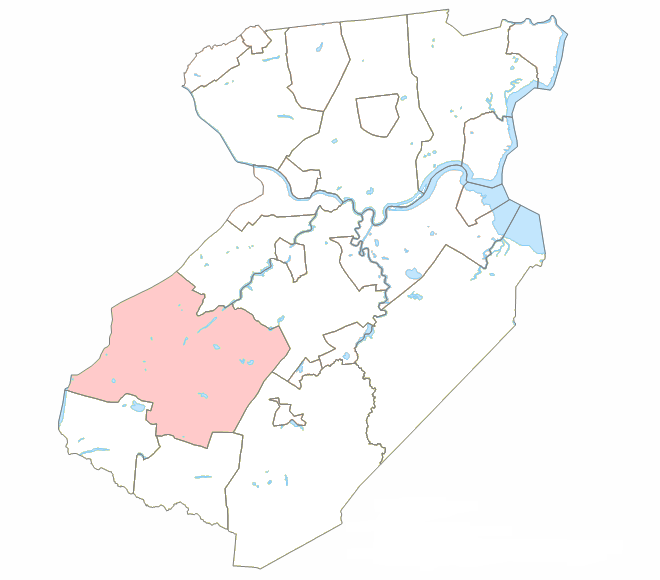
- Location of South Brunswick within Middlesex County, highlighted in pink

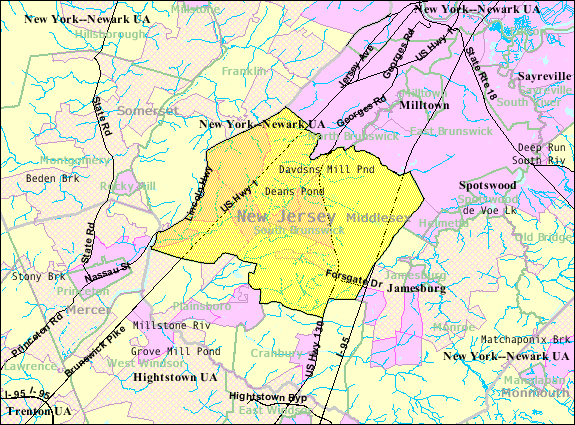
- Census Bureau map of South Brunswick, New Jersey

- Location in Middlesex County Location in New Jersey Location in the United States
- Coordinates: 40.384695°N 74.522762°W
- Country: United States
- State: New Jersey
- County: Middlesex
- Earliest mention: February 28, 1778
- Incorporated: February 21, 1798

Government
  - Type: Faulkner Act (council–manager)
  - Body: Township Council
  - Mayor: Charlie Carley (D, term ends December 31, 2026)
  - Manager: Bryan B. Bidlack
  - Municipal clerk: Barbara Nyitrai

Area
  - Total: 41.02 sq mi (106.23 km^{2})
  - Land: 40.61 sq mi (105.19 km^{2})
  - Water: 0.40 sq mi (1.04 km^{2}) 0.98%
  - Rank: 51st of 565 in state 2nd of 25 in county
- Elevation: 82 ft (25 m)

Population (2020)
  - Total: 47,043
  - Estimate (2023): 46,565
  - Rank: 43rd of 565 in state 9th of 25 in county
  - Density: 1,158.3/sq mi (447.2/km^{2})
  - Rank: 366th of 565 in state 24th of 25 in county
- Time zone: UTC−05:00 (Eastern (EST))
  - Summer (DST): UTC−04:00 (Eastern (EDT))
- ZIP Codes: 08810 – Dayton; 08824 – Kendall Park; 08852 – Monmouth Junction; 08528 – Kingston 08540 - Princeton; 08512 - Cranbury
- Area codes: 609 and 732
- FIPS code: 3402368790
- GNIS feature ID: 0882162
- Website: www.southbrunswicknj.gov

South Brunswick is a township in Middlesex County, in the U.S. state of New Jersey. The township is centrally located within the Raritan Valley region and is an outer-ring suburb of New York City in the New York metropolitan area. As of the 2020 United States census, the township's population was 47,043, its highest ever decennial census count and an increase of 3,626 (+8.4%) from the 2010 census count of 43,417, which in turn reflected an increase of 5,683 (+15.1%) from the 37,734 counted in the 2000 census.

South Brunswick was first mentioned in minutes of the Board of Chosen Freeholders on February 28, 1778, as being formed from the township of New Brunswick. It was formally incorporated as one of New Jersey's initial group of 104 townships on February 21, 1798. Portions of the township have been taken to form Cranbury (as of March 7, 1872) and Plainsboro Township (on April 1, 1919).

Niche.com placed Monmouth Junction in the top 10 of its "2021 Best Places to Live in New Jersey". In 2021, SafeWise placed South Brunswick in the "100 Safest Cities in America".

== History ==
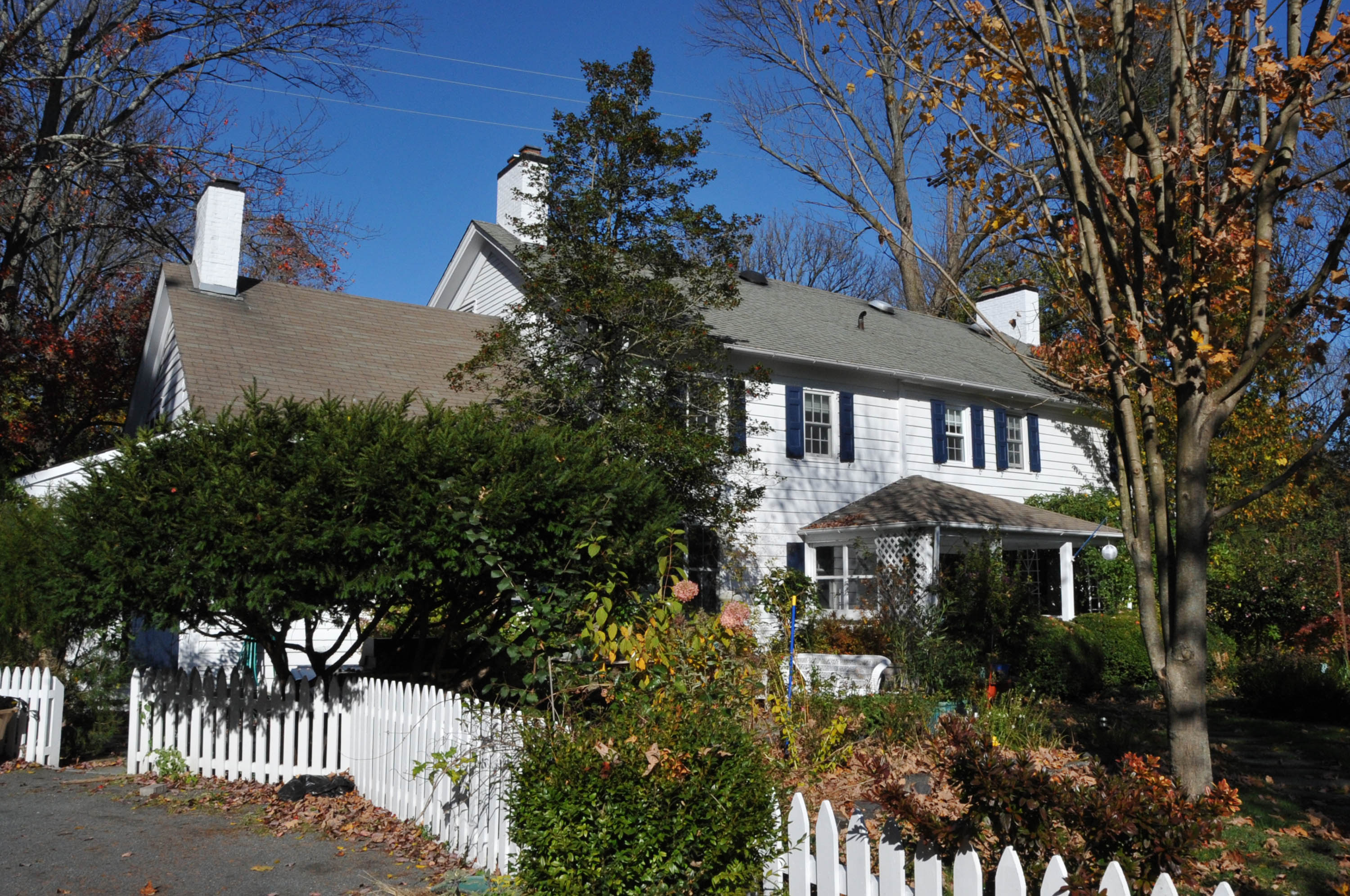
Red Maple Farm

South Brunswick Township was incorporated by the New Jersey Legislature Act on February 21, 1798. The community was primarily agricultural in the 18th and 19th centuries. The Straight Turnpike, now Route 1, was constructed in 1804. The township got its name from New Brunswick, which in turn was named after the city of Braunschweig (called Brunswick in the Low German language), in the state of Lower Saxony, in Germany. Braunschweig was an influential and powerful city in the Hanseatic League, later in the Holy Roman Empire, and was an administrative seat for the Duchy (and later Principality) of Hanover. Shortly after the first settlement of New Brunswick in colonial New Jersey, George, Duke of Brunswick-Lüneburg, and Elector of Hanover, of the House of Hanover (also known as the House of Brunswick), became King George I of Great Britain (1660–1727). Alternatively, the city derived its name from King George II of Great Britain, the Duke of Brunswick-Lüneburg.

In 1872, the Legislature first reduced the size of South Brunswick by creating Cranbury from the southern portion of South Brunswick. In 1885, it redefined and enlarged the boundaries of Cranbury, and Plainsboro Township was formed in 1919. The present boundaries of South Brunswick date back to this last change.

During the 20th century, South Brunswick saw extensive transformation with the impact of changes in transportation technology. The New Brunswick and Trenton Fast Line began operation in 1900, a trolley line running parallel to the Old Straight Turnpike of 1804 (Route 1), intersecting George's Road just north of the Five Corners intersection in Dayton. This trolley provided daily passenger and freight service, stopping at a local crossroads. The New Jersey Turnpike opened in 1951, again roughly parallel to Route 1, on the eastern edge of the Township. One effect of the Turnpike opening up Interchange 8A (just outside the township) was transforming the agricultural area on the southeast corner of South Brunswick into a burgeoning industrial development. Significant portions of land between Route 130 and the turnpike consist primarily of warehouses.

In 1980, the township's population approached 18,000. In 1990, this figure reached 25,792; by 2020, South Brunswick had over 47,000 residents. Much of the township's 42 square miles (110 km^{2}) remain undeveloped and there are still significant amounts of wetlands, woodlands, and open space within the community.

== Geography ==
According to the United States Census Bureau, the township had a total area of 41.02 square miles (106.23 km^{2}), including 40.61 square miles (105.19 km^{2}) of land and 0.40 square miles (1.04 km^{2}) of water (0.98%).

Dayton (2020 Census population of 8,138), Deans (1,615), Heathcote (7,154), Kendall Park (9,989), Kingston (1,581) and Monmouth Junction (8,895) are unincorporated communities and census-designated places (CDPs) located within South Brunswick.

Other unincorporated communities, localities and place names located partially or completely within the township include: Cottageville,, Franklin Park, Fresh Ponds, Little Rocky Hill, Sand Hills, South Brunswick Terrace and Ten Mile Run.

Because the township is served by several different zip codes, Dayton, Monmouth Junction, Kendall Park, Kingston, Jamesburg, Cranbury, Princeton and even North Brunswick are often used in place of the township's name, even when referring to areas located beyond their defined boundaries.

Dayton was first known simply as The Cross Roads, where James Whitlock built a tavern on Georges Road around 1750. Early enterprises included a brick manufacturer and a large nursery. In 1866, the name was changed from Cross Roads to Dayton, in honor of William L. Dayton, an attorney for the Freehold and Jamesburg Agricultural Railroad. Dayton had helped settle disputes arising from the location of a railroad right-of-way. He was later a United States Senator, was the first Republican nominee for Vice President (in 1856), and Minister to France.

Deans originated from its location on both Crosswicknung Trail (Georges Road) and Lawrence Brook. Dams were built on the brook, creating Deans Pond.

With increased mobility and a growing population, the suburban-style residential development was born after World War II. Kendall Park, located off Route 27, the old Native American trail and major thoroughfare of earlier centuries, was begun in 1957.

Kingston's location on the Lenape Assunpink Trail where it crossed the Millstone River was the prime factor in its early prominence. Kingston was by far the most active and important community, being situated on both the heavily traveled King's Road and Millstone River, combining commercial activities of both mills and taverns. The Kingston Village Advisory Committee, jointly appointed by the South Brunswick and Franklin township councils, reports to the South Brunswick township council on matters of concern to residents of Kingston. Kingston has been designated as a Village Center by the New Jersey State Planning Commission and is overseen by an advisory commission that consists of seven members from Franklin Township and South Brunswick.

Monmouth Junction was created as the junction of three rail branches, the New York division of the Pennsylvania Railroad, the Rocky Hill and the Jamesburg and Freehold Railroad.

The Lawrence Brook, a tributary of the Raritan River, flows through the center of the township. The area also lies within the Manalapan Brook watershed in the eastern portion of the township and the Millstone River watershed in the western portion of the township, which are both also subwatersheds within the Raritan Basin.

Pigeon Swamp State Park is a New Jersey state park located on Deans Rhode Hall Road (Middlesex CR 610). The park has 1,078 acres (4.36 km^{2}) of undeveloped land.

The Pigeon Swamp Ledger is a 1780 document that is an accounting log of South Brunswick landowners regarding the draining of the Pigeon Swamp. This was made possible by a New Jersey Act of Legislature.

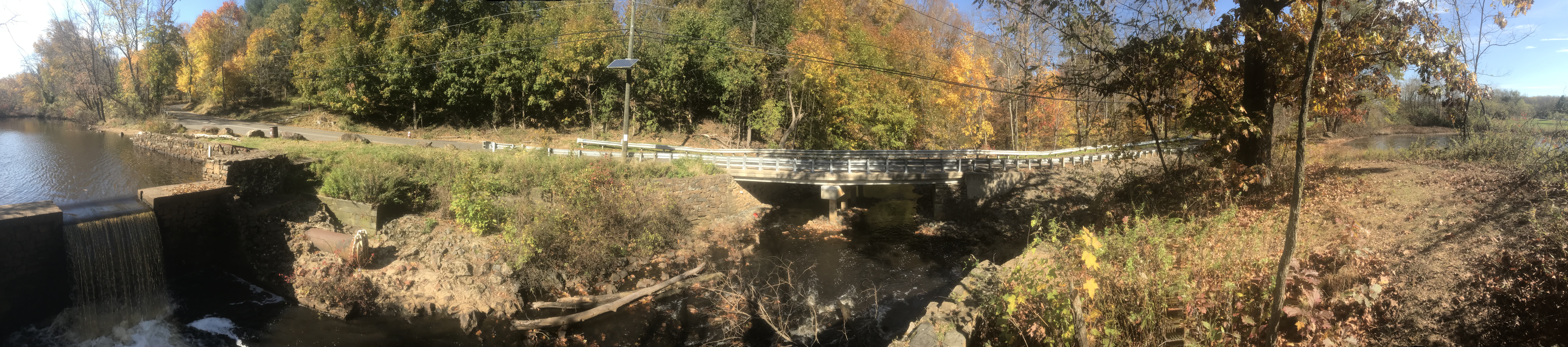
A panorama of Davidson's Mill Pond in the central portion of the township

The township borders Cranbury, East Brunswick, Monroe Township, North Brunswick and Plainsboro Township in Middlesex County; Princeton in Mercer County; and Franklin Township in Somerset County.

=== Climate ===
South Brunswick is in the humid continental climate zone. Average wintertime high temperatures range from 38 to 43 °F (3 to 6 °C), and the lows range from 19 to 24 °F (−7 to −4 °C) degrees with the record low being −16 °F (−27 °C). Average summertime high temperatures range from 84 to 87 °F (29 to 31 °C), though temperatures exceed 90 °F (32 °C) often with the record high being 105 °F (41 °C). The summertime lows range from 63 to 67 °F (17 to 19 °C) degrees. South Brunswick can receive much snow during the winter months, sometimes up to 3 feet (0.91 m). About 4 to 5 inches (10 to 13 cm) of rain falls every month and is evenly spread throughout the year, though the area can go through long periods of drought or long-lasting periods with little to no rain. During winter and early spring, South Brunswick can in some years experience "nor'easters", which are capable of causing blizzards or flooding throughout the northeastern United States. Hurricanes and tropical storms (such as Hurricane Irene in 2011), tornadoes, and earthquakes are rare.

Climate data for South Brunswick (Dayton), New Jersey
Month	Jan	Feb	Mar	Apr	May	Jun	Jul	Aug	Sep	Oct	Nov	Dec	Year
Mean daily maximum °F (°C)	39 (4)	42 (6)	51 (11)	62 (17)	72 (22)	81 (27)	86 (30)	84 (29)	78 (26)	66 (19)	55 (13)	44 (7)	63 (18)
Mean daily minimum °F (°C)	22 (−6)	23 (−5)	31 (−1)	40 (4)	50 (10)	59 (15)	64 (18)	62 (17)	55 (13)	43 (6)	35 (2)	27 (−3)	43 (6)
Average precipitation inches (mm)	4.10 (104)	2.98 (76)	4.11 (104)	4.08 (104)	4.57 (116)	3.86 (98)	4.97 (126)	4.46 (113)	4.38 (111)	3.39 (86)	3.95 (100)	3.93 (100)	48.78 (1,239)
Source: https://www.ncei.noaa.gov/access/us-climate-normals/#dataset=normals-monthly&timeframe=15&location=NJ

== Demographics ==
Historical population
Census	Pop.	Note	%±
1790	1,817		—
1810	2,332		—
1820	2,489		6.7%
1830	2,557		2.7%
1840	2,797		9.4%
1850	3,368		20.4%
1860	3,816		13.3%
1870	3,779		−1.0%
1880	2,803	*	−25.8%
1890	2,403		−14.3%
1900	2,337		−2.7%
1910	2,443		4.5%
1920	2,206	*	−9.7%
1930	2,758		25.0%
1940	3,129		13.5%
1950	4,001		27.9%
1960	10,278		156.9%
1970	14,058		36.8%
1980	17,127		21.8%
1990	25,792		50.6%
2000	37,734		46.3%
2010	43,417		15.1%
2020	47,043		8.4%
2023 (est.)	46,565		−1.0%
Population sources: 1790–1920 1840; 1850–1870 1850; 1870 1880–1890; 1890–1910 1910–1930; 1940–2000 2000; 2010 2020 * = Lost territory in previous decade.

=== 2020 census ===
The 2020 United States census counted 47,043 people in the township, which was a gain of 8.4% from the 2010 census. The racial makeup was 48.1% Asian, 35.5% white, 7.6% Black, 7.5% Hispanic or Latino, and 5.5% reported two or more races. There were 16,647 households in the township.

=== 2010 census ===
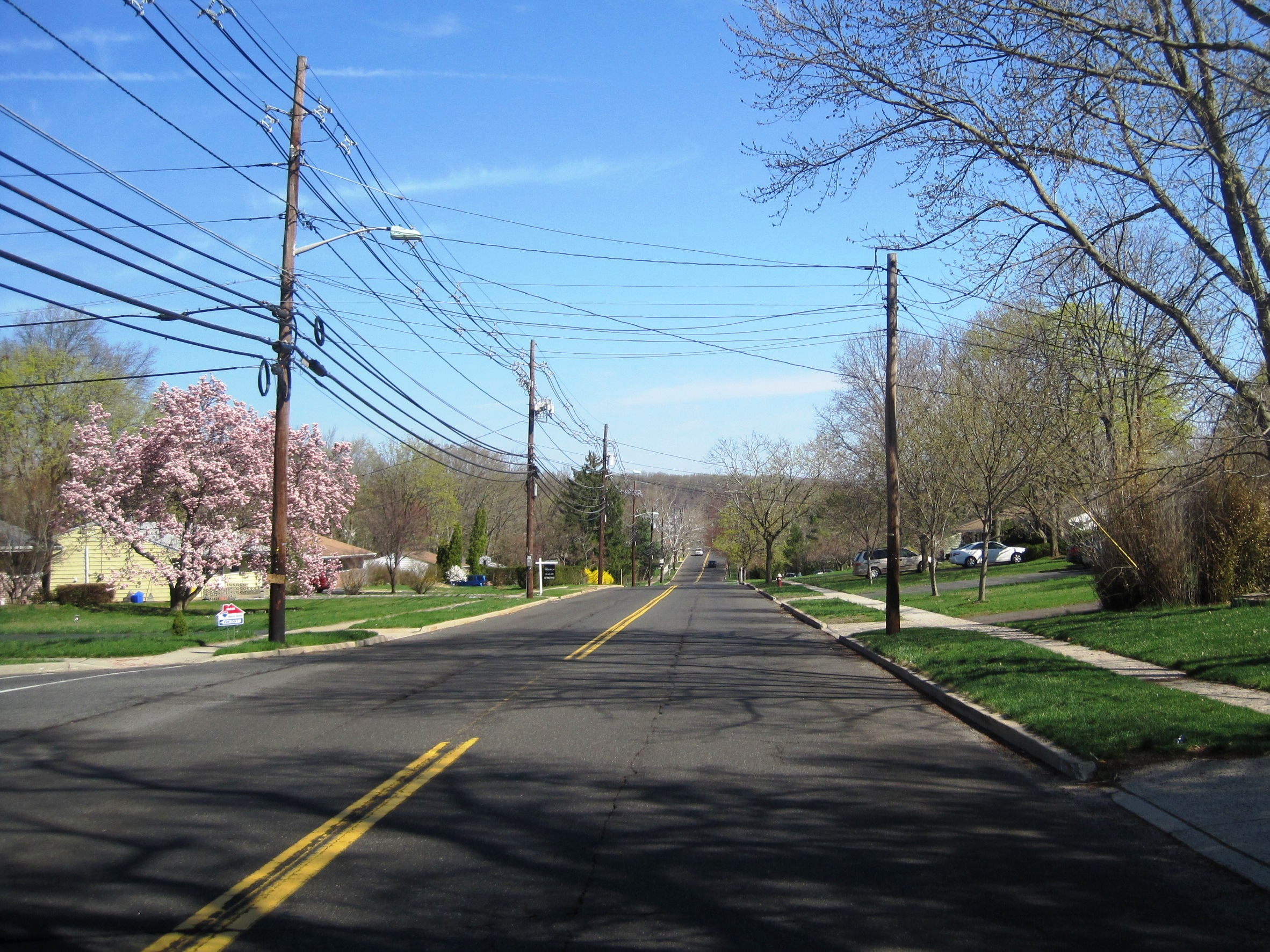
Suburban street in the neighborhood of Kendall Park

The 2010 United States census counted 43,417 people, 15,069 households, and 11,694 families in the township. The population density was 1,068.1 per square mile (412.4/km^{2}). There were 15,708 housing units at an average density of 386.4 per square mile (149.2/km^{2}). The racial makeup was 52.08% (22,611) White, 7.71% (3,348) Black or African American, 0.17% (72) Native American, 35.91% (15,592) Asian, 0.02% (8) Pacific Islander, 1.52% (658) from other races, and 2.60% (1,128) from two or more races. Hispanic or Latino of any race were 6.04% (2,624) of the population.

Of the 15,069 households, 44.3% had children under the age of 18; 66.1% were married couples living together; 8.8% had a female householder with no husband present and 22.4% were non-families. Of all households, 18.8% were made up of individuals and 6.0% had someone living alone who was 65 years of age or older. The average household size was 2.88 and the average family size was 3.33.

27.7% of the population were under the age of 18, 6.4% from 18 to 24, 27.7% from 25 to 44, 28.8% from 45 to 64, and 9.4% who were 65 years of age or older. The median age was 38.6 years. For every 100 females, the population had 93.9 males. For every 100 females ages 18 and older there were 90.4 males.

The Census Bureau's 2006–2010 American Community Survey showed that (in 2010 inflation-adjusted dollars) median household income was $100,950 (with a margin of error of +/− $2,777) and the median family income was $116,127 (+/− $5,529). Males had a median income of $81,297 (+/− $2,632) versus $55,477 (+/− $3,835) for females. The per capita income for the borough was $40,468 (+/− $1,430). About 2.1% of families and 3.1% of the population were below the poverty line, including 3.4% of those under age 18 and 5.6% of those age 65 or over.

=== 2000 census ===
As of the 2000 United States census there were 37,734 people, 13,428 households, and 10,084 families residing in the township. The population density was 923.5 inhabitants per square mile (356.6/km^{2}). There were 13,862 housing units at an average density of 339.3 per square mile (131.0/km^{2}). The racial makeup of the township was 70.49% White, 7.88% African American, 0.13% Native American, 18.04% Asian, 0.04% Pacific Islander, 1.37% from other races, and 2.04% from two or more races. Hispanic or Latino of any race were 5.08% of the population.

As of the 2000 census, 10.48% of South Brunswick's residents identified themselves as being of Indian American ancestry, which was the seventh-highest of any municipality in the United States and the fourth highest in New Jersey – behind Edison (17.75%), Plainsboro Township (16.97%) and Piscataway (12.49%) – of all places with 1,000 or more residents identifying their ancestry.

There were 13,428 households, out of which 43.0% had children under the age of 18 living with them, 63.8% were married couples living together, 8.6% had a female householder with no husband present, and 24.9% were non-families. 19.6% of all households were made up of individuals, and 4.3% had someone living alone who was 65 years of age or older. The average household size was 2.80 and the average family size was 3.27.

In the township, the population was spread out, with 28.4% under the age of 18, 5.7% from 18 to 24, 36.7% from 25 to 44, 21.8% from 45 to 64, and 7.3% who were 65 years of age or older. The median age was 35 years. For every 100 females, there were 94.0 males. For every 100 females age 18 and over, there were 91.3 males.

The median income for a household in the township was $78,737, and the median income for a family was $86,891. Males had a median income of $61,637 versus $41,554 for females. The per capita income for the township was $32,104. About 2.1% of families and 3.1% of the population were below the poverty line, including 2.9% of those under age 18 and 4.5% of those age 65 or over.

== Economy ==
=== Top employers ===
Major employers in the township include:

Employer	Community
Dow Jones & Company	Monmouth Junction
Maserbuild Industries LLC	Dayton
South Brunswick Public Schools	Monmouth Junction
International Flavors & Fragrances	Dayton
Liberty Coca-Cola	Monmouth Junction
High Grade Beverage	Deans
Freeze Division-Central Mills	Monmouth Junction
Tris Pharma Inc.	Monmouth Junction
Guardian Drug Co	Dayton
L'Oréal	Monmouth Junction
Canon Inc	Monmouth Junction
United Parcel Service	Monmouth Junction

== Government ==
=== Local government ===
South Brunswick operates within the Faulkner Act, formally known as the Optional Municipal Charter Law, under the Council-Manager form of municipal government. The township is one of 42 municipalities (of the 564) statewide that use this form of government. The governing body is comprised of the Mayor and the four-member Township Council. Members of the Township Council are elected at-large to four-year terms in partisan elections on a staggered basis with two seats up for election in even-numbered years. The mayoral seat is up for election directly by the voters. At a reorganization meeting held in January after each election, the council selects a deputy mayor from among its members.

As of 2025, members of the Township Council are Mayor Charles Carley (D, term as mayor ends December 31, 2026), Deputy mayor Kenneth Bierman (D, 2026), Patricia Germain (D, 2028), Archana "Ann" Grover (D, 2028) and Josephine Hochman (D, 2028).

=== Federal, state and county representation ===
South Brunswick is located in the 12th Congressional District and is part of New Jersey's 16th state legislative district.

For the 119th United States Congress, New Jersey's 12th congressional district is represented by Bonnie Watson Coleman (D, Ewing Township). New Jersey is represented in the United States Senate by Democrats Cory Booker (Newark, term ends 2027) and Andy Kim (Moorestown, term ends 2031).

For the 2026–2027 session, the 16th legislative district of the New Jersey Legislature is represented in the New Jersey Senate by Andrew Zwicker (D, South Brunswick) and in the General Assembly by Mitchelle Drulis (D, East Amwell Township) and Roy Freiman (D, Hillsborough Township).

Middlesex County is governed by a Board of County Commissioners, whose seven members are elected at-large on a partisan basis to serve three-year terms of office on a staggered basis, with either two or three seats coming up for election each year as part of the November general election. At an annual reorganization meeting held in January, the board selects from among its members a commissioner director and deputy director. As of 2025, Middlesex County's Commissioners (with party affiliation, term-end year, and residence listed in parentheses) are:

Director Ronald G. Rios (D, Carteret, 2027), Deputy Director Shanti Narra (D, North Brunswick, 2027), Claribel A. "Clary" Azcona-Barber (D, New Brunswick, 2025), Charles Kenny (D, Woodbridge Township, 2025), Leslie Koppel (D, Monroe Township, 2026), Chanelle Scott McCullum (D, Piscataway, 2025) and Charles E. Tomaro (D, Edison, 2026).

Constitutional officers are: Clerk Nancy Pinkin (D, 2025, East Brunswick), Sheriff Mildred S. Scott (D, 2025, Piscataway) and Surrogate Claribel Cortes (D, 2026; North Brunswick).

=== Politics ===
As of November 2, 2021, there were a total of 34,403 registered voters in South Brunswick.

United States presidential election results for South Brunswick
Year	Republican		Democratic		Third party(ies)	
Year	No.	%	No.	%	No.	%
2024	7,962	35.42%	13,338	59.34%	1,177	5.24%
2020	7,163	30.10%	16,351	68.72%	281	1.18%
2016	6,197	31.53%	12,827	65.25%	633	3.22%
2012	6,233	34.61%	11,583	64.31%	194	1.08%
2008	6,530	35.96%	11,452	63.07%	176	0.97%
2004	6,925	42.23%	9,346	56.99%	128	0.78%
2000	5,430	39.38%	7,804	56.60%	553	4.01%

In the United States Presidential Election of 2020, Democrat Joseph Biden received 68.7% of the votes (16,351 cast), ahead of Republican candidate Donald J. Trump who received 30.1% of the votes (7,163 cast), and other candidates Jo Jorgensen with 139 votes and Howie Hawkins with 88 votes, among the 24,176 total ballots cast with 32,470 registered voters. In the United States Presidential Election of 2016, Democrat Hillary Clinton received 65.3% votes (12,827 cast), ahead of Republican candidate Donald J. Trump who received 31.5% votes (6,197 cast), and other candidates Gary Johnson with 372 votes and Jill Stein with 197 votes, among the 20,021 total ballots cast with 29,447 registered voters. In the 2012 presidential election, Democrat Barack Obama received 64.3% of the vote (11,583 cast), ahead of Republican Mitt Romney with 34.6% (6,233 votes), and other candidates with 1.1% (194 votes), among the 18,141 ballots cast by the township's 25,947 registered voters (131 ballots were spoiled), for a turnout of 69.9%. In the 2008 presidential election, Democrat Barack Obama received 62.7% of the vote (11,452 cast), ahead of Republican John McCain with 35.7% (6,530 votes) and other candidates with 1.0% (176 votes), among the 18,275 ballots cast by the township's 24,803 registered voters, for a turnout of 73.7%.

Gubernatorial election results for South Brunswick
Year	Republican		Democratic		Third party(ies)	
Year	No.	%	No.	%	No.	%
2025	4,896	28.23%	12,317	71.02%	130	0.75%
2021	4,526	34.32%	8,541	64.76%	122	0.93%
2017	3,757	34.37%	6,957	63.64%	218	1.99%
2013	5,608	59.09%	3,755	39.56%	128	1.35%
2009	5,355	47.84%	4,991	44.59%	848	7.58%
2005	4,466	42.90%	5,516	52.98%	429	4.12%

In the 2021 gubernatorial election, Democrat Philip Murphy received 64.8% of the vote (8,541 votes), ahead of Republican Jack Ciattarelli with 34.3% (4,526 votes), and other candidates with 0.9% (122 votes), among the 13,332 votes cast by the township's 34,403 registered voters. In the 2017 gubernatorial election, Philip Murphy received 63.6%% of the vote (6,957 votes), ahead of Republican Kim Guadagno with 34.4% (3,757 votes), and other candidates with 2.0% (218 votes), among the 11,073 votes cast by the township's 28,647 registered voters. In the 2013 gubernatorial election, Republican Chris Christie received 59.1% of the vote (5,608 cast), ahead of Democrat Barbara Buono with 39.6% (3,755 votes), and other candidates with 1.3% (128 votes), among the 9,576 ballots cast by the township's 26,340 registered voters (85 ballots were spoiled), for a turnout of 36.4%. In the 2009 gubernatorial election, Republican Chris Christie received 47.3% of the vote (5,355 ballots cast), ahead of Democrat Jon Corzine with 44.1% (4,991 votes), Independent Chris Daggett with 6.7% (758 votes) and other candidates with 0.8% (90 votes), among the 11,311 ballots cast by the township's 23,974 registered voters, yielding a 47.2% turnout.

United States Senate election results for South Brunswick1
Year	Republican		Democratic		Third party(ies)	
Year	No.	%	No.	%	No.	%
2024	7,149	33.18%	13,244	61.46%	1,155	5.36%
2018	5,220	33.07%	10,074	63.81%	493	3.12%
2012	5,906	34.76%	10,795	63.53%	292	1.72%
2006	3,836	39.94%	5,485	57.11%	283	2.95%

United States Senate election results for South Brunswick2
Year	Republican		Democratic		Third party(ies)	
Year	No.	%	No.	%	No.	%
2020	7,159	30.64%	15,714	67.25%	494	2.11%
2014	3,131	36.83%	5,228	61.49%	143	1.68%
2013	2,197	37.21%	3,659	61.97%	48	0.81%
2008	6,673	39.29%	10,020	59.00%	290	1.71%

== Education ==
The South Brunswick Public Schools serves students in pre-kindergarten through twelfth grade. As of the 2023–24 school year, the district, comprised of 12 schools, had an enrollment of 7,936 students and 665.4 classroom teachers (on an FTE basis), for a student–teacher ratio of 11.9:1. Schools in the district (with 2023–24 enrollment data from the National Center for Education Statistics) are Dayton Preschool with 94 students in PreK, Deans Preschool with 108 students in PreK, Brooks Crossing Elementary School with 540 students in grades K–5, Brunswick Acres Elementary School with 444 students in grades PreK–5, Cambridge Elementary School with 427 students in grades K–5, Constable Elementary School with 504 students in grades PreK–5, Greenbrook Elementary School with 395 students in grades PreK–5, Indian Fields Elementary School with 473 students in grades K–5, Monmouth Junction Elementary School with 281 students in grades PreK–5, Crossroads Middle School North with 961 students in grades 6–8, Crossroads Middle School South with 923 students in grades 6–8 and South Brunswick High School with 2,728 students in grades 9–12.

The district has grown substantially, with district enrollment more than doubling in a two-decade period, from 4,000 in 1991 to more than 9,000 in 2011 and high school enrollment doubling to nearly 2,000 in the decade prior to 2001 and increasing by another 1,000 in the subsequent decade. Enrollment subsequently declined, from 8,620 students in the 2018-19 school year to less than 8,000 in 2023–24.

Eighth grade students from all of Middlesex County are eligible to apply to attend the high school programs offered by the Middlesex County Magnet Schools, a county-wide vocational school district that offers full-time career and technical education at its schools in East Brunswick, Edison, Perth Amboy, Piscataway and Woodbridge Township, with no tuition charged to students for attendance.

St. Augustine of Canterbury School is Pre-K–8 elementary school in Kendall Park operating under the auspices of the Roman Catholic Diocese of Metuchen. In 2016, the school was one of ten schools in New Jersey, and one of the private schools, recognized as a National Blue Ribbon School by the United States Department of Education, a recognition celebrating excellence in academics.

== Religion ==
South Brunswick has many different religions and is a diverse community. ISCJ, the Islamic Society of Central Jersey, serves the Muslim community. Chabad of South Brunswick, established in 1974, Chabad of South Brunswick, affiliated with the Chabad House at Rutgers University, has served the local Jewish community since 1978. There is also the Princeton Japanese Church (プリンストン日本語教会, Purinsuton Nihongo Kyōkai), catering to the area Japanese community, in Monmouth Junction, South Brunswick. It was established in October 1991, and in 1993 had 20–25 attendees per Sunday church worship.Shree Swaminarayan Hindu Temple in Monmouth Junction serves South Brunswick's Hindu community.

== Historic district ==
The Kingston Mill Historic District is a 49-acre (20 ha) historic district encompassing the community of Kingston, New Jersey (which is bounded by South Brunswick in Middlesex County, Princeton in Mercer County, and Franklin Township in Somerset County). In 1683, Henry Greenland built the first tavern here for travelers between New York City and Philadelphia. The current Kingston Mill, also known as the Kingston Gristmill, was built in 1888, the third one at this site. In 1755, Jacob Skilman built a gristmill and sawmill here on the Millstone River, located along the historic King's Highway. It was added to the National Register of Historic Places on April 10, 1986 for its significance in engineering, exploration/settlement, industry, and transportation. The district includes 16 contributing buildings and 2 contributing structures.

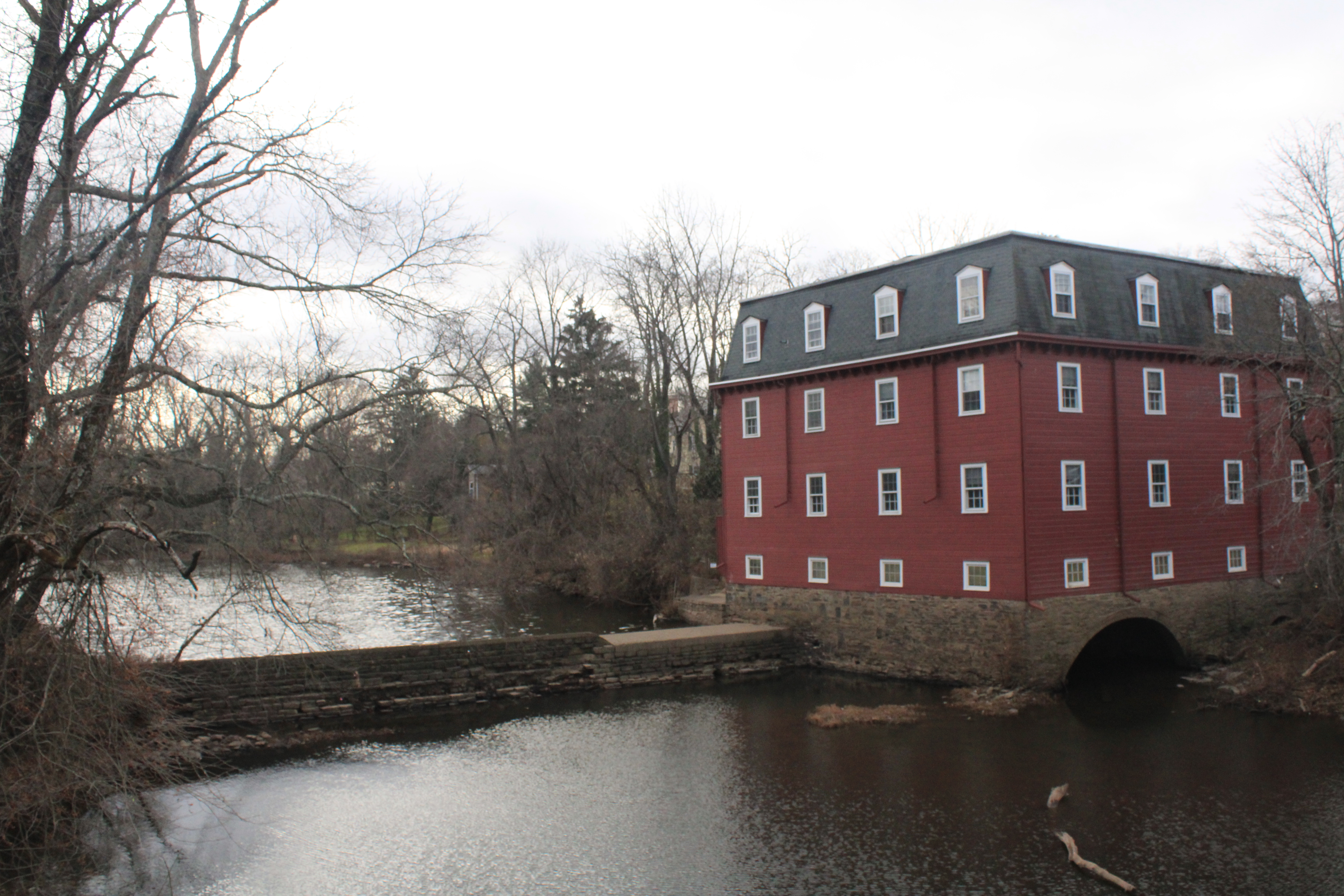
Kingston Mill on the Millstone River

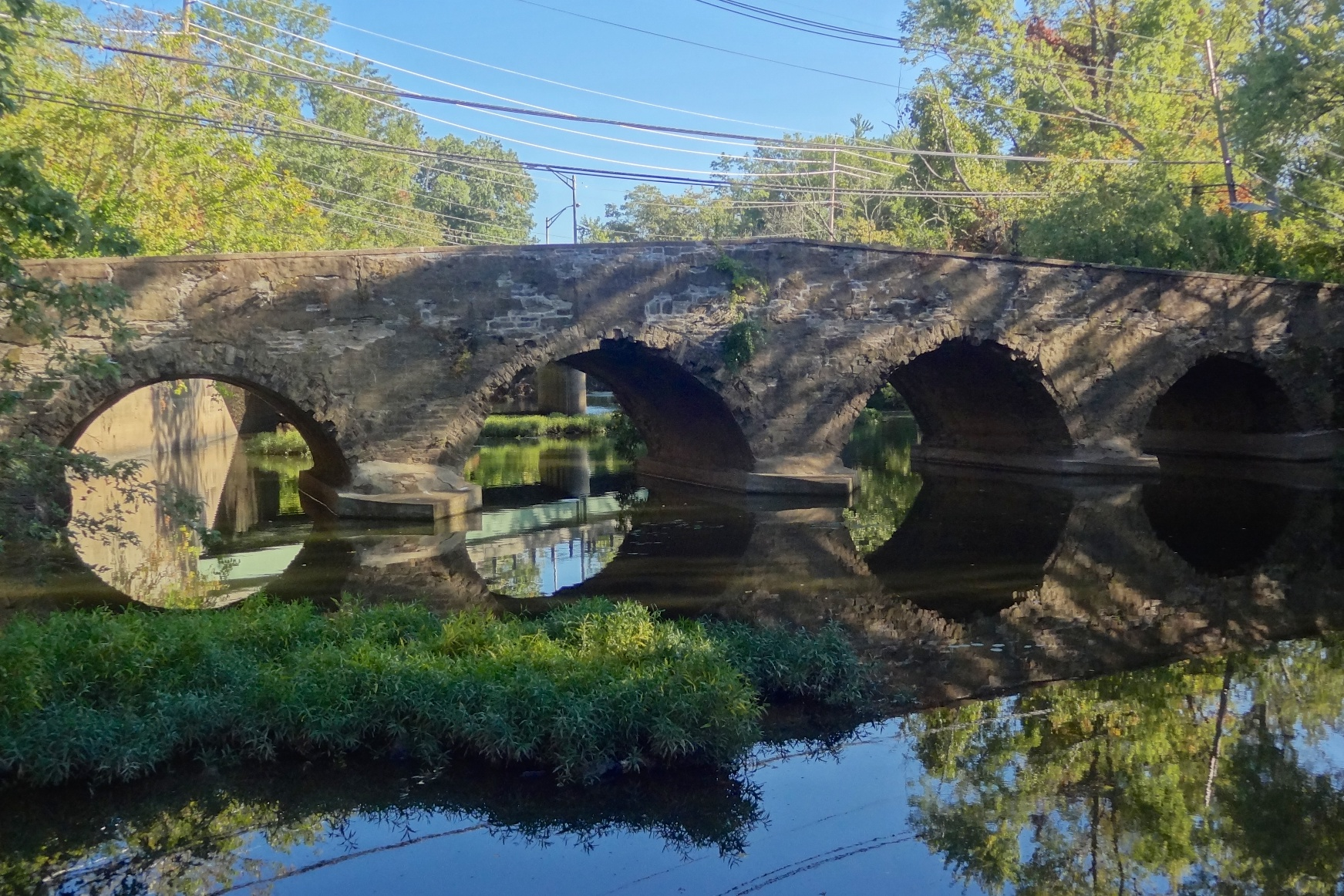
The Kingston Bridge (1798), built to replace one demolished by George Washington's troops to prevent British pursuit

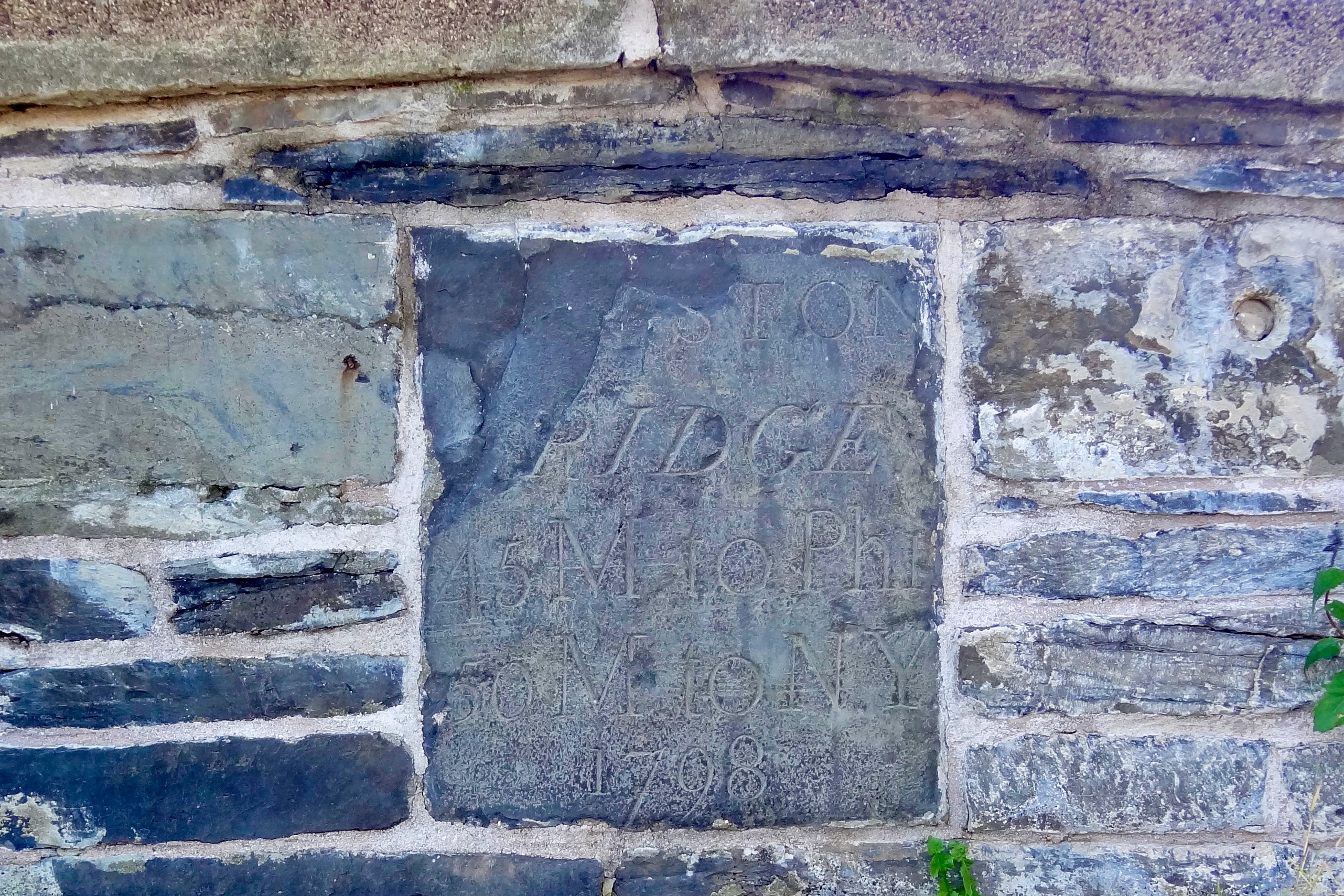
The mile marker from 1798, showing the distance to Philadelphia (45 miles) and New York City (50 miles)

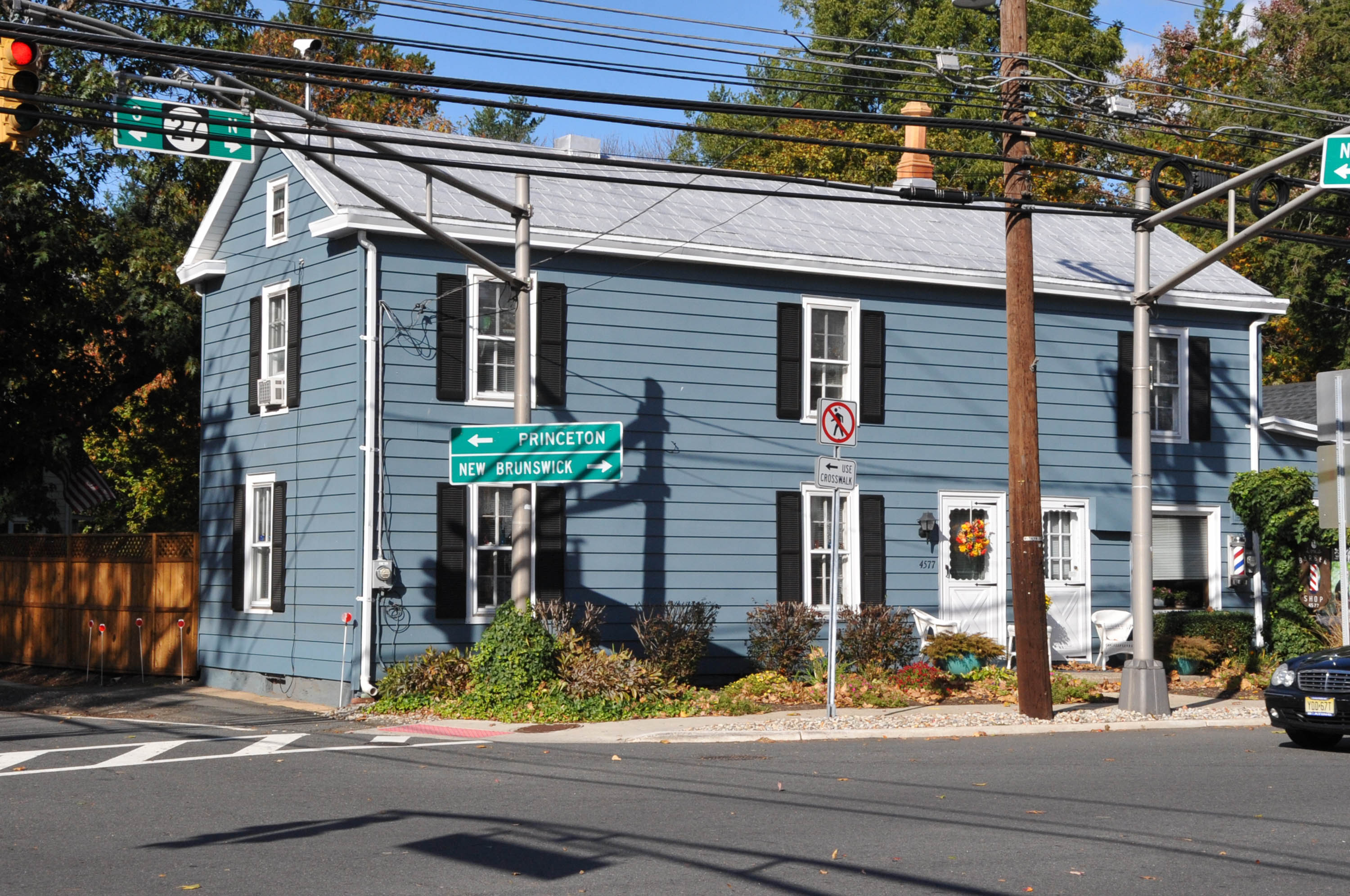
Colonial on King's Highway

== Infrastructure ==
=== Transportation ===
==== Roads and highways ====
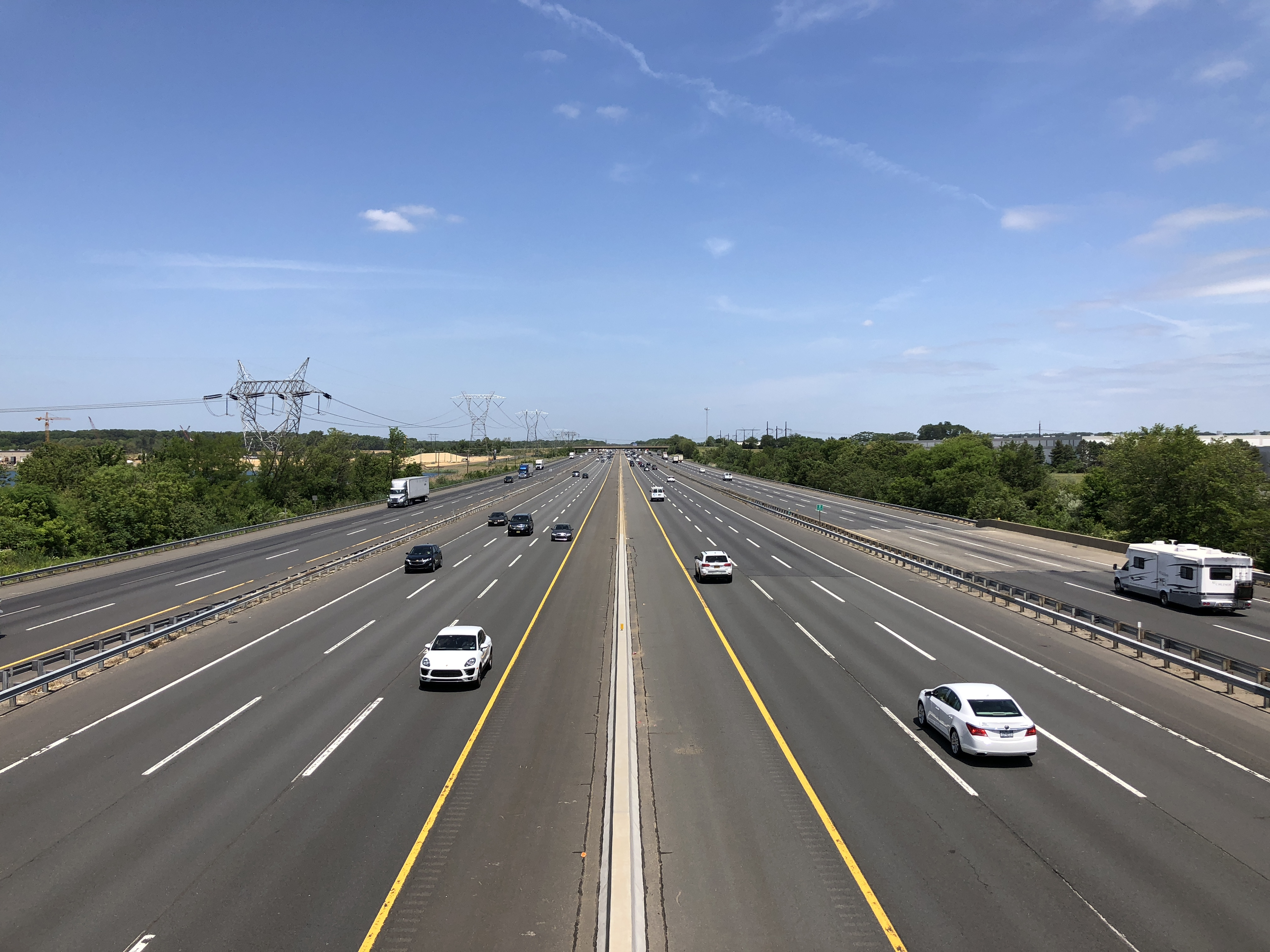
View north along the New Jersey Turnpike (Interstate 95) just north of Exit 8A in South Brunswick

As of May 2010, the township had a total of 192.83 miles (310.33 km) of roadways, of which 151.43 miles (243.70 km) were maintained by the municipality, 21.09 miles (33.94 km) by Middlesex County and 16.75 miles (26.96 km) by the New Jersey Department of Transportation and 3.56 miles (5.73 km) by the New Jersey Turnpike Authority.

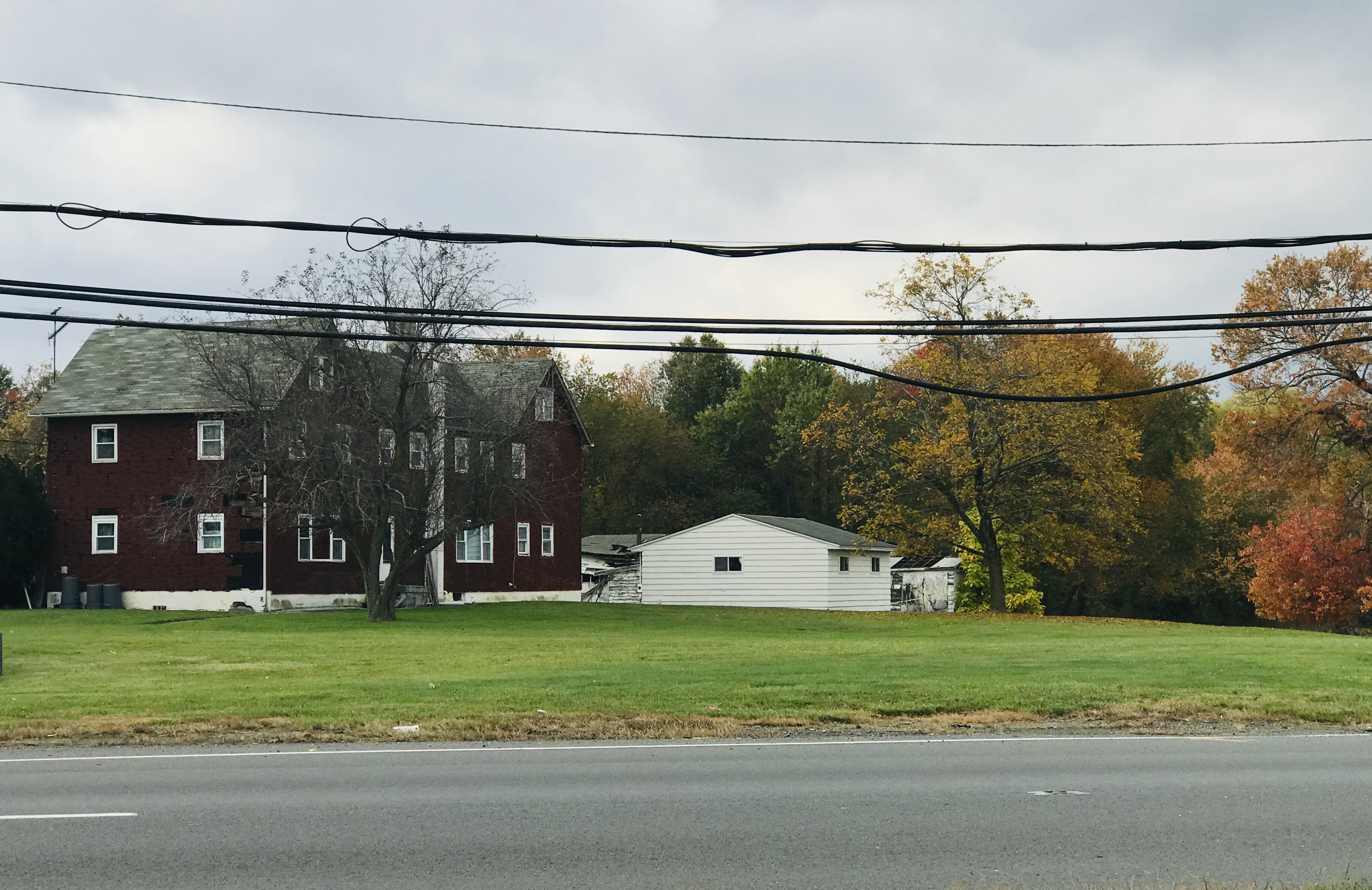
Homes along the side of U.S. Route 130 in South Brunswick

The most prominent highway passing through South Brunswick is a 3 1/2-mile (5.6 km) section of the New Jersey Turnpike (Interstate 95). This highway crosses the eastern part of the township, and a few ramps that lead to the toll gate for Interchange 8A pass through the township, with the majority of the interchange just outside the municipality's border in Monroe Township. Other major highways that the township also hosts include U.S. Route 1, U.S. Route 130, Route 27 and Route 32. County Route 535 and County Route 522 pass through the township.

A number of proposed Turnpike Authority maintained roads were to traverse South Brunswick. The first was the Driscoll Expressway which was to start from the Garden State Parkway at exit 80 in Toms River and end 3 miles (4.8 km) north of exit 8A along the turnpike in South Brunswick. This was cancelled in the 1980s. The other proposed road was a west-east spur, Route 92. While the majority of the spur was to be in South Brunswick, it was to begin at US 1, just north of the intersection with Ridge Road in South Brunswick, and terminate at the tollgate for Exit 8A. However this was cancelled on December 1, 2006.

==== Public transportation ====
Near the intersection of Route 32 and 130, there is a park and ride, where commuters can take buses to New York City. Suburban Transit offers service on Line 300 to the Port Authority Bus Terminal, Grand Central Terminal and Manhattan's East Side, while Line 600 serves Downtown Manhattan / Wall Street.

Commuter bus service to Midtown Manhattan is also offered by discount commuter transportation company OurBus, during peak hours.

The Middlesex County Area Transit (MCAT) Shuttle offers scheduled service across the county, with connections to NJ Transit buses and train service.

The Monmouth Ocean Middlesex Line is a proposal by New Jersey Transit to restore passenger railway service to the region. Herrod Boulevard and Monmouth Junction (where the line would conjoin with the Northeast Corridor) would be potential stops on the 'MOM' Line in South Brunswick.

The nearest train stations to the township are located at Princeton Junction and New Brunswick along the Northeast Corridor Line.

=== Healthcare ===
Penn Medicine Princeton Medical Center (commonly abbreviated as "PMC") is a regional hospital and healthcare network located in neighboring Plainsboro Township. The hospital services the greater Princeton region in central New Jersey. It is owned by the Penn Medicine Health System and is the only such hospital in the state of New Jersey. PMC is a 355-bed non-profit, tertiary, and academic medical center. Various physician services are located in South Brunswick, including in the community of Dayton.

Other nearby regional hospitals and healthcare networks that are accessible to the township include CentraState Medical Center in Freehold Township, the Old Bridge Township division of Raritan Bay Medical Center, and Saint Peter's University Hospital and Robert Wood Johnson University Hospital in nearby New Brunswick.

== Notable people ==
People who were born in, residents of, or otherwise closely associated with South Brunswick include:

- Leon Bibel (1913–1995), painter and printmaker during the Great Depression
- Mya Breitbart (born 1978), professor of biological oceanography at the University of South Florida's College of Marine Science who was awarded Popular Science magazine's 'Brilliant 10' for 2013
- Mike Elko (born 1977), head coach for the Texas A&M Aggies football team
- Donald Fagen (born 1948), musician and songwriter, best known as the co-founder of the rock band Steely Dan
- Jeffrey S. Juris (1971–2020), anthropologist, author, political activist and researcher, who studied the Occupy movement and other anti-globalization movements
- Edith King (1896–1973), stage and film actress
- Kirsten Lepore (born 1985), writer, director and animator at Marvel Studios.
- Ed Moran (born 1981), retired track and road runner who specialized in various long-distance disciplines who was a gold medalist in the 5000-meter race at the 2007 Pan American Games
- David Neumann (born 1965), dancer, actor, and Tony nominated choreographer
- Walter Perez, weekend morning co-anchor, journalist and weekday reporter for WPVI-TV, the ABC network affiliate in Philadelphia
- Steven Portnoy (born 1981), CBS News Radio White House correspondent
- Anna Quindlen (born 1952), best-selling author, journalist, and Pulitzer Prize-winning opinion columnist
- Ricardo Romero (born 1978), MMA fighter
- Mohamed Sanu (born 1989), wide receiver for the San Francisco 49ers
- Sydney Schneider (born 1999), goalkeeper for the UNC Wilmington Seahawks and the Jamaica women's national football team
- George Segal (1924–2000), painter and sculptor associated with the pop art movement, who was presented with a National Medal of Arts in 1999
- Justin Shorter (born 2000), American football wide receiver for the Buffalo Bills
- DeForest Soaries (born 1951), pastor and former chairman of the Election Assistance Commission
- Katherine Squibb (1949–2018), toxicologist who specialized in metal toxicity
- C. Vivian Stringer (born 1948), head coach for the Rutgers Scarlet Knights women's basketball team and one of the winningest coaches in women's college basketball history
- Tammy Tibbetts (born 1985), co-founder and CEO of the non-profit organization She's the First
- Isaiah Wong (born 2001), point guard / shooting guard for the Miami Hurricanes men's basketball team of the Atlantic Coast Conference (ACC)
- Cassie Yeung (born 1994), chef and TikToker
- Andrew Zwicker (born 1964), a physicist at the Princeton Plasma Physics Laboratory and a member of the New Jersey General Assembly representing the 16th Legislative District since January 2016
