= Local government in New Jersey =

Municipal and county governments in the US state

Local government in New Jersey is composed of counties and municipalities. Local jurisdictions in New Jersey differ from those in some other states because the entire area of the state is part of a municipality; each of the 564 municipalities is in exactly one county; and each of the 21 counties has more than one municipality. New Jersey has no independent cities, nor consolidated city-counties.

The forms of municipality in New Jersey are more complex than in most other states, though, potentially leading to misunderstandings regarding the governmental nature of an area and what local laws apply. All municipalities can be classified as one of five types of local government—Borough, City, Township, Town, and Village—and one of twelve forms of government, the first five being historically associated with the five types of government and the other seven being non-standard "optional" forms provided by the New Jersey Legislature.

To make matters more complex, New Jersey also distinguishes between regional, consolidated, and countywide school districts and school districts that serve only a single municipality. As well, the total area of any given airport may or may not lie completely within the boundaries of a given municipality—or even a given county. All local general purpose governments have equivalent legal powers, with the different forms and types reflecting the historical circumstances of the municipality's incorporation, similar to New England towns. For statistical purposes, the United States Census Bureau treats only boroughs, cities, towns, and villages as "municipalities", and townships as "townships"; the Census Bureau's classification does not reflect the underlying state law that draws no distinction among the five types.

== County ==
A clickable New Jersey county map

New Jersey is divided into 21 counties, each of which is governed by a Board of County Commissioners), which typically serves as both the legislative and executive body. The boards consist of three, five, seven, or nine members. The means of election of county commissioners varies from all county commissioners being elected in districts, all being elected at-large, or being elected through mixed district and at-large county commissioners. Elections are first past the post for single-member districts, and for at-large elections when only one seat is at stake. For at-large elections with more than one seat, plurality-at-large voting is used.

All counties in New Jersey hold organizational meetings on or right after New Year's Day. At this time the boards elect members to leadership positions on the boards. Depending upon the specific board these offices include director, deputy director, president, vice-president, chair, chair pro tempore, and vice-chair. Also at this organizational meeting each county commissioner is assigned as a liaison to one or more departments of the county.

Five counties (Atlantic, Bergen, Essex, Hudson, and Mercer) have a separately elected county executive. A sixth county, Union, has a county executive that is appointed by the board, analogous to the council–manager municipal form of government. In these counties, the Board of County Commissioners retains only legislative authority. Most of the rest of the counties also appoint a county supervisor or administrator who is responsible for routine administrative operations of the county government. New Jersey counties have powers that are intermediate between the broad powers of counties in Pennsylvania and the limited powers of counties in New York. Counties in New Jersey do not have tax collecting power.

== Municipality types ==
A map showcasing the types of government used by municipalities in New Jersey Borough City Town Township Village

New Jersey is unique in the United States for having five distinct types of incorporated municipalities. Each type of municipality has equal legal standing, rights, and powers as any other type or form. Unlike other parts of the United States, New Jersey does not have different tiers of power or legal standing for its municipal governments.

Each of the five types has an associated form of government of exactly the same title. By default municipalities have the form of government which corresponds to their type, i.e. a Township has the Township form of government. In New Jersey a municipality can choose a different form of government if its citizens do not wish to operate under the form that matches its type.

=== Borough ===
The borough form of government is New Jersey's most common, being used by 253 of the state's municipalities. Although it was once quite rare, the boroughitis phenomenon of the late 19th century led to the incorporation of large numbers of new boroughs.

=== City ===
A city in the context of local government in New Jersey refers to one of five types and one of eleven forms of municipal government. There are 52 cities in New Jersey. Despite the widely held perception of a city as a large, urban area, cities in New Jersey have a confused history as a form of government and vary in size from large, densely populated areas to much smaller hamlets.

=== Town ===
The town form of government dates back to the late 19th century when towns were first incorporated in the state. The town government law was rewritten in 1988. In this form of government, a mayor is elected at large plus eight councilmen – two from each of four wards. The mayor presides over council meetings and votes as a member of the council. The mayor has veto power over ordinances that can be overridden by a two-thirds vote of the council. All appointments to municipal offices are performed by the council. Currently, the state has 15 towns.

=== Township ===
The township form of government has a group of elected officials (the township committee) that serves as both the executive and legislative authority. This form of government is one of the oldest and is derived from the town meeting form of government used in New England, where the township committee has similar functions to the board of selectmen. The township committee has either three or five members elected at large. Every year, the committee chooses one of its members to be the "mayor", becoming the moderator for meetings of the township committee but having no special powers. In general, all legislative and executive powers are exercised by the committee as a whole. The committee, however, may appoint an administrator to oversee the day-to-day operations of the municipality. The township form of government is only available to municipalities that are of the township type. Out of the 240 townships in the state, the township form of government is used by 141.

=== Village ===
The village form of government was made possible by the Village Act of 1891. This form comprises a five-member Board of Trustees elected for staggered three-year terms. The board selects a president and a treasurer from among the members. New incorporations under this form were stopped in 1961.

While there are 4 municipalities that retain the Village type of government (Loch Arbour, Ridgefield Park, Ridgewood and South Orange), none of them still use the Village form of government. Loch Arbour was the last to do so, but on December 20, 2011, its residents voted to change to the Walsh Act form of government, with a three-member board of commissioners.

== Forms of municipal government ==
New Jersey municipalities are not restricted in their form of government by the type of municipality. Any type of municipality that chooses to do so can adopt one of the six standard optional forms of government listed below, with some exceptions. Municipalities may also adopt non-standard forms of government by having the state legislature enact a special charter.

=== Walsh Act of 1911 ===
The Walsh Act was enacted in the Progressive Era as a way to remove corruption and political influence from local politics. Voters elect three or five commissioners in non-partisan elections. Each commissioner is in charge of specific departments within the municipality, and all serve four-year concurrent terms. The commissioners exercise both legislative and executive powers. The commissioners elect one of their members as mayor, but s/he is usually first among equals with no powers over and above the other commissioners.

=== 1923 Municipal Manager Law ===
The Municipal Manager Law was enacted in 1923 and is an optional form of government available to any type of municipality. Under this form of government, a municipal council composed of three, five, seven, or nine members is elected at-large with a term of office typically of four years. The council appoints several key officials, namely the municipal manager, tax assessor, auditor, clerk, treasurer, and attorney. The manager is the chief executive of the municipality and is responsible for appointing other officials and preparing the budget for council consideration. The manager serves only at the pleasure of the council. A mayor is also chosen from among the council members whose primary duty is to preside over council meetings. Only seven municipalities currently use this form of government.

=== Optional Municipal Charter Law ===
In 1950 the state legislature passed the Optional Municipal Charter Law, more familiarly known as the Faulkner Act. In the post-World War II era there was a general push toward more efficiency and professionalism in municipal government, as well as the creation of stronger executives at all levels of government. The 1947 New Jersey State Constitution, a contemporary document, reflects these trends as well. Under the Faulkner Act, municipalities can choose one of four different options for their form of government. They are:

- Faulkner Act (council–manager)
- Faulkner Act (mayor–council)
- Faulkner Act (mayor–council–administrator)
- Faulkner Act (small municipality)

=== Special charter ===
New Jersey municipalities are not required to be governed by the Walsh Act, the 1923 Municipal Manager Law or the four forms of the Optional Municipal Charter Law (Faulkner Act). A community that finds all optional forms unsuitable may request a special charter from the state legislature. Such a charter, unique to this municipality, allows its government to be tailor-made to its needs.

== Changing a form of government ==
A Charter Study Commission is one of two options available to residents of New Jersey to pursue a change in their form of government. The other option is a direct petition. The charter study commission approach is only available under the Faulkner Act.

A charter study commission can be formed by a vote of the governing body. Alternatively, a ballot question to form a charter study commission can be performed through a petition or by the existing municipal governing body enacting an ordinance to form a commission. Voters simultaneously vote yes / no to form a commission and also vote to select its members (if it passes), with the top five candidates becoming the members of the commission.

== Communities ==
There is no territory in the state of New Jersey that is not part of an incorporated municipality. Some communities in the state of New Jersey are well-defined areas or neighborhoods that are part of one or more incorporated municipalities, but they are not independent municipalities in their own right. While these communities may have a sense of "communal character" and unique identity, they are all located within incorporated municipalities.

Some of the communities have official recognition as a census-designated place, such as Somerset, New Jersey which is part of Franklin Township. Other communities have their own ZIP Code because they have their own post office such as Neshanic Station (ZIP Code 08853), which is part of Branchburg Township, or Deans, which is part of South Brunswick Township. Other communities were once single-owner large farms that were later incorporated into a neighboring township such as Middlebush, New Jersey. Some smaller communities are incorporated into larger urban areas, such as when Greenville was merged into Jersey City as a neighborhood.

== School districts ==
New Jersey distinguishes between regional, consolidated, and countywide districts and those serving single municipalities. There are also non-operating school districts, which are those districts that do not operate any school facilities and where all students attend school in other districts as part of sending/receiving relationships. The majority of school districts in New Jersey are established for general purposes, have boundaries equivalent to the municipality with which they are associated, and are classified as either Type I or Type II school districts.

The schools of each public school district are governed by a board of education. Type I school districts include every local school district established in a city except where the district has changed its classification, and the board of education consists of five, seven or nine members, while in cities of the first class (cities with a population of over 150,000) the board of education must consist of nine members, and board members are appointed to three-year terms by the mayor or other chief executive of the municipality that constitutes the district. Type II school districts include all local districts in municipalities other than cities, all consolidated school districts, and all regional school districts, and can have either an elected board of education, where the board consists of nine members unless by law the number was reduced to three, five or seven members, elected at annual school elections for terms of three years, or appointed board of education, where members are appointed by the mayor or other chief executive officer of the municipality for five-year terms (for five-member boards) and three-year terms (for seven- and nine-member boards). Board of education members must be United States citizens, residents of their school districts for at least one year immediately preceding their appointment or election to the board, be registered to vote in the district, must be able to read and write English, cannot receive any compensation for their board service, and their conduct is governed by a code of ethics and the New Jersey School Ethics. All meetings of boards of education must be held in public, with certain exceptions, according to the Open Public Meetings Act.

There is a superintendent for each district (which may be shared between districts), and a county superintendent of schools (the state Department of Education's representative) and executive county superintendent of schools (gubernatorial appointments whose duties include reducing district spending, collaboration and shared services) in each county.

State law authorizes school districts:

- to share superintendents and business administrators (N.J.S.A. 18A:14.1 and 18A:24.1NJSA does not have these chapters),
- to participate in joint insurance funds (N.J.S.A 18A:18B-3),
- to provide jointly for pupil transportation (N.J.S.A 18A:39-11),
- child study team services and facilities and services for students with disabilities (N.J.S.A 18A:46-5.1, N.J.S.A 18A:46-24),
- nursing services to nonpublic schools (N.J.S.A 18A:40-28),
- to establish various statewide, regional, county or multi-district entities offering shared or joint services, including educational service commissions (N.J.S.A 18A:6-51 et seq.),
- to establish county special services school districts (N.J.S.A 18A:46-29),
- to establish statewide distance learning networks (N.J.S.A 18A:7F-22),
- to establish educational improvement resource centers (N.J.S.A 18A:95.1-1), and
- to use the statewide textbook bank (N.J.S.A 18A:34-3).

=== State intervention ===
The state Commissioner of Education has the power of "state intervention", to intervene in governance of a local public school district (and to intervene in the areas of instruction and program, operations, personnel, and fiscal management) if the Commissioner has determined that a school district has failed, or is unable, to take corrective actions necessary to establish a thorough and efficient system of education. When the state intervenes in governance of a school district, the board of education acts in an advisory capacity only, and ultimate authority is in a state district superintendent appointed by the State Board of Education. From 1987 to 2005, the State Board of Education had the power to take over an entire school district and manage it as a "state-operated school district", which was replaced by the legislature in 2005 with state intervention.

Using this power, the state has assumed the operation of Newark Public Schools, Jersey City Public Schools, and Paterson Public Schools, which are in various stages of returning governance to local control: In Jersey City, governance has been restored to local control in the form of an elected school board, although the state district superintendent remains to manage curriculum functions, while in Newark and Paterson governance has yet to change from state to local management.

== See also ==
- List of municipalities in New Jersey
