= County Route 529 (New Jersey) =

County highway in New Jersey, U.S.

County Route 529
- CR 529 highlighted in red

Route information
- Length: 10.5 mi (16.9 km)
- Existed: January 1, 1953–present

Major junctions
- South end: CR 514 in Edison
- US 1 in Edison; Route 27 in Edison; CR 501 in Piscataway; I-287 in Piscataway; Route 28 in Dunellen; US 22 in Green Brook
- North end: CR 527 in Watchung

Location
- Country: United States
- State: New Jersey
- Counties: Middlesex, Somerset

Highway system
- County routes in New Jersey; 500-series routes
← CR 528	→ CR 530

County Route 529 (CR 529) is a county highway in the U.S. state of New Jersey. The highway extends 10.5 miles (16.9 km) from Woodbridge Avenue (CR 514) in Edison to Mountain Boulevard (CR 527) in Watchung.

== Route description ==
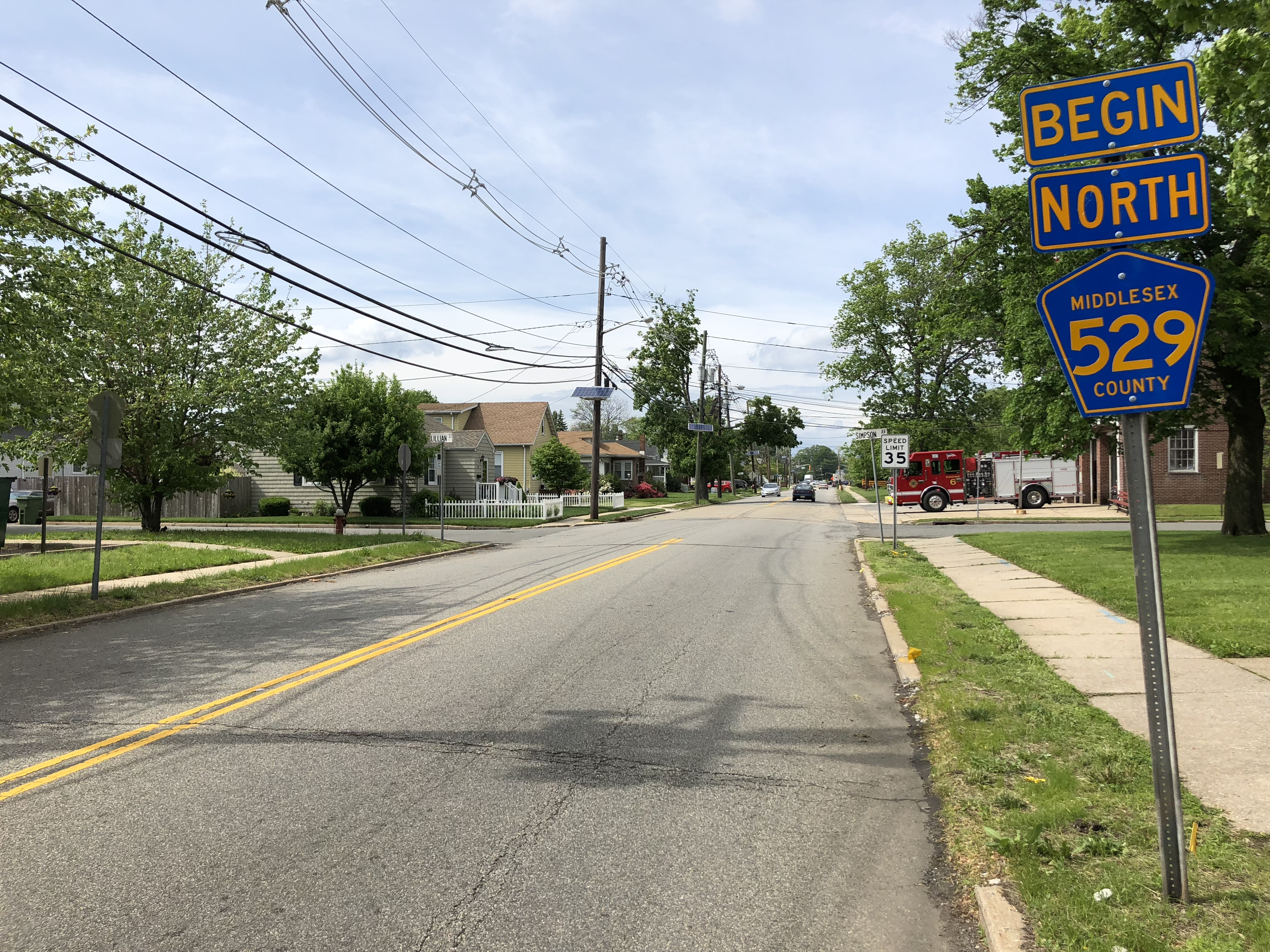
CR 529's southern terminus at CR 514 in Edison

CR 529 begins at an intersection of Woodbridge Avenue (CR 514) in Edison, Middlesex County, heading north on two-lane undivided Plainfield Avenue. The road passes through residential areas before reaching an intersection with US 1 in commercial areas. Past this intersection, the route passes more suburban neighborhoods as it crosses the intersection of Lincoln Highway (Route 27) near more businesses and begins to turn northwest. The road passes under Amtrak's Northeast Corridor near the Edison station on NJ Transit's Northeast Corridor Line. From here, CR 529 heads north as a four-lane undivided road that passes near industrial and commercial development with some homes. The road enters Piscataway, where the name becomes Stelton Road and narrows back to two lanes, passing a mix of homes and businesses. After an intersection of New Durham Road (CR 501), the route runs northwest along the border between Piscataway to the west and South Plainfield to the east as a four-lane undivided road into commercial areas, soon widening into a divided highway at the intersection of Metlars Lane (CR 609). The divided highway portion of CR 529 ends as it comes to an interchange with I-287.

From this interchange, the route intersects with Hamilton Boulevard (CR 603) and enters areas of homes and businesses, turning west into industrial areas again fully within Piscataway again and intersects with Washington Avenue (CR 665). After joining with CR 665, CR 529 makes a sharp turn north, crossing the Conrail Shared Assets Operations' Port Reading Secondary line and CR 665 splits from the road by turning west on Stelton Road. At this point, the route becomes two-lane Washington Avenue and runs north through residential areas, passing over New Market Pond and Conrail Shared Assets Operations' Lehigh Line on a bridge. Farther north, the road crosses the intersection of Vail Avenue/West 7th Street (CR 601) before heading into Dunellen. In this area, CR 529 begins to turn more to the northwest, intersecting with Walnut Street (CR 678) and New Market Road (CR 665) before passing under NJ Transit's Raritan Valley Line near the Dunellen station. Immediately after, the route crosses the intersection of North Avenue (Route 28) in the commercial downtown area of Dunellen. Following this, CR 529 passes more homes before crossing into Green Brook, Somerset County in a wooded area. At this point, the route widens to four lanes and enters commercial areas, crossing the intersection of Greenbrook Road (CR 634) prior to reaching an intersection of US 22. After US 22, CR 529 begins to ascend the First Watchung Mountain and winds northeast into Washington Rock State Park, with the road name changing to Rock Road East. The road curves northwest into Watchung, becoming Washington Rock Road and heads through wooded residential neighborhoods, descending the mountain as CR 529 comes to its north end at the intersection of Mountain Boulevard (CR 527).

== Major intersections ==
County	Location	mi	km	Destinations	Notes
Middlesex	Edison	0.0	0.0	CR 514 (Woodbridge Avenue)	Southern terminus
Middlesex	Edison	0.25	0.40	US 1 to N.J. Turnpike – New Brunswick, Newark	
Middlesex	Edison	1.0	1.6	Route 27 (Lincoln Highway)	
Middlesex	Piscataway	3.5	5.6	CR 501 east (New Durham Road)	Western terminus of CR 501
Middlesex	Piscataway	4.4	7.1	I-287 to G.S. Parkway / N.J. Turnpike	Exit 5 (I-287)
Middlesex	Dunellen	7.5	12.1	Route 28 (North Avenue) – Bound Brook, Plainfield	
Somerset	Green Brook Township	8.5	13.7	US 22 – Somerville, Newark	
Somerset	Watchung	10.5	16.9	CR 527 (Mountain Boulevard)	Northern terminus
1.000 mi = 1.609 km; 1.000 km = 0.621 mi
