= Hovanec =

Hovanec is a surname. Notable people with the surname include:

- Helene Hovanec, American puzzle designer
- Robert Hovanec (born 1993), American sprinter
