= Vail–Trust House =

Historic house in New Jersey, United States

- U.S. National Register of Historic Places
- New Jersey Register of Historic Places
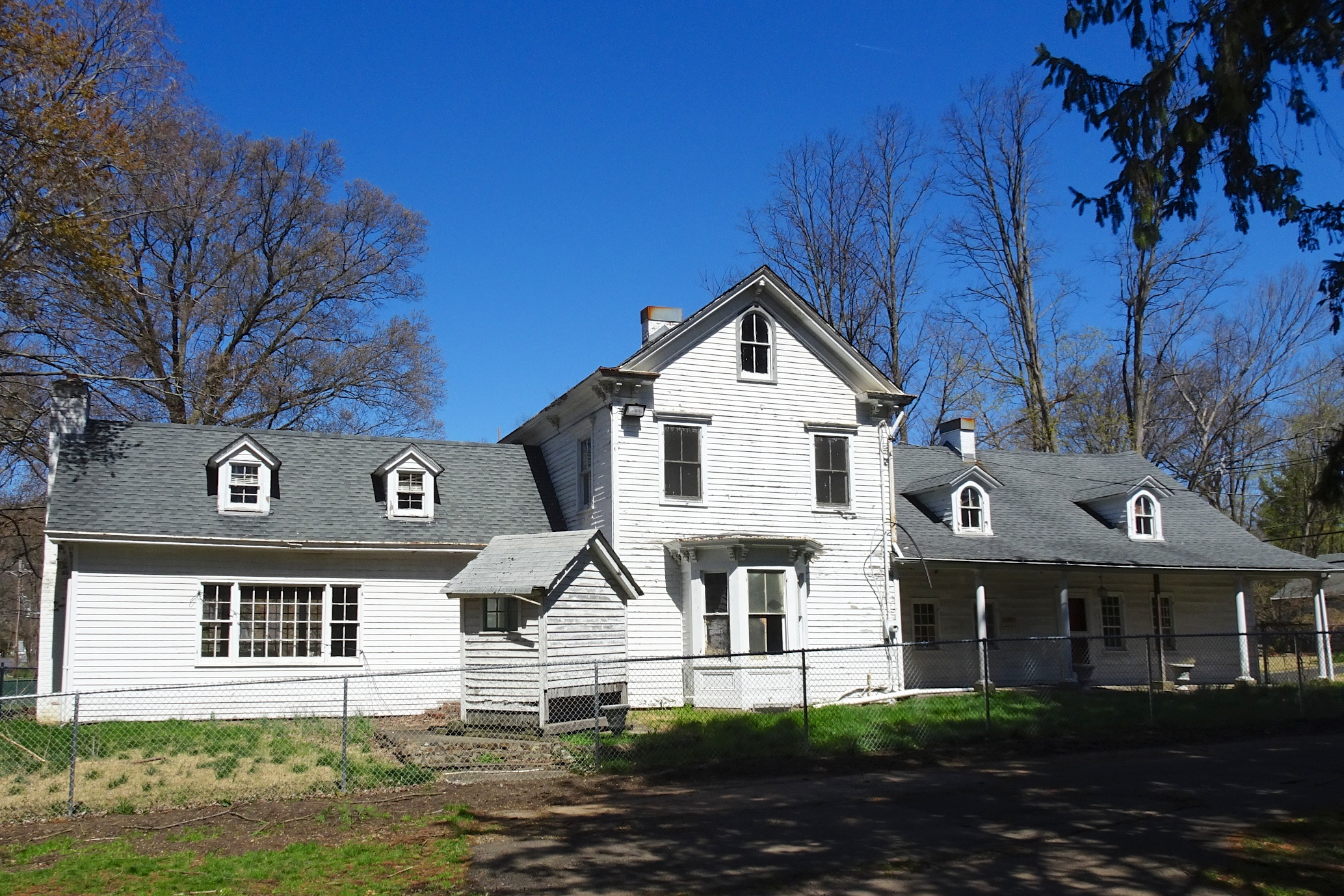
- Vail–Trust House in 2016

- Location within Somerset County, New Jersey Location within New Jersey Location within the United States
- Location: 255 Greenbrook Road, Green Brook Township, New Jersey
- Coordinates: 40°35′19″N 74°29′42″W
- Area: 4.7 acres (1.9 ha)
- Built by: John Runyon
- Architectural style: Federal, Italianate, Colonial Revival
- NRHP reference No.: 08000972
- NJRHP No.: 3448

Significant dates
- Added to NRHP: October 7, 2008
- Designated NJRHP: July 24, 2008

The Vail–Trust House is a historic building located at 255 Greenbrook Road in Green Brook Township, Somerset County, New Jersey. It was added to the National Register of Historic Places on October 7, 2008, for its significance in architecture.

== History ==
The house site is on an 80-acre (32 ha) property that was acquired by Stephen Vail (1710–1777) on May 20, 1747, from the estate of Gideon Mortall. After his death, the property passed to his son, Thomas Vail (c. 1733–1792). In 1792, it passed to his son, Peter Vail (1764–1842), and is about when the oldest section of the house was built. He sold the property in 1833. After several ownership changes, it was purchased by Herman Trust on February 24, 1866. In 1876, he contracted a carpenter, John Runyon of Dunellen, to build the two-story center section.

== Description ==
The Vail–Trust House has three main sections. The eastern section is the oldest, built c. 1790, and has a 20th-century Colonial Revival porch. The interior shows Federal style. The center section was built c. 1876 with Italianate style. The western section is 20th century Colonial Revival.

The nearby Wagon House was built in the 19th century.

== Gallery ==
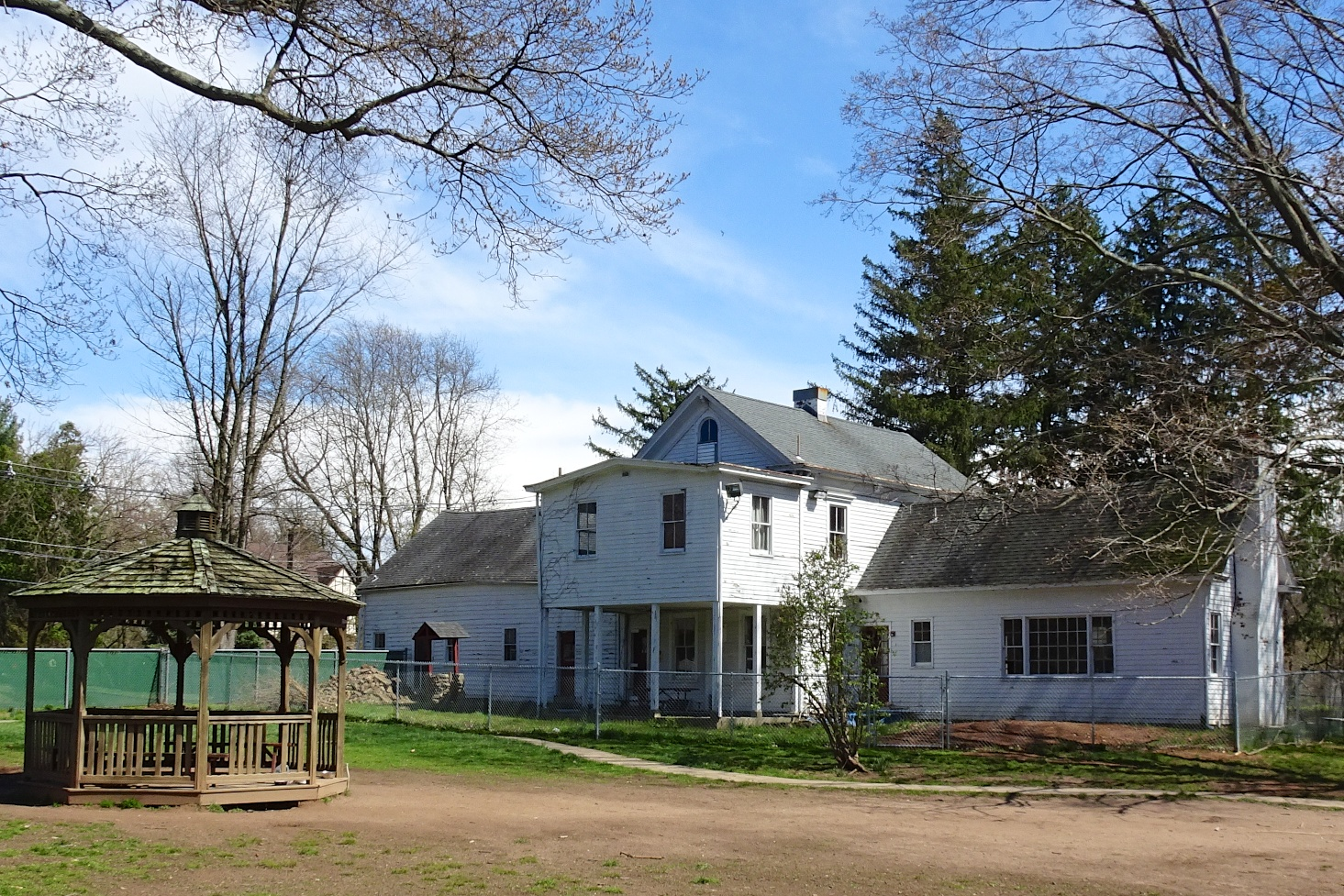
Vail–Trust House, north view

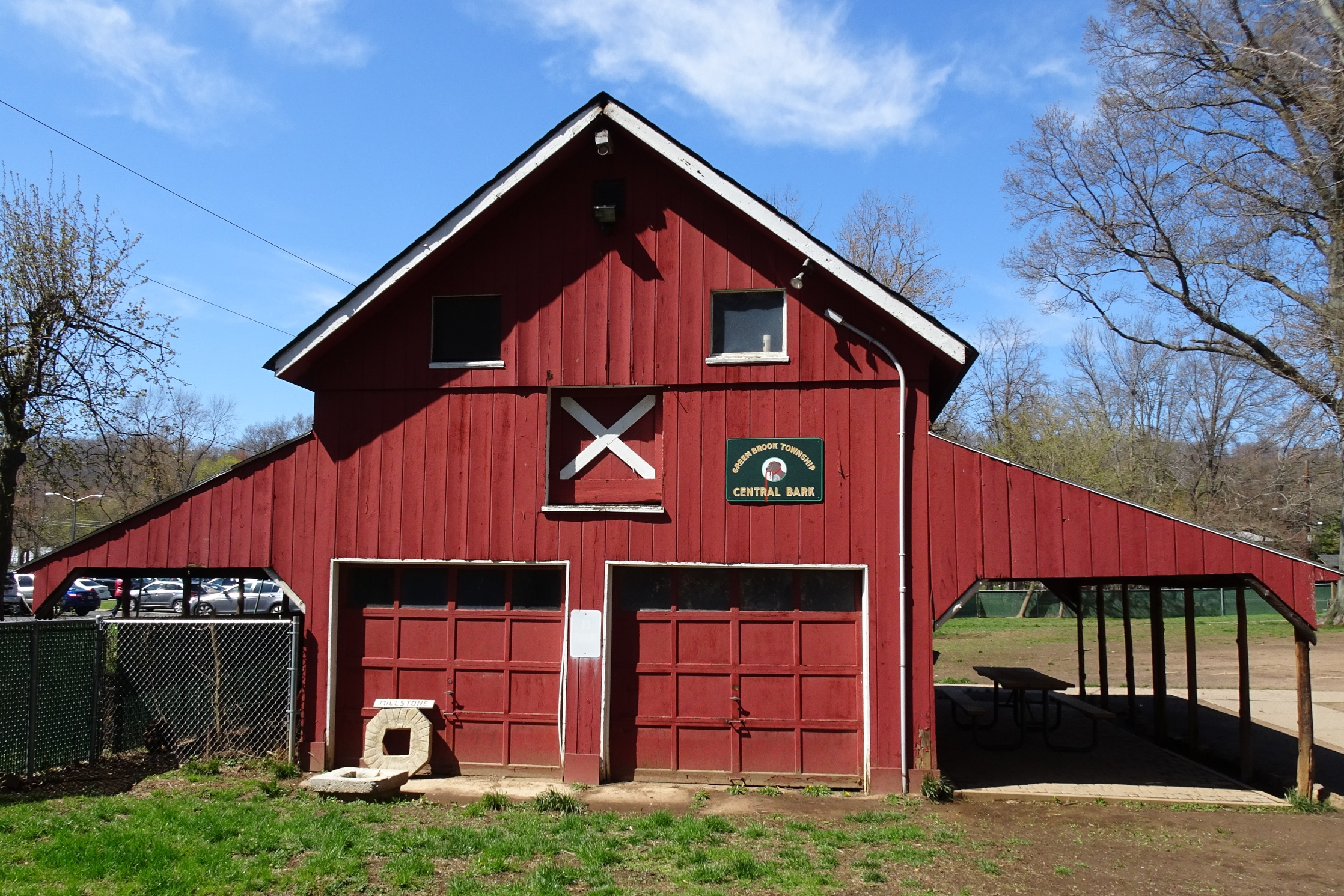
Wagon House
