= Green Brook Township, New Jersey =

Township in Somerset County, New Jersey, US

- Township
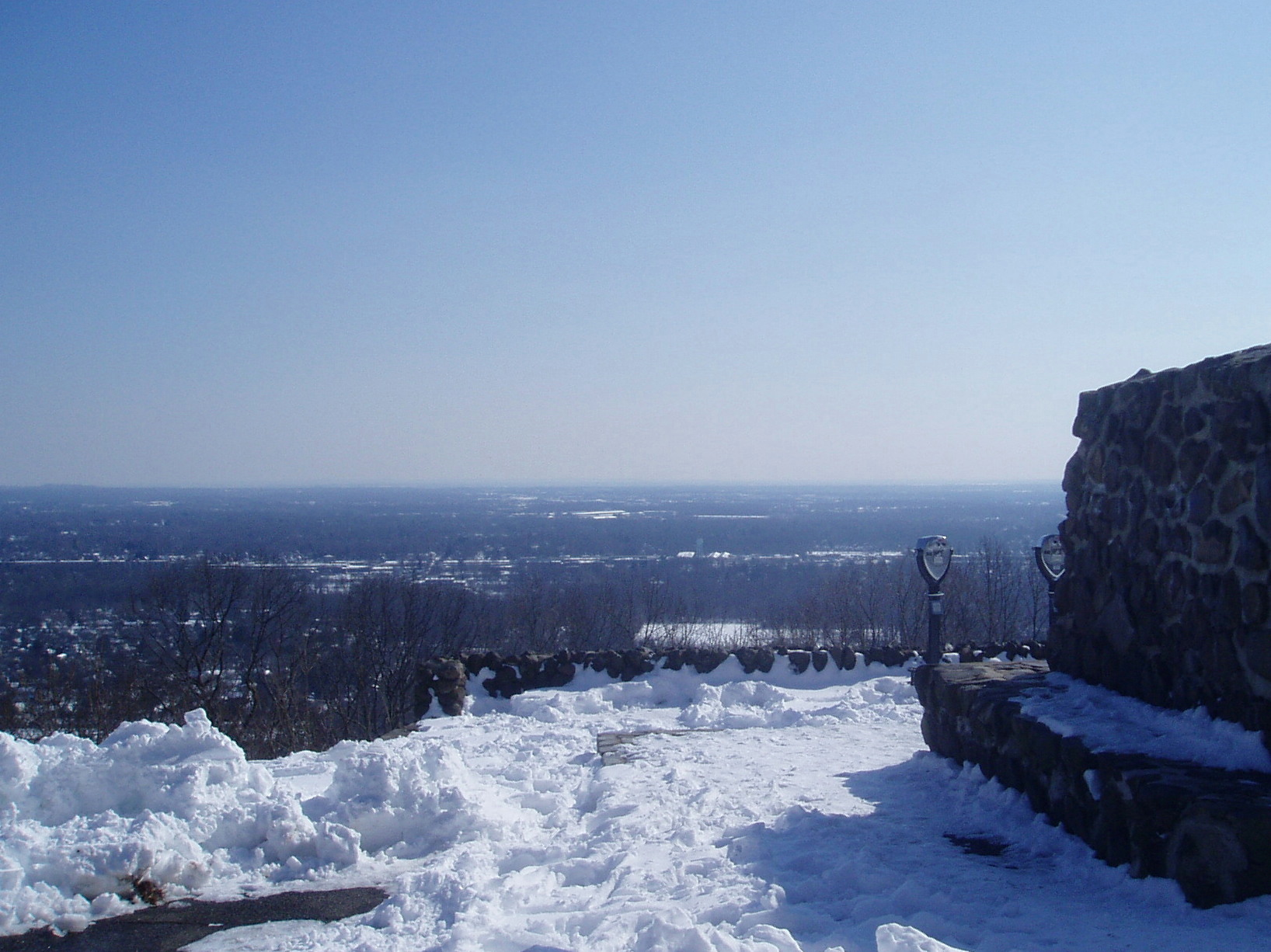
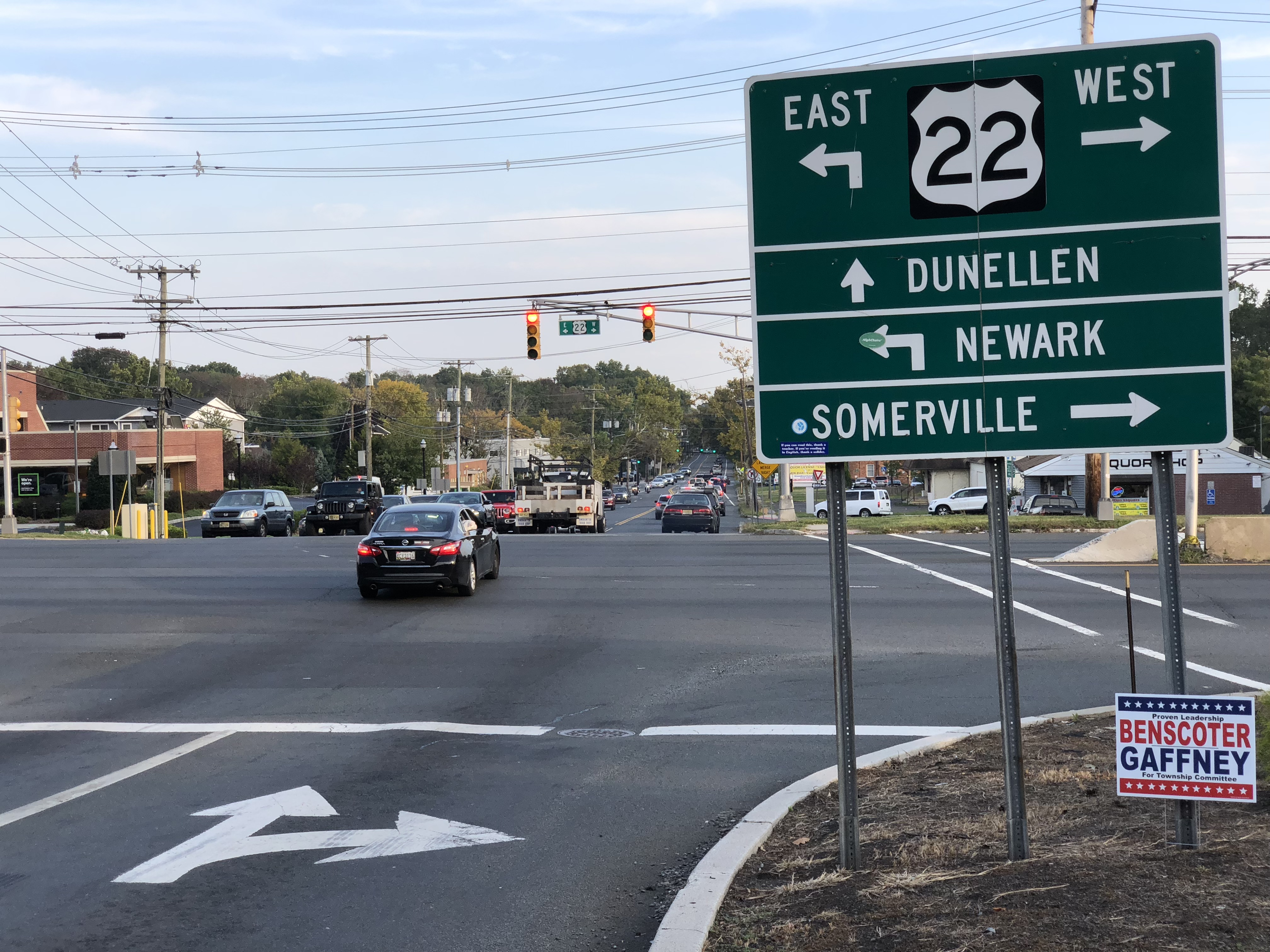
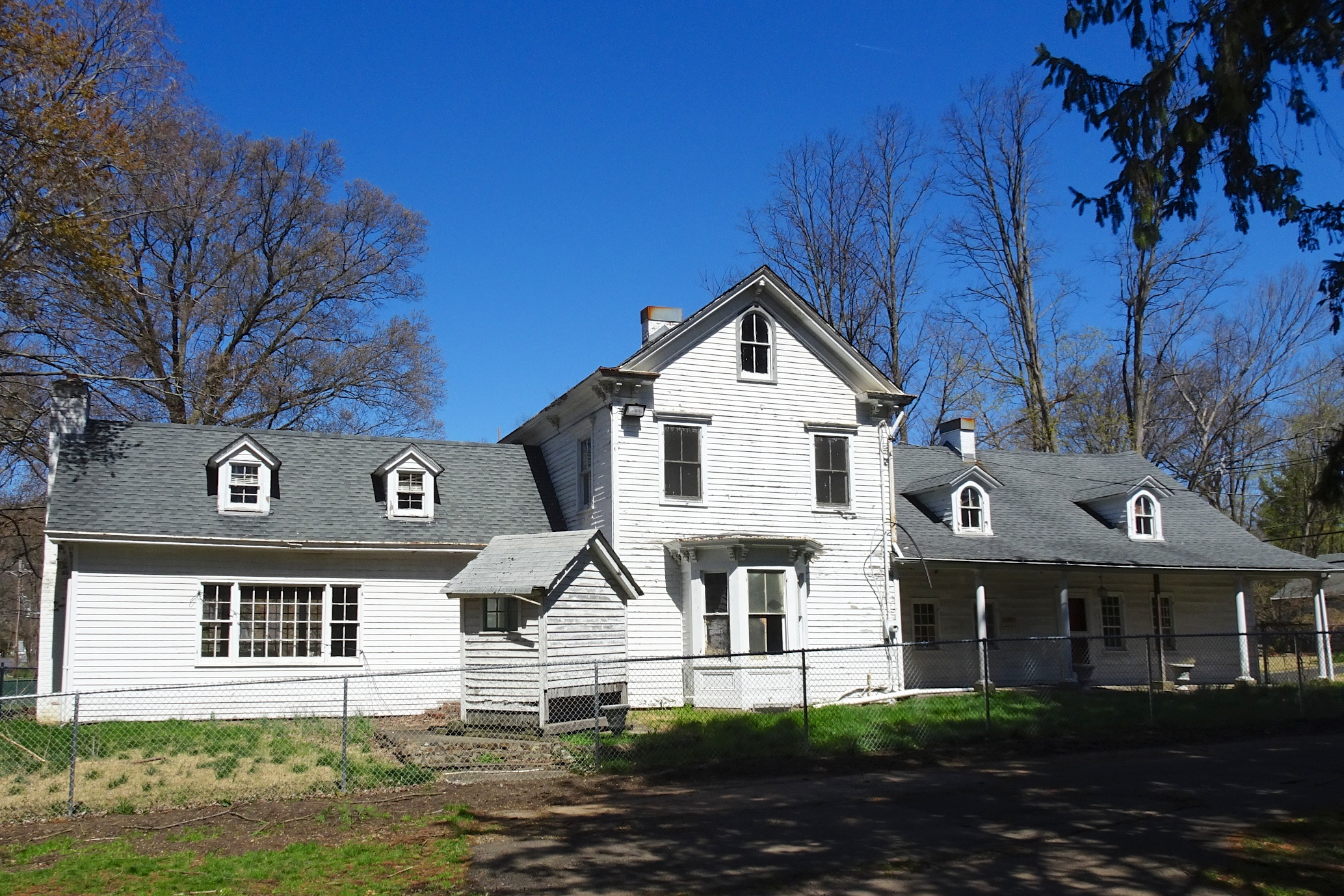
- Washington Rock State Park Washington Avenue at the intersection of U.S. Route 22 Vail–Trust House

- Seal
- Motto(s): "Small Enough to Know You, Large Enough to Get Things Done".
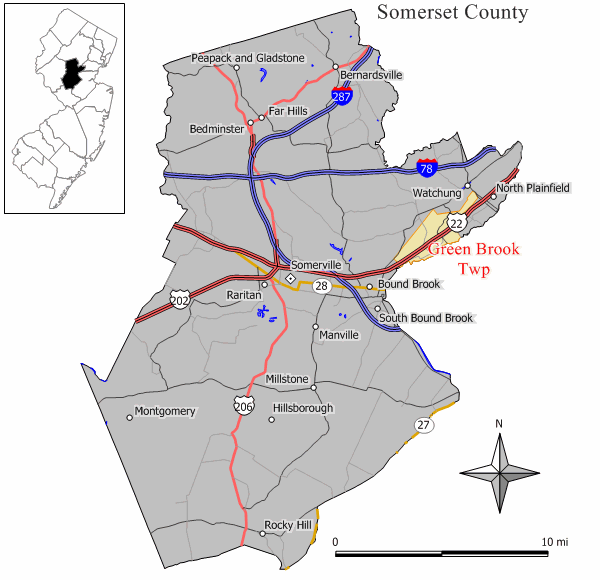
- Location of Green Brook Township in Somerset County highlighted in yellow (right). Inset map: Location of Somerset County in New Jersey highlighted in black (left).

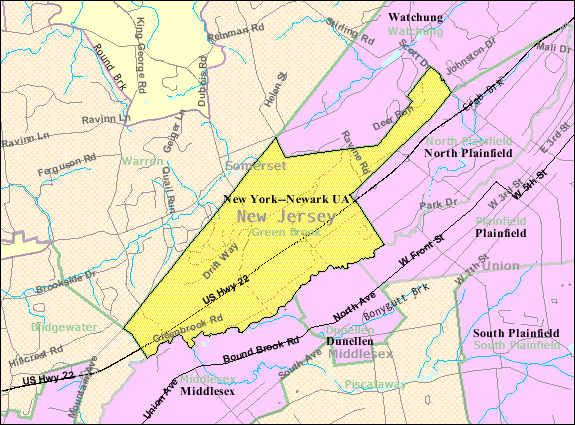
- Census Bureau map of Green Brook Township, New Jersey.
- Interactive map of Green Brook Township, New Jersey
- Location in Somerset County Location in New Jersey Location in the United States
- Coordinates: 40.603832°N 74.483208°W
- Country: United States
- State: New Jersey
- County: Somerset
- Incorporated: April 2, 1872 (as North Plainfield Township)
- Reincorporated: November 8, 1932 (as Green Brook Township)
- Named for: Green Brook

Government
  - Type: Township
  - Body: Township Committee
  - Mayor: James Van Arsdale (R, term ends December 31, 2023)
  - Administrator / Municipal clerk: Kelly G. Cupit

Area
  - Total: 4.41 sq mi (11.43 km^{2})
  - Land: 4.41 sq mi (11.42 km^{2})
  - Water: 0.0077 sq mi (0.02 km^{2}) 0.18%
  - Rank: 285th of 565 in state 13th of 21 in county
- Elevation: 246 ft (75 m)

Population (2020)
  - Total: 7,281
  - Estimate (2023): 7,291
  - Rank: 312th of 565 in state 15th of 21 in county
  - Density: 1,652.1/sq mi (637.9/km^{2})
  - Rank: 325th of 565 in state 7th of 21 in county
- Time zone: UTC−05:00 (Eastern (EST))
  - Summer (DST): UTC−04:00 (Eastern (EDT))
- ZIP Code: 08812
- Area code: 732 and 908
- FIPS code: 3403527510
- GNIS feature ID: 0882172
- Website: www.greenbrooktwp.org

Green Brook Township is a township in Somerset County, in the U.S. state of New Jersey. It is centrally located within the Raritan Valley region. As of the 2020 United States census, the township's population was 7,281, an increase of 78 (+1.1%) from the 2010 census count of 7,203, which in turn reflected an increase of 1,549 (+27.4%) from the 5,654 counted in the 2000 census.

What is now Green Brook was originally created as North Plainfield Township on April 2, 1872, from portions of Warren Township. Portions of the township were taken to form North Plainfield (June 9, 1885) and Watchung (March 23, 1926). Green Brook was incorporated as a township by an act of the New Jersey Legislature on November 8, 1932, replacing North Plainfield Township, based on the results of a referendum held that same day.

Green Brook describes itself as "Small Enough to Know You, Large Enough to Get Things Done". Most of Green Brook shares ZIP Code 08812 with Dunellen.

== History ==
In 1872, a tract of land was subdivided off from Warren Township. Thirteen years later, in 1885, the Borough of North Plainfield was created from a section of the subdivided land. The land at that time was designated as North Plainfield. In 1926, the Borough of Watchung was carved out of North Plainfield Township. The municipality's name was changed to Green Brook Township in 1932.

Green Brook Township takes its name from the waterway that passes through the township called the Green Brook that rises in the Watchung Mountains several miles away, feeding from many smaller brooks and ponds along the way, as it flows in a southwesterly direction for a distance of 15 miles (24 km). It then continues southwestward and flows into the Raritan River at Bound Brook, which provides access to the New York City area and the Atlantic Ocean. The brook was named for the color of its water.

Also contained within the township is Washington Rock State Park, which commemorates the spot where George Washington and Marquis de Lafayette watched the movement of the British soldiers during the American Revolutionary War, mainly the months of May and June 1777. The park was established on March 17, 1913, and is about 34 acres (140,000 m^{2}) in size.

Raritan Valley Hospital in Green Brook was the first teaching hospital of Rutgers Medical School when in 1972 the school expanded to become a full four-year medical school. The hospital had opened in 1966 and was closed in 1981, with the subsequent conversion to the Green Brook Regional Center, a facility caring for the elderly with disabilities.

== Geography ==
According to the United States Census Bureau, the township had a total area of 4.42 square miles (11.43 km^{2}), including 4.41 square miles (11.42 km^{2}) of land and 0.01 square miles (0.02 km^{2}) of water (0.18%).

The township is in the Raritan Valley, a line of places in central New Jersey. Green Brook lies in the northern division of Raritan Valley along with the borough of North Plainfield.

Unincorporated communities, localities and place names located partially or completely within the township include Seeley Mills and Washington Rock.

The township borders the municipalities of Bridgewater Township, North Plainfield, Warren Township and Watchung in Somerset County; Middlesex and Dunellen in Middlesex County; and Plainfield in Union County.

== Demographics ==
Historical population
Census	Pop.	Note	%±
1880	3,217		—
1890	4,250		32.1%
1900	654	*	−84.6%
1910	886		35.5%
1920	1,116		26.0%
1930	544	*	−51.3%
1940	763		40.3%
1950	1,155		51.4%
1960	3,622		213.6%
1970	4,302		18.8%
1980	4,640		7.9%
1990	4,460		−3.9%
2000	5,654		26.8%
2010	7,203		27.4%
2020	7,281		1.1%
2023 (est.)	7,291		0.1%
Population sources: 1880–1920 1880–1890; 1890–1910 1910–1930; 1940–2000 2000; 2010 2020 * = Lost territory in previous decade.

=== 2020 census ===
Green Brook Township, Somerset County, New Jersey – Racial and ethnic composition (NH = Non-Hispanic) Note: the US Census treats Hispanic/Latino as an ethnic category. This table excludes Latinos from the racial categories and assigns them to a separate category. Hispanics/Latinos may be of any race.
Race / Ethnicity	Pop 2010	Pop 2020	% 2010	% 2020
White alone (NH)	4,917	4,134	68.26%	56.78%
Black or African American alone (NH)	238	313	3.30%	4.30%
Native American or Alaska Native alone (NH)	1	5	0.01%	0.07%
Asian alone (NH)	1,453	1,743	20.17%	23.94%
Pacific Islander alone (NH)	1	0	0.01%	0.00%
Some Other Race alone (NH)	7	34	0.10%	0.47%
Mixed Race/Multi-Racial (NH)	92	209	1.28%	2.87%
Hispanic or Latino (any race)	494	843	6.86%	11.58%
Total	7,203	7,281	100.00%	100.00%

=== 2010 census ===
The 2010 United States census counted 7,203 people, 2,375 households, and 1,945 families in the township. The population density was 1,610.5 per square mile (621.8/km^{2}). There were 2,448 housing units at an average density of 547.3 per square mile (211.3/km^{2}). The racial makeup was 73.54% (5,297) White, 3.37% (243) Black or African American, 0.04% (3) Native American, 20.21% (1,456) Asian, 0.04% (3) Pacific Islander, 1.12% (81) from other races, and 1.67% (120) from two or more races. Hispanic or Latino of any race were 6.86% (494) of the population.

Of the 2,375 households, 42.1% had children under the age of 18; 69.6% were married couples living together; 9.6% had a female householder with no husband present and 18.1% were non-families. Of all households, 14.6% were made up of individuals and 5.2% had someone living alone who was 65 years of age or older. The average household size was 2.96 and the average family size was 3.30.

26.4% of the population were under the age of 18, 5.8% from 18 to 24, 23.0% from 25 to 44, 31.4% from 45 to 64, and 13.5% who were 65 years of age or older. The median age was 42.1 years. For every 100 females, the population had 93.3 males. For every 100 females ages 18 and older there were 90.3 males.

The Census Bureau's 2006–2010 American Community Survey showed that (in 2010 inflation-adjusted dollars) median household income was $115,268 (with a margin of error of +/− $15,162) and the median family income was $123,796 (+/− $10,668). Males had a median income of $74,231 (+/− $16,708) versus $75,703 (+/− $8,965) for females. The per capita income for the borough was $49,068 (+/− $5,197). About 0.9% of families and 1.3% of the population were below the poverty line, including 1.8% of those under age 18 and 1.7% of those age 65 or over.

=== 2000 census ===
As of the 2000 United States census there were 5,654 people, 1,893 households, and 1,508 families residing in the township. The population density was 1,234.7 inhabitants per square mile (476.7/km^{2}). There were 1,916 housing units at an average density of 418.4 per square mile (161.5/km^{2}). The racial makeup of the township was 88.43% White, 1.68% African American, 0.07% Native American, 7.99% Asian, 0.04% Pacific Islander, 0.71% from other races, and 1.08% from two or more races. Hispanic or Latino of any race were 4.09% of the population.

There were 1,893 households, out of which 37.0% had children under the age of 18 living with them, 69.0% were married couples living together, 7.9% had a female householder with no husband present, and 20.3% were non-families. 15.9% of all households were made up of individuals, and 6.2% had someone living alone who was 65 years of age or older. The average household size was 2.84 and the average family size was 3.20.

In the township the population was spread out, with 24.3% under the age of 18, 4.8% from 18 to 24, 30.5% from 25 to 44, 24.8% from 45 to 64, and 15.6% who were 65 years of age or older. The median age was 40 years. For every 100 females, there were 91.7 males. For every 100 females age 18 and over, there were 89.0 males.

The median income for a household in the township was $80,644, and the median income for a family was $87,744. Males had a median income of $52,147 versus $46,434 for females. The per capita income for the township was $37,290. About 1.7% of families and 2.4% of the population were below the poverty line, including 0.9% of those under age 18 and 5.5% of those age 65 or over.

== Government ==
=== Local government ===
Green Brook Township is governed under the Township form of New Jersey municipal government, one of 141 municipalities (of the 564) statewide that use this form, the second-most commonly used form of government in the state. The Township Committee is comprised of five members, who are elected directly by the voters at-large in partisan elections to serve three-year terms of office on a staggered basis, with either one or two seats coming up for election each year as part of the November general election in a three-year cycle. At a reorganization meeting, held each year within the first week of January, the Committee elects a Mayor and a Deputy Mayor for that year from among its members.

As of 2023, members of the Green Brook Township Committee are Mayor James Van Arsdale (R, term on committee ends December 31, 2024; term as mayor ends 2023), Deputy Mayor James Benscoter (R, term on committee ends and as deputy mayor ends 2023), Brian Conway (R, 2023), Gerard "Jerry" Searfoss (R, 2025) and Nancy Stoll (R, 2024).

=== Federal, state and county representation ===
Green Brook Township is located in the 7th Congressional District and is part of New Jersey's 21st state legislative district.

For the 119th United States Congress, New Jersey's 7th congressional district is represented by Thomas Kean Jr. (R, Westfield). New Jersey is represented in the United States Senate by Democrats Cory Booker (Newark, term ends 2027) and Andy Kim (Moorestown, term ends 2031).

For the 2026–2027 session, the 21st legislative district of the New Jersey Legislature is represented in the State Senate by Jon Bramnick (R, Westfield) and in the General Assembly by Vincent Kearney (D, Garwood) and Andrew Macurdy (D, Summit).

Somerset County is governed by a five-member Board of County Commissioners, whose members are elected at-large to three-year terms of office on a staggered basis, with one or two seats coming up for election each year. At an annual reorganization meeting held in the first week of January, the board selects a Director and deputy director from among its members. As of 2025, Somerset County's County Commissioners are Director Shanel Robinson (D, Franklin Township, term as commissioner ends 2027; term as director ends 2026), Deputy Director Paul Drake (D, Hillsborough Township, term as commissioner and as deputy director ends 2026), Melonie Marano (D, Green Brook Township, 2028), Elizabeth Graner (D, Bernards Township, 2026; elected to serve an unexpired term) and Sara Sooy (D, Bedminster Township, 2027).

Constitutional officers, elected on a countywide basis are Clerk Steve Peter (D, Somerville, 2027), Sheriff Darrin Russo (D, Franklin Township, 2028) and Surrogate Bernice "Tina" Jalloh (D, Franklin Township, 2030).

=== Politics ===
As of March 2011, there were a total of 4,545 registered voters in Green Brook Township, of which 920 (20.2% vs. 26.0% countywide) were registered as Democrats, 1,219 (26.8% vs. 25.7%) were registered as Republicans and 2,401 (52.8% vs. 48.2%) were registered as Unaffiliated. There were 5 voters registered as Libertarians or Greens. Among the township's 2010 Census population, 63.1% (vs. 60.4% in Somerset County) were registered to vote, including 85.7% of those ages 18 and over (vs. 80.4% countywide).

United States presidential election results for Green Brook Township
Year	Republican		Democratic		Third party(ies)	
Year	No.	%	No.	%	No.	%
2024	1,912	47.12%	2,031	50.05%	115	2.83%
2020	1,953	44.33%	2,396	54.38%	57	1.29%
2016	1,700	48.71%	1,648	47.22%	142	4.07%
2012	1,653	53.50%	1,394	45.11%	43	1.39%
2008	1,814	53.67%	1,532	45.33%	34	1.01%
2004	1,896	58.96%	1,290	40.11%	30	0.93%
2000	1,233	54.92%	933	41.56%	79	3.52%

In the 2012 presidential election, Republican Mitt Romney received 53.5% of the vote (1,653 cast), ahead of Democrat Barack Obama with 45.1% (1,394 votes), and other candidates with 1.4% (43 votes), among the 3,110 ballots cast by the township's 4,774 registered voters (20 ballots were spoiled), for a turnout of 65.1%. In the 2008 presidential election, Republican John McCain received 1,814 votes (53.1% vs. 46.1% countywide), ahead of Democrat Barack Obama with 1,532 votes (44.9% vs. 52.1%) and other candidates with 34 votes (1.0% vs. 1.1%), among the 3,415 ballots cast by the township's 4,470 registered voters, for a turnout of 76.4% (vs. 78.7% in Somerset County). In the 2004 presidential election, Republican George W. Bush received 1,896 votes (58.8% vs. 51.5% countywide), ahead of Democrat John Kerry with 1,290 votes (40.0% vs. 47.2%) and other candidates with 30 votes (0.9% vs. 0.9%), among the 3,225 ballots cast by the township's 3,910 registered voters, for a turnout of 82.5% (vs. 81.7% in the whole county).

Gubernatorial election results for Green Brook Township
Year	Republican		Democratic		Third party(ies)	
Year	No.	%	No.	%	No.	%
2025	1,409	45.87%	1,641	53.42%	22	0.72%
2021	1,453	53.28%	1,215	44.55%	59	2.16%
2017	1,066	54.39%	840	42.86%	54	2.76%
2013	1,341	71.25%	504	26.78%	37	1.97%
2009	1,548	64.53%	648	27.01%	203	8.46%
2005	1,273	60.08%	765	36.10%	81	3.82%

In the 2013 gubernatorial election, Republican Chris Christie received 71.3% of the vote (1,341 cast), ahead of Democrat Barbara Buono with 26.8% (504 votes), and other candidates with 2.0% (37 votes), among the 1,899 ballots cast by the township's 4,810 registered voters (17 ballots were spoiled), for a turnout of 39.5%. In the 2009 gubernatorial election, Republican Chris Christie received 1,548 votes (63.9% vs. 55.8% countywide), ahead of Democrat Jon Corzine with 648 votes (26.7% vs. 34.1%), Independent Chris Daggett with 182 votes (7.5% vs. 8.7%) and other candidates with 21 votes (0.9% vs. 0.7%), among the 2,424 ballots cast by the township's 4,527 registered voters, yielding a 53.5% turnout (vs. 52.5% in the county).

United States Senate election results for Green Brook Township1
Year	Republican		Democratic		Third party(ies)	
Year	No.	%	No.	%	No.	%
2024	1,846	47.31%	1,955	50.10%	101	2.59%
2018	1,522	51.63%	1,308	44.37%	118	4.00%
2012	1,559	53.21%	1,309	44.68%	62	2.12%
2006	1,177	57.25%	827	40.22%	52	2.53%

United States Senate election results for Green Brook Township2
Year	Republican		Democratic		Third party(ies)	
Year	No.	%	No.	%	No.	%
2020	2,107	47.54%	2,262	51.04%	63	1.42%
2014	864	55.63%	657	42.31%	32	2.06%
2013	687	58.27%	480	40.71%	12	1.02%
2008	1,752	55.48%	1,311	41.51%	95	3.01%

== Education ==
The Green Brook School District serves public school students in pre-kindergarten through eighth grade. As of the 2024–25 school year, the district, comprised of two schools, had an enrollment of 711 students and 74.5 classroom teachers (on an FTE basis), for a student–teacher ratio of 9.5:1. Schools in the district (with 2024-25 enrollment data from the National Center for Education Statistics) are Irene E. Feldkirchner Elementary School with 404 students in grades PreK-4 and Green Brook Middle School with 304 students in grades 5-8.

Green Brook's public school students in ninth through twelfth grades attend Watchung Hills Regional High School in Warren Township. Students from Green Brook and from the neighboring communities of Watchung, Warren Township (in Somerset County), and Long Hill Township (in Morris County) attend the school. As of the 2024–25 school year, the high school had an enrollment of 1,653 students and 142.8 classroom teachers (on an FTE basis), for a student–teacher ratio of 11.6:1.

== Transportation ==
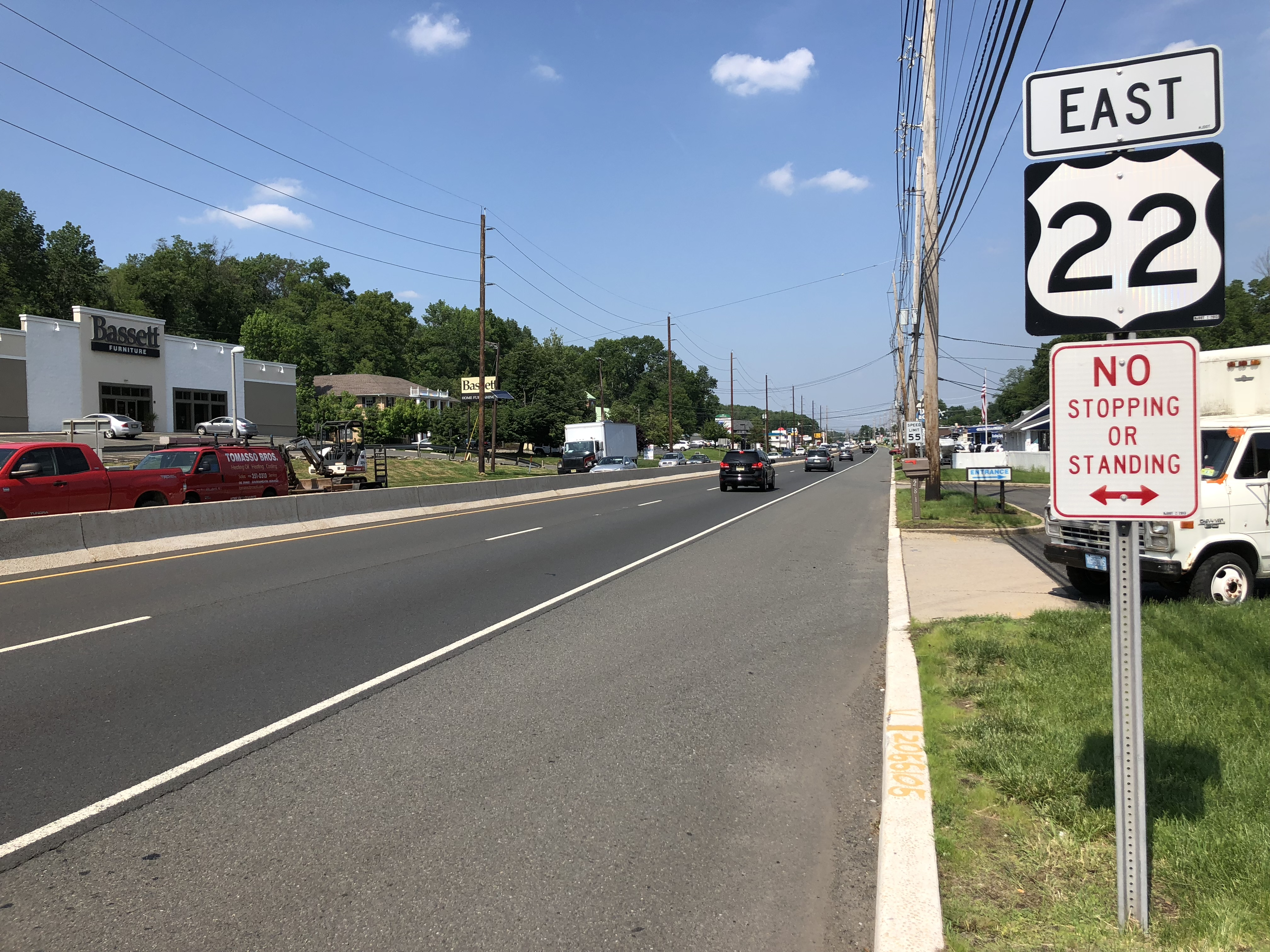
U.S. Route 22 in Green Brook

=== Roads and highways ===
As of May 2010, the township had a total of 36.19 miles (58.24 km) of roadways, of which 25.49 miles (41.02 km) were maintained by the municipality, 7.47 miles (12.02 km) by Somerset County and 3.23 miles (5.20 km) by the New Jersey Department of Transportation.

U.S. Route 22 is the most prominent highway directly serving Green Brook. County Route 527 and County Route 529 also pass through.

=== Public transportation ===
NJ Transit provides local bus service on the 822 route.

== Community organizations ==
There are several committees and organizations within the township of Green Brook. Green Brook has a Baptist church on Greenbrook Road. There is the Green Brook Seniors, which is held at the Senior Center. This is a place for all township seniors to meet and participate in different events. Green Brook also has a Lions Club, which volunteers for different causes. The Green Brook Recreation Committee is a volunteer organization that provides programs and event for all residents.

== Notable people ==
People who were born in, residents of, or otherwise closely associated with Green Brook Township include:

- Daphne Corboz (born 1993), professional soccer player who plays as a midfielder for Manchester City Women
- Mael Corboz (born 1994), professional soccer player who plays as a midfielder for SC Verl
- Rachel Corboz (born 1996), professional soccer player who plays as a midfielder for Stade de Reims
- Paul Crook (born 1966), lead guitarist for Meat Loaf, Anthrax and Sebastian Bach
- DJ Clark Kent (1966–2024, stage name of Antonio Franklin), hip hop record producer and DJ
- Mickey Gall (born 1992), professional mixed martial artist who competes in the welterweight division of the Ultimate Fighting Championship
- Gloria Gaynor (born 1949), Grammy award–winning singer best known for her song "I Will Survive"
- Sarai Gonzalez (born 2005), child actress
- Anna Moesch (born 2005), swimmer who set the American record in the 100-meter freestyle in 2026
- Josh Pauls (born 1992), gold medal winner in sled hockey at the 2010 Winter Paralympics in Vancouver
- Ed Stasium, record producer and audio engineer
