= Watchung Hills Regional High School =

High school in Somerset County, New Jersey, US

Watchung Hills Regional High School District

Address
- 108 Stirling Road Warren Township, Somerset County, New Jersey, 07059; United States
- Coordinates: 40.651839°N 74.477891°W

District information
- Grades: 9-12
- Superintendent: Elizabeth C. Jewett
- Business administrator: William Scholts
- Schools: 1

Students and staff
- Enrollment: 1,653 (as of 2024–25)
- Faculty: 142.8 FTEs
- Student–teacher ratio: 11.6:1

Other information
- District Factor Group: I
- Website: www.whrhs.org
Ind.	Per pupil	District spending	Rank (*)	9-12 average	%± vs. average
1A	Total Spending	$19,637	15	$18,891	3.9%
1	Budgetary Cost	14,517	14	15,592	−6.9%
2	Classroom Instruction	8,291	16	8,807	−5.9%
6	Support Services	1,780	8	2,294	−22.4%
8	Administrative Cost	1,823	35	1,592	14.5%
10	Operations & Maintenance	1,874	20	1,954	−4.1%
13	Extracurricular Activities	725	15	873	−17.0%
16	Median Teacher Salary	67,840	25	71,726
Data from NJDoE 2014 Taxpayers' Guide to Education Spending. *Of 9-12 districts with any number of students. Lowest spending=1; Highest=47

Watchung Hills Regional High School

Information
- Type: Public high school
- Motto: Encourage, Empower, Explore, Excel.
- Established: September 1957
- NCES School ID: 341722005320
- Principal: William J. Librera
- Faculty: 142.8 FTEs
- Grades: 9-12
- Enrollment: 1,653 (as of 2024–25)
- Student to teacher ratio: 11.6:1
- Campus: 85 acres (340,000 m^{2})
- Colors: Brown and Gold
- Athletics: 29 varsity sports
- Athletics conference: Skyland Conference (general); Big Central Football Conference (football)
- Team name: Warriors
- Publication: Folio (arts magazine)
- Newspaper: Student News

Watchung Hills Regional High School is a regional comprehensive public high school and school district serving students in portions of Somerset and Morris Counties in the U.S. state of New Jersey. Students from Warren Township and from the neighboring communities of Watchung, and Green Brook (through sending/receiving relationship) in Somerset County and Long Hill Township in Morris County attend the school. The high school is located in Warren Township on Stirling Road and is the only facility of the Watchung Hills Regional High School District.

As of the 2024–25 school year, the school had an enrollment of 1,653 students and 142.8 classroom teachers (on an FTE basis), for a student–teacher ratio of 11.6:1. There were 46 students (2.8% of enrollment) eligible for free lunch and 10 (0.6% of students) eligible for reduced-cost lunch.

== History ==
Constructed using $1,650,000 in bond funding (equivalent to $18.9 million in 2025), the school included 38 classrooms designed to handle an enrollment of 750 students on a site in Warren Township covering 39 acres (16 ha). The school opened in September 1957 with 615 students in attendance. Prior to the opening of the regional school, students from Warren Township and Watchung had attended an increasingly overcrowded North Plainfield High School, while students from Long Hill Township attended Bernards High School in Bernardsville on an interim basis, after a previous relationship with Morristown High School had been ended.

Green Brook started a sending/receiving relationship with Watchung Hills Regional High School in 1990 after the town decided to close its high school due to declining enrollment.

In 2016, an episode of Dance Moms, Season 5, Episode 3 entitled "JoJo with a Bow Bow", was filmed at the school. The school hosted the In10sity Dance Invitational on October 25, 2014, which was the subject of the episode.

On November 5, 2019, the school's superintendent announced the condemnation of a photograph involving two students in blackface during an off-campus Halloween party, declaring that "hate has no place on our campus".

In 2020, it was revealed that students from the school's special education program had been omitted from the 2020 yearbook.

In 2021, the school announced that it would retain its Warriors team name, but updated its logo and branding to remove any images of Native American symbols and to help represent unity in the district. The retired logo had featured a Native American headdress.

In 2022, the day after the Robb Elementary School shooting, the school entered a lockdown after a false active shooter threat was made.

The district had been classified by the New Jersey Department of Education as being in District Factor Group "I", the second-highest of eight groupings. District Factor Groups organize districts statewide to allow comparison by common socioeconomic characteristics of the local districts. From lowest socioeconomic status to highest, the categories are A, B, CD, DE, FG, GH, I and J.

== Awards, recognition and rankings ==
Watchung Hills Regional High School received the National Blue Ribbon Award of Excellence from the United States Department of Education in 1994-95, the highest honor that an American school can achieve.

In 2021, Watchung Hills Regional High School was awarded the New Jersey Lighthouse award for its work towards Equity - specifically efforts toward recruiting and retaining a diverse staff.

In its listing of "America's Best High Schools 2016", the school was ranked 131st out of 500 best high schools in the country; it was ranked 24th among all high schools in New Jersey and 11th among the state's non-magnet schools.

In its 2013 report on "America's Best High Schools", The Daily Beast ranked the school 514th in the nation among participating public high schools and 42nd among schools in New Jersey.

In the 2011 "Ranking America's High Schools" issue by The Washington Post, the school was ranked 34th in New Jersey and 1,160th nationwide. In 2008, Newsweek ranked the school as 919th in the nation. In Newsweek's May 22, 2007 issue, ranking the country's top high schools, Watchung Hills High School was listed in 999th place, the 31st-highest ranked school in New Jersey. In the magazine's 2006 survey, the school was ranked as 745th nationwide. In their 2004 survey, Newsweek ranked WHRHS as the 583rd best high school in the nation.

The school was the 50th-ranked public high school in New Jersey out of 339 schools statewide in New Jersey Monthly magazine's September 2014 cover story on the state's "Top Public High Schools", using a new ranking methodology. The school had been ranked 44th in the state of 328 schools in 2012, after being ranked 48th in 2010 out of 322 schools listed. The magazine ranked the school 49th in 2008 out of 316 schools. The school was ranked 38th in the magazine's September 2006 issue, which included 316 schools across the state. Schooldigger.com ranked the school 96th out of 381 public high schools statewide in its 2011 rankings (a decrease of 276 positions from the 2010 ranking) which were based on the combined percentage of students classified as proficient or above proficient on the mathematics (86.0%) and language arts literacy (97.6%) components of the High School Proficiency Assessment (HSPA).

In 2022, U.S. News & World Report ranked the school 107th of the 445 high schools in New Jersey and 2,643rd in the country, with 54% of students participating in Advanced Placement exams.

== Athletics ==
The Watchung Hills Regional High School Warriors compete in the Skyland Conference, which is comprised of public and private high schools in Hunterdon, Somerset and Warren counties and operates under the auspices of the New Jersey State Interscholastic Athletic Association (NJSIAA). With 1,469 students in grades 10-12, the school was classified by the NJSIAA for the 2019–20 school year as Group IV for most athletic competition purposes, which included schools with an enrollment of 1,060 to 5,049 students in that grade range. The football team competes in Division 5A of the Big Central Football Conference, which includes 60 public and private high schools in Hunterdon, Middlesex, Somerset, Union and Warren counties, which are broken down into 10 divisions by size and location. The school was classified by the NJSIAA as Group IV North for football for 2024–2026, which included schools with 893 to 1,315 students.

The school's interscholastic sports team separated into three seasons include:

- Fall - cheerleading, cross country (boys and girls), field hockey, football, gymnastics, soccer (boys and girls), tennis (girls) and volleyball (girls)
- Winter - basketball (boys and girls), bowling, cheerleading, fencing, ice hockey, swimming, track and field indoor and wrestling
- Spring - baseball, golf (boys and girls), lacrosse (boys and girls), tennis (boys), track and field outdoor, ultimate frisbee, softball and volleyball (boys)

The men's cross country team won the 1974 Group IV state championship. This was the first WHRHS team to have won a state championship.

The girls' tennis team won the Group IV state championship in 1976 and 1978 (vs. Ridgewood High School both years), 1981 (vs. Cherry Hill East High School), and won the Group III state championship in 1982 (vs. Millburn High School), 1983, 1985 (vs. Mainland Regional High School), 2000 (vs. Tenafly High School) and 2001 (vs. Northern Highlands Regional High School). The team won the Tournament of Champions in 1981 (vs. Rumson-Fair Haven Regional High School), 1982 and 1983 (vs. Red Bank Catholic High School both years). The eight group titles are tied for seventh-most in the state and the three Tournament of Champions titles are tied for third most. The team finished 21-0 in 1976 after defeating Ridgewood 3-2 in come-from-behind fashion in the playoff finals.

The girls swimming team won the Division B state championship in 1985-1987, 1989 and 1992.

The baseball team won the 2005 North II, Group IV state sectional championship with an 11-0 win over Hunterdon Central Regional High School. The team has won the Somerset County Tournament in 1975, 1982, 1983, 1993 and 2009; the program's five titles (through 2018) are the fourth-most in the tournament's history since it was established in 1973.

The ice hockey team won the Monsignor Kelly Cup in 2005. The team made it to the NJSIAA Public A State Finals vs. Ridge High School in 2008, falling by a score of 5-0; the most successful season for the six-year-old program.

The girls' softball team won the Group IV state championships in 2016, defeating Egg Harbor Township High School by a score of 4-0 in the tournament final. The girls' softball team won the Group IV state championships in 2022, a rematch of the 2016 championship, with a 2-1 defeat of Egg Harbor Township High School in the final game of the tournament.

The boys' lacrosse team had their most successful season in 2018. They finished the season with a 20-3 record, in which two of those losses came in overtime, and their final loss came in the semifinals of the Tournament of Champions to the eventual winner, Delbarton. They made it to the county final, won the program’s first ever North Group IV sectional championship and won the Group IV state title, with a 10-3win against Lenape High School in the championship game. Head Coach Jamie Lovejoy won NJ.com Coach of the Year and four players earned U.S. All-American honors (two of those players being Academic All-Americans), with five players going on to play college lacrosse. They were ranked fifth in the state of New Jersey by NJ.com and the 18th team in the country by MaxPreps.

The girls spring track team was Group IV co-champion in 2018.

The boys' wrestling team won the North II Group V state sectional champion in 2018-2020. The school has had four state champions: Michael Gatti (2003), Alex Caruso (2006), Brendan Ard (2008 and 2009) and Michael Magaldo (2012).

The fencing team was the sabre team winner in 2020.

In 2022, the men's track team won the county title for the first time since 1966.

== Co-curricular ==
Clubs are categorized as Academic, Academic-Honor Societies, Academic-Diversified Interest, Diversified Interest, Student Government, Performing Arts, Public Service, Social Justice, and Recreation. The school also offers an innovative academy program that allows students to specialize in a particular area of interest.

The district acknowledges the following co-curricular organizations. Each organization requires an advisor, a constitution and board of education recognition.

=== Co-curricular awards and achievements ===
In 2022, the robotics team qualified for the World Championships in Houston, making it to the semi-finals of the Roebling Division.

==== Academic ====
- Academic Team
- Chemistry Olympiad
- Cyber Security
- Math League
- Robotics Team
- Science Bowl Club
- Science League

==== Academic - Honor Societies ====
- National Art Honor Society
- National Honor Society
- Tri-M Music Honor Society
- Waksman Molecular Biology

==== Academic - Diversified Interest ====
- Astronomy Club
- Creative Writing Club
- DECA Club
- Economics Club
- Entrepreneurship Club
- Future Problem Solving Program International (FPSPI)
- Film Club
- Folio
- Forensics and Investigatory Club (F.I.C)
- Future Business Leaders of America
- Investment and Finance
- Future Doctors of America
- Kiva Microfiance
- Neuroscience Club
- Photography Club
- School Newspaper
- Video Game Programming
- Yearbook

==== Diversified interest ====
- American Sign Language Club
- Art Club
- Asian Culture Club
- Chess Club
- Culinary Club
- Computer Science Club
- Fandom Club
- Linguistics
- Philosophy Club
- Sports Analytics Club
- Sports Fans Club
- Tabletop Gaming Club

==== Student government ====
- All School Council
- Freshman Grade Level Council
- Sophomore Grade Level Council
- Junior Grade Level Council
- Senior Grade Level Council

==== Performing Arts ====
- Jazz Band
- Marching Warriors
- Script & Cue

==== Public Service ====
- Action Against Hunger
- ALS Alliance
- B.E.L.I.E.V. Club
- CARE Club
- Diversity Club
- Environmental Club
- H2O For Life
- INTERACT Community Service Club
- Peer Leadership Program
- Red Cross Club

==== Social Justice ====
- Black Student Union
- Gender and Sexuality Alliance (GSA)
- GLOW Club
- Junior State of America
- Mock Trial
- Model United Nations
- Speech and Debate
- Young Democrats
- Young Republicans
- LatinX Alliance Club

==== Recreation ====
- Archery
- Ping Pong/Badminton Club

== Administration ==
Core members of the school administration are:

- Dr. Elizabeth Jewett, superintendent
- William Scholts, business administrator and board secretary
- Dr. William J. Librera, principal (with three vice principals)

== Board of education ==
The district's board of education, comprised of nine members, sets policy and oversees the fiscal and educational operation of the district through its administration. As a Type II school district, the board's trustees are elected directly by voters to serve three-year terms of office on a staggered basis, with three seats up for election each year held (since 2012) as part of the November general election. The board appoints a superintendent to oversee the district's day-to-day operations and a business administrator to supervise the business functions of the district. The seats on the board are allocated based on the population of the constituent districts. Of the nine elected seats, five are allocated to Warren Township, two to Long Hill Township and two to Watchung; One seat is appointed for a one-year term by the Green Brook School District.

As of 2022, the board members are:

Name	Position	Town
Rober Morrison	President	Warren
Susan Ober	Vice President	Long Hill
Rita Barone	Member	Long Hill
Michael Birnberg	Member	Watchung
Naresh Chand	Member	Warren
Peter Fallon	Member	Warren
Daniel Gallic	Member	Warren
Catherine Lehigh	Member	Watchung
Janine Potter	Member	Green Brook
Carol Prasa	Member	Long Hill

== Notable alumni ==
- Billy Ard (born 1959), former professional football guard who played in the NFL for the New York Giants
- Scott Braun (class of 2007), studio host and reporter for MLB Network and NHL Network
- Ken Brenn Jr. (1952–2019), modified racing driver who won more than 100 feature events at venues in the Mid-Atlantic states
- Daphne Corboz (born 1993), professional soccer player who plays for the France women's national football team
- Monica Crowley (born 1968, class of 1986), former United States Assistant Secretary of the Treasury for Public Affairs and former Fox News political commentator
- Daniel Edelman (born 2003), professional soccer player who plays as a midfielder for New York Red Bulls
- Mickey Gall (born 1992), UFC fighter who was captain of the Watchung Hills football team
- Tom Glassic (born 1954), retired NFL offensive lineman who played for the Denver Broncos
- Robert Hovanec (born 1993), sprinter who competed in the 400 metres event
- Chris Kratt (born 1969) and Martin Kratt (born 1965), hosts of Wild Kratts, Kratts' Creatures and Zoboomafoo as well as Be the Creature, which runs on the National Geographic Channel
- Anna Moesch (born 2005), swimmer who set the American record in the 100-meter freestyle in 2026
- David Palmer, former lead vocalist with Steely Dan
- Josh Pauls (born 1992), sled hockey player who won a gold medal at the 2010 Winter Paralympics in Vancouver
- Laura Prepon (born 1980), actress best known for her work on That '70s Show and Orange Is the New Black; she transferred out of the school at age 15
- Allison Reed (born 1994), Olympic ice skater for the Republic of Georgia who competed in the 2010 Vancouver Games
- Adam Riess (born 1969, class of 1988), winner of the 2011 Nobel Prize in Physics
- Jonah Rindner (born 1997, class of 2016), singer, rapper and multi-instrumentalist who performs as Dolo Tonight
- Keith Sims (born 1967, class of 1985), former professional football offensive lineman who played in the NFL for the Miami Dolphins and Washington Redskins
- Alison Wright (born 1961), photojournalist and author
