= James Maxime DuPont =

- Born: April 30, 1912; Edinburgh, Scotland
- Died: July 1, 1997 (aged 85); Watchung, New Jersey, U.S.

James Maxime DuPont (Edinburgh, Scotland, April 30, 1912 — Watchung, New Jersey, United States, July 1, 1991) was an American meteorite collector.

His father was Jean Rene Claudius Dupont, an analytical chemist. At the time of his death, he was known for having the largest private collection of meteorites in the world, and after his death they were donated to the Planetary Studies Foundation, where they were known as the "James M. DuPont Meteorite Collection". The impressive collection was gathered over thirty years while containing 1,719 individual meteorites, with a total mass over 500 kilograms. These included several which were somewhat controversial and unrecognized, along with a few others that represented new finds awaiting classification. The Planetary Studies Foundation then donated them to the Field Museum of Natural History, the combined collection having had more than 1,700 meteors and an estimated value of $3 million, creating the world's largest non government meteorite collection.

As a resident of Watchung, New Jersey, DuPont founded an industrial thermoplastics company.
