= Keith Sims =

American football player (born 1967)

Seckinger Jaguars
- Title: Offensive line coach

Personal information
- Born: June 17, 1967 (age 59); Baltimore, Maryland, U.S.
- Listed height: 6 ft 3 in (1.91 m)
- Listed weight: 318 lb (144 kg)

Career information
- High school: Watchung Hills Regional (Warren Township, New Jersey)
- College: Iowa State
- NFL draft: 1990: 2nd round, 39th overall pick

Career history

Playing
- Miami Dolphins (1990–1997); Washington Redskins (1997); Philadelphia Eagles (1998)*; Washington Redskins (1998–2000)
- * Offseason or practice squad member only

Coaching
- Seckinger Jaguars (2022–present) Offensive line coach

Awards and highlights
- Second-team All-Pro (1994); 3× Pro Bowl (1993–1995); PFWA All-Rookie Team (1990); Dolphins Walk of Fame (2013); Second-team All-Big Eight (1989)

Career NFL statistics
- Games played: 142
- Games started: 133
- Fumble recoveries: 6
- Stats at Pro Football Reference

Keith Alexander Sims (born June 17, 1967) is an American former professional football player who was an offensive lineman for 11 seasons in the National Football League (NFL) from 1990 to 2000, playing for the Miami Dolphins and Washington Redskins. He played college football for the Iowa State Cyclones and selected by the Miami Dolphins in the second round of the 1990 NFL draft. Sims and Richmond Webb were leaders on a dominant Miami offensive line in the mid-1990s. Sims was elected to the Pro Bowl three times, in 1993, 1994 and 1995. He also played for the Washington Redskins. The jersey number he wore was 69.

== Early life ==
Sims grew up in the Millington section of Long Hill Township, New Jersey, and played high school football at Watchung Hills Regional High School. He was inducted into his high school hall of fame in 2009.

== College career ==
After high school, played college football for the Iowa State Cyclones. He graduated from ISU in 1990 and was elected into the Iowa State Hall of Fame in 2006.

== Coaching career ==
On April 23, 2022, Sims was hired by the Seckinger Jaguars.

== Personal life ==
He is married to Tia, with whom he has three children, Keith Jr., Jayson, and Justin. He also has two children from a previous marriage, to Cam named Cairo and Storm. He does sideline reporting for the Miami Dolphins Radio Network with play-by-play man Jimmy Cefalo and color commentators Joe Rose and Jason Taylor.
