= Alison Wright (photojournalist) =

American journalist

Alison Wright (died 23 March 2022) was a documentary photographer, author and public speaker. Wright travelled the globe documenting endangered cultures, people and issues concerning the human condition. She twice received a Lowell Thomas Travel Journalism Award from the Society of American Travel Writers and became a Dorothea Lange Fellow in Documentary Photography at the University of California, Berkeley in 1993.

In January 2000, Wright was nearly killed in an accident in Laos, when the bus she was riding was hit by a logging truck. Her story of survival has been featured in Outside magazine, National Geographic Adventure, and Yoga Journal, and is documented in her memoir, Learning to Breathe: One Woman's Journey of Spirit and Survival.

After graduating from Watchung Hills Regional High School, Wright studied photojournalism as an undergraduate at Syracuse University and received a master's degree in Visual Anthropology from the University of California at Berkeley.

Alison was diving in the Azores and had a cardiac episode in March 2022. After a week in a coma she died on 23 March 2022.

== Bibliography ==
- Human Tribe, a photo book of global portraits (2017)
- Face to Face: Portraits of the Human Spirit (2013)
- Learning to Breathe: One Woman's Journey of Spirit and Survival (2009)
- Faces of Hope: Children of a Changing World (2003)
- A Simple Monk: Writings on the Dalai Lama (2001)
- The Spirit of Tibet, Portrait of a Culture in Exile (1998)
