= Washington Rock State Park =

State park in Somerset County, New Jersey

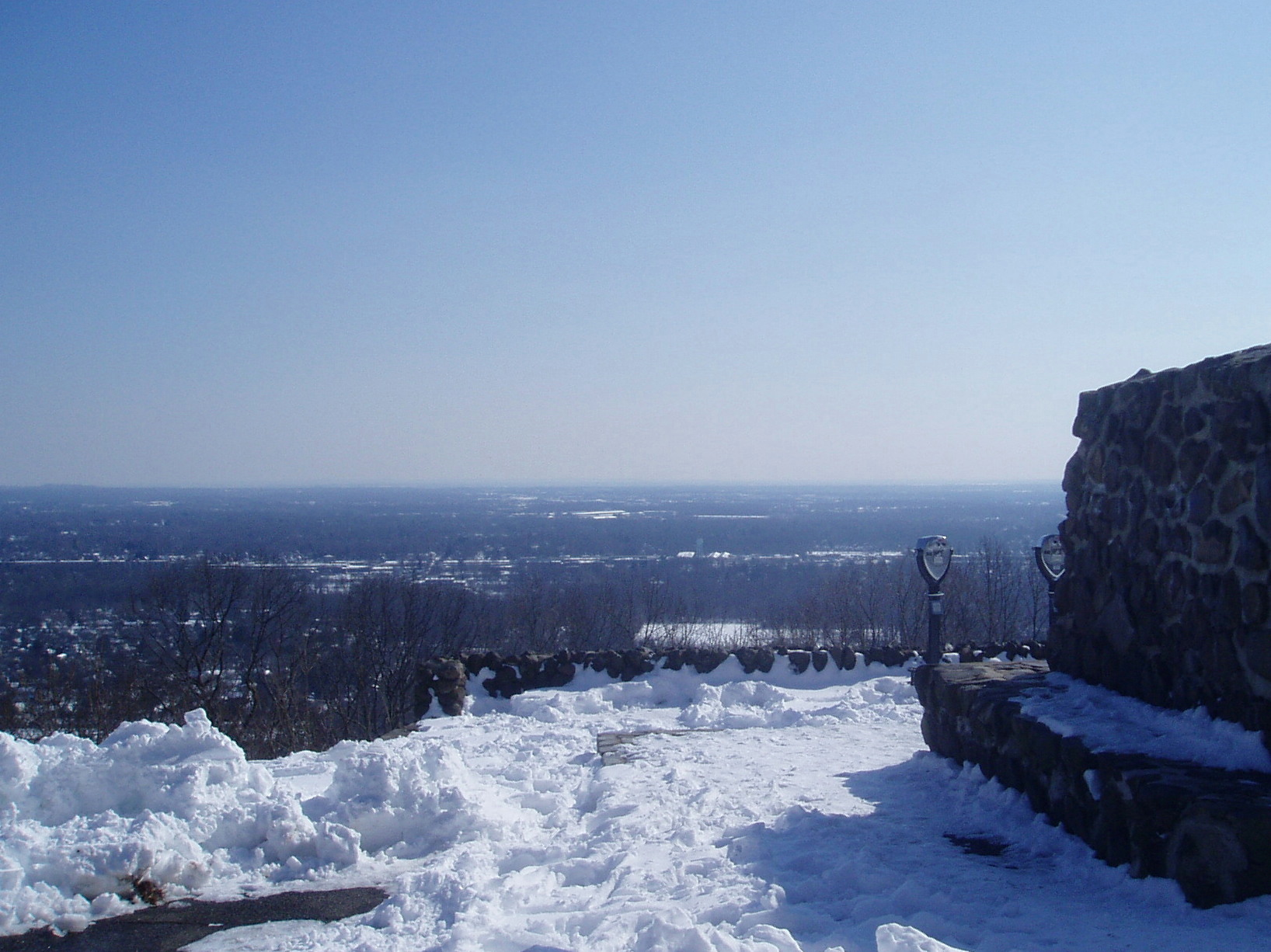
- Washington Rock State Park vista

- Location within Somerset County, New Jersey Location within New Jersey Location within the United States
- Location: Green Brook, New Jersey
- Coordinates: 40°36′48″N 74°28′24″W
- Area: 52-acre (0.21 km^{2})
- Opened: 1932
- Operator: New Jersey Division of Parks and Forestry
- Website: Official website

Washington Rock State Park is a 52-acre (0.21 km^{2}) scenic state park on top of the first Watchung Mountain in Green Brook, New Jersey. The park is operated and maintained by the New Jersey Division of Parks and Forestry.

It is famous for its scenic overlook used by General George Washington in 1777 to monitor troops led by British General William Howe. The 30-mile (48 km) panoramic vista covers the eastern plains of New Jersey up to New York City. The Washington Rock vista stands at an elevation of 164 m (538 ft) a.s.l.

The land was bought in 1913 to establish the park and commemorate the events of 1777. Most of it is woodland but at the outlook there are walking trails and a picnic area.

== Gallery ==
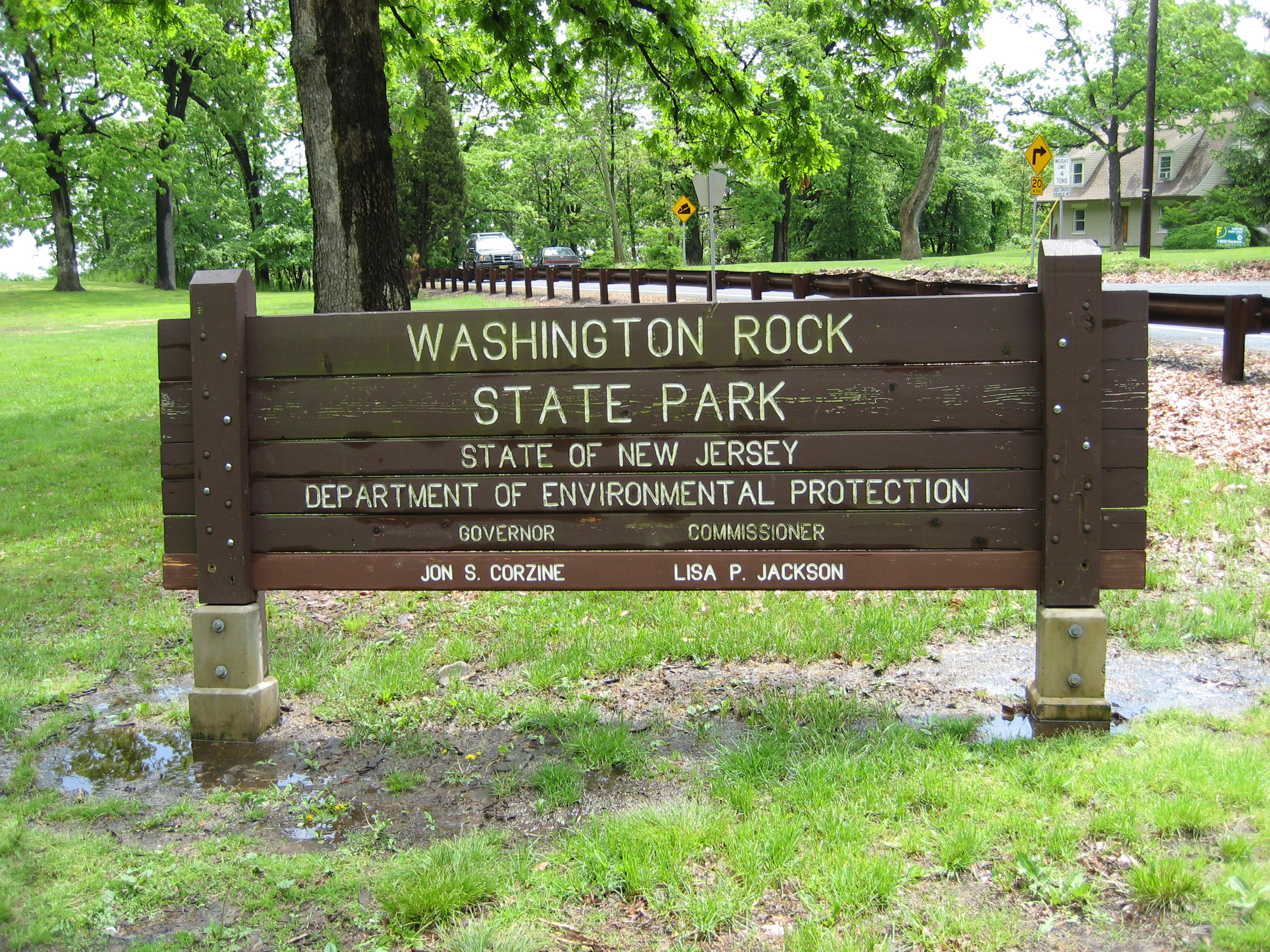
Park sign

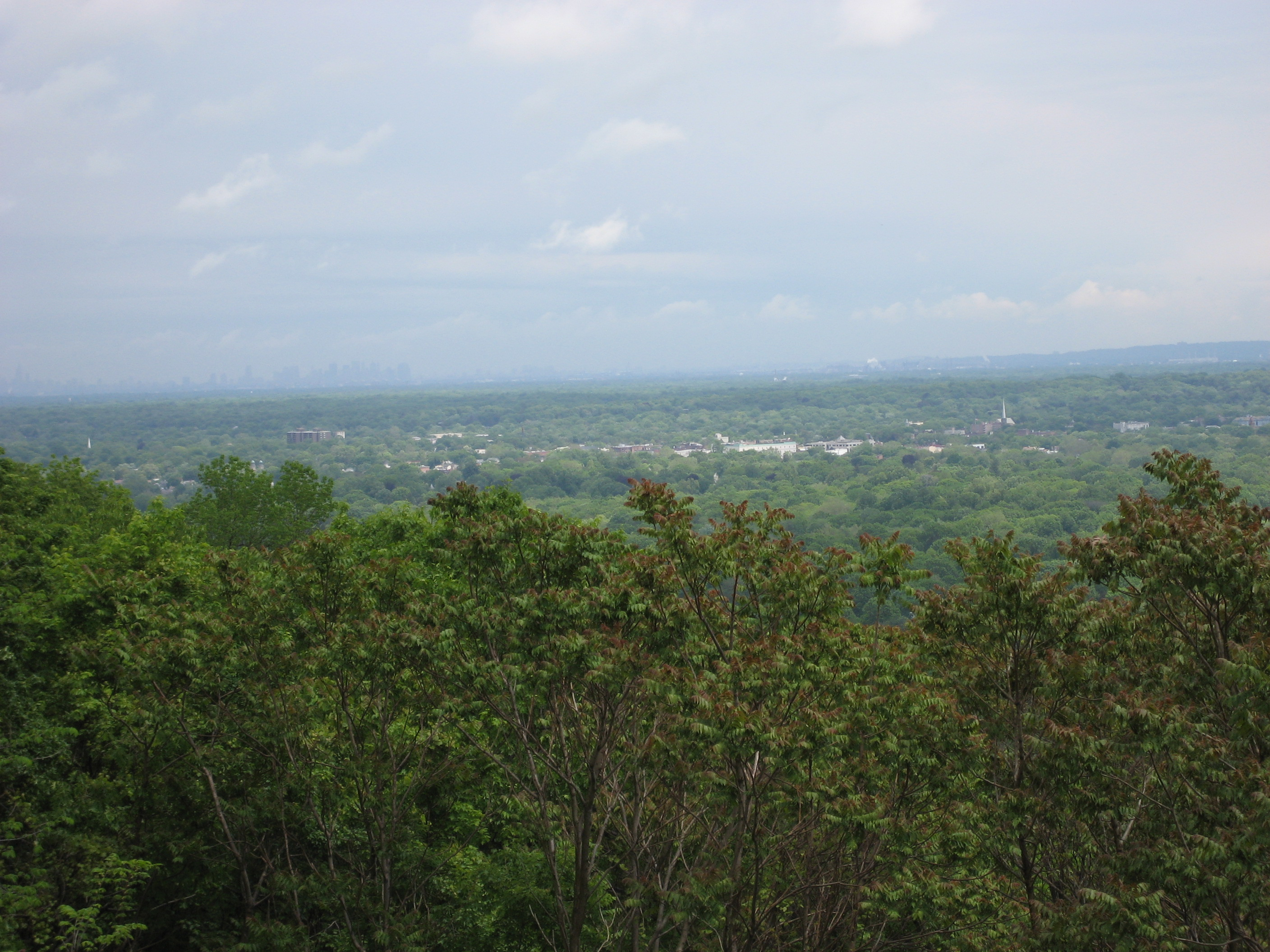
Another view

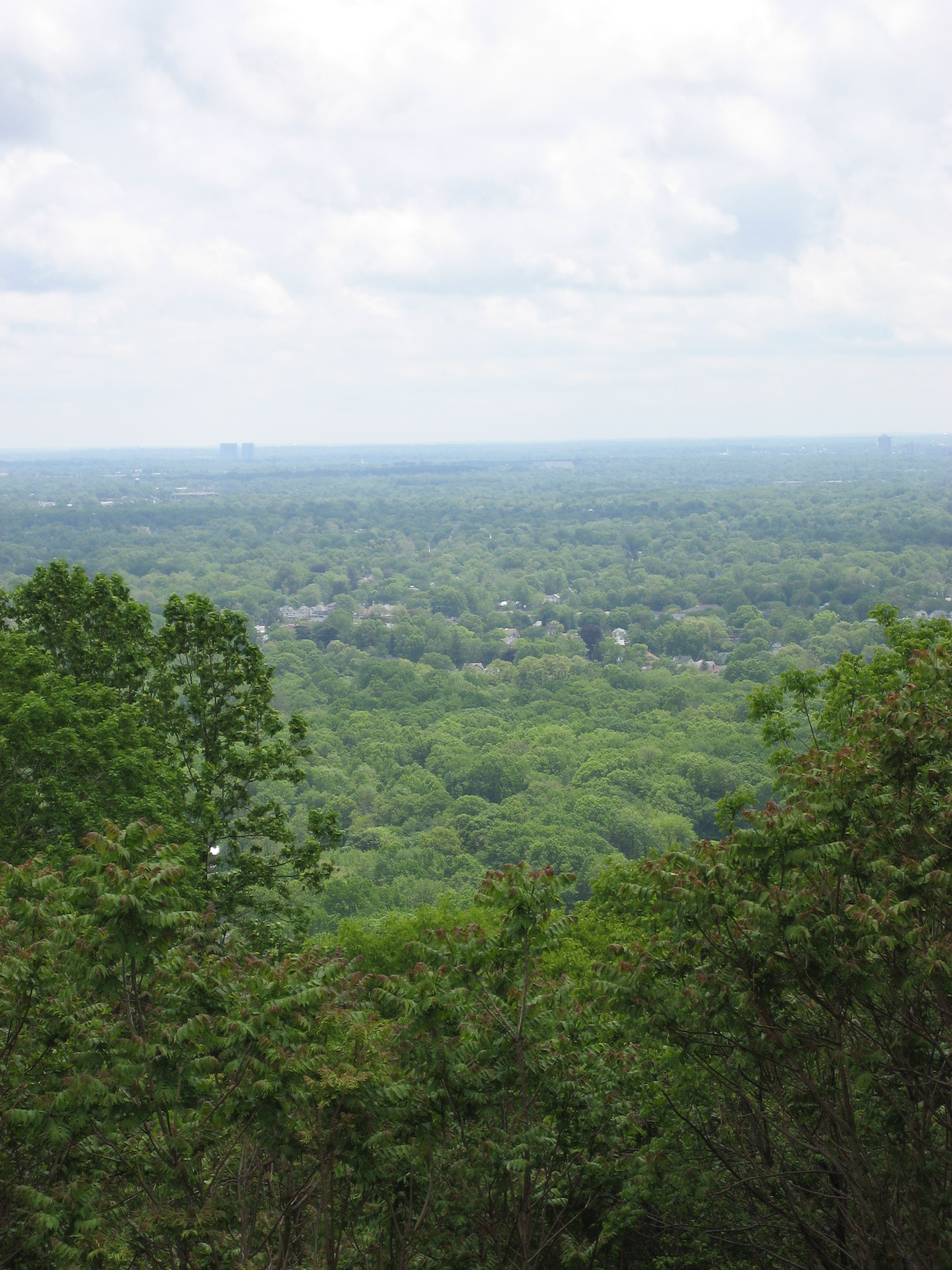
Another view

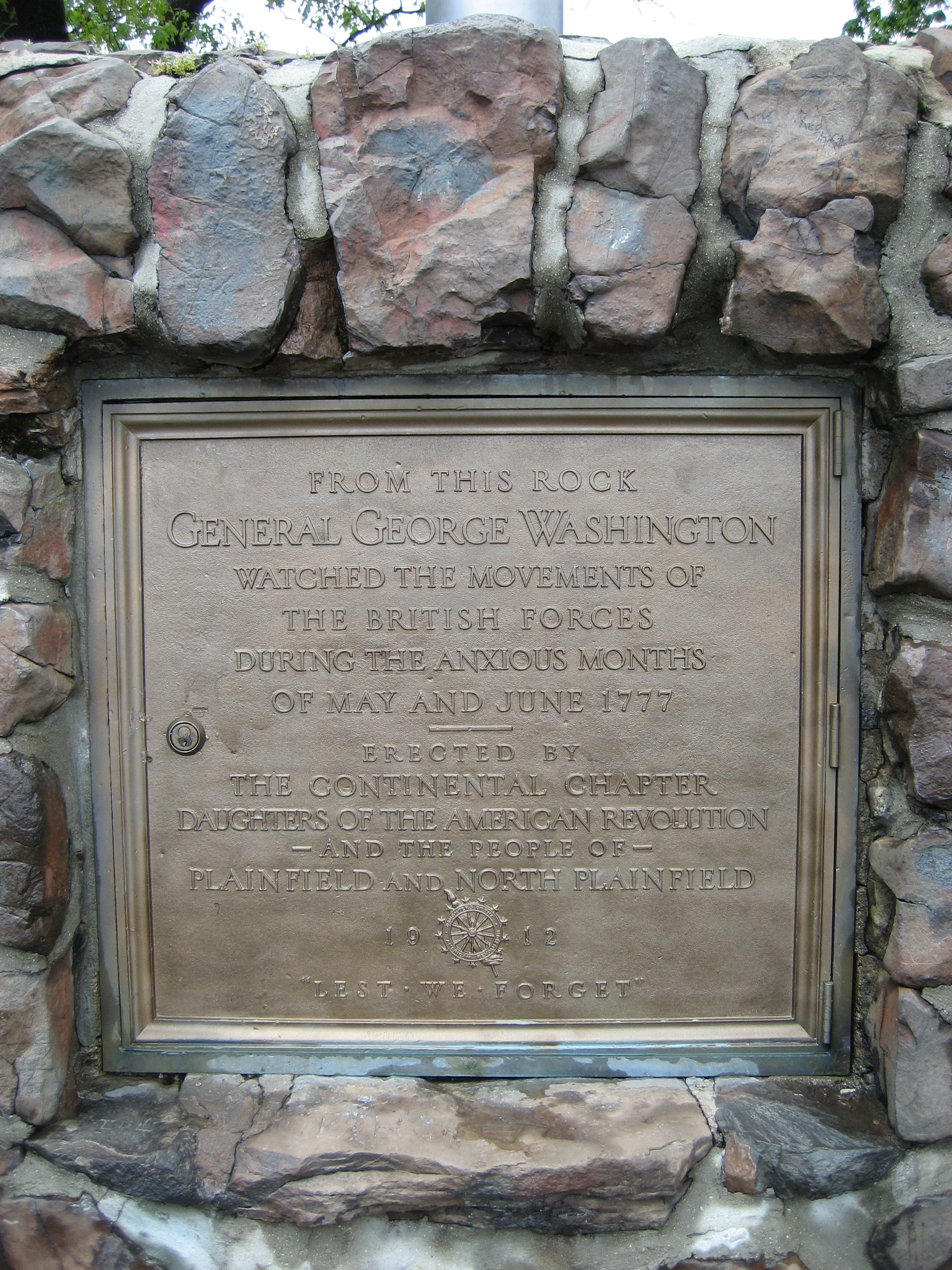
Commemorative plaque

== See also ==
- List of New Jersey state parks
