= Watchung, New Jersey =

Borough in Somerset County, New Jersey, US

- Borough
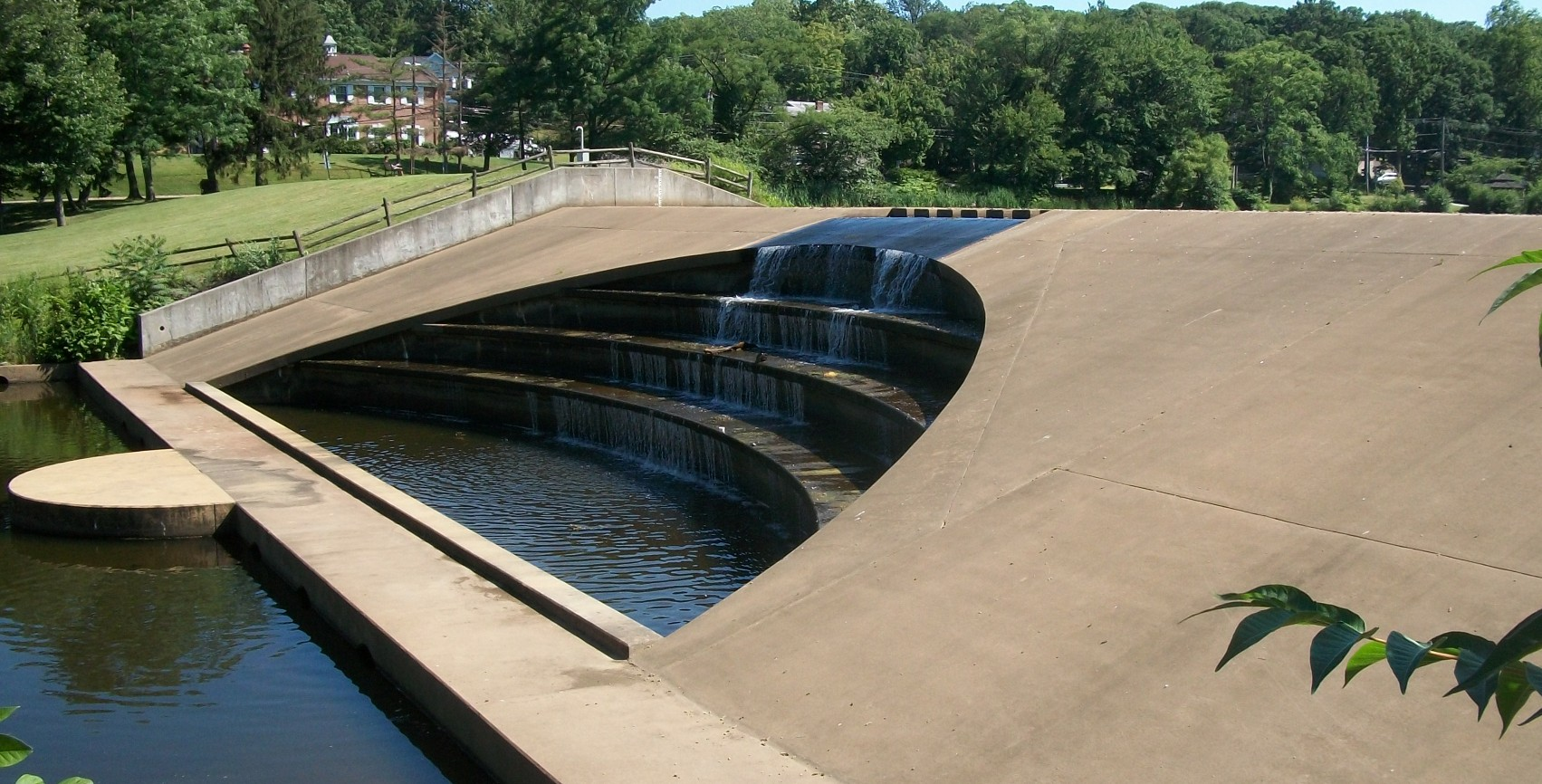
- Cascading dam holds in Watchung Lake

- Seal

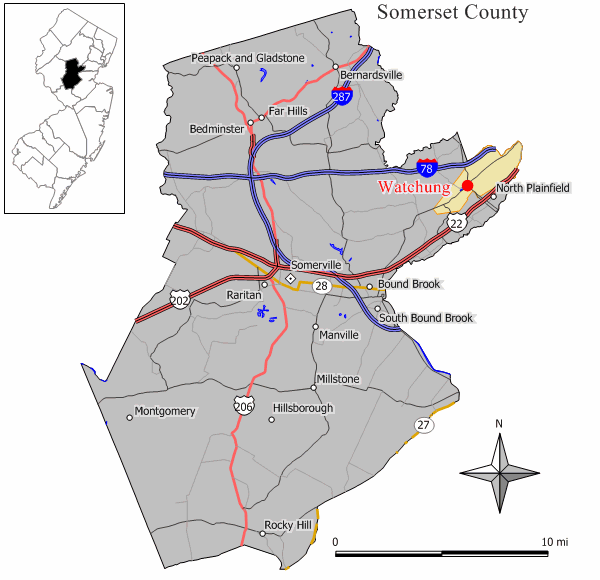
- Location of Watchung in Somerset County highlighted in yellow (right). Inset map: Location of Somerset County in New Jersey highlighted in black (left).

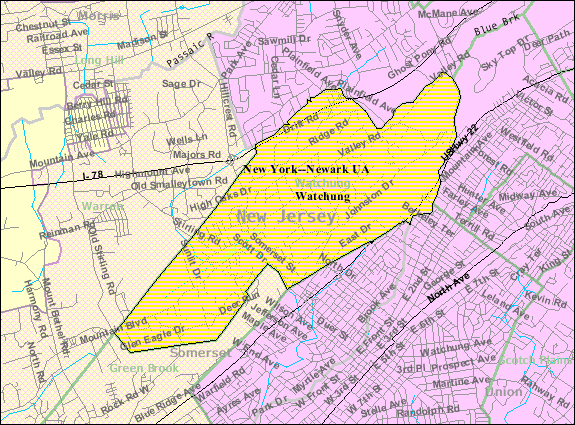
- Census Bureau map of Watchung, New Jersey
- Interactive map of Watchung, New Jersey
- Location in Somerset County Location in New Jersey Location in the United States
- Coordinates: 40.642845°N 74.436233°W
- Country: United States
- State: New Jersey
- County: Somerset
- Incorporated: April 20, 1926

Government
  - Type: Borough
  - Body: Borough Council
  - Mayor: Ronald Jubin (R, term ends December 31, 2026)
  - Administrator: James J. Damato
  - Municipal clerk: Edith G. Gil

Area
  - Total: 6.04 sq mi (15.65 km^{2})
  - Land: 6.02 sq mi (15.58 km^{2})
  - Water: 0.027 sq mi (0.07 km^{2}) 0.46%
  - Rank: 256th of 565 in state 10th of 21 in county
- Elevation: 259 ft (79 m)

Population (2020)
  - Total: 6,449
  - Estimate (2023): 6,434
  - Rank: 330th of 565 in state 16th of 21 in county
  - Density: 1,072/sq mi (414/km^{2})
  - Rank: 374th of 565 in state 12th of 21 in county
- Time zone: UTC−05:00 (Eastern (EST))
  - Summer (DST): UTC−04:00 (Eastern (EDT))
- ZIP Code: 07069
- Area code: 908
- FIPS code: 3403577600
- GNIS feature ID: 0885433
- Website: www.watchungnj.gov

Watchung (/wɑːˈtʃʌŋ/) is a borough in Somerset County, in the U.S. state of New Jersey, located approximately 29 miles (47 km) west of New York City. As of the 2020 United States census, the borough's population was 6,449, an increase of 648 (+11.2%) from the 2010 census count of 5,801, which in turn reflected an increase of 188 (+3.3%) from the 5,613 counted in the 2000 census. It is located within the Raritan Valley region.

Watchung was incorporated as a borough by an act of the New Jersey Legislature on May 23, 1926, from portions of North Plainfield Township (now Green Brook Township) based on the results of a referendum held on April 20, 1926. The name "Watchung" comes from the Lenni Lenape Native Americans, meaning "high hills" or from "watschu," meaning "hill."

In 2012, Forbes.com listed Watchung as 384th in its listing of "America's Most Expensive ZIP Codes", with a median home price of $767,507.

The borough is one of the state's highest-income communities. Based on data from the American Community Survey (ACS) for 2014–2018, Watchung residents had a median household income of $153,341, almost double the statewide median of $79,363.

== History ==
George Washington surveyed the British troops in Perth Amboy, 20 miles away, from the first ridge of the Watchung Mountains. The eastern edge of these ridges reaches to the Oranges in the direction of Newark. The name "Washingtonville" was used in early times, but was rejected as the name for the area by the United States Postal Service, which felt that the state already had too many places named Washington.

Watchung, in the 1900s was a semi-rural small community of about 3,200 people in comparison with the relatively larger and more urban communities of Plainfield and Somerville. The first mayor of the town was Henry Baldwin Macdonald, who served from 1926 to 1928. The 1967 Plainfield riots, caused an exodus of the large upper-middle class population from the nearby cities to the Watchung Hills area to communities such as Watchung, Warren Township and Bridgewater Township.

Watchung was incorporated as a borough by an act of the New Jersey Legislature on May 23, 1926, from portions of North Plainfield Township (now Green Brook Township) based on the results of a referendum held on April 20, 1926.

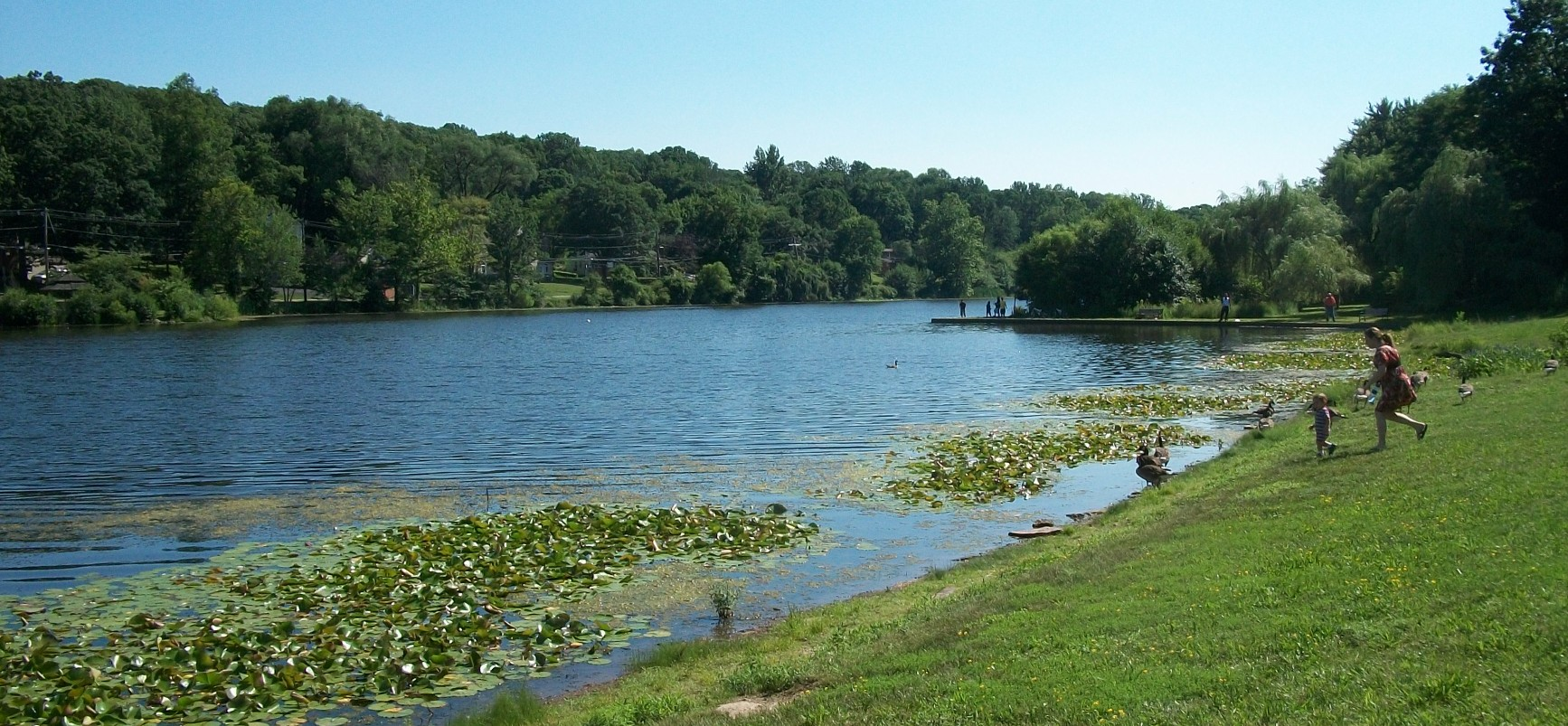
Fishing is allowed at Watchung Lake on a catch-and-release basis only.

In the wake of public fear that ensued after the 1938 radio broadcast of Orson Welles' The War of the Worlds, National Guard troops were stationed around the hills in Watchung, as told on the vinyl record recording of news reports of the day.

Notable figures who have lived in Watchung include Bobby Thomson, Billy Ard and Carl Banks.

=== Historic places ===
Eaton House is a Watchung historic site that was owned by congressman Charles Aubrey Eaton and has been the residence of other notables over the years. Known also as the Sunbright Farm farmhouse, the home was damaged in April 2014 when it was hit by trees that fell as a result of a likely microburst in a severe storm that rolled through the area.

The borough is home to Watchung Valley Golf Club, which moved from its original nine-hole course in North Plainfield to its current location on Mountain Boulevard in 1927. The club was known as the Twin Brooks Country Club from 1933 to 2017, when it re-adopted its name as Watchung Valley Country Club, which was in use from 1928 to 1933.

== Geography ==
According to the United States Census Bureau, the borough had a total area of 6.04 square miles (15.6 km^{2}), including 6.02 square miles (15.6 km^{2}) of land and 0.03 square miles (0.078 km^{2}) of water (0.46%).

Unincorporated communities, localities and place names located partially or completely within the borough include Washingtonville.

The borough borders Green Brook Township, North Plainfield and Warren Township in Somerset County; and Berkeley Heights, Plainfield, and Scotch Plains in Union County.

The Stony Brook flows through Watchung borough, making its way from Warren Township to the Watchung Lake, then through the gorge in the first Watchung mountain and over the Wetumpka Falls, on its way to the Green Brook.

The borough is roughly a 40-minute drive from New York City and a 20-minute drive from Newark.

== Demographics ==
Historical population
Census	Pop.	Note	%±
1930	906		—
1940	1,158		27.8%
1950	1,818		57.0%
1960	3,312		82.2%
1970	4,750		43.4%
1980	5,290		11.4%
1990	5,110		−3.4%
2000	5,613		9.8%
2010	5,801		3.3%
2020	6,449		11.2%
2023 (est.)	6,434	▼	−0.2%
Population sources: 1930; 1940–2000 2000; 2010 2020

=== 2020 census ===
As of the 2020 census, Watchung had a population of 6,449. The median age was 47.3 years. 20.1% of residents were under the age of 18 and 24.0% of residents were 65 years of age or older. For every 100 females there were 89.2 males, and for every 100 females age 18 and older there were 86.1 males age 18 and older.

100.0% of residents lived in urban areas, while 0.0% lived in rural areas.

There were 2,175 households in Watchung, of which 33.9% had children under the age of 18 living in them. Of all households, 67.7% were married-couple households, 10.9% were households with a male householder and no spouse or partner present, and 17.4% were households with a female householder and no spouse or partner present. About 16.3% of all households were made up of individuals and 10.0% had someone living alone who was 65 years of age or older.

There were 2,285 housing units, of which 4.8% were vacant. The homeowner vacancy rate was 1.4% and the rental vacancy rate was 4.0%.

Racial composition as of the 2020 census
Race	Number	Percent
White	4,402	68.3%
Black or African American	322	5.0%
American Indian and Alaska Native	6	0.1%
Asian	1,005	15.6%
Native Hawaiian and Other Pacific Islander	0	0.0%
Some other race	177	2.7%
Two or more races	537	8.3%
Hispanic or Latino (of any race)	519	8.0%

=== 2010 census ===
The 2010 United States census counted 5,801 people, 2,114 households, and 1,613 families in the borough. The population density was 962.7 people per square mile (371.7 people/km^{2}). There were 2,234 housing units at an average density of 370.7 units per square mile (143.1 units/km^{2}). The racial makeup was 80.52% (4,671) White, 3.45% (200) Black or African American, 0.12% (7) Native American, 12.69% (736) Asian, 0.00% (0) Pacific Islander, 0.81% (47) from other races, and 2.41% (140) from two or more races. Hispanic or Latino of any race were 5.29% (307) of the population.

Of the 2,114 households, 32.3% had children under the age of 18; 66.2% were married couples living together; 7.2% had a female householder with no husband present and 23.7% were non-families. Of all households, 20.1% were made up of individuals and 12.3% had someone living alone who was 65 years of age or older. The average household size was 2.69 and the average family size was 3.12.

23.2% of the population were under the age of 18, 4.7% from 18 to 24, 18.8% from 25 to 44, 32.1% from 45 to 64, and 21.1% who were 65 years of age or older. The median age was 46.9 years. For every 100 females, the population had 92.1 males. For every 100 females ages 18 and older there were 87.3 males.

The Census Bureau's 2006–2010 American Community Survey showed that (in 2010 inflation-adjusted dollars) median household income was $112,917 (with a margin of error of +/− $21,189) and the median family income was $144,883 (+/− $38,172). Males had a median income of $92,667 (+/− $15,969) versus $63,811 (+/− $15,306) for females. The per capita income for the borough was $59,177 (+/− $6,617). About 3.2% of families and 2.0% of the population were below the poverty line, including 1.2% of those under age 18 and none of those age 65 or over.

=== 2000 census ===
As of the 2000 United States census there were 5,613 people, 2,098 households, and 1,617 families residing in the borough. The population density was 933.0 inhabitants per square mile (360.2/km^{2}). There were 2,155 housing units at an average density of 358.2 units per square mile (138.3 units/km^{2}). The racial makeup of the borough was 84.30% White, 3.37% African American, 0.09% Native American, 9.85% Asian, 0.09% Pacific Islander, 0.71% from other races, and 1.59% from two or more races. Hispanic or Latino of any race were 2.99% of the population.

There were 2,098 households, out of which 30.8% had children under the age of 18 living with them, 70.4% were married couples living together, 4.1% had a female householder with no husband present, and 22.9% were non-families. 19.0% of all households were made up of individuals, and 6.9% had someone living alone who was 65 years of age or older. The average household size was 2.62 and the average family size was 3.00.

In the borough the population was spread out, with 21.9% under the age of 18, 4.7% from 18 to 24, 27.0% from 25 to 44, 30.1% from 45 to 64, and 16.3% who were 65 years of age or older. The median age was 43 years. For every 100 females, there were 95.4 males. For every 100 females age 18 and over, there were 93.3 males.

The median income for a household in the borough was $101,944, and the median income for a family was $120,764. Males had a median income of $80,658 versus $54,167 for females. The per capita income for the borough was $58,653. About 0.5% of families and 2.2% of the population were below the poverty line, including 1.6% of those under age 18 and 1.6% of those age 65 or over.

== Government ==
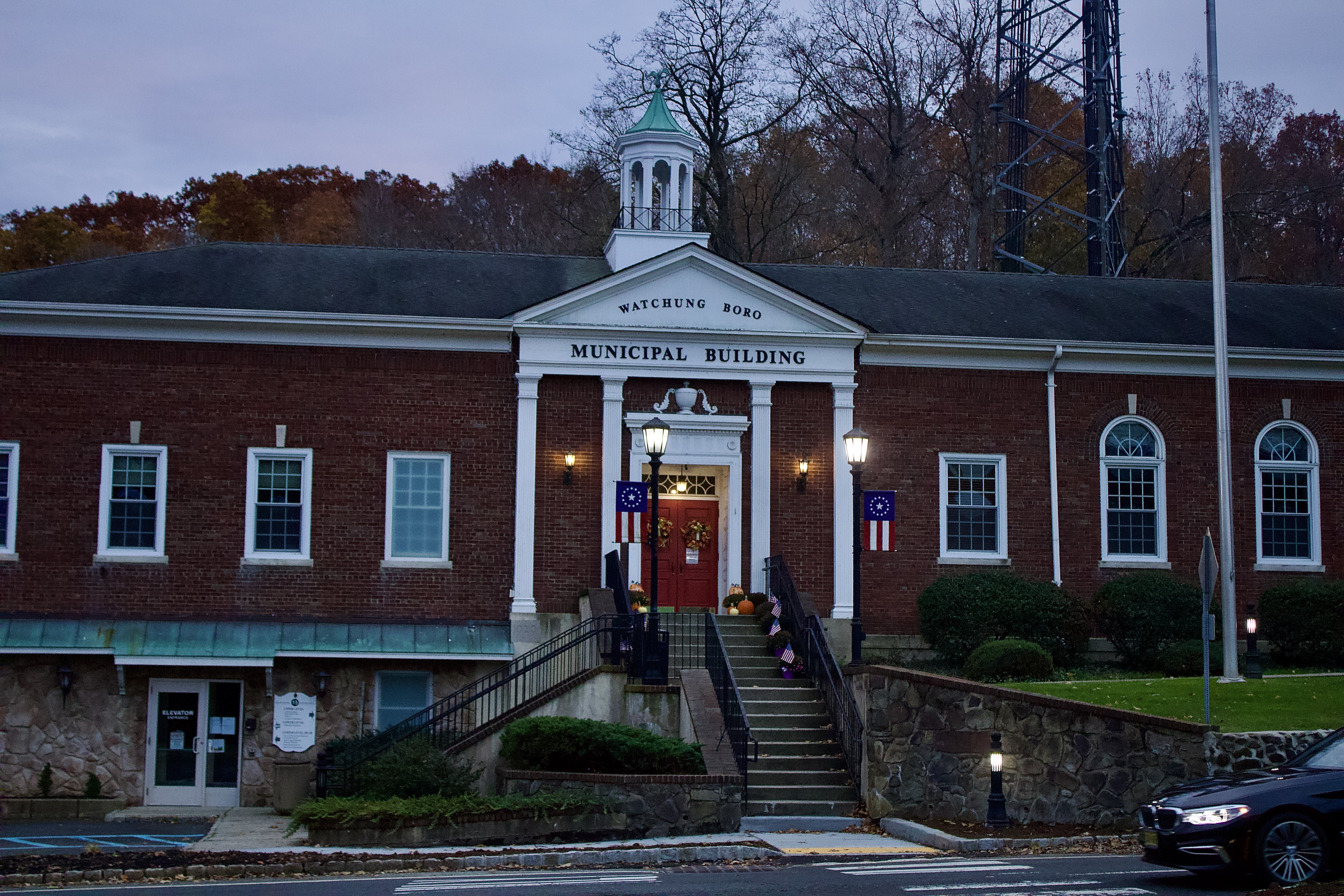
Watchung Municipal Building.

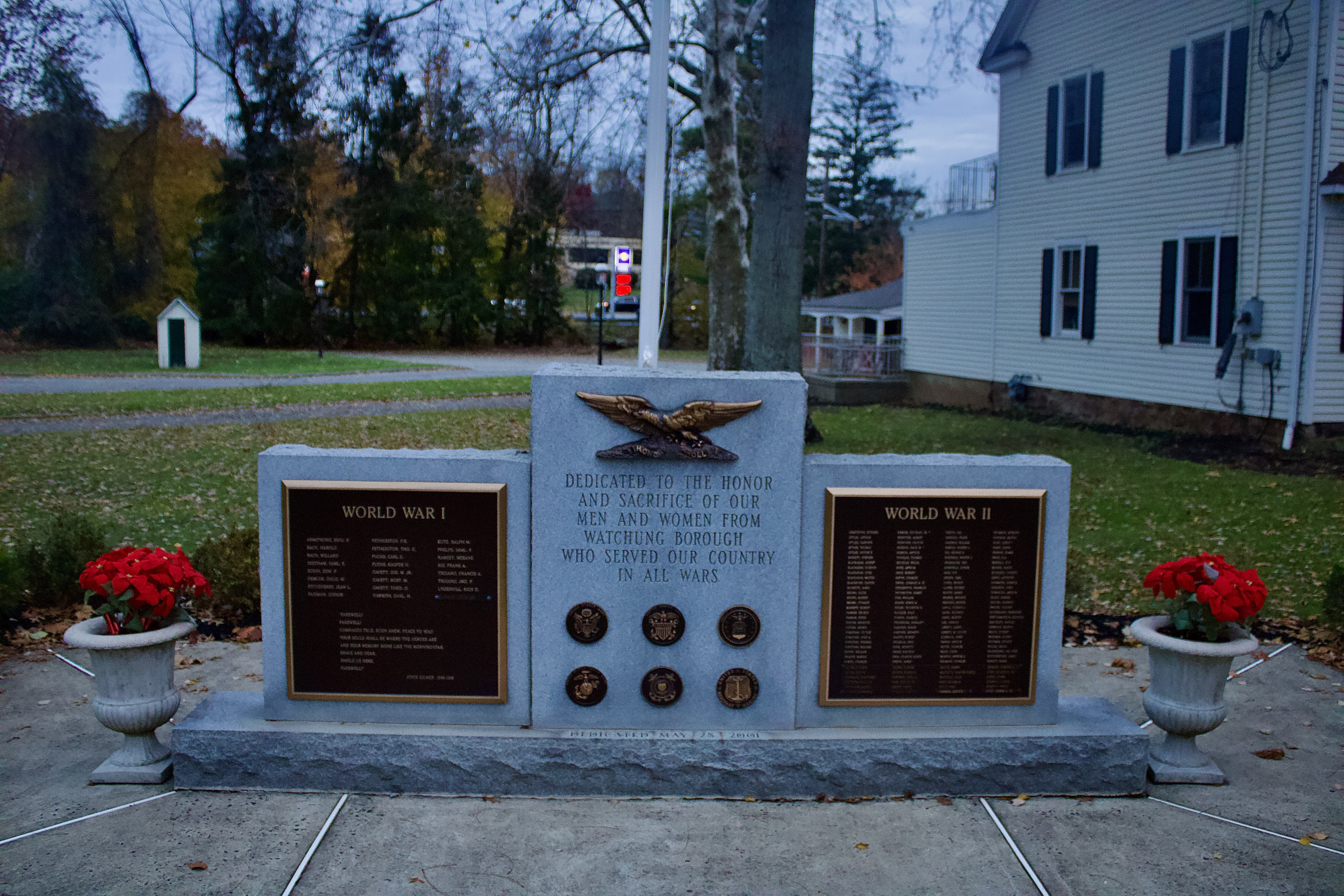
WWI and WWII Memorial.

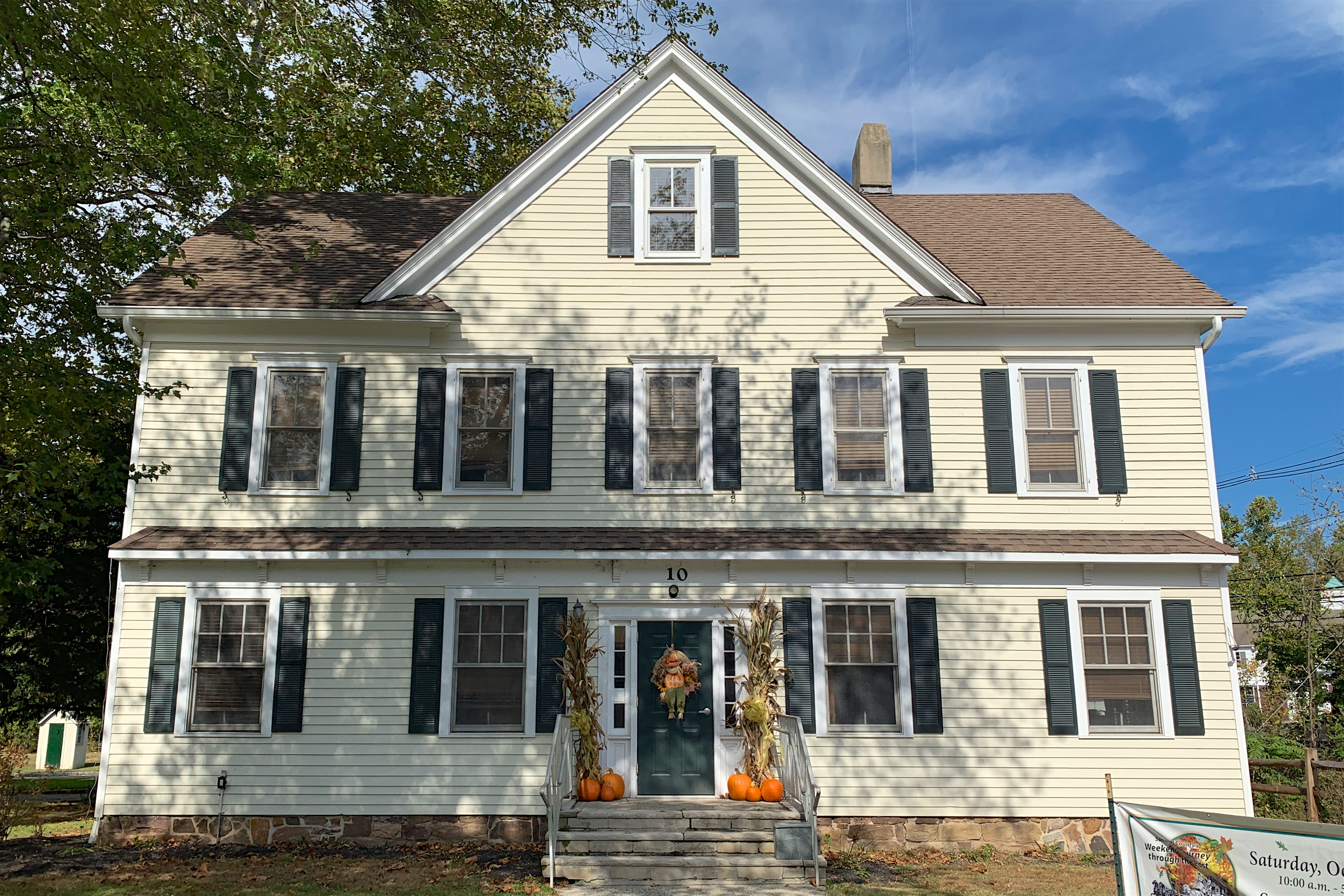
Texier House Museum.

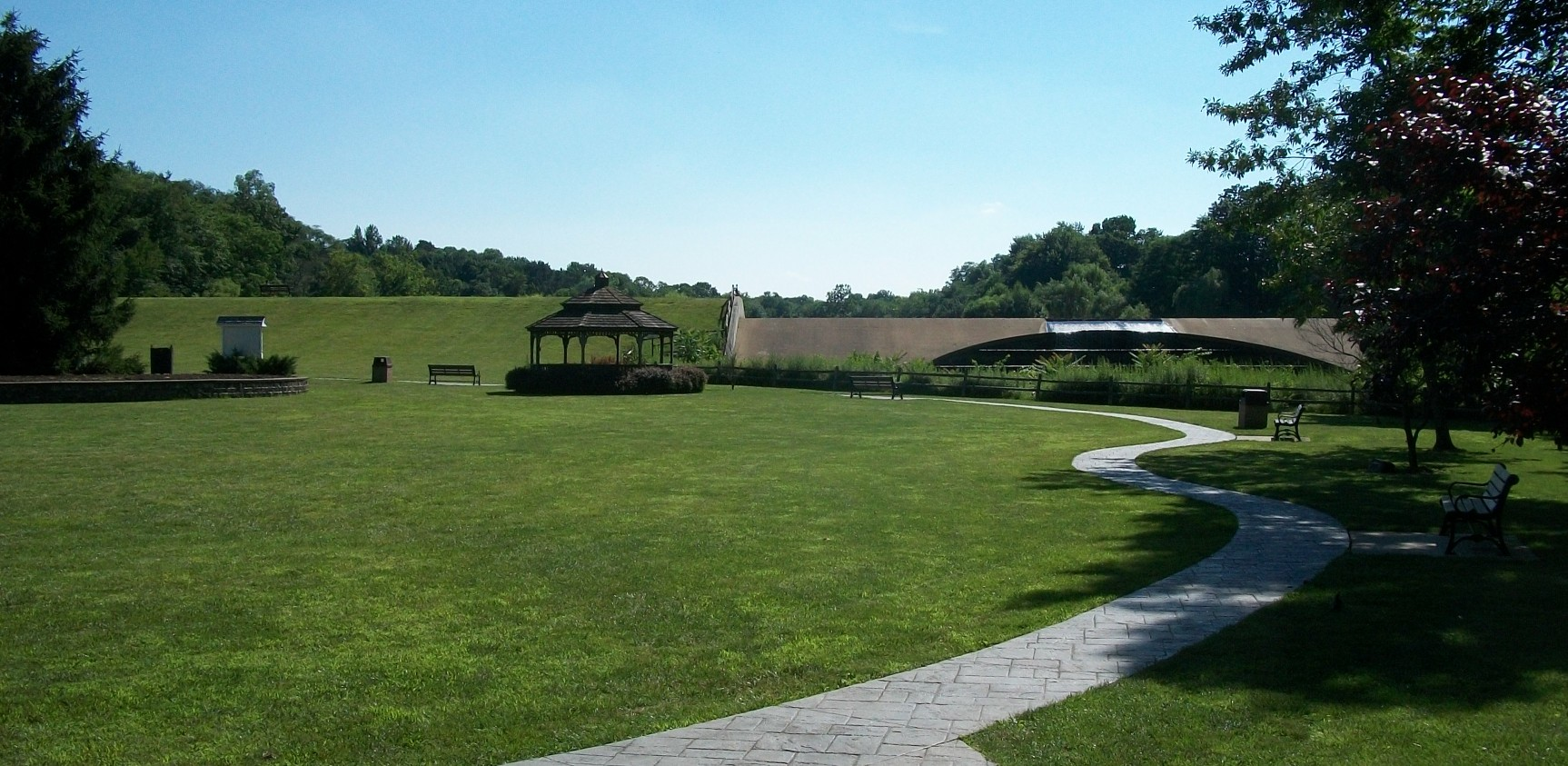
Park below the dam.

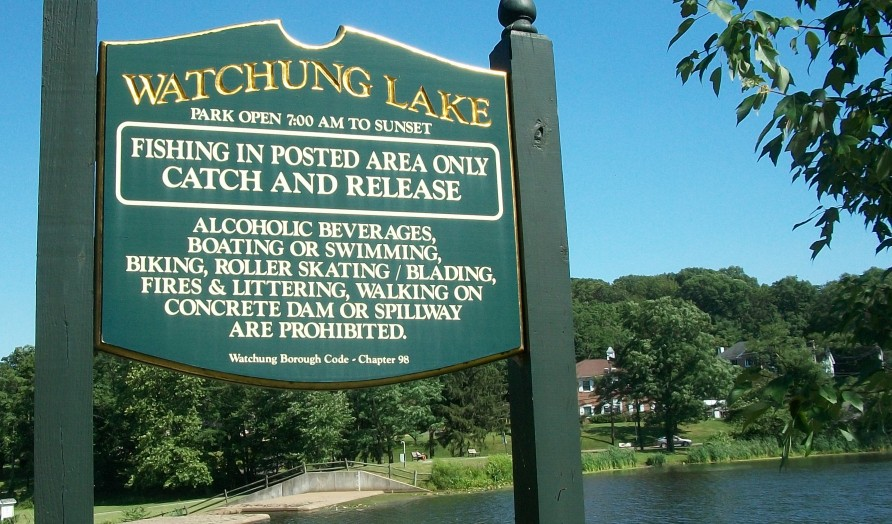
Sign post.

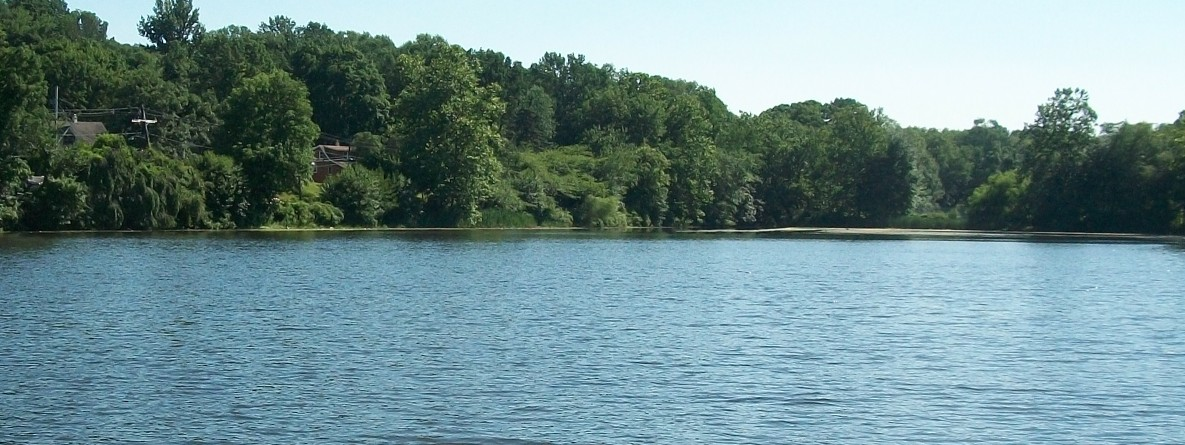
View of Watchung Lake.

=== Local government ===
Watchung is governed under the borough form of New Jersey municipal government, which is used in 218 municipalities (of the 564) statewide, making it the most common form of government in New Jersey. The governing body is comprised of a mayor and a borough council, with all positions elected at-large on a partisan basis as part of the November general election. A mayor is elected directly by the voters to a four-year term of office. The borough council includes six members elected to serve three-year terms on a staggered basis, with two seats coming up for election each year in a three-year cycle. The borough form of government used by Watchung is a "weak mayor / strong council" government in which council members act as the legislative body with the mayor presiding at meetings and voting only in the event of a tie. The mayor can veto ordinances subject to an override by a two-thirds majority vote of the council. The mayor makes committee and liaison assignments for council members, and most appointments are made by the mayor with the advice and consent of the council.

As of 2025, the mayor of Watchung Borough is Republican Ronald Jubin, whose term of office ends December 31, 2026. Members of the Watchung Borough Council are Council President Christine B. Ead (R, 2027), Sonia Abi-Habib (R, 2026), Curt S. Dahl (R, 2027), Paul Fischer (R, 2025), Robert L. Gibbs (R, 2026) and Paolo Marano (R, 2025).

In December 2019, the borough council selected Ronald Jubin to complete the term expiring in December 2020 that had been held by Robert L. Gibbs until he resigned from office the previous month.

=== Federal, state and county representation ===
Watchung is located in the 7th Congressional District and is part of New Jersey's 21st state legislative district.

For the 119th United States Congress, New Jersey's 7th congressional district is represented by Thomas Kean Jr. (R, Westfield). New Jersey is represented in the United States Senate by Democrats Cory Booker (Newark, term ends 2027) and Andy Kim (Moorestown, term ends 2031).

For the 2026–2027 session, the 21st legislative district of the New Jersey Legislature is represented in the State Senate by Jon Bramnick (R, Westfield) and in the General Assembly by Vincent Kearney (D, Garwood) and Andrew Macurdy (D, Summit).

Somerset County is governed by a five-member Board of County Commissioners, whose members are elected at-large to three-year terms of office on a staggered basis, with one or two seats coming up for election each year. At an annual reorganization meeting held in the first week of January, the board selects a Director and deputy director from among its members. As of 2025, Somerset County's County Commissioners are Director Shanel Robinson (D, Franklin Township, term as commissioner ends 2027; term as director ends 2026), Deputy Director Paul Drake (D, Hillsborough Township, term as commissioner and as deputy director ends 2026), Melonie Marano (D, Green Brook Township, 2028), Elizabeth Graner (D, Bernards Township, 2026; elected to serve an unexpired term) and Sara Sooy (D, Bedminster Township, 2027).

Constitutional officers, elected on a countywide basis are Clerk Steve Peter (D, Somerville, 2027), Sheriff Darrin Russo (D, Franklin Township, 2028) and Surrogate Bernice "Tina" Jalloh (D, Franklin Township, 2030).

=== Politics ===
United States presidential election results for Watchung
Year	Republican		Democratic		Third party(ies)	
Year	No.	%	No.	%	No.	%
2024	1,803	48.39%	1,819	48.82%	104	2.79%
2020	1,823	46.51%	2,044	52.14%	53	1.35%
2016	1,523	47.73%	1,551	48.61%	117	3.67%
2012	1,687	57.93%	1,198	41.14%	27	0.93%
2008	1,803	55.53%	1,415	43.58%	29	0.89%
2004	1,865	54.68%	1,516	44.44%	30	0.88%
2000	1,421	56.95%	997	39.96%	77	3.09%

As of March 2011, there were a total of 4,154 registered voters in Watchung, of which 845 (20.3% vs. 26.0% countywide) were registered as Democrats, 1,483 (35.7% vs. 25.7%) were registered as Republicans and 1,823 (43.9% vs. 48.2%) were registered as Unaffiliated. There were 3 voters registered as Libertarians or Greens. Among the borough's 2010 Census population, 71.6% (vs. 60.4% in Somerset County) were registered to vote, including 93.3% of those ages 18 and over (vs. 80.4% countywide).

In the 2016 presidential election, Democrat Hillary Clinton received 48.6% of the vote (1,551 cast), ahead of Republican Donald Trump who received 47.7% of the vote (1,523 votes), and other candidates with 3.7% (117 votes). 3,191 votes were cast in total. In the 2012 presidential election, Republican Mitt Romney received 57.9% of the vote (1,687 cast), ahead of Democrat Barack Obama with 41.1% (1,198 votes), and other candidates with 0.9% (27 votes), among the 2,931 ballots cast by the borough's 4,396 registered voters (19 ballots were spoiled), for a turnout of 66.7%. In the 2008 presidential election, Republican John McCain received 1,803 votes (55.0% vs. 46.1% countywide), ahead of Democrat Barack Obama with 1,415 votes (43.2% vs. 52.1%) and other candidates with 29 votes (0.9% vs. 1.1%), among the 3,277 ballots cast by the borough's 4,070 registered voters, for a turnout of 80.5% (vs. 78.7% in Somerset County). In the 2004 presidential election, Republican George W. Bush received 1,865 votes (54.5% vs. 51.5% countywide), ahead of Democrat John Kerry with 1,516 votes (44.3% vs. 47.2%) and other candidates with 30 votes (0.9% vs. 0.9%), among the 3,424 ballots cast by the borough's 3,795 registered voters, for a turnout of 90.2% (vs. 81.7% in the whole county).

Gubernatorial election results for Watchung
Year	Republican		Democratic		Third party(ies)	
Year	No.	%	No.	%	No.	%
2025	1,460	49.58%	1,465	49.75%	20	0.68%
2021	1,460	55.09%	1,172	44.23%	18	0.68%
2017	978	53.24%	808	43.98%	51	2.78%
2013	1,335	72.83%	466	25.42%	32	1.75%
2009	1,428	61.13%	720	30.82%	188	8.05%
2005	1,196	58.54%	789	38.62%	58	2.84%

In the 2013 gubernatorial election, Republican Chris Christie received 72.8% of the vote (1,335 cast), ahead of Democrat Barbara Buono with 25.4% (466 votes), and other candidates with 1.7% (32 votes), among the 1,861 ballots cast by the borough's 4,396 registered voters (28 ballots were spoiled), for a turnout of 42.3%. In the 2009 gubernatorial election, Republican Chris Christie received 1,428 votes (60.6% vs. 55.8% countywide), ahead of Democrat Jon Corzine with 720 votes (30.5% vs. 34.1%), Independent Chris Daggett with 178 votes (7.6% vs. 8.7%) and other candidates with 15 votes (0.6% vs. 0.7%), among the 2,357 ballots cast by the borough's 4,155 registered voters, yielding a 56.7% turnout (vs. 52.5% in the county).

United States Senate election results for Watchung1
Year	Republican		Democratic		Third party(ies)	
Year	No.	%	No.	%	No.	%
2024	1,800	49.64%	1,746	48.15%	80	2.21%
2018	1,562	53.86%	1,264	43.59%	74	2.55%
2012	1,565	56.72%	1,148	41.61%	46	1.67%
2006	1,260	56.83%	910	41.05%	47	2.12%

United States Senate election results for Watchung2
Year	Republican		Democratic		Third party(ies)	
Year	No.	%	No.	%	No.	%
2020	1,929	49.67%	1,923	49.51%	32	0.82%
2014	950	59.23%	628	39.15%	26	1.62%
2013	783	58.52%	546	40.81%	9	0.67%
2008	1,776	57.94%	1,226	40.00%	63	2.06%

== Education ==
Students in public school for pre-kindergarten through eighth grade are educated in the Watchung Borough Schools. As of the 2022–23 school year, the district, comprised of two schools, had an enrollment of 671 students and 62.5 classroom teachers (on an FTE basis), for a student–teacher ratio of 10.7:1. Schools in the district (with 2022–23 enrollment data from the National Center for Education Statistics) are Bayberry Elementary School with 410 students in grades PreK – 4 and Valley View School with 254 students in grades 5 – 8.

Watchung's students in public school for ninth through twelfth grades attend Watchung Hills Regional High School in Warren Township together with students from the neighboring communities of Green Brook Township and Warren Township (in Somerset County) and Long Hill Township (in Morris County). As of the 2022–23 school year, the high school had an enrollment of 1,741 students and 150.8 classroom teachers (on an FTE basis), for a student–teacher ratio of 11.5:1. The district's board of education is comprised of nine members, who are elected directly by the voters to serve three-year terms of office on a staggered basis, with three seats up for each year. Of the nine elected seats, two are allocated to Watchung.

Christian denomination Mount St. Mary Academy (9–12), which opened in 1908, is operated by the Sisters of Mercy under the supervision of Roman Catholic Diocese of Metuchen.

== Transportation ==
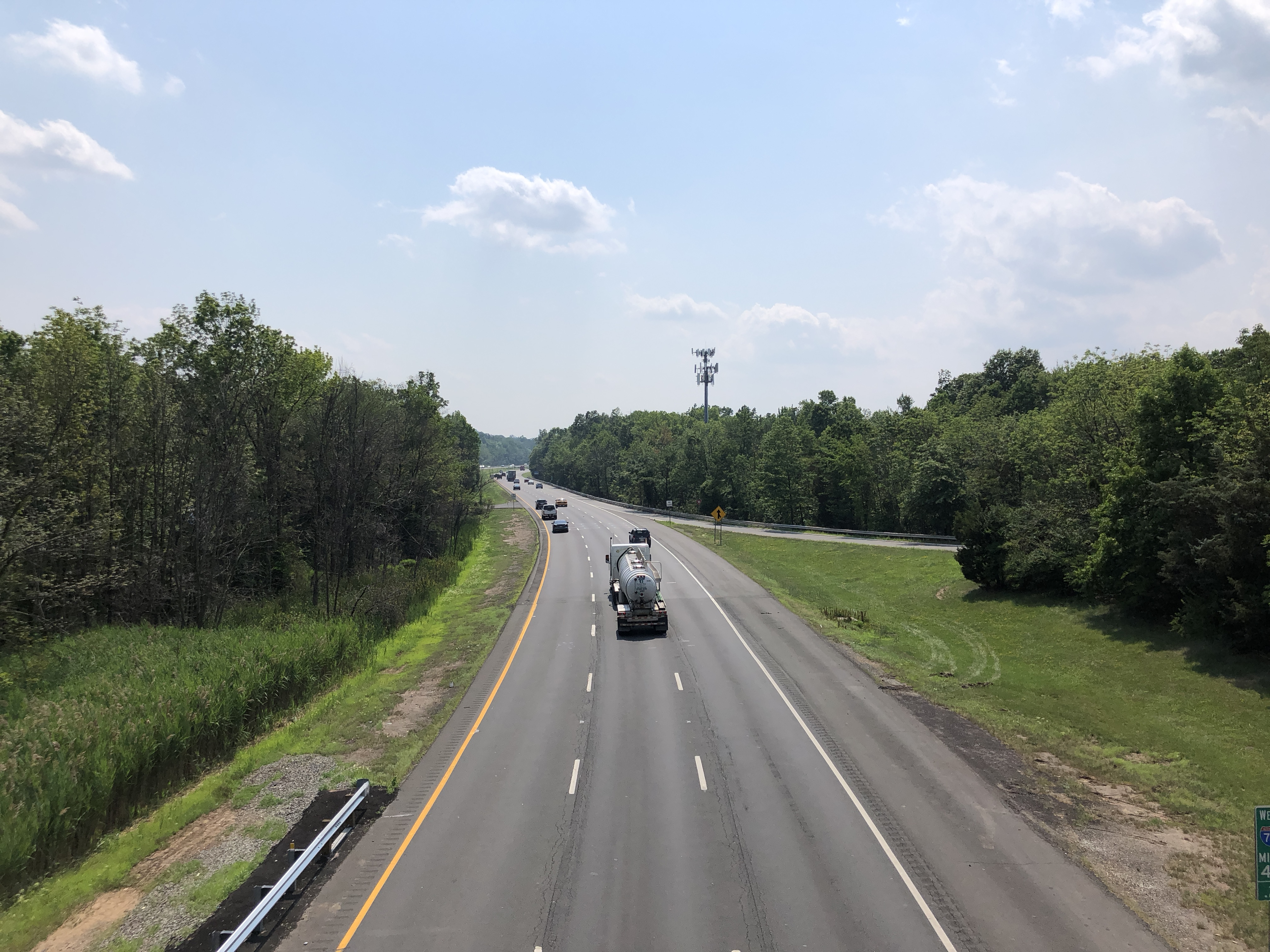
Interstate 78 westbound in Watchung

=== Roads and highways ===
As of May 2010, the borough had a total of 44.63 miles (71.83 km) of roadways, of which 33.24 miles (53.49 km) were maintained by the municipality, 9.07 miles (14.60 km) by Somerset County and 2.32 miles (3.73 km) by the New Jersey Department of Transportation and 1.09 miles (1.75 km) by the New Jersey Turnpike Authority.

Interstate 78 runs through the northwestern portion of the borough, including interchange 41, entering in the east from Warren Township and continuing for 1.4 miles (2.3 km) to Berkeley Heights Township in Union County. U.S. Route 22 passes briefly through the borough's southeast corner, entering from North Plainfield in the west and continuing into Scotch Plains Township in Union County.

County Route 527 (Mountain Boulevard / Valley Road) stretches 5.2 miles (8.4 km) across the length of the borough from Warren Township in the southwest to Berkeley Heights in the northeast. County Route 531 (Somerset Road / Hillcrest Road) runs for 1.4 miles (2.3 km) across the borough from North Plainfield in the south to the Interstate 78 interchange in Warren Township in the north.

Nearby NJ Transit rail service for Watchung residents with access to New York Penn Station and Newark Penn Station is available at the nearby Plainfield, Netherwood and Fanwood stations.

NJ Transit provides bus service on the 65, 114 to and from the Port Authority Bus Terminal in Midtown Manhattan and to Newark.

== Notable people ==
People who were born in, residents of, or otherwise closely associated with Watchung include:

- Billy Ard (born 1959), former New York Giants football player
- Dolo Tonight (born 1997), singer and indie rock musician
- Carl Banks (born 1962), former New York Giants football player
- Frank Bisignano (born 1959), 18th Commissioner of the Social Security Administration and Chief Executive Officer of the Internal Revenue Service
- Anne Casale (1930–2002, class of 1948), cookbook author and cooking teacher
- James Maxime DuPont (1912–1991), collector of meteorites
- Charles Aubrey Eaton (1868–1953), clergyman and politician who served in the United States House of Representatives, representing the New Jersey's 4th congressional district from 1925 to 1933, and the 5th district from 1933 to 1953
- Chaka Khan (born 1953), Grammy Award-winning singer-songwriter
- Kim Komando (born 1967, class of 1981), host of radio shows about consumer technology
- Stephen Kovacs (1972–2022), saber fencer and fencing coach, who died in prison after being charged with sexual assault
- Harold Norman Moldenke (1909–1996), botanist and taxonomist
- David Palmer, vocalist and songwriter, best known as a former member of Steely Dan and as the lyricist of the Carole King number two hit, "Jazzman"
- Laura Prepon (born 1980), actress who played the character of Donna Pinciotti on That '70s Show
- Bjarne Stroustrup (born 1950), inventor of the C++ programming language
- Bobby Thomson (1923–2010), former professional baseball player for the New York Giants, who hit the famous Shot Heard 'Round the World to win the 1951 NL pennant
- Anthony Volpe (born 2001), professional baseball shortstop for the New York Yankees
- Katt Williams (born 1973), comedian, actor and rapper
- H. Boyd Woodruff (1917–2017), soil microbiologist who discovered actinomycin and developed industrial production by fermentation of many natural products, including cyanocobalamin (a synthetic form of Vitamin B12), the avermectins and other important antibiotics
- Adella Wotherspoon (1903–2004), youngest and longest-lived survivor of the General Slocum, a steamship that sank in the East River killing over 1,000 in 1904
