= Robert Hovanec =

American sprinter

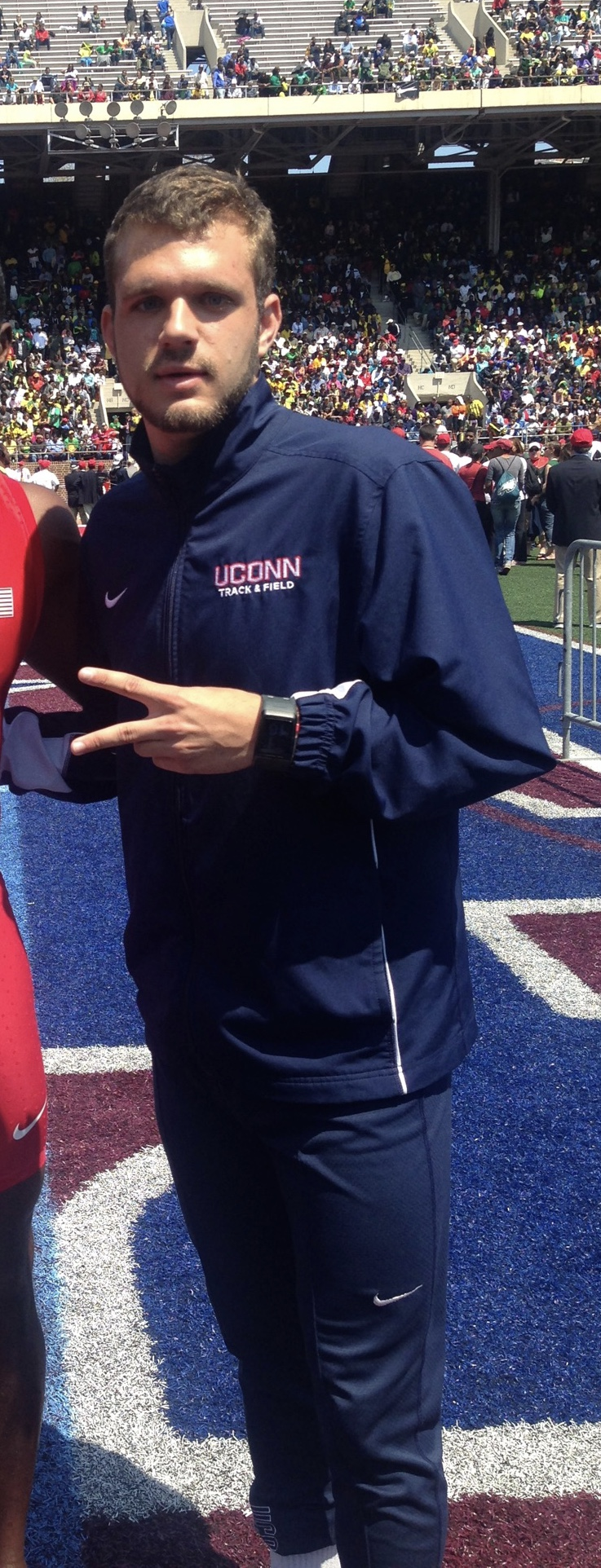
- Penn Relays 2014

Personal information
- Nationality: United States
- Born: September 29, 1993 (age 32)
- Height: 6 ft 1 in (1.85 m)
- Weight: 172 lb (78 kg)

Sport
- Sport: Track & Field
- Event: 400 metres
- College team: UConn Huskies

Achievements and titles
- Personal best: 400 m: 47.47 (AAC Championships)
Medal record
Men's athletics
Representing the United States
New Balance Indoor Nationals
Gold medal – first place	2012 NBIN	400m Emerging Elite

Robert Hovanec (born September 29, 1993) is an American sprinter athlete who competed in the 400m. He attended the University of Connecticut competing for the UConn Huskies in the American Athletic Conference. He attended high school at Watchung Hills Regional High School.

Hovanec is the 2012 New Balance Indoor Nationals 400m Emerging Elite Champion.

== Personal bests ==
Event	Best (m)	Venue	Date
400m (outdoor)	47.47	Storrs, Connecticut	May 17, 2015
400m (indoor)	48.12	Boston, Massachusetts	March 8, 2014

- All information taken from TFRRS profile.
