= County Route 531 (New Jersey) =

County highway in New Jersey, U.S.

County Route 531
- CR 531 highlighted in red

Route information
- Length: 13.6 mi (21.9 km)
- Existed: January 1, 1953–present

Major junctions
- South end: CR 514 in Edison
- US 1 in Edison; CR 501 in Metuchen; Route 27 in Metuchen; Route 28 in Plainfield; US 22 in North Plainfield; I-78 in Warren
- North end: CR 512 in Long Hill

Location
- Country: United States
- State: New Jersey
- Counties: Middlesex, Union, Somerset, Morris

Highway system
- County routes in New Jersey; 500-series routes
← CR 530	→ CR 532

County Route 531 (CR 531) is a county highway in the U.S. state of New Jersey. The highway extends 13.6 miles (21.9 km) from Woodbridge Avenue (CR 514) in Edison, Middlesex County, through Somerset County to Valley Road (CR 512) in Long Hill, Morris County.

== Route description ==
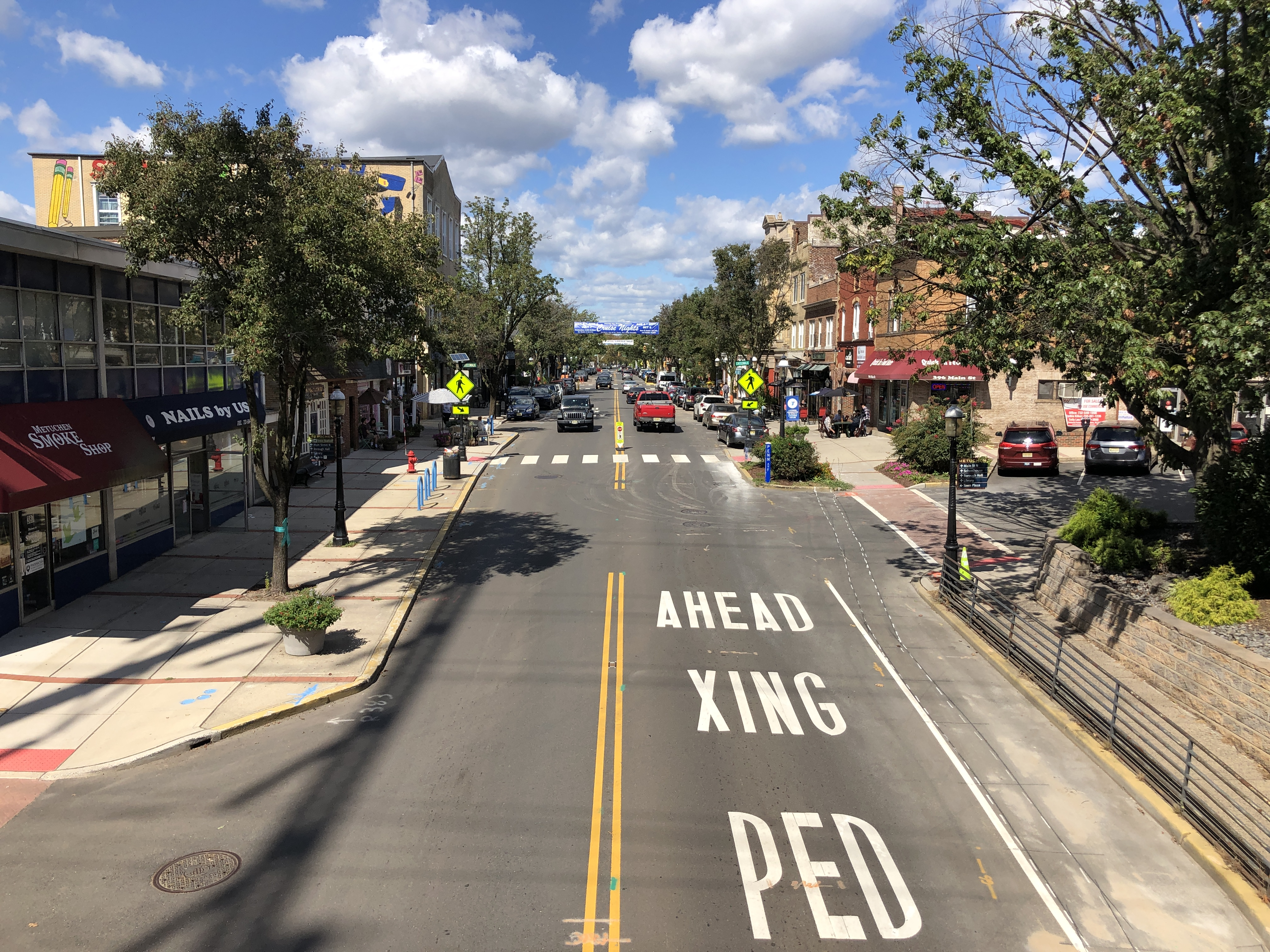
View northbound along CR 531 from the Northeast Corridor in Metuchen

CR 531 begins at CR 514 in Edison. It heads north, soon passing under the New Jersey Turnpike (I-95) without an interchange. It has a partial cloverleaf interchange with US 1 before crossing over I-287. One ramp from southbound I-287's exit 1B provides access to CR 531 south. CR 531 continues north through a residential neighborhood. Known as Main Street, it proceeds northward into Metuchen. It has an intersection of Amboy Avenue (CR 501) while passing through downtown Metuchen. It travels under Amtrak's Northeast Corridor at the Metuchen station serving NJ Transit's Northeast Corridor Line while it later intersects with Middlesex Avenue (Route 27). CR 531 makes a short jog to the west where it becomes known as Plainfield Avenue, then turns to the north on Plainfield Road, crossing back into Edison, passing by St. Joseph High School. It then turns west on to Park Avenue before turning to the north again.

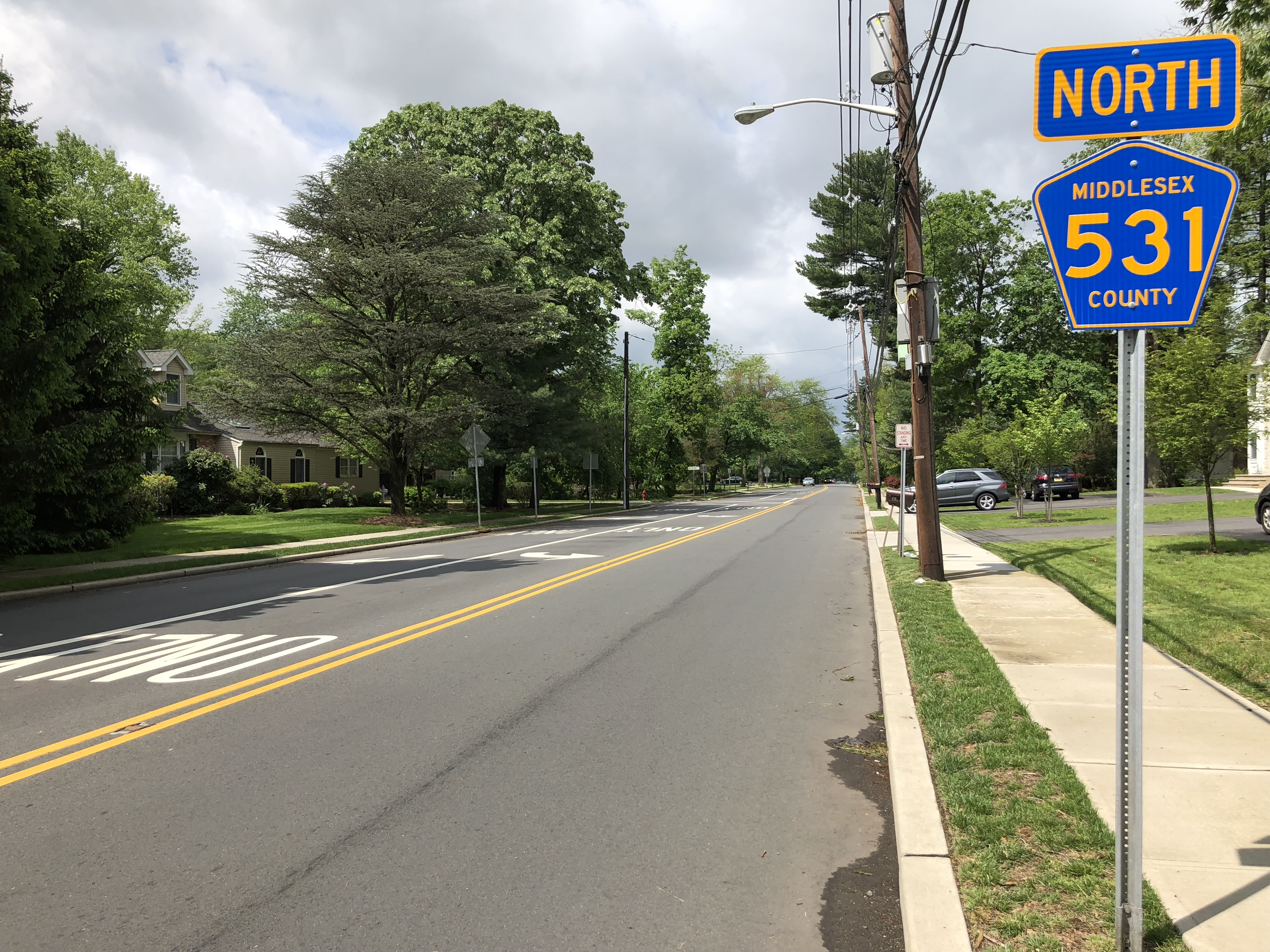
View north along CR 531 (Park Avenue) at Plainfield Road in Edison

It continues north through Edison and South Plainfield. The route passes near Putnam Park and intersects with Maple Avenue (CR 602) (also the terminus of unsigned CR 509). It crosses into Plainfield, Union County traveling near Cedar Brook Park and Plainfield High School. County maintenance of the road ends at the intersection of West 9th Street/East 9th Street in Plainfield while the city-maintained CR 531 continues northeast through downtown Plainfield along Park Avenue. In the center of the city's business district, it intersects with Route 28. Route 28 splits into one way street. Eastbound direction follows West 5th Street/East 5th Street and westbound direction follows West 4th Street/East 4th Street, which provides access to Plainfield station serving NJ Transit's Raritan Valley Line. Upon crossing the Green Brook into North Plainfield, Somerset County, county maintenance of the route resumes and the road name becomes Somerset Street. The mainline of CR 531 jogs to the east for one block at Pearl Street before turning northwest onto Watchung Avenue. However, Somerset Street is a borough-maintained alternate route of CR 531 which travels through the central business district of North Plainfield.

The two legs of CR 531 eventually reach the interchange with US 22. Watchung Avenue and Somerset Street provide right-in/right-out access to both sides of US 22, however for through traffic along CR 531, an overpass located between the two legs of the route is used to cross US 22. Heading northwest, the two legs of CR 531 come together and the road heads through a water gap formed by Stony Brook through the First Watchung Mountain towards Watchung. In the center of the borough, CR 531 and CR 527 intersect at the Watchung Circle. CR 531 and CR 527 share a brief concurrency along Valley Road to the northeast of the circle before breaking off onto Hillcrest Road while CR 527 continues east-northeast on Valley Road. This road heads north into Warren where it has an interchange with I-78 at its exit 40. CR 531 turns northwest to continue on Hillcrest Road and crosses the Passaic River into Long Hill, Morris County. The road reaches its northern terminus at the intersection of Valley Road (CR 512) in the community of Gillette, where CR 638 continues north on Mountain Avenue.

== Major intersections ==
County	Location	mi	km	Destinations	Notes
Middlesex	Edison	0.0	0.0	CR 514 (Woodbridge Avenue) to US 1 / Route 440 – Middlesex College	Southern terminus
Middlesex	Edison	0.6	0.97	US 1 to I-287 / N.J. Turnpike	Interchange
Middlesex	Edison	0.8	1.3	I-287	Ramp from southbound I-287; exits 1A-B (I-287)
Middlesex	Metuchen	1.5	2.4	CR 501 (Amboy Avenue)	
Middlesex	Metuchen	1.9	3.1	Route 27 (Middlesex Avenue) to G.S. Parkway – New Brunswick, Newark	
Middlesex	South Plainfield	6.4	10.3	CR 602 (Maple Avenue)	Southern terminus of unsigned CR 509 segment
Union	Plainfield	8.4– 8.4	13.5– 13.5	Route 28 east (West 5th Street/East 5th Street) Route 28 west (West 4th Street/East 4th Street)	To Plainfield station
Somerset	North Plainfield	9.7	15.6	US 22 – Newark, Somerville	Interchange
Somerset	Watchung	10.8	17.4	CR 527 south (Mountain Boulevard) – Warren CR 653 (Stirling Road) – Stirling	South end of the overlap with CR 527; Watchung Circle
Somerset	Watchung	10.9	17.5	CR 527 north (Valley Road) – Summit	North end of the overlap with CR 527
Somerset	Warren Township	11.8	19.0	I-78 to N.J. Turnpike – Clinton, Newark	Exit 40 (I-78)
Morris	Long Hill Township	13.6	21.9	CR 512 (Valley Road) CR 638 north (Mountain Avenue)	Northern terminus; southern terminus of CR 638
1.000 mi = 1.609 km; 1.000 km = 0.621 mi: Concurrency terminus; Incomplete access
