= Long Hill Township, New Jersey =

Township in Morris County, New Jersey, US

- Township
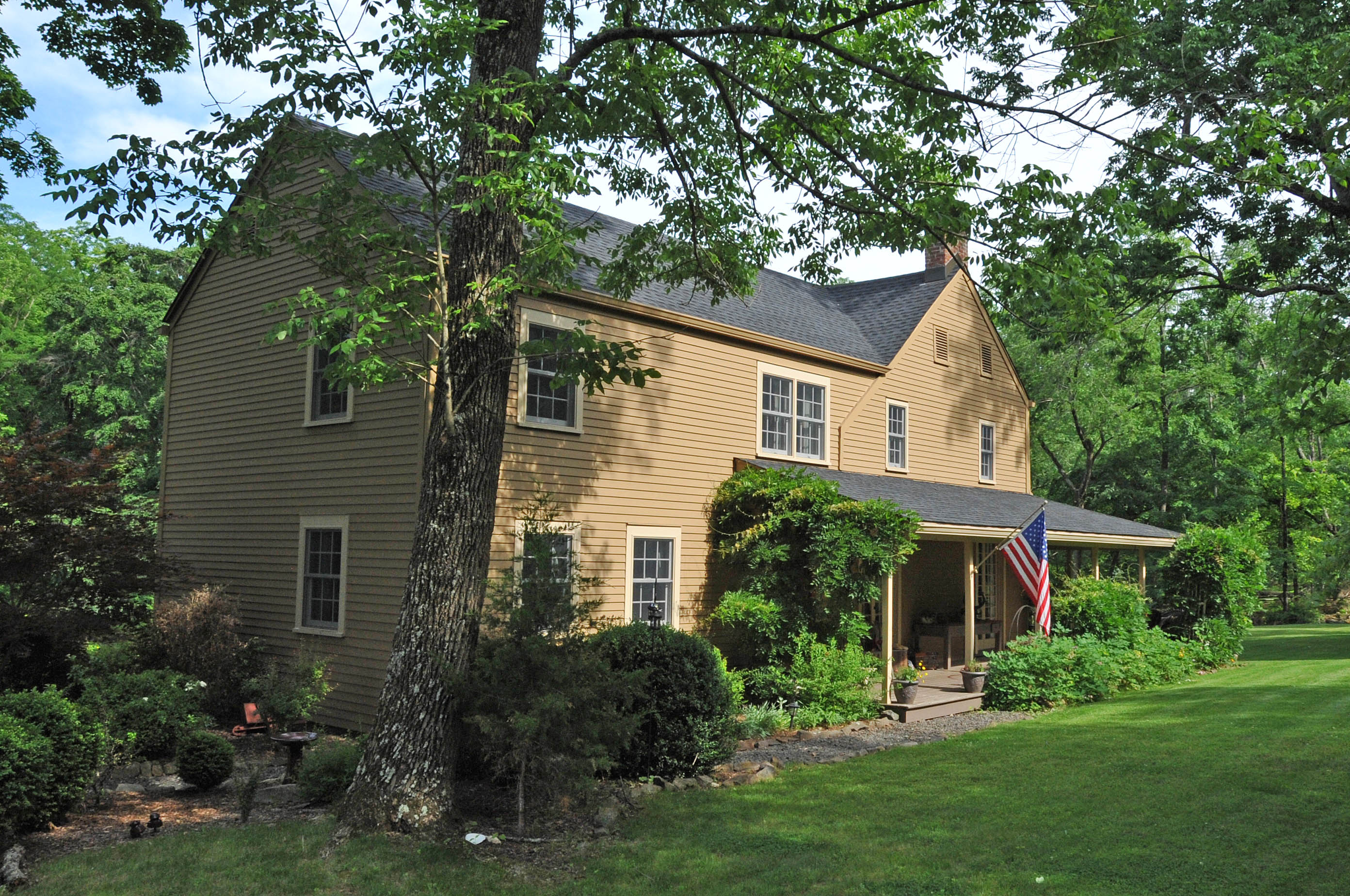
- Boyle–Hudspeth-Benson House in Millington

- Seal

- Location of Long Hill Township in Morris County highlighted in red (right). Inset map: Location of Morris County in New Jersey highlighted in orange (left).

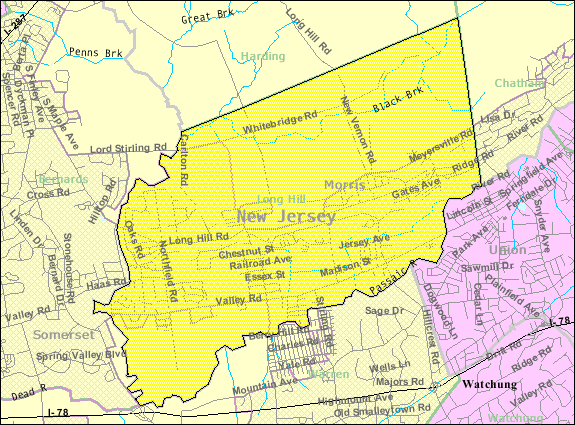
- Census Bureau map of Long Hill Township, New Jersey

- Location in Morris County Location in New Jersey Location in the United States
- Coordinates: 40.684835°N 74.492046°W
- Country: United States
- State: New Jersey
- County: Morris
- Incorporated: March 23, 1866 (as Passaic Township)
- Renamed: November 3, 1992 (as Long Hill Township)

Government
  - Type: Township
  - Body: Township Committee
  - Mayor: Matthew C. Dorsi (R, term ends December 31, 2026)
  - Administrator: Randy Bahr
  - Municipal clerk: Megan Phillips

Area
  - Total: 12.05 sq mi (31.22 km^{2})
  - Land: 11.80 sq mi (30.55 km^{2})
  - Water: 0.26 sq mi (0.67 km^{2}) 2.14%
  - Rank: 192nd of 565 in state 15th of 39 in county
- Elevation: 325 ft (99 m)

Population (2020)
  - Total: 8,629
  - Estimate (2023): 8,613
  - Rank: 277th of 565 in state 23rd of 39 in county
  - Density: 731.5/sq mi (282.4/km^{2})
  - Rank: 416th of 565 in state 31st of 39 in county
- Time zone: UTC−05:00 (Eastern (EST))
  - Summer (DST): UTC−04:00 (Eastern (EDT))
- ZIP Codes: 07933 – Gillette; 07946 – Millington; 07980 – Stirling
- Area code: 908
- FIPS code: 3402741362
- GNIS feature ID: 0882196
- Website: www.longhillnj.gov

Long Hill Township is a township in Morris County, in the U.S. state of New Jersey. As of the 2020 United States census, the township's population was 8,629, a decrease of 73 (−0.8%) from the 2010 census count of 8,702, which in turn reflected a decline of 75 (−0.9%) from the 8,777 counted in the 2000 census.

The township is situated in the southernmost part of Morris County bordering both Somerset and Union counties. It is bounded by the Passaic River to the south and west and to the north by the Great Swamp National Wildlife Refuge which covers 7,455 acres (3,017 ha) of land overseen by the United States Fish and Wildlife Service. Refuge lands also lie within neighboring Chatham and Harding townships.

Originally incorporated as Passaic Township in the 1860s, residents voted to change the town's name to Long Hill Township in 1992. It includes the communities of Gillette, Stirling, Millington, Meyersville and Homestead Park. NJ Transit rail service is available at the Gillette, Millington and Stirling stations.

== History ==
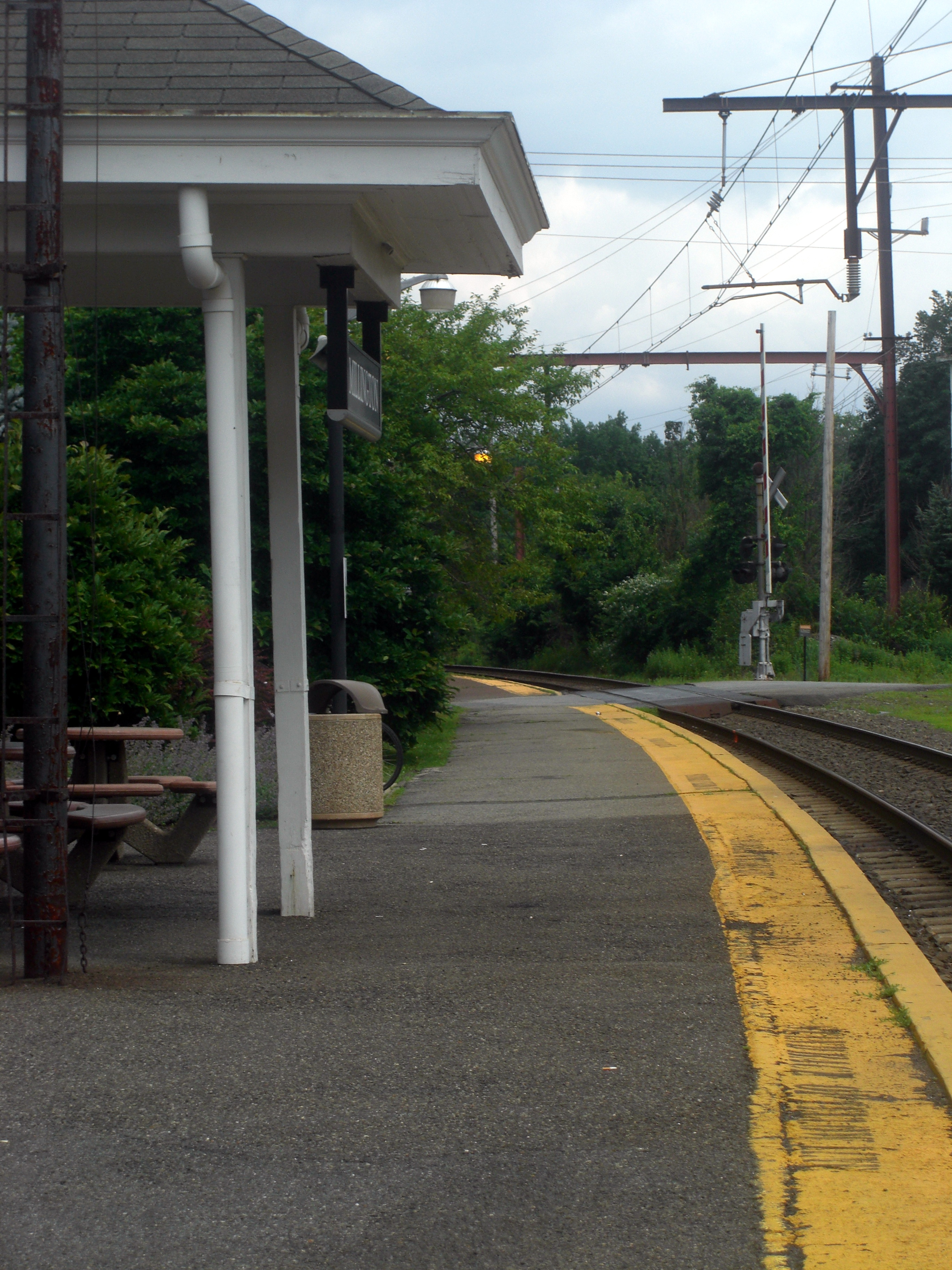
Millington station, one of three train stations in Long Hill Township.

Long Hill Township was incorporated as Passaic Township on March 23, 1866. On September 1, 1922, part of what was then Passaic Township was taken to form Harding Township. On November 3, 1992, by a 1,901 to 1,821 margin, the voters elected to change the name of the municipality to Long Hill Township, a change largely driven by the desire to avoid confusion with the City of Passaic, some 22 miles (35 km) away.

Garden State Fireworks, a firm based in Millington that dates back to 1890, has produced the annual July 4 fireworks show in Washington, D.C., on the National Mall. The Raptor Trust is a wild bird rehabilitation center located in Millington.

Clover Hill Swimming Club a club surrounding a lake in Millington, was the subject of lawsuit in which the Supreme Court of New Jersey ruled in 1966 that the club could not discriminate against an African American applicant for membership on the basis of the club being private.

== Geography ==
According to the United States Census Bureau, the township had a total area of 12.06 square miles (31.22 km^{2}), including 11.80 square miles (30.55 km^{2}) of land and 0.26 square miles (0.67 km^{2}) of water (2.14%).

Unincorporated communities, localities and place names located partially or completely within the township include Gillette, Millington, Stirling, Meyersville and Homestead Park a subdivision that was first developed in the 1920s.

The Great Swamp National Wildlife Refuge covers 7,455 acres (3,017 ha) of land overseen by the United States Fish and Wildlife Service and includes portions east of New Vernon Road that is unmanaged and accessible by visitors, while areas west of New Vernon Road are managed intensively and are not available to the public.

The township is located in the most southern part of Morris County. It is bounded by the Passaic River on the south and west and by the Great Swamp National Wildlife Refuge on the north. It borders both Somerset and Union counties. The township borders the municipalities of Chatham Township and Harding Township in Morris County; Bernards Township and Warren Township in Somerset County, and Berkeley Heights in Union County.

== Demographics ==
Historical population
Census	Pop.	Note	%±
1870	1,624		—
1880	1,896		16.7%
1890	1,821		−4.0%
1900	2,141		17.6%
1910	2,165		1.1%
1920	2,373		9.6%
1930	2,149		−9.4%
1940	2,664		24.0%
1950	3,429		28.7%
1960	5,537		61.5%
1970	7,393		33.5%
1980	7,275		−1.6%
1990	7,826		7.6%
2000	8,777		12.2%
2010	8,702		−0.9%
2020	8,629		−0.8%
2023 (est.)	8,613		−0.2%
Population sources: 1870–1920 1870; 1880–1890 1890–1910; 1910–1930 1940–2000; 2000 2010 2020

=== 2020 census ===
The 2020 United States census counted 8,629 people in 3,021 households. The median household income was $136,542.

Long Hill Township, Morris County, New Jersey – Racial and ethnic composition (NH = Non-Hispanic) Note: the US Census treats Hispanic/Latino as an ethnic category. This table excludes Latinos from the racial categories and assigns them to a separate category. Hispanics/Latinos may be of any race.
Race / Ethnicity	Pop 2000	Pop 2010	Pop 2020	% 2000	% 2010	% 2020
White alone (NH)	7,916	7,385	6,576	90.19%	84.87%	76.21%
Black or African American alone (NH)	31	48	73	0.35%	0.55%	0.85%
Native American or Alaska Native alone (NH)	10	4	6	0.11%	0.05%	0.07%
Asian alone (NH)	420	520	693	4.79%	5.98%	8.03%
Pacific Islander alone (NH)	1	1	4	0.01%	0.01%	0.05%
Some Other Race alone (NH)	3	14	66	0.03%	0.16%	0.76%
Mixed Race/Multi-Racial (NH)	93	116	299	1.06%	1.33%	3.47%
Hispanic or Latino (any race)	303	614	912	3.45%	7.06%	10.57%
Total	8,777	8,702	8,629	100.00%	100.00%	100.00%

=== 2010 census ===
The 2010 United States census counted 8,702 people, 3,105 households, and 2,434 families in the township. The population density was 734.3 per square mile (283.5/km^{2}). There were 3,226 housing units at an average density of 272.2 per square mile (105.1/km^{2}). The racial makeup was 90.61% (7,885) White, 0.62% (54) Black or African American, 0.09% (8) Native American, 5.98% (520) Asian, 0.01% (1) Pacific Islander, 1.06% (92) from other races, and 1.63% (142) from two or more races. Hispanic or Latino of any race were 7.06% (614) of the population.

Of the 3,105 households, 37.7% had children under the age of 18; 67.6% were married couples living together; 7.7% had a female householder with no husband present and 21.6% were non-families. Of all households, 18.3% were made up of individuals and 8.5% had someone living alone who was 65 years of age or older. The average household size was 2.79 and the average family size was 3.19.

25.6% of the population were under the age of 18, 6.1% from 18 to 24, 20.3% from 25 to 44, 33.2% from 45 to 64, and 14.7% who were 65 years of age or older. The median age was 43.9 years. For every 100 females, the population had 97.1 males. For every 100 females ages 18 and older there were 94.7 males.

The Census Bureau's 2006–2010 American Community Survey showed that (in 2010 inflation-adjusted dollars) median household income was $120,691 (with a margin of error of ± $11,097) and the median family income was $142,059 (± $14,704). Males had a median income of $91,509 (± $24,098) versus $75,558 (± $11,204) for females. The per capita income for the borough was $54,508 (± $4,818). About 1.7% of families and 2.8% of the population were below the poverty line, including 3.0% of those under age 18 and 1.6% of those age 65 or over.

=== 2000 census ===
As of the 2000 United States census there were 8,777 people, 3,139 households, and 2,457 families residing in the township. The population density was 726.8 inhabitants per square mile (280.6/km^{2}). There were 3,206 housing units at an average density of 265.5 per square mile (102.5/km^{2}). The racial makeup of the township was 92.75% White, 0.39% African American, 0.17% Native American, 4.79% Asian, 0.03% Pacific Islander, 0.56% from other races, and 1.31% from two or more races. Hispanic or Latino of any race were 3.45% of the population.

There were 3,139 households, out of which 36.9% had children under the age of 18 living with them, 69.6% were married couples living together, 6.2% had a female householder with no husband present, and 21.7% were non-families. 18.2% of all households were made up of individuals, and 7.2% had someone living alone who was 65 years of age or older. The average household size was 2.79 and the average family size was 3.19.

In the township the age distribution of the population shows 26.3% under the age of 18, 4.4% from 18 to 24, 31.2% from 25 to 44, 25.4% from 45 to 64, and 12.6% who were 65 years of age or older. The median age was 39 years. For every 100 females, there were 94.2 males. For every 100 females age 18 and over, there were 93.1 males.

The median income for a household in the township was $84,532, and the median income for a family was $103,037. Males had a median income of $71,827 versus $46,100 for females. The per capita income for the township was $42,613. About 2.3% of families and 3.3% of the population were below the poverty line, including 1.7% of those under age 18 and 3.2% of those age 65 or over.

== Government ==
=== Local government ===
Long Hill Township is governed under the Township form of New Jersey municipal government, one of 141 municipalities (of the 564) statewide that use this form, the second-most commonly used form of government in the state. The Township Committee is comprised of five members, who are elected directly by the voters at-large in partisan elections to serve three-year terms of office on a staggered basis, with either one or two seats coming up for election each year as part of the November general election in a three-year cycle. At an annual reorganization meeting held during the first week of January, the Township Committee selects one of its members to serve as Mayor and another as deputy mayor.

As of 2025, the members of the township committee are Mayor Matthew C. Dorsi (R, 2026), Deputy Mayor Guy Thomas Piserchia (R, 2027), Scott Lavender (R, 2026), Aubrey Reichard-Eline (R, 2027) and Victor T. Verlezza (R, 2025).

=== Federal, state, and county representation ===
Long Hill Township is located in the 7th Congressional District and is part of New Jersey's 21st state legislative district.

For the 119th United States Congress, New Jersey's 7th congressional district is represented by Thomas Kean Jr. (R, Westfield). New Jersey is represented in the United States Senate by Democrats Cory Booker (Newark, term ends 2027) and Andy Kim (Moorestown, term ends 2031).

For the 2026–2027 session, the 21st legislative district of the New Jersey Legislature is represented in the State Senate by Jon Bramnick (R, Westfield) and in the General Assembly by Vincent Kearney (D, Garwood) and Andrew Macurdy (D, Summit).

Morris County is governed by a Board of County Commissioners comprised of seven members who are elected at-large in partisan elections to three-year terms on a staggered basis, with either one or three seats up for election each year as part of the November general election. Actual day-to-day operation of departments is supervised by County Administrator Deena Leary.

As of 2026, Morris County's Commissioners (with all terms ending December 31) are Director Stephen H. Shaw (R, Mountain Lakes, 2027), Deputy Director John Krickus (R, Washington Township, 2027), Douglas Cabana (R, Boonton Township, 2028), Thomas J. Mastrangelo (R, Montville, 2028), Christine Myers (R, Harding Township, 2028), Tayfun Selen (R, Chatham Township, 2026), and Deborah Smith (R, Denville Township, 2027).

The county's constitutional officers are County Clerk Ann F. Grossi (R, Parsippany–Troy Hills, 2028), Sheriff James M. Gannon (R, Boonton Township, 2025) and Surrogate Heather Darling (R, Roxbury, 2029).

=== Politics ===
United States presidential election results for Long Hill Township 2024 2020 2016 2012 2008 2004
Year	Republican		Democratic		Third party(ies)	
Year	No.	%	No.	%	No.	%
2024	2,689	48.91%	2,685	48.84%	124	2.26%
2020	2,729	47.17%	2,961	51.18%	96	1.66%
2016	2,480	51.23%	2,163	44.68%	198	4.09%
2012	2,605	60.18%	1,690	39.04%	34	0.79%
2008	2,789	57.23%	2,024	41.53%	60	1.23%
2004	2,808	59.95%	1,833	39.13%	43	0.92%

As of March 2011, there were a total of 5,854 registered voters in Long Hill Township, of which 1,154 (19.7%) were registered as Democrats, 2,245 (38.3%) were registered as Republicans and 2,450 (41.9%) were registered as Unaffiliated. There were 5 voters registered as Libertarians or Greens.

In the 2012 presidential election, Republican Mitt Romney received 60.2% of the vote (2,605 cast), ahead of Democrat Barack Obama with 39.0% (1,690 votes), and other candidates with 0.8% (34 votes), among the 4,347 ballots cast by the township's 6,187 registered voters (18 ballots were spoiled), for a turnout of 70.3%. In the 2008 presidential election, Republican John McCain received 57.0% of the vote (2,789 cast), ahead of Democrat Barack Obama with 41.4% (2,024 votes) and other candidates with 1.2% (60 votes), among the 4,894 ballots cast by the township's 6,155 registered voters, for a turnout of 79.5%. In the 2004 presidential election, Republican George W. Bush received 59.8% of the vote (2,808 ballots cast), outpolling Democrat John Kerry with 39.0% (1,833 votes) and other candidates with 0.7% (43 votes), among the 4,696 ballots cast by the township's 6,112 registered voters, for a turnout percentage of 76.8.

Gubernatorial election results for Long Hill Township
Year	Republican		Democratic		Third party(ies)	
Year	No.	%	No.	%	No.	%
2025	2,270	50.87%	2,163	48.48%	29	0.65%
2021	2,120	57.39%	1,550	41.96%	24	0.65%
2017	1,833	56.71%	1,242	38.43%	157	4.86%
2013	2,173	75.03%	686	23.69%	37	1.28%
2009	2,284	64.87%	865	24.57%	372	10.57%
2005	2,009	60.73%	1,195	36.12%	104	3.14%

In the 2013 gubernatorial election, Republican Chris Christie received 75.0% of the vote (2,173 cast), ahead of Democrat Barbara Buono with 23.7% (686 votes), and other candidates with 1.3% (37 votes), among the 2,932 ballots cast by the township's 6,142 registered voters (36 ballots were spoiled), for a turnout of 47.7%. In the 2009 gubernatorial election, Republican Chris Christie received 64.4% of the vote (2,284 ballots cast), ahead of Democrat Jon Corzine with 24.4% (865 votes), Independent Chris Daggett with 10.1% (358 votes) and other candidates with 0.4% (14 votes), among the 3,546 ballots cast by the township's 6,058 registered voters, yielding a 58.5% turnout.

United States Senate election results for Long Hill Township1
Year	Republican		Democratic		Third party(ies)	
Year	No.	%	No.	%	No.	%
2024	2,630	50.51%	2,490	47.82%	87	1.67%
2018	2,372	55.52%	1,759	41.18%	141	3.30%
2012	2,424	59.87%	1,572	38.82%	53	1.31%
2006	1,983	60.74%	1,210	37.06%	72	2.21%

United States Senate election results for Long Hill Township2
Year	Republican		Democratic		Third party(ies)	
Year	No.	%	No.	%	No.	%
2020	2,790	49.99%	2,721	48.75%	70	1.25%
2014	1,381	59.47%	902	38.85%	39	1.68%
2013	1,293	60.96%	816	38.47%	12	0.57%
2008	2,753	61.92%	1,610	36.21%	83	1.87%

== Education ==
The Long Hill Township School System serves public school students in pre-kindergarten through eighth grade. As of the 2019–20 school year, the district, comprised of three schools, had an enrollment of 894 students and 80.6 classroom teachers (on an FTE basis), for a student–teacher ratio of 11.1:1. Schools in the district (with 2019–20 enrollment data from the National Center for Education Statistics) are Gillette School with 223 students in grades Pre-K–1, Millington School with 397 students in grades 2–5 and Central Middle School with 269 students in grades 6–8.

Long Hill Township's high school students in public school for ninth through twelfth grades attend Watchung Hills Regional High School in Warren Township. Students from Long Hill Township and from the neighboring communities of Green Brook Township, Warren Township and Watchung (in Somerset County) attend the school. As of the 2019–20 school year, the high school had an enrollment of 1,948 students and 160.6 classroom teachers (on an FTE basis), for a student–teacher ratio of 12.1:1. The high school district's board of education has nine members, who are elected directly by the voters to serve three-year terms of office on a staggered basis, with three seats up for each year. Of the nine elected seats, three are allocated to Long Hill Township.

St. Vincent de Paul School was a Catholic school in Stirling that operated under the auspices of the Roman Catholic Diocese of Paterson. The school closed in June 2016 in the wake of declining enrollment and financial challenges. The school was recognized with the Blue Ribbon School Award of Excellence in 2012.

== Transportation ==
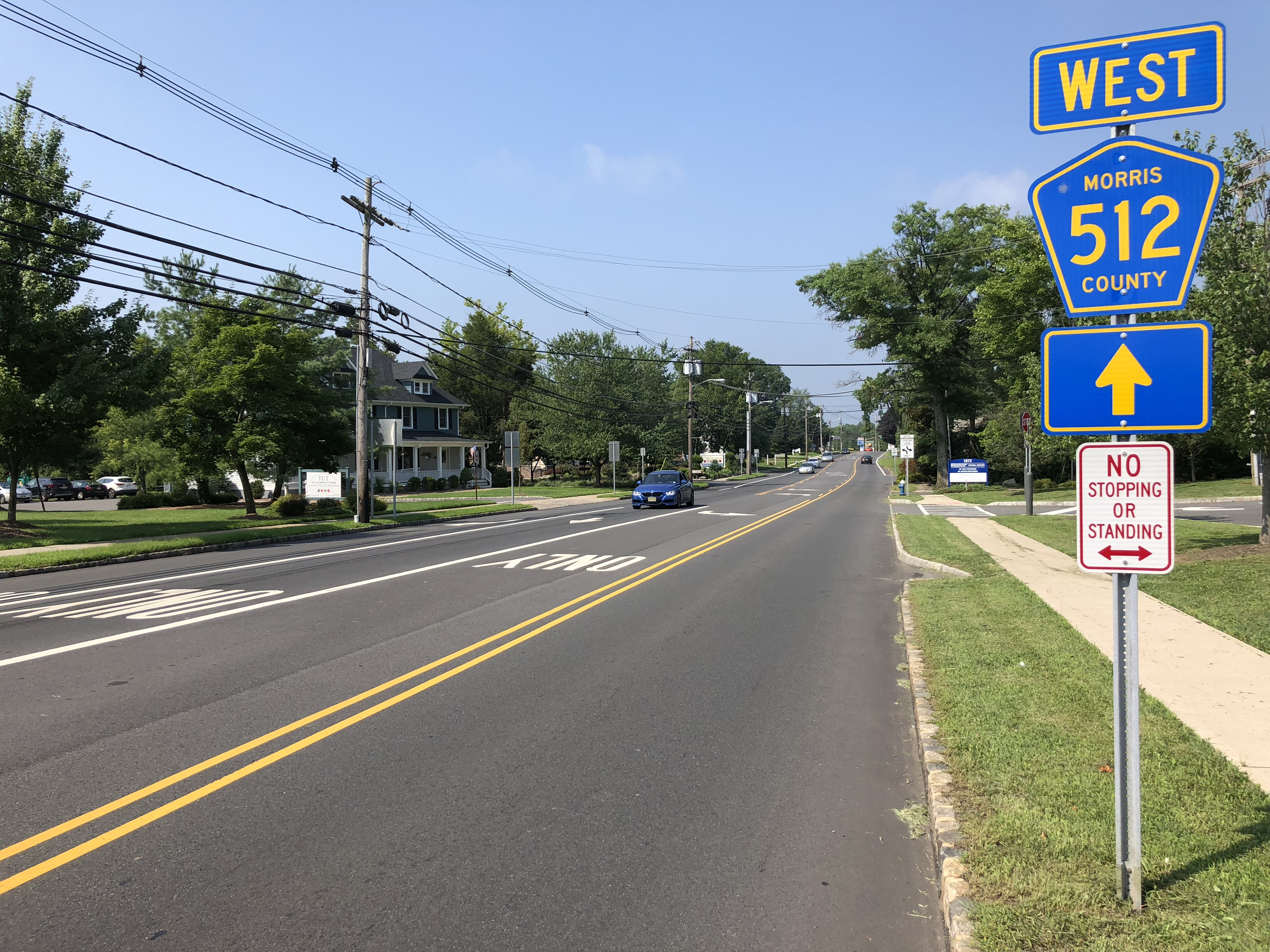
County Route 512 westbound in Long Hill Township

=== Roads and highways ===
As of May 2010, the township had a total of 59.57 miles (95.87 km) of roadways, of which 46.31 miles (74.53 km) were maintained by the municipality and 13.26 miles (21.34 km) by Morris County.

No Interstate, U.S. or state highways directly serve Long Hill Township. The most prominent roads within the township are county routes, including County Route 512 and County Route 531. Interstate 78 and Interstate 287 are both nearby and cross adjacent municipalities.

=== Public transportation ===
NJ Transit rail service is available at the Gillette, Millington and Stirling stations, offering service on the Gladstone Branch to Newark Broad Street Station and Hoboken Terminal.

NJ Transit offered service on the MCM8 route until 2010, when subsidies offered to the local provider were eliminated as part of budget cuts.

Lakeland Bus Lines provides Route 78 rush-hour service from Bedminster to the Port Authority Bus Terminal in Midtown Manhattan.

== Communications ==
Long Hill is in Area code 908. The legacy exchange is 908–647 (Millington 7), is one of the last manual offices in New Jersey converted dial operation in the early 1960s.

The current cable company serving the area is Comcast which provides local TV, internet, and phone service. Most of Long Hill now also has access to Verizon's FiOS service. Original cable company Patriot Media was sold to Comcast in early 2008.

Long Hill Township operates a public service television channel on Comcast (Channel 25) and Verizon (Channel 37).

== Long Hill Television ==
A Government-access television (GATV) cable TV channel is available for citizens of Long Hill Township that has important news updates, local activities, local weather, storm warnings, etc. It is on Comcast channel 29 (all programming) and Verizon FiOS channels 37 (public meetings and programs) and 38 (community bulletin board).

== Notable people ==
People who were born in, residents of, or otherwise closely associated with Long Hill Township include:

- Jessie Baylin (born 1984), singer-songwriter
- David Bird (c. 1959–2014), journalist and longtime reporter at The Wall Street Journal, whose work "was instrumental in the expansion of energy markets reporting in the 1990s
- George B. Cooper (1808–1866), politician who was elected to the United States House of Representatives in 1858, but left office after a year when Congress awarded the seat to his opponent in 1860
- George Estock (1924–2010), MLB pitcher who played for the Boston Braves in 1951
- Eugenio Fernandi (1922–1991), operatic tenor
- Jack H. Jacobs (born 1945), Medal of Honor recipient in 1969 for his heroic actions during the Vietnam War
- Robert Tappan Morris (born 1965), computer scientist and entrepreneur best known for creating the Morris Worm in 1988, considered the first computer worm on the Internet
- Bill Murray (born 1997), guard for the New England Patriots
- Keith Sims (born 1967), former professional football offensive lineman who played in the NFL for the Miami Dolphins and Washington Redskins
