= Eugenio Fernandi =

Italian opera singer

Eugenio Fernandi as Pinkerton in Madama Butterfly, Metropolitan Opera House (photo with 1958 dedication)

Eugenio Fernandi as Edgardo in Lucia di Lammermoor, Metropolitan Opera House, 1958

Eugenio Fernandi (1922 in Pisa – 8 August 1991) was an Italian tenor, associated with both lyric and spinto roles.

Eugenio Fernandi was born in Pisa and raised in Valperga, metropolitan city of Turin, where he began his vocal studies with Aureliano Pertile. He later entered the opera school at La Scala in Milan, and began appearing there in small roles. His first major role was as Giovanni Battista in Virgilio Mortari's La figlia di diavolo in 1954, followed by the Duke in Rigoletto and Pinkerton in Madama Butterfly. He also sang with success at La Fenice in Venice, the Maggio Musicale Fiorentino in Florence, and the Teatro San Carlo in Naples.

In 1957, he made his debut at the Vienna State Opera as Cavaradossi in Tosca, later singing Alfredo Germont, Rodolfo, Riccardo, and Radames. He appeared as Don Carlos at the Salzburg Festival, in 1958 and 1960.

He joined the Metropolitan Opera as a leading tenor on February 19, 1958, debuting there as Pinkerton. Of that performance, a March 3, 1958, Time magazine review noted that Fernandi "belted out thundering, on-target salvos of sound that rocked the house," further praising that "physically and vocally it is surely the handsomest Butterfly ever mounted on a U.S. stage." From 1958 to 1971, Fernandi sang eight seasons with the Met in thirteen roles, including Mario Cavaradossi, Edgardo, Enzo, Ismaele, Arrigo, etc.

His opera recording career was limited to the 1957 EMI recording of Turandot, opposite Maria Callas and Dame Elisabeth Schwarzkopf, conducted by Tullio Serafin. He also recorded the tenor part in Verdi's "Requiem" in the 1959 (EMI) set conducted by Maestro Serafin. However, in recent years a few live recordings have surfaced, notably Lucia di Lammermoor (1957), again with Callas, and Tosca (1957), opposite Magda Olivero and Scipio Colombo, both for RAI, and Nabucco, opposite Leonie Rysanek, Cornell MacNeil, and Cesare Siepi.

A resident of West Orange, New Jersey, Fernandi moved to the Millington section of Long Hill Township, New Jersey approximately 1987. Fernandi died on August 8, 1991, at the Mayo Clinic in Minnesota, due to complications related to surgery.

== Sources ==
- Operissimo.com
