= Boyle–Hudspeth-Benson House =

Historic New Jersey house

- U.S. National Register of Historic Places
- New Jersey Register of Historic Places
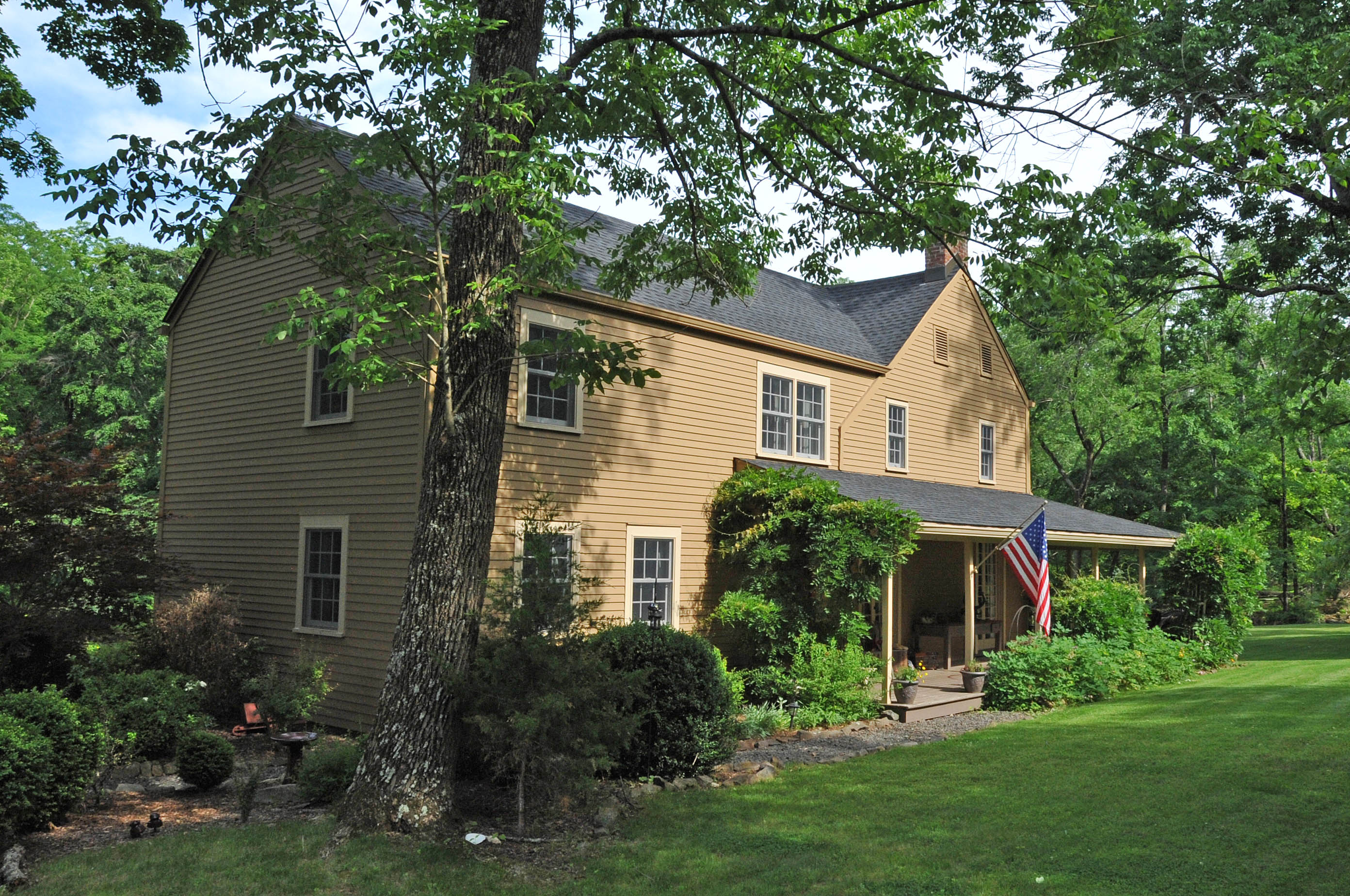
- Boyle–Hudspeth-Benson House

- Location within Morris County, New Jersey Location within New Jersey Location within the United States
- Location: 100 Basking Ridge Road, Millington, Long Hill Township, New Jersey
- Coordinates: 40°41′2″N 74°31′23″W
- Area: 33 acres (13 ha)
- Built: 1750
- NRHP reference No.: 75001151
- NJRHP No.: 2137

Significant dates
- Added to NRHP: February 10, 1975
- Designated NJRHP: December 5, 1974

Boyle–Hudspeth-Benson House is located in the Millington section of Long Hill Township, Morris County, New Jersey, United States. The house was built in 1750 and added to the National Register of Historic Places on February 10, 1975.

== See also ==
- National Register of Historic Places listings in Morris County, New Jersey
