= County Route 512 (New Jersey) =

County highway in New Jersey, U.S.

County Route 512
- CR 512 highlighted in red

Route information
- Length: 32.96 mi (53.04 km)
- Existed: January 1, 1953–present

Major junctions
- West end: CR 513 in Califon
- CR 517 in Tewksbury; US 206 in Peapack-Gladstone; US 202 in Far Hills; CR 525 in Bernards Township; CR 531 in Long Hill Township
- East end: Route 24 / Route 124 / CR 527 in Summit

Location
- Country: United States
- State: New Jersey
- Counties: Hunterdon, Somerset, Morris, Union

Highway system
- County routes in New Jersey; 500-series routes
← CR 511	→ CR 513

County Route 512 (CR 512) is a county highway in the U.S. state of New Jersey. The highway extends 32.96 miles (53.04 km) from High Bridge Road (CR 513) in Califon to Springfield Avenue (CR 527) / Route 24 in Summit.

== Route description ==
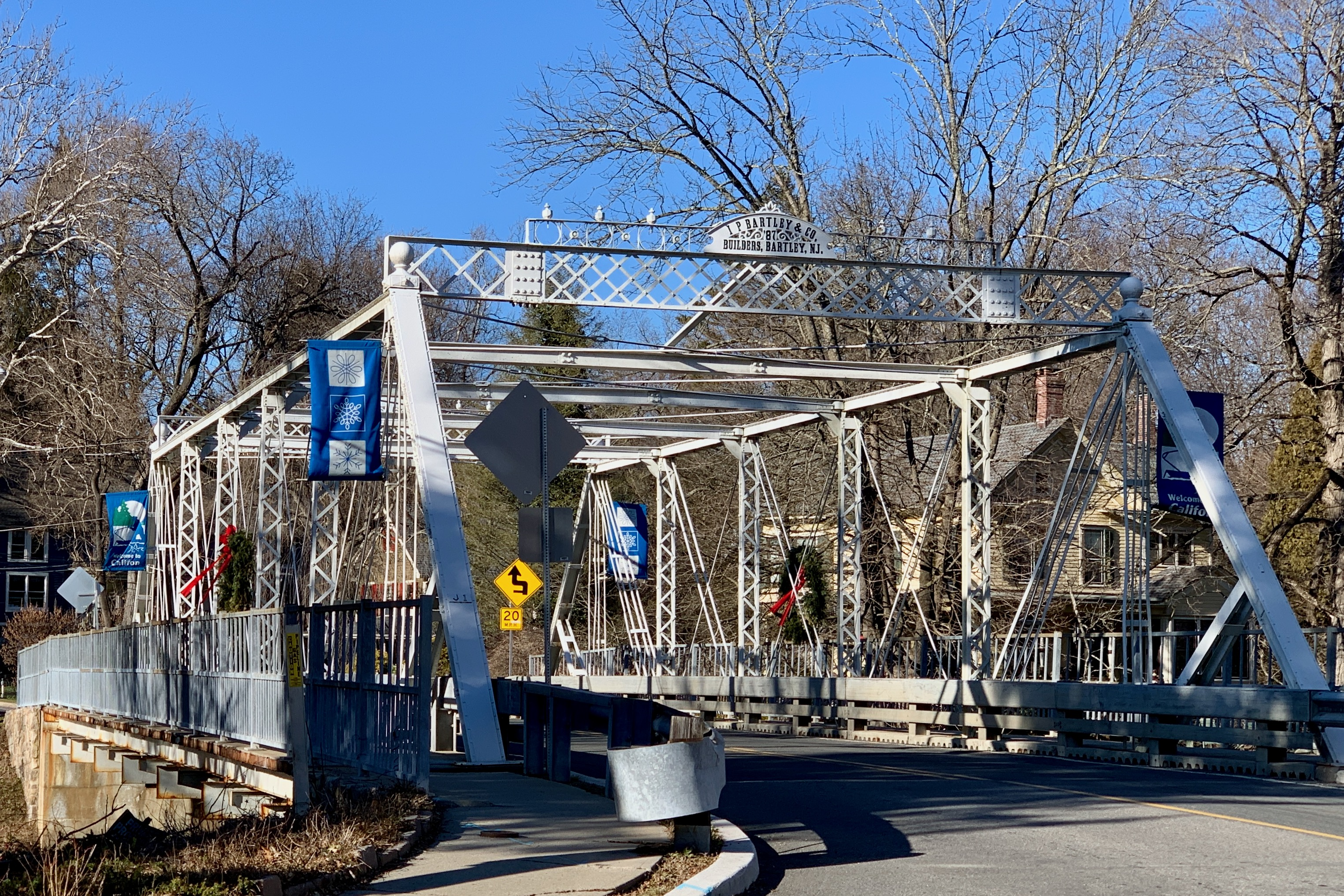
CR 512 crossing the South Branch Raritan River in Califon

CR 512 begins at an intersection with CR 513 in Califon, Hunterdon County, heading southeast on two-lane undivided Main Street past homes. Following the crossing the South Branch Raritan River, the route turns south onto Academy Street and makes a turn east into wooded areas. After intersecting Main Street again, CR 512 passes by the J. K. Apgar Farmhouse, an 18th-century stone farmhouse listed on the National Register of Historic Places. It then becomes Fairmount Road West and heads into Tewksbury Township, where it passes through a mix of farms, woods, and homes. Upon crossing CR 517, CR 512 becomes Fairmount Road East and continues through more rural areas, reaching the residential community of Pottersville.

After crossing the Lamington River, CR 512 enters Bedminster Township in Somerset County and becomes Pottersville Road, heading out of Pottersville and back into areas of farms and woods with a few residences. The road enters Peapack-Gladstone and immediately crosses US 206 in woodland before entering residential areas. CR 512 intersects CR 671 and turns south onto Main Street, passing the Gladstone station, which serves as the western terminus of New Jersey Transit's Gladstone Branch. The road runs to the east of the railroad tracks before turning east and then south at a junction with CR 647. The route continues through a mix of homes and businesses, intersecting CR 661. CR 512 enters a mix of fields and residences before turning southeast and crossing over the Gladstone Branch and heading back into Bedminster Township, at which point it begins running to the west of the North Branch Raritan River through woodland. The route crosses the river into Far Hills and becomes Peapack Drive as it continues through wooded residential areas a short distance to the west of the Gladstone Branch.

CR 512 intersects US 202 and turns northeast to form a concurrency with that route, passing between homes to the northwest and fields to the southeast. CR 512 splits from US 202 near the Far Hills Station by heading southeast on Liberty Corner Road. The route continues through a mix of fields and woods before turning south and then east in a wooded area. The road runs between more fields to the north and woods to the south before turning southeast and passing over I-287. At the Douglas Road intersection, CR 512 enters Bernards Township and heads south through wooded residential areas, making a sharp turn to the east. The route comes to an intersection with CR 640, where it turns south onto Valley Road, passing through woodland and fields. The road turns sharply to the east again and crosses CR 525. The route is briefly a four-lane road past CR 525, narrowing to two lanes at Spring Valley Road. The road passes through a mix of wooded neighborhoods and open fields before turning southeast into forested residential areas at the CR 613 junction. Upon intersecting CR 651, the route makes a turn to the northeast.

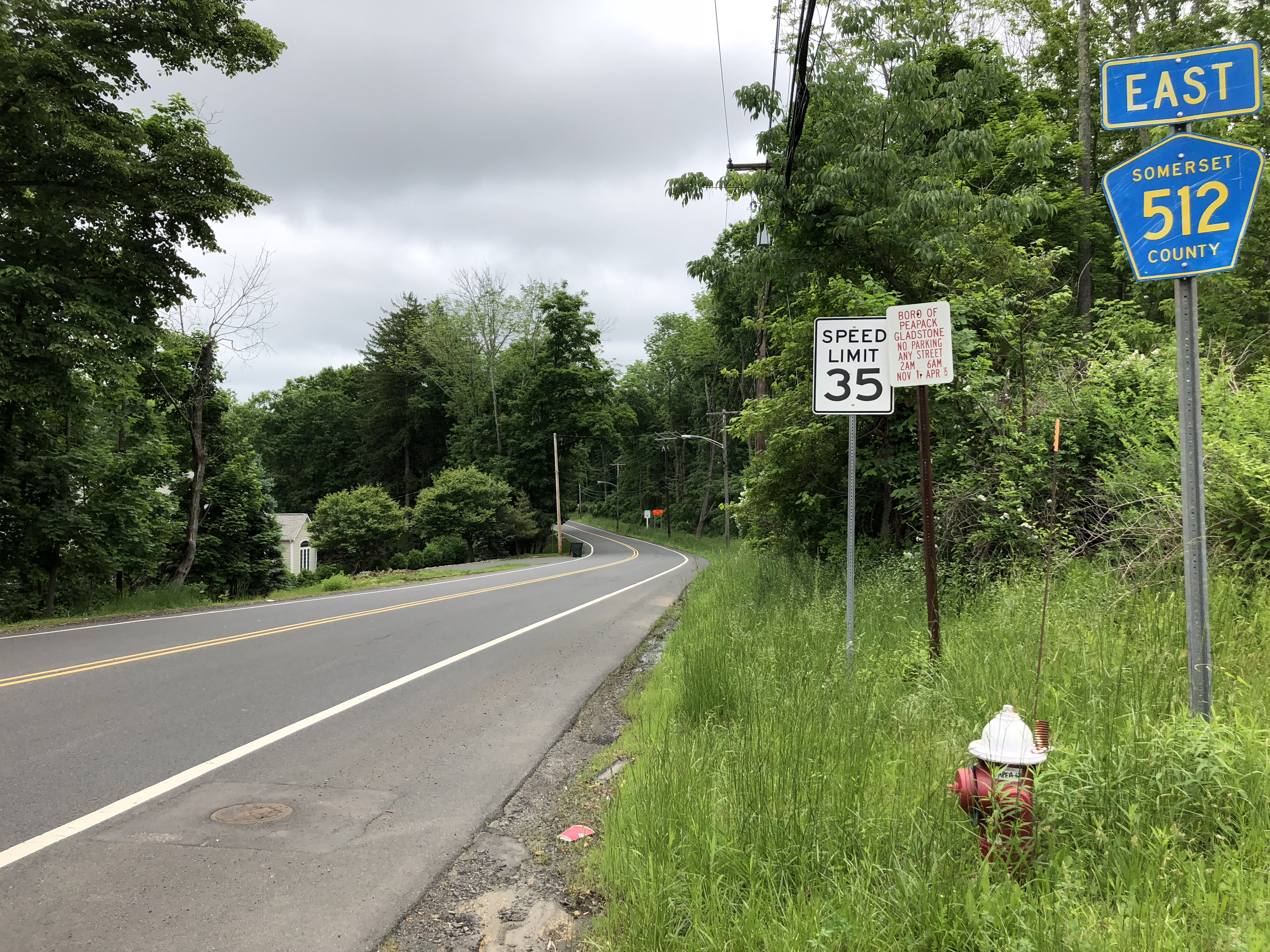
View east along CR 512 at Route 206 in Peapack-Gladstone

After crossing the Passaic River into Long Hill Township in Morris County, CR 512 continues east through suburban neighborhoods and intersects CR 605. Farther east, the road comes into commercial areas and reaches a junction with CR 606. Following this intersection, the route briefly is a divided highway at the entrance to a shopping center before becoming undivided again and passing a mix of homes and businesses. The route comes to a junction with CR 531 and CR 638 before heading northeast into wooded residential neighborhoods and passing over the Gladstone Branch and the Passaic River.

After crossing the Passaic River a second time, CR 512 continues into Berkeley Heights in Union County, becoming Springfield Avenue and passing through business areas with some homes. The road reaches a junction with CR 663 and continues northeast, entering more residential surroundings before it crosses into New Providence. In New Providence, CR 512 comes to an intersection with CR 647 in commercial areas before turning to the east into wooded neighborhoods. The road makes a turn to the northeast and intersects CR 649, at which point CR 512 heads east over the Gladstone Branch near the New Providence station into Summit. In Summit, the road passes more homes before reaching a junction with CR 651, where the route briefly turns southeast onto Morris Avenue before continuing east onto Broad Street into commercial areas. CR 512 intersects CR 657 and passes the entrance to the Summit station on New Jersey Transit's Morris & Essex Lines before turning more to the southeast. The route curves to the northeast and passes through residential neighborhoods. CR 512 comes to its eastern terminus at an interchange with Route 24, with access to Route 124 and CR 527.

== Major intersections ==
County	Location	mi	km	Destinations	Notes
Hunterdon	Califon	0.00	0.00	CR 513 (High Bridge Road) to Route 31 – High Bridge, Long Valley	
Hunterdon	Tewksbury Township	4.42	7.11	CR 517 (Old Turnpike Road) – Long Valley, Oldwick	
Somerset	Peapack-Gladstone	10.13	16.30	US 206 – Somerville, Netcong	
Somerset	Far Hills	13.99	22.51	US 202 south – Somerville	Western terminus of US 202 overlap
Somerset	Far Hills	14.25	22.93	US 202 north – Morristown	Eastern terminus of US 202 overlap
Somerset	Bernards Township	18.50	29.77	CR 525 (Liberty Corner Road) – Martinsville	
Morris	Long Hill Township	24.68	39.72	CR 531 south (Mountain Avenue) to I-78	
Union	Summit	32.96	53.04	Route 24 / Route 124 / CR 527 to I-78	Exit 9A on Route 24
1.000 mi = 1.609 km; 1.000 km = 0.621 mi: Concurrency terminus
