= Stirling, New Jersey =

Populated place in Morris County, New Jersey, US

- Census-designated place
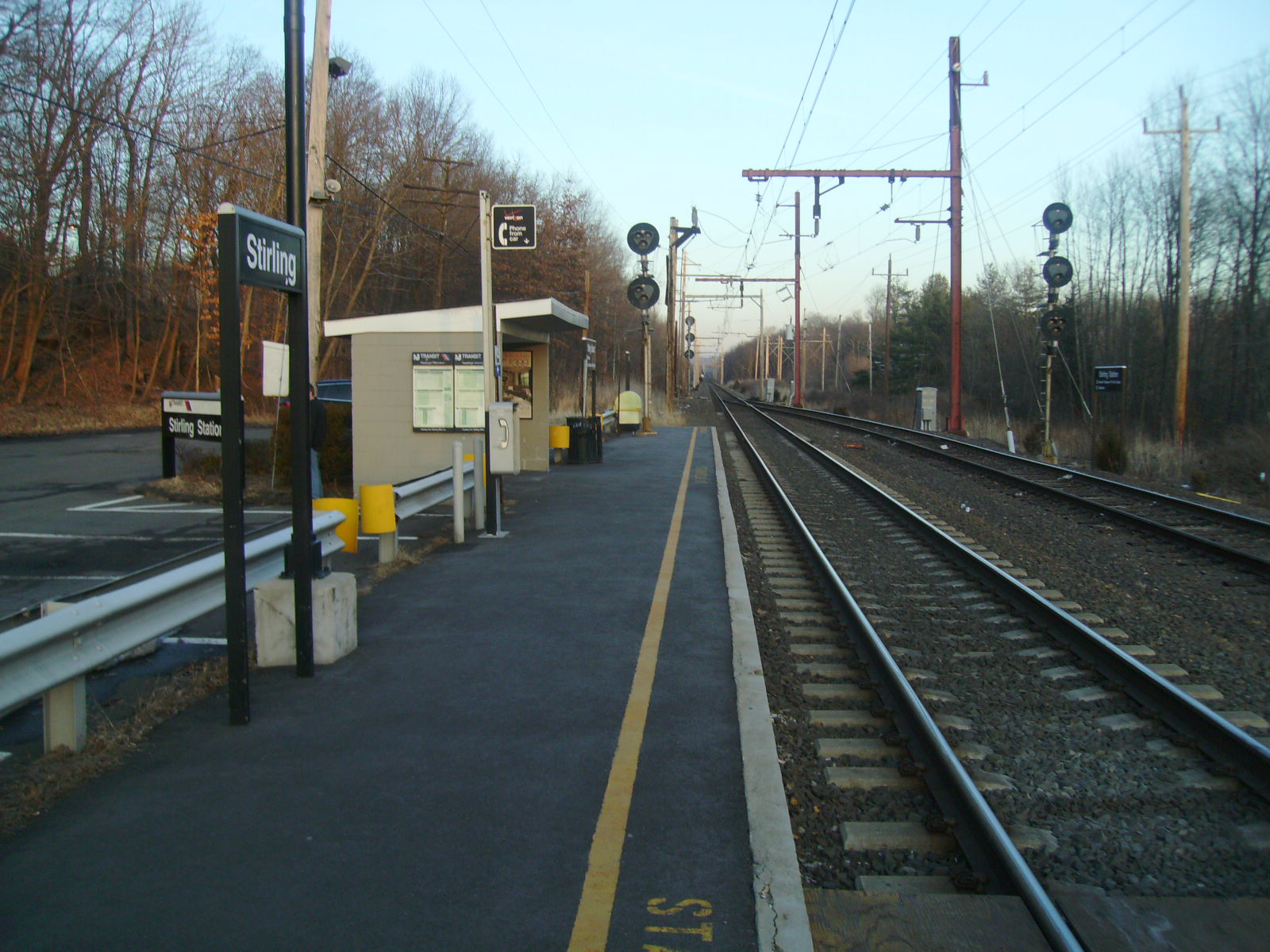
- Stirling Station facing NY Penn-bound

- Location in Morris County Location in New Jersey Location in the United States
- Coordinates: 40°40′19″N 74°29′42″W
- Country: United States
- State: New Jersey
- County: Morris
- Township: Long Hill
- Named for: William Alexander, Lord Stirling

Area
  - Total: 2.35 sq mi (6.09 km^{2})
  - Land: 2.34 sq mi (6.06 km^{2})
  - Water: 0.015 sq mi (0.04 km^{2})
- Elevation: 217 ft (66 m)

Population (2020)
  - Total: 2,555
  - Density: 1,092.8/sq mi (421.95/km^{2})
- ZIP Code: 07980
- FIPS code: 34-70920
- GNIS feature ID: 0880908

Stirling is an unincorporated community and census-designated place (CDP) in Long Hill Township, Morris County, New Jersey, United States. The area is served by the U.S. Postal Service ZIP Code 07980.

According to the 2020 census, the population was 2,555.

== History ==
Stirling was settled in 1740. A manufacturing and residential community was developed in the area of the railroad in the decades after the Civil War.

It was named by Fred Simpson Winston, who purchased about 500 acres (2.0 km^{2}) of land in the area for development. He named the area after William Alexander, Lord Stirling, an American Revolutionary War general who had owned 1,000 acres (4.0 km^{2}) of land lying on both sides of the Passaic River.

The Assyrian National School Association was established in Stirling in 1899 by Assyrian immigrants from Diyarbakır, Turkey.

== Geography ==
Stirling is in southeastern Morris County and occupies the central portion of Long Hill Township. It is bordered to the east by Gillette and to the west by Millington. The Passaic River forms the southern boundary of the community as well as the Somerset County line.

According to the U.S. Census Bureau, the Stirling CDP has a total area of 2.35 square miles (6.09 km^{2}), of which 0.02 square miles (0.05 km^{2}), or 0.64%, are water.

The Stirling train station is located along the Gladstone Branch of the New Jersey Transit Morristown Line.

== Demographics ==
Historical population
Census	Pop.	Note	%±
1950	1,076		—
1960	1,382		28.4%
2020	2,555		—
U.S. Decennial Census; 1950 1960 1970; 1980 1990 2000; 2010

Stirling was listed as an unincorporated community in the 1950 U.S. census and the 1960 U.S. census. It did not appear in subsequent censuses until it was again named a CDP in the 2020 U.S. census.

=== 2020 census ===
As of the 2020 census, Stirling had a population of 2,555. The median age was 42.4 years. 22.2% of residents were under the age of 18 and 16.2% of residents were 65 years of age or older. For every 100 females there were 94.6 males, and for every 100 females age 18 and over there were 92.6 males age 18 and over.

94.4% of residents lived in urban areas, while 5.6% lived in rural areas.

There were 925 households in Stirling, of which 37.3% had children under the age of 18 living in them. Of all households, 59.0% were married-couple households, 14.5% were households with a male householder and no spouse or partner present, and 21.9% were households with a female householder and no spouse or partner present. About 21.0% of all households were made up of individuals and 11.8% had someone living alone who was 65 years of age or older.

There were 954 housing units, of which 3.0% were vacant. The homeowner vacancy rate was 0.9% and the rental vacancy rate was 2.9%.

Stirling CDP, New Jersey – Racial and ethnic composition Note: the US Census treats Hispanic/Latino as an ethnic category. This table excludes Latinos from the racial categories and assigns them to a separate category. Hispanics/Latinos may be of any race.
Race / Ethnicity (NH = Non-Hispanic)	Pop 2020	2020
White alone (NH)	1,833	71.74%
Black or African American alone (NH)	40	1.57%
Native American or Alaska Native alone (NH)	1	0.04%
Asian alone (NH)	189	7.40%
Native Hawaiian or Pacific Islander alone (NH)	2	0.08%
Other race alone (NH)	27	1.06%
Mixed race or Multiracial (NH)	95	3.72%
Hispanic or Latino (any race)	368	14.40%
Total	2,555	100.00%

== Education ==
Stirling is home to Central Middle School, which is one of the four schools in the Long Hill Township School System. Central Middle School educates students from grades 6–8.

St. Vincent de Paul School was a Catholic school in Stirling that operated under the auspices of the Roman Catholic Diocese of Paterson. The school closed in June 2016 in the wake of declining enrollment and financial challenges. The school was recognized with the Blue Ribbon School Award of Excellence in 2012.

== Notable people ==
People who were born in, residents of, or otherwise closely associated with Stirling include:

- George Estock (1924–2010), Major League Baseball pitcher who played for the Boston Braves in 1951.
