= Clover Hill Swimming Club =

Swim club based in New Jersey, U.S.

Coordinates: 40°39′39″N 74°31′12″W

The Clover Hill Swimming Club, in the Millington section of Long Hill Township in Morris County, in the U.S. state of New Jersey, was a swim club operating in the 1960s in the suburban New York City metropolitan region.

Incorporated on October 6, 1961, the Clover Hill Swimming Club was a privately owned, for-profit corporation by constructing and operating "beach, swimming, tennis or recreation areas on the plan and form of a private membership club" in what was then called Passaic Township. When Clover Hill began operations in 1963, about 250 families had purchased memberships. The total zoned capacity of the built club was fixed at 400 families. During the period of construction and for some time thereafter, there was displayed at the entrance to Clover Hill an 8-by-4-foot (2.4 by 1.2 m) sign which read:

Clover Hill. On this 170 acre site a private family club with complete recreational facilities. Lake swimming, tennis, skating, golfing. For information write or call P.O. Box 222, Millington, N.J., Fr 7-0658, Millington 7-9779.

== Geography ==
The club was centered on a 3-acre (12,000 m^{2}) lake filled with water from the club's well. The lake bottom was covered with stones, with white sand covering the 300-foot (91 m) beach, extending out into the water. The lake had a 224-foot (68 m) dock and a deep water float. Bleachers overlooked 25 meter swim lanes. The club's swimming teams competed with other clubs. Other amenities typical of swim clubs, such as tennis facilities and a playground, were available. In the early 1990s the adjacent land was developed as a suburban neighborhood. The clubhouse was replaced by picnic facilities after it was torn down. As part of the neighborhood's development, the club's docks were also removed. The land and facilities of the old swim club are now managed by the neighborhood homeowner's association.

== Court case ==
The club was the defendant in a landmark 1966 civil rights case, Clover Hill Swimming Club v. Robert F. Goldsboro. The club was sued by an African American veterinarian who said he was denied membership because of his race. The club claimed that because it was private, the Law of Discrimination did not apply and therefore it could pick its own membership, despite the fact that the club advertised at the entrance to Clover Hill and in newspapers that it had a policy of open membership. After the Clover Hill Swimming Club appealed the first decision, the Supreme Court of New Jersey again sided with the plaintiff.
