= J. K. Apgar Farmhouse =

Historic house in New Jersey, United States

- U.S. National Register of Historic Places
- New Jersey Register of Historic Places
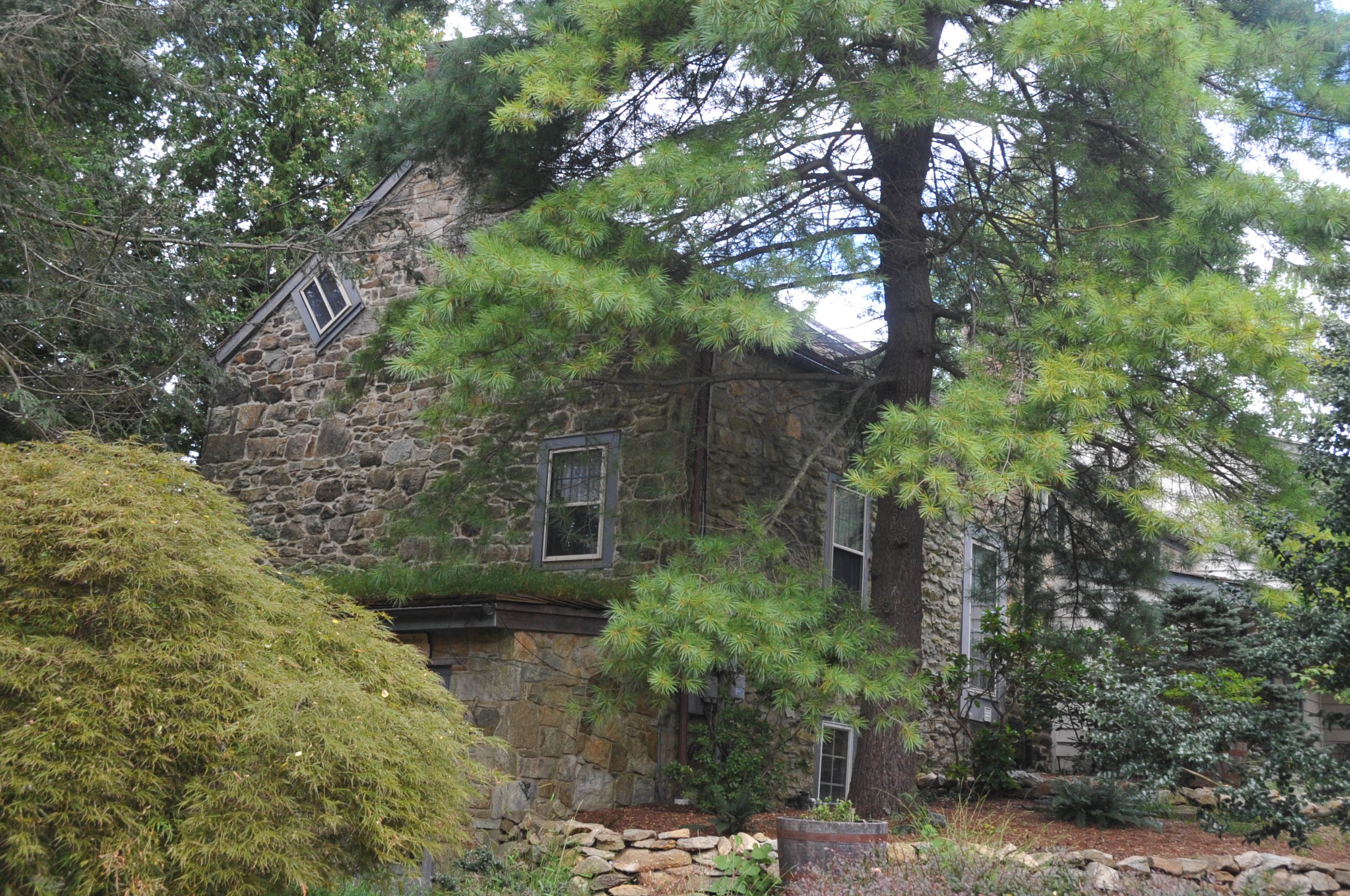

- Location within Hunterdon County, New Jersey Location within New Jersey Location within the United States
- Location: Academy Street (CR 512) and Guinea Hollow Road; Califon, New Jersey
- Coordinates: 40°42′59″N 74°49′38″W
- Area: 5.8 acres (2.3 ha)
- NRHP reference No.: 79001494
- NJRHP No.: 1564

Significant dates
- Added to NRHP: November 1, 1979
- Designated NJRHP: July 21, 1979

The J. K. Apgar Farmhouse is a historic stone house located at the intersection of Academy Street (CR 512) and Guinea Hollow Road in Califon in Hunterdon County, New Jersey. It was added to the National Register of Historic Places on November 1, 1979, for its significance in architecture.

== History ==
The J. K. Apgar Farmhouse was constructed in two major sections. The oldest section of the house was built in the 18th century, and the original owner and architect are unknown. The newer part of the house was constructed by J.K. Apgar in 1833. The house exemplifies the stone farmhouses constructed in Hunterdon County during this time period. The house is also notable for its unusually placed windows on its western face; locals referred to it as the "cock-eyed house" due to the way the two windows align with the roof pitch. At the time of its nomination, it was one of the five oldest extant buildings in Califon. The nomination form noted that some modern elements had been added to the farmhouse and its grounds; there were a few modern outbuildings, and a one-story wing was added to the farmhouse in the 1970s.

== See also ==
- National Register of Historic Places listings in Hunterdon County, New Jersey
