= Jack H. Jacobs =

American Vietnam War veteran

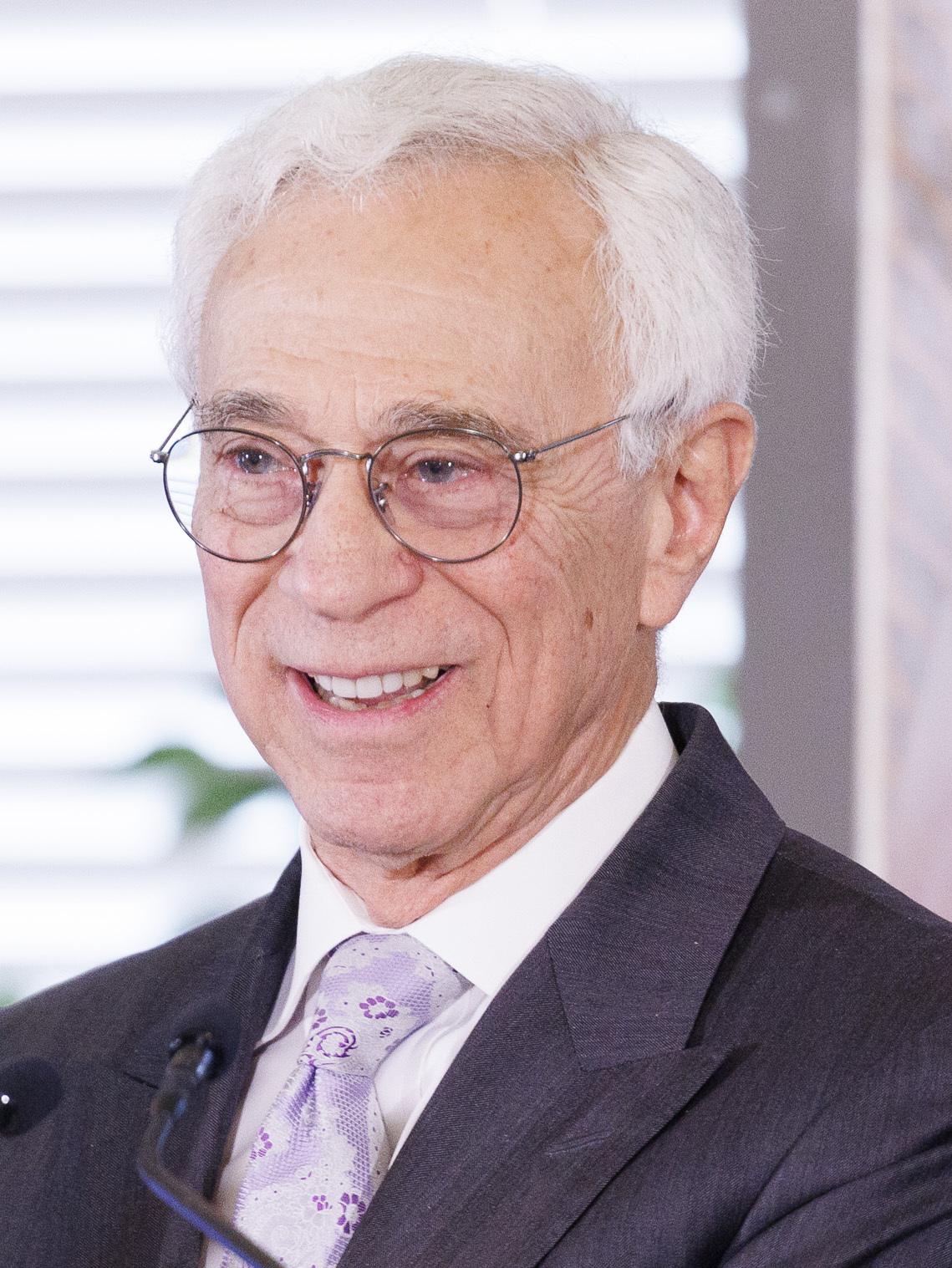
- Born: August 2, 1945 (age 81); Brooklyn, New York, U.S.
- Military career
- Allegiance: United States
- Branch: United States Army
- Service years: 1966–1987
- Rank: Colonel
- Units: 505th Infantry Regiment, 82nd Airborne Division
- Conflicts: Vietnam War
- Awards: Medal of Honor; Silver Star (2); Legion of Merit; Bronze Star Medal (3); Purple Heart (2)
- Other work: Bankers Trust; Council on Foreign Relations; Medal of Honor Foundation; NBC/MSNBC military analyst

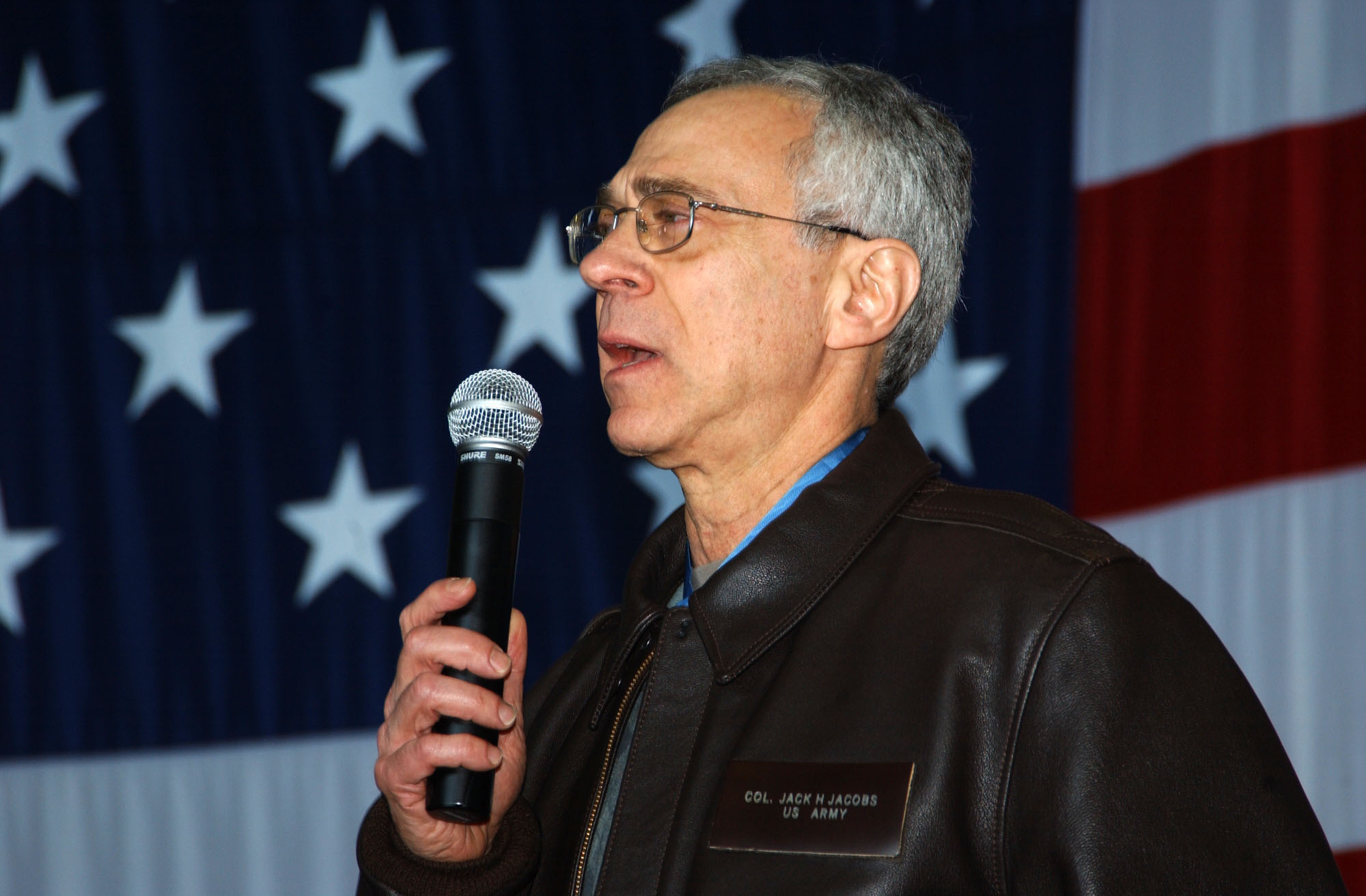
Jack H. Jacobs aboard USS Theodore Roosevelt, December 2005

Jack Howard Jacobs (born August 2, 1945) is a retired colonel in the United States Army and a Medal of Honor recipient for his actions during the Vietnam War. He serves as a military analyst for NBC News and MS NOW and previously worked as an investment manager.

== Early life ==
Born on August 2, 1945, in Brooklyn, New York, Jacobs lived in Queens near LaGuardia Airport. He was born into a Jewish family. His paternal grandparents emigrated from Greece, while his maternal grandparents were from Poland and Romania. As a child, he moved with his family to Woodbridge Township, New Jersey, in the mid-1950s and in 1962 graduated from Woodbridge High School.

Jacobs then attended Rutgers University, where he earned both Bachelor of Arts and Master of Arts degrees. A member of the school's Army Reserve Officer Training Corps program, he entered military service as a second lieutenant in 1966.

== Military service ==
In the course of his military career, Jacobs served as a platoon leader in the 82nd Airborne Division, a battalion executive officer in the 7th Infantry Division, and a battalion commander with the 10th Infantry Regiment in Panama. He spent two tours of duty in Vietnam, both times as an advisor to infantry units in the Army of the Republic of Vietnam (ARVN).

In his first deployment to Vietnam, Jacobs served as a first lieutenant with Military Assistance Command, Vietnam, in Kien Phong Province, part of the Mekong Delta region. By March 9, 1968, he was working as the assistant battalion advisor for the ARVN's 2nd Battalion, 16th Infantry Regiment, 9th Infantry Division. During a mission on that day, the 2nd Battalion came under intense fire from an entrenched Viet Cong force. As Jacobs called in air support from his position with the leading company, the company commander was disabled and the unit became disorganized due to heavy casualties.

Although wounded himself by mortar fragments to the head and arms, Jacobs took command of the company and ordered a withdrawal and the establishment of a defense line at a more secure position. Despite impaired vision caused by his injuries, he repeatedly ran across open rice paddies through heavy fire to evacuate the wounded, personally saving a fellow advisor, the wounded company commander, and twelve other allied soldiers. Three times during these trips he encountered Viet Cong squads, which he single-handedly dispersed. He was subsequently promoted to captain and awarded the Medal of Honor. The medal was formally presented to him by President Richard Nixon.

In addition to the Medal of Honor, Jacobs received two Silver Stars, three Bronze Star Medals, and two Purple Hearts in Vietnam. In his memoir, Jacobs recounts that he had to use subterfuge to return to a combat role in Vietnam after being awarded the Medal of Honor, as the military was unwilling to assign Medal of Honor recipients to combat roles.

Jacobs was a faculty member at the United States Military Academy in West Point, teaching international relations and comparative politics for three years, from 1973 to 1976, and at the National War College in Washington, D.C. He retired from the army in 1987 as a colonel.

== Business career and later life ==
After his military retirement, Jacobs began a career in investment banking. He founded and was chief operating officer of AutoFinance Group, Inc., which dealt in the securitization of debt instruments. The company was later sold to KeyBank. He next worked as a managing director of Bankers Trust, overseeing the firm's foreign exchange options and being involved in the institutional hedge fund business until leaving the company in 1996. Jacobs is a principal in The Fitzroy Group, an investment and residential real estate development organization which operates in London. He is also on the board of directors for several smaller corporations.

Jacobs maintains involvement in several military-related organizations. He is vice chairman of the Medal of Honor Foundation, a member of the board of trustees for the National World War II Museum, and holds the McDermott Chair of Politics at the U.S. Military Academy.

In October 2008, the Penguin Group published Jacobs' memoir, If Not Now, When?: Duty and Sacrifice In America's Time of Need, coauthored with New York Times best-selling author, Douglas Century, with a foreword by NBC Nightly News anchor and managing editor Brian Williams. The book won the 2010 Colby Award, recognizing a "first work of fiction or nonfiction that has made a significant contribution to the public's understanding of intelligence operations, military history, or international affairs."

In May 2012, Thomas Dunne Books published Jacobs' Basic: Surviving Boot Camp and Basic Training, co-written with David Fisher. The book is a history of the American military's basic training told mainly through oral histories of those who have gone through Army, Navy, Marine and Air Force initial training.

Jacobs is also a military analyst for NBC/MSNBC. In 2009, he appeared on The Colbert Report as part of the Doom Bunker segment. He currently serves on the board of advisors of the Code of Support Foundation, a nonprofit military service organization.

Jacobs is married to Sue Jacobs, has a grown daughter and two sons, and lives in Far Hills, New Jersey. He has also been a resident of the Millington section of Long Hill Township, New Jersey.

In 2016, Jacobs was inducted into the New Jersey Hall of Fame. In 2018, Jacobs delivered the Waldo Family Lecture on International Relations at Old Dominion University in Norfolk, Virginia.

Jacobs serves as the Chair of the Veterans Advancement Program at the New York Film Academy, supporting veterans pursuing careers in film, media, and the visual arts. He is also a member of the Board of Trustees of the 10 ARTS Foundation, a nonprofit organization dedicated to fostering creativity and opportunity in the visual and performing arts for NYFA students and alum.

== Awards and decorations ==
=== Medal of Honor ===
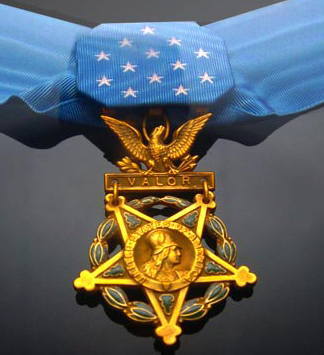

Jack Howard Jacobs
Rank and organization: Captain (Then First Lieutenant), U.S. Army, Army Element, U.S. Military Assistance Command
Place and date: Kien Phong Province, Republic of Vietnam, March 9, 1968
Entered service at: Trenton, Mercer County, New Jersey
Born: August 2, 1945, Brooklyn, New York

Citation:

For conspicuous gallantry and intrepidity in action at the risk of his life above and beyond the call of duty. Capt. Jacobs (then 1st Lt.), Infantry, distinguished himself while serving as assistant battalion advisor, 2d Battalion, 16th Infantry, 9th Infantry Division, Army of the Republic of Vietnam. The 2d Battalion was advancing to contact when it came under intense heavy machine gun and mortar fire from a Viet Cong battalion positioned in well fortified bunkers. As the 2d Battalion deployed into attack formation its advance was halted by devastating fire. Capt. Jacobs, with the command element of the lead company, called for and directed air strikes on the enemy positions to facilitate a renewed attack. Due to the intensity of the enemy fire and heavy casualties to the command group, including the company commander, the attack stopped and the friendly troops became disorganized. Although wounded by mortar fragments, Capt. Jacobs assumed command of the allied company, ordered a withdrawal from the exposed position and established a defensive perimeter. Despite profuse bleeding from head wounds which impaired his vision, Capt. Jacobs, with complete disregard for his safety, returned under intense fire to evacuate a seriously wounded advisor to the safety of a wooded area where he administered lifesaving first aid. He then returned through heavy automatic weapons fire to evacuate the wounded company commander. Capt. Jacobs made repeated trips across the fire-swept open rice paddies evacuating wounded and their weapons. On 3 separate occasions, Capt. Jacobs contacted and drove off Viet Cong squads who were searching for allied wounded and weapons, single-handedly killing 3 and wounding several others. His gallant actions and extraordinary heroism saved the lives of 1 U.S. advisor and 13 allied soldiers. Through his effort the allied company was restored to an effective fighting unit and prevented defeat of the friendly forces by a strong and determined enemy. Capt. Jacobs, by his gallantry and bravery in action in the highest traditions of the military service, has reflected great credit upon himself, his unit, and the U.S. Army.

=== Commendations ===

Badge	Combat Infantryman Badge		
1st row	Medal of Honor	Silver Star with 1 bronze Oak leaf cluster (2 awards)	Legion of Merit
2nd row	Bronze Star Medal with "V" device and 2 Oak leaf clusters (3 awards, 1 with valor)	Purple Heart with 1 Oak leaf cluster (2 awards)	Meritorious Service Medal
3rd row	Air Medal	Army Commendation Medal	National Defense Service Medal
4th row	Vietnam Service Medal with 4 bronze Campaign stars	Army Service Ribbon	Overseas Service Ribbon
5th row	Vietnam Cross of Gallantry with palm	Vietnam Staff Service Medal (First class)	Republic of Vietnam Campaign Medal with "60-" clasp
Badge	Basic Parachutist Badge		

== See also ==
- List of Medal of Honor recipients for the Vietnam War
- List of Jewish Medal of Honor recipients
