= Jessie Baylin =

American singer

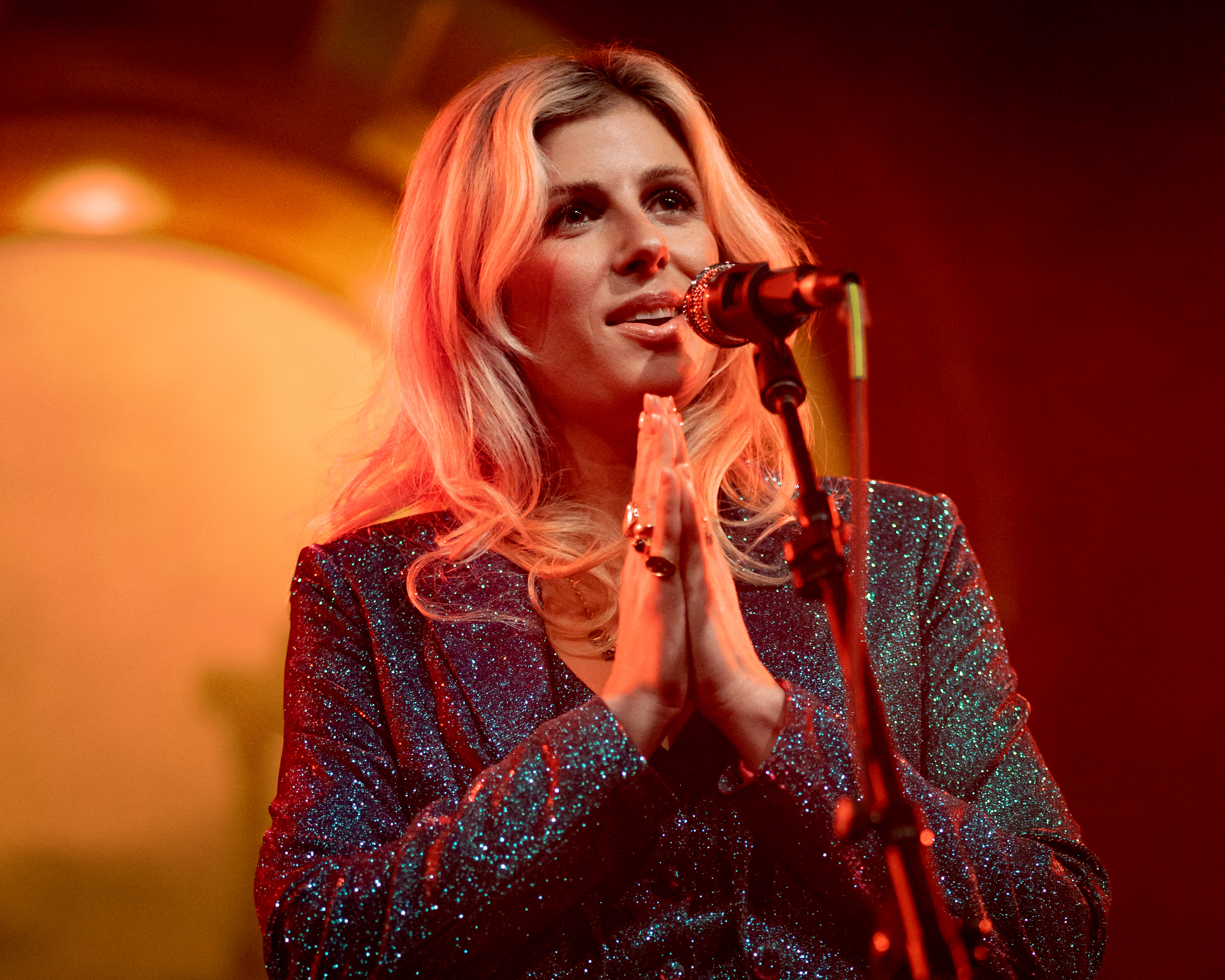
- Jessie Baylin in 2023

Background information
- Born: Jessica Baldassarre
- Origin: Gillette, New Jersey, U.S.
- Genres: Folk
- Occupations: Singer; songwriter
- Instruments: Vocals; guitar
- Label: Blonde Rat Records
- Website: www.jessiebaylin.com

Jessica Baldassarre, known professionally as Jessie Baylin, is a Nashville-based singer and songwriter.

== Career ==
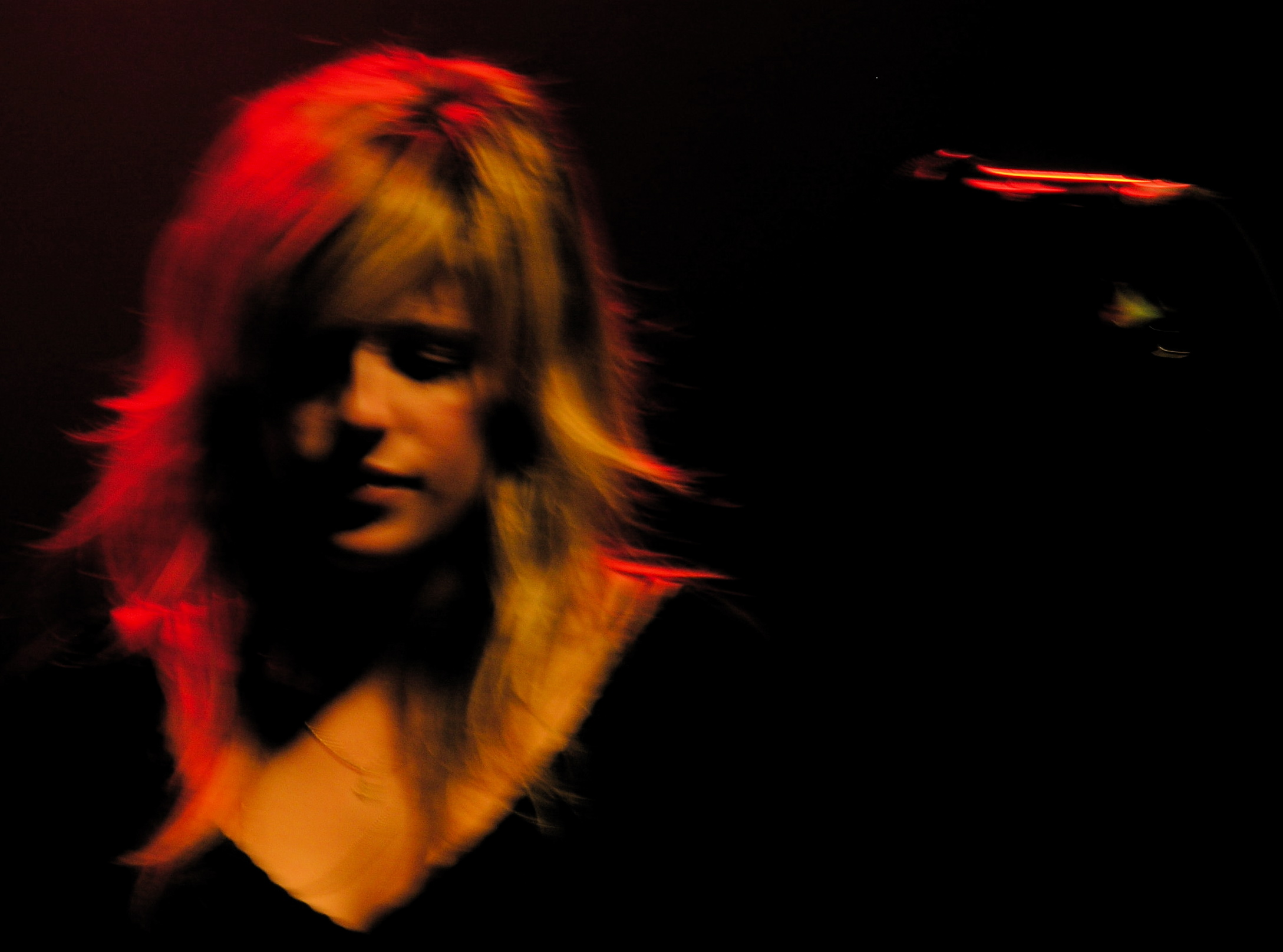
Baylin opens for James Morrison at Toronto's Mod Club Theatre, April 5, 2007

Her album Firesight was written by Baylin, Jesse Harris, Mike Daly, Mark Goldenberg, Greg Wells and Danny Wilde, and was produced and engineered by Roger Moutenot.

== Personal life ==
Baylin is married to Nathan Followill, the drummer for Kings of Leon. The two were married on November 14, 2009 in Brentwood, Tennessee at the Wolf Den Farm. She gave birth to their daughter, Violet Marlowe Followill, on December 26, 2012. Baylin moved to Nashville, Tennessee to live with her husband.

== Discography ==
- You
- Firesight (2008)
- Little Spark (2012)
- Thorns (2012)
- Dark Place (2015)
- Strawberry Wind (2018)
- Jersey Girl (2022)
