= Millington, New Jersey =

Place in Morris County, New Jersey, United States

- Census-designated place
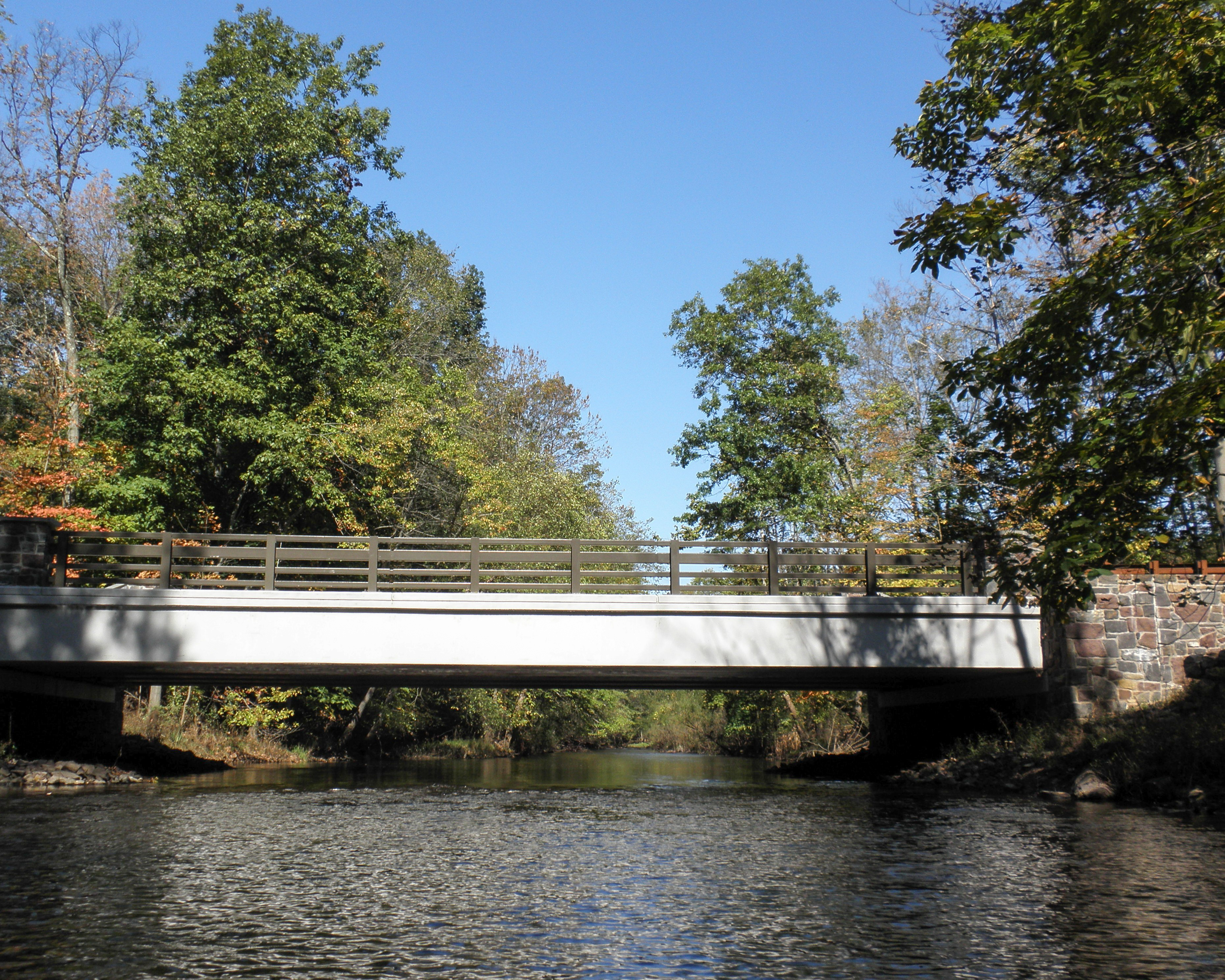
- Stone House Bridge Road over the Passaic River, connecting Millington in Morris County to Bernards Township in Somerset County

- Location in Morris County Location in New Jersey Location in the United States
- Coordinates: 40°40′38″N 74°31′04″W
- Country: United States
- State: New Jersey
- County: Morris
- Township: Long Hill

Area
  - Total: 2.62 sq mi (6.79 km^{2})
  - Land: 2.60 sq mi (6.74 km^{2})
  - Water: 0.019 sq mi (0.05 km^{2})

Population (2020)
  - Total: 3,038
  - Density: 1,166.9/sq mi (450.55/km^{2})
- Time zone: Eastern (EST)
- ZIP Code: 07946
- Area code: 908
- FIPS code: 34-46470

Millington is an unincorporated community and census-designated place (CDP) in Long Hill Township, Morris County, New Jersey, United States. As of the 2020 United States census, the CDP's population was 3,038.

== Geography ==
Millington is in southernmost Morris County, in the western part of Long Hill Township. It is bordered to the west by the Passaic River, which forms the Somerset County line. It is bordered to the east by Stirling within Long Hill Township. Millington is served as United States Postal Service ZIP Code 07946.

Millington borders the southern side of the Great Swamp National Wildlife Refuge, with access to Lord Stirling Park across the Passaic River. The Raptor Trust, a famous bird rehabilitation and education center within the Great Swamp, is also inside the town limits.

== History ==
Clover Hill Swimming Club was located in Millington. The club lost a 1966 civil rights case, Clover Hill Swimming Club v. Robert F. Goldsboro. The club was sued by an African American veterinarian who said he was denied membership because of his race. The club claimed that because it was private, the Law of Discrimination did not apply and therefore it could pick its own membership. After the Clover Hill Swimming Club appealed the first decision, the Supreme Court of New Jersey again sided with the plaintiff.

== Demographics ==
Historical population
Census	Pop.	Note	%±
1960	1,182		—
2020	3,038		—
U.S. Decennial Census; 1950 1960 1970; 1980 1990 2000; 2010 2020

Millington was listed as an unincorporated community in the 1960 U.S. census; the community did not appear again in the U.S. census until it was listed as a census designated place in the 2020 U.S. census.

=== 2020 census ===
As of the 2020 census, Millington had a population of 3,038. The median age was 45.1 years. 22.3% of residents were under the age of 18 and 17.6% of residents were 65 years of age or older. For every 100 females there were 96.4 males, and for every 100 females age 18 and over there were 95.6 males age 18 and over.

97.8% of residents lived in urban areas, while 2.2% lived in rural areas.

There were 1,071 households in Millington, of which 34.5% had children under the age of 18 living in them. Of all households, 69.8% were married-couple households, 8.9% were households with a male householder and no spouse or partner present, and 17.3% were households with a female householder and no spouse or partner present. About 17.1% of all households were made up of individuals and 10.5% had someone living alone who was 65 years of age or older.

There were 1,107 housing units, of which 3.3% were vacant. The homeowner vacancy rate was 1.0% and the rental vacancy rate was 4.5%.

Millington CDP, New Jersey – Racial and ethnic composition Note: the US Census treats Hispanic/Latino as an ethnic category. This table excludes Latinos from the racial categories and assigns them to a separate category. Hispanics/Latinos may be of any race.
Race / Ethnicity (NH = Non-Hispanic)	Pop 2020	2020
White alone (NH)	2,399	78.97%
Black or African American alone (NH)	15	0.49%
Native American or Alaska Native alone (NH)	2	0.07%
Asian alone (NH)	257	8.46%
Native Hawaiian or Pacific Islander alone (NH)	0	0.00%
Other race alone (NH)	25	0.82%
Mixed race or Multiracial (NH)	115	3.79%
Hispanic or Latino (any race)	225	7.41%
Total	3,038	100.00%

=== 2010 census ===
As of the 2010 census, the population for ZIP Code Tabulation Area 07946, which includes areas outside of the present CDP, was 3,144.

== Education ==
Students in public school attend the Long Hill Township School System for grades K-8 and attend Watchung Hills Regional High School in Somerset County for grades 9-12. Millington School is the only active school still located in the town. It houses grades 2-5 and had an enrollment of 505 students as of the 2005-06 school year.

The Town Hall used to be used as the old school house of the town, originally built in the 19th century.

== Infrastructure ==
=== Rail ===
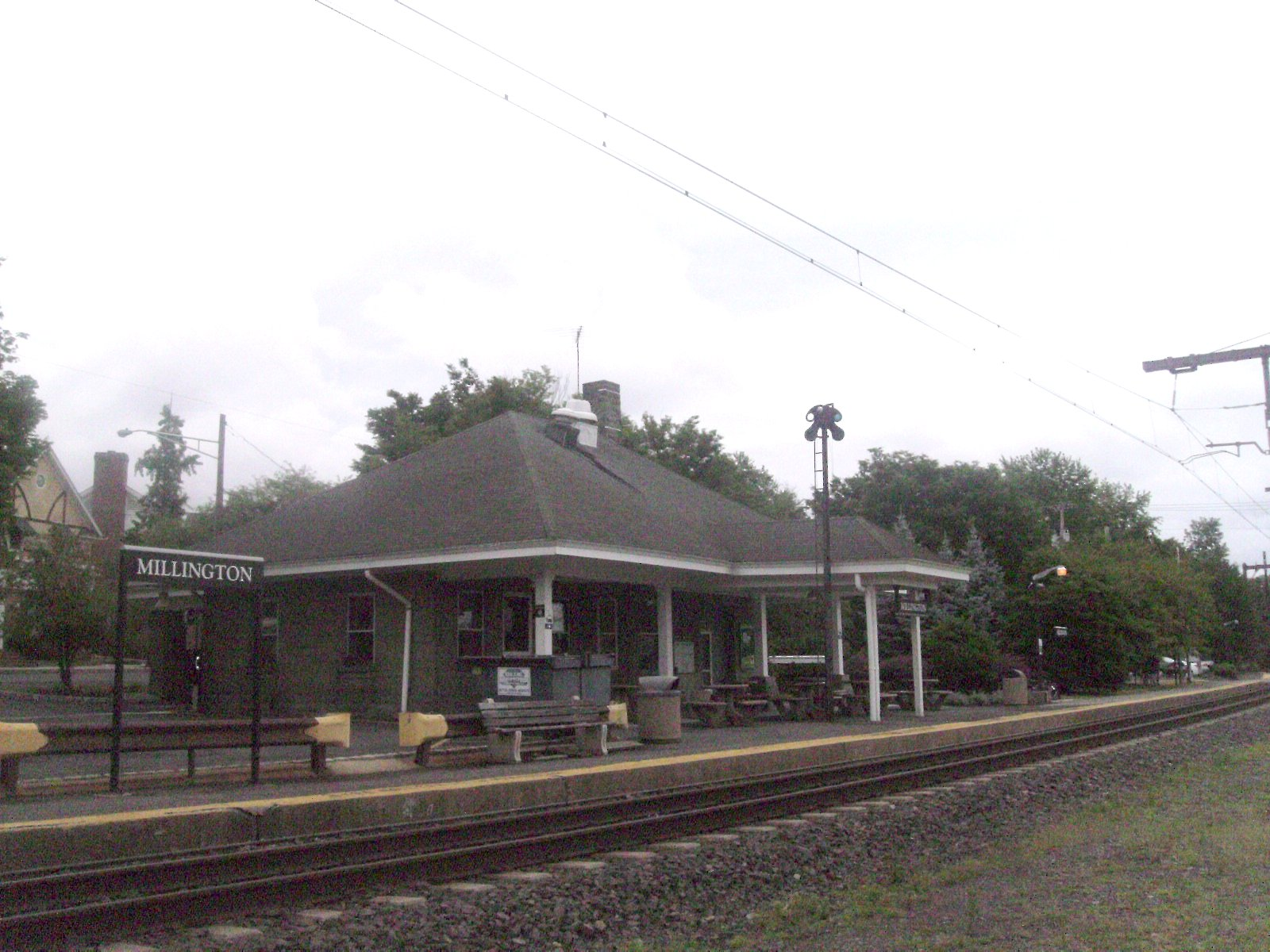
The Millington Station, served by New Jersey Transit rail

The town has a train stop on the Gladstone Branch of the NJ Transit rail line, Millington Station. Millington Station was built in 1901, after the West Line Railroad was extended from Summit to Bernardsville during the years 1870–71. Millington Station was entered into the National Register of Historic Places on June 22, 1984. Another building on the register is the Boyle/Hudspeth-Benson House. See List of Registered Historic Places in Morris County, New Jersey for other examples in the area.

== Economy ==
Garden State Fireworks, founded in 1890, is located there.

Millington Savings Bank started as Millington Building and Loan in 1911 in the town and has grown to other branches in the area.

== Notable people ==
People who were born in, residents of, or otherwise closely associated with Millington include:

- Jack H. Jacobs (born 1945), Medal of Honor recipient in 1969 for his heroic actions during the Vietnam War
- Robert Tappan Morris (born 1965), computer scientist and entrepreneur best known for creating the Morris Worm in 1988, considered the first computer worm on the Internet
- Bill Murray (born 1997), defensive tackle for the New England Patriots
- Keith Sims (born 1967), former professional football offensive lineman who played in the NFL for the Miami Dolphins and Washington Redskins

== Gallery ==
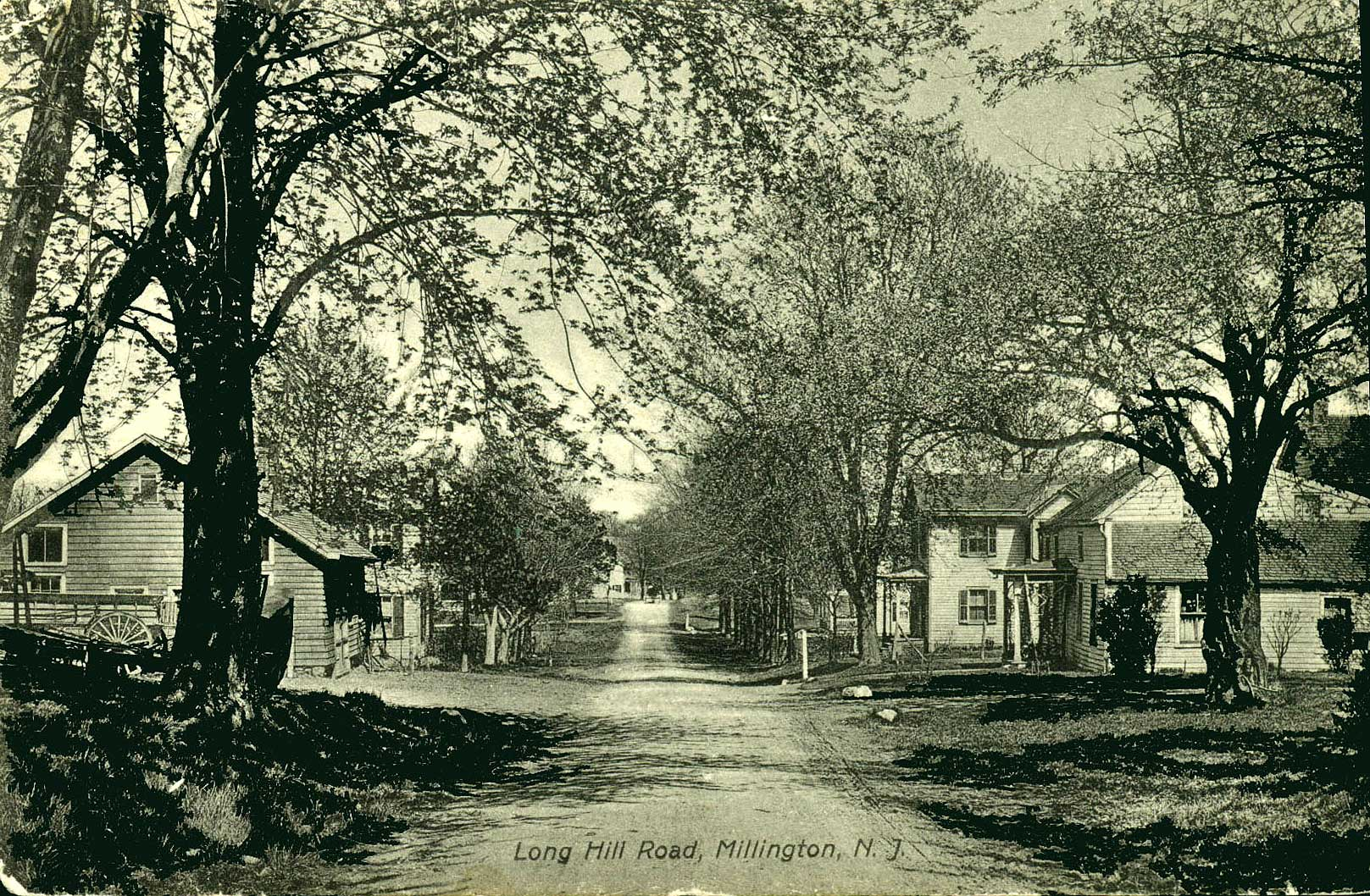
Long Hill Road in Millington, New Jersey, 1908.

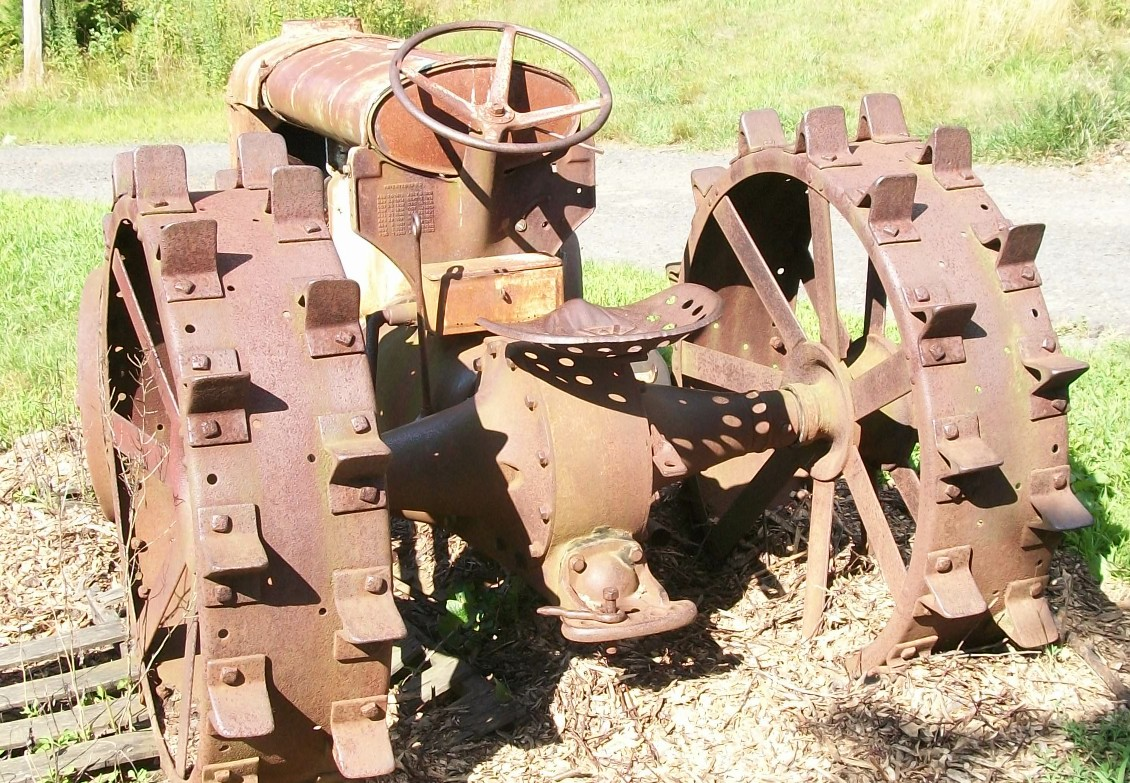
Hillview Farms has new tractors, but when old tractors become obsolete, they are kept as historical pieces.
