= Long Hill Township School System =

School district in Morris County, New Jersey

Address
- 759 Valley Road Gillette, Morris County, New Jersey, 07933; United States
- Coordinates: 40.672848°N 74.46978°W

District information
- Grades: PreK-8
- Superintendent: Anne Mucci
- Business administrator: Daniel A. Borgo (interim)
- Schools: 3

Students and staff
- Enrollment: 894 (as of 2019–20)
- Faculty: 80.6 FTEs
- Student–teacher ratio: 11.1:1

Other information
- District Factor Group: I
- Website: www.longhill.org
Ind.	Per pupil	District spending	Rank (*)	K-8 average	%± vs. average
1A	Total Spending	$20,365	79	$18,891	7.8%
1	Budgetary Cost	15,958	78	14,159	12.7%
2	Classroom Instruction	8,946	58	8,659	3.3%
6	Support Services	3,236	82	2,167	49.3%
8	Administrative Cost	1,740	64	1,547	12.5%
10	Operations & Maintenance	2,025	78	1,612	25.6%
13	Extracurricular Activities	12	4	104	−88.5%
16	Median Teacher Salary	65,988	69	61,136
Data from NJDoE 2014 Taxpayers' Guide to Education Spending. *Of K-8 districts with more than 750 students. Lowest spending=1; Highest=84

The Long Hill Township School System is a community public school district that serves students in pre-kindergarten through eighth grade in Long Hill Township in Morris County, in the U.S. state of New Jersey.

As of the 2019–20 school year, the district, comprising three schools, had an enrollment of 894 students and 80.6 classroom teachers (on an FTE basis), for a student–teacher ratio of 11.1:1.

The district is classified by the New Jersey Department of Education as being in District Factor Group "I", the second-highest of eight groupings. District Factor Groups organize districts statewide to allow comparison by common socioeconomic characteristics of the local districts. From lowest socioeconomic status to highest, the categories are A, B, CD, DE, FG, GH, I and J.

Long Hill Township's high school students in public school for ninth through twelfth grades attend Watchung Hills Regional High School in Warren Township. Students from Long Hill Township and from the neighboring communities of Green Brook Township (through sending/receiving relationship), Warren Township and Watchung (in Somerset County) attend the school. As of the 2019–20 school year, the high school had an enrollment of 1,948 students and 160.6 classroom teachers (on an FTE basis), for a student–teacher ratio of 12.1:1.

== Schools ==
Schools in the district (with 2019–20 enrollment data from the National Center for Education Statistics) are:

Elementary schools

- Gillette School with 223 students in grades PreK-1
  - Lori Jones, principal
- Millington School with 397 students in grades 2-5
  - Jennifer S. Dawson, principal

Middle school

- Central Middle School with 269 students in grades 6-8
  - Michael Viturello, principal

== Administration ==
Core members of the district's administration are:

- Anne Mucci, superintendent
- Daniel A. Borgo, interim business administrator and board secretary

== Board of education ==
The district's board of education is composed of nine members who set policy and oversee the fiscal and educational operation of the district through its administration. As a Type II school district, the board's trustees are elected directly by voters to serve three-year terms of office on a staggered basis, with three seats up for election each year held (since 2012) as part of the November general election. The board appoints a superintendent to oversee the district's day-to-day operations and a business administrator to supervise the business functions of the district.
