= Bill Murray (offensive lineman) =

American football player (born 1997)

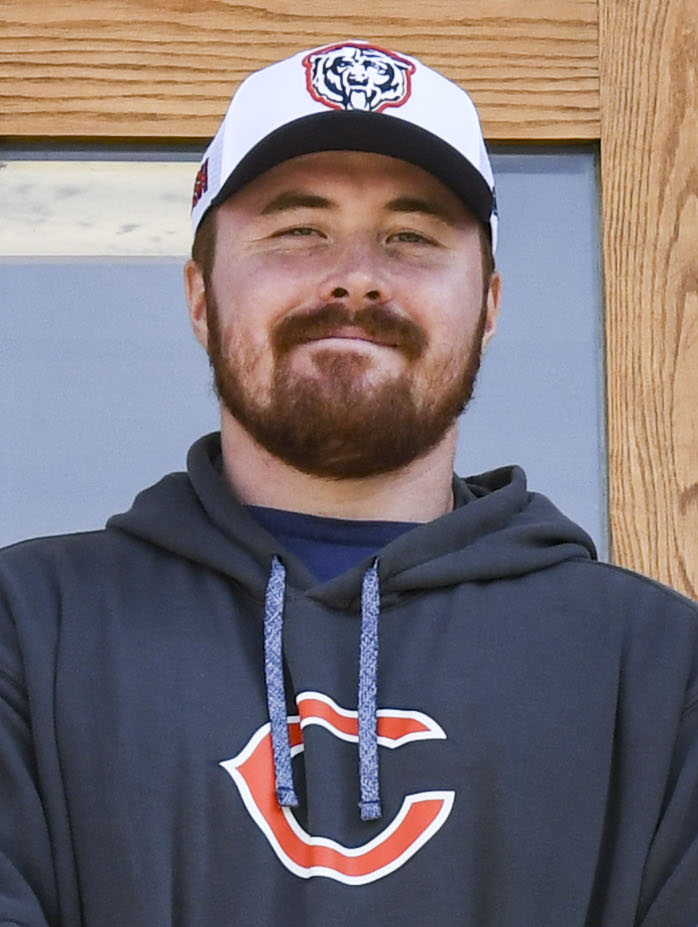
- Murray with the Chicago Bears in 2024

No. 66 – Los Angeles Rams
- Position: Guard
- Roster status: Active

Personal information
- Born: July 3, 1997 (age 29); Millington, New Jersey, U.S.
- Listed height: 6 ft 4 in (1.93 m)
- Listed weight: 321 lb (146 kg)

Career information
- High school: Delbarton School (Morristown, New Jersey)
- College: William & Mary (2015–2019)
- NFL draft: 2020: undrafted

Career history
- New England Patriots (2020–2023); Chicago Bears (2023–2024); New England Patriots (2025)*; Indianapolis Colts (2025)*; Los Angeles Rams (2026–present)
- * Offseason or practice squad member only

Awards and highlights
- FCS All-American (2019); 2x Second-team All-CAA (2018, 2019)

Career NFL statistics as of 2024
- Games played: 4
- Stats at Pro Football Reference

Bill Murray (born July 3, 1997) is an American professional football guard for the Los Angeles Rams of the National Football League (NFL). He played college football for the William & Mary Tribe.

== Early life ==
Bill was born in Millington, New Jersey to Doug and Alison Murray. At the Delbarton School, Murray played both football and lacrosse. Following his high school success, Murray committed to William & Mary.

== College career ==
At William & Mary, Murray was a two-time All-Colonial Athletic Association selection and a three-year starter who finished his career with 143 tackles, 19 sacks, 10 blocks, four forced fumbles, two fumble recoveries, and six passes defended. Murray was a two-year letter winner and served as a team captain as a senior.

== Professional career ==
Pre-draft measurables
Height	Weight	Arm length	Hand span	Wingspan
6 ft 3 5/8 in (1.92 m)	300 lb (136 kg)	32 7/8 in (0.84 m)	10 1/4 in (0.26 m)	6 ft 7 3/4 in (2.03 m)
All values from Pro Day

=== New England Patriots ===
Following his senior year, Murray signed with the New England Patriots as an undrafted free agent in 2020. He spent his entire rookie season on the team's practice squad.

On August 31, 2021, Murray was waived by the Patriots and re-signed to the practice squad.

On February 7, 2022, Murray signed a reserve/future contract. On July 25, Murray converted from defensive tackle to guard. He was waived on August 30, and signed to the practice squad the next day. He signed a reserve/future contract with New England on January 24, 2023. Murray was released by the Patriots on August 29.

=== Chicago Bears ===
On August 31, 2023, Murray was signed to the Chicago Bears' practice squad. He signed a reserve/future contract with Chicago on January 8, 2024.

On April 8, 2025, Murray signed his exclusive rights free agent contract with the Bears. He was waived on August 26 with an injury designation.

=== New England Patriots (second stint) ===
On November 25, 2025, Murray was signed to the New England Patriots' practice squad. The Patriots released Murray on December 8.

=== Indianapolis Colts ===
On December 16, 2025, Murray was signed to the Indianapolis Colts' practice squad. He signed a reserve/future contract with Indianapolis on January 5, 2026.

On April 30, 2026, Murray was released by the Colts.

=== Los Angeles Rams ===
On July 27, 2026, Murray signed with the Los Angeles Rams.
