= Gillette, New Jersey =

Place in Morris County, New Jersey, United States

- Census-designated place
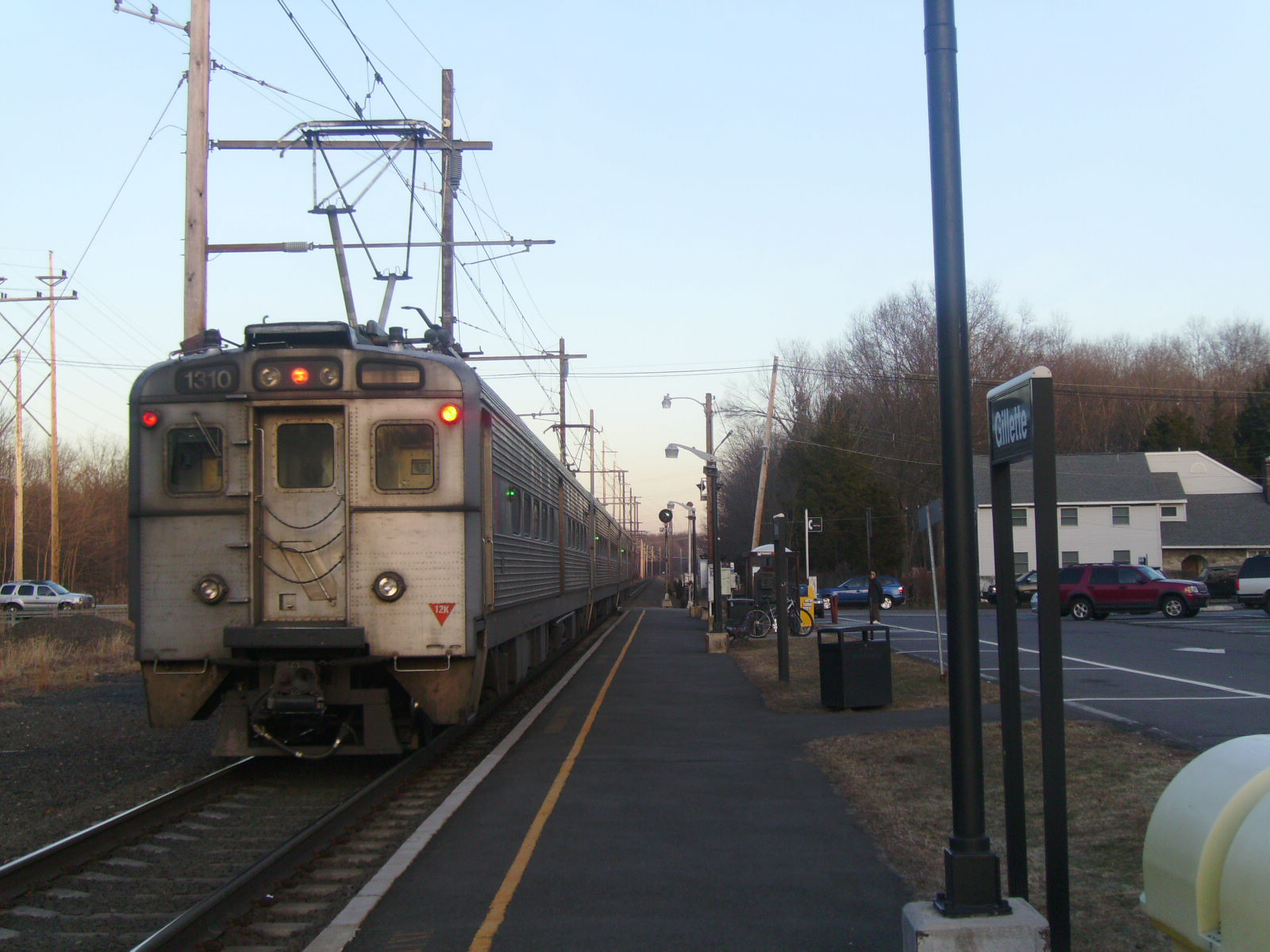
- NJ Transit commuter train to Manhattan

- Location in Morris County Location in New Jersey Location in the United States
- Coordinates: 40°40′26″N 74°27′58″W
- Country: United States
- State: New Jersey
- County: Morris
- Township: Long Hill

Area
  - Total: 4.46 sq mi (11.56 km^{2})
  - Land: 4.32 sq mi (11.20 km^{2})
  - Water: 0.14 sq mi (0.37 km^{2})
- Elevation: 230 ft (70 m)

Population (2020)
  - Total: 2,956
  - Density: 683.7/sq mi (263.99/km^{2})
- ZIP Code: 07933
- FIPS code: 34-26220
- GNIS feature ID: 0876612

Gillette is an unincorporated community and census-designated place (CDP) in Long Hill Township, Morris County, New Jersey, United States. The area is served as United States Postal Service ZIP Code 07933. As of the 2020 United States census, the CDP had a population of 2,956.

== Geography ==
Gillette is in southern Morris County, in the eastern third of Long Hill Township. It is bordered to the west by Stirling, also within Long Hill Township; to the north by Harding Township; and to the east by Chatham Township. The community's southern border is the Passaic River, across which is Union County to the southeast and Somerset County to the southwest.

The unincorporated community of Gillette is in the southern part of the Gillette CDP; Meyersville is in the northern part. The two settled areas are separated by Long Hill, summit elevation 450 feet (137 m), which rises about 200 feet (61 m) above the neighboring valleys. Morristown, the county seat, is 10 miles (16 km) to the north, while downtown Newark is 17 miles (27 km) to the east. Interstate 78 passes less than 2 miles (3 km) to the south of Gillette, with access from Exit 40, Hillcrest Road.

According to the U.S. Census Bureau, the Gillette CDP has a total area of 4.465 square miles (11.564 km^{2}), of which 4.323 square miles (11.197 km^{2}) are land and 0.142 square miles (0.368 km^{2}), or 3.18%, are water. The entire CDP is within the watershed of the Passaic River leading to Newark Bay.

== Demographics ==
Historical population
Census	Pop.	Note	%±
2020	2,956		—
U.S. Decennial Census

Gillette was first listed as a census designated place in the 2020 U.S. census.

=== 2020 census ===
As of the 2020 census, Gillette had a population of 2,956. The median age was 45.0 years. 20.9% of residents were under the age of 18 and 19.2% of residents were 65 years of age or older. For every 100 females there were 89.4 males, and for every 100 females age 18 and over there were 88.3 males age 18 and over.

96.5% of residents lived in urban areas, while 3.5% lived in rural areas.

There were 1,100 households in Gillette, of which 31.5% had children under the age of 18 living in them. Of all households, 65.4% were married-couple households, 10.5% were households with a male householder and no spouse or partner present, and 20.4% were households with a female householder and no spouse or partner present. About 19.7% of all households were made up of individuals and 10.7% had someone living alone who was 65 years of age or older.

There were 1,157 housing units, of which 4.9% were vacant. The homeowner vacancy rate was 2.5% and the rental vacancy rate was 2.4%.

Gillette, New Jersey – Racial and ethnic composition Note: the US Census treats Hispanic/Latino as an ethnic category. This table excludes Latinos from the racial categories and assigns them to a separate category. Hispanics/Latinos may be of any race.
Race / Ethnicity (NH = Non-Hispanic)	Pop 2020	2020 %
White alone (NH)	2,292	77.54%
Black or African American alone (NH)	16	0.54%
Native American or Alaska Native alone (NH)	2	0.07%
Asian alone (NH)	245	8.29%
Native Hawaiian or Pacific Islander alone (NH)	1	0.03%
Other race alone (NH)	11	0.37%
Mixed race or Multiracial (NH)	85	2.88%
Hispanic or Latino (any race)	304	10.28%
Total	2,956	100.00%

== Park ==
Gillette's Riverside Park was renamed Matthew G. Kantor Memorial Park in 2013, to honor a Navy SEAL killed in Afghanistan in 2012.

== Gallery ==
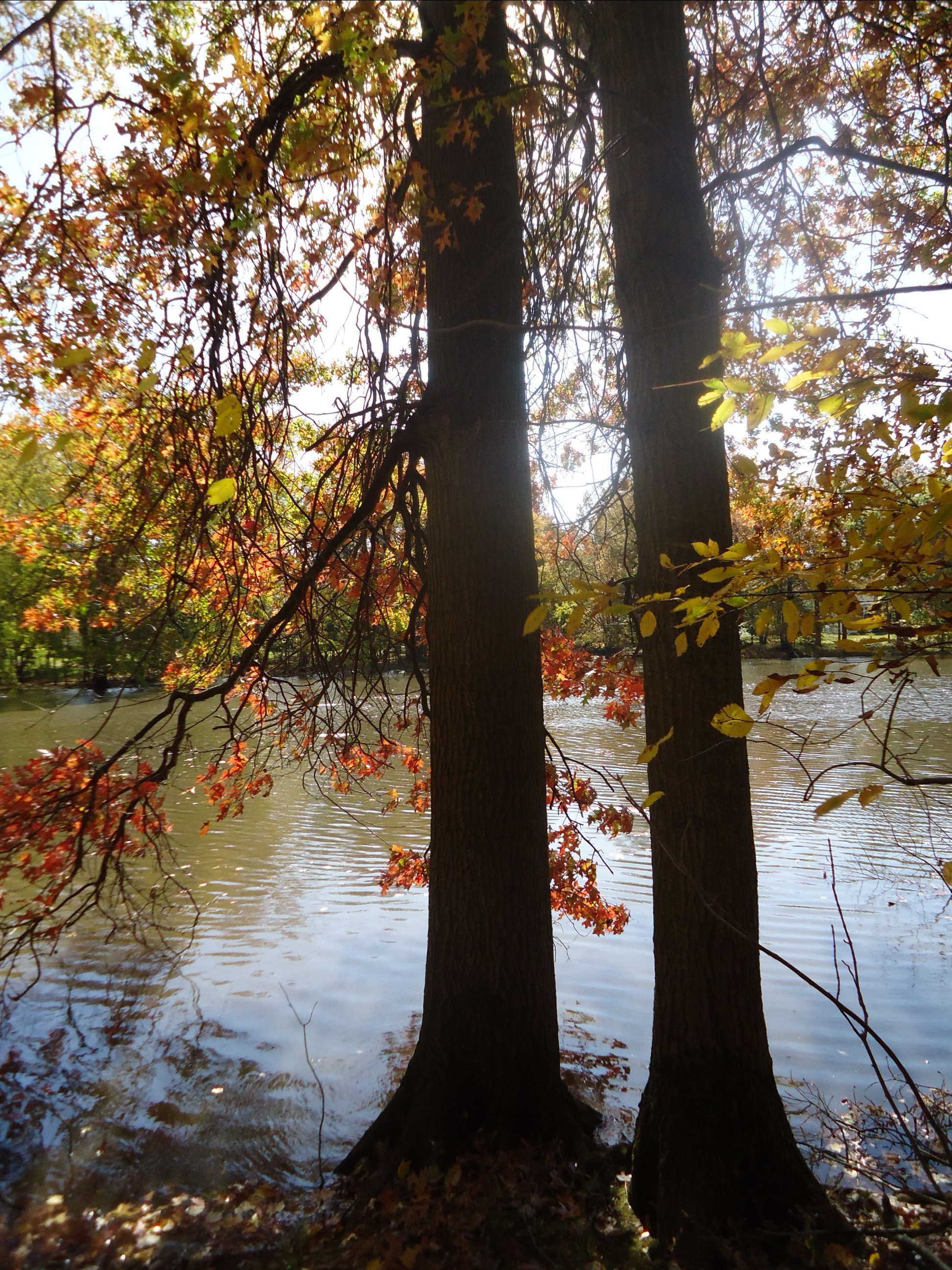
Passaic River

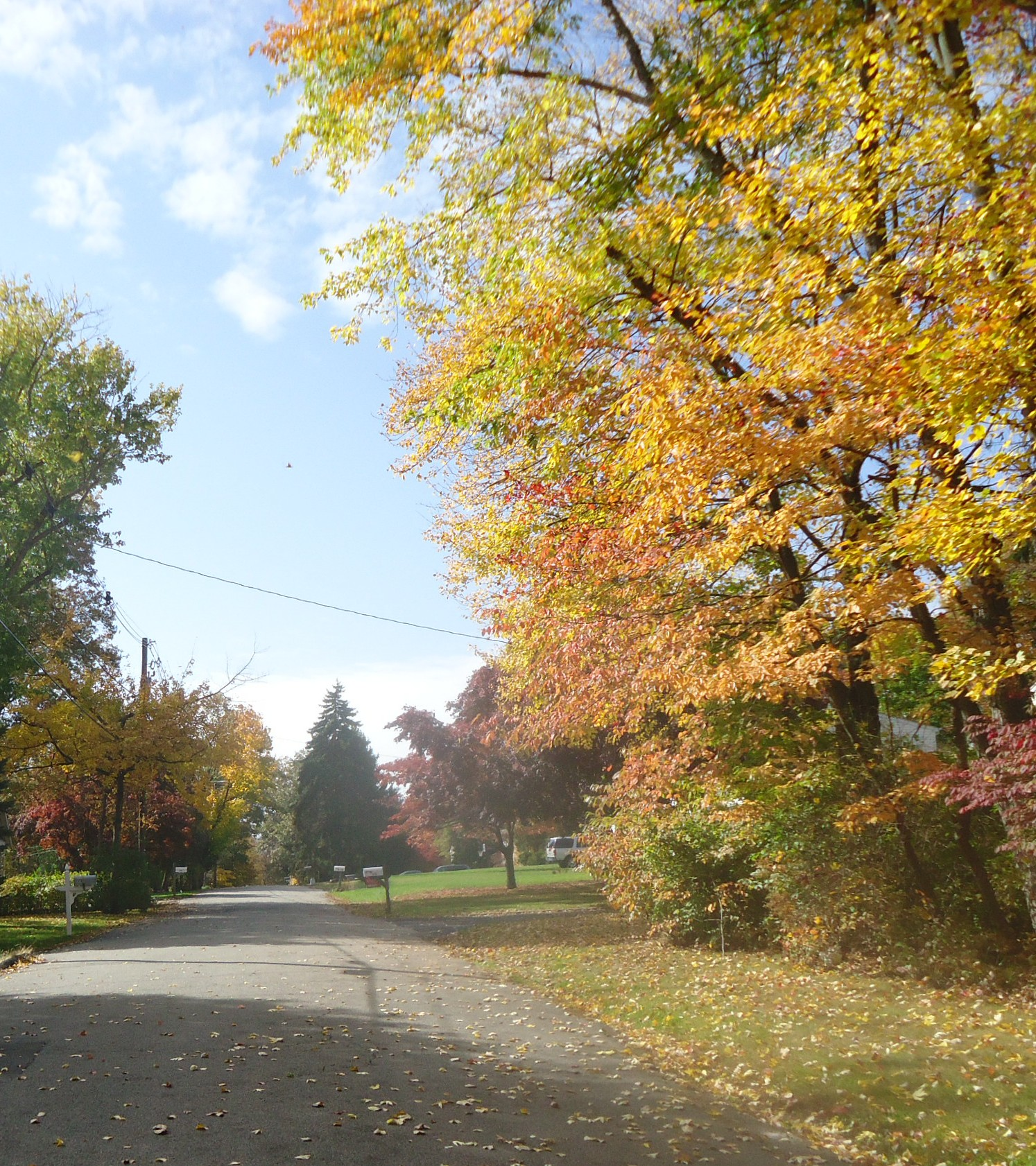
Residential street

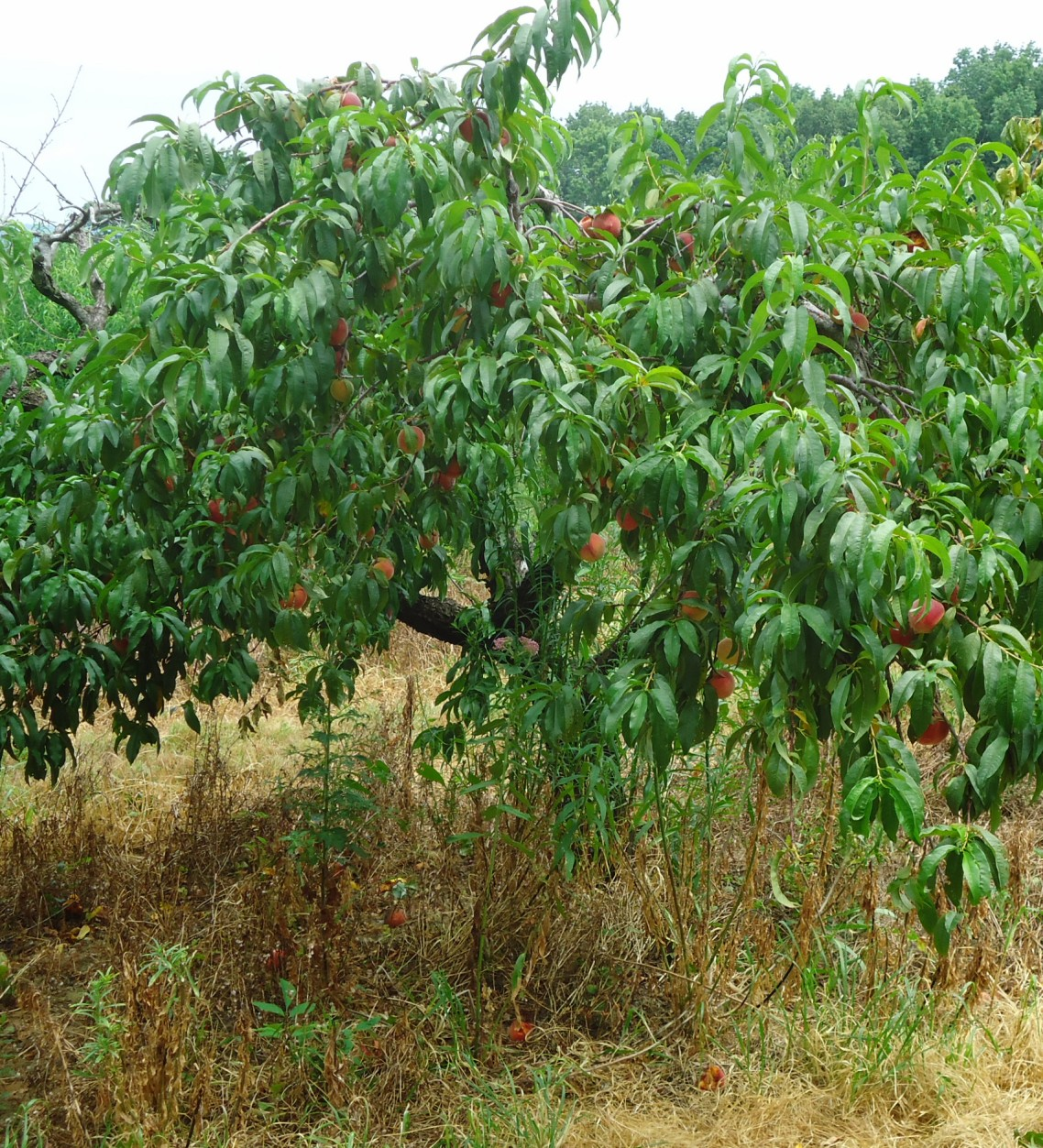
Peaches at Hillview Farms

== Notable people ==
People who were born in, residents of, or otherwise closely associated with Gillette include:

- Jessie Baylin (born 1984), singer-songwriter
- Lorinda Cherry (1944-2022), computer scientist and programmer

== See also ==
- Gillette station
