= List of county routes in Somerset County, New Jersey =

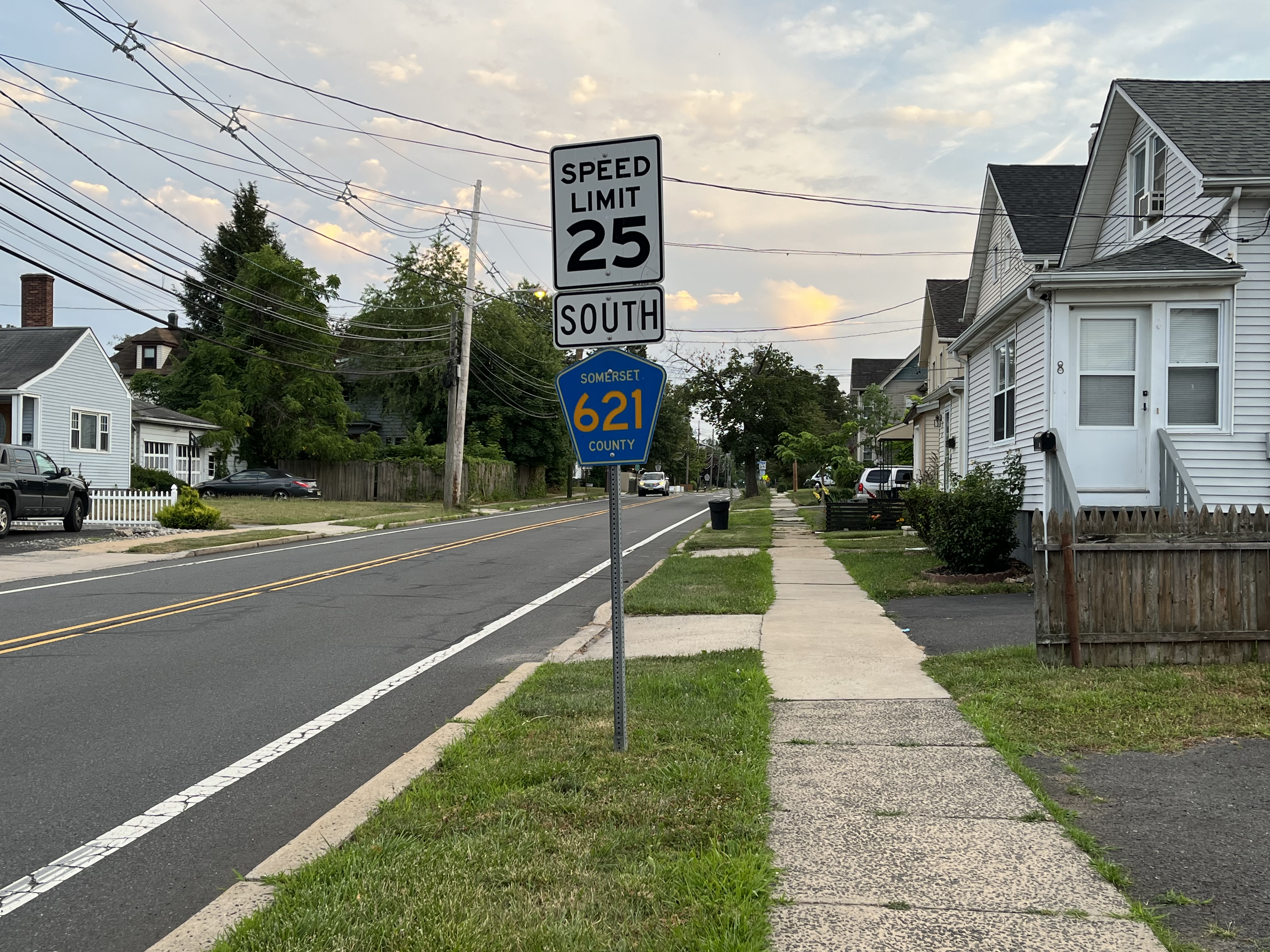
CR 621 (Elizabeth Street) southbound past CR 623 (Canal Road) in South Bound Brook

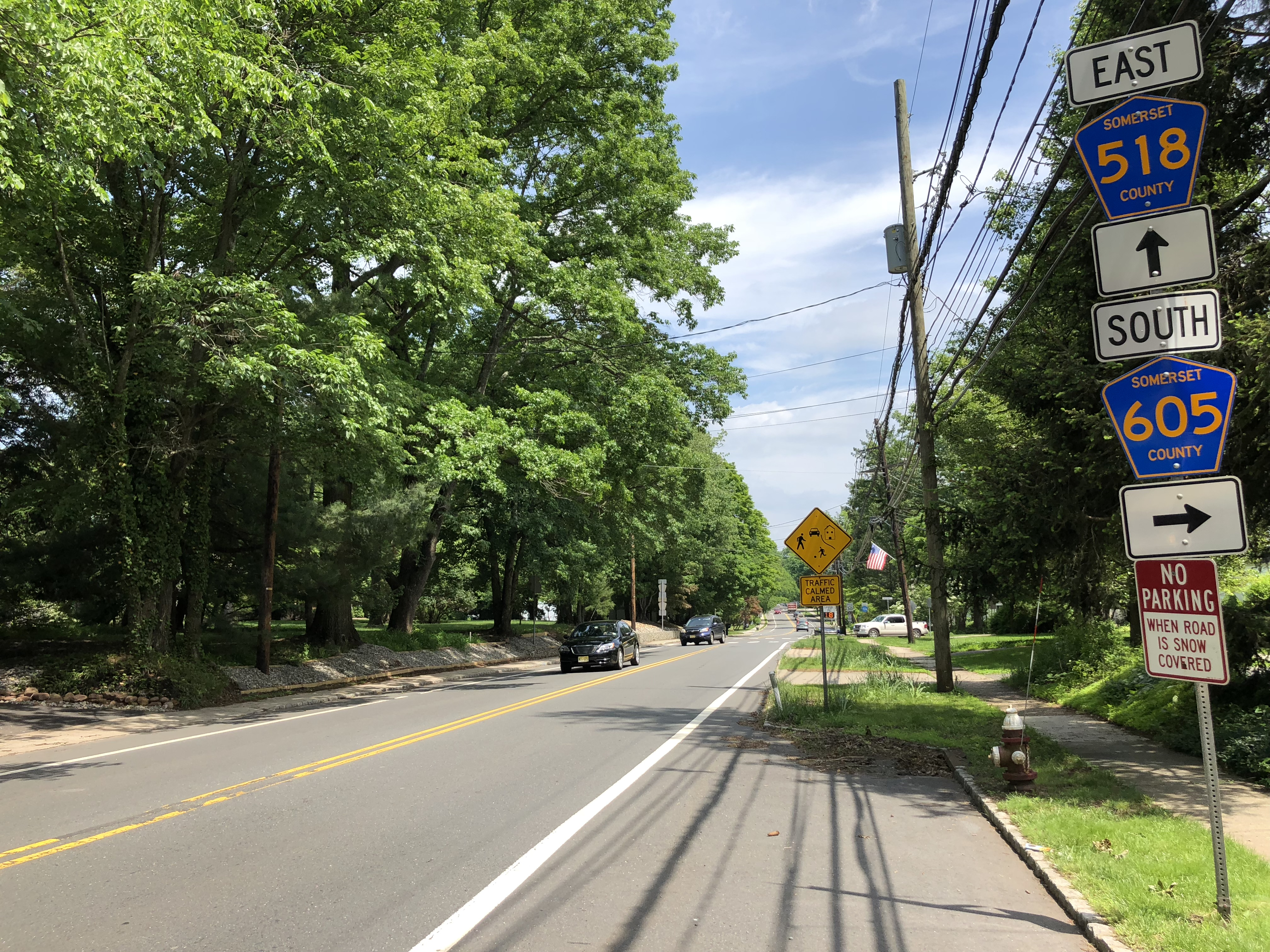
Example of signage along county routes in Somerset County, at the junction of CR 518 and CR 605 in Rocky Hill

The following is a list of county routes in Somerset County in the U.S. state of New Jersey. For more information on the county route system in New Jersey as a whole, including its history, see County routes in New Jersey.

== 500-series county routes ==
In addition to those listed below, the following 500-series county routes serve Somerset County:

- CR 512, CR 514, CR 518, CR 523, CR 525, CR 527, CR 529, CR 531, CR 533, CR 533 Spur, CR 567

== Other county routes ==
Route	Length (mi)	Length (km)	From	Via	To	Notes
CR 601	7.21	11.60	Great Road and Cherry Valley Road at the Mercer County line in Montgomery Township	Great Road, Belle Mead–Blawenburg Road, Trent Avenue	US 206 in Montgomery Township	
CR 602	0.52	0.84	Camp Meeting Avenue and CSX's Trenton Subdivision in Montgomery Township	Skillman Road	Belle Mead–Blawenburg Road (CR 601) and Skillman Road in Montgomery Township	
CR 603	1.85	2.98	Route 27 and Heathcote Road on the Franklin/South Brunswick township line	Laurel Avenue, Kingston–Rocky Hill Road	Georgetown–Franklin Turnpike (CR 518) and Canal Road in Franklin Township	
CR 604	1.50	2.41	Belle Meade–Blawenburg Road (CR 601) in Montgomery Township	Dutchtown–Harlingen Road	US 206 and Harlingen Road in Montgomery Township	
CR 605	1.57	2.53	River Road (CR 605) at the Mercer County line in Montgomery Township	River Road, Crescent Avenue	Washington Street (CR 518) in Rocky Hill	
CR 606	0.26	0.42	South Branch Road (CR 567) in Branchburg	Studdiford Drive	River Road (CR 625) in Hillsborough	
CR 607	1.14	1.83	Route 27 on the Franklin/South Brunswick township line	Old Road	Dead end on the Franklin/South Brunswick township line	Unsigned, follows the Franklin/South Brunswick township line; also known as Middlesex CR 618
CR 608	1.67	2.69	US 206 in Hillsborough	Dukes Parkway East	North Main Street (CR 533) in Manville	
CR 609	1.91	3.07	River Road (CR 533) in Montgomery Township	Bridgepoint Road	US 206 in Montgomery Township	Decommissioned in 2006, but still signed
CR 610	1.05	1.69	Canal Road (CR 623) in South Bound Brook	Edgewood Terrace	Main Street (CR 527) in South Bound Brook	
CR 612	1.34	2.16	Main Street (Route 28) and North Gaston Avenue (Route 28) in Somerville	East Main Street	East Main Street (CR 533) and Finderne Avenue (CR 533/CR 633) in Bridgewater	
CR 613	5.62	9.04	Valley Road (CR 512) in Bernards Township	Stonehouse Road, South Finley Avenue, North Finley Avenue, Childs Road	US 202 in Bernardsville	
CR 614	2.13	3.43	US 22 in Branchburg	Easton Turnpike	US 22 and Easton Turnpike (Route 28) in Bridgewater	
CR 615	5.23	8.42	Route 27 on the Franklin/South Brunswick township line	South Middlebush Road	Amwell Road (CR 514) in Franklin Township	
CR 616	2.79	4.49	Washington Valley Road (CR 525) and Chimney Rock Road (CR 525) in Bridgewater	Washington Valley Road	Washington Valley Road (CR 527) and Morning Glory Road (CR 527) in Warren Township	
CR 617	1.91	3.07	Route 27 on the Franklin Township/New Brunswick border	Franklin Boulevard	Landing Lane (CR 609) at the Middlesex County line in Franklin Township	
CR 618	3.58	5.76	Liberty Corner Road (CR 525) on the Bernards/Warren township line	Mount Horeb Road	Mount Bethel Road (CR 651) in Warren Township	Designated by the New Jersey Department of Transportation as CR 607
CR 619	3.05	4.91	Amwell Road (CR 514) in Franklin Township	Cedar Grove Lane	Easton Avenue (CR 527) in Franklin Township	
CR 620	9.24	14.87	Rattlesnake Bridge Road (CR 665) in Bedminster	Burnt Mills Road, Washington Valley Road	Mt Horeb Road (CR 525) and Washington Valley Road (CR 525) in Bridgewater	
CR 621	4.30	6.92	Amwell Road (CR 514) in Franklin Township	Elizabeth Avenue, Elizabeth Street	Canal Road (CR 623) in South Bound Brook	
CR 622	1.46	2.35	Stirling Road (CR 653) in Warren Township	Mountain Avenue	Mountain Avenue (CR 622) at the Union County line in Warren Township	
CR 623	4.15	6.68	South Main Street (CR 533) in Manville	Wilhousky Street, Manville Causeway, Weston Canal Road, Canal Road	Main Street (CR 527) in South Bound Brook	
CR 624	1.03	1.66	Mount Airy Road (CR 525) in Bernards Township	West Oak Street, East Oak Street	South Maple Avenue (CR 657) and North Maple Avenue (CR 657) in Bernards Township	
CR 625	8.27	13.31	Amwell Road (CR 514) in Hillsborough	Marshall Road, South Branch Road, River Road, Lyman Street	First Avenue (CR 567) and Somerset Street (CR 567/CR 626) in Raritan	
CR 626	1.04	1.67	First Avenue CR 567, Somerset Street (CR 567), and Lyman Street (CR 625) in Raritan	Somerset Street	West End Avenue (Route 28) in Somerville	
CR 627	3.34	5.38	South Branch Road (CR 625) in Hillsborough	New Centre Road	Roycefield Road and Dukes Parkway West in Hillsborough	
CR 628	0.09	0.14	Main Street (CR 671) and Old Chester Road (CR 671) in Peapack-Gladstone	Jackson Avenue	Mendham Road (CR 647) in Peapack-Gladstone	
CR 629	1.70	2.74	Pleasant Run Road (CR 567) and South Branch Road (CR 567) in Branchburg	Pleasant Run Road	Pleasant Run Road (CR 629) at the Hunterdon County line in Branchburg	
CR 630	2.71	4.36	US 206 in Montgomery Township	Belle Mead–Griggstown Road, Griggstown Road	River Road (CR 533) in Montgomery Township	
CR 631	0.34	0.55	US 22 in North Plainfield	Somerset Street, Johnston Drive	Watchung Avenue (CR 531) in Watchung	
CR 632	3.28	5.28	River Road (CR 533) in Montgomery Township	Griggstown Causeway, Canal Road, Bunkerhill Road	Route 27 on the Franklin/South Brunswick township line	
CR 633	0.93	1.50	Finderne Avenue (CR 533) and East Main Street (CR 533/CR 612) in Bridgewater	Finderne Avenue	US 22 in Bridgewater	
CR 634	3.24	5.21	Sebrings Mills Road in Green Brook	Greenbrook Road, Warrenville Road	Rock Avenue (CR 645) on the Green Brook/North Plainfield border	
CR 635	0.48	0.77	Talmage Avenue (CR 533) in Bound Brook	Vosseller Avenue	Union Avenue (Route 28) in Bound Brook	
CR 636	1.97	3.17	Rock Avenue (CR 645) on the Green Brook/North Plainfield border	Greenbrook Road	Mountain Avenue (CR 531) in North Plainfield	
CR 637	4.80	7.72	Old York Road (CR 567) and South Branch Road (CR 567) in Branchburg	Old York Road, Dreahook Road, Readington Road, Raritan Valley College Road	Easton Turnpike (CR 614) in Branchburg	
CR 638	0.36	0.58	Washington Valley Road (CR 527) and Mountain Boulevard (CR 527) in Warren Township	Washington Valley Road Extension	Warrenville Road (CR 651) in Warren Township	
CR 639	2.61	4.20	Pannone Drive and Grove Street in Bridgewater	North Bridge Street, Foothill Road	US 202/US 206 in Bridgewater	
CR 640	2.26	3.64	Church Street (CR 512) and Valley Road (CR 512) in Bernards Township	Lyons Road, South Finley Avenue	Stonehouse Road (CR 613) and South Finley Avenue (CR 613) in Bernards Township	
CR 641	2.39	3.85	Easton Turnpike (CR 614) in Branchburg	Burnt Mills Road, Cowperthwaite Road	Burnt Mills Road (CR 620) in Bedminster	
CR 642	1.51	2.43	Somerset Street (CR 531) in North Plainfield	Mountain Avenue	US 22 in North Plainfield	
CR 643	0.80	1.29	Somerset Street (CR 626) in Somerville	Mountain Avenue	US 22 on the Bridgewater/Somerville border	
CR 644	0.39	0.63	Dead end in Raritan	Frelinghuysen Avenue	West End Avenue (Route 28) on the Raritan/Bridgewater border	
CR 645	0.64	1.03	Rock Avenue at the Union County line on the Green Brook/North Plainfield border	Rock Avenue	US 22 on the Green Brook/North Plainfield border	
CR 646	0.56	0.90	US 202 in Branchburg	Chubb Way	South Branch Road (CR 567) in Branchburg	
CR 647	1.06	1.71	Main Street (CR 512) in Peapack-Gladstone	Mendham Road	Mendham Road at the Morris County line in Peapack-Gladstone	
CR 648	1.34	2.16	Route 27 on the Franklin/South Brunswick township line	Claremont Road	South Middlebush Road (CR 615) in Franklin Township	
CR 649	0.95	1.53	Grant Avenue at Union County line in North Plainfield	West End Avenue	US 22 in North Plainfield	
CR 650	0.82	1.32	Dead end in Hillsborough	Schilke Lane, Amwell Road	Millstone River Road (CR 533) in Millstone	
CR 651	6.13	9.87	Warrenville Road at the Middlesex County line in Green Brook	Warrenville Road, Mount Bethel Road, King George Road	Valley Road (CR 512) in Bernards Township	
CR 652	4.66	7.50	I-287 in Bedminster	Schley Mountain Road, Allen Road	Martinsville Road (CR 525) in Bernards Township	One sign at each east/west terminus as of 2025
CR 653	3.02	4.86	Mountain Boulevard (CR 527), Somerset Street (CR 531), Valley Road (CR 527), and Hillcrest Road (CR 531) at the Watchung Circle in Watchung	Stirling Road	Plainfield Road (CR 606) at the Morris County line in Warren Township	
CR 654	0.23	0.37	East Main Street (CR 533) in Bound Brook	East High Street, Veterans Memorial Drive	East Street (CR 689) in Bound Brook	
CR 655	0.82	1.32	Park Avenue (Union CR 655) and Bonnie Burn Road at the Union County line in Watchung	New Providence Road	Diamond Hill Road (Union CR 655) at the Union County line in Watchung	
CR 656	0.07	0.11	Route 27 in Franklin Township	Andover Drive	Old Road (CR 607) on the Franklin/South Brunswick township line	Unsigned
CR 657	2.07	3.33	Basking Ridge Road (Morris CR 657) at the Morris County line in Bernards Township	South Maple Avenue	East Oak Street (CR 624) in Bernards Township	
CR 658	0.26	0.42	Millstone River Road (CR 533) in Hillsborough	Blackwells Mills Road	Canal Road in Franklin Township	
CR 659	2.48	3.99	Claremont Road (CR 525) and Mendham Road (CR 525) in Bernardsville	Claremont Road, Turnbull Lane, Dryden Road	Bliss Road at the Morris County line in Bernardsville	
CR 660	0.07	0.11	Amwell Road (CR 514) in Hillsborough	Byara Court	Dead end in Hillsborough	Unsigned
CR 661	0.45	0.72	US 206 in Peapack-Gladstone	Holland Avenue	Main Street (CR 512) in Peapack-Gladstone	
CR 662	0.27	0.43	Dead end in Hillsborough	Brower Lane	Dead end in Hillsborough	Unsigned
CR 663	0.06	0.10	Ramp to US 22 at the Union County line in Watchung	Union Avenue	New Providence Road (CR 655) in Watchung	
CR 665	4.15	6.68	Easton Turnpike (CR 614) in Branchburg	Lamington Road, Rattlesnake Bridge Road	Lamington Road (CR 523) in Bedminster	Former CR 523 Spur
CR 667	0.99	1.59	River Road (CR 567) in Hillsborough	Elm Street, Maple Avenue, Pleasant Run Road	River Road (CR 567) and Pleasant Run Road (CR 567) in Branchburg	
CR 671	0.83	1.34	Main Street (CR 512) and Pottersville Road (CR 512) in Peapack-Gladstone	Main Street, Old Chester Road	Old Chester Road at the Morris County line in Peapack-Gladstone	
CR 673	0.95	1.53	North Bridge Street (CR 639) and Prince Rodgers Avenue in Bridgewater	Vogt Drive	North Gaston Avenue in Bridgewater	
CR 675	1.94	3.12	Dead end in Bridgewater	Polhemus Lane, Chimney Rock Road	Chimney Rock Road (CR 525) and Thompson Avenue (CR 525) in Bridgewater	
CR 677	0.70	1.13	Amwell Road (CR 514) in Hillsborough	East Mountain Road	South Branch Road (CR 625) in Hillsborough	
CR 679	1.56	2.51	Readington Road (CR 637) in Branchburg	Station Road	Easton Turnpike (CR 614) in Branchburg	
CR 681	0.10	0.16	Schilke Drive (CR 650) and Amwell Road (CR 650) in Hillsborough	Amsterdam Drive	Amwell Road (CR 514) in Hillsborough	
CR 683	0.52	0.84	East Main Street (CR 533) in Bridgewater	Foothill Road	Chimney Rock Road (CR 675) in Bridgewater	
CR 685	0.66	1.06	East Main Street (CR 533) in Bridgewater	Promenade Boulevard	Union Avenue (Route 28) in Bridgewater	
CR 687	0.53	0.85	Talmage Avenue (CR 533) in Bound Brook	Tea Street	East Main Street (Route 28) in Bound Brook	
CR 689	0.34	0.55	East Main Street (CR 527/CR 533) in Bound Brook	Bolmer Boulevard, East Street	Union Avenue (Route 28) in Bound Brook	
CR 691	0.08	0.13	South Middlebush Road (CR 615) in Franklin Township	South Middlebush Road Extension	Dead end in Franklin Township	Unsigned
CR 693	0.06	0.10	Amwell Road (CR 514) in Hillsborough	Service Road	Brower Lane (CR 662) in Hillsborough	Unsigned
CR 695	0.9	1.45	Bonnie Burn Road and US 22 at the Union County line in Watchung	Bonnie Burn Road	Valley Road (CR 527) and Plainfield Avenue (CR 641) in Watchung	Assigned in October 2023 to replace the former southern segment of CR 641
