= County Route 527 (New Jersey) =

County highway in New Jersey, U.S.

County Route 527
- CR 527 highlighted in red, CR 527A in blue

Route information
- Length: 84.86 mi (136.57 km)
- Existed: January 1, 1953–present

Major junctions
- South end: Route 166 / CR 549 in Toms River
- G.S. Parkway / US 9 in Toms River; I-195 in Jackson Township; Route 18 in Old Bridge Township; I-95 Toll / N.J. Turnpike in East Brunswick; I-287 in Franklin Township; US 22 in Bridgewater Township; I-78 in Summit; I-280 in Roseland
- North end: Route 23 / CR 604 in Cedar Grove

Location
- Country: United States
- State: New Jersey
- Counties: Ocean, Monmouth, Middlesex, Somerset, Union, Essex

Highway system
- County routes in New Jersey; 500-series routes
← CR 526	→ CR 528

County Route 527 (CR 527) is a county route in the U.S. state of New Jersey. The highway extends 84.86 miles (136.57 km) from Main Street (Route 166 and CR 549) in Toms River to Pompton Avenue (Route 23) in Cedar Grove. It passes through more counties (six) than any other county route in New Jersey. CR 527 is also the second longest 500-series county route in New Jersey after CR 519. The county route traverses through the northernmost stretches of the Pine Barrens in South Jersey, much of the Raritan Valley and Rahway Valley regions in Central Jersey (providing access to Monmouth Battlefield State Park, Rutgers-New Brunswick, Delaware and Raritan Canal State Park, Watchung Reservation, and South Mountain Reservation), and the First and Second Watchung Mountains in North Jersey. It passes through Ocean, Monmouth, Middlesex, Somerset, Union, and Essex counties on the eastern side of the state.

It runs concurrently for 2.4 miles (3.9 km) with Route 18 in Middlesex County in addition to other minor state highways and county roads. The route has interchanges with the Garden State Parkway. Interstate 195 (I-195), I-95 (New Jersey Turnpike), I-287, I-78 and I-280. It was first given the number 527 in 1954.

== Route description ==
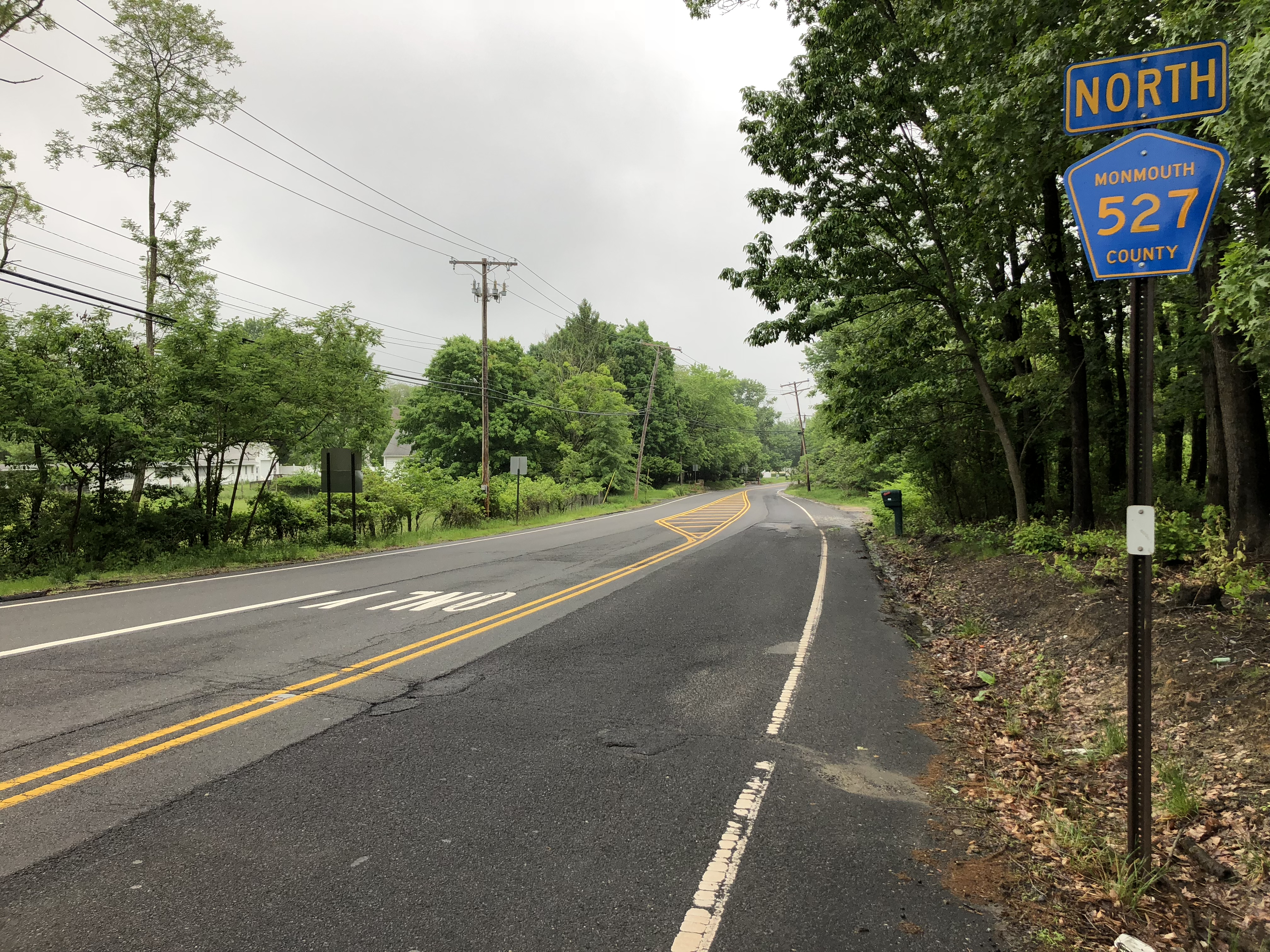
CR 527 northbound past CR 1 and CR 527A in Manalapan Township

CR 527 begins at a traffic light with Route 166 in Toms River. Passing some local roads at the beginning, CR 527 crosses an interchange with the Garden State Parkway at 0.53 of a mile (0.85 km). More than a mile later, Route 37 crosses CR 527 at a traffic light. Continuing through Toms River, CR 571 merges into CR 527 for about 3/4 mile (1.2 km). At 7.57 miles (12.18 km), Route 70 crosses CR 527. Just past 10 miles (16 km), CR 547 crosses into Jackson Township. Further in Jackson Township, CR 527 joins CR 528 for a 3.7-mile-long (6.0 km) concurrency. At the end of the concurrency, CR 527 continues straight while CR 528 leaves to the left and Bennetts Mills Road (CR 636) leaves to the right.

At 18.0 miles (29.0 km), West Commodore Boulevard/East Commodore Boulevard (CR 526) and CR 527 intersect. Less than a mile later, I-195 intersects CR 527. Past this interchange, the route passes east of the Jackson Park & Ride, a park and ride facility serving Academy Bus Lines. At 19.6 miles (31.5 km), CR 527 leaves Ocean County and enters Monmouth County. In Smithburg (the Freehold Township–Millstone–Manalapan township border), crossing the intersection of Monmouth Road (CR 524/CR 537). Past 24 miles (39 km) at Carrs Corner, CR 527 turns to the right heading northeast while an alternate route to CR 527, CR 527A begins straight ahead. At 26.6 miles (42.8 km), Route 33 crosses at a traffic light in Manalapan Township. CR 527 heads north enters Englishtown. In Englishtown, CR 527 reaches the northern terminus of CR 527A at South Main Street and becomes Main Street before it intersects with Tennent Avenue (CR 522. CR 527 forms a 0.07-mile-long (110 m) concurrency with CR 522 and splits from CR 527 by turning west on Water Street. At 30.5 miles (49.1 km), CR 527 re-enters Manalapan for a short distance. At 31.5 miles (50.7 km), CR 527 enters Monroe Township which is in Middlesex County. CR 527 spends a short time in Monroe Township as it soon enters Old Bridge Township. At 34.2 miles (55.0 km), Texas Road (CR 520) crosses at a traffic light. After passing local roads in Old Bridge, CR 527 forms a brief concurrency with CR 516 as they cross over Route 18. CR 527 leaves to the left at Old Matawan Road, crosses the South River, and enters East Brunswick. After the intersection of Main Street (CR 615), it continues on Old Bridge Turnpike bordering East Brunswick to the southwest and South River to the northeast. Just before 41 miles (66 km), Cranbury Road/Main Street (CR 535) crosses the intersection of CR 527 at a traffic light. Fully entering East Brunswick again, Route 18 and CR 527 merge for 2.4 miles (3.9 km). In this section, there are exits for the New Jersey Turnpike (I-95) and U.S. Route 1 (US 1). CR 527 follows Route 18 into New Brunswick and exits the concurrency with Route 18 and forms one for the entire length of Route 172 through Rutgers University's Douglass Campus. Heading northwest along New Brunswick's George Street, CR 527 then merges into a concurrency with Route 27 on Albany Street. CR 527 turns off Route 27 at Easton Avenue. At Hamilton Street (unsigned CR 514), CR 527 continues past numerous businesses towards the outskirts of New Brunswick.

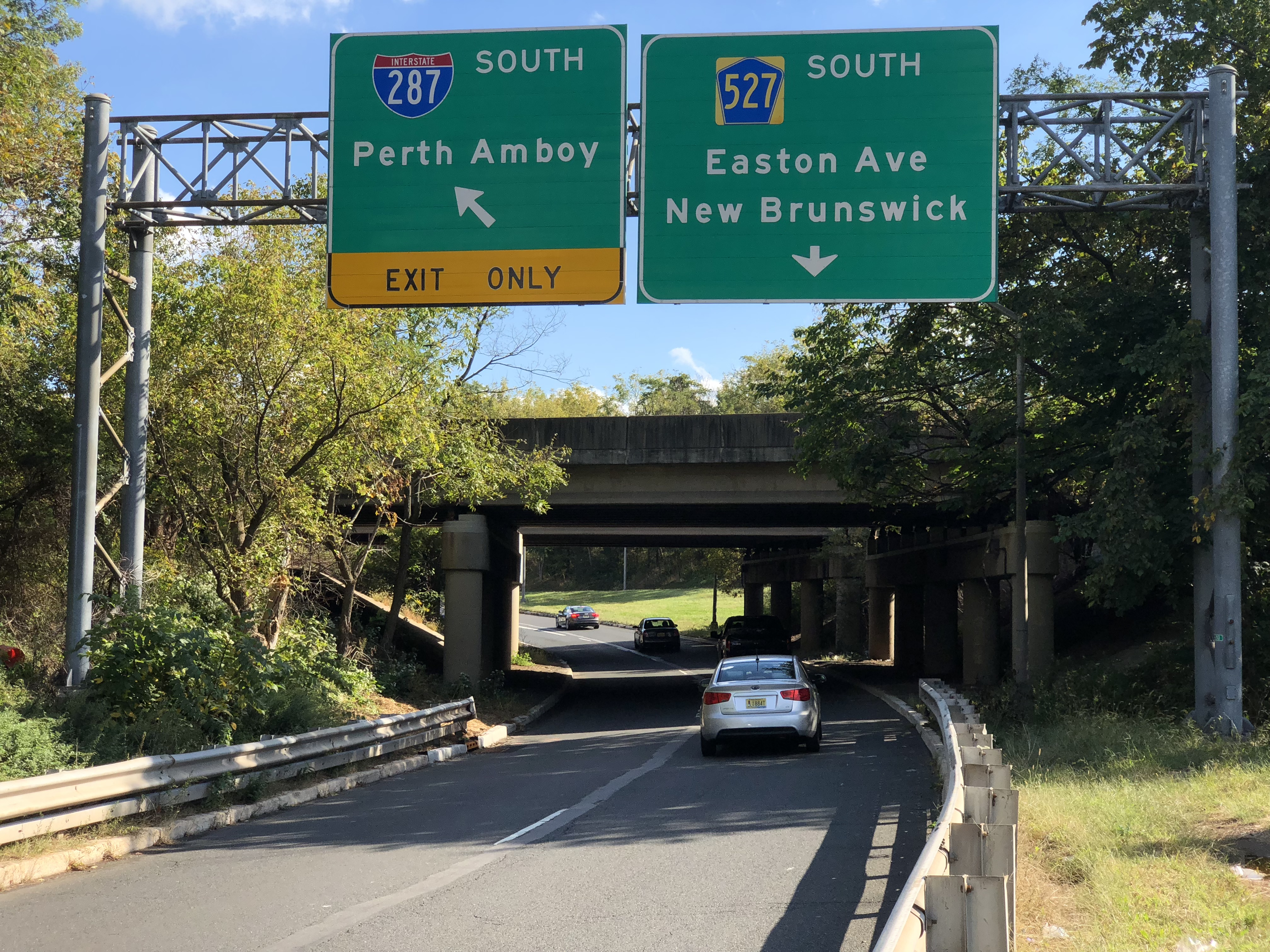
CR 527 southbound at I-287 in Franklin Township, Somerset County

At 48 miles (77 km), CR 527 enters Franklin Township, Somerset County, and approximately a half-mile later, CR 527 splits into a four-lane highway, known locally as Easton Avenue. The stretch does not last long as it ends at about 50.5 miles (81.3 km). At 51.2 miles (82.4 km), the roads split again and soon reach I-287. At 52.1 miles (83.8 km), CR 527 crosses the town border and enters South Bound Brook. Soon entering regular Bound Brook, the road divides again into a divided highway at 53.3 miles (85.8 km). The divided highway merges again at about 53.8 miles (86.6 km). At 54.3 miles (87.4 km), Route 28 crosses. After the intersection with Route 28, CR 527 enters Bridgewater Township and crosses with US 22. In Watchung, CR 529 leaves to the right. Just past the 61-mile (98 km) mark, the road divides again for a short time. In between this divided stage, CR 531 merges in. CR 531 leaves as the highways merge again. Now in Union County, CR 527 has two partial interchanges with I-78 as it skirts the Watchung Reservation. In the city of Summit, CR 527 and the easternmost section of CR 512 split into one-way pairs through an interchange with Route 24 and a concurrency with Route 124. CR 527 enters Essex County after the concurrency ends. CR 527 enters Millburn and splits into one-way pairs again, concurrent with CR 577 as it enters downtown. At 71.5 miles (115.1 km), CR 577 leaves to the right. Just before 74 miles (119 km), CR 510 crosses. The road passes by Cooperman Barnabas Medical Center. At 75 miles (121 km), CR 508 crosses at a traffic light as the route enters Livingston. Route 10 crosses at 77.2 miles (124.2 km) and then I-280 crosses at 78 miles (126 km). In Caldwell, CR 527 merges with CR 506 for about 0.62 miles (1.00 km). CR 527 ends at an intersection with Route 23 in Cedar Grove.

== History ==
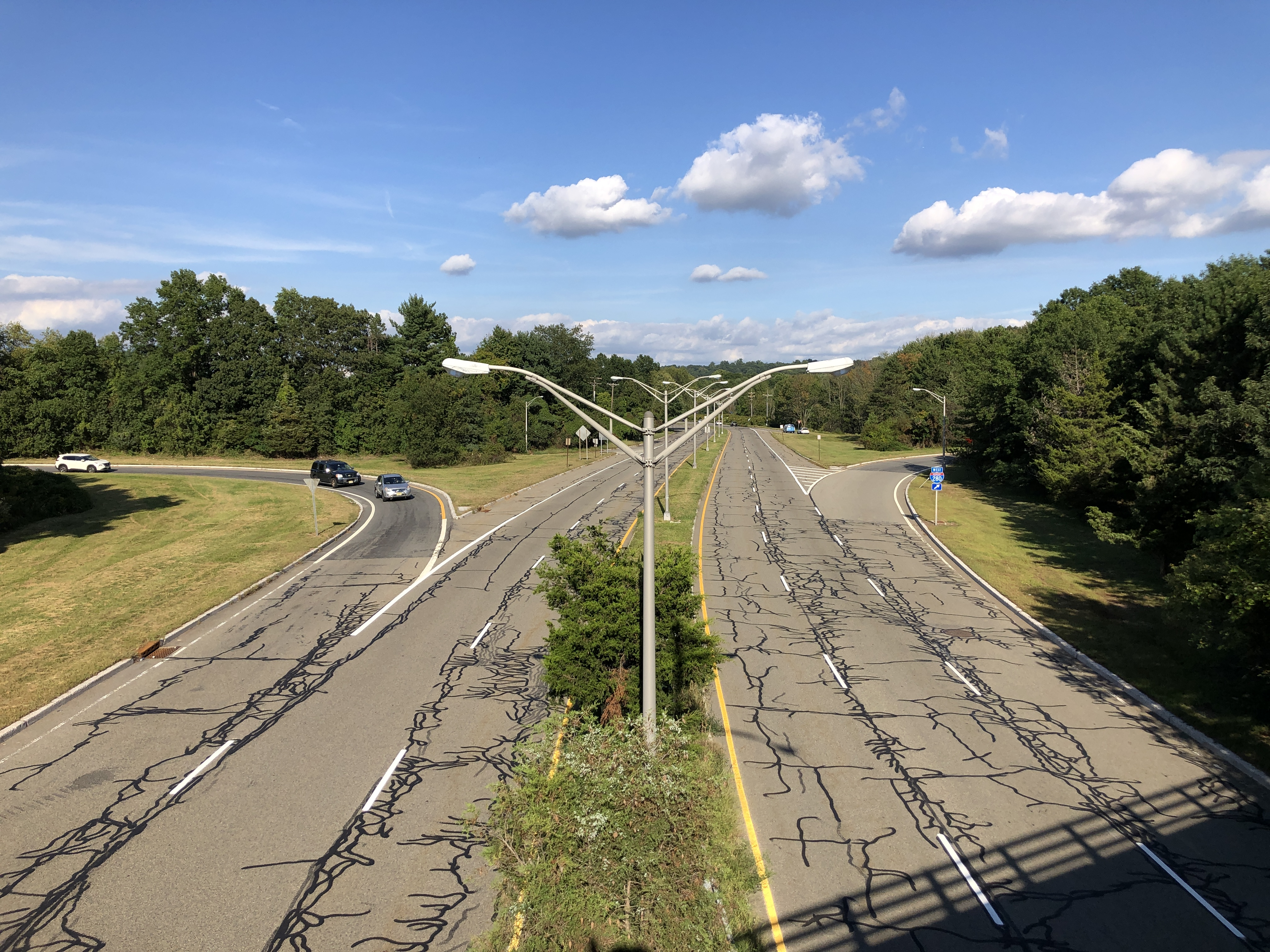
View northbound along CR 527 from I-280 in Roseland

From the New-East Brunswick Line to Old Bridge, the road was once maintained by the East Brunswick and New Brunswick Turnpike Company, chartered in 1865. It was once part of State Route S-24, now Route 18, though this was bypassed.

The New Brunswick section of CR 527 was known as County Route 3R11 back in 1947. The parts south of that in Middlesex County was known as County Route 3R10. By 1954, the road was known as CR 527, part of the 500-series county roads adopted by the state of New Jersey.

Two former spur routes of CR 527 existed. The first CR 527 Spur in Somerset County ran along what is now CR 651, CR 512, and CR 613. The second CR 527 Spur ran along what is now CR 608 and CR 649.

== Major intersections ==
County	Location	mi	km	Destinations	Notes
Ocean	Toms River	0.00	0.00	Route 166 (Main Street) / CR 549 north (Water Street)	Southern terminus; southern terminus of CR 549
Ocean	Toms River	0.53	0.85	G.S. Parkway / US 9 – New York, Beachwood, Atlantic City	Exit 81 on G.S. Parkway
Ocean	Toms River	1.97	3.17	Route 37	
Ocean	Toms River	4.10	6.60	CR 571 east (Indian Head Road)	Southern end of CR 571 concurrency
Ocean	Toms River	4.85	7.81	CR 571 west (Ridgeway Road)	Northern end of CR 571 concurrency
Ocean	Toms River	7.57	12.18	Route 70 – Lakehurst, Brielle	
Ocean	Jackson Township	10.30	16.58	CR 547 (South Hope Chapel Road)	
Ocean	Jackson Township	11.71	18.85	CR 528 east (East Veterans Highway) – Lakewood Township	Southern end of CR 528 concurrency
Ocean	Jackson Township	15.49	24.93	CR 528 west (West Veterans Highway) / CR 636 east (Bennetts Mills Road) – Plumsted Township, Freehold Township	Northern end of CR 528 concurrency; western terminus of CR 636
Ocean	Jackson Township	18.05	29.05	CR 526 (Commodore Boulevard)	
Ocean	Jackson Township	18.47	29.72	I-195 to I-95 Toll / N.J. Turnpike – Trenton, Belmar	Exit 21 on I-195
Monmouth	Freehold–Millstone– Manalapan township tripoint	22.44	36.11	CR 524 / CR 537 (Monmouth Road)	Forms the municipal tripoint Smithburg
Monmouth	Millstone–Manalapan township line	24.38	39.24	CR 1 west (Sweetmans Lane) / CR 527A north (Smithburg Road) to Route 33 – Perrineville	Eastern terminus of CR 1; southern terminus of CR 527A
Monmouth	Manalapan Township	26.61	42.82	Route 33 – Hightstown, Freehold Township	
Monmouth	Englishtown	29.84	48.02	CR 527A south (South Main Street)	Northern terminus of CR 527A
Monmouth	Englishtown	29.97	48.23	CR 522 east (Tennent Avenue)	Southern end of CR 522 concurrency
Monmouth	Englishtown	30.08	48.41	CR 522 west (Water Street)	Northern end of CR 522 concurrency
Middlesex	Old Bridge Township	34.29	55.18	CR 520 east (Texas Road) to I-95 Toll / N.J. Turnpike	Western terminus of CR 520
Middlesex	Old Bridge Township	37.86	60.93	Route 18 north CR 516 begins	Interchange; western terminus of CR 516
Middlesex	Old Bridge Township	38.0	61.2	CR 516 east (Old Bridge Matawan Road)	Northern end of CR 516 concurrency
Middlesex	East Brunswick	38.68– 38.82	62.25– 62.47	Route 18 north / CR 615 (Main Street) to I-95 Toll / N.J. Turnpike – New Brunswick	Interchange
Middlesex	East Brunswick	40.92	65.85	CR 535 (Cranbury Road / Main Street)	
Middlesex	East Brunswick	42.92	69.07	Route 18 south	Southern end of Route 18 concurrency
Middlesex	East Brunswick	43.97	70.76	Southern end of limited-access section	
Middlesex	East Brunswick	43.97	70.76	I-95 Toll / N.J. Turnpike	Exit 9 on I-95 / Turnpike
Middlesex	New Brunswick	44.64	71.84	US 1 – Newark, Trenton	Partial cloverleaf interchange
Middlesex	New Brunswick	45.28	72.87	Route 18 north / Route 172 west – Piscataway	Northern end of Route 18 concurrency; eastern terminus of Route 172; no northbound entrance
Middlesex	New Brunswick	45.28	72.87	Northern end of limited-access section	
Middlesex	New Brunswick	46.04	74.09	Route 172 ends	
Middlesex	New Brunswick	46.74	75.22	Route 27 north (Albany Street) / CR 672 (George Street)	Southern end of Route 27 concurrency
Middlesex	New Brunswick	46.84	75.38	Route 27 south (French Street)	Northern end of Route 27 concurrency
Middlesex	New Brunswick	46.95	75.56	CR 514 (Hamilton Street)	
Somerset	Franklin Township	51.58	83.01	I-287 – Perth Amboy, Morristown, Mahwah	Exit 10 on I-287
Somerset	Bound Brook	53.36	85.87	CR 533 north (East Main Street) / CR 689 north (East Street)	Southern end of CR 533 concurrency; southern terminus of CR 689; roundabout
Somerset	Bound Brook	53.60	86.26	CR 533 south (East Main Street)	Northern end of CR 533 concurrency
Somerset	Bound Brook	53.94	86.81	Route 28 (East Union Avenue) – Somerville, Plainfield	
Somerset	Bridgewater Township	54.85	88.27	US 22 – Somerville, Newark	Interchange
Somerset	Watchung	59.47	95.71	CR 529 south (Washington Rock Road)	Northern terminus of CR 529
Somerset	Watchung	60.95– 61.05	98.09– 98.25	CR 531 (Somerset Street / Hillcrest Road) to I-78 – North Plainfield	Roundabout
Union	Berkeley Heights	65.40	105.25	I-78 east – Newark	Exit 44 on I-78
Union	Summit	67.35	108.39	I-78 west – Easton	Southbound exit only
Union	Summit	69.69	112.16	CR 512 west	Eastern terminus of CR 512
Union	Springfield Township	69.80	112.33	Route 24 east to I-78	Exit 9A on Route 24
Union	Springfield Township	70.08	112.78	Route 124 west to Route 24 – Summit, Chatham, Morristown	Southern end of Route 124 concurrency
Essex	Millburn	70.10	112.82	Route 124 east – Elizabeth, Newark	Northern end of Route 124 concurrency
Essex	Millburn	71.19	114.57	CR 577 (Main Street / Millburn Avenue)	
Essex	Millburn	73.57	118.40	CR 510 (South Orange Avenue)	
Essex	Livingston	74.80	120.38	CR 508 (Northfield Avenue)	
Essex	Livingston	76.90	123.76	Route 10 (Mt. Pleasant Avenue) – Whippany, Newark	
Essex	Roseland	78.16	125.79	I-280 – Parsippany, Newark	Exits 5A-B on I-280
Essex	Caldwell	80.79	130.02	CR 506 west (Bloomfield Avenue)	Southern end of CR 506 concurrency
Essex	Caldwell	81.41	131.02	CR 506 east (Bloomfield Avenue)	Northern end of CR 506 concurrency
Essex	Cedar Grove	84.86	136.57	Route 23 (Pompton Avenue) / CR 604 (Lindsley Road)	Northern terminus
1.000 mi = 1.609 km; 1.000 km = 0.621 mi: Concurrency terminus; Incomplete access; Tolled

== CR 527A ==
County Route 527A
- Location: Millstone Township–Englishtown
- Length: 5.92 mi (9.53 km)

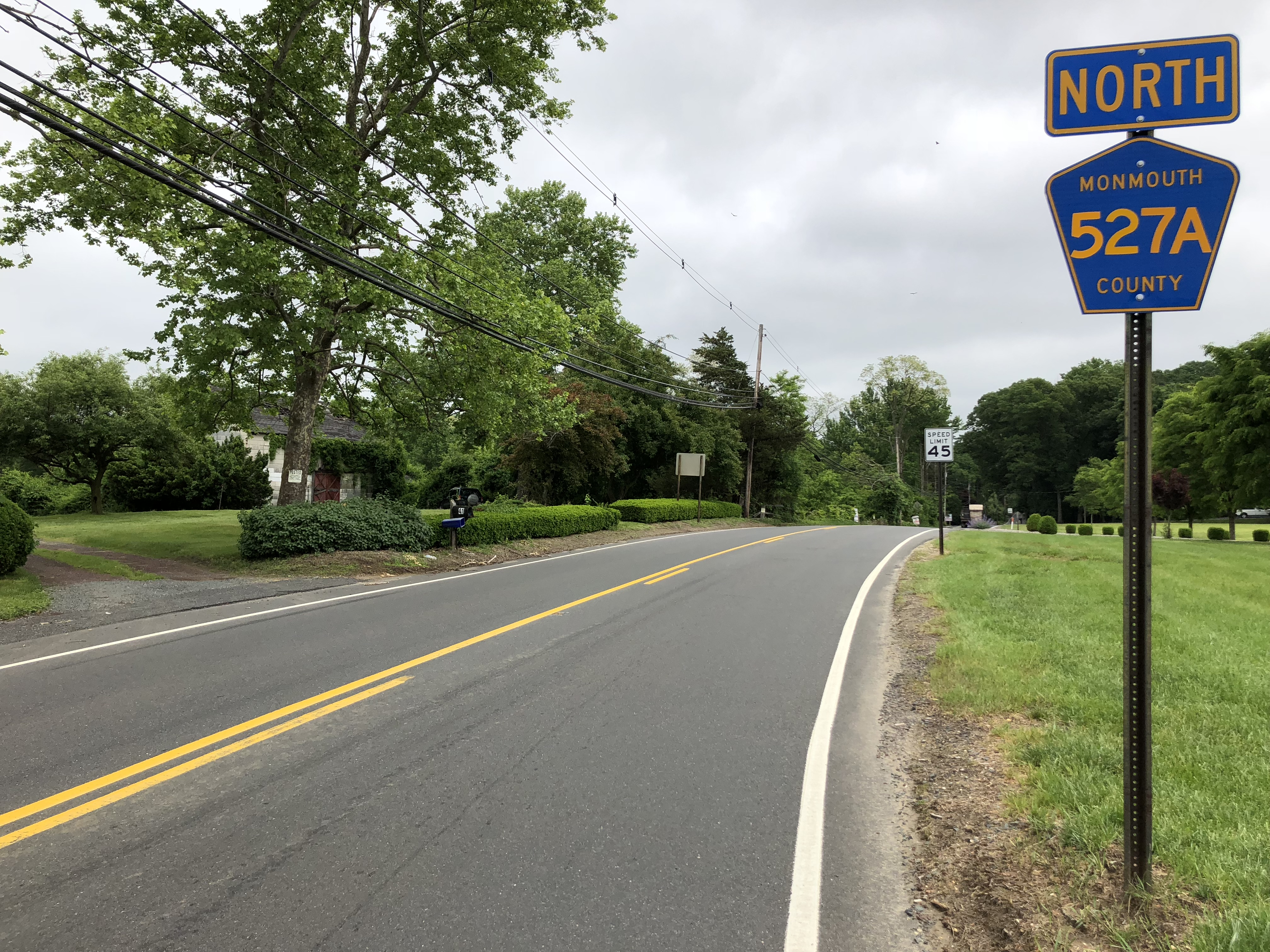
View north along CR 527A (Iron Ore Road) at Indian Path and Dugans Grove Road in Manalapan

County Route 527A (also known as County Route 527 Alternate or CR 527A) is a county highway in Monmouth County, New Jersey. The highway extends about six miles (9.7 km) from Sweetmans Lane (CR 527 and CR 1) in Carrs Corner, on the border of Millstone Township and Manalapan Township, following Woodville Road, Iron Ore Road, High Bridge Road, and South Main Street to Park Avenue/South Main Street in Englishtown. It crosses the intersection of Route 33 about halfway between its two termini.

The section of the highway named Iron Ore Road was once part of the Manalapanville and Englishtown Turnpike, chartered in 1863 to run from Englishtown to Manalapanville, on the border of Millstone Township, including High Bridge Road and Main Street into Englishtown and Dugan's Grove Road.

Near its northern terminus, CR 527A formerly followed Iron Ore Road to its end at Millhurst Road (CR 527) in Manalapan Township, but in late 2015, a jurisdiction swap between Monmouth County and Manalapan and Englishtown routed the county road on a straighter course into the borough.

Major intersections
The entire route is in Monmouth County.

Location	mi	km	Destinations	Notes
Millstone–Manalapan township line	0.00	0.00	CR 1 west (Sweetmans Lane) / CR 527 (Smithburg Road) – Perrineville, Millhurst	Southern terminus; eastern terminus of CR 1
Millstone–Manalapan township line	2.25	3.62	Route 33 – Hightstown, Freehold Township	
Englishtown	5.92	9.53	CR 527 (Park Avenue / South Main Street)	Northern terminus
1.000 mi = 1.609 km; 1.000 km = 0.621 mi

== In popular culture ==
The northernmost section of County Route 527 (Mountain Avenue) in North Caldwell is showcased towards the end of the opening credits of the HBO television show The Sopranos, as the main character Tony Soprano drives up on the road. This shot of the road is around the corner from the real-life house that was used to portray the home of Tony Soprano and his family, located on 14 Aspen Drive.
