= County Route 514 (New Jersey) =

County highway in New Jersey, U.S.

County Route 514
- CR 514 highlighted in red

Route information
- Length: 43.4 mi (69.8 km)
- Existed: January 1, 1953–present
- Tourist routes: Millstone Valley Scenic Byway

Major junctions
- West end: US 202 / Route 31 / Route 179 in East Amwell Township
- US 206 in Hillsborough Township; Route 18 in New Brunswick; US 1 in Edison; I-95 Toll / N.J. Turnpike / I-287 / Route 440 in Edison; US 9 in Woodbridge Township; Route 35 in Woodbridge Township; US 1-9 in Rahway; Route 439 in Elizabeth
- East end: Edgar Road / Washington Avenue in Elizabeth

Location
- Country: United States
- State: New Jersey
- Counties: Hunterdon, Somerset, Middlesex, Union

Highway system
- County routes in New Jersey; 500-series routes
← CR 513	→ CR 515

County Route 514 (CR 514) is a county highway in the U.S. state of New Jersey. The highway extends 42.86 miles (68.98 km) from its western terminus US 202 and Route 31 in East Amwell Township to its eastern terminus Edgar Road in Elizabeth. West of its western terminus, CR 514 continues as Route 179.

== Route description ==
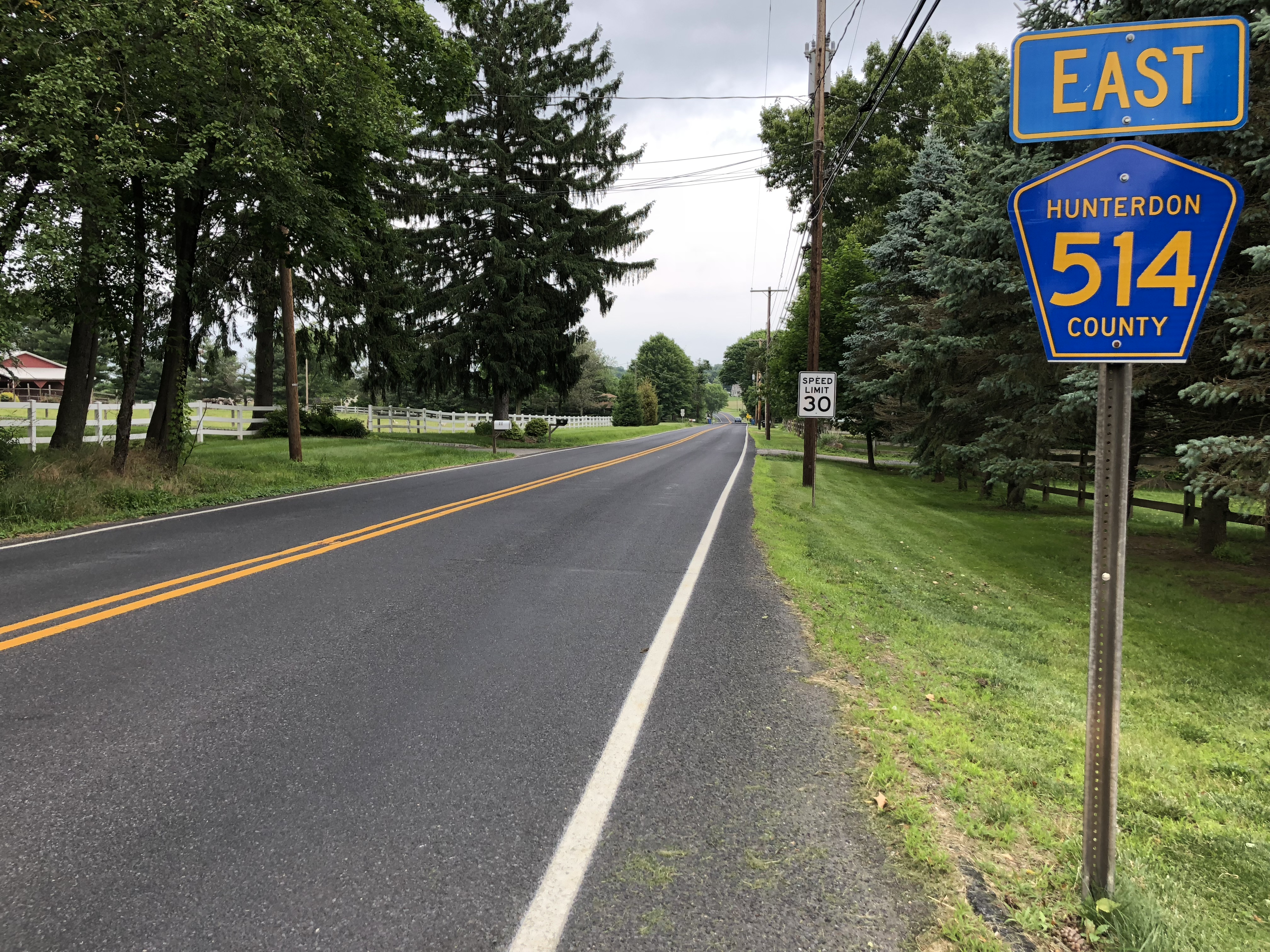
CR 514 eastbound past CR 609 on the border of Raritan Township and East Amwell Township

CR 514 begins at an intersection with U.S. Route 202/Route 31 in East Amwell Township, Hunterdon County, heading northeast on two-lane undivided Old York Road. West of US 202/Route 31, Old York Road becomes Route 179. A short distance after beginning, the road becomes the border between Raritan Township to the northwest and East Anwell to the southeast, passing through a mix of farmland and homes. The route reaches the residential community of Reaville, where CR 514 splits from Old York Road and heads northeast onto Amwell Road, with CR 613 continuing along Old York Road. The road comes to the intersection of Manners Road (CR 609) before running east through more areas of agriculture and housing developments.

CR 514 continues east into Hillsborough Township in Somerset County, passing farms before continuing into more wooded areas with some agriculture and residences. The road enters woodland as it reaches an intersection of River Road (CR 567) at Neshanic. The route passes through more areas of farms and woods before heading into wooded areas of residential development and coming to the intersection of East Mountain Road (CR 677). At this point, CR 514 runs through woodland before passing more residential subdivisions and widening to four lanes as it comes to the intersection of Marshall Road (CR 625). The route passes north of Hillsborough High School and curves to the northeast, passing to the northwest of a park and ride lot before coming to the intersection of U.S. Route 206. At this point, the roadway turns east again and narrows back to two lanes. The road passes housing developments to the north and fields to the south, coming to an interchange with U.S. Route 206 Bypass prior to passing over CSX's Trenton Subdivision. The route continues through farms, woods, and homes before reaching the intersection of Schilke Lane (CR 650), at which point CR 514 turns northeast and enters Millstone. The road bypasses the residential neighborhoods of the borough to the north by passing through woodland and fields, turning east and intersects with Somerset Courthouse Road (CR 533 Spur) and Main Street (CR 533).

The route crosses the Millstone River into Franklin Township and passes over the Delaware & Raritan Canal in developed area known as East Millstone. From this point, CR 514 continues through more farmland and woodland, intersecting with Elizabeth Avenue (CR 621) before turning north and coming to the intersection of Cedar Grove Lane (CR 619). At this point, the route turns east again and enters residential surroundings, intersecting with South Middlebush Road (CR 615), where it turns east-southeast and widens to four lanes. The road becomes Hamilton Street at the intersection of JFK Boulevard and heads into the community of Somerset. Here, the route begins to curve to the east-northeast as it comes to the intersection of Franklin Boulevard (CR 617), narrowing back to two lanes. Following this intersection, the road passes through a mix of homes and businesses.

Upon crossing Mile Run Stream, CR 514 enters New Brunswick in Middlesex County and becomes unsigned and city maintained. CR 514 passes through more residential and commercial development as it comes to an intersection with Easton Avenue (CR 527). CR 514 and Hamilton Street continue past off-campus residences of Rutgers University and later pass through the College Avenue Campus of the university. After passing the intersection of George Street (CR 672), the road becomes Johnson Drive and passes through the office complex of the Johnson & Johnson headquarters. The road curves to the south, passing under Amtrak's Northeast Corridor near the New Brunswick station, and a ramp to Route 18 south. At the intersection of (Route 27), CR 514 joins Albany Street and forms a concurrency with Route 27. After an interchange with Route 18, the road crosses the Raritan River on the Albany Street Bridge into Highland Park. Upon entering Highland Park, Route 27/CR 514 becomes two-lane Raritan Avenue, intersecting with River Road CR 622 and continuing through the downtown area of Highland Park. CR 514 splits from Route 27 by heading east on Woodbridge Avenue while Route 27 continues east-northeast on Raritan Avenue, where Middlesex County maintenance begins and signage resumes. Upon entering Edison, Duclos Lane (CR 676) intersects the route before it widens into a four-lane divided highway and interchanges with U.S. Route 1. Following this, the road becomes two lanes and undivided again as it comes to the intersection of Plainfield Avenue (CR 529) and passes through residential areas.

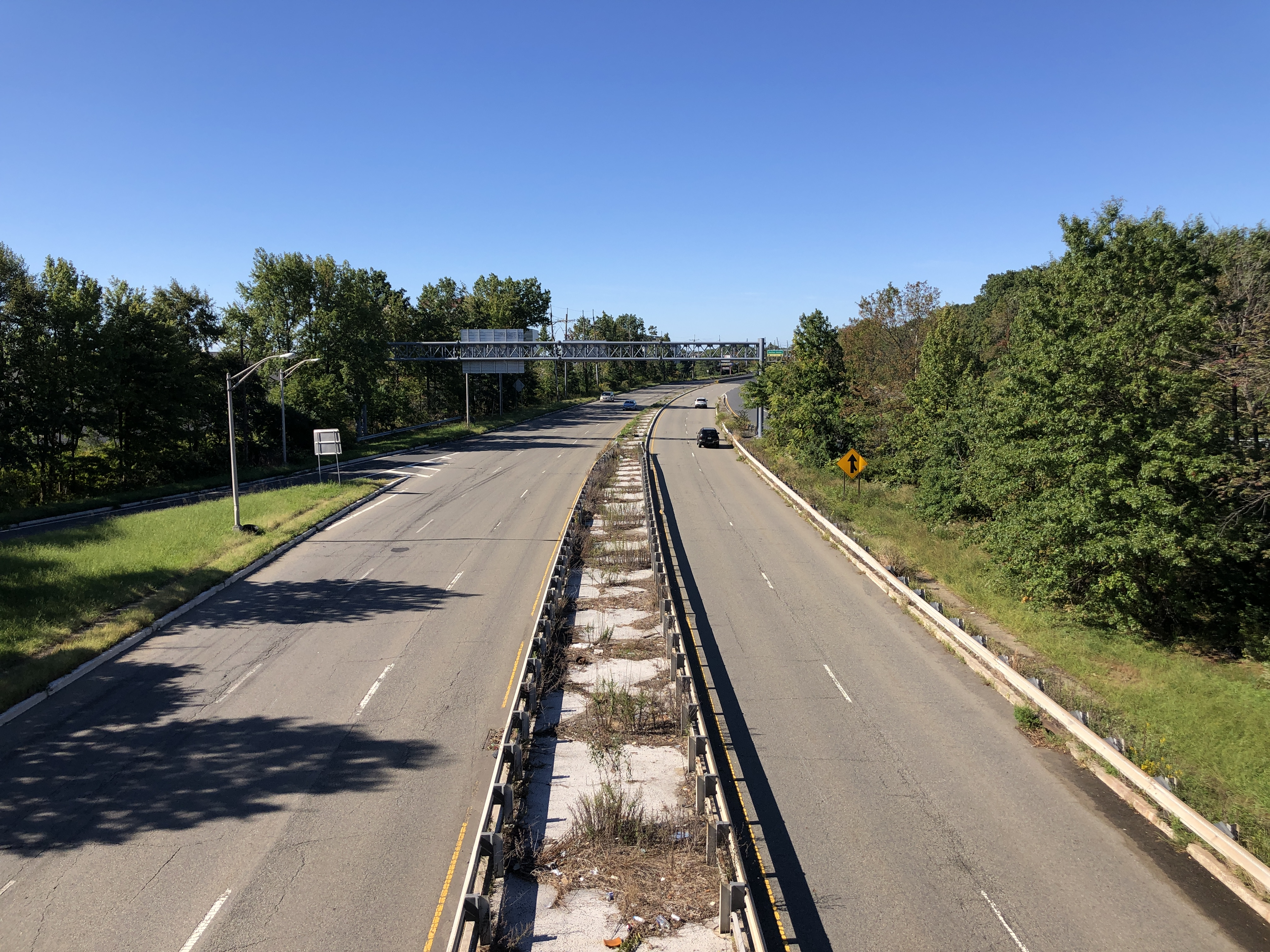
CR 514 westbound past Route 440 in Edison

CR 514 widens into a four-lane divided highway and passes over the New Jersey Turnpike (Interstate 95) before coming to an intersection of Mill Road (CR 667). Past this intersection, the route turns northeast and passes Middlesex College before running between residential areas to the northwest and commercial areas to the southeast. The road crosses Conrail Shared Assets Operations' Bonhamtown Industrial Track line and intersects with Main Street (CR 531), making a turn to the east. CR 514 turns northeast past more commercial development and intersects with Raritan Center Parkway before coming to an interchange complex that has access to the New Jersey Turnpike and Route 440, Interstate 287. Following this interchange, the route becomes undivided again and passes more businesses, crossing the intersection of Amboy Avenue (CR 501). The road narrows to two lanes at this point and continues into residential areas as it enters Woodbridge Township, where the name of the road becomes Main Street. CR 514 passes over both the New Jersey Turnpike and the Garden State Parkway simultaneously before heading into business areas as a four-lane road and reaching an interchange with U.S. Route 9. Here, the road becomes two lanes again and passes homes before heading into the commercial downtown of Woodbridge at the intersection of Amboy Avenue (Route 35). CR 514 passes under NJ Transit's North Jersey Coast Line near the Woodbridge Station prior to intersecting with Berry Street (CR 652) and turning north onto Rahway Avenue. The road heads northeast through a mix of residences and businesses and intersects with Green Street (CR 604. CR 604 joins the road for a short distance until it splits from CR 514 by heading northeast on Port Reading Avenue. The route crosses the Conrail Shared Assets Operations' Port Reading Secondary line prior to intersecting with Avenel Street (CR 650). Farther north, CR 514 crosses Conrail Shared Assets Operations' Supermarket Lead line and heads through industrial areas to the east of East Jersey State Prison.

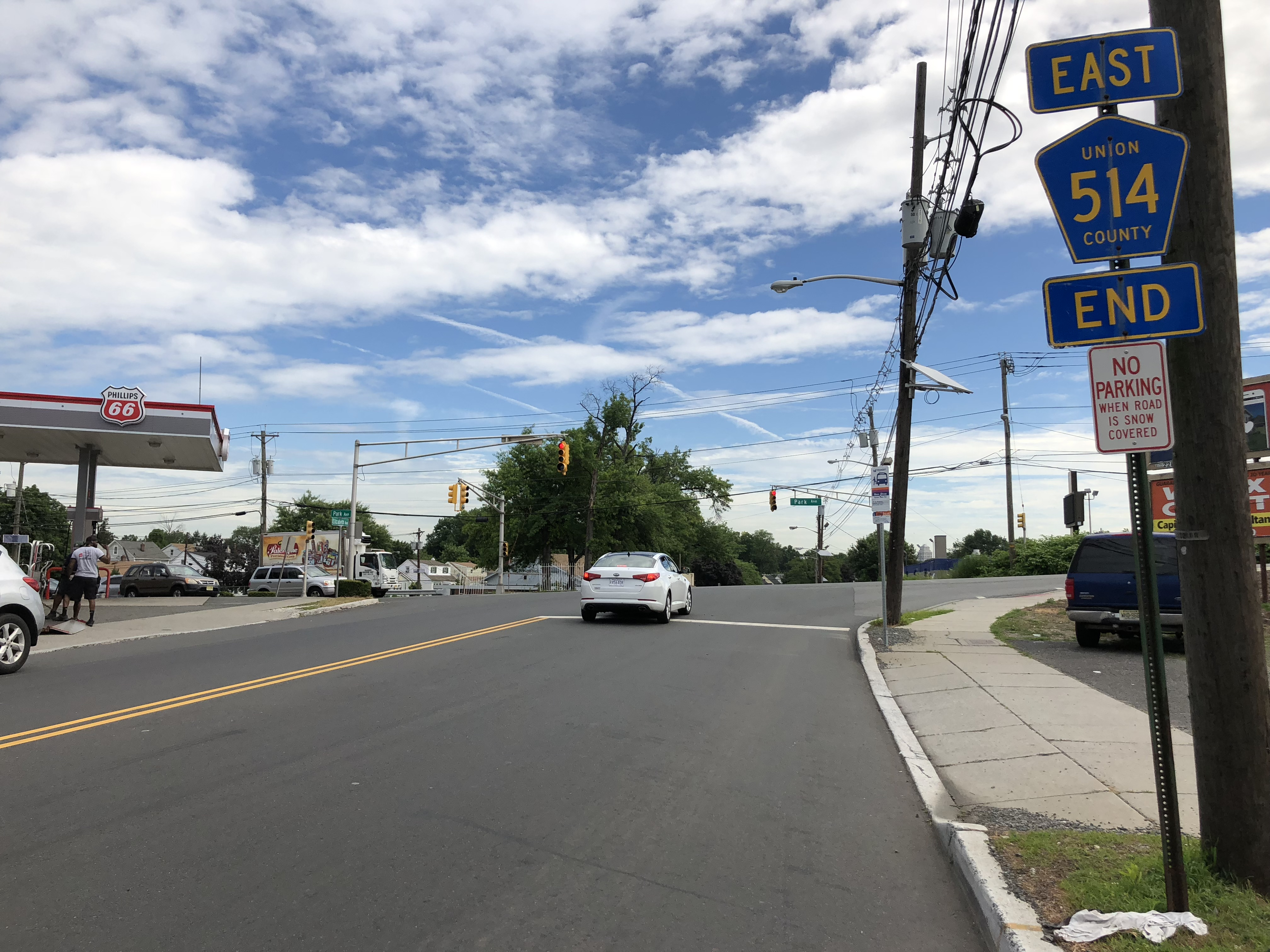
Signage for CR 514 in Linden at Park Avenue incorrectly signing it as its terminus

CR 514 continues into Rahway in Union County, becoming Woodbridge Road and becomes Lawrence Street, intersecting with East Hazelwood Avenue (CR 621) and passes a few homes before crossing the Rahway River and intersects the southbound direction of U.S. Route 1/9, with northbound US 1/9 passing over CR 514. From this point, the road continues past more residences, intersecting with East Milton Avenue (CR 648). At the intersection of CR 613, the route turns northwest onto East Grand Avenue and passes under the Northeast Corridor. CR 514 turns northeast onto Elizabeth Avenue, with CR 613 resuming along West Grand Avenue, and heads through residential and commercial areas a short distance to the northwest of the Northeast Corridor as it crosses CR 652. The route enters Linden and heads past industry as it crosses an abandoned railroad branch. The road intersects CR 615 and passes businesses as it comes to CR 617. CR 514 passes more homes and commercial establishments, intersecting CR 619 and crossing under an abandoned railroad line. The road runs through more urban areas of businesses and industry as it reaches the Park Avenue (CR 616) junction. The road becomes municipally maintained over the Northeast Corridor before turning east onto county-maintained East Linden Avenue. CR 514 continues into Elizabeth on Lidgerwood Avenue passing Elmora Avenue (Route 439). Past Garden Street, the street becomes one-way in the westbound direction. The CR 514 designation ends at the intersection of Edgar Road and Washington Avenue.

== History ==
From New Brunswick to Rahway, CR 514 follows the Woodbridge Turnpike, legislated in 1808. A spur to the Blazing Star Ferry in Carteret was also legislated, which is now Port Reading Avenue.

Prior to the 600-series county route designations, CR 514 in Middlesex County was designated as County Route 1R2. Though not signed as such, CR 514 was formerly routed along Easton Avenue (CR 527) south of Hamilton Street, and then Albany Street (Route 27), in downtown New Brunswick.

Near its eastern terminus in Elizabeth, CR 514 continued further into the city's downtown. Because of the one-way Lidgerwood Avenue past Elmora Avenue, eastbound CR 514 traveled south on Kenneth Avenue before proceeding northeast on Edgar Road. The two directions continued on Washington Avenue before heading west on Pearl Street where it ended at Rahway Avenue (Route 27). The NJDOT straight line diagrams had also previously listed CR 514 continuing east of Park Avenue in Linden along Elizabeth Avenue and Fay Avenue ending at Route 439.

Two former spur routes of County Route 514 existed. The first County Route 514 Spur in Hunterdon County ran along what is now Hunterdon County Routes 613 and 650. The second County Route 514 Spur ran along what is now Middlesex County Route 622.

== Major intersections ==
County	Location	mi	km	Destinations	Notes
Hunterdon	East Amwell Township	0.00	0.00	US 202 / Route 31 / Route 179 south (Old York Road) – Lambertville, Flemington, Ringoes	Western terminus; northern terminus of Route 179
Somerset	Hillsborough Township	8.94	14.39	CR 567 north	Southern terminus of CR 567
Somerset	Hillsborough Township	13.21	21.26	US 206 – Somerville, Princeton	
Somerset	Hillsborough Township	13.78– 13.91	22.18– 22.39	US 206 Byp. (Peter J. Biondi Bypass)	Interchange
Somerset	Millstone	16.22	26.10	CR 533 Spur north	Southern terminus of CR 533 Spur
Somerset	Millstone	16.41	26.41	CR 533 (Main Street)	
Middlesex	New Brunswick	24.35	39.19	CR 527 (Easton Avenue)	
Middlesex	New Brunswick	25.01	40.25	Route 27 south (Albany Street)	Western end of Route 27 concurrency
Middlesex	New Brunswick	25.05	40.31	Route 18 south (Memorial Parkway)	Interchange
Middlesex	Raritan River	25.14	40.46	Albany Street Bridge	
Middlesex	Highland Park	25.97	41.79	Route 27 north (Raritan Avenue)	Eastern end of Route 27 concurrency
Middlesex	Edison	26.87	43.24	US 1 – Woodbridge Township, Newark, Trenton	Interchange
Middlesex	Edison	27.34	44.00	CR 529 north (Plainfield Avenue)	Southern terminus of CR 529
Middlesex	Edison	29.99	48.26	CR 531 north (Main Street) to US 1 – Metuchen	Southern terminus of CR 531
Middlesex	Edison	30.76– 30.94	49.50– 49.79	Raritan Center	Interchange
Middlesex	Edison	31.34– 31.60	50.44– 50.86	I-95 Toll / N.J. Turnpike / I-287 north / Route 440 north to G.S. Parkway / US 9 – Perth Amboy, Staten Island	Southern termini of Interstate 287 and Route 440; exit 10 on Interstate 95 / New Jersey Turnpike
Middlesex	Edison	31.92	51.37	CR 501 (Amboy Avenue)	
Middlesex	Woodbridge Township	33.77	54.35	CR 646 (Woodbridge Center Drive)	Interchange
Middlesex	Woodbridge Township	34.20	55.04	US 9 to I-95 Toll / N.J. Turnpike / G.S. Parkway – Woodbridge, Shore Points	Interchange
Middlesex	Woodbridge Township	34.71	55.86	Route 35 (Amboy Avenue) – Rahway, South Amboy	
Union	Rahway	38.35	61.72	US 1-9 south	Interchange
Union	Elizabeth	43.17	69.48	Route 439 (South Elmore Avenue)	
Union	Elizabeth	43.42	69.88	Edgar Road / Washington Avenue	Eastern terminus; CR 514 travels westbound on a one-way street here
1.000 mi = 1.609 km; 1.000 km = 0.621 mi: Concurrency terminus; Incomplete access
