= County Route 525 (New Jersey) =

County highway in New Jersey, U.S.

County Route 525
- CR 525 highlighted in red

Route information
- Length: 16.88 mi (27.17 km)
- Existed: January 1, 1953–present

Major junctions
- South end: Route 28 in Bound Brook
- US 22 in Bridgewater Township; I-78 in Bernards Township; US 202 in Bernardsville
- North end: CR 510 in Mendham Borough

Location
- Country: United States
- State: New Jersey
- Counties: Somerset, Morris

Highway system
- County routes in New Jersey; 500-series routes
| ← CR 524 | → CR 526 |

County Route 525 (CR 525) is a county highway in the U.S. state of New Jersey. The highway extends 16.88 miles (27.17 km) from Union Avenue (Route 28) in Bound Brook to Main Street (CR 510) in Mendham Borough.

CR 525 begins with a couple of turns through Chimney Rock and Martinsville. From Interstate 78 to the northern terminus, CR 525 is mostly a two lane undivided road with some sections multi-laned. From Interstate 287 to the northern terminus, CR 525 has a solid northwest alignment.

== Route description ==
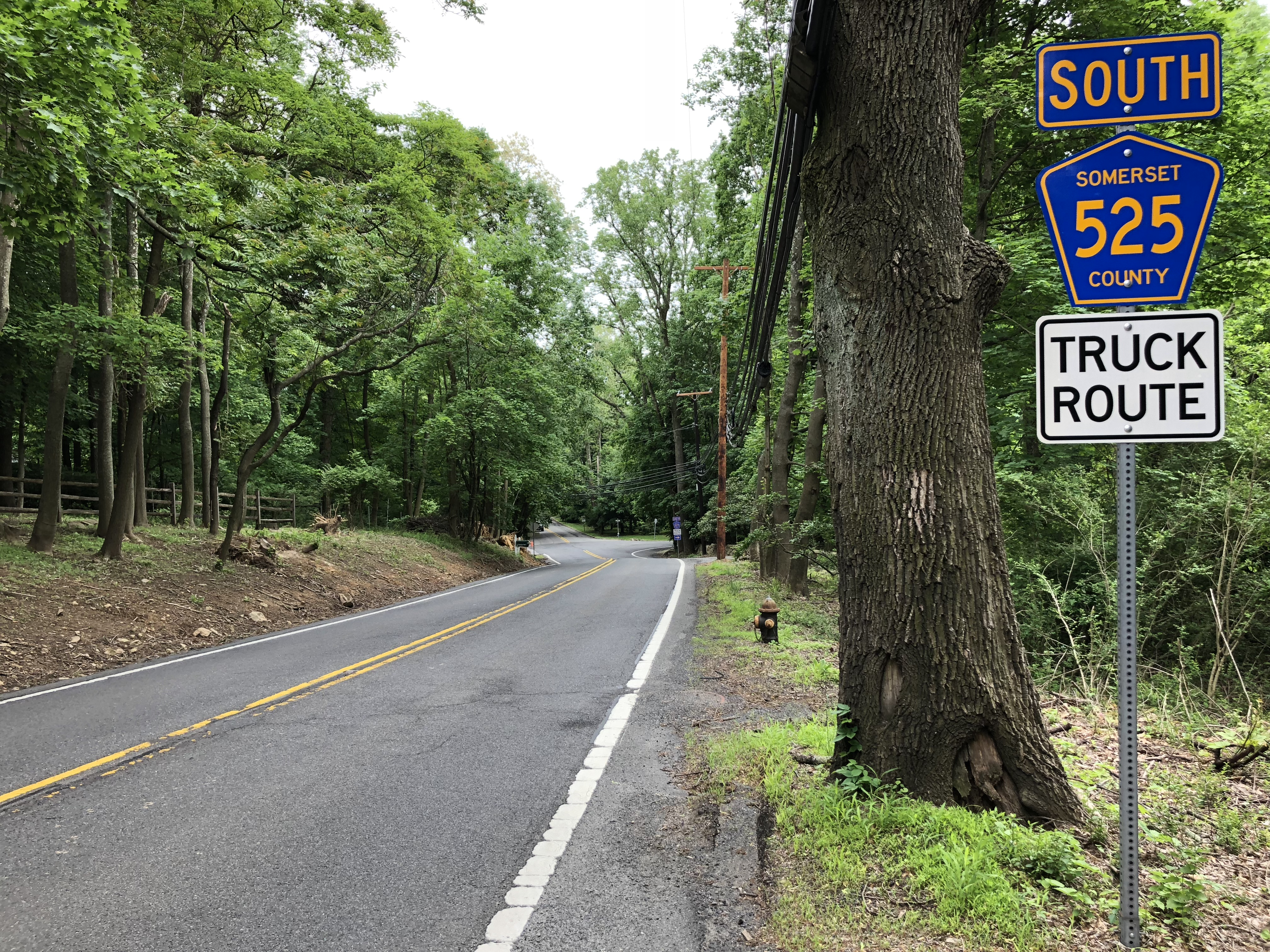
View south along CR 525 at Young Road in Bernardsville

CR 525 begins at Route 28 in Bound Brook, located 8 miles (13 km) northwest of New Brunswick in Somerset County. CR 525 begins as Thompson Avenue, approaching the village of Chimney Rock. In Chimney Rock, CR 525 meets U.S. Route 22, currently divided into two carriageways.

North of US 22, CR 525 continues its northern course through Chimney Rock and has a couple of wide turns. CR 525 enters Martinsville from the south as Chimney Rock Road. In Martinsville, CR 525 turns west on to Washington Valley Road before turning north onto Mount Horeb Road. Upon exiting Martinsville, CR 525 becomes Liberty Corner Road. Now in Bernards Township, CR 525 intersects Interstate 78 at exit 33. Briefly north of I-78, CR 525 is named Martinsville Road upon entering Liberty Corner. In Liberty Corner, CR 525 intersects County Route 512 while becoming Mount Airy Road. North of Liberty Corner, CR 525 changes its alignment to a northwest course while meeting with Interstate 287 at exit 26. Then, CR 525 changes to a more northerly alignment. In Bernardsville, CR 525 intersects U.S. Route 202. CR 525 briefly forms a concurrency with Route 202 before becoming Claremont Road north of Route 202. CR 525 then changes its name to Mendham Road while changing its course to the northwest in the process.

CR 525 enters Morris County as Bernardsville Road. CR 525 enters the borough of Mendham with a couple of wide turns before terminating at an intersection with County Route 510.

== History ==
Two spur routes of County Route 525 formerly existed. The first County Route 525 Spur ran along what is now Somerset County Route 640. The second County Route 525 Spur ran along what is now Somerset County Route 620.

== Major intersections ==
| County | Location | mi | km | Destinations | Notes |
|---|---|---|---|---|---|
| Somerset | Bound Brook | 0.00 | 0.00 | Route 28 (West Union Avenue) – Plainfield, Somerville | |
| Somerset | Bridgewater Township | 0.47– 0.72 | 0.76– 1.16 | US 22 – Somerville, New York City | Interchange |
| Somerset | Bernards Township | 6.30 | 10.14 | I-78 – Clinton, Newark | Exit 33 (I-78) |
| Somerset | Bernards Township | 7.21 | 11.60 | CR 512 (Valley Road) – Liberty Corner | |
| Somerset | Bernards Township | 9.35 | 15.05 | I-287 – Somerville, Morristown | Exit 26 (I-287) |
| Somerset | Bernardsville | 11.56 | 18.60 | US 202 north (Morristown Road) | Southern end of US 202 concurrency |
| Somerset | Bernardsville | 11.68 | 18.80 | US 202 south (Mine Brook Road) | Northern end of US 202 concurrency |
| Morris | Mendham Borough | 16.88 | 27.17 | CR 510 (Main Street) | |
1.000 mi = 1.609 km; 1.000 km = 0.621 mi: Concurrency terminus
