= List of 500-series county routes in New Jersey =

The following is a list of 500-series county routes in the U.S. state of New Jersey. For more information on the county route system in New Jersey as a whole, including its history, see County routes in New Jersey.

== 500-series county routes ==
Number	Length (mi)	Length (km)	Southern or western terminus	Northern or eastern terminus	Formed	Removed	Notes
CR 501	53.07	85.41	Stelton Road (CR 529) on the South Plainfield/Piscataway border	NY 340 at the New York state line in Rockleigh	—	—	Includes a gap along NY 440 in Staten Island
CR 502	23.79	38.29	Paterson–Hamburg Turnpike (CR 504) in Wayne	Palisades Boulevard (US 9W) in Alpine	1952	current	
CR 502 Truck	0.75	1.21	Hollywood Avenue (CR 502) and Franklin Turnpike (CR 507) in Ho-Ho-Kus)	Sheridan Avenue (CR 77) and Hollywood Avenue (CR 502) and in Ho-Ho-Kus	—	—	
CR 503	17.95	28.89	Paterson Plank Road (Route 120) in Carlstadt	South Pearl Street (NY 304) at the New York state line in Montvale	1952	current	
CR 504	15.94	25.65	Main Street (CR 655 Alt.) in Montville	2nd Avenue (Route 20) in Paterson	1952	current	
CR 505	20.64	33.22	Kennedy Boulevard (CR 501) in Union City	NY 303 at the New York state line in Northvale	1952	current	
CR 505 Truck	4.65	7.48	Sylvan Avenue (US 9W) and East Palisade Avenue (CR 505) in Englewood Cliffs	Engle Street (CR 501) and Palisade Avenue (CR 505) in Englewood	—	—	
CR 506	10.78	17.35	Bloomfield Avenue (Route 159) and Oak Road (Route 159) in Fairfield	Rutgers Street (Route 7) and McCarter Highway (Route 21) in Belleville	—	—	
CR 506 Spur	4.30	6.92	Highland Avenue (CR 506) in Glen Ridge	McCarter Highway (Route 21) in Newark	—	—	
CR 507	28.37	45.66	Harrison Avenue (CR 508) on the Kearny/Harrison town line	US 202 at the New York state line in Mahwah	1952	current	
CR 508	16.14	25.97	Mount Pleasant Avenue (Route 10) in Livingston	Belleville Turnpike (Route 7) in Kearny	—	—	
CR 508 Alt.	0.41	0.66	Private drive in Kearny	Private drive in Kearny	—	—	Former alignment of CR 508 near Route 7
CR 508 Spur	0.31	0.50	Northfield Avenue (CR 508) in West Orange	Main Street (CR 659) in West Orange	—	—	
CR 509	25.78	41.49	North Avenue (Route 28) in Westfield	North Straight Street (CR 504) in Paterson	1952	current	
CR 509 Spur	2.98	4.80	East Broad Street (CR 509) and Springfield Avenue (CR 509/CR 577) in Westfield	Morris Avenue (Route 82) in Springfield	—	—	Now part of CR 577
CR 510	29.58	47.60	North Road (CR 513) and Main Street (CR 513) in Chester Borough	McCarter Highway (Route 21) in Newark	—	—	
CR 511	37.44	60.25	Morris Street (CR 510) and Columbia Avenue (CR 510) in Morris Township	Jersey Avenue (NY 210) at New York state line in West Milford	1952	current	
CR 511 Alt.	9.77	15.72	Route 23/US 202 in Wayne	Union Avenue (CR 511) and Interstate 287 in Wanaque	1952	current	
CR 512	32.96	53.04	High Bridge Road (CR 513) in Califon	Springfield Avenue (CR 527) in Summit	—	—	
CR 513	66.83	107.55	Kingwood Avenue (Route 12) in Frenchtown	Lakeside Road (CR 511) in West Milford	1952	current	
CR 514	43.42	69.88	Old York Road (Route 179) and US 202/Route 31 in East Amwell Township	Edgar Road and Washington Avenue in Elizabeth	—	—	
CR 515	13.06	21.02	Route 23 in Hardyston Township	Prices Switch Road at New York state line in Vernon Township	—	—	
CR 516	19.27	31.01	Englishtown Road (CR 527) and Route 18 in Old Bridge Township	Route 36 in Middletown Township	—	—	
CR 516 Spur	0.30	0.48	Green Grove Avenue (CR 516) and Maple Place (CR 516) in Keyport	1st Street (CR 6) in Keyport	—	—	
CR 517	53.86	86.68	Lamington Road (CR 523) in Tewksbury Township	Glenwood Road (CR 26) at the New York state line in Vernon Township	—	—	
CR 518	20.58	33.12	Old York Road (Route 29/Route 165) in Lambertville	Route 27 in Franklin Township	—	—	
CR 519	88.54	142.49	Daniel Bray Highway (Route 29) and Risler Street (Route 29) in Delaware Township	Mountain Road (CR 55) at the New York state line in Wantage Township	—	—	
CR 520	22.39	36.03	Englishtown Road (CR 527) in Old Bridge Township	Ocean Avenue (Route 36) in Sea Bright	—	—	
CR 521	43.71	70.34	High Street (CR 519) and Hope–Bridgeville Road (CR 519) in Hope Township	South Maple Avenue (CR 16) at the New York state line in Montague Township	—	—	
CR 522	20.99	33.78	Route 27 in South Brunswick	West Main Street (CR 537) in Freehold Borough	—	—	
CR 523	29.55	47.56	Main Street (Route 29) in Stockton	US 202 in Bedminster	—	—	
CR 524	39.90	64.21	South Broad Street (US 206) and White Horse Avenue (CR 533) in Hamilton Township	Route 71 in Spring Lake Heights	—	—	
CR 524A	3.74	6.02	CR 524 in Howell Township	Lakewood-Farmingdale Road (CR 524/CR 547) and Allaire Road (CR 524) in Howell Township	—	—	
CR 524 Spur	3.39	5.46	Allenwood Road (CR 524) in Wall Township	Broad Street (CR 20) in Manasquan	—	—	
CR 525	16.88	27.17	Union Avenue (Route 28) in Bound Brook	West Main Street (CR 510) and East Main Street (CR 510) in Mendham	—	—	
CR 526	35.56	57.23	Princeton–Hightstown Road (CR 571) in West Windsor	Lanes Mill Road (CR 549) in Lakewood Township	—	—	Signed along CR 571 to Nassau Street (Route 27) in Princeton
CR 526 Spur	0.44	0.71	Allentown–Lakewood Road (CR 526) in Upper Freehold Township	Old York Road (CR 524/CR 539) in Upper Freehold Township	—	—	
CR 527	84.86	136.57	Water Street (CR 549) and Main Street (Route 166) in Toms River	Pompton Avenue (Route 23) in Cedar Grove	—	—	
CR 527A	5.92	9.53	Smithburg Road (CR 527) and Sweetmans Lane (CR 527/CR 1) in Millstone Township	Park Avenue (CR 527) and Main Street (CR 527) in Englishtown	—	—	
CR 528	39.89	64.20	Farnsworth Avenue (CR 545) in Bordentown	Ocean Avenue (Route 35) in Mantoloking	—	—	
CR 528 Truck	5.64	9.08	Jacobstown–New Egypt Road (CR 528) and Monmouth Road (CR 537) in North Hanover	Lakewood–New Egypt Road (CR 528) and Pinehurst Road (CR 539) in Plumsted Township	—	—	
CR 529	10.57	17.01	Woodbridge Avenue (CR 514) in Edison	Mountain Boulevard (CR 527) in Watchung	—	—	
CR 530	31.21	50.23	US 206 and Route 38 in Southampton	Main Street (Route 166) and Herflicker Boulevard (Route 166) in Toms River	—	—	
CR 531	13.61	21.90	Woodbridge Avenue (CR 514) in Edison	Valley Road (CR 512) and Mountain Avenue (CR 638) in Long Hill Township	—	—	
CR 532	35.19	56.63	Stokes Road (CR 541) on the Medford/Medford Lakes border	Bryan Road (US 9) in Ocean Township	—	—	
CR 533	32.78	52.75	South Broad Street (US 206/CR 524) in Hamilton	Lincoln Boulevard (CR 607) on the Middlesex County line in Bound Brook	—	—	
CR 533 Spur	0.45	0.72	Millstone Bypass (CR 514) in Millstone	Millstone River Road (CR 533) in Hillsborough	—	—	
CR 534	22.80	36.69	Cooper Street on Woodbury/Deptford Township border	Indian Mills Road (CR 620) in Shamong Township	—	—	
CR 535	32.31	52.00	East State Street (CR 635), North Logan Avenue, and South Logan Avenue at the Trenton/Hamilton Township border	US 9/Route 35 and Raritan Street (CR 686 Spur) in South Amboy	—	—	
CR 536	38.79	62.43	US 322 at the Pennsylvania state line in Logan Township	US 206 in Hammonton	—	—	
CR 536A	1.30	2.09	US 322/US 322 Bus./Route 45/CR 536 in Harrison Township	US 322/US 322 Bus./CR 536 in Harrison Township	—	—	Concurrently with US 322 its entire length
CR 536 Spur	7.95	12.79	Black Horse Pike (US 322/Route 42) in Monroe Township	Hopewell Road on the Waterford/Evesham township line	—	—	
CR 537	66.22	106.57	Delaware Avenue (CR 737) in Camden	Oceanport Avenue (CR 11) in Oceanport	—	—	
CR 537 Spur	1.08	1.74	Delaware Avenue (CR 737) in Camden	Federal Street (CR 537) in Camden	—	—	
CR 538	24.10	38.79	Kings Highway (CR 551) in Swedesboro	Black Horse Pike (US 322) in Monroe Township	—	—	
CR 539	54.32	87.42	Main Street (US 9) in Tuckerton	Old Trenton Road (CR 685) and South Main Street (CR 535) in Cranbury	—	—	
CR 539 Alt.	1.47	2.37	CR 539 in Upper Freehold Township	Allentown–Red Valley Road (CR 526) in Upper Freehold Township	—	—	
CR 540	43.16	69.46	Wiley Road (US 40) and Slapes Corner Road (Route 140) in Carneys Point Township	Harding Highway (US 40) in Buena Vista Township	—	—	
CR 541	23.84	38.37	US 206 in Shamong Township	US 130/CR 543 in Burlington	—	—	
CR 541 Truck	1.49	2.40	Cadillac Road in Burlington Township	Jacksonville Road (CR 670) in Burlington	—	—	
CR 542	20.57	33.10	12th Street (Route 54) in Hammonton	US 9 in Bass River Township	—	—	
CR 543	28.77	46.30	Federal Street (CR 537) in Camden	Wrightstown–Georgetown Road (CR 545) in Mansfield Township	—	—	
CR 544	14.94	24.04	Cooper Street (CR 534) in Deptford	Taunton Boulevard (CR 623) in Medford	—	—	
CR 545	14.76	23.75	Lakehurst Road (CR 530) in Pemberton Township	Park Avenue (CR 662) in Bordentown	—	—	Section through Fort Dix not open to public
CR 546	9.98	16.06	Route 29 in Hopewell Township	US 1 in Lawrence Township	—	—	
CR 547	30.36	48.86	Route 70 in Lakehurst	Myrtle Avenue and Broadway in Long Branch	—	—	
CR 547 Spur	0.45	0.72	Route 34 in Wall Township	Route 33 and Shafto Road (CR 547) in Wall Township	—	—	
CR 548	9.18	14.77	Delsea Drive (Route 47) in Maurice River Township	Route 49 in Upper Township	—	—	
CR 549	17.82	28.68	Main Street (Route 166) in Toms River	Lakewood–Farmingdale Road (CR 547) in Howell Township	—	—	
CR 549 Spur	3.97	6.39	Lakewood Road (Route 88) in Point Pleasant	Sally Ike Road (CR 549) in Brick Township	—	—	
CR 549 Spur	4.09	6.58	Route 37 in Toms River	Hooper Avenue (CR 549) in Toms River	—	—	
CR 550	15.92	25.62	Delsea Drive (Route 47) in Maurice River Township	US 9 in Dennis Township	—	—	
CR 550 Spur	4.84	7.79	Delsea Drive (Route 47) in Dennis Township	Hoffman Mill Road (CR 550) in Dennis Township	—	—	
CR 551	34.57	55.64	South Broadway (Route 49) in Pennsville Township	I-676/US 30 in Camden	—	—	
CR 551 Spur	4.27	6.87	Broadway (US 130) in Brooklawn	Kings Highway (Route 41) and Clements Bridge Road (Route 41/CR 573) in Haddonfield	—	—	
CR 552	27.48	44.22	Laurel Street (CR 606) in Bridgeton	Harding Highway (US 40) in Hamilton Township	—	—	
CR 552 Spur	3.41	5.49	Third Street (CR 555) in Millville	Sherman Avenue (CR 552) and Mays Landing Road (CR 552) in Vineland	—	—	
CR 553	51.22	82.43	Hands Landing Road in Commercial Township	Broadway (CR 551) in Deptford Township	—	—	
CR 553 Alt.	6.19	9.96	Main Street (CR 553) and Donald Barger Boulevard (CR 553) in Glassboro	Bridgeton Pike (Route 45) in Mantua Township	—	—	
CR 554	6.07	9.77	Route 72 in Barnegat Township	Main Street (US 9) in Barnegat Township	—	—	
CR 555	34.20	55.04	Port Norris Road (CR 553) in Downe Township	Black Horse Pike (Route 42) in Washington Township	—	—	
CR 557	36.15	58.18	Delsea Drive (Route 47) in Dennis Township	Main Street (CR 555) and Malaga Road (CR 555) in Franklin Township	—	—	
CR 557 Truck	19.62	31.58	CR 557 in Estell Manor	Harding Highway (US 40/CR 557) in Buena Vista Township	—	—	
CR 559	30.84	49.63	MacArthur Boulevard (Route 52) in Somers Point	Egg Harbor Road (CR 561) in Hammonton	—	—	
CR 559 Alt.	9.49	15.27	Shore Road (CR 585) on the Linwood/Somers Point border	Somers Point–Mays Landing Road (CR 559) in Hamilton Township	—	—	
CR 559 Truck	1.90	3.06	Main Street (US 40/CR 559) and Cape May Avenue (Route 50) in Hamilton Township	Weymouth Road (CR 559) in Hamilton Township	—	—	
CR 560	5.05	8.13	SR 2019 at the Pennsylvania state line in Sandyston Township	US 206/CR 521 in Sandyston Township	—	—	
CR 561	50.95	82.00	New York Road (US 9) in Galloway Township	Federal Street (CR 537) in Camden	—	—	
CR 561 Alt.	15.79	25.41	Dead end in Galloway Township	Duerer Street (CR 561) in Mullica Township	—	—	
CR 561 Byp.	0.68	1.09	New York Road (US 9) in Galloway Township	Moss Mill Road (CR 561 Alternate) in Galloway Township	—	—	Designated by Atlantic County; not acknowledged by the New Jersey Department of Transportation
CR 561 Spur	8.50	13.68	Intersection of US 322 and Route 73 in Folsom	Route 73/CR 561 in Winslow Township	—	—	Concurrently with Route 73 its entire length
CR 563	43.87	70.60	Ventnor Avenue (CR 629) in Margate City	Route 72 in Woodland Township	—	—	
CR 565	17.86	28.74	Intersection of US 206 and Route 15 in Frankford Township	McAfee–Glenwood Road (CR 517) in Vernon Township	—	—	
CR 567	10.02	16.13	Amwell Road (CR 514) in Hillsborough Township	Union Avenue (Route 28) in Raritan Borough	—	—	
CR 569	8.53	13.73	Quakerbridge Road (CR 533) in Lawrence Township	Broad Street (CR 518) in Hopewell	—	—	
CR 571	43.96	70.75	Route 37 in Toms River	Nassau Street (Route 27) in Princeton	—	—	
CR 573	5.73	9.22	Black Horse Pike (Route 168) in Runnemede	Brace Road (Route 154) in Cherry Hill	—	—	Concurrently with Route 41 its entire length
CR 575	20.96	33.73	Somers Point–Mays Landing Road (CR 559) in Egg Harbor Township	New York Road (US 9) in Port Republic	—	—	
CR 577	13.10	21.08	East Broad Street (CR 509) and Springfield Avenue (CR 509) in Westfield	Bloomfield Avenue (CR 506) in Verona	—	—	
CR 579	37.24	59.93	John Fitch Parkway (Route 29) in Trenton	Route 173 in Greenwich Township	—	—	
CR 581	17.57	28.28	Main Street (Route 49) in Quinton Township	Bridgeton Pike (Route 77) in Harrison Township	—	—	
CR 583	9.11	14.66	Calhoun Street (US 206) in Trenton	Nassau Street (Route 27) in Princeton	—	—	
CR 585	9.57	15.40	MacArthur Boulevard (Route 52) in Somers Point	Absecon Boulevard (US 30) and North Shore Road (Route 157) in Absecon	—	—	
