= County Route 567 (New Jersey) =

County highway in New Jersey, U.S.

County Route 567
- CR 567 highlighted in red

Route information
- Length: 10.02 mi (16.13 km)
- Existed: January 1, 1953–present

Major junctions
- South end: CR 514 in Hillsborough Township
- US 202 in Raritan
- North end: Route 28 in Raritan

Location
- Country: United States
- State: New Jersey
- Counties: Somerset

Highway system
- County routes in New Jersey; 500-series routes
← CR 565	→ CR 569

County Route 567 (CR 567) is a county highway in the U.S. state of New Jersey. The highway extends 10.02 miles (16.13 km) from Amwell Road (CR 514) in Hillsborough Township to Union Avenue (Route 28) in Raritan Borough.

== Route description ==
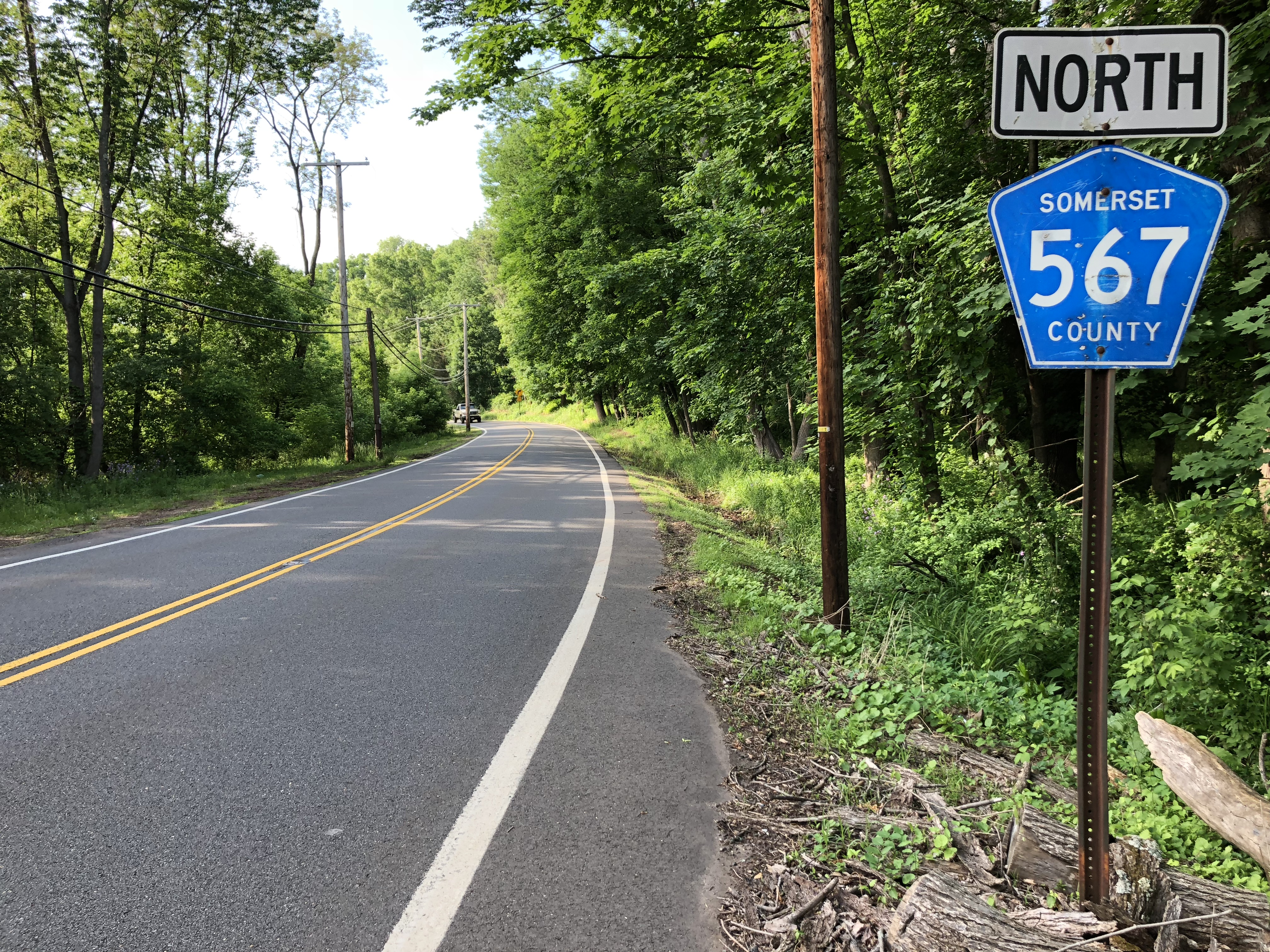
View north at the southern terminus of CR 567 at CR 514 in Hillsborough

CR 567 begins at an intersection with CR 514 in Hillsborough Township, heading north on two-lane undivided River Road (also known as Neshanic Station Road). The road runs through wooded areas before heading along the east bank of the South Branch Raritan River, intersecting CR 667 and passing under Norfolk Southern's Lehigh Line. The route runs near farms as it crosses the river and enters Branchburg Township. At this point, CR 567 intersects CR 667 again and becomes Pleasant Run Road before making a northeast turn onto South Branch Road, with CR 628 continuing northwest along Pleasant Run Road. Residential development increases as the route continues northeast and passes the Neshanic Valley Golf Course. CR 567 begins to run closer to the South Branch Raritan River again as it reaches a junction with CR 620. CR 567 passes north through some farm fields before turning northeast at an intersection with CR 646.

A short distance later, the route turns east onto Old York Road, with CR 637 heading west on that road to an intersection with US 202. CR 567 enters residential areas and crosses the North Branch Raritan River into Bridgewater Township. It parallels the Raritan River to the north as it continues into Raritan and becomes Somerset Avenue. In Raritan, CR 567 turns north onto First Avenue, with CR 626 continuing east on Somerset Avenue. The route crosses under New Jersey Transit’s Raritan Valley Line before reaching the US 202 intersection. Past US 202, CR 567 passes more homes before ending at Route 28.

== History ==
When it was first assigned, CR 567 formerly continued north from its present terminus at Route 28 along Country Club Road to US 22 in Bridgewater Township.

In Neshanic Station, CR 567 was originally routed over the South Branch Raritan River on the Neshanic Station Lenticular Truss Bridge (Elm Street Bridge). It traveled west on Elm Street, northwest on Maple Avenue, and north on Pleasant Run Road until rejoining its present alignment. Its current routing in the area was formed when a new bridge was built in 1979 north of Neshanic Station. The old route through Neshanic Station became Somerset County Route 667.

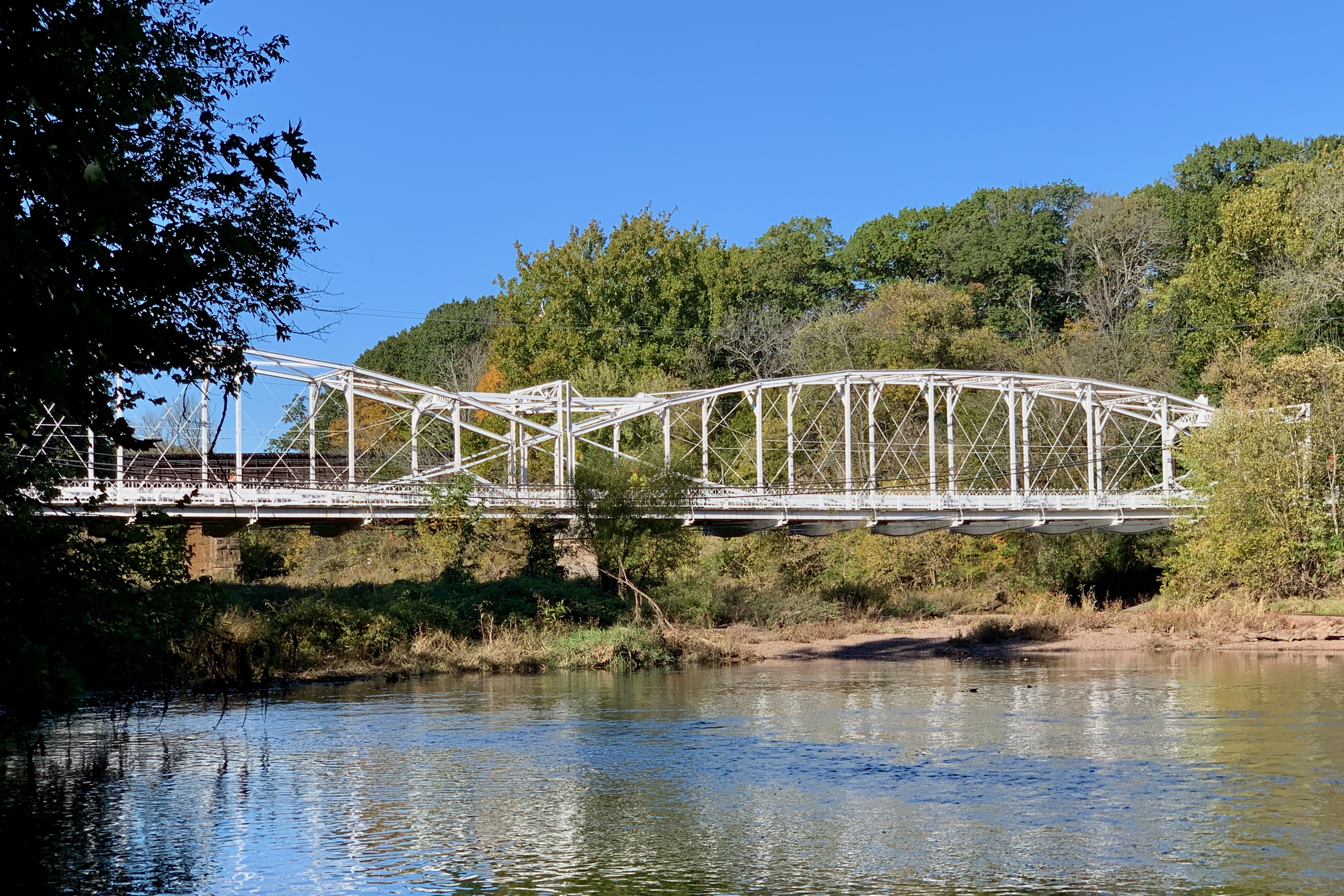
CR 567 was routed on the Neshanic Station Lenticular Truss Bridge (Elm Street Bridge) until 1979.

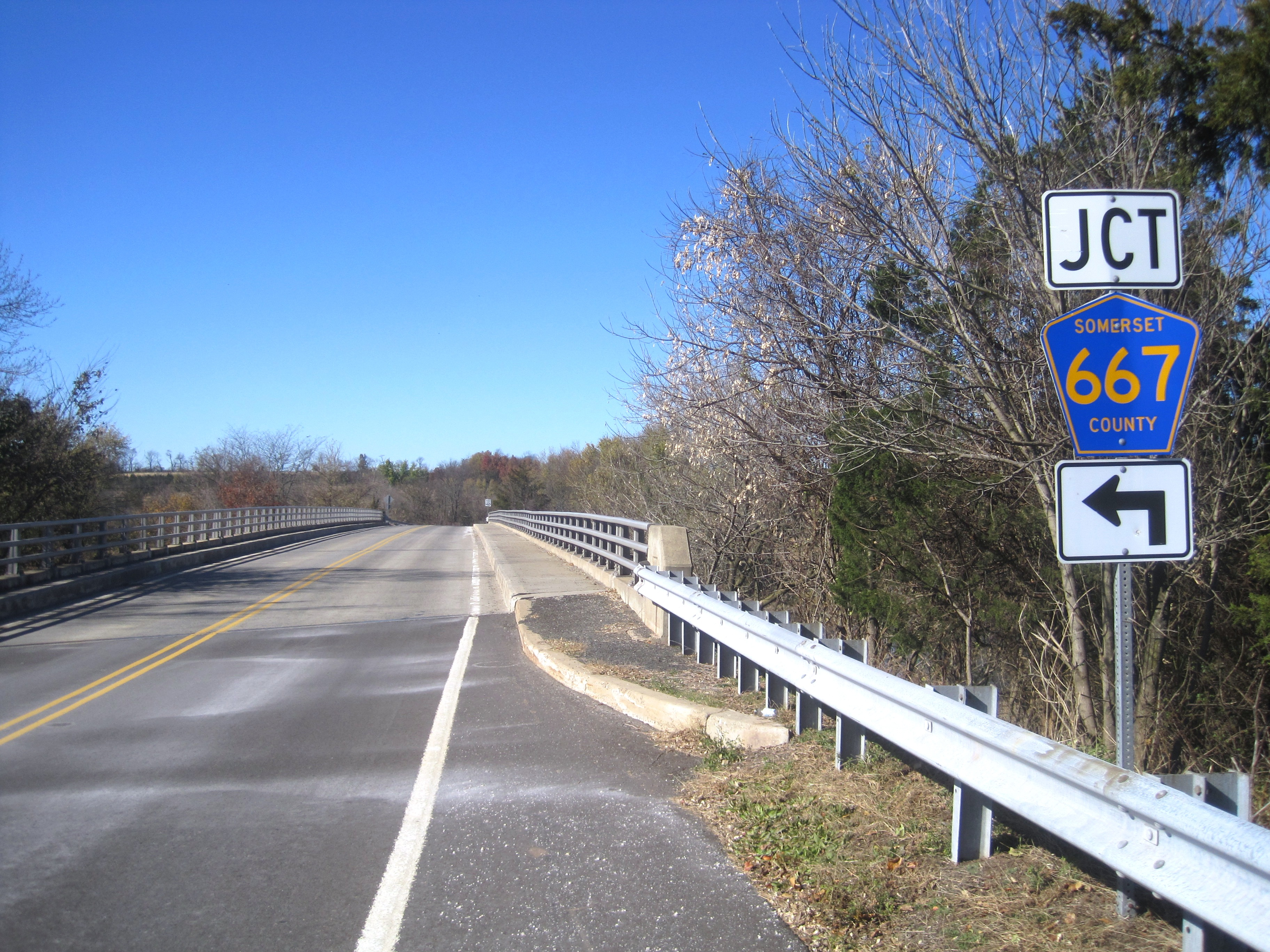
CR 567's bridge over the South Branch Raritan River facing north

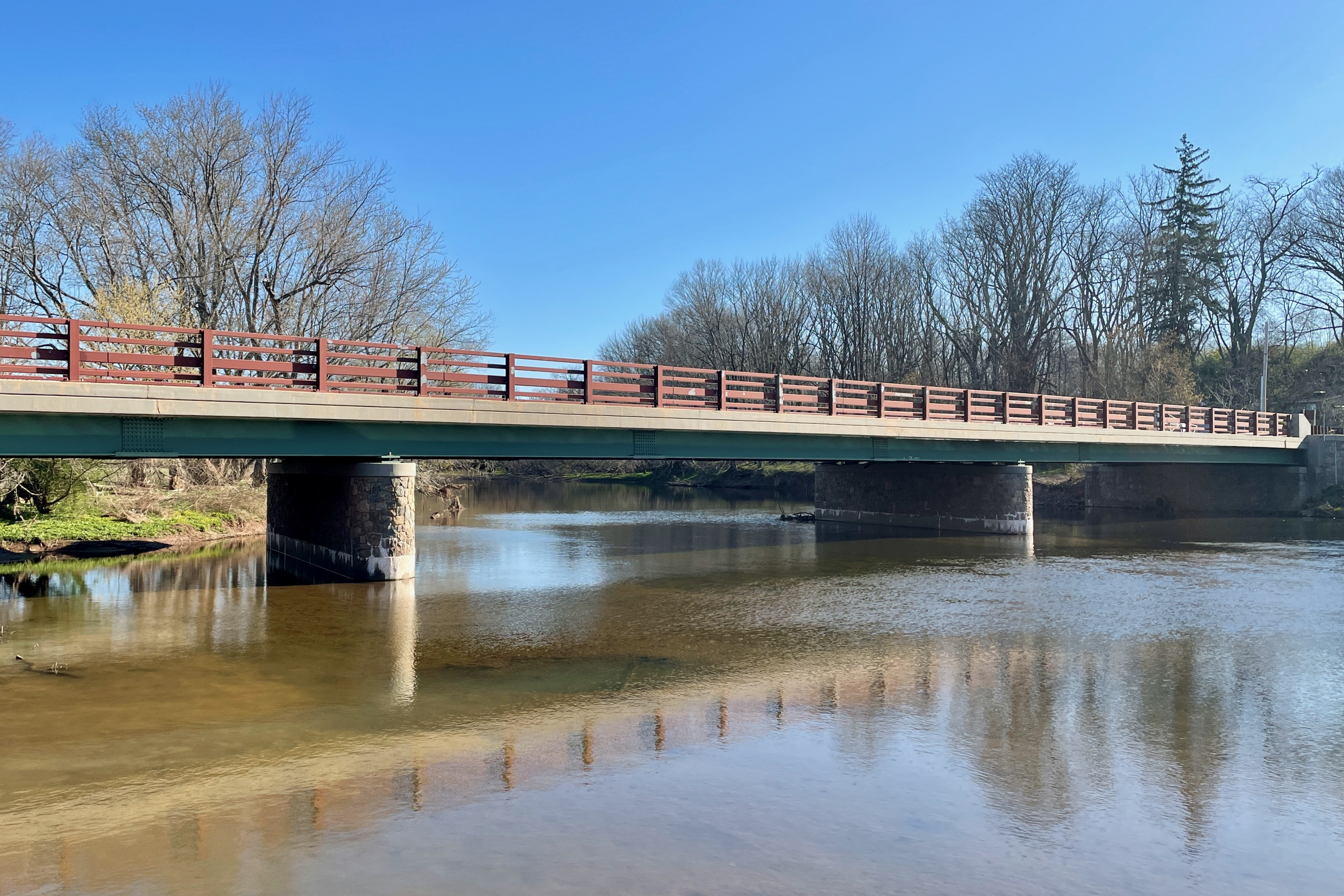
CR 567 (Old York Road) over the North Branch Raritan River

== Major intersections ==
The entire route is in Somerset County.

Location	mi	km	Destinations	Notes
Hillsborough Township	0.00	0.00	CR 514 (Amwell Road)	
Raritan	9.51	15.30	US 202 – Somerville, Flemington	
Raritan	10.02	16.13	Route 28 – North Branch, Dunellen	
1.000 mi = 1.609 km; 1.000 km = 0.621 mi
