= David T. Kenney =

David T. Kenney (April 3, 1866 – May 26?, 1922) was an inventor with nine patents, granted between 1903 and 1913, applicable to both machine-driven and manual vacuum cleaners, dominated the vacuum cleaner industry in the United States until the 1920s.

== Early life ==
Born to Irish immigrants, Kenney was apprenticed at age 15 to a plumber. In 1891 he began his own plumbing business in Plainfield, New Jersey and gained patents for flush toilets. From 1896 to his death he maintained offices in New York City. His businesses operated under the names Kenney Manufacturing Company and later Vacuum Cleaner Company in New York and Jersey Vacuum Cleaner Company in Newark. Kenney's first vacuum cleaner installation was in the building of Henry Clay Frick in Pittsburgh in 1902. Its stationary 4,000 lb. steam engine powered pipes and hoses reaching into all parts of the building. In 1906 his company claimed to have installed electric vacuum cleaning systems in the White House, the Times building, and elsewhere.

== Career ==
Kenney's most significant patent was granted in March 1907. He had filed the application in 1901, when the notion of an electrically powered cleaner was only beginning to be seen as a possibility. A Savannah woman, Corinne Dufour, who had a year earlier received a patent for an "Electric Carpet Sweeper and Dust Gatherer" whose motor was designed to operate a suction-fan, also is a forgotten figure. Kenney purchased one of the English inventor H. Cecil Booth's vacuum cleaners, and after the 1907 patent was granted, Booth withdrew his own application for a US patent. Litigation followed, and the Vacuum Cleaner Company as the holder of Kenney’s patents, was a party to several lawsuits in subsequent years. When the Vacuum Cleaner Manufacturers' Association was formed in 1919, its membership was entirely made up of licensees under the Kenney patents, "the basic vacuum cleaner patents." Though most such cleaners by this time were electric, they still depended on the mechanism devised and patented by him - the opening in the nozzle sealing contact with the carpet through a vacuum.

== Legacy ==
With the wealth derived from his patents, Kenney became a benefactor of Catholic institutions, particularly Mount St. Mary Academy in North Plainfield, New Jersey and was named a Papal Chamberlain in 1906. He was a prominent citizen of his community, and served on various boards in New Jersey. His last invention, patented in 1920, was for a heating system designed to improve the distribution of heat from a wood-burning fireplace. Booth's name appears in British reference works, and the vacuum cleaners he invented and manufactured are held in London's Science Museum. Kenney's name is not found in corresponding American reference books, nor are his machines in the Smithsonian Institution or other major collections. David Kenney committed suicide in 1922 after being in ill health himself and losing his wife and a sister.

== Sources ==
- Hoover Historical Center, 1875 East Maple Street, North Canton, OH 44720-3331
- Lifshey, Earl. The Housewares Story: A History of the American Housewares Industry. Chicago: National Housewares Manufacturers Association, 1973
- New York Times, 12/8/42 (Thomas Ewing obituary)
- Plainfield (NJ) Courier-News, 6/5/22 (Kenney obituary)
- Smiley, F.T. History of Plainfield and North Plainfield. Plainfield, NJ: The Plainfield Courier-News, 1901
- Strasser, Susan. Never Done: A History of American Housework. New York: Pantheon,1982. p. 79
- U.S. Federal Trade Commission. Report on the House Furnishings Industry. 1925
