= Anne Casale =

American cookbook author

- Anne Lovi (later Anne Casale) in a 1951 newspaper photograph
- Born: Anne Lucille Lovi; July 15, 1930; Perth Amboy, New Jersey, U.S.
- Died: December 2, 2002 (aged 72); Glendale, Arizona, U.S.
- Occupation(s): Cookbook author, cooking teacher, businesswoman

Anne Lovi Casale (July 15, 1930 – December 2, 2002) was an Italian-American cookbook author.

== Early life ==
Anne Lovi was born in Perth Amboy, New Jersey and raised in North Plainfield, New Jersey, the daughter of Amadeo M. Lovi and Rose F. Guarnieri Lovi. She had a twin sister, Louise. Her father ran a restaurant, and she worked in his kitchen as a girl. "I swore I would never get into food, and here I am," she recalled in 1988, while promoting her third cookbook. She graduated from North Plainfield High School in 1948, and attended a nearby secretarial school.

== Career ==
Casale began teaching cooking classes at her home in Watchung, New Jersey in the early 1960s, and ran a gift shop in North Plainfield, Bazaar Bizarre, with her husband. From 1978 to 1985 she taught classes for adults, teens, and children at her own cooking school, Annie's Kitchen, originally part of the gift shop, and later in its own location. She was elected president of the New York Association of Cooking School Teachers in 1987, and held a certificate from the International Association of Culinary Professionals. She was a guest instructor at the Culinary Institute of America, the New York Cooking School, and other programs. Her teaching skills were recognized by the James Beard Foundation in 1988.

Casale wrote four cookbooks: Italian Family Cooking: Like Mama Used to Make (1984), The Long Life Cook Book: Delectable Recipes for Two (1988), Lean Italian Cooking (1994), and Lean Italian Meatless Meals (1995). In her recipes, she emphasized healthful adaptations of Italian-American favorites, with lower fat and salt content, more fresh herbs and vegetables, homemade pastas and sauces, and smaller portions.

== Personal life ==
Anne Lovi married John Vincent Casale in 1952. They had two daughters, Joanne and Amy. In addition to her culinary career, Casale acted in amateur theatrical productions. Anne Casale died in 2002, at her home in Glendale, Arizona.
