= Pete Carmichael =

American football player (1941–2016)

Biographical details
- Born: March 4, 1941; Plainfield, New Jersey, U.S.
- Died: January 22, 2016 (aged 74); Mendon, Massachusetts, U.S.

Playing career

Football
- 1961–1962: Montclair State
- Position: Quarterback

Coaching career (HC unless noted)

Football
- 1963: Watchung Hills Regional HS (NJ) (line)
- 1964: Arthur L. Johnson HS (NJ) (backfield)
- 1965: VMI (DB)
- 1965: Madison HS (NJ) (DC)
- 1967: Trenton State (assistant)
- 1968–1972: Boston College (DB)
- 1973: Trenton State
- 1974–1976: Columbia (DC)
- 1977–1980: Merchant Marine
- 1981–1990: Boston College (DB)
- 1991–1993: Boston College (WR)
- 1995–1999: Jacksonville Jaguars (WR)
- 2000: Cleveland Browns (OC)
- 2001–2003: Chicago Bears (OA)
- 2004: Pittsburgh (WR)
- 2005–2006: Louisiana Tech (WR)
- 2008: Holy Cross (RB)

Baseball
- 1973: Trenton State

Head coaching record
- Overall: 16–34–1 (football); 8–7 (baseball)

Peter Edwards Carmichael Sr. (March 4, 1941 – January 22, 2016) was an American football coach who had more than 40 years of coaching experience at the high school, collegiate, and professional levels. He served as the head football coach at Trenton State College in 1973, and the United States Merchant Marine Academy from 1977 to 1980.

Born in Plainfield, New Jersey, Carmichael was raised in North Plainfield and played both baseball and football at North Plainfield High School.

In 1995, Carmichael was on the inaugural coaching staff for the Jacksonville Jaguars of the National Football League (NFL), where he served as the wide receivers coach.

Carmichael died on January 22, 2016. His son, Pete Carmichael Jr., is an offensive coordinator for the Buffalo Bills.

== Head coaching record ==
=== Football ===
Year	Team	Overall	Conference	Standing	Bowl/playoffs
Trenton State Lions (New Jersey State Athletic Conference) (1973)
1973	Trenton State	7–3	3–2	3rd	
Trenton State:		7–3	3–2		
Merchant Marine Mariners (Metropolitan Intercollegiate Conference) (1977)
1977	Merchant Marine	3–6	1–2	4th	
Merchant Marine Mariners (NCAA Division II independent) (1978–1980)
1978	Merchant Marine	5–5			
1979	Merchant Marine	1–9–1			
1980	Merchant Marine	0–11			
Merchant Marine:		9–31–1	1–2		
Total:		16–34–1			
