= Bill Feaster =

American football player (1904–1950)

Personal information
- Born: 1904; New Jersey, U.S.
- Died: December 11, 1950 (aged 45–46); Plainfield, New Jersey, U.S.
- Listed height: 6 ft 0 in (1.83 m)
- Listed weight: 205 lb (93 kg)

Career information
- High school: North Plainfield (NJ); St. Benedict's Prep (NJ)
- College: Fordham

Career history
- Orange Tornadoes (1929); Newark Tornadoes (1930)

Career statistics
- Games played: 22
- Stats at Pro Football Reference

William George Feaster Jr. (1904 – December 11, 1950) was an American professional football player who spent two seasons in the National Football League with the Orange Tornadoes and the Newark Tornadoes from 1929 to 1930. Feaster appeared in 22 career games, while making 20 starts.

Raised in North Plainfield, New Jersey, he played prep football at North Plainfield High School and at St. Benedict's Preparatory School.
