= The Ice House (1969 film) =

1969 American film by Stuart E. McGowan

- Directed by: Stuart E. McGowan
- Produced by: Dorrell McGowan
- Starring: David Story; Robert Story; Jim Davis; Sabrina
- Cinematography: William G. Troiano
- Edited by: Irwin Cadden
- Music by: Gene Kauer; Douglas Lackey
- Production company: C-B Productions
- Distributed by: Orbit Media Group, USA, 1969; Marden Films, Canada, 1972; Something Weird Video, VHS, 1996; Grindhouse Releasing Director's cut, 2008
- Release date: July 9, 1969 (United States)
- Running time: 85 minutes
- Country: United States
- Language: English

The Ice House (also known as Cold Blood, Crimen on the Rocks (Spain), Love in Cold Blood and The Passion Pit) is a 1969 American horror-thriller film directed by Stuart E. McGowan and starring the twin brothers David and Robert Story, Jim Davis, Scott Brady, Nancy Dow, Karen Lee, and Sabrina in her penultimate film role.

== Plot ==
Ric Martin, a disgraced cop, long since fired from police work, makes a sexual approach to Ice House dancer Venus De Marco and is struck with a beer bottle for his efforts. Angered, he stalks the dancer, and when she again raises a bottle in a defensive manner, he strangles her. He is thwarted in his efforts to hide the body at a local lovers' lane, and ends up hiding it at The Ice House, where he works in the menial position of attendant. Other women become his victims and their bodies are stored there as well. His identical twin brother Fred Martin, himself a cop and investigating the disappearances, cannot understand why his brother is acting oddly. In an effort to slow down the hunt for the serial killer, Ric kills Fred and takes his place investigating the case.

== Cast ==
- David Story as Fred Martin
- Robert Story as Ric Martin
- Jim Davis as Jake
- Scott Brady as Lt. Scott
- Nancy Dow as Jan Wilson
- Sabrina as Venus De Marco
- John Holmes as dancer
- Karen Lee as unknown
- Ken Osborn as killer
- Kelly Ross as Kandy Kane

== Production ==
The film's production began in early 1967, with director Stuart E. McGowan wanting blonde bombshell Jayne Mansfield to play Venus De Marco. However, after Mansfield's death in an automobile accident in June 1967, filming was postponed. Over the next year McGowan offered the role to Mamie Van Doren, Diana Dors and Joi Lansing, all of whom turned down the offer.c Eventually the role was filled by model-turned-actress Sabrina.

== Release ==
The film had its original United States release in the United States on July 9, 1969 by Orbit Media Group. Marden Films gave the film a theatrical release in Canada in 1972. The film was released on VHS in the USA by Something Weird Video in 1996 as part of Frank Henenlotter's Sexy Shockers from the Vaults (Vol. 60), and a fully restored director's cut was given a worldwide release in 2008 by Grindhouse Releasing.

== Critical response ==
John Charles, editor of Video Watchdog magazine, wrote: "Character actors Scott Brady, Jim Davis and Tris Coffin, and a pair of musclebound, thespically challenged leading men are the main points of interest in this thriller/softcore hybrid, which delivers little more than copious nudity." He panned the film for the poor direction of Stuart E. McGowan, and notes that while the film set up the viewer for mystery and horror, it failed to deliver and meandered to a predictable twist ending. He also panned the performances of real-life twins David and Robert Story as "incredibly stiff", and made note that "some amusingly unhip slang" and an undramatic "ridiculous" and "undercranked" motorcycle chase provided only "intermittent entertainment". While noting Grindhouse Releasing's intent to remarket the film, they spoke toward Something Weird Video's 1996 video release, and noted that although SWV's 35mm source material was "damaged in every way imaginable", its color and resolution were still decent.

== See also ==
- List of American films of 1969
