= Washington Park Historic District (North Plainfield, New Jersey) =

- U.S. National Register of Historic Places
- U.S. Historic district
- New Jersey Register of Historic Places
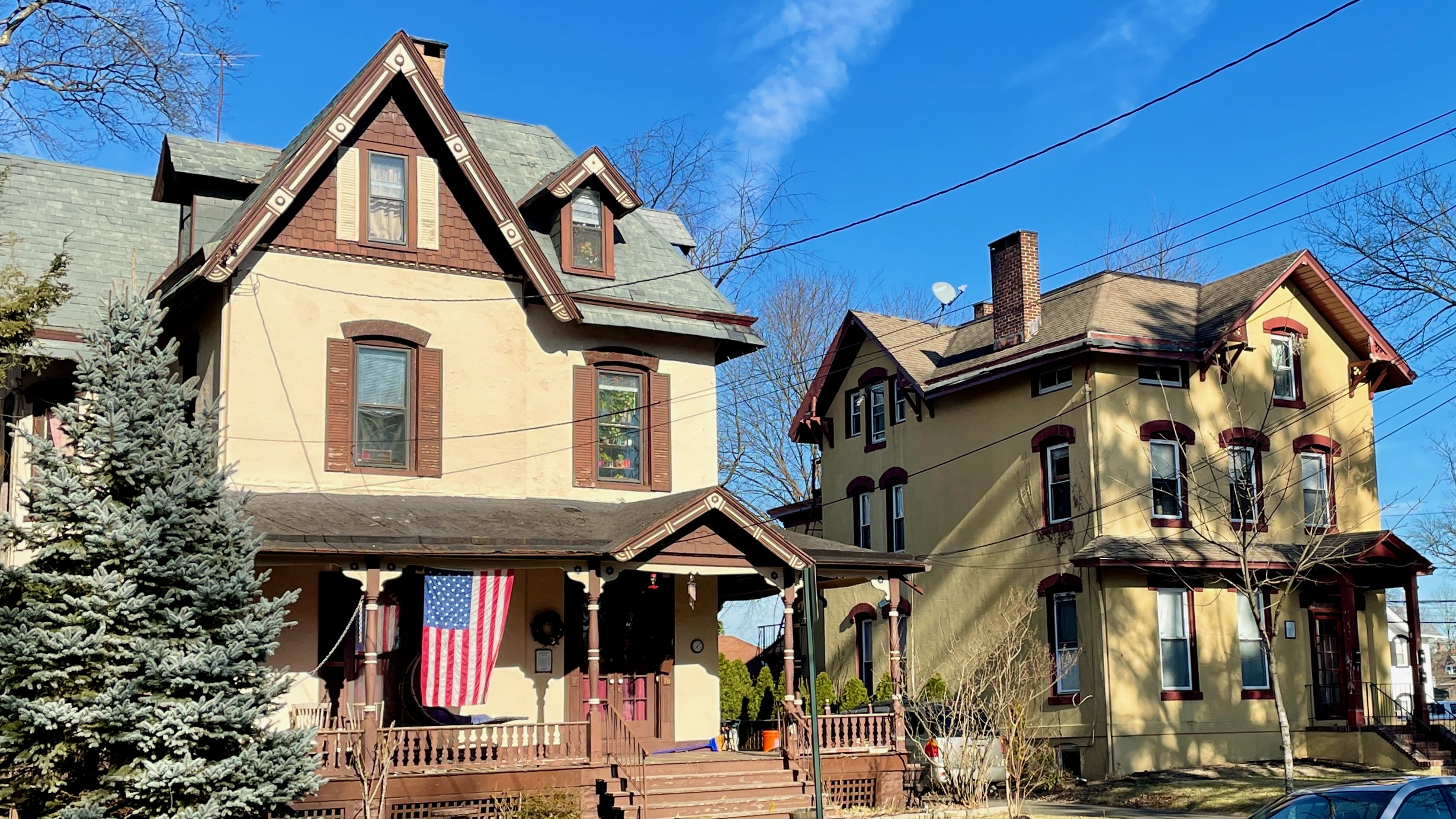
- Washington Park Builder's Houses

- Location within Somerset County, New Jersey Location within New Jersey Location within the United States
- Location: Roughly bounded by Green Brook Rd., Grove Ave., E. Front St., and Geraud Ave. North Plainfield, New Jersey
- Coordinates: 40°37′4″N 74°26′7″W
- Area: 100 acres (40 ha)
- Built: 1868
- Architect: Charles H. Smith
- Architectural style: Second Empire, Queen Anne, Shingle Style
- NRHP reference No.: 87000603
- NJRHP No.: 2574

Significant dates
- Added to NRHP: April 9, 1987
- Designated NJRHP: March 4, 1987

The Washington Park Historic District is a 100-acre (40 ha) historic district located in the borough of North Plainfield in Somerset County, New Jersey. It was added to the National Register of Historic Places on April 9, 1987, for its significance in architecture, landscape architecture, and community planning. Featuring houses built from 1868 to 1917, the district includes 145 contributing buildings.

== History and description ==
The district is in a residential area of North Plainfield, bordered by the Stony Brook, the Green Brook, and Grove Avenue. The houses display a variety of Late Victorian styles. The house at 11 Rockview Avenue was built in the 1860s as a Downingesque "Swiss" cottage. The houses at 12 and 16 Rockview Avenue were built 1882–1894 and feature Late Victorian Eclectic style. The house at 32 Rockview Avenue was built 1882–1894 with Second Empire style and features a mansard roof. The Church of the Holy Cross, an Episcopal Church, was built 1868–1869 with Carpenter Gothic style.

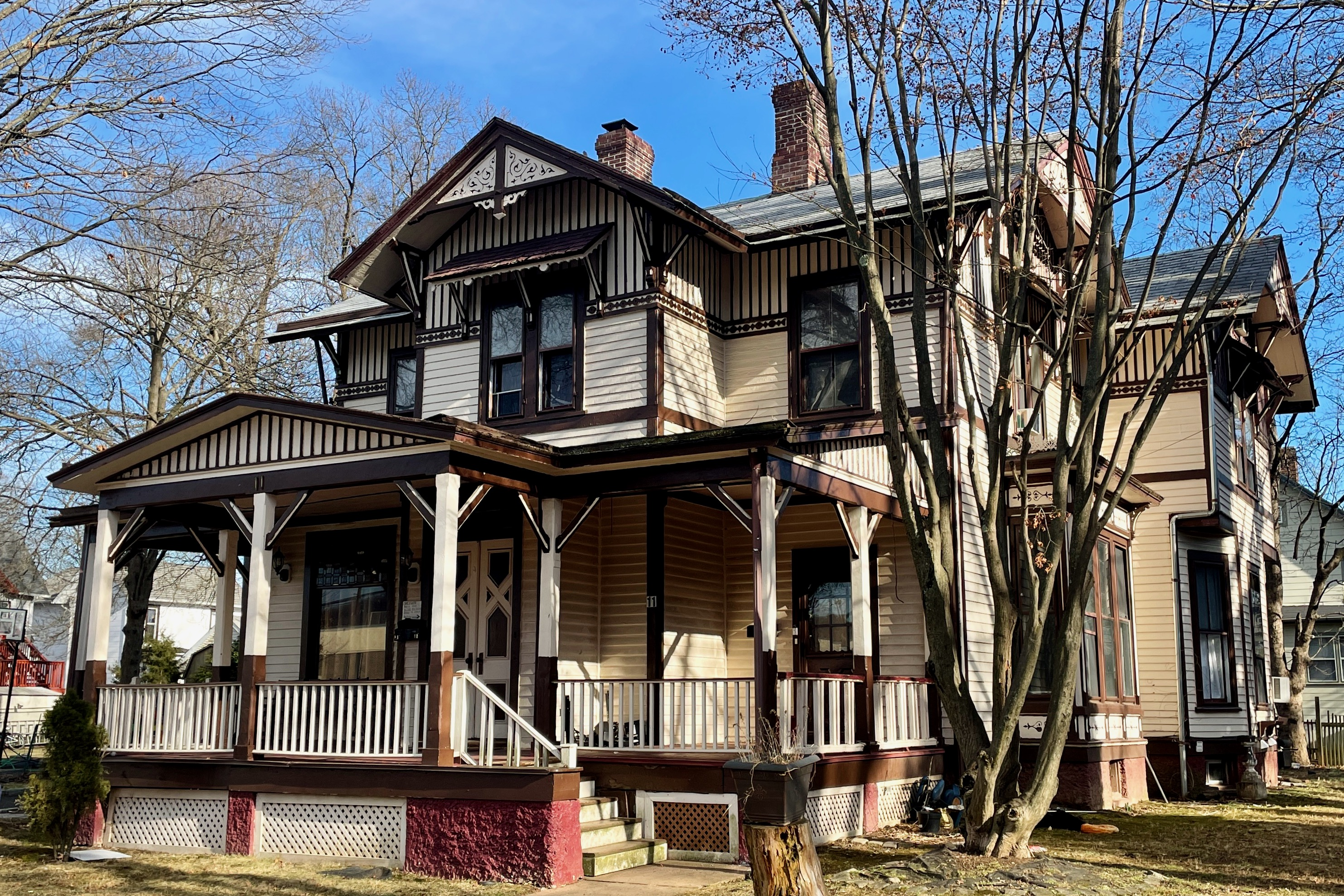
11 Rockview Avenue

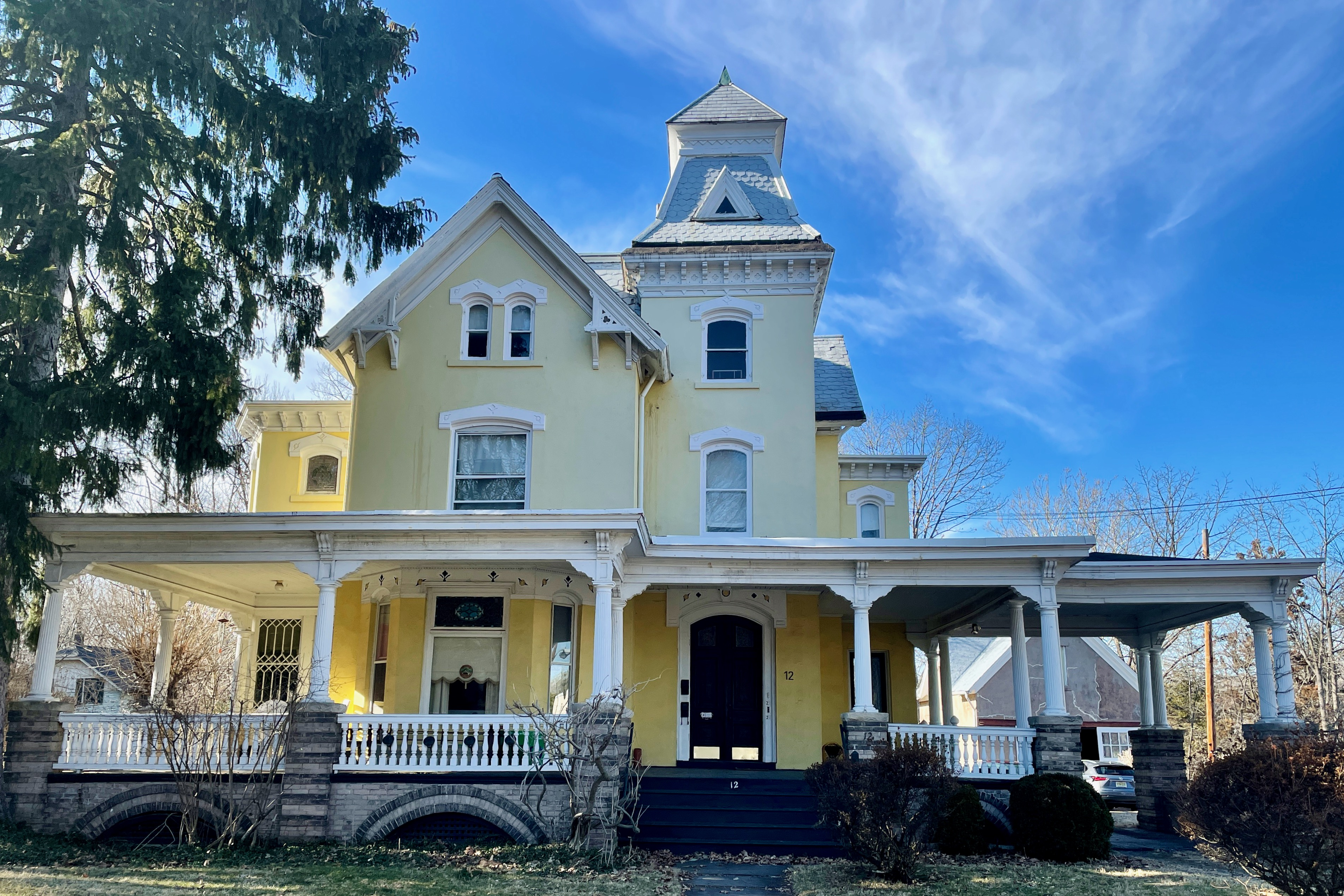
12 Rockview Avenue

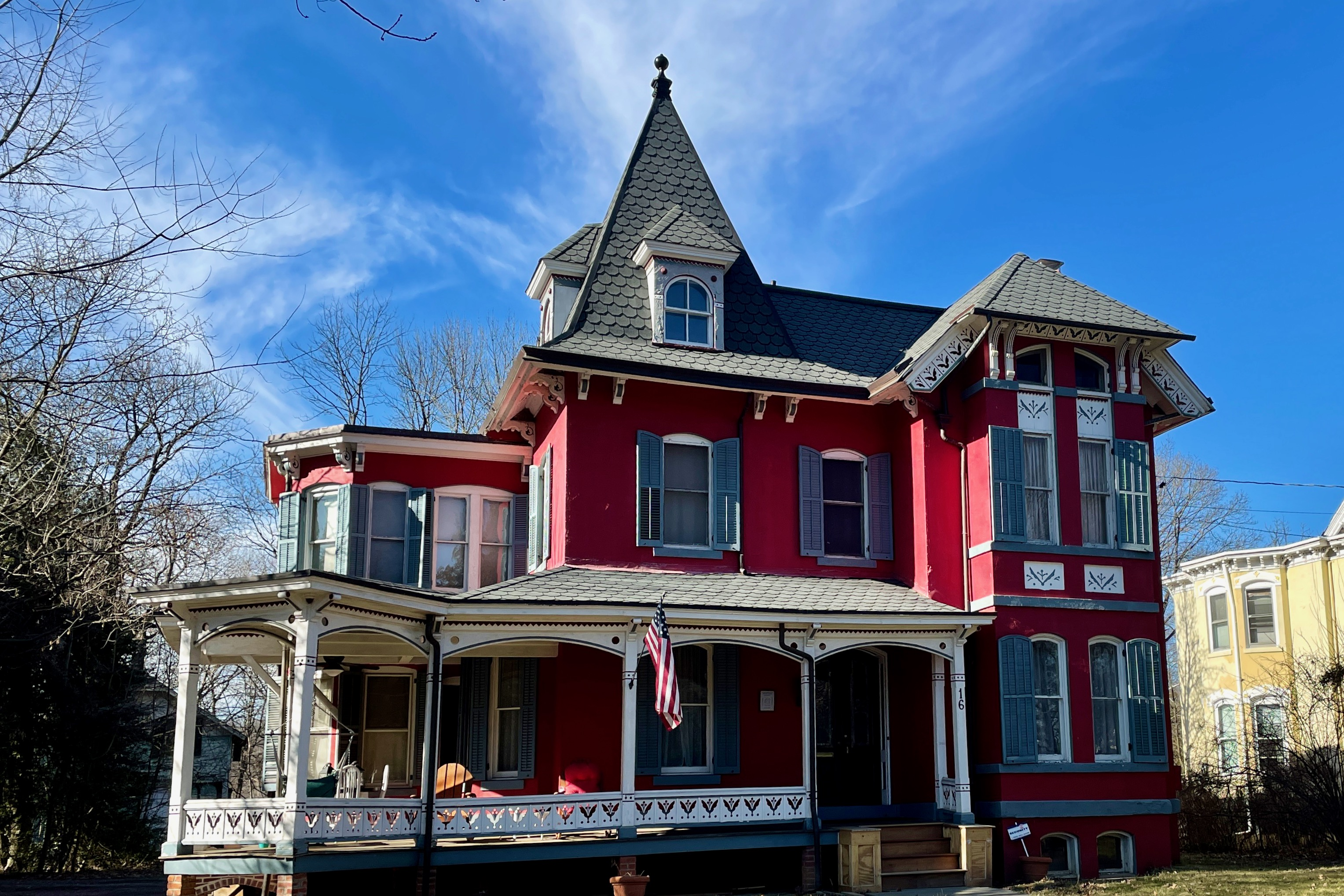
16 Rockview Avenue

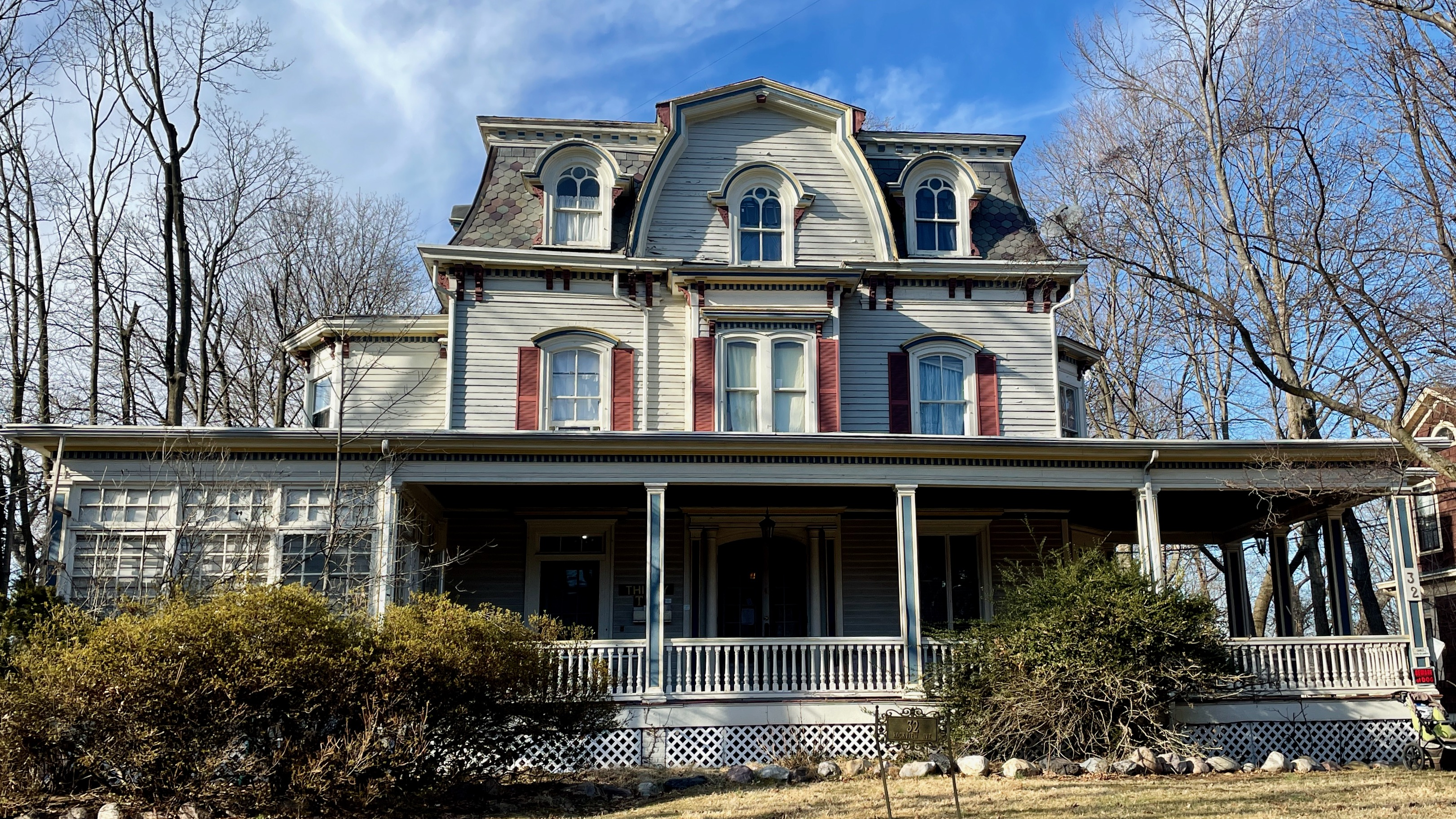
32 Rockview Avenue

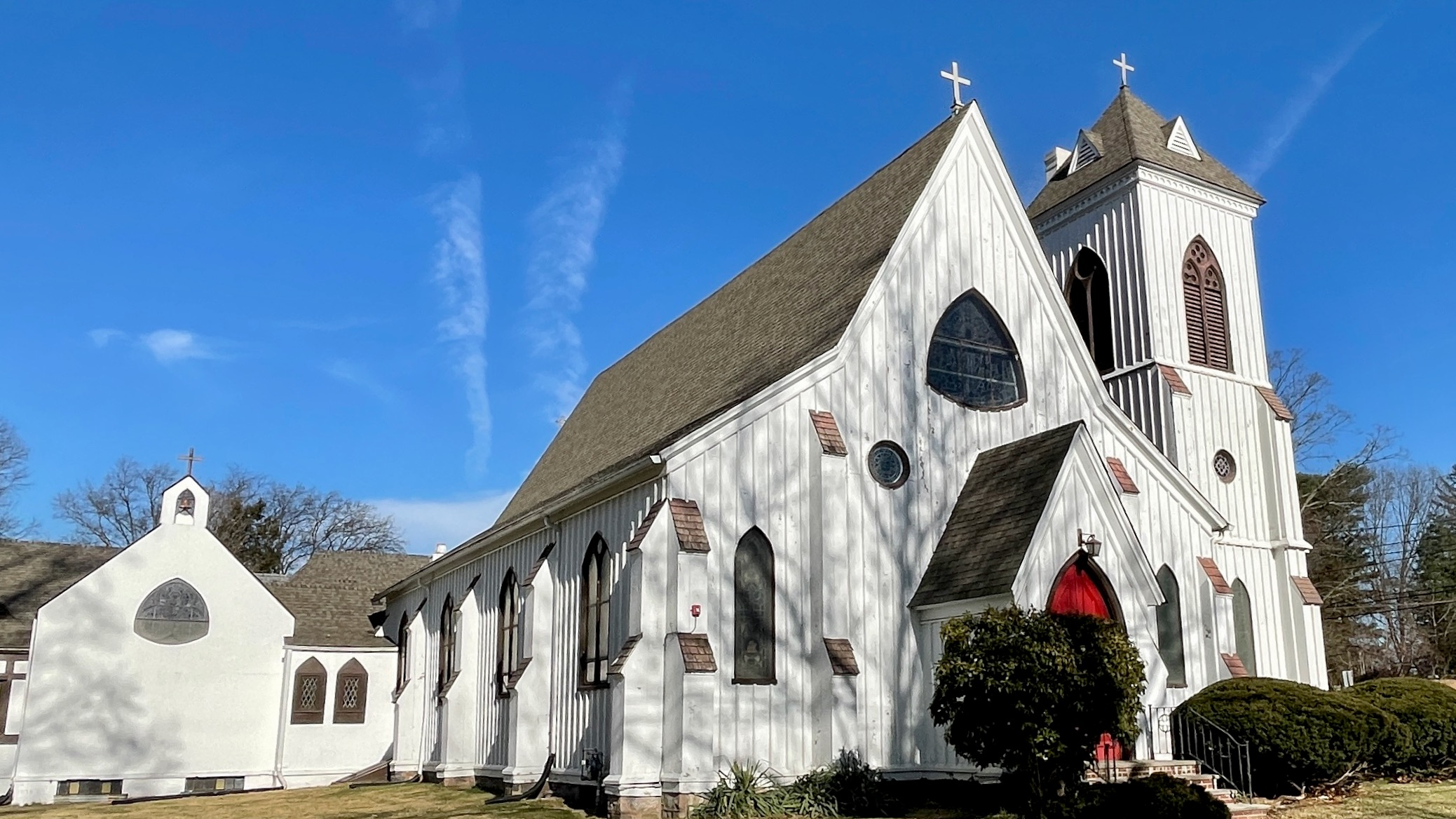
Church of the Holy Cross

== See also ==
- National Register of Historic Places listings in Somerset County, New Jersey
