= North Plainfield School District =

School district in Somerset County, New Jersey, US

Address
- 33 Mountain Avenue North Plainfield, New Jersey, 07060; United States
- Coordinates: 40.626241°N 74.43251°W

District information
- Grades: PreK–12
- Superintendent: Michelle Aquino
- Business administrator: Donald Sternberg
- Schools: 6

Students and staff
- Enrollment: 3,342 (as of 2018–19)
- Faculty: 304.0 FTEs
- Student–teacher ratio: 11.0:1

Other information
- District Factor Group: DE
- Website: District website
Ind.	Per pupil	District spending	Rank (*)	K–12 average	%± vs. average
1A	Total Spending	$18,811	49	$18,891	−0.4%
1	Budgetary Cost	14,692	48	14,783	−0.6%
2	Classroom Instruction	8,683	51	8,763	−0.9%
6	Support Services	2,286	46	2,392	−4.4%
8	Administrative Cost	1,433	21	1,485	−3.5%
10	Operations & Maintenance	1,952	58	1,783	9.5%
13	Extracurricular Activities	310	13	268	15.7%
16	Median Teacher Salary	62,135	29	64,043
Data from NJDoE 2014 Taxpayers' Guide to Education Spending. *Of K–12 districts with 1,800–3,500 students. Lowest spending=1; Highest=68

The North Plainfield School District is a comprehensive community public school district that serves students in pre-kindergarten through twelfth grade from North Plainfield in Somerset County, in the U.S. state of New Jersey. The district also houses a comprehensive Adult High School and an Adult Community School which offers educational programs for North Plainfield and neighboring community residents.

As of the 2018–19 school year, the district, comprised of six schools, had an enrollment of 3,342 students and 304.0 classroom teachers (on an FTE basis), for a student–teacher ratio of 11.0:1.

The district is classified by the New Jersey Department of Education as being in District Factor Group "DE", the fifth-highest of eight groupings. District Factor Groups organize districts statewide to allow comparison by common socioeconomic characteristics of the local districts. From lowest socioeconomic status to highest, the categories are A, B, CD, DE, FG, GH, I and J.

== Schools ==
Schools in the district (with 2018–19 enrollment data from the National Center for Education Statistics) are:

Elementary schools

- East End Elementary School (423 students; in grades PreK–4)
- Stony Brook Elementary School (253; PreK–4)
- West End Elementary School (488; K–4)

Middle school

- Somerset Intermediate School (516; 5–6)

Middle / High school

- North Plainfield Middle School (544; 7–8)
- North Plainfield High School (1,052; 9–12) is certified by the New Jersey Department of Education and accredited by the Middle States Association of Colleges and Schools, offers a comprehensive program of studies to its 7–12 enrollment.

== Administration ==
Core members of the district's administration are:

- Michelle Aquino, superintendent
- Donald Sternberg, business administrator and board secretary

== Board of education ==
The district's board of education, comprised of seven members, sets policy and oversees the fiscal and educational operation of the district through its administration. As a Type II school district, the board's trustees are elected directly by voters to serve three-year terms of office on a staggered basis, with either two or three seats up for election each year held (since 2012) as part of the November general election. The board appoints a superintendent to oversee the district's day-to-day operations and a business administrator to supervise the business functions of the district.
