= North Plainfield High School =

High school in Somerset County, New Jersey, US

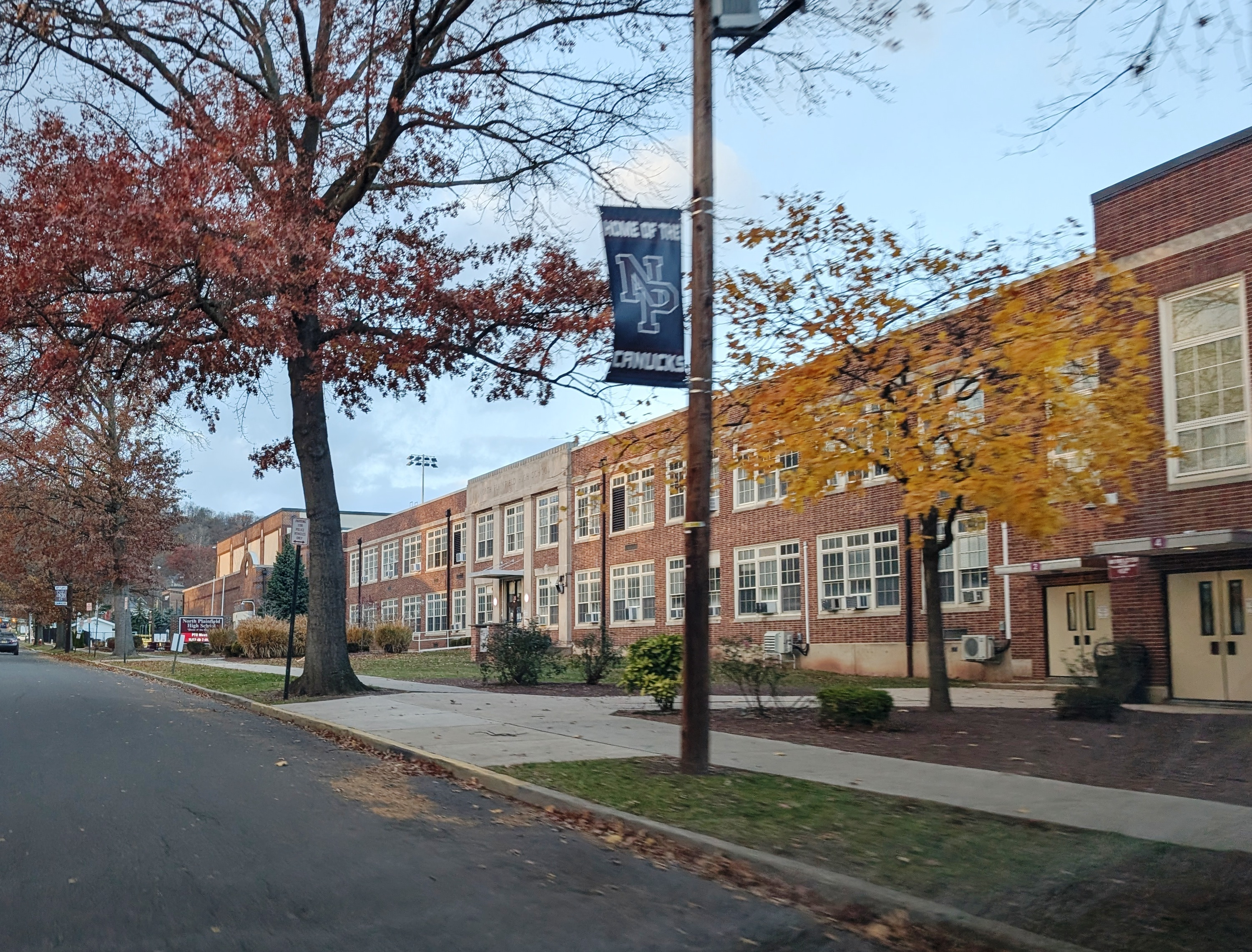

Location
- 34 Wilson Avenue; North Plainfield, (Somerset County), New Jersey 07060; United States; 40.622797°N 74.440423°W

Information
- Type: Public high school
- School district: North Plainfield School District
- NCES School ID: 341164005258
- Principal: Joseph Krouse
- Faculty: 100.0 FTEs
- Grades: 9-12
- Enrollment: 1,141 (as of 2024–25)
- Student to teacher ratio: 11.4:1
- Colors: Maroon; Black; White
- Athletics conference: Skyland Conference (general); Big Central Football Conference (football)
- Accreditation: Middle States Association of Colleges and Schools
- Newspaper: Tunlaw
- Website: nphs.nplainfield.org
- Last updated: May 17, 2021; 5 years ago

North Plainfield High School is a four-year comprehensive public high school serving students in ninth through twelfth grade from North Plainfield, in Somerset County, in the U.S. state of New Jersey, operating as part of the North Plainfield School District. The school is fully certified by the New Jersey Department of Education and has been accredited by the Middle States Association of Colleges and Schools Commission on Elementary and Secondary Schools since 1929, with the school's accreditation extended for seven years in Spring 2012.

As of the 2024–25 school year, the school had an enrollment of 1,141 students and 100.0 classroom teachers (on an FTE basis), for a student–teacher ratio of 11.4:1. There were 752 students (65.9% of enrollment) eligible for free lunch and 112 (9.8% of students) eligible for reduced-cost lunch.

== Awards, recognition and rankings ==
The school was the 266th-ranked public high school in New Jersey out of 339 schools statewide in New Jersey Monthly magazine's September 2014 cover story on the state's "Top Public High Schools", using a new ranking methodology. The school had been ranked 207th in the state of 328 schools in 2012, after being ranked 256th in 2010 out of 322 schools listed. The magazine ranked the school 226th in 2008 out of 316 schools. The school was ranked 189th in the magazine's September 2006 issue, which surveyed 316 schools across the state.

== Academic programs ==
North Plainfield High School offers a comprehensive program of studies. 81% of the class of 2005 entered college or other post-secondary education, 13% sought employment, and 6% pursued other options. The array of classes at Advanced Placement (AP), high ability, college preparatory, and general levels includes opportunities for independent study, a shared-time vocational program with Somerset County Vocational and Technical High School, courses in conjunction with Satellite Education Resource Consortium, and courses offered through a Tech-Prep partnership developed with Raritan Valley Community College. Courses in AP Calculus and AP Physics, Probability and Statistics, and Latin have also been offered either through other school districts in the Interactive Television (ITV) classroom or through the Florida Virtual Academy, an internet-based resource. A state-of-the-art Computer Assisted Drafting Lab, networked computer lab, and a comprehensive physical education facility opened in 1990-1991.

== Athletics ==
The North Plainfield High School Canucks have competed since 2005 in the Raritan Division of the Skyland Conference, which is comprised of public and private high schools in Hunterdon, Somerset and Warren counties, and operates under the supervision of the New Jersey State Interscholastic Athletic Association (NJSIAA). Prior to the NJSIAA's 2009 reorganization, the school had competed in the Mountain Valley Conference, which included high schools in Essex and Union counties. With 733 students in grades 10-12, the school was classified by the NJSIAA for the 2019–20 school year as Group II for most athletic competition purposes, which included schools with an enrollment of 486 to 758 students in that grade range. The football team competes in Division 2A of the Big Central Football Conference, which includes 60 public and private high schools in Hunterdon, Middlesex, Somerset, Union and Warren counties, which are broken down into 10 divisions by size and location. The school was classified by the NJSIAA as Group III North for football for 2024–2026, which included schools with 700 to 884 students.

The Canuck nickname comes from the borough being called "Little Canada" for its location north of Plainfield and across the Green Brook, just as Canada lies north of the United States across the St. Lawrence River.

The boys' track team won the Group III spring / outdoor track state championship in 1964 (as co-champion).

The football team won the 2008 Skyland Conference Raritan Division championship. In 2011 North Plainfield's Canucks went undefeated during the regular season achieving the record of 9-0. They won the Skyland Conference and entered the conference playoffs as the number 1 seed and secured home field advantage for the remainder of the playoffs. The North Plainfield Canucks played the #8 seed Carteret High School Ramblers, losing by a score of 27-21. The 2011 Canucks were the 3rd football team in Canuck history to ever achieve the record of 9-0 during the regular season.

The boys' soccer team won three Group II Conference Championships, in 1986, 1987 and 1988. The team finished those seasons ranked as one of the top teams in the state outscoring opponents (127 goals for 8 against).

The 1996 baseball team won the Central Jersey Group II state title with a 9-6 win over Ridge High School, earning the first title in school history.

The girls' spring track team was the Group II state champion in 1996.

In 2010, the boys' soccer team won the Central Jersey Group II title after defeating Delaware Valley Regional High School 2-1.

== Administration ==
The school's principal is Joseph Krouse.

== Notable alumni ==
- Paul Auerbach (1951–2021, class of 1969), physician and author about wilderness medicine
- Hank Beenders (1916-2003), early professional basketball player
- Jack Bicknell (born 1938, class of 1955), retired American football coach at the college level and in the various incarnations of NFL Europe
- Pete Carmichael (1941–2016), former football coach
- Anne Casale (1930-2002, class of 1948), cookbook author and cooking teacher
- John DiMaggio (born 1968, class of 1986), voice actor and former stand-up comedian
- Bill Evans (1929–1980, class of 1946), jazz musician
- Bill Feaster (1904–1950), professional football player who spent two seasons in the National Football League with the Orange/Newark Tornadoes
- Bernice Lapp (1917–2010), competition swimmer who represented the United States at the 1936 Summer Olympics in Berlin, winning a bronze medal in the women's 4x100-meter freestyle relay
- Harry Leahey (1935–1990, class of 1953), jazz guitarist and teacher
- John T. "Jack" Melick Jr. (1929–2021), band leader, pianist, and arranger
- Molly Price (born 1966), actress who has appeared on Third Watch
- Gerry Rosenthal (born 1980, class of 1998), actor, voice actor, singer-songwriter and musician
- Myke Scavone (born 1949, class of 1966), harmonica player and vocalist best known for his work with the bands The Doughboys, Ram Jam and The Yardbirds
- Steve Schmidt (born 1970, class of 1988), senior campaign strategist and advisor to the 2008 presidential campaign of Senator John McCain
- Nancy Van de Vate (1930–2023, class of 1948), composer, violist and pianist
