= Nancy Dow =

American actress (1936–2016)

- Publicity photo of Dow
- Born: Nancy Ellen Dow; July 22, 1936; New London, Connecticut, U.S.
- Died: May 25, 2016 (aged 79); Los Angeles, California, U.S.
- Other name: Nancy Aniston
- Occupation: Actress
- Years active: 1966–2004
- Spouses: Jack Melick (m. 1956; div. 1961) John Aniston (m. 1965; div. 1980)
- Children: 2, including Jennifer

Nancy Ellen Dow (July 22, 1936 – May 25, 2016) was an American television and film actress. She was married to actor John Aniston and was the mother of actress Jennifer Aniston.

== Early life ==
Dow was born on July 22, 1936, in New London, Connecticut, to Gordon McLean Dow and Louise (née Grieco), who were living on Fishers Island, New York. (Note: Some obituaries gave her birthplace as New York or New York City.) She was one of six daughters. Her maternal grandfather, Louis Grieco, was an Italian immigrant; her other ancestry included English, Scottish and Irish. She attended North Hollywood High School.

== Career ==
Dow's career included modeling, television appearances in the 1960s, and later film work. In 1966, she played Athena in an episode of The Beverly Hillbillies. In 1967, she appeared in episodes of The Wild Wild West and Mr. Terrific. She also appeared in the 1969 film The Ice House. Her final acting credit was in the 2004 Canadian film Pure.

Dow was also the author of From Mother and Daughter to Friends: A Memoir, a 1999 book about her relationship with her daughter, Jennifer Aniston.

== Personal life ==
Dow was married to John T. "Jack" Melick Jr., a pianist and bandleader, from 1956 to 1961. They married on August 25, 1956, at the Toluca Lake Community Church in North Hollywood. The couple had one son, John T. Melick III, who became an assistant director and second-unit director.

In 1965, Dow married John Aniston. They had one daughter, Jennifer (b. 1969). The marriage ended in 1980.

Dow and her daughter became estranged after Dow talked about her on a television talk show. Dow's 1999 book about their relationship, From Mother and Daughter to Friends: A Memoir, was published while they were still estranged. In 2005, after Aniston's divorce from Brad Pitt, she and her mother reportedly reconciled. Aniston described the gradual progress of her new relationship with her mother: "It's been really nice. It's crazy what, you know, your life kind of being turned upside down will lead you to. ... For us it's ... It was the time, and it was going to happen when it was supposed to happen. So, this is good. It's baby steps."

== Health and death ==
Dow had a stroke in 2011 and a second stroke a year later. She died in Los Angeles on May 25, 2016, at the age of 79, after what her children described as a long illness.

== Filmography ==
- The Beverly Hillbillies (1966) (TV series) – Athena
- The Wild Wild West (1967) (TV series) – Tersa
- The Ice House (1969) – Jan Wilson
- Pure (2004) – Lynne
