= John Aniston =

Greek-American actor (1933–2022)

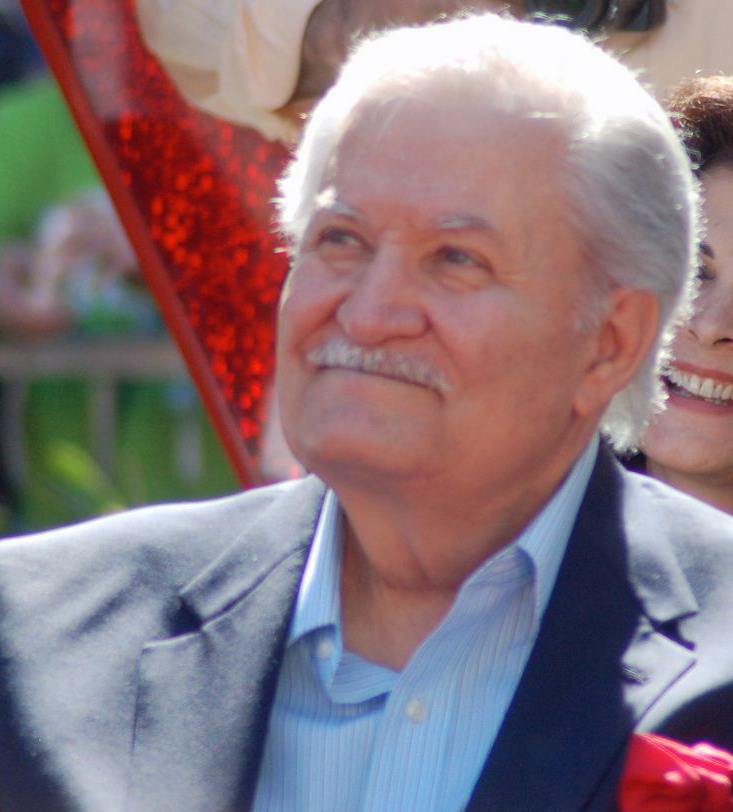
- Aniston in 2012
- Born: Ioannis Anastassakis; July 24, 1933; Pervolakia, Greece
- Died: November 11, 2022 (aged 89); Los Angeles, California, U.S.
- Resting place: Forest Lawn Memorial Park, Hollywood Hills, California, U.S.
- Citizenship: Greece; United States
- Education: Pennsylvania State University
- Occupation: Actor
- Years active: 1959–2022
- Spouses: Nancy Dow (m. 1965; div. 1980) Sherry Rooney (m. 1984)
- Children: 2, including Jennifer

John Anthony Aniston (born Ioannis Anastassakis, Greek: Ιωάννης Αναστασάκης, July 24, 1933 – November 11, 2022) was a Greek-American actor who played Victor Kiriakis on the NBC daytime drama series Days of Our Lives, which he originated in July 1985 and played on and off for 37 years, until his death in 2022. His portrayal earned him a Daytime Emmy Award nomination for Outstanding Supporting Actor in a Drama Series in 2017 and he received a Daytime Emmy Lifetime Achievement Award in 2022. He was the father of actress Jennifer Aniston.

== Early life ==
Aniston was born in Pervolakia, Chania on the island of Crete, Greece, on July 24, 1933, to Stella Joanne (née Koume; 1899–1992) and Antonios Anastassakis (1889–1965). The family left Crete for the United States when Aniston was two years old; his father anglicized the family's names on arriving in the US. The family settled in Chester, Pennsylvania, where they operated a restaurant.

Aniston attended Eddystone High School and later graduated from Pennsylvania State University with a bachelor's degree in theater arts. While at Penn State, he became a member of Alpha Chi Rho fraternity. After college, he served in the United States Navy as an intelligence officer on active duty in Panama and later in the Reserve, attaining the rank of lieutenant commander.

== Career ==
Aniston appeared in the original cast of "Little Mary Sunshine" in 1959, off-Broadway. Aniston appeared in 1962 in 87th Precinct as "Officer #1" in the episode "New Man in the Precinct". He appeared in soap operas regularly starting in 1970, when he first joined Days of Our Lives as a character named Dr. Eric Richards. In 1975, he joined the cast of Love of Life as Eddie Aleata, appearing through 1978. He played Mary Stuart's new love interest, Martin Tourneur, on Search for Tomorrow from 1980 until April 1984. He returned to the cast of Days of Our Lives a second time, this time as Victor Kiriakis, in July 1985, and continued to play the role until his death. He was nominated for the 2017 Daytime Emmy Award for Outstanding Supporting Actor in a Drama Series for his performance.

In April 2022, it was announced that Aniston would receive a Daytime Emmy Lifetime Achievement Award at the 49th Annual Daytime Creative Arts & Lifestyle Emmy Awards on June 18.

Aniston also played small roles on the television series Airwolf in the season two episode "Short Walk to Freedom", Gilmore Girls as Douglas Swope in the 2002 episode "A Deep Fried Korean Thanksgiving", The West Wing as Alexander Thompson in the episodes "Game On" and "Debate Camp" (both in 2002), as the First IMF Captain in the 1969 Mission Impossible episode "Time Bomb". Aniston has also made guest appearances on Combat! (1964), My Big Fat Greek Life (2002), Star Trek: Voyager (2001), American Dreams (with Days co-star Frances Reid), Journeyman, and Mad Men.

== Personal life ==
Aniston had a daughter, Jennifer Aniston (born 1969), with his first wife, Nancy Dow, and a son (born 1989) with his second wife, Sherry Rooney (whom he met while co-starring on Love of Life). He was good friends with Telly Savalas, who was Jennifer's godfather.

=== Death ===
Aniston died on November 11, 2022, aged 89. He was buried at Forest Lawn Memorial Park, Hollywood Hills, California, U.S.

== Filmography ==
Year	Title	Role	Notes	Ref.
1962	87th Precinct	Officer #1	Episode: "New Man in the Precinct"	
1963	Love with the Proper Stranger	Birdman of Macy's		
1964	Combat!	Greek #2	Episode: "Vendetta"	
1967	I Spy	Economides	Episode: "The Beautiful Children"	
1968	The Shakiest Gun in the West	Indian		
1968	The Virginian	Frank West	Episode: "Ride to Misadventure"	
1968	Now You See It, Now You Don't	Achmed	TV film	
1969	Mission: Impossible	First IMF Captain	Episode: "Time Bomb"	
1970; 1985–2022	Days of Our Lives	Eric Richards; Victor Kiriakis	3,782 episodes	
1970	That Girl	Phil Harvey	Episode: "Stop the Presses I Want to Get Off"	
1974	Kojak	Webster / Dancik	2 episodes	
1975–1978	Love of Life	Eddie Aleata	Unknown episodes	
1979–1984	Search for Tomorrow	Martin Tourneur	Episode: "#1.8556"	
1985	Airwolf	Colonel Arturo Alzar	Episode: "Short Walk to Freedom"	
1986	Inhumanoids	Dr. Marcus Capello/Captain Action	27 Episodes	
1993	Night Sins	Victor Kiriakis	TV film	
1997	Diagnosis: Murder	Carlton Everest	Episode: "Must Kill TV"	
1997	Fired Up	Gordon	Episode: "Honey, I Shrunk the Turkey"	
1999	L.A. Heat	Alex Zota	Episode: "Faces of Fear"	
2001	Star Trek: Voyager	Quarren Ambassador	"Workforce", Parts I and II	
2002	The West Wing	Alexander Thompson	2 episodes	
2002	Gilmore Girls	Douglas Swope	Episode: "A Deep-Fried Korean Thanksgiving"	
2003	My Big Fat Greek Life	Constantine Christakos	Episode: "Greek Easter"	
2004	American Dreams	John Victor	Episode: "Old Enough to Fight"	
2007	Order Up	Wise Man	Short film	
2007	Sands of Oblivion	Nigel Barrington	TV film	
2007	Journeyman	Merrit Ambaucher	Episode: "Home by Another Way"	
2008	The Awakening of Spring	Mr. Gable		
2008	Worst Week	Jim	Episode: "The Wedding"	
2008	Fixing Rhonda	Detective Macomas		
2009	The Gold & the Beautiful	Gerard Benedict		
2009	Cold Case	Herbert "Wolf" James	Episode: "WASP"	
2010	Mad Men	Wallace Harriman	Episode: "Waldorf Stories"	
2011	The Paul Reiser Show	Harold Melon	Episode: "The Old Guy"	
2014	Return to Zero	Ned		

== Awards and nominations ==
List of acting awards and nominations
Year	Award	Category	Title	Result	Ref.
1986	Soap Opera Digest Awards	Outstanding Actor in a Leading Role on a Daytime Serial	Days of Our Lives	Won	
1986	Soap Opera Digest Awards	Outstanding Villain on a Daytime Serial	Days of Our Lives	Won	
2017	Daytime Emmy Awards	Outstanding Supporting Actor in a Drama Series	Days of Our Lives	Nominated	
2022	Daytime Emmy Awards	Daytime Emmy Lifetime Achievement Award	Days of Our Lives	Won	
