= Jack Melick =

American bandleader (1929–2021)

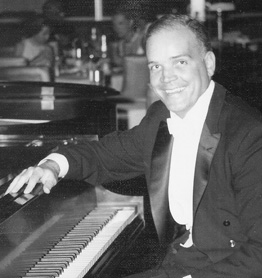
- Melick in 1966

Background information
- Born: December 21, 1929; North Plainfield, New Jersey, U.S.
- Died: June 25, 2021 (aged 91)
- Genres: Jazz; big band; swing
- Occupations: Musician, bandleader, arranger
- Instruments: Piano; clarinet
- Years active: 1943–2021
- Labels: Chaparral; Carlton
- Spouse: Nancy Dow (m. 1956; div. 1961)

John T. Melick Jr. (December 21, 1929 – June 25, 2021) was an American bandleader, pianist, and arranger.

== Early life ==
Melick was born and raised in North Plainfield, New Jersey, where he attended North Plainfield High School. Like many American kids of his era, piano lessons were an early part of his education. His mother was a school teacher and his father was an insurance salesman; both recognized his early interest and talent as a musician and encouraged his pursuit of a musical life. He proclaimed his intention to become a band leader at the age of 7. Raised on the Great American Songbook of the 1930s and 1940s, he became immersed in the jazz and big band cultures of his youth.

Among others, his early musical influences included famous jazz musicians like Louis Armstrong, Charlie Parker, Dizzy Gillespie, and Stan Kenton. His career would be most influenced by popular band leaders like Freddy Martin, Harry James, and Orrin Tucker.

Melick formed his first band at the age of 13 and had his first paying gig at the age of 14, playing the piano for students at a local dance studio. At the age of 16, fate offered him (and other musicians his age) a unique opportunity to perform publicly as the older and more experienced musicians were in Europe or Asia fighting in World War II. He began playing local dance gigs culminating in a summer 1946 engagement at Camp Sagamore (an adult resort) in the Pocono Mountains of Pennsylvania. It was an engagement him and his young band would play for the following two summers.

Another primary influence in the direction of his career was a contemporary musician. William John "Bill" Evans was his classmate at North Plainfield High School and a friendly "competitor" for local music jobs during their high school years. A future jazz star and Grammy winner, Evans was usually the first choice to play the piano at local proms and social events. Rather than remain constantly in Evans' shadow as a pianist, Melick decided the best route to success on the local scene was to be the "leader of the band" and concentrate on commercial dance music.

== College and the Korean War ==
=== Oberlin College ===
Melick entered the Oberlin Conservatory of Music at Oberlin College (Ohio) in the Fall of 1947. He originally intended to enroll in the Conservatory as a piano major. To which he quickly came to the realization that the hours of practice and focus on piano didn't fit his ultimate desire to be a dance band leader. He then switched his major to public school music education. Music education not only better suited his career path, it was also something he could pursue in the event he didn't make it in the dance band business.

In fact, he thrived in his high school band. One of his early heroes was his high school band director – Joe Schaedel. Melick's musicianship and leadership skills served him well when he was named the band's director – as a high school senior – as Schaedel suffered from a short-term illness. Schaedel recovered, but Melick led his classmates in the marching band all through the football season of 1946 and beyond. Schaedel had taught him how to play the clarinet so he could be in the marching band. He continued on the clarinet through college and played in the Oberlin marching band as well.

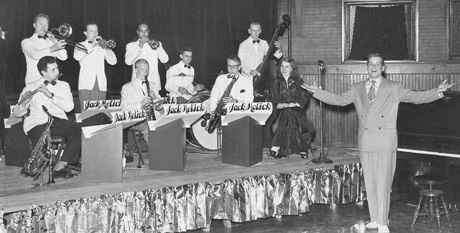
Melick's College Big Band as He Strikes His Stan Kenton Pose

He began working almost immediately to form his own band at Oberlin. By his second year, he and his dance band played almost every weekend throughout northwestern Ohio; parties at small colleges like Kenyon, Antioch, Wittenberg, Hiram, and Wooster. In addition, he returned to Camp Sagamore in the summer of 1948 with his high school band. In the summer of 1949, he would begin a three-summer solo engagement at a local hangout called The Club in Point Pleasant Beach, New Jersey.

=== Military service ===
He graduated from Oberlin in June 1951 and headed straight home to his piano gig in Point Pleasant but with an inkling about what might happen next. Most of his non-college friends had already been drafted for the Korean War. In early August, the letter arrived, and he reported for processing at Camp Kilmer in Edison, New Jersey. Shortly after that, he was on his way to basic training at Camp Chaffee, Arkansas. A classmate and trombonist from Oberlin, Dick Strang, had arrived at Camp Chaffee a month before. When basic training finished for Strang, he went immediately into the Army Band at Camp Chaffee. Melick figured the Army Band was his destiny in the service as well. But then, for some reasons not explained to the draftees, all specialties were canceled, and everyone was put into the pipeline to fight in Korea. The staging point was Camp Drake outside Tokyo and Melick was on his way there in January 1952.

While awaiting his assignment, he found the camp's Service Club. The Service Clubs all had pianos, and he took the opportunity to play whenever he could. Soon after his arrival at Camp Drake, another soldier heard Melick's rendition of "Ain't Misbehavin'". Admiring Melick's play, the soldier – just a private himself – thought something could be done to get Melick out of the pipeline and into Special Services. The soldier turned out to be a young Hollywood actor named Richard Long. Melick didn't know him, and in his own mind, didn't give Long's suggestion a lot of thought. However, the next day, Melick began to receive calls from various Army musical commands in Japan regarding his background. Two days later, he was on his way to Yokohama. Melick didn't see Richard Long again until Melick's arrival in Hollywood in the late 1950s, but he began to tell the story that Richard Long saved his life by getting him an assignment in Yokohama instead of Korea.

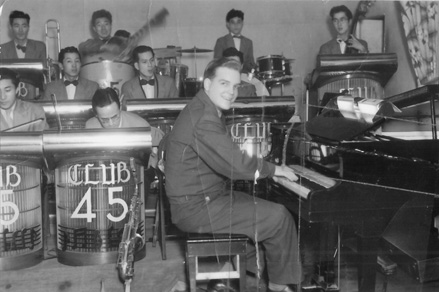
Pvt. Melick Entertains at the Yokohama R&R Center in 1953

For the next year, he was stationed at Special Services in Camp Yokohama. In addition to his own playing, he booked a series of talented Japanese entertainers to perform at the EM HUT – the enlisted men's club at the Yokohama R&R Center.

During this time, he met actor and comedian Jim MacGeorge. Melick, MacGeorge, and a handful of Japanese entertainers formed the Jack Melick Show, and they toured Japan on 10-day leaves. He also met Miyoshi "Nancy" Umeki, whom he dated in Japan for more than a year. She was a well-known singer in Japan, and would later go on to Hollywood stardom.

Melick's military draft period ended in August 1953, and he returned briefly to The Club in Point Pleasant Beach. However, he was so intrigued by his experience in Japan that he asked a Japanese agent, Tats Nagashima, to arrange a working visa so that he could return to Japan to resume entertaining. In November 1953, his solo piano act began playing with house musicians at Japanese clubs and U.S. military installations.

== Career ==
Melick spent another year entertaining in Japan, and in November 1954 decided it was time to begin his "real career" in the United States. So he returned home at the age of 24. He placed an ad in The Billboard magazine promoting himself as a pianist and within two days had telegrams and phone calls from numerous bands. He selected a band led by the only name he recognized – Leo Peeper – and joined Peeper's "territory band" in Muscatine, Iowa in late 1954. Soon, the band's publicity began touting "Leo Peeper and His Orchestra, featuring Jack Melick."

The "territories" comprised numerous dance ballrooms throughout the United States, most notably in the Midwest and Southwest from Minnesota to Texas. Most towns, even the small ones, had a dance ballroom or hall, such as an Elks Club or Moose Lodge. Dozens of territory bands played one-nighters at these halls from the 1920s through the 1960s.

Melick had been with Leo Peeper for just 4 months when he got a call from Jimmy "Dancing Shoes" Palmer – a Chicago band leader. He offered Melick a job at considerably higher pay, but what intrigued Melick the most was an ambitious schedule that culminated in a two-week engagement at the world-famous Hollywood Palladium. He accepted the position and joined Palmer's band in early 1955. By the time they reached Los Angeles, he was Palmer's featured pianist and had two solos during each performance.

== The Hollywood years ==
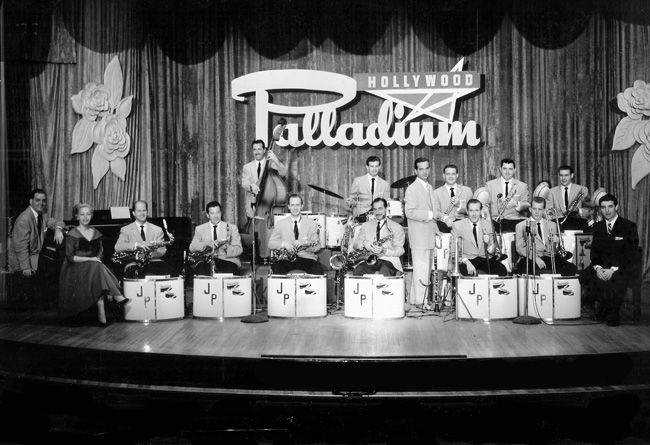
The Jimmy Palmer Orchestra on "Palladium Dance Time." Melick is at the piano far left.

=== On KTLA ===
The Hollywood Palladium hosted a TV show – broadcast on KTLA – called Palladium Dance Time every Tuesday night. It was the practice of the Palladium to feature the current band on the television show. So Palmer's band arrived on a Monday night and was performing on television the very next night. Melick had a solo in each half-hour of the show. His performances that first Tuesday caught the attention of the show's director. The next morning he was invited to the KTLA studios to meet with television pioneer and station manager, Klaus Landsberg, about a new Friday night show to replace Lawrence Welk, who had departed KTLA for the ABC television network.

Melick, along with a handful of other featured players, was hand-selected by Landsberg to join the renowned band leader Orrin Tucker on a new dance music program; The Orrin Tucker Show. Melick was briefly the center of controversy as Jimmy Palmer publicly accused Landsberg of stealing his piano player. It didn't last long and everyone involved got a bit of free publicity. Melick remained the featured pianist on The Orrin Tucker Show until it was cancelled in October 1956 shortly after the death of Landsberg.

Melick settled in Hollywood during these years and Los Angeles remained his home base until 1966.

While playing for Orrin Tucker on television one night a week, Melick also began playing across the street from Universal Studios at a local piano bar called The Keys. The studio system was still in force in Hollywood from 1955–1956, and The Keys was a favorite local hangout for such young stars as Clint Eastwood, William Reynolds, and David Janssen, in addition to the many crew members and stuntmen. He also renewed his friendship with two fellow soldiers from the Korean War; Jim MacGeorge and Richard Long. MacGeorge had embarked on a very successful career as a voice actor and comedian. Long had resumed his busy career in film and television (but never accepted the idea that he had saved Melick's life).

=== MCA Calls ===
Melick remained briefly at KTLA once The Orrin Tucker Show went off the air, and played as a guest performer on the station's remaining music shows like Bandstand Revue. During these remaining months at KTLA, he was approached by the booking division of MCA, Inc., one of the largest talent agencies at the time. Lured by MCA's belief they could make him the next big band star, Melick signed. They would be his first and only agents. The desired level of name recognition never quite materialized, but MCA would keep him busy in quality roles as a band leader or piano soloist for the next several years.

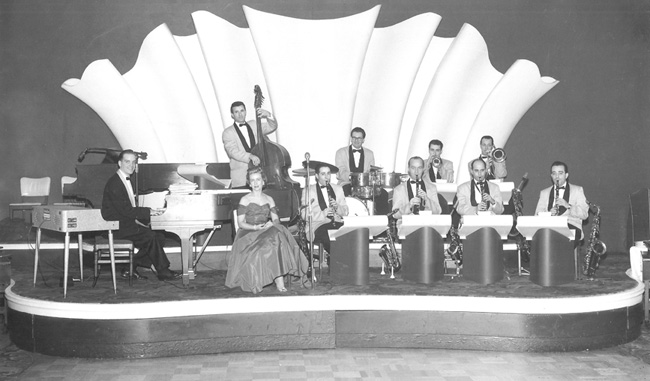
The Jack Melick Orchestra – Melick's first Big Band at the Hotel Statler in Boston

He began touring immediately and his first assignment was to organize a band from southern California for a 3-month engagement in Boston in the dead of winter. It was the beginning of real life in the band business. He called Los Angeles his home but didn't spend much time there. Early bookings included recurring engagements in Los Angeles, Hollywood, Albuquerque, Phoenix, the High Desert of California, and Reno.

An early fan was Charles Mapes, proprietor of the Mapes Hotel in Reno. MCA had booked Melick in the hotel's casino lounge, as a trio, beginning in 1957. At Mapes' request, Melick returned regularly for a couple of years, and his fortunes changed for the better in late 1959. The Sky Room – the hotel's main showroom – had been closed for that summer, and the showroom's house band, Eddie Fitzpatrick and His Orchestra moved across the street to the Riverside Hotel. Mapes was planning a grand re-opening to coincide with the 1960 Winter Olympics in Squaw Valley and was looking for a new band leader. MCA highly recommended Melick be promoted from the lounge to the Sky Room. Mapes contacted Eddie Fitzpatrick and he agreed with MCA. Melick became the house band leader at the famous Sky Room until it closed for good in the summer of 1960. His band played for the likes of Ken Murray, Jan Murray, Mickey Rooney, Lili St. Cyr, Sammy Davis Jr., Myron Cohen, Betty Grable, George Gobel, Dennis Morgan, Billy Eckstine, Jack Carson, and Milton Berle, among others.

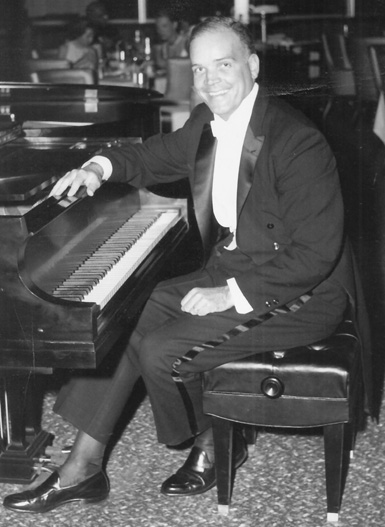
White Tie and Tails at the Sultan's Table in 1966

Once the Sky Room closed, MCA brought him back to California where he resumed some of his prior regular engagements including the Casino Room at the Ambassador Hotel in Los Angeles and comedian Jerry Lewis's restaurant in Hollywood. In addition, he began a solo gig at the Dunes Hotel in Las Vegas which would become part of his regular schedule every summer during the years he was based in Los Angeles. The Dunes had an exclusive restaurant called The Sultan's Table. White tie and tails was his "uniform" and a 9-foot grand piano was his instrument. The Sultan's Table was a favorite among the celebrities working in Las Vegas at the time. Comedian Louie Nye and the legendary Frank Sinatra were among Melick's fans. Liberace, the headliner at the neighboring Riviera Hotel, was a regular at the restaurant when Melick played. Melick also developed a relationship with Bobby Sherwood, a well-known band leader and performer, who often played at The Dunes when Melick did.

=== "Jack, this is Guy" ===
In August 1960, in between MCA engagements, he got an early-morning phone call from Guy Lombardo. Lombardo had temporarily lost Fred Kreitzer – one of his twin piano players – to injury. As the leader of an east coast band, Lombardo was unfamiliar with the artists that toured the western venues, so he contacted his friend and well-known band leader, Freddy Martin. Martin and Melick had worked together at the Ambassador Hotel in Los Angeles where Martin was the band leader at the famous Cocoanut Grove while Melick headlined the Casino Room. Martin recommended Melick. Melick located his red coat and joined Lombardo's band in Lake Tahoe as one of their twin piano players. He toured as a member of the Royal Canadians until his next MCA commitment in December of that year – the Chaparral Club in Dallas.

=== On the Road Again ===
What he didn't know at the time was that the Chaparral Club would become a regular engagement every year for the next 34 years. The Southwest in general, and Dallas in particular, remained a viable market for big band dance music long after the Great American Songbook faded away in most areas of the country. The Chaparral Club became his "home away from home" throughout the 1960s. For the next few years, Melick toured from Las Vegas to Dallas to Los Angeles.

In early 1964, Melick replaced his winter stops in LA with a return to his beloved Japan where he did what he did in his wartime days – touring with local musicians at clubs and military bases throughout Japan, and southeast Asia.

In 1967, he ended his regular visits to Las Vegas and the Far East and focused his efforts entirely in the southwest, adding the Warwick Hotel in Houston. At the urging of his many Dallas-based patrons, he focused primarily on the lucrative society band business based in Dallas with occasional one-nighters around Texas, Oklahoma and Louisiana. The long one-nighter tours were over. Melick had firmly established himself in the society band business, based in Dallas.

=== Dallas career ===
Throughout the 1950s and 1960s, the society band business in Dallas had been led by a relocated New York band leader named Joe Reichman. When Melick shifted his residence from Los Angeles and moved permanently to Dallas in December 1966, he had already been playing in Dallas for many years so he was well known in Dallas musical society. Reichman and another Dallas band leader Herman Waldman welcomed Melick to Dallas as a permanent resident. In fact, Reichman was instrumental in helping Melick acquire his local musician’s union card.

Throughout the 1960s Melick had become well-known and in-demand on the Dallas country club circuit. Therefore, it was Reichman’s opinion that Melick should be welcomed with open arms. Among Melick’s patrons in those years were the icons of modern Dallas – R.L. Thornton Jr., John M. Stemmons, John W. Carpenter, Felix McKnight, Joe Dealey, Dick Blair, Harwood K. Smith, and many others.

Melick also endeared himself to the Dallas Jewish community. He met several of the Jewish members of the Chaparral Club including Howard B. Wolfe, an entrepreneur in the garment industry. One of Wolfe's daughters was getting married and he asked Melick if he had ever played a Jewish wedding. As a "Jersey boy," he had indeed, as far back as high school. Wolfe asked him to do the job, and another market opened up for him. He went on to play for other Dallas business icons from the Jewish community such as Donald Zale and Lester Melnick.

One of Melick's band members, Marshall Head – who still plays with him today – acquired a book of clarinet solos from a well-known Jewish musician on the California social circuit named Mickey Katz. Soon he was accurately emulating Katz's playing style and the Jack Melick Orchestra became known as the "best Jewish band" in town.

Melick's principal rival in the society band business was a band leader and arranger named Mal Fitch. While Melick's home venue was the Chaparral Club, Fitch was the principal act at the Cipango Club. Both were waiting for the imminent retirement of Reichman. Intense rivals throughout the period, Melick and Fitch eventually became friends, and there was more than enough work to keep them both busy, even as Reichman continued to work in Dallas.

As societal trends changed more and more away from the pure big bands, Melick found an opportunity to co-exist with the new sounds of the 1960s and beyond at weddings, debutante parties, and other social events. It's one of the reasons he's still in business today. In Melick's own words, "When rock and roll started to become real popular, I would meet with the debutante or bride, her mother, and sometimes her grandmother – you know, the one who was paying for the whole thing. The bride or the debutante would always ask if we could mix in some rock and roll with our music. I'd say, 'Sorry, we don't do that, but those bands don't try to play "In the Mood" either!' So I proposed a new program. We'd play from 8:00 until 11:00 or so while grandma was there, and then we'd fold up and bring a local rock band in to go until 1:00 or so in the morning. That was not my original idea, but that's what started to happen. And we became very successful with it."

He was so successful with it, in fact, that many society parties took it to the next level. The Jack Melick Orchestra played one early 1970s event in Corpus Christi. His band was outside where the owners had built a temporary dance floor over the swimming pool. Meanwhile, inside the residence, the rock band set up. More or less on cue at 11:00pm, Melick's band hit their last note and inside the house, Chubby Checker and his band struck the first note of "The Twist", and the transition to rock and roll for the rest of the evening was complete.

== And the Beat Goes On ==
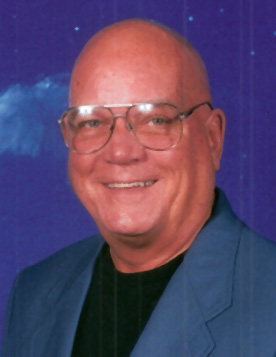
Melick in 2012

Jack Melick, a Founding Member of the Big Band Academy of America (BBAA) and an inductee of the North Plainfield High School Alumni Hall of Fame, is based in North Dallas. His 11-piece band, the Jack Melick Orchestra, has maintained a "semi-retired" schedule, performing 4 to 6 times a month at dance halls, hotel ballrooms, and clubs across the Southwest, including Dallas, Houston, Tyler, and beyond. Notably, in September 2012, the orchestra played at the Highland Springs Gala, a charity ball that marked a significant milestone—69 years after Melick's first paying gig at Doris Mae's Dance Studio. This event was the largest dance the Jack Melick Orchestra has ever performed.
