= North Plainfield, New Jersey =

Borough in Somerset County, New Jersey, US

- Borough
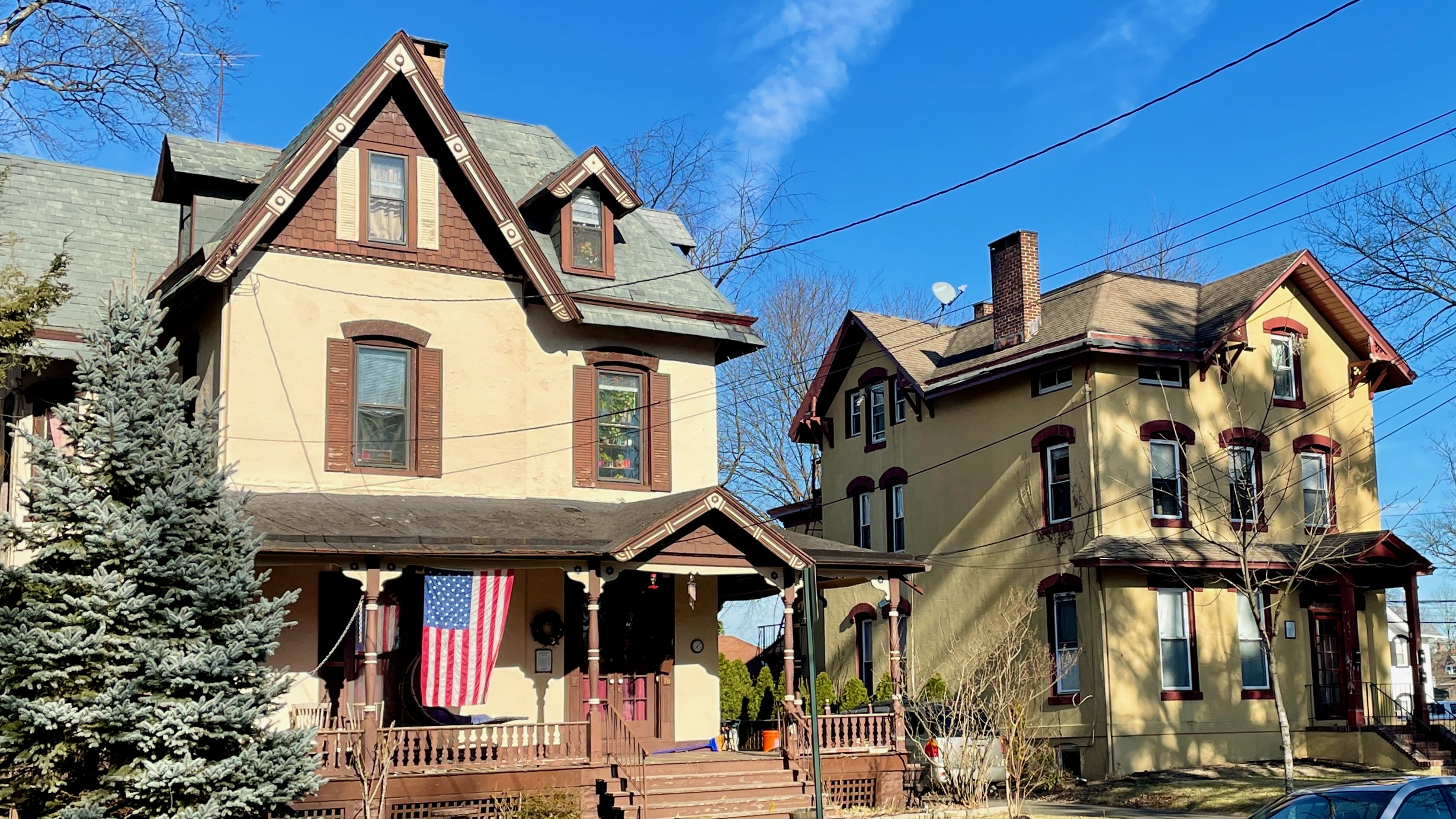
- Washington Park Historic District

- Seal

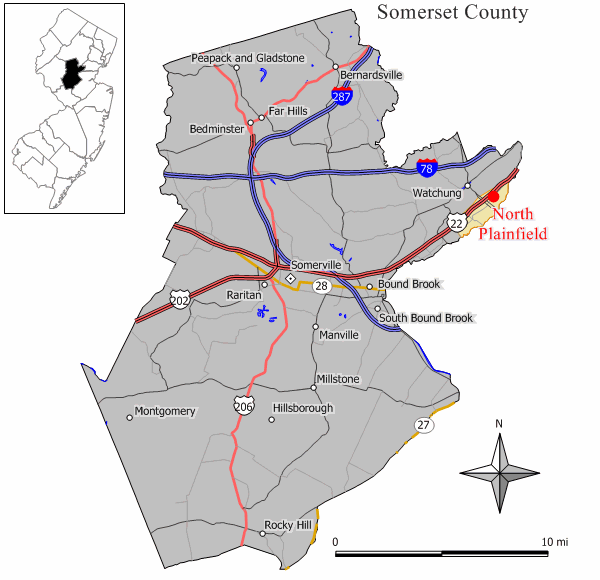
- Location of North Plainfield in Somerset County highlighted in yellow (right). Inset map: Location of Somerset County in New Jersey highlighted in black (left).

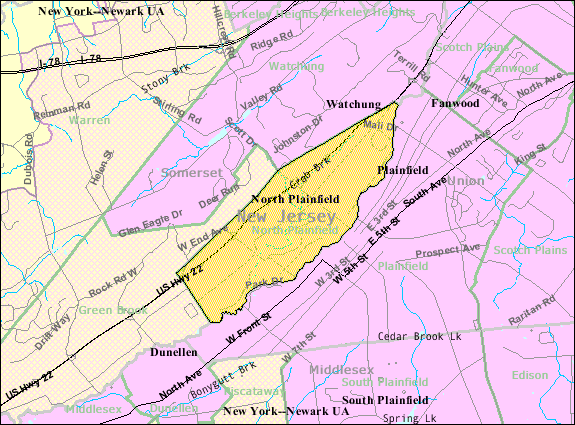
- Census Bureau map of North Plainfield, New Jersey

- Location in Somerset County Location in New Jersey Location in the United States
- Coordinates: 40.621255°N 74.439466°W
- Country: United States
- State: New Jersey
- County: Somerset
- Incorporated: June 9, 1885

Government
  - Type: Mayor-Council
  - Body: Borough Council
  - Mayor: Lawrence J. La Ronde (D, term ends December 31, 2024)
  - Administrator: David E. Hollod
  - Municipal clerk: Michele Garry (acting)

Area
  - Total: 2.82 sq mi (7.31 km^{2})
  - Land: 2.81 sq mi (7.27 km^{2})
  - Water: 0.012 sq mi (0.03 km^{2}) 0.46%
  - Rank: 351st of 565 in state 14th of 21 in county
- Elevation: 72 ft (22 m)

Population (2020)
  - Total: 22,808
  - Estimate (2023): 22,566
  - Rank: 118th of 565 in state 6th of 21 in county
  - Density: 8,125.4/sq mi (3,137.2/km^{2})
  - Rank: 47th of 565 in state 1st of 21 in county
- Time zone: UTC−05:00 (Eastern (EST))
  - Summer (DST): UTC−04:00 (Eastern (EDT))
- ZIP Code: 07060, 07062, 07063
- Area codes: 732 and 908
- FIPS code: 3403553280
- GNIS feature ID: 0885326
- Website: northplainfieldnj.gov

North Plainfield is a borough in Somerset County, in the U.S. state of New Jersey. It is located within the Raritan Valley region. As of the 2020 United States census, the borough's population was 22,808, an increase of 872 (+4.0%) from the 2010 census count of 21,936, which in turn reflected an increase of 833 (+3.9%) from the 21,103 counted in the 2000 census.

North Plainfield Township was created from portions of Warren Township by an act of the New Jersey Legislature passed on April 2, 1872. The borough of North Plainfield became an independent municipality on June 9, 1885. The name derives from Plainfield, which in turn derived its name from a local estate and for its scenic location.

In 1902, the New Jersey Legislature approved measures that would have allowed the borough to become part of Union County (a measure repealed in 1903) and to allow for a merger of North Plainfield with the City of Plainfield subject to the approval of a referendum by voters in both municipalities.

North Plainfield is home to the Washington Park Historic District, which was listed on the National Register of Historic Places in 1987.

== Geography ==
According to the United States Census Bureau, North Plainfield borough had a total area of 2.82 square miles (7.31 km^{2}), including 2.81 square miles (7.27 km^{2}) of land and 0.01 square miles (0.03 km^{2}) of water (0.46%).

The borough is bordered by the municipalities of Watchung to the north, Green Brook Township to the southwest, all in Somerset County; and to the south by Plainfield in Union County.

North Plainfield is in the northern division of the Raritan Valley along with Green Brook Township. The borough lies within the Raritan River watershed and has an elevation of approximately 89 feet (27 m) above sea level.

== Demographics ==
Historical population
Census	Pop.	Note	%±
1900	5,009		—
1910	6,117		22.1%
1920	6,916		13.1%
1930	9,760		41.1%
1940	10,586		8.5%
1950	12,766		20.6%
1960	16,993		33.1%
1970	21,796		28.3%
1980	19,108		−12.3%
1990	18,820		−1.5%
2000	21,103		12.1%
2010	21,936		3.9%
2020	22,808		4.0%
2023 (est.)	22,566	▼	−1.1%
Population sources: 1800–1920; 1900–1910 1910–1930; 1940–2000 2000; 2010 2020

=== 2020 census ===
As of the 2020 census, North Plainfield had a population of 22,808. The median age was 36.9 years. 22.8% of residents were under the age of 18 and 11.1% of residents were 65 years of age or older. For every 100 females there were 99.9 males, and for every 100 females age 18 and over there were 99.1 males age 18 and over.

100.0% of residents lived in urban areas, while 0.0% lived in rural areas.

There were 7,715 households in North Plainfield, of which 36.8% had children under the age of 18 living in them. Of all households, 45.7% were married-couple households, 18.8% were households with a male householder and no spouse or partner present, and 27.1% were households with a female householder and no spouse or partner present. About 22.9% of all households were made up of individuals and 6.8% had someone living alone who was 65 years of age or older.

There were 8,055 housing units, of which 4.2% were vacant. The homeowner vacancy rate was 1.3% and the rental vacancy rate was 3.7%.

Racial composition as of the 2020 census
Race	Number	Percent
White	6,078	26.6%
Black or African American	4,561	20.0%
American Indian and Alaska Native	243	1.1%
Asian	1,074	4.7%
Native Hawaiian and Other Pacific Islander	10	0.0%
Some other race	7,163	31.4%
Two or more races	3,679	16.1%
Hispanic or Latino (of any race)	11,548	50.6%

=== 2010 census ===
The 2010 United States census counted 21,936 people, 7,448 households, and 5,266 families in the borough. The population density was 7,850.0 per square mile (3,030.9/km^{2}). There were 7,848 housing units at an average density of 2,808.5 per square mile (1,084.4/km^{2}). The racial makeup was 55.01% (12,066) White, 18.85% (4,134) Black or African American, 0.29% (63) Native American, 5.81% (1,275) Asian, 0.05% (12) Pacific Islander, 16.00% (3,510) from other races, and 3.99% (876) from two or more races. Hispanic or Latino of any race were 44.21% (9,699) of the population.

Of the 7,448 households, 35.8% had children under the age of 18; 48.3% were married couples living together; 15.0% had a female householder with no husband present and 29.3% were non-families. Of all households, 22.8% were made up of individuals and 6.1% had someone living alone who was 65 years of age or older. The average household size was 2.94 and the average family size was 3.40.

24.5% of the population were under the age of 18, 8.9% from 18 to 24, 33.0% from 25 to 44, 25.2% from 45 to 64, and 8.4% who were 65 years of age or older. The median age was 35.1 years. For every 100 females, the population had 100.8 males. For every 100 females ages 18 and older there were 98.5 males.

The Census Bureau's 2006–2010 American Community Survey showed that (in 2010 inflation-adjusted dollars) median household income was $67,815 (with a margin of error of +/− $2,878) and the median family income was $70,359 (+/− $5,666). Males had a median income of $42,766 (+/− $2,549) versus $43,057 (+/− $3,208) for females. The per capita income for the borough was $27,529 (+/− $1,466). About 5.3% of families and 7.3% of the population were below the poverty line, including 11.8% of those under age 18 and 6.7% of those age 65 or over.

=== 2000 census ===
As of the 2000 United States census there were 21,103 people, 7,202 households, and 5,084 families residing in the borough. The population density was 7,565.0 inhabitants per square mile (2,920.9/km^{2}). There were 7,393 housing units at an average density of 2,650.2 per square mile (1,023.2/km^{2}). The racial makeup of the borough was 63.06% White, 13.38% African American, 0.28% Native American, 5.04% Asian, 0.08% Pacific Islander, 13.68% from other races, and 4.48% from two or more races. Hispanic or Latino of any race were 32.77% of the population.

There were 7,202 households, out of which 37.0% had children under the age of 18 living with them, 52.7% were married couples living together, 11.8% had a female householder with no husband present, and 29.4% were non-families. 23.2% of all households were made up of individuals, and 7.0% had someone living alone who was 65 years of age or older. The average household size was 2.90 and the average family size was 3.40.

In the borough the population was spread out, with 25.8% under the age of 18, 8.7% from 18 to 24, 36.5% from 25 to 44, 19.6% from 45 to 64, and 9.5% who were 65 years of age or older. The median age was 34 years. For every 100 females there were 97.3 males. For every 100 females age 18 and over, there were 96.8 males.

The median income for a household in the borough was $55,322, and the median income for a family was $62,875. Males had a median income of $39,662 versus $30,816 for females. The per capita income for the borough was $22,791. About 4.4% of families and 6.4% of the population were below the poverty line, including 6.5% of those under age 18 and 10.4% of those age 65 or over.

As of the 2000 Census, 5.39% of North Plainfield's residents identified themselves as being of Ecuadorian ancestry, which was the fourth highest of any municipality in New Jersey and the eighth highest percentage of Ecuadorian people in any place in the United States with 1,000 or more residents identifying their ancestry.

== Government ==
=== Local government ===
The Borough of North Plainfield is governed within the Faulkner Act under the Mayor-Council system of municipal government (Plan E), implemented as of January 1, 1977, based on the recommendations of a Charter Study Commission. The borough is one of 71 municipalities (of the 564) statewide governed under this form. The governing body is comprised of the mayor and the borough council. This form provides for a strong-mayor type of government, in which the mayor has executive functions and the legislative branch is the borough council. The councilmembers and mayor are elected in even-numbered years at the November general election to staggered four-year terms of office in partisan elections on an at-large basis, with four council seats up for election together and then the mayor and the other three council seats up for election at the same time, two years later. The Municipal Judge is appointed by the mayor with the advice and consent of the council, and serves for three years. The mayor runs the borough on a day-to-day basis and ensures the enforcement of the legislation passed by the council.

As of 2022, the Mayor of North Plainfield is Democrat Lawrence J. La Ronde, whose term of office ends December 31, 2024. Members of the North Plainfield Borough Council are Council President Frank A. "Skip" Stabile III (D, 2024), Council Vice President Everett Merrill (D, 2022), Aimee Corzo (D, 2024), Suezette Given (D, 2022; elected to serve an unexpired term), Steve McIntyre (D, 2022; elected to serve an unexpired term), Keiona R. Miller (D, 2024) and Wendy Schaefer (D, 2022).

In January 2021, the borough council selected Steve McIntyre from a list of three candidate submitted by the Democratic municipal committee to fill the vacant council seat expiring in December 2022 that had been held by Lawrence La Ronde who stepped down from the council to take office as mayor. Later that month, the borough council selected Suezette Given from a list of three submitted individuals to fill the seat expiring in December 2022 that had been held by Douglass M. Singleterry until he resigned from office on the last day of December to take office on the Somerset County Board of County Commissioners. McIntyre and Given served on an interim basis until the November 2021 general election, when they were both elected to serve the balance of the terms of office.

In August 2018, the borough council selected Aimee Corzo from a list of three candidates nominated by the Democratic municipal committee to fill the seat expiring in December 2020 that had been held by Frank Righetti until he resigned from office. Corzo served on an interim basis until the November 2018 general election, when she was elected to serve the balance of the term of office.

=== Federal, state, and county representation ===
North Plainfield is located in the 12th Congressional District and is part of New Jersey's 22nd state legislative district.

For the 119th United States Congress, New Jersey's 12th congressional district is represented by Bonnie Watson Coleman (D, Ewing Township). New Jersey is represented in the United States Senate by Democrats Cory Booker (Newark, term ends 2027) and Andy Kim (Moorestown, term ends 2031).

For the 2026–2027 session, the 22nd legislative district of the New Jersey Legislature is represented in the State Senate by Nicholas Scutari (D, Linden) and in the General Assembly by Linda S. Carter (D, Plainfield) and James J. Kennedy (D, Rahway).

Somerset County is governed by a five-member Board of County Commissioners, whose members are elected at-large to three-year terms of office on a staggered basis, with one or two seats coming up for election each year. At an annual reorganization meeting held in the first week of January, the board selects a Director and deputy director from among its members. As of 2025, Somerset County's County Commissioners are Director Shanel Robinson (D, Franklin Township, term as commissioner ends 2027; term as director ends 2026), Deputy Director Paul Drake (D, Hillsborough Township, term as commissioner and as deputy director ends 2026), Melonie Marano (D, Green Brook Township, 2028), Elizabeth Graner (D, Bernards Township, 2026; elected to serve an unexpired term) and Sara Sooy (D, Bedminster Township, 2027).

Constitutional officers, elected on a countywide basis are Clerk Steve Peter (D, Somerville, 2027), Sheriff Darrin Russo (D, Franklin Township, 2028) and Surrogate Bernice "Tina" Jalloh (D, Franklin Township, 2030).

=== Politics ===
As of March 2011, there were a total of 9,738 registered voters in North Plainfield, of which 3,403 (34.9% vs. 26.0% countywide) were registered as Democrats, 1,582 (16.2% vs. 25.7%) were registered as Republicans and 4,746 (48.7% vs. 48.2%) were registered as Unaffiliated. There were 7 voters registered as Libertarians or Greens. Among the borough's 2010 Census population, 44.4% (vs. 60.4% in Somerset County) were registered to vote, including 58.8% of those ages 18 and over (vs. 80.4% countywide).

United States presidential election results for North Plainfield
Year	Republican		Democratic		Third party(ies)	
Year	No.	%	No.	%	No.	%
2024	2,441	32.38%	4,959	65.79%	138	1.83%
2020	2,020	25.09%	5,927	73.61%	105	1.30%
2016	1,824	25.55%	5,089	71.28%	226	3.17%
2012	1,671	26.16%	4,655	72.88%	61	0.96%
2008	2,219	30.64%	4,938	68.20%	84	1.16%
2004	2,650	40.33%	3,861	58.76%	60	0.91%
2000	2,298	39.81%	3,274	56.72%	200	3.47%

In the 2012 presidential election, Democrat Barack Obama received 72.9% of the vote (4,655 cast), ahead of Republican Mitt Romney with 26.2% (1,671 votes), and other candidates with 1.0% (61 votes), among the 6,432 ballots cast by the borough's 10,444 registered voters (45 ballots were spoiled), for a turnout of 61.6%. In the 2008 presidential election, Democrat Barack Obama received 4,938 votes (67.5% vs. 52.1% countywide), ahead of Republican John McCain with 2,219 votes (30.3% vs. 46.1%) and other candidates with 84 votes (1.1% vs. 1.1%), among the 7,317 ballots cast by the borough's 9,825 registered voters, for a turnout of 74.5% (vs. 78.7% in Somerset County). In the 2004 presidential election, Democrat John Kerry received 3,861 votes (58.5% vs. 47.2% countywide), ahead of Republican George W. Bush with 2,650 votes (40.2% vs. 51.5%) and other candidates with 60 votes (0.9% vs. 0.9%), among the 6,597 ballots cast by the borough's 8,891 registered voters, for a turnout of 74.2% (vs. 81.7% in the whole county).

Gubernatorial election results for North Plainfield
Year	Republican		Democratic		Third party(ies)	
Year	No.	%	No.	%	No.	%
2025	1,359	23.01%	4,472	75.71%	76	1.29%
2021	1,278	30.91%	2,833	68.53%	23	0.56%
2017	1,082	29.54%	2,485	67.84%	96	2.62%
2013	1,658	48.79%	1,681	49.47%	59	1.74%
2009	1,744	41.88%	2,119	50.89%	301	7.23%
2005	1,600	39.42%	2,267	55.85%	192	4.73%

In the 2013 gubernatorial election, Democrat Barbara Buono received 49.5% of the vote (1,681 cast), ahead of Republican Chris Christie with 48.8% (1,658 votes), and other candidates with 1.7% (59 votes), among the 3,453 ballots cast by the borough's 10,602 registered voters (55 ballots were spoiled), for a turnout of 32.6%. In the 2009 gubernatorial election, Democrat Jon Corzine received 2,119 ballots cast (50.3% vs. 34.1% countywide), ahead of Republican Chris Christie with 1,744 votes (41.4% vs. 55.8%), Independent Chris Daggett with 255 votes (6.1% vs. 8.7%) and other candidates with 46 votes (1.1% vs. 0.7%), among the 4,214 ballots cast by the borough's 9,840 registered voters, yielding a 42.8% turnout (vs. 52.5% in the county).

United States Senate election results for North Plainfield1
Year	Republican		Democratic		Third party(ies)	
Year	No.	%	No.	%	No.	%
2024	2,120	29.86%	4,788	67.45%	191	2.69%
2018	1,559	27.10%	3,977	69.13%	217	3.77%
2012	1,550	25.57%	4,419	72.90%	93	1.53%
2006	1,607	39.44%	2,334	57.28%	134	3.29%

United States Senate election results for North Plainfield2
Year	Republican		Democratic		Third party(ies)	
Year	No.	%	No.	%	No.	%
2020	1,959	24.60%	5,875	73.78%	129	1.62%
2014	985	31.17%	2,118	67.03%	57	1.80%
2013	814	33.64%	1,575	65.08%	31	1.28%
2008	2,156	32.18%	4,327	64.58%	217	3.24%

== Education ==
The North Plainfield School District, serves public school students from pre-kindergarten through twelfth grade. As of the 2018–19 school year, the district, comprised of six schools, had an enrollment of 3,342 students and 304.0 classroom teachers (on an FTE basis), for a student–teacher ratio of 11.0:1. Schools in the district (with 2018–19 enrollment data from the National Center for Education Statistics) are East End Elementary School (423 students; in grades Pre-K–4), Stony Brook Elementary School (253; Pre-K–4), West End Elementary School (488; K–4), Somerset Intermediate School (516; 5–6), North Plainfield Middle School (544; 7–8) and North Plainfield High School (1,052; 9–12).

== Transportation ==
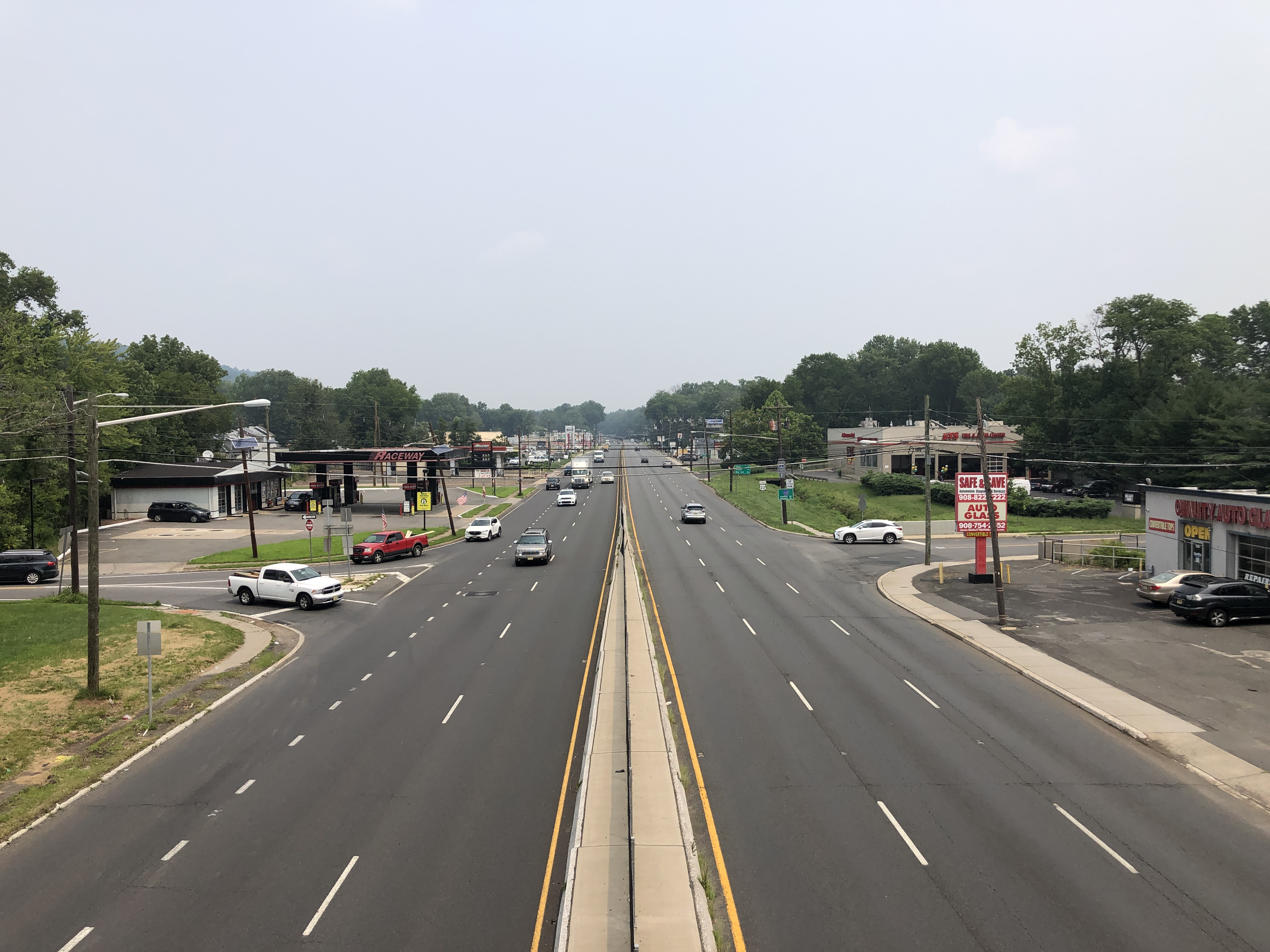
U.S. Route 22 in North Plainfield, the largest and busiest highway in the borough

=== Roads and highways ===
As of May 2010, the borough has a total of 49.77 miles (80.10 km) of roads, of which 39.28 miles (63.22 km) were maintained by the municipality, 7.22 miles (11.62 km) by the county and 3.27 miles (5.26 km) by the New Jersey Department of Transportation.

Major roadways in the borough include U.S. Route 22. County Route 531 also passes through.

=== Public transportation ===
NJ Transit commuter rail service is available at the Plainfield station. Trains operate on the Raritan Valley Line to Newark Penn Station, with connecting service to Hoboken Terminal and New York Penn Station.

NJ Transit bus service to and from the Port Authority Bus Terminal in Midtown Manhattan is available on the 114 and 117 routes, to Newark on the 65 and 66 routes, with local service on the 822 and 986 routes.

Starting in May 2017, Community Access Transit began operating the 2R bus from North Plainfield to Raritan Valley Community College, with stops in Somerville and Raritan.

== Notable people ==
People who were born in, residents of, or otherwise closely associated with North Plainfield include:

- Alex Abrahantes (born 1977), professional wrestler, manager and on-air television personality
- Hank Beenders (1916–2003), one of the first foreign-born players in what is now the NBA
- Jack Bicknell (born 1938), retired American football coach at the college level and in the various incarnations of NFL Europe
- Jack Bicknell Jr. (born 1963), football coach who had been an assistant offensive line coach with the New York Giants
- Kay Blumetta (1923–1997), pitcher who played in the All-American Girls Professional Baseball League
- Dan Canter (1961–2020), soccer defender who played three seasons in the North American Soccer League and three in Major Indoor Soccer League, in addition to playing with the United States men's national soccer team
- Pete Carmichael (1941–2016), former football coach
- Anne Casale (1930–2002), cookbook author, raised in North Plainfield
- Allan Crite (1910–2007), artist
- John DiMaggio (born 1968), actor who has performed the voice of Bender on Futurama
- Charles Aubrey Eaton (1868–1953), clergyman and politician who represented New Jersey's 4th congressional district from 1925–1933 and New Jersey's 5th congressional district from 1933–1953
- Bill Evans (1929–1980), jazz musician
- Bill Feaster (1904–1950), professional football player who spent two seasons in the National Football League with the Orange/Newark Tornadoes
- David T. Kenney (1866–1922), vacuum cleaner inventor and manufacturer
- Anthony Krizan, lead guitarist for the Spin Doctors
- Richard Larson (born 1943), operations researcher and educator, who has been a faculty member at the Massachusetts Institute of Technology
- Harry Leahey (1935–1990), jazz guitarist and teacher
- Warren McLaughlin (1876–1923), Major League Baseball pitcher who played for the Philadelphia Phillies and Pittsburgh Pirates
- Jack Melick (1929–2021), bandleader, pianist and arranger
- Barry Miles (born 1947), pianist, drummer, composer and producer
- Dorian Missick (born 1976), actor, known for his role as Damian in the television series Six Degrees and for voicing Victor Vance in the video game Grand Theft Auto: Vice City Stories
- Serge Ngoma (born 2005), soccer player who plays as a winger for Major League Soccer club New York Red Bulls
- Molly Price (born 1966), actress
- Jorge Rodriguez-Gerada (born 1966), Cuban-born contemporary artist
- Steve Schmidt (born 1970), senior campaign strategist to the 2008 presidential campaign of Senator John McCain
- John R. Winckler (1916–2001), physicist best known for his discovery of sprites, a variety of lightning found in the upper atmosphere
