= Manual vacuum cleaner =

Non-electric vacuum cleaner

The manual vacuum cleaner was a type of non-electric vacuum cleaner, using suction to remove dirt from carpets, being powered by human muscle, similar in use to a manual lawn mower. Its invention is dated to the second half of the 19th century, when patents were granted to inventors in the United States, Britain, France, and elsewhere.

== Mechanics ==
These household appliances created suction by either a pumping action, bellows, a piston being pushed up and down a tube, or had a fan driven by the wheels. Most required the efforts of two people. The models operable by one person were less efficient, but none were truly labor-saving devices or delivered the cleaning efficiency they promised. Besides hand-operated models, foot-operated models were also available, and according to a Swiss source there was even one where the operator sat in a rocking chair, rocking back and forth to produce the energy needed to create suction.

== Major models ==
=== The Baby ===
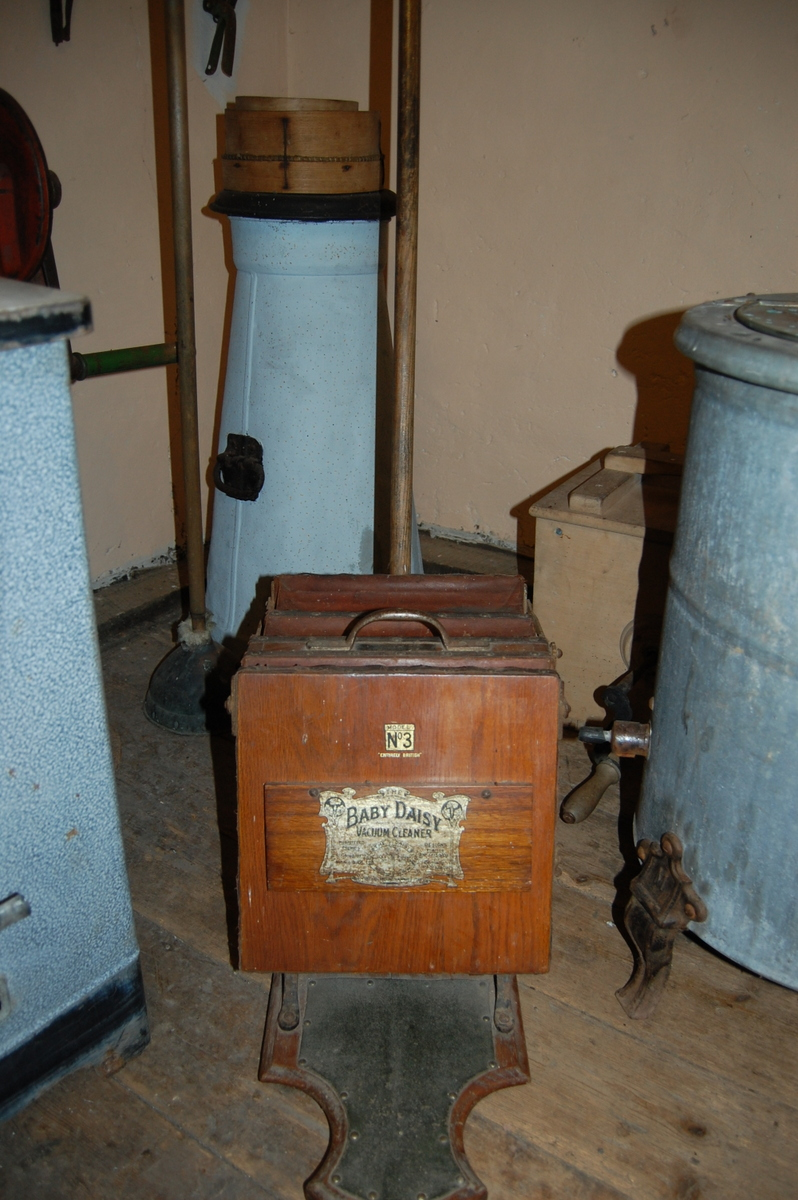
A Baby Daisy manual vacuum cleaner

The Baby Daisy was a manual vacuum cleaner designed in France around 1890 but built in Britain. It required two people to operate it. The first person had to stand on the base of the bellows, moving it back and forth with the aid of a broomstick in the holder on the front.

"This movement was a key design feature as it has a double connected bellows, meaning that movement in either direction created a vacuum." The second person could use the attached hose then to clean the house. The dust was collected in a cotton bag within the machine. An example of this can be seen at the Walthamstow Pumphouse Museum

=== The Burger Vacuum Cleaner ===
In 1898, Franz Burger of Fort Wayne, Ind. patented (#614,832 (Nov. 29, 1898) a "machine for cleaning fabrics", consisting of dual steam-powered "vacuum-chambers" (the first known use of the term "vacuum" for a cleaning device), a boxlike rectangular "extractor" with a perforated face and rollers to be pressed to the fabric, and a flexible connecting tube with a rigid tubular handle with a hand valve to turn off the suction when not needed; the whole unit could be mounted on a stationary base in a building or on a wheeled truck.

=== The Spencer Turbine Vacuum Cleaner ===
In 1905, Ira Hobart Spencer (1873-1928) founded the Spencer Turbine Cleaner Co. in Hartford, Connecticut to make the Turbine Vacuum Cleaner, a stationary installed vacuum cleaning system with lightweight hoses that operates on only 5 inches of water suction, with a trademarked "sugar scoop" housing profile.

=== The Kendall Vacuum Cleaner ===
In 1909, Oliver S. Kendall (died 1914) of Worcester, Mass. introduced the pump-type Pneu-Simplex Vacuum Cleaner, in a wooden housing.

=== Sears, Roebuck & Co. Manual Vacuum Cleaners ===
Three different models of manual vacuum cleaners were sold by Sears, Roebuck & Co. between 1909 and 1917, the lightweight Quick and Easy, the valve-and-piston pump type Dust Killer, and the bellows-type Everybody's Vacuum Cleaner. Their main market was in rural areas, where as late as 1935, the year of passage of the Rural Electrification Act, 90% of American farms (out of 6.8 million, the peak) did not yet have electricity.

=== The Kotten Vacuum Cleaner ===
In 1910, Herman G. Kotten of Englewood, N.J. patented (#975,435, Nov. 15, 1910) the Kotten Vacuum Cleaner, which required the operator to stand on a platform and "rock from side to side like a teeter-totter, activating two bellows."

=== The Star Vacuum Cleaner ===
In 1911, the Star Vacuum Cleaner was patented in the U.K. (#18,899), consisting of a concertina-like drum that was pushed up and down the handle to suck dust through the cleaning head. While simple in theory, pumping the handle up & down while pushing it round the floor is not something humans find at all easy to do. The initial price was 54 shillings; it was discontinued in 1938.

=== The Golden Rod Vacuum Cleaner ===
In 1911, the plunger-type canister Golden Rod Vacuum Cleaner was patented (#1,012,800, Dec. 26, 1911) by Charles Boyer of Marengo, Illinois, and produced by the Hugro Manufacturing Co. of Warsaw, Indiana.

=== 1922 Friction Motor Vacuum Cleaner ===
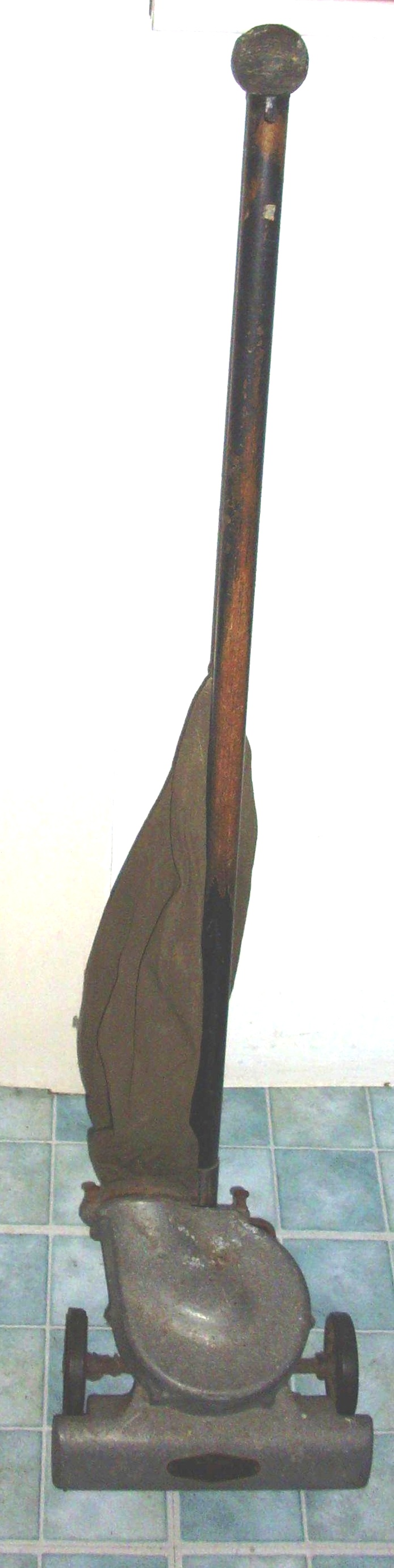
WW1 Hoover

This (see photo) is powered by a friction motor similar to but larger than those powering toy cars. It operates like a modern upright vacuum cleaner, except that it needs to be operated faster to get good suction. This machine may be the first that was a practical effective non-electric labour saver that only required one user.

== Production in the United States ==
According to Thomas' Register of American Manufacturers, sales of manual vacuum cleaners peaked in 1914. In 1914 it lists 18 manufacturers offering hand-operated vacuum cleaners, and only eight in 1916; in 1914, it lists five offering water-powered vacuum cleaners, and only two in 1916.

== See also ==
- Vacuum cleaner
