= Franklin Township, Somerset County, New Jersey =

Township in Somerset County, New Jersey, US

Franklin Township, New Jersey
- Township
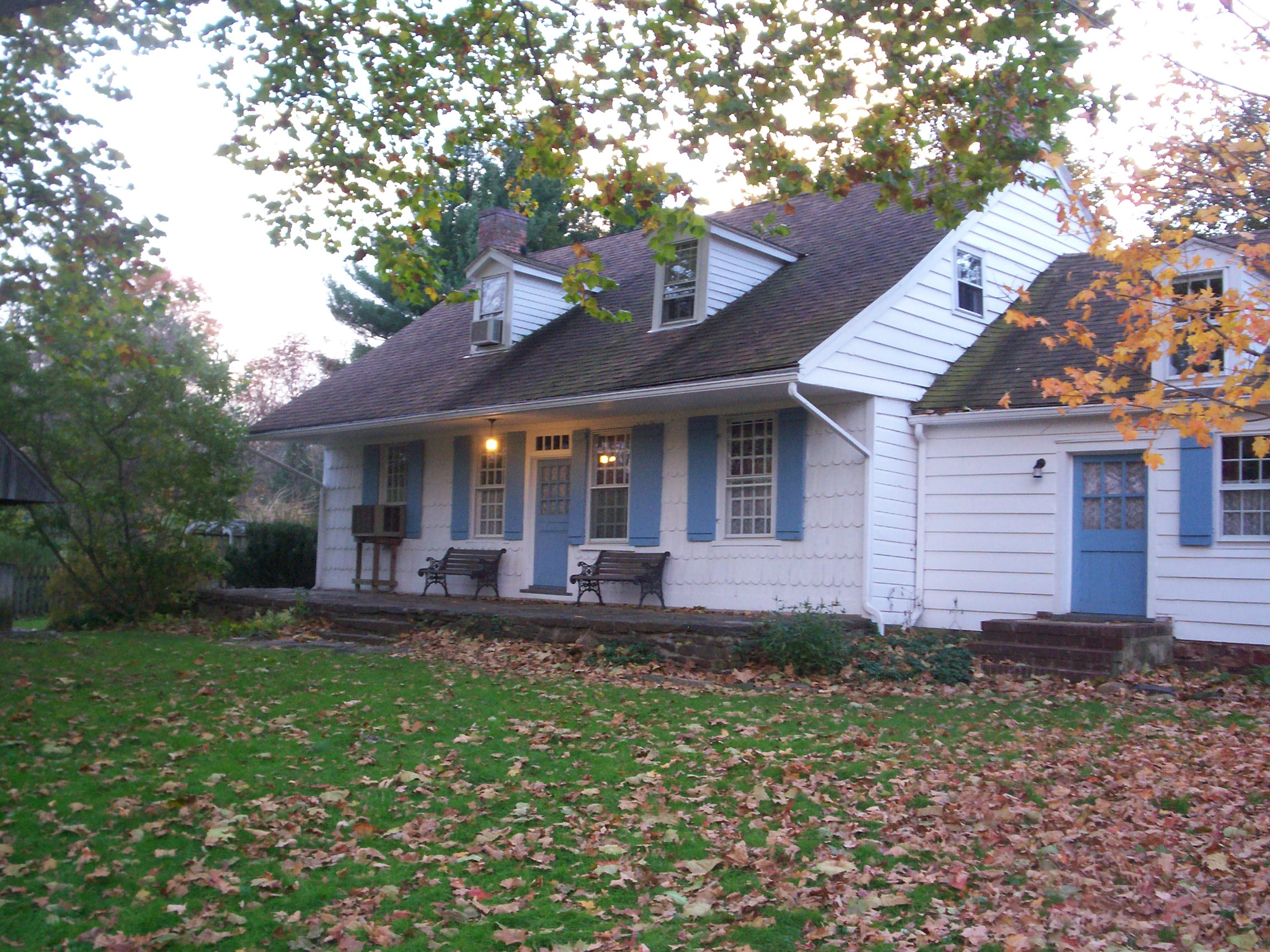
- Van Wickle House on Easton Avenue

- Seal

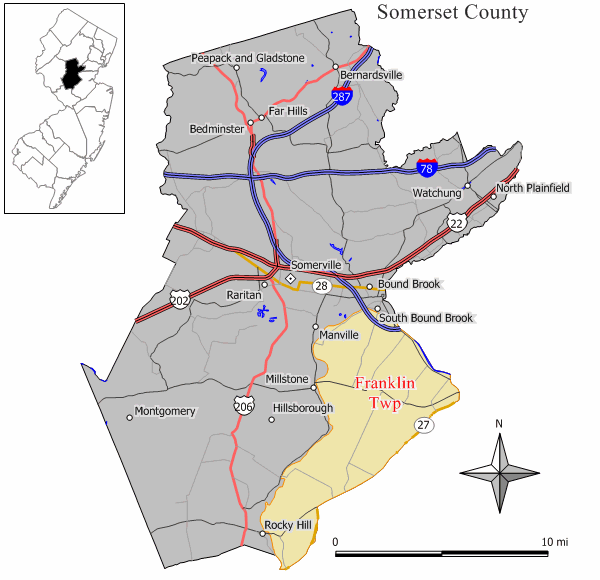
- Location of Franklin Township in Somerset County highlighted in yellow (right). Inset map: Location of Somerset County in New Jersey highlighted in black (left).

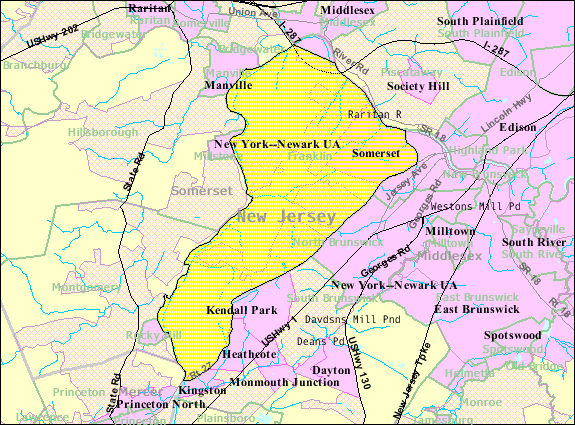
- Census Bureau map of Franklin Township, Somerset County, New Jersey
- Interactive map of Franklin Township, New Jersey
- Location in Somerset County Location in New Jersey Location in the United States
- Coordinates: 40.476872°N 74.550447°W
- Country: United States
- State: New Jersey
- County: Somerset
- Formed as Eastern precinct: c. 1745
- Incorporated: February 21, 1798
- Named for: Benjamin Franklin

Government
  - Type: Faulkner Act (council–manager)
  - Body: Township Council
  - Mayor: Phillip Kramer (D, term ends December 31, 2027)
  - Manager: Robert G. Vornlocker Jr.
  - Municipal clerk: Ann McCarthy

Area
  - Total: 46.88 sq mi (121.43 km^{2})
  - Land: 46.17 sq mi (119.58 km^{2})
  - Water: 0.71 sq mi (1.85 km^{2}) 1.52%
  - Rank: 37th of 565 in state 2nd of 21 in county
- Elevation: 62 ft (19 m)

Population (2020)
  - Total: 68,364
  - Estimate (2023): 68,233
  - Rank: 19th of 565 in state 1st of 21 in county
  - Density: 1,480.7/sq mi (571.7/km^{2})
  - Rank: 337th of 565 in state 8th of 21 in county
- Time zone: UTC−05:00 (Eastern (EST))
  - Summer (DST): UTC−04:00 (Eastern (EDT))
- ZIP Codes: 08873, 08875 – Somerset (also used as East Millstone); 08528 – Kingston; 08823 – Franklin Park; 08540 – Princeton; 08890 – Zarephath
- Area codes: 732, 908 and 609
- FIPS code: 3403524900
- GNIS feature ID: 0882170
- Website: www.franklintwpnj.org

Franklin Township is a township in Somerset County, in the U.S. state of New Jersey. It is centrally located in the Raritan Valley region within the New York Metropolitan Area. As of the 2020 United States census, the township's population was 68,364, an increase of 6,064 (+9.7%) from the 2010 census count of 62,300, which in turn reflected an increase of 11,397 (+22.4%) from the 50,903 counted in the 2000 census. The township was the state's 19th most-populous municipality in 2020, after being ranked 22nd in 2010.

Traditionally a farming community, it has become a fast-growing suburb with massive development in the late 20th and early 21st centuries, fostering a diverse blend of races, religions, and cultures. In 2008, Franklin Township ranked #5 on Money magazine's list of America's Top 100 Best Places to Live.

What is now Franklin Township was originally formed circa 1745 as Eastern precinct. Franklin Township was incorporated on February 21, 1798, as one of New Jersey's initial group of 104 townships by an act of the New Jersey Legislature. Portions of the township were taken to form South Bound Brook (formed within Township, became an independent municipality as of April 11, 1907) and East Millstone (formed on February 18, 1873, and returned to Franklin Township on December 31, 1949).

== History ==
It has been unclear if the township was named for founding father Benjamin Franklin or for his illegitimate son William Franklin, a Loyalist and the last Royal Governor of New Jersey (from 1763 to 1776). In 2000, after considering the evidence set forth by William B. Brahms in his books Images of America: Franklin Township (1997) and Franklin Township, Somerset County, NJ: A History, and The Case for William Franklin and The Case for Benjamin Franklin, the Township Council chose the theory that the township was indeed named for Benjamin Franklin.

Franklin Township was very much a part of Revolutionary War history and the scene of many raiding parties along Route 27, then known as the King's Highway. Two British generals, Cornwallis and DeHeister, tried to lure General George Washington and his Continental Army into battle on the plains of Middlebush and East Millstone. Washington, however, kept his troops at Chimney Rock, just north of Franklin, until the British withdrew. Several of the prosperous Middlebush farms were destroyed by the British soldiers during their retreat. In 1777, near the mill on the Millstone River at Weston, the Continental Army and local militia engaged and successfully drove off a British foraging party of about 600 troops, sent out of New Brunswick by General Cornwallis. On November 2, 1783, Washington composed his farewell address to the army while staying at Rockingham near Rocky Hill.

The construction of the Delaware and Raritan Canal in the 1830s, stretching 22 miles (35 km) to connect New York City and Philadelphia, led to significant growth in the township, with as much as 200,000 tons of goods shipped on barges using the canal by the 1860s. The rise of shipping commercial goods using railroads led to a substantial decline in canal traffic. The area has been restored as the Delaware and Raritan Canal State Park

The Van Wickle House, located next to the Delaware and Raritan Canal in the Somerset section of the township, in between New Brunswick and South Bound Brook, was built in 1722 by Dutch settlers and is now owned by Franklin Township and leased by the Meadows Foundation. Set back behind Easton Avenue, the home adjoins the Rutgers Preparatory School and a Revolutionary War-era graveyard.

Passenger and freight railroad service was available in Franklin Township during the later half of the 19th century via the Millstone and New Brunswick Railroad (M&NB) which opened in 1854. The railroad was built and operated by the Pennsylvania Railroad (PRR), from a junction with the PRR mainline at Jersey Avenue in New Brunswick to East Millstone. The M&NB is now known as the Conrail Millstone Secondary Branch. The branch line was still operated by Conrail up to just west of Clyde Road in Somerset for a time, serving local industry in the industrial section of Somerset. As of 2011, Hermann Warehouse Corp re-located out of the Clyde Road facility and there has not been rail service into that building since then. A bumper was placed east of the Somerset Road/Route 27 crossing, with Clyde Road, Veronica Avenue and Route 27 crossings currently out of service. Jersey Avenue/Route 91 remains the sole active crossing on the line.

In 1922, the infamous Hall-Mills Murder took place in Franklin Township, in the area adjacent to New Brunswick known as Somerset.

== Geography ==
According to the United States Census Bureau, the township had a total area of 46.88 square miles (121.43 km^{2}), including 46.17 square miles (119.58 km^{2}) of land and 0.71 square miles (1.85 km^{2}) of water (1.52%).

The community is approximately 75% rural.

The township borders the municipalities of Bridgewater Township, Hillsborough Township, Manville, Millstone, Montgomery Township, Rocky Hill and South Bound Brook in Somerset County; Princeton in Mercer County; New Brunswick, North Brunswick, Piscataway and South Brunswick in Middlesex County.

=== Communities ===
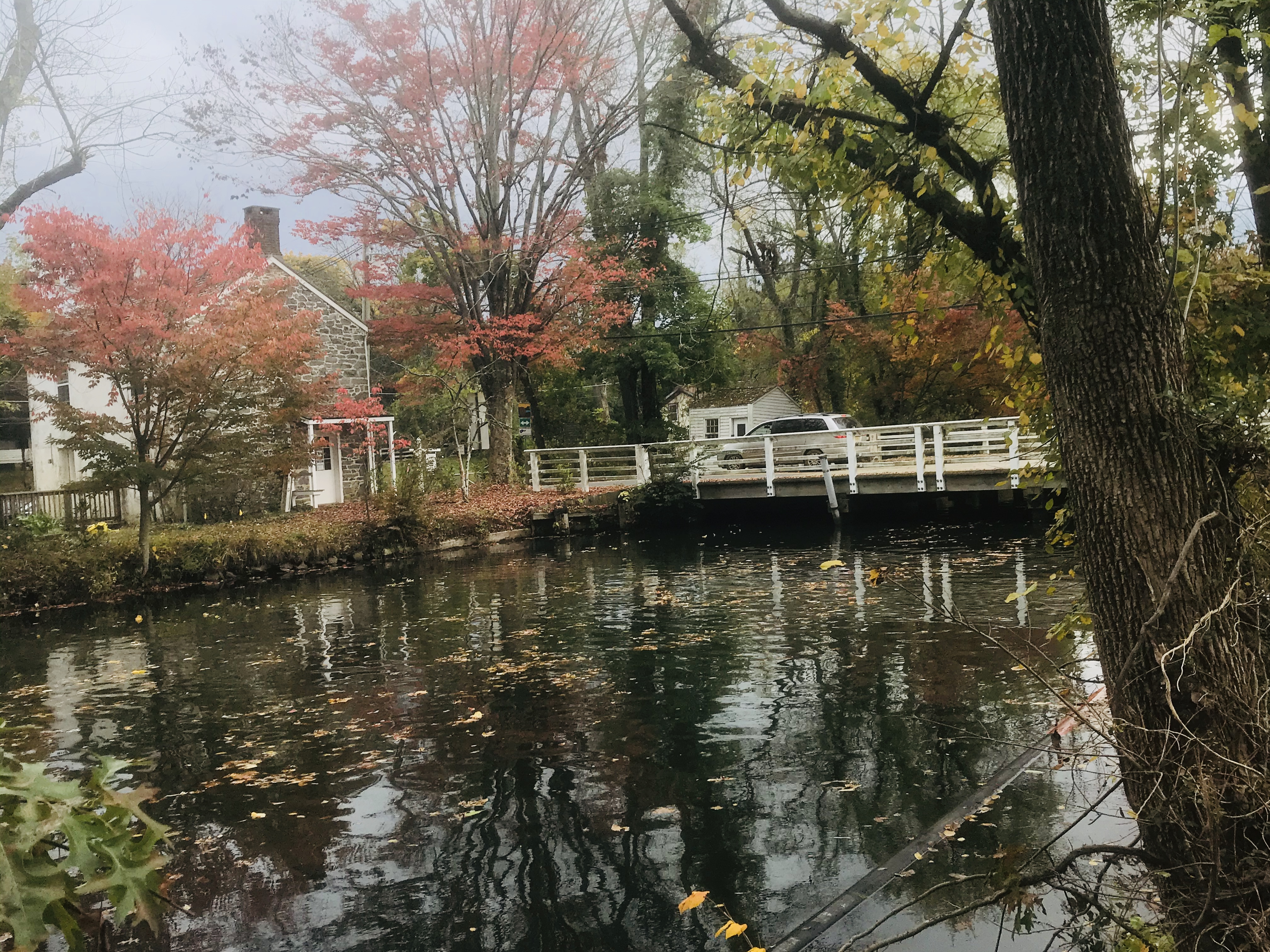
The D&R Canal in Griggstown during the Autumn months

The following are unincorporated communities and census-designated places (CDPs) located within Franklin Township:

- Blackwells Mills (2010 CDP population of 803)
- Clyde (2010 CDP population of 213)
- East Franklin (2010 CDP population of 8,669)
- East Millstone (2010 CDP population of 579)
- East Rocky Hill (2010 CDP population of 469)
- Franklin Center (2010 CDP population of 4,460)
- Franklin Park (2010 CDP population of 13,295)
- Griggstown (2010 CDP population of 819)
- Kingston – officially designated as a Village Center by the New Jersey State Planning Commission. The Kingston Village Advisory Committee, jointly appointed by the Councils of Franklin and South Brunswick townships, advises Franklin on matters of concern to Kingston's residents. (2010 CDP population of 271 for portion of Kingston in Franklin Township)
- Middlebush (2010 CDP population of 2,326)
- Pleasant Plains (2010 CDP population of 922)
- Six Mile Run (2010 CDP population of 3,184)
- Somerset (2010 CDP population of 22,083)
- Ten Mile Run (2010 CDP population of 1,959)
- Voorhees CDP (2010 CDP population of 976)
- Weston (2010 CDP population of 1,235)
- Zarephath, religious community in western part of the township, centered around the Pillar of Fire Church (2010 CDP population of 37)

Other unincorporated communities, localities, and place names located partially or completely within the township include Hamilton Park and Rockingham.

=== Ecology ===
According to the A. W. Kuchler U.S. potential natural vegetation types, Franklin Township would have an Appalachian Oak (104) vegetation type with an Eastern Hardwood Forest (25) vegetation form.

== Demographics ==
Historical population
Census	Pop.	Note	%±
1790	2,068		—
1810	2,539		—
1820	3,071		21.0%
1830	3,352		9.2%
1840	3,878		15.7%
1850	3,062		−21.0%
1860	3,599		17.5%
1870	3,912		8.7%
1880	3,147	*	−19.6%
1890	2,478		−21.3%
1900	2,398		−3.2%
1910	2,395	*	−0.1%
1920	2,955		23.4%
1930	5,675		92.0%
1940	5,912		4.2%
1950	9,601	*	62.4%
1960	19,858		106.8%
1970	30,389		53.0%
1980	31,358		3.2%
1990	42,780		36.4%
2000	50,903		19.0%
2010	62,300		22.4%
2020	68,364		9.7%
2023 (est.)	68,233		−0.2%
Population sources: 1790–1920 1840 1850–1870; 1850 1870 1880–1890; 1890–1910 1910–1930 1920–1940; 1940–2000 2000; 2010 2020 * = Territory change in previous decade.

=== 2020 census ===
Franklin township, Somerset County, New Jersey – Racial and Ethnic Composition (NH = Non-Hispanic) Note: the US Census treats Hispanic/Latino as an ethnic category. This table excludes Latinos from the racial categories and assigns them to a separate category. Hispanics/Latinos may be of any race.
Race / Ethnicity	Pop 1990	Pop 2000	Pop 2010	Pop 2020	% 1990	% 2000	% 2010	% 2020
White alone (NH)	28,823	26,226	24,198	21,405	67.37%	51.52%	38.84%	31.28%
Black or African American alone (NH)	8,916	12,888	15,888	16,531	20.84%	25.32%	25.50%	24.18%
Native American or Alaska Native alone (NH)	62	65	102	95	0.14%	0.13%	0.16%	0.14%
Asian alone (NH)	3,001	6,475	12,410	15,835	7.01%	12.72%	19.93%	23.13%
Pacific Islander alone (NH)	N/A	12	8	13	N/A	0.02%	0.01%	0.02%
Some Other Race alone (NH)	65	214	223	483	0.15%	0.42%	0.36%	0.71%
Mixed Race/Multi-Racial (NH)	N/A	896	1,421	2,064	N/A	1.76%	2.28%	3.02%
Hispanic or Latino (any race)	1,913	4,127	8,050	11,938	4.47%	8.11%	12.92%	17.53%
Total	42,780	50,903	62,300	68,364	100.00%	100.00%	100.00%	100.00%

=== 2010 census ===
The 2010 United States census counted 62,300 people, 23,301 households, and 15,938 families in the township. The population density was 1,350.0 per square mile (521.2/km^{2}). There were 24,426 housing units at an average density of 529.3 per square mile (204.4/km^{2}). The racial makeup was 44.76% (27,887) White, 26.55% (16,539) Black or African American, 0.29% (183) Native American, 19.98% (12,450) Asian, 0.01% (9) Pacific Islander, 5.11% (3,183) from other races, and 3.29% (2,049) from two or more races. Hispanic or Latino of any race were 12.92% (8,050) of the population.

Of the 23,301 households, 30.7% had children under the age of 18; 53.3% were married couples living together; 11.2% had a female householder with no husband present and 31.6% were non-families. Of all households, 25.7% were made up of individuals and 8.3% had someone living alone who was 65 years of age or older. The average household size was 2.63 and the average family size was 3.19.

22.1% of the population were under the age of 18, 7.4% from 18 to 24, 30.4% from 25 to 44, 26.4% from 45 to 64, and 13.7% who were 65 years of age or older. The median age was 38.3 years. For every 100 females, the population had 92.0 males. For every 100 females ages 18 and older there were 88.5 males.

The Census Bureau's 2006–2010 American Community Survey showed that (in 2010 inflation-adjusted dollars) median household income was $89,992 (with a margin of error of +/− $2,918) and the median family income was $103,060 (+/− $3,429). Males had a median income of $66,178 (+/− $2,448) versus $54,733 (+/− $2,427) for females. The per capita income for the borough was $40,036 (+/− $1,203). About 3.2% of families and 5.3% of the population were below the poverty line, including 7.9% of those under age 18 and 4.8% of those age 65 or over.

=== 2000 census ===
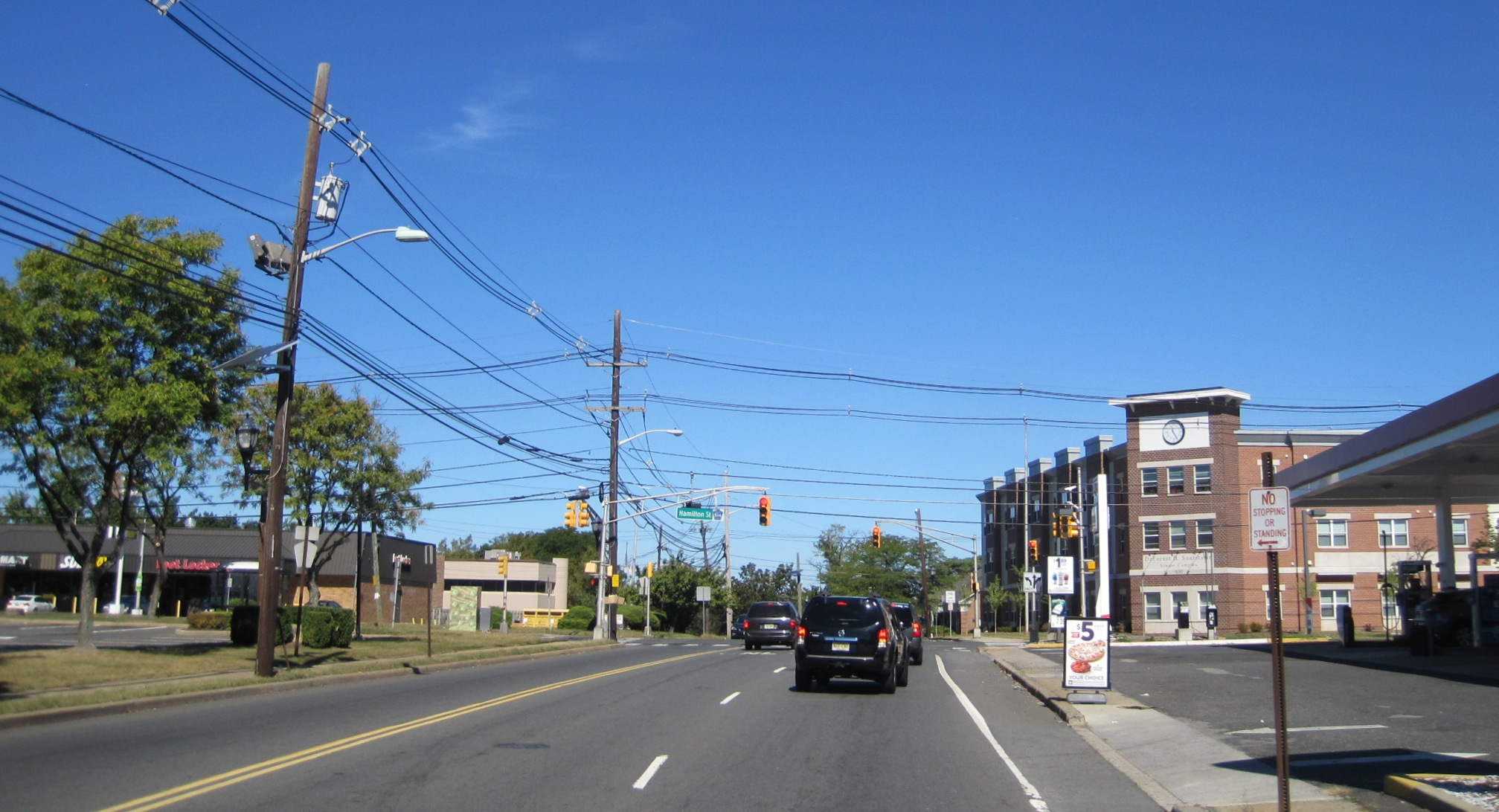
The Somerset neighborhood, one of the largest neighborhoods in the township

As of the 2000 United States census there were 50,903 people, 19,355 households, and 12,987 families residing in the township. The population density was 1,088.3 inhabitants per square mile (420.2/km^{2}). There were 19,789 housing units at an average density of 423.1 per square mile (163.4/km^{2}). The racial makeup of the township was 55.11% White, 25.98% African American, 0.18% Native American, 12.74% Asian, 0.04% Pacific Islander, 3.56% from other races, and 2.39% from two or more races. Hispanic or Latino of any race were 8.11% of the population.

There were 19,355 households, out of which 30.8% had children under the age of 18 living with them, 53.1% were married couples living together, 10.3% had a female householder with no husband present, and 32.9% were non-families. 25.7% of all households were made up of individuals, and 5.8% had someone living alone who was 65 years of age or older. The average household size was 2.58 and the average family size was 3.14.

In the township, the population was spread out, with 22.7% under the age of 18, 6.8% from 18 to 24, 36.9% from 25 to 44, 22.2% from 45 to 64, and 11.4% who were 65 years of age or older. The median age was 36 years. For every 100 females, there were 91.7 males. For every 100 females age 18 and over, there were 88.8 males.

The median income for a household in the township was $67,923, and the median income for a family was $78,177. Males had a median income of $52,351 versus $41,101 for females. The per capita income for the township was $31,209. About 3.1% of families and 5.1% of the population were below the poverty line, including 6.3% of those under age 18 and 5.2% of those age 65 or over.

== Parks and recreation ==
Parks in the township include:

- The William L. Hutcheson Memorial Forest is a 500-acre (2.0 km^{2}) natural preserve administered by Rutgers University that includes a 65-acre (260,000 m^{2}) virgin old-growth forest designated a National Natural Landmark, and is located at 2150 Amwell Road (Route 514) about 3/4 mile (1.2 km) east of East Millstone.
- Colonial Park, part of the Somerset County Park System, is a 685.5-acre (2.774 km^{2}) facility located in the western portion of Franklin Township near East Millstone with entrances off Mettlers Lane and Elizabeth Avenue. The park offers many recreational activities, including picnicking, hiking, biking, fishing, paddle boating, golf, and tennis. It features a 144-acre (0.58 km^{2}) Arboretum, "a living tree museum" that provides a wide range of examples of trees and shrubs that grow well in the Central Jersey environment. The park also offers a 3-acre (12,000 m^{2}) leash-free dog area, a 1.4-mile (2.3 km) fitness parcourse, paddleboat rentals, an 18-hole putting course, the 18 hole championship Spooky Brook Golf Course, 3 stocked fishing ponds, softball fields, a tennis center, playground, nature trail, a 5-acre (20,000 m^{2}) Perennial Garden, the Rudolf W. van der Goot Rose Garden, an accredited All-America Rose Selections (AARS) display garden, and the Fragrance and Sensory Garden, designed to be of special interest to visitors who are visually or physically impaired.
- A portion of the Delaware and Raritan Canal State Park runs for 22 miles (35 km) along much of the northern and western borders of Franklin Township eventually making its way as far south as Trenton with a feeder canal following the Delaware River north for another 22 miles (35 km) to Bull's Island near Frenchtown. The canal and adjacent tow path offer many recreational activities, from hiking and biking to fishing and boating. Access points with parking can be found near most road crossings of the canal, via bridges at Colonial Park (see above) and the Van Wickle House (see below) in Franklin Township as well as at many of the locks on the canal.
- The John W. Flemer Preserve is a 7.4-acre (30,000 m^{2}) preserve adjacent to the Delaware and Raritan Canal in Kingston that features a 2-mile (3.2 km) trail on the east bank of the Canal that offers a connection to the tow path on the west side of the Canal for a round trip hike.
- The Negri-Nepote Native Grassland Preserve is a 164-acre (0.66 km^{2}) preserve located between Bennets Lane and Skillmans Lane in the Somerset section that features 111-acre (0.45 km^{2}) of grassland, forest, and scrubland and a 2.5-acre (10,000 m^{2}) wetland attracting migratory birds and amphibians with over 3 miles (4.8 km) of pedestrian trails, bird boxes and interpretive signage.
- Six Mile Run Reservoir Site, part of the New Jersey Division of Parks and Forestry, is located in the central portion of Franklin Township. The 3,037-acre (12.29 km^{2}) park consists of land that was set aside in c. 1970 for water resource needs that still remains largely undeveloped and that offers numerous multi-use recreational trails. Access is provided via the former D&R Canal Main Office parking area off Canal Road just south of Blackwells Mills Road.
- Ten Mile Run Greenway is a 684-acre (2.77 km^{2}) greenway over 4 miles (6.4 km) in length running between Canal Road south of Bunker Hill Road in Griggstown and S. Middlebush Road near Old Vliet Road in Franklin Park. It runs along the Ten Mile Run. It features four sections including:
  - Bunker Hill Natural Area, accessed from the north side of Bunker Hill Road near the intersection of Route 27, features trails through mature forest and meadows and along Ten Mile Run stream. Trails connect to the Griggstown Native Grassland Preserve and the Catalpa Farm areas.
  - Catalpa Farm, on Old Vliet Road, offers trails along field edges and a small forest that connect to the Bunker Hill Natural Area.
  - Environmental Education Center, 255 Bunker Hill Road (parking is available at 287 Bunker Hill Road), is a 95-acre (38 ha) area that features a deciduous forest known as Graeber Woods, a one-mile (1.6 km) self-guided nature trail, the "Glass House", a home that has been renovated and is now used as a classroom and conference center to provide a wide range of instructional, hands-on activities in natural habitats, and a 20' climbing tower and a high ropes course adventure area. The Environmental Education Center is a cooperative effort of the Township of Franklin, the Franklin Township Board of Education, and the Green Acres Program. A trail connect to the Griggstown Native Grassland Preserve and the rest of the Ten Mile Run Greenway.
  - Griggstown Native Grassland Preserve accessed from Canal Road in Griggstown (1091 Canal Road) has over 100 acres (0.40 km^{2}) of grassland and hundreds of acres of forest and features over 6 miles (9.7 km) of mapped trails. Trails connect to the other sections of the Ten Mile Run Greenway.

== Government ==
=== Local government ===
The Township of Franklin is chartered under the Faulkner Act, formally known as the Optional Municipal Charter Law, within the Council-Manager, Plan D. The township is one of 42 municipalities (of the 564) statewide that use this form of government. The Township Council is comprised of nine members, including one from each of the five wards, three elected from the township at-large, and the mayor. The mayor is the Chief Legislative Officer of the township and is directly elected from the township at-large to serve a four-year term. The Township Manager is the chief executive officer overseeing the township's daily operations and is hired by and serves at the pleasure of the Township Council. Councilmembers are chosen for a four-year term in partisan elections held at the June Primary and November General Elections in odd-numbered years, with the five ward seats coming up for election together and the mayoral and at-large seats up for election two years later.

As of 2026, the Mayor of Franklin Township is Democrat Phillip Kramer, whose term of office ends December 31, 2027. Members of the Township Council are Deputy Mayor Shepa Uddin (D; 2nd Ward, 2025), Sivaraman Anbarasan (D; At-Large, 2023), Kimberly Francois (D; At-Large, 2027), Alex Kharazi (D; At-Large, 2027), Charles Onyejiaka (D; 3rd Ward, 2025), Ed Potosnak (D; 1st Ward, 2025), James Vassanella (D; 5th Ward, 2025) and Carl R. A. Wright (D; 4th Ward, 2025).

In the November 2015 general election, Phillip Kramer became the first Democrat directly elected as mayor in the township's history, resulting in the mayor and entire council being from the Democratic Party. This marked a transition that started in 1995, when the council was controlled 8 to 1 by the Republican Party. In January 2016, the Township Council selected Charles Onyejiaka from a list of three candidates nominated by the Democratic municipal committee to fill the Third Ward seat expiring in December 2017 that was vacated by Philip Kramer when he took office as mayor; Onyejiaka will serve on an interim basis until the November 2016 general election, when voters will select a candidate to fill the one-year balance of the term of office.

In January 2015, the Township Council chose Chris Kelly from among three candidates offered by the Republican municipal committee to fill the vacant seat of Brian D. Levine, who had resigned from his council seat to take office on the Somerset County Board of Chosen Freeholders.

In 1998, the township approved a referendum by a better than 2–1 margin to raise property taxes by 3 cents per $100 of assessed valuation, with the money to be used to preserve open space.

=== Federal, state and county representation ===
Franklin Township is located in the 12th Congressional District and is part of New Jersey's 17th state legislative district. Prior to the 2010 Census, Franklin Township had been split between the 6th Congressional District and the 12th Congressional District, a change made by the New Jersey Redistricting Commission that took effect in January 2013, based on the results of the November 2012 general elections.

For the 119th United States Congress, New Jersey's 12th congressional district is represented by Bonnie Watson Coleman (D, Ewing Township). New Jersey is represented in the United States Senate by Democrats Cory Booker (Newark, term ends 2027) and Andy Kim (Moorestown, term ends 2031).

For the 2026–2027 session, the 17th legislative district of the New Jersey Legislature is represented in the State Senate by Bob Smith (D, Piscataway) and in the General Assembly by Joseph Danielsen (D, Franklin Township) and Kevin Egan (D, New Brunswick).

Somerset County is governed by a five-member Board of County Commissioners, whose members are elected at-large to three-year terms of office on a staggered basis, with one or two seats coming up for election each year. At an annual reorganization meeting held in the first week of January, the board selects a Director and deputy director from among its members. As of 2025, Somerset County's County Commissioners are Director Shanel Robinson (D, Franklin Township, term as commissioner ends 2027; term as director ends 2026), Deputy Director Paul Drake (D, Hillsborough Township, term as commissioner and as deputy director ends 2026), Melonie Marano (D, Green Brook Township, 2028), Elizabeth Graner (D, Bernards Township, 2026; elected to serve an unexpired term) and Sara Sooy (D, Bedminster Township, 2027).

Constitutional officers, elected on a countywide basis are Clerk Steve Peter (D, Somerville, 2027), Sheriff Darrin Russo (D, Franklin Township, 2028) and Surrogate Bernice "Tina" Jalloh (D, Franklin Township, 2030).

=== Politics ===
As of March 2011, there were a total of 36,240 registered voters in Franklin Township, of which 13,993 (38.6% vs. 26.0% countywide) were registered as Democrats, 4,962 (13.7% vs. 25.7%) were registered as Republicans and 17,262 (47.6% vs. 48.2%) were registered as Unaffiliated. There were 23 voters registered to the Libertarian Party or other parties. Among the township's 2010 Census population, 58.2% (vs. 60.4% in Somerset County) were registered to vote, including 74.7% of those ages 18 and over (vs. 80.4% countywide).

United States presidential election results for Franklin Township
Year	Republican		Democratic		Third party(ies)	
Year	No.	%	No.	%	No.	%
2024	9,107	29.43%	20,829	67.31%	1,007	3.25%
2020	9,040	25.81%	25,587	73.06%	396	1.13%
2016	7,818	26.01%	21,375	71.12%	860	2.86%
2012	7,640	27.74%	19,611	71.21%	288	1.05%
2008	7,951	28.77%	19,442	70.34%	246	0.89%
2004	7,913	34.61%	14,737	64.46%	211	0.92%
2000	6,174	34.28%	11,216	62.28%	620	3.44%

In the 2012 presidential election, Democrat Barack Obama received 71.2% of the vote (19,611 cast), ahead of Republican Mitt Romney with 27.7% (7,640 votes), and other candidates with 1.0% (288 votes), among the 27,718 ballots cast by the township's 39,291 registered voters (179 ballots were spoiled), for a turnout of 70.5%. In the 2008 presidential election, Democrat Barack Obama received 19,442 votes (70.0% vs. 52.1% countywide), ahead of Republican John McCain with 7,951 votes (28.6% vs. 46.1%) and other candidates with 246 votes (0.9% vs. 1.1%), among the 27,776 ballots cast by the township's 35,508 registered voters, for a turnout of 78.2% (vs. 78.7% in Somerset County). In the 2004 presidential election, Democrat John Kerry received 14,737 votes (64.2% vs. 47.2% countywide), ahead of Republican George W. Bush with 7,913 votes (34.5% vs. 51.5%) and other candidates with 211 votes (0.9% vs. 0.9%), among the 22,962 ballots cast by the township's 28,743 registered voters, for a turnout of 79.9% (vs. 81.7% in the whole county).

Gubernatorial election results for Franklin Township
Year	Republican		Democratic		Third party(ies)	
Year	No.	%	No.	%	No.	%
2025	6,345	24.51%	19,289	74.50%	258	1.00%
2021	5,792	29.71%	13,620	69.87%	82	0.42%
2017	4,950	29.97%	11,161	67.57%	406	2.46%
2013	8,178	52.33%	7,240	46.33%	209	1.34%
2009	6,842	39.03%	9,369	53.45%	1,317	7.51%
2005	5,728	36.74%	9,260	59.39%	604	3.87%

In the 2013 gubernatorial election, Republican Chris Christie received 51.7% of the vote (8,178 cast), ahead of Democrat Barbara Buono with 46.9% (7,420 votes), and other candidates with 1.3% (209 votes), among the 16,108 ballots cast by the township's 40,155 registered voters (301 ballots were spoiled), for a turnout of 40.1%. In the 2009 gubernatorial election, Democrat Jon Corzine received 9,369 ballots cast (53.0% vs. 34.1% countywide), ahead of Republican Chris Christie with 6,842 votes (38.7% vs. 55.8%), Independent Chris Daggett with 1,180 votes (6.7% vs. 8.7%) and other candidates with 137 votes (0.8% vs. 0.7%), among the 17,679 ballots cast by the township's 36,033 registered voters, yielding a 49.1% turnout (vs. 52.5% in the county).

United States Senate election results for Franklin Township1
Year	Republican		Democratic		Third party(ies)	
Year	No.	%	No.	%	No.	%
2024	8,789	27.94%	21,594	68.65%	1,074	3.41%
2018	6,789	27.77%	16,894	69.10%	764	3.13%
2012	7,252	27.63%	18,525	70.59%	466	1.78%
2006	5,127	34.46%	9,290	62.45%	460	3.09%

United States Senate election results for Franklin Township2
Year	Republican		Democratic		Third party(ies)	
Year	No.	%	No.	%	No.	%
2020	9,148	26.39%	24,927	71.91%	589	1.70%
2014	4,429	31.00%	9,626	67.39%	230	1.61%
2013	3,451	30.48%	7,762	68.56%	108	0.95%
2008	8,244	31.84%	17,030	65.77%	618	2.39%

== Education ==
The Franklin Township Public Schools serve students in pre-kindergarten through twelfth grade. As of the 2023–24 school year, the district, comprised of 10 schools, had an enrollment of 7,352 students and 684.8 classroom teachers (on an FTE basis), for a student–teacher ratio of 10.7:1. Schools in the district (with 2023–24 enrollment data from the National Center for Education Statistics) are Claremont Elementary School (666 students; in grades PreK–5), Conerly Road School (333; PreK–5), Elizabeth Avenue School (561; PreK–5), Franklin Park School (635; PreK–5), Hillcrest School (452; PreK–5), MacAfee Road School (420; PreK–5), Pine Grove Manor School (379; PreK–5), Franklin Middle School at Hamilton Street Campus (667; 6–8), Franklin Middle School at Sampson G. Smith Campus (714; 6–8) and Franklin High School (2,200; 9–12).

Central Jersey College Prep Charter School is a comprehensive public charter middle school / high school serving students in grades 6–12 that aims to prepare all graduates for admission to a four-year university. In 2016, the school was one of ten schools in New Jersey, and the only charter school, recognized as a National Blue Ribbon School by the United States Department of Education. As of the 2018–2019 school year, the high school had an enrollment of 820 students and 73.4 classroom teachers (on an FTE basis), for a student–teacher ratio of 11.2:1.

Rutgers Preparatory School, a private day school founded in 1766, is located in Franklin Township and occupies a 35-acre campus between Easton Avenue and the Raritan River. The state's oldest independent school, RPS moved to Franklin Township in 1957.

Saint Matthias School is a parochial elementary school founded in 1962 that serves students in preschool through eighth grade and operates under the supervision of the Roman Catholic Diocese of Metuchen.

Cedar Hill Preparatory School, a Pre-K–8 school founded in 2003 as Oakcrest Academy, was one of eight private schools recognized in 2017 by the National Blue Ribbon Schools Program as an Exemplary High Performing School by the United States Department of Education.

== Historic district ==
The Kingston Mill Historic District is a 49-acre (20 ha) historic district encompassing the community of Kingston, New Jersey (which is bounded by Franklin Township in Somerset County, Princeton in Mercer County, and South Brunswick in Middlesex County). In 1683, Henry Greenland built the first tavern here for travelers between New York City and Philadelphia. The current Kingston Mill, also known as the Kingston Gristmill, was built in 1888, the third one at this site. In 1755, Jacob Skilman built a gristmill and sawmill here on the Millstone River, located along the historic King's Highway. It was added to the National Register of Historic Places on April 10, 1986 for its significance in engineering, exploration/settlement, industry, and transportation. The district includes 16 contributing buildings and 2 contributing structures.

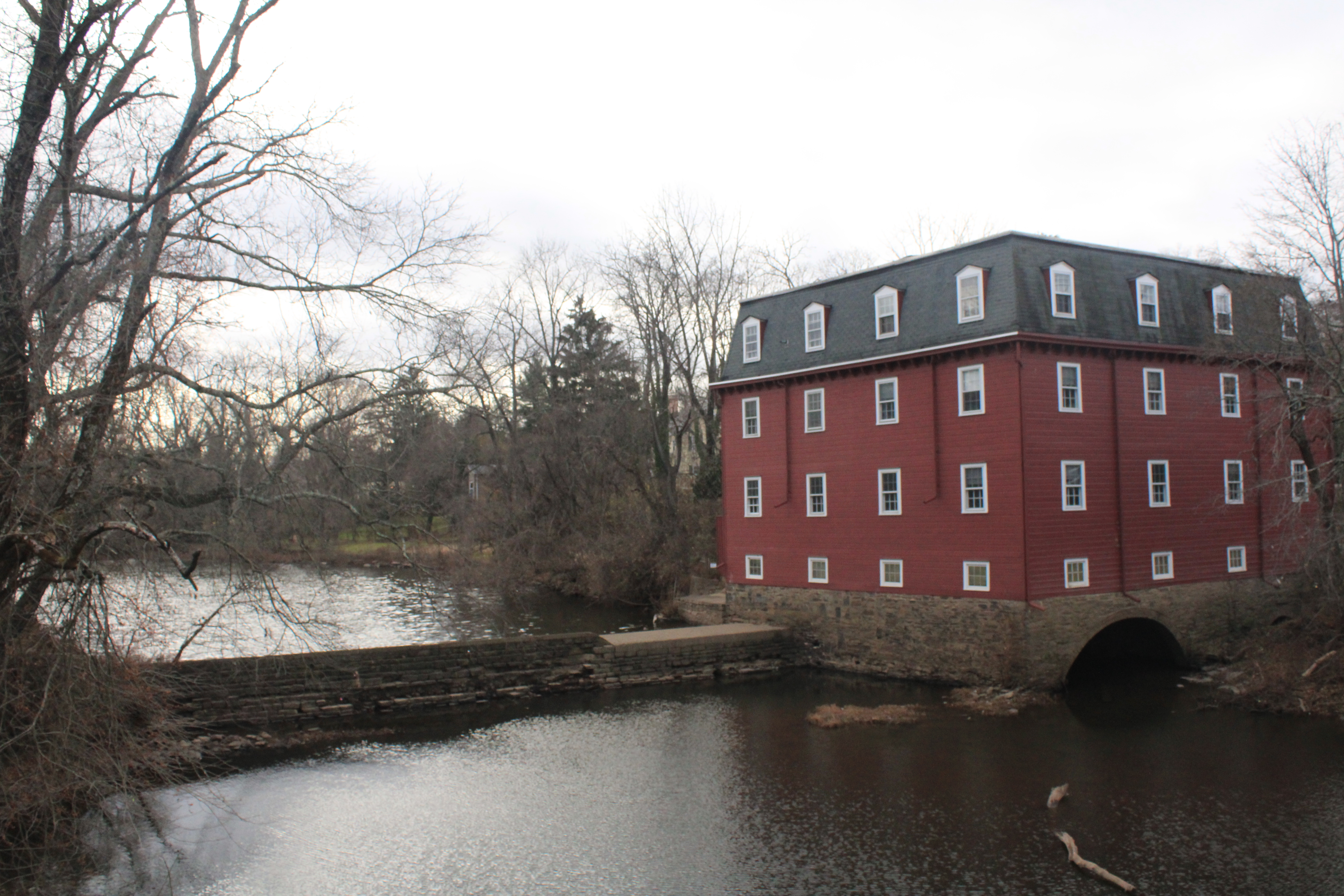
Kingston Mill on the Millstone River

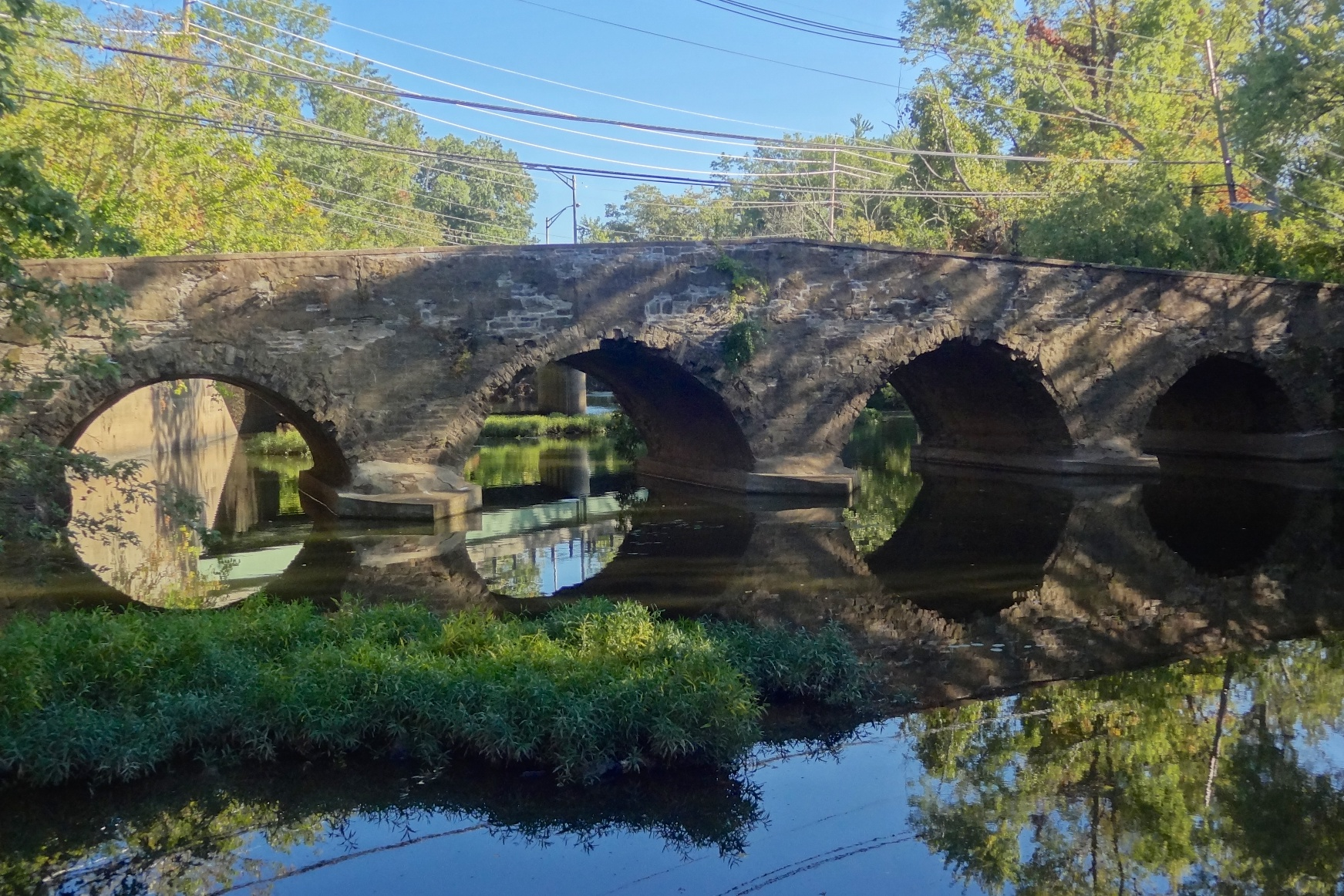
The Kingston Bridge (1798), built to replace one demolished by George Washington's troops to prevent British pursuit

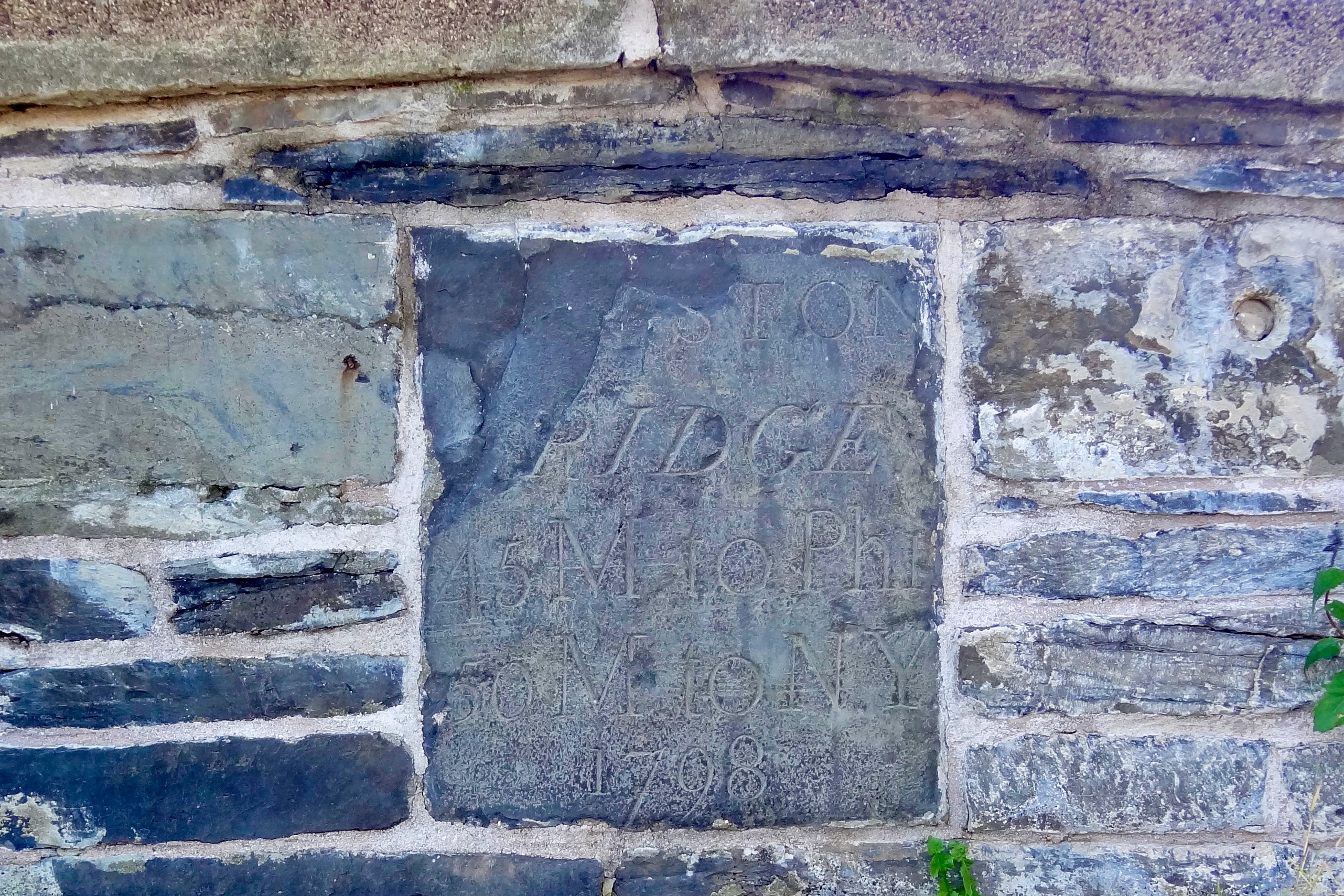
The mile marker from 1798, showing the distance to Philadelphia (45 miles) and New York City (50 miles)

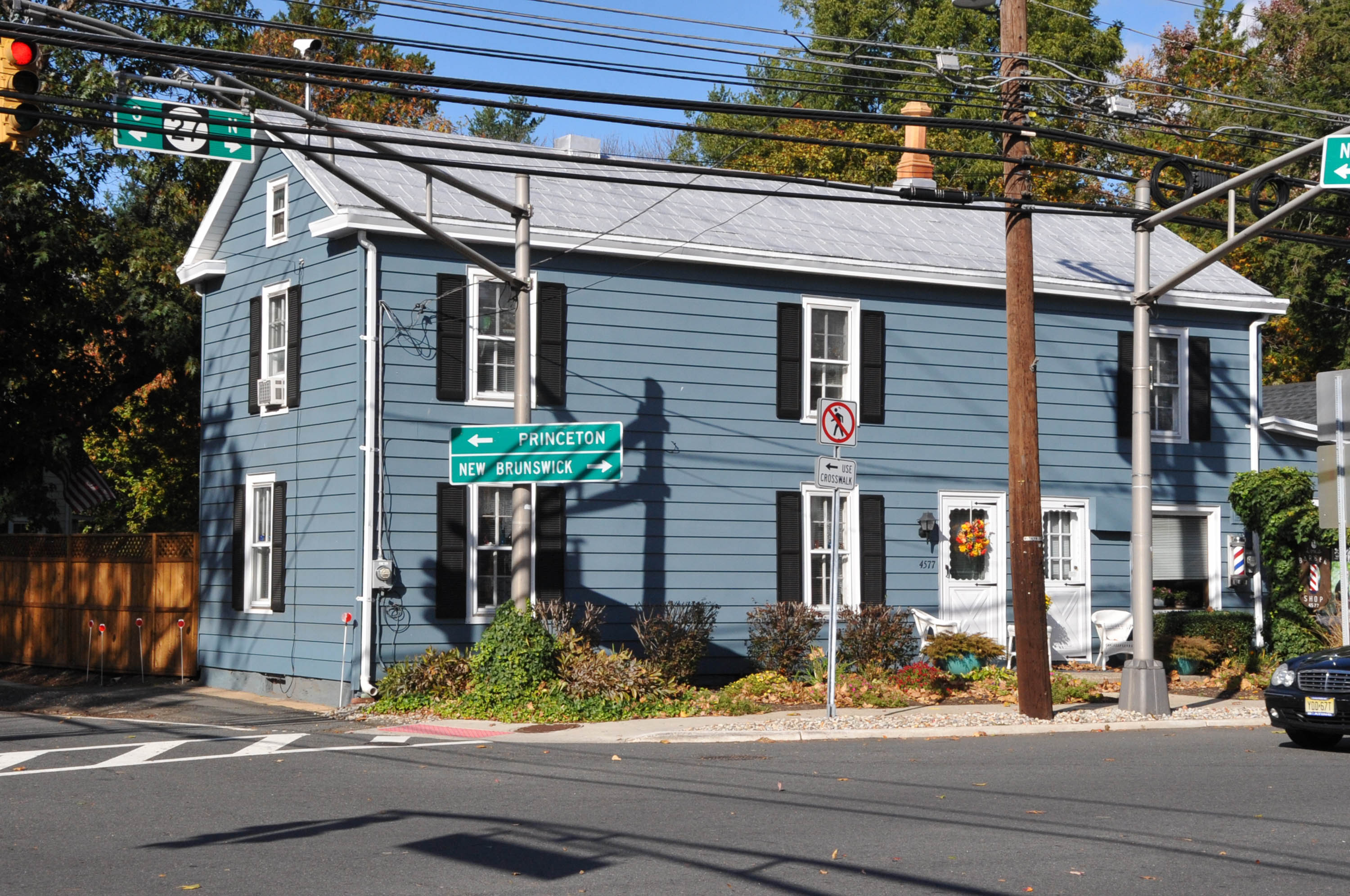
Colonial on King's Highway

== Infrastructure ==
=== Emergency services ===
Fire companies

Franklin Township is served by 10 all-volunteer Fire Departments in four fire districts.

- Community Fire Company / Station 25 (District 3)
- Elizabeth Ave. Fire Company / Station 26 (District 1)
- East Franklin Fire Department / Station 27 (District 3)
- Middlebush Fire Department / Station 44 (District 1)
- Millstone Valley Fire Company / Station 28 (District 1)
- Franklin Park Volunteer Fire Company / Station 31 (District 2)
- Griggstown Volunteer Fire Company / Station 35 (District 2)
- Rocky Hill Fire Department / Station 53 (District 4) As of April 1, 2025
- Little Rocky Hill Volunteer Fire Company / Station 41 (District 2)
- Somerset Fire & Rescue Company #1 / Station 56 (District 1)

First aid squads

Franklin Township is served by four volunteer First Aid and Rescue Squads and one hospital-based EMS provider

- East Millstone First Aid Squad / Station 52
- Franklin Somerset First Aid Squad / Station 71 (Permanently closed)
- Rocky Hill First Aid & Rescue Squad / Station 53
- Kendall Park First Aid & Rescue Squad
- Kingston First Aid & Rescue Squad / Station 72
- Robert Wood Johnson EMS (Paid EMS through Municipal Contract)

=== Transportation ===
==== Roads and highways ====
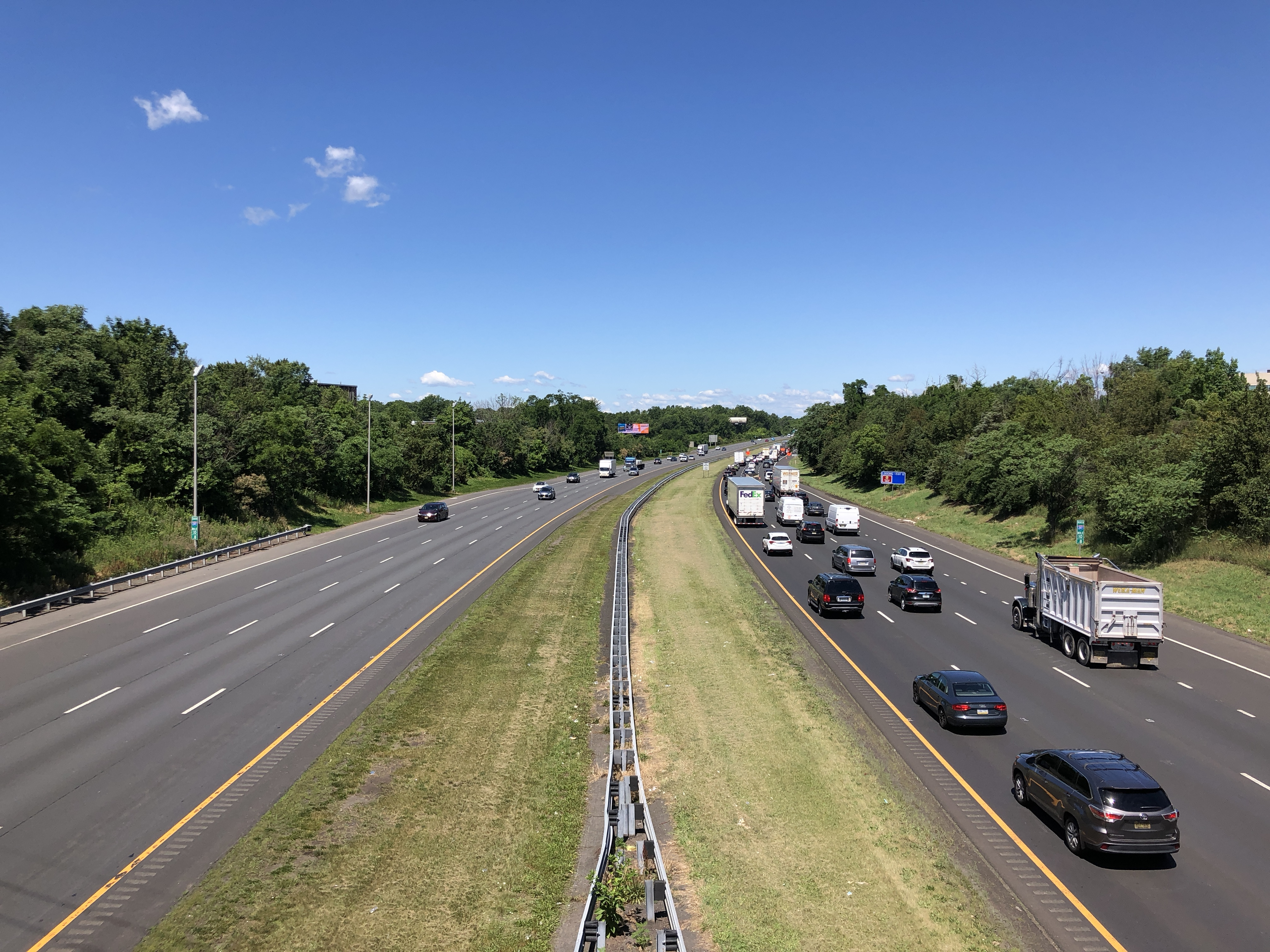
Interstate 287 northbound in Franklin Township

As of May 2010, the township had a total of 260.12 miles (418.62 km) of roadways, of which 216.72 miles (348.78 km) were maintained by the municipality, 34.67 miles (55.80 km) by Somerset County and 8.73 miles (14.05 km) by the New Jersey Department of Transportation.

Interstate 287 is the most significant highway within the township. It runs through the northern part of the township with two interchanges. Route 27 runs along the border between New Brunswick, and the townships of South Brunswick and North Brunswick. Some of the major county routes that are in the township are CR 514, CR 518 and CR 527.

The New Jersey Turnpike (Interstate 95) passes outside the township in both neighboring South Brunswick and New Brunswick, but the closest interchanges are two towns away in Edison (Exit 10), East Brunswick Township (Exit 9) and Monroe Township (Exit 8A).

Franklin Township was to house the northern end of the Somerset Freeway at I-287 back in 1964 until it was later proposed to end in Piscataway. An additional spur, Interstate 695, was also proposed as part of the project. This road was to complete Interstate 95 at the proposed southern end in Hopewell Township at I-95 and I-295. However the entire project was ultimately cancelled in 1982.

==== Public transportation ====
Somerset County offers DASH routes 851 and 852, providing service to Franklin Township from Bound Brook, New Brunswick and North Brunswick. Additionally, the CAT 1R provides service to Raritan Valley Community College, passing through Bound Brook, Somerville, and Raritan.

Commuter bus service to Midtown Manhattan is offered by commuter transportation company OurBus, during peak hours, with service at Kendall Park to and from New York City.

=== Utilities ===
Gas and electricity are provided by PSE&G. Water comes from the Delaware and Raritan Canal from water bought from American Water and neighboring North Brunswick and New Brunswick in Middlesex County. In 2011, the township considered privatizing the system and awarding the contract to United Water. Sewerage service is provided by the Township of Franklin Sewerage Authority.

== Points of interest ==
- The Blackwells Mills Canal House, located at Blackwells Mills Road and Canal Road (598 Canal Road, Somerset) on the Delaware and Raritan Canal, was built c. 1830s, at the same time as the canal. It was constructed to house the bridge tender, who would open the swing bridge when canal boats came through, then close it to allow traffic to cross over the canal. The building is leased from the State and is maintained and operated by the Blackwells Mills Canal House Association in conjunction with the Meadows Foundation.
- The Franklin Inn, at 2371 Amwell Road (Route 514), East Millstone, NJ a farmhouse built c. 1752 by Cornelius Van Liew, it has also been known as Annie Van Liew's House and, after being remodeled into a tavern and inn, the Franklin House Hotel.
- The Hageman Farm, at 209 South Middlebush Road, is a c. 1861 historic farm. Owned by Franklin Township, the farm is under the stewardship of the Meadows Foundation.
- Rockingham State Historic Site, near Kingston on CR 603 (Somerset County), adjacent to the Delaware and Raritan Canal. George Washington wrote his Farewell Address to the Revolutionary Army while staying here in the fall of 1783.
- Spieden & Hoebel Farms, Little Valley Natural Area is a 120-acre (0.49 km^{2}) area at 1327 and 1345 Canal Road with several miles of trails through forest and along field edges. Across Canal Road is access to the Delaware and Raritan Canal tow path and the Millstone River and flood plain.
- Tulipwood, at 1165 Hamilton Street, is a c. 1892 designed by J. August Lienau, the son of Detlef Lienau for his brother-in-law Stephen Guion Williams whose family owned the Williams & Guion Black Star Line. The home is owned by Franklin Township.
- The Ukrainian Cultural Center at 135 Davidson Avenue, serves as the headquarters of the Ukrainian Orthodox Church of the USA and includes the following at the site (some open by appointment only):
  - St. Sophia Seminary and Library, founded in 1975
  - St. Andrew Memorial Church, completed and consecrated in 1967 in memory of the 7-14 million people who died in the Ukrainian famine of 1932-33 is a unique example of Ukrainian Cossack Baroque architecture in the area
  - St. Andrew Cemetery, founded in 1952
  - The Ukrainian Historical and Educational Center, founded in 1972, which contains treasures of Ukrainian cultural, historical, social, religious, literary and political life including Easter eggs, lacework, hand embroidery, statuary and church vessels.
  - The Ukrainian Cultural Center, dedicated in 1985
  - St. Andrew Ukrainian School, founded in 1962 and located in the Cultural Center
  - St. Andrew Bookstore and Ecclesiastical Supply, founded in 1992
- The historic Fisher Homestead, built in 1688, the home of Hendrick Fisher, New Jersey's delegate to the Continental Congress, and the site of the Fisher Family Cemetery.
- The Van Liew-Suydam House, at 280 South Middlebush Road, was built in the 18th century by Peter Van Liew. Joseph Suydam later built the part of the house that is visible today. The newest and largest portion of the house was built in 1875. Although the most recent long term owner of the house was named French, the house has been named after its two initial owners. Owned by Franklin Township, the farm is under the stewardship of the Meadows Foundation. In October of 2019, Apple TV filmed the miniseries Lisey's Story at the Van Liew-Suydam House, based off of Stephen King's psychological horror novel.
- The Van Wickle House, at 1289 Easton Avenue is a historic house built c. 1722 by Symen Van Wickle. Operated by the Meadows Foundation which holds special annual events here.
- The Wyckoff-Garretson House, at 215 South Middlebush Road, was built in 1730 by Cornelius Wyckoff. The house was restored by the Meadows Foundation under the direction of architect Mark Alan Hewitt.

== Notable people ==
People who were born in, residents of, or otherwise closely associated with Franklin Township include:

- Carlton Agudosi (born 1994), wide receiver for the Arizona Cardinals of the NFL
- Anthony Bartholomay (1919–1975), mathematician who introduced molecular set theory
- Avery Brooks (born 1948), actor who portrayed Captain Sisko in Star Trek: Deep Space Nine, Hawk on Spenser: For Hire and A Man Called Hawk, as well as film and theatre
- Clifford P. Case (1904–1982), politician who served in the United States House of Representatives and the United States Senate
- Upendra J. Chivukula (born 1950), New Jersey Board of Public Utilities commissioner who represented the 17th Legislative District in the New Jersey General Assembly, and had served on the Franklin Township Council since 1997, serving as its mayor in 2000 and its deputy mayor in 1998
- Joseph Danielsen, member of the New Jersey General Assembly representing the 17th Legislative District since October 2014, after being appointed to fill the vacant seat of Upendra J. Chivukula
- Charles Leavitt Edgar (1860–1932), mechanical engineer working in the area of central power stations noted for several firsts, president of Boston Edison (1900) and National Electric Light Association
- Margit Feldman (1929–2020), public speaker, educator, activist and Holocaust survivor
- Hendrick Fisher (1697–1778), represented Somerset County in the New Jersey Colonial Assembly, was one of three delegates representing New Jersey at the First Colonial Congress ("The Stamp Act Congress") in New York in 1765, was elected to New Jersey's Committee of Correspondence, served as a member of the Committee of Safety, was President of the Colonial Assembly, was the first president of the Provincial Congress of New Jersey in 1775, was labeled an arch traitor and "Enemy of the Crown", and a founder and first president of the board of trustees of Queen's College (now Rutgers University). His homestead and grave are currently located on the grounds of the Ukrainian Cultural Center on Easton Avenue west of Davidson Avenue in the Somerset section
- Krystyna Freda (born 1993), footballer who plays as a forward for Cypriot First Division club Apollon Ladies FC
- Theodore Frelinghuysen (1787–1862), politician who served as New Jersey Attorney General, United States Senator, and Mayor of Newark, New Jersey before running as a candidate for Vice President with Henry Clay on the Whig ticket in the election of 1844
- Colonel Routh Goshen (1837–1889), billed as the tallest man in the world at 7 feet 11 inches (2.41 m) and 620 pounds (280 kg), he was known as the Middlebush Giant, a stage name created by P. T. Barnum
- Mary Griffith (1772–1846), writer, horticulturist and scientist
- Benjamin Griggs (1690–1768), one of the earliest European settlers of the area that would later be known as Griggstown, a community that takes its name from the grist mill that Griggs established on the Millstone River
- Jean-Guillaume, baron Hyde de Neuville (1776–1857), French aristocrat, diplomat, and politician who resided in Franklin Township between 1811 and 1814 on a 100-acre (0.40 km^{2}) farm on Easton Avenue in the area of the current Neuville Drive
- Roy Hinson (born 1961), Rutgers University stand-out who was a 1st round pick in the 1983 NBA draft and played eight seasons with the Cleveland Cavaliers, Philadelphia 76ers and New Jersey Nets
- John Honeyman (1729–1822), purported spy for George Washington who was primarily responsible for gathering the intelligence crucial to Washington's victory in the Battle of Trenton
- Daryle Lamont Jenkins (born 1968), political activist, best known for founding One People's Project
- Leeroy Wilfred Kabs-Kanu (born 1954), Sierra Leonean-American reverend, journalist and newspaper publisher who served as Minister Plenipotentiary at the Permanent Mission of Sierra Leone to the United Nations
- Joshua Kuroda-Grauer (born 2003), professional baseball infielder for the Athletics
- Roy E. LaGrone (1922–1993), art director and illustrator, who was a member of the Tuskegee Airmen
- Matthew Leydt (1755–1853), the first graduate of Queen's College (now Rutgers College of Rutgers University)
- Christopher Massimine, former CEO of the National Yiddish Theatre Folksbiene
- Judy Melick (born 1954), former competition swimmer who participated as part of the U.S. team at the 1972 Summer Olympics
- Diamond Miller (born 2001), college basketball player for the Maryland Terrapins women's basketball team
- Maleah Joi Moon (born 2003), Tony Award-winning actress best known for originating the role of Ali in the Alicia Keys semi-autographical Broadway musical, Hell's Kitchen
- Paul Muldoon (born 1951), writer, academic and educator, as well as Pulitzer Prize-winning poet originally from County Armagh, Northern Ireland
- Jeanette Mundt (born 1982), painter, best known for her works in the 2019 Whitney Biennial
- Peter Davis Oakey (1861–1920), politician who served in the United States House of Representatives 1915–1917
- Michael James Pappas (born 1960), former U.S. Congressman known for securing the release of the battleship USS New Jersey to the state of New Jersey as a museum, and his infamous singing of "Twinkle, Twinkle, Kenneth Starr" on the House floor, former mayor of Franklin Township
- Randal Pinkett (born 1971), winner of The Apprentice 4, entrepreneur, speaker, author, scholar and community servant. Co-founder, president and CEO of BCT Partners, a Rutgers University Rhodes Scholar with four advanced degrees from University of Oxford and M.I.T.
- Jeff Porter (born 1985), track and field athlete who competed for the United States in the 110-meter hurdles at the 2012 Summer Olympics and the 2016 Summer Olympics
- Joe Porter (born 1985), cornerback who played in the NFL for the Green Bay Packers, Cleveland Browns and Oakland Raiders
- Ferdinand Schureman Schenck (1790–1860), politician who represented New Jersey in the United States House of Representatives from 1833 to 1837
- Breein Tyree (born 1998), point guard / shooting guard for the Ole Miss Rebels men's basketball team
- Charlie Weis (born 1956), former head coach of the University of Notre Dame Fighting Irish football team, former offensive coordinator for New England Patriots during Super Bowl XXXVI, XXXVIII, and XXXIX, football coach for Franklin High School during its 1989 state championship season
- Helen Westley (1875–1942), movie actress popular in the 1930s and 1940s, starring in such films as The Age of Innocence, Anne of Green Gables, and Rebecca of Sunnybrook Farm
- Alma Bridwell White (1862–1946), founder of the Pillar of Fire Church and Zarephath community, first woman consecrated a bishop in the United States
- Arlene White Lawrence (1916–1990), Bishop and the third President and General Superintendent of the Pillar of Fire Church
- Frances White (born 1960), composer and 2004 Guggenheim Fellow, who composes for the Japanese flute instrument shakuhachi
- Bruce Williams (1932–2019), radio talk show host; currently the longest running talk show in history. Member of Radio Hall of Fame, former mayor of Franklin Township from 1967 to 1975
- Earl Williams (1948–2013), MLB catcher for eight seasons who earned the National League's Rookie of the Year Award at that position in 1971
