= East Franklin, New Jersey =

Populated place in Somerset County, New Jersey, US

- Census-designated place
- Location of East Franklin CDP within Somerset County. Inset: Location of Somerset County in New Jersey. East Franklin, New Jersey (New Jersey) East Franklin, New Jersey (the United States)
- Coordinates: 40.492887°N 74.471123°W
- Country: United States
- State: New Jersey
- County: Somerset
- Township: Franklin

Area
  - Total: 1.09 sq mi (2.82 km^{2})
  - Land: 1.09 sq mi (2.82 km^{2})
  - Water: 0 sq mi (0.00 km^{2}) 0.15%
- Elevation: 115 ft (35 m)

Population (2020)
  - Total: 9,788
  - Density: 8,988.2/sq mi (3,470.37/km^{2})
- Time zone: UTC−05:00 (Eastern (EST))
  - Summer (DST): UTC−04:00 (Eastern (EDT))
- Area codes: 609 and 732/848
- FIPS code: 34-13990
- GNIS feature ID: 02583980

East Franklin is an unincorporated community and census-designated place (CDP) located in Franklin Township, in Somerset County, in the U.S. state of New Jersey. As of the 2020 census, East Franklin had a population of 9,788.

== Geography ==
According to the United States Census Bureau, East Franklin had a total area of 1.088 square miles (2.82 km^{2}), including 1.086 square miles (2.81 km^{2}) of land and 0.002 square miles (0.0052 km^{2}) of water (0.15%).

== Demographics ==
Historical population
Census	Pop.	Note	%±
2010	8,669		—
2020	9,788		12.9%
Population sources: 2010 2020

East Franklin first appeared as a census designated place in the 2010 U.S. census formed from part of the Somerset CDP and additional area.

=== Racial and ethnic composition ===
East Franklin CDP, New Jersey – Racial and ethnic composition Note: the US Census treats Hispanic/Latino as an ethnic category. This table excludes Latinos from the racial categories and assigns them to a separate category. Hispanics/Latinos may be of any race.
Race / Ethnicity (NH = Non-Hispanic)	Pop 2010	Pop 2020	% 2010	% 2020
White alone (NH)	1,209	1,036	13.95%	10.58%
Black or African American alone (NH)	3,166	3,030	36.52%	30.96%
Native American or Alaska Native alone (NH)	35	12	0.40%	0.12%
Asian alone (NH)	446	685	5.14%	7.00%
Native Hawaiian or Pacific Islander alone (NH)	3	2	0.03%	0.02%
Other race alone (NH)	53	113	0.61%	1.15%
Mixed race or Multiracial (NH)	192	252	2.21%	2.57%
Hispanic or Latino (any race)	3,565	4,658	41.12%	47.59%
Total	8,669	9,788	100.00%	100.00%

=== 2020 census ===
As of the 2020 census, East Franklin had 9,788 people. The median age was 32.7 years. Of residents, 24.8% were under age 18 and 10.3% were age 65 or older. For every 100 females, there were 98.8 males, and for every 100 females age 18 and over, there were 96.7 males.

100.0% of residents lived in urban areas, and 0.0% lived in rural areas.

There were 2,970 households, and 40.7% had children under age 18 living in them. Of all households, 40.8% were married-couple households, 19.1% were households with a male householder and no spouse or partner present, and 32.1% were households with a female householder and no spouse or partner present. About 21.0% of all households were made up of individuals, and 7.9% had someone living alone who was age 65 or older.

There were 3,170 housing units, of which 6.3% were vacant. The homeowner vacancy rate was 1.2%, and the rental vacancy rate was 6.3%.

=== 2010 census ===
The 2010 United States census counted 8,669 people, 2,488 households, and 1,864 families in the CDP. The population density was 7,983.3 per square mile (3,082.4/km^{2}). There were 2,646 housing units at an average density of 2,436.7 per square mile (940.8/km^{2}). The racial makeup was 29.46% (2,554) White, 38.98% (3,379) Black or African American, 0.66% (57) Native American, 5.23% (453) Asian, 0.03% (3) Pacific Islander, 20.66% (1,791) from other races, and 4.98% (432) from two or more races. Hispanic or Latino of any race were 41.12% (3,565) of the population.

Of the 2,488 households, 38.8% had children under the age of 18; 43.4% were married couples living together; 23.0% had a female householder with no husband present and 25.1% were non-families. Of all households, 18.7% were made up of individuals and 6.9% had someone living alone who was 65 years of age or older. The average household size was 3.48 and the average family size was 3.89.

28.4% of the population were under the age of 18, 12.0% from 18 to 24, 29.6% from 25 to 44, 21.2% from 45 to 64, and 8.9% who were 65 years of age or older. The median age was 31.3 years. For every 100 females, the population had 95.3 males. For every 100 females ages 18 and older there were 94.4 males.
