= Wellsoft =

Wellsoft Corporation
- Company type: Private
- Industry: Electronic Medical Records
- Founded: 1988
- Headquarters: Somerset, NJ, USA
- Key people: John Santmann, CEO
- Products: Wellsoft EDIS v11

Wellsoft Corporation is an Electronic Medical Record software vendor specializing in Emergency Department Information Systems (EDIS).

Wellsoft EDIS v11 is certified as an ONC-ACB 2014 Edition EHR Module (CC-2014-527400-1). This certification does not represent an endorsement by the U.S. Department of Health and Human Services or guarantee the receipt of incentive payments. The system complies with The Joint Commission and CMS requirements.
