= Voorhees (CDP), New Jersey =

Populated place in Somerset County, New Jersey, US

Voorhees, New Jersey
- Census-designated place
- Location in Somerset County Location in New Jersey Location in the United States
- Coordinates: 40.482176°N 74.492506°W
- Country: United States
- State: New Jersey
- County: Somerset
- Township: Franklin

Area
  - Total: 0.72 sq mi (1.86 km^{2})
  - Land: 0.72 sq mi (1.86 km^{2})
  - Water: 0 sq mi (0.00 km^{2}) 0.00%
- Elevation: 125 ft (38 m)

Population (2020)
  - Total: 1,517
  - Density: 2,112.7/sq mi (815.73/km^{2})
- Time zone: UTC−05:00 (Eastern (EST))
  - Summer (DST): UTC−04:00 (Eastern (EDT))
- Area codes: 609/640 and 732/848
- FIPS code: 34-76250
- GNIS feature ID: 02584039

Voorhees is an unincorporated community and census-designated place (CDP) located in Franklin Township, in Somerset County, in the U.S. state of New Jersey. As of the 2010 United States census, the CDP's population was 1,959.

== Geography ==
According to the United States Census Bureau, Voorhees had a total area of 0.718 square miles (1.860 km^{2}), all of which was land.

== Demographics ==
Historical population
Census	Pop.	Note	%±
2010	976		—
2020	1,517		55.4%
Population sources: 2010

Voorhees first appeared as a census designated place in the 2010 U.S. census formed from part of the Somerset CDP and additional area.

=== 2020 census ===
Voorhees CDP, New Jersey – Racial and ethnic composition Note: the US Census treats Hispanic/Latino as an ethnic category. This table excludes Latinos from the racial categories and assigns them to a separate category. Hispanics/Latinos may be of any race.
Race / Ethnicity (NH = Non-Hispanic)	Pop 2010	Pop 2020	% 2010	% 2020
White alone (NH)	72	110	7.38%	7.25%
Black or African American alone (NH)	582	605	59.63%	39.88%
Native American or Alaska Native alone (NH)	0	3	0.00%	0.20%
Asian alone (NH)	58	116	5.94%	7.65%
Native Hawaiian or Pacific Islander alone (NH)	0	0	0.00%	0.00%
Other race alone (NH)	5	12	0.51%	0.79%
Mixed race or Multiracial (NH)	25	24	2.56%	1.58%
Hispanic or Latino (any race)	234	647	23.98%	42.65%
Total	976	1,517	100.00%	100.00%

=== 2010 census ===
The 2010 United States census counted 976 people, 301 households, and 248 families in the CDP. The population density was 1,359.2 per square mile (524.8/km^{2}). There were 317 housing units at an average density of 441.5 per square mile (170.5/km^{2}). The racial makeup was 16.80% (164) White, 62.91% (614) Black or African American, 1.43% (14) Native American, 5.94% (58) Asian, 0.00% (0) Pacific Islander, 8.71% (85) from other races, and 4.20% (41) from two or more races. Hispanic or Latino of any race were 23.98% (234) of the population.

Of the 301 households, 43.9% had children under the age of 18; 41.5% were married couples living together; 32.2% had a female householder with no husband present and 17.6% were non-families. Of all households, 13.3% were made up of individuals and 4.3% had someone living alone who was 65 years of age or older. The average household size was 3.24 and the average family size was 3.53.

32.8% of the population were under the age of 18, 8.7% from 18 to 24, 28.1% from 25 to 44, 21.9% from 45 to 64, and 8.5% who were 65 years of age or older. The median age was 31.3 years. For every 100 females, the population had 80.1 males. For every 100 females ages 18 and older there were 75.4 males.
