= Franklin Township Public Library =

Franklin Township Free Public Library
- 40.4979°N 74.5253°W
- Location: Franklin Township, Somerset County, New Jersey, USA
- Branches: 3

Collection
- Size: 198,340 [2022]

Access and use
- Circulation: 280,072 [2022]
- Population served: 65,642
- Members: 31,986

Other information
- Budget: $4,319,314 [2022]
- Employees: 64
- Website: www.franklintwp.org

The Franklin Township Public Library (FTPL) is a public library system in Franklin Township, Somerset County, New Jersey. The library offers numerous programs and events to its diverse population. With three different locations, the Franklin Township Public Library is the public library system for the township of Franklin, Somerset County, New Jersey, United States.

== Locations ==
The Demott Lane Branch, located in the Somerset section of Franklin, is considered the 'Main Library'. It is located at 485 DeMott Lane; Somerset, NJ within the Franklin Township Municipal Complex. A satellite branch called the Franklin Park Library or South Branch is located 64 Clover Place; Franklin Park, NJ next to the Franklin Park Elementary School. A third branch library is located at 427 Lewis Street; Somerset, NJ within the Franklin Township Youth Center. The Youth Center Library has a separate entrance off of the lobby and is opened to patrons of all ages.

== Library departments ==
- Adult Services: The functions of the Adult Services department are to develop and maintain an appropriate materials collection for adults; to provide readers’ advisory, reference and information services; to provide public programs; and to engage organizations and individuals in the community and build partnerships to meet community goals.
- Youth Services: Children and teens shall have full access to the total resources of the library and its programs. While service is similar to that for adults, special collections of materials suitable for use by children, teens, caregivers and educators are selected, maintained and interpreted by staff trained in this specialized work and in programming for these age groups.
- Circulation services: This provide efficient service for customers through the charging and discharging of materials, assisting customers with their library card accounts, coordinating inter-branch and external circulation of library materials, and returning library materials to the shelves. This department is often the initial contact with library users and staff are often responsible for interpreting many of our policies and procedures.
- Technical services: This department will be responsible for the ordering and processing of library materials and for maintaining the budgetary records of the library’s materials collection. This will include directing and coordinating all functions related to the purchasing and processing of library materials for the system. This department also maintains all items in the collection, repairing or replacing as needed.

== Architecture ==
Franklin Township Public Library is a contemporary design which hugs the farmland with stocky brick columns and overhangs and then soars at the center into a vaulted atrium laced with cables, brackets and open web steel joists. The interior is a metaphor for intellectual flight and everything about it is uplifting including the amount of natural light that streams into the interior. Visitors are immediately impressed with the brightness of the interior and design which pulls patrons in and then rewards them with choices; choice of terrain (multi-leveled children’s' room), choice of location (several glass enclosed quiet study and meeting rooms), and choice of views (a stepped exterior which increases the amount of window wall and outside vistas).

== Administration ==
- January Adams, Director of Library
- Lana Savron-Abbott, Head of Youth Services
- Michael Ferrante, Head of Adult Services
- Megan Ignegno, Head of Circulation Services

== Board of trustees ==
As of August 2023:

- Nicholas Ciampa, President
- Nabil B. Choueiri, Vice President & Treasurer
- Iris Kislin, Secretary
- Agnes Kulu-Banya
- Kevin McNeil
- Dr. Amy Arsiwala, Superintendent of Schools
- Phillip Kramer, Mayor of Franklin Township
- Tianna Gresham, Mayor's Alternate

== Special programs ==
The library has multiple programs regularly scheduled through the month for Adult, Teen and Youth (Children). Their web site has calendars with all events listed and is updated regularly.

- Kindle Loans: The library loans out Kindle devices that come with chargers for a 3 week period. Each Kindle contains almost 200 different books and you can request books to be added to the Kindle devices.
- Museum Passes: Free passes to area museums and attractions are available to patrons.
