= Van Wickle House =

Historic house in New Jersey, United States

- The Meadows
- U.S. National Register of Historic Places
- New Jersey Register of Historic Places
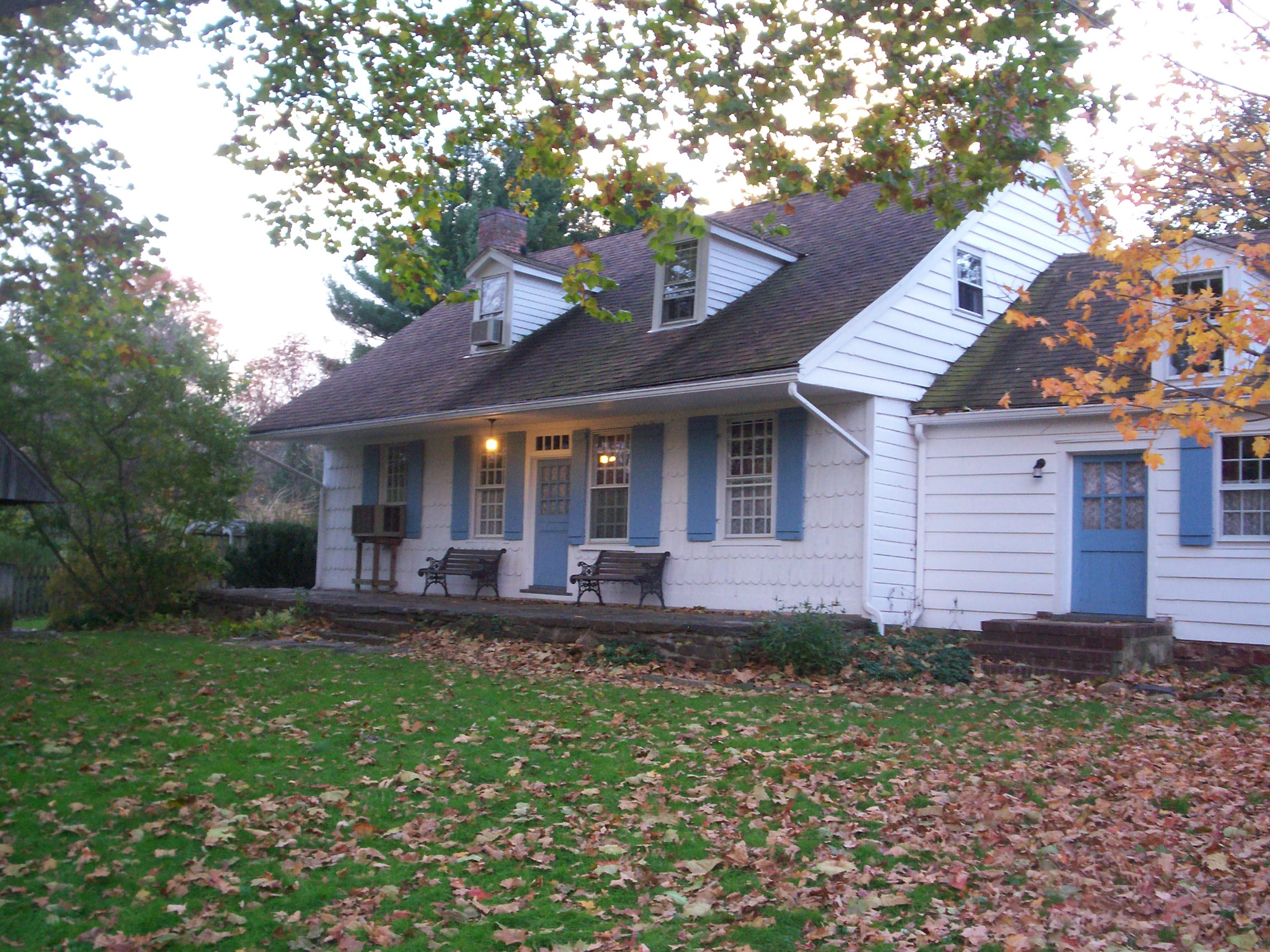
- Van Wickle House in 2006

- Location within Somerset County, New Jersey Location within New Jersey Location within the United States
- Location: 1289 Easton Avenue, Franklin Township, Somerset County, New Jersey
- Coordinates: 40.522887°N 74.492728°W
- Area: 5.8 acres (2.3 ha)
- Built: 1722
- NRHP reference No.: 73001134
- NJRHP No.: 2504

Significant dates
- Added to NRHP: December 4, 1973
- Designated NJRHP: September 18, 1973

The Van Wickle House, also known as the Symen Van Wickle House, is a historical house located at 1289 Easton Avenue in the Somerset section of Franklin Township, Somerset County, New Jersey, United States. It was built in 1722 by Symen Van Wickle, also known as Symen Van Wicklin. The house, historically known as The Meadows, was added to the National Register of Historic Places on December 4, 1973.

== Evert Van Wickle ==
Evert Van Wickle was a carpenter from the Netherlands who emigrated to New Amersfoort, which is now Flatlands, Brooklyn, and married Elizabeth Van Liew. Around 1700, Evert purchased almost 800 acres (320 ha) of land on the Raritan River in Somerset. Evert had a son: Symen Van Wickle (c1700-1754) who married Geradina Couwenhoven (1705-?).

== Symen Van Wickle ==
Symen built his home facing the Raritan River in 1722. The location was called the "upper fording place". Behind the house was the link between Middlebush, New Jersey and Raritan Landing, New Jersey called "Old Middlebush Road" (now DeMott Lane in Somerset). Evert and Geradina had the following children: Elsje Van Wickle (c1723-?); Evert Van Wickle (c. 1726-?); Nicholas Van Wickle (c. 1728-?); Mattje Van Wickle (c. 1730-?); Seytje Van Wicklin (1732-?); Anne Van Wickle (c. 1734-?); Dinah Van Wickle (1734-?); and Mary Van Wickle (c.1738-?).

== Delaware and Raritan Canal ==
Around 1835, the Delaware and Raritan Canal was built between the Raritan River and the Van Wickle House.

== Preservation ==
In 1976 the house was put up for sale and was eyed by developers until a grassroots group of concerned citizens organized to protect the historic house. "The Meadows" was a name long associated with the house so this group took the name Meadows Foundation for the name of their organization. Through fundraising and a Green Acres grant they were able to acquire and preserve the house. The Meadows Foundation runs programming at the Van Wickle house such as their Candlelight Concert and Fireside Chats series as well as seasonal celebrations such as Sinterklaas (Dutch Santa) Festival and, in cooperation the Franklin Township Parks and Recreation Department, programs such as the Pumpkin Patch Halloween Celebration and the Bunny Jamboree. Nominal donations accepted at events help with maintenance and restoration costs.

== Temporary closure ==
In late October 2014 the Meadows Foundation closed the Van Wickle House to the public, citing structural damage from flooding that had occurred during Hurricane Irene and Hurricane Sandy. The organization added that it was "working diligently with county, state and federal agencies to save this historic structure with a complete restoration." The grounds surrounding the house remain open to the public.

== See also ==
- List of the oldest buildings in New Jersey
