= Central Jersey College Prep Charter School =

Charter/State school in Somerset County, New Jersey, US

Location
- 101 Mettlers Road; Franklin Township, Somerset County, New Jersey 08873; United States
- 40.528878°N 74.551139°W

Information
- Type: Charter school
- Motto: To Begin Lifetime Enjoyment of Learning
- Established: 2006
- NCES School ID: 340009000829
- Chief Education Officer: Namik Sercan
- Faculty: 116.7 FTEs
- Grades: K-12
- Enrollment: 1,396 (as of 2024–25)
- Student to teacher ratio: 12.0:1
- Team name: Cougars
- Website: www.cjcollegeprep.org

Central Jersey College Prep Charter School is a comprehensive public charter elementary / middle / high school that serves students in kindergarten through twelfth grade, located in the Somerset section of Franklin Township, in Somerset County, in the U.S. state of New Jersey. The school operates under the terms of a charter granted by the New Jersey Department of Education granted in 2006. In addition to students from Franklin Township, the school also serves students from the neighboring communities of New Brunswick and North Brunswick in Middlesex County.

As of the 2024–25 school year, the school had an enrollment of 1,396 students and 116.7 classroom teachers (on an FTE basis), for a student–teacher ratio of 12.0:1. There were 361 students (25.9% of enrollment) eligible for free lunch and 102 (7.3% of students) eligible for reduced-cost lunch.

== Awards, recognition and rankings ==
In 2016, the school was one of ten schools in New Jersey, and the only charter school, recognized as a National Blue Ribbon School by the United States Department of Education.

== Extracurricular activities ==
Clubs and activities offered at the school include Model United Nations, Newspaper Club, Science Olympiad, Chess Club, Debate Club, Year Book, Art Club, Guitar Club, Band, Chorus, Writing Workshop (Middle / High), Math Club, Robotics Club (Middle / High), Turkish Club, Chinese Club, Spanish Club, Computer Science Club, National Junior Honor Society, National Honor Society, Soccer Club, Basketball Club, and the Volleyball Club.

== Athletics ==
The Central Jersey College Prep Charter School Cougars participate in interscholastic sports including men's basketball, men's soccer and men's and women's volleyball, competing independently of any conference under the auspices of the New Jersey State Interscholastic Athletic Association (NJSIAA). With 136 students in grades 10-12, the school was classified by the NJSIAA for the 2019–20 school year as Group I for most athletic competition purposes, which included schools with an enrollment of 75 to 476 students in that grade range.

== Administration ==
The school's Chief Education Officer is Namik Sercan.
