= Clyde, New Jersey =

Populated place in Somerset County, New Jersey, US

- Census-designated place
- Location in Somerset County Location in New Jersey Location in the United States
- Coordinates: 40.487341°N 74.513189°W
- Country: United States
- State: New Jersey
- County: Somerset
- Township: Franklin

Area
  - Total: 0.38 sq mi (0.99 km^{2})
  - Land: 0.38 sq mi (0.99 km^{2})
  - Water: 0 sq mi (0.00 km^{2}) 0.00%
- Elevation: 115 ft (35 m)

Population (2020)
  - Total: 243
  - Density: 634/sq mi (244.8/km^{2})
- Time zone: UTC−05:00 (Eastern (EST))
  - Summer (DST): UTC−04:00 (Eastern (EDT))
- Area codes: 609 and 732/848
- FIPS code: 34-13990
- GNIS feature ID: 02583980

Clyde is an unincorporated community and census-designated place (CDP) located in Franklin Township, in Somerset, in the U.S. state of New Jersey. It was a station stop on the Penna RR's Millstone Branch. As of the 2020 census, Clyde had a population of 243.

== Geography ==
According to the United States Census Bureau, Clyde had a total area of 0.383 square miles (0.993 km^{2}), all of which was land.

== Demographics ==
Historical population
| Census | Pop. | Note | %± |
|---|---|---|---|
| 2010 | 213 | | — |
| 2020 | 243 | | 14.1% |
Population sources: 2010 2020

Clyde first appeared as a census designated place in the 2010 U.S. census formed from part of the Somerset CDP and additional area.

=== 2020 census ===
Clyde CDP, New Jersey – Racial and ethnic composition Note: the US Census treats Hispanic/Latino as an ethnic category. This table excludes Latinos from the racial categories and assigns them to a separate category. Hispanics/Latinos may be of any race.
| Race / Ethnicity (NH = Non-Hispanic) | Pop 2010 | Pop 2020 | % 2010 | % 2020 |
|---|---|---|---|---|
| White alone (NH) | 132 | 120 | 61.97% | 49.38% |
| Black or African American alone (NH) | 59 | 60 | 27.70% | 24.69% |
| Native American or Alaska Native alone (NH) | 0 | 0 | 0.00% | 0.00% |
| Asian alone (NH) | 13 | 24 | 6.10% | 9.88% |
| Native Hawaiian or Pacific Islander alone (NH) | 0 | 0 | 0.00% | 0.00% |
| Other race alone (NH) | 0 | 1 | 0.00% | 0.41% |
| Mixed race or Multiracial (NH) | 0 | 11 | 0.00% | 4.53% |
| Hispanic or Latino (any race) | 9 | 27 | 4.23% | 11.11% |
| Total | 213 | 243 | 100.00% | 100.00% |

=== 2010 census ===
The 2010 United States census counted 213 people, 73 households, and 64 families in the CDP. The population density was 555.8 per square mile (214.6/km^{2}). There were 73 housing units at an average density of 190.5 per square mile (73.6/km^{2}). The racial makeup was 65.73% (140) White, 28.17% (60) Black or African American, 0.00% (0) Native American, 6.10% (13) Asian, 0.00% (0) Pacific Islander, 0.00% (0) from other races, and 0.00% (0) from two or more races. Hispanic or Latino of any race were 4.23% (9) of the population.

Of the 73 households, 37.0% had children under the age of 18; 74.0% were married couples living together; 9.6% had a female householder with no husband present and 12.3% were non-families. Of all households, 11.0% were made up of individuals and 2.7% had someone living alone who was 65 years of age or older. The average household size was 2.92 and the average family size was 3.14.

24.9% of the population were under the age of 18, 3.8% from 18 to 24, 16.0% from 25 to 44, 43.2% from 45 to 64, and 12.2% who were 65 years of age or older. The median age was 46.6 years. For every 100 females, the population had 100.9 males. For every 100 females ages 18 and older there were 95.1 males.
