= Statue of Rabindranath Tagore =

2021 sculpture in Somerset, New Jersey, U.S.

- Subject: Rabindranath Tagore
- Location: Somerset, New Jersey, U.S.; 40°30′28.9″N 74°32′15.2″W

A statue of Rabindranath Tagore was installed in Somerset, New Jersey in 2021.
