= Franklin Center (disambiguation) =

Franklin Center may refer to:

- Franklin Center (Chicago)
- John Hope Franklin Center for Interdisciplinary and International Studies
- Franklin News Foundation, formerly the Franklin Center for Government and Public Integrity
- Franklin Center, New Jersey

== See also ==
- Franklin, Quebec, also known as Franklin Centre, Quebec
