= Anthony Bartholomay =

American mathematician (1919-1975)

Anthony Francis Bartholomay (1919–1975) was an American mathematician who introduced molecular set theory, a topic on which he wrote books.

== Life ==
Bartholomay was born on August 11, 1919. He would receive degrees from Hamilton College, Syracuse University, and Harvard University. Bartholomay would work at Harvard Medical School, Medical School of Ohio, Brown University, Keuka College, Rensselaer Polytechnic Institute, and Rutgers University. He died on March 21, 1975, at 55 years old. A resident of the Somerset section of Franklin Township, Somerset County, New Jersey, he died at a New Brunswick, New Jersey hospital from a stroke he had three weeks prior to his death.

== Molecular set theory ==
Molecular set theory (MST) is a mathematical formulation of the wide-sense chemical kinetics of biomolecular reactions in terms of sets of molecules and their chemical transformations represented by set-theoretical mappings between molecular sets.

== Career ==
Bartholomay was a professor and chairman of the Department of Mathematical Medicine at the Medical College of Ohio. He was only part of the Department of Mathematical Medicine from 1969 until 1972, when he left. The department subsequently collapsed the following year.

Howard Hughes Medical Institute website had Anthony Bartholomay listed as an investigator but was hosted at Harvard Medical School in 1957.

== See also ==
- Mathematical biology
