= Eastern precinct, Somerset County, New Jersey =

Former municipality in Somerset County, New Jersey

Coordinates: 40.490°N 74.485°W

The Eastern precinct (Note: It was spelled in records as Estering from 1764 to 1777, and as Eastern from 1780 to 1797.) was one of three components of Somerset County, New Jersey, United States, that existed from c. 1745 to 1798.

== History ==
The Eastern precinct, together with the Northern precinct and Western precinct, were created around 1745 as administrative divisions of Somerset County while still under British colonial rule.

On February 21, 1798, the remaining portions of the Eastern precinct were taken to form Franklin Township as one of the first 104 townships created in New Jersey. With the formation of Franklin Township, Eastern precinct was dissolved.
