= Joshua Kuroda-Grauer =

American baseball player (born 2003)

Athletics – No. 44
- Infielder
- Born: January 31, 2003 (age 23); New Brunswick, New Jersey, U.S.
- Bats: Right Throws: Right

MLB debut
- June 29, 2026, for the Athletics

MLB statistics (through 2026 season)
- Batting average: .417
- Home runs: 1
- Runs batted in: 4
- Stats at Baseball Reference

Teams
- Athletics (2026–present)

Joshua Kuroda-Grauer (born January 31, 2003) is an American professional baseball infielder for the Athletics of Major League Baseball (MLB). He played college baseball for the Rutgers Scarlet Knights and was selected by the Athletics in the third round of the 2024 MLB draft. He made his MLB debut in 2026.

== Amateur career ==
Born in New Brunswick, New Jersey, Kuroda-Grauer grew up in the Somerset section of Franklin Township, Somerset County, New Jersey and attended Franklin High School, where he played baseball and basketball. He was named the Courier News Player of the Year as a senior.

Kuroda-Grauer played college baseball for the Rutgers Scarlet Knights for three seasons. He was named third-team All-Big Ten Conference as a freshman after slashing .299/.365/.416 with 5 home runs and 39 RBIs. Kuroda-Grauer batted .298 during his sophomore season. He played collegiate summer baseball for the Bourne Braves of the Cape Cod Baseball League in 2022 and 2023 and was named the Playoff MVP for the 2023 season. Kuroda-Grauer was named the Big Ten Conference Baseball Player of the Year as a junior after finishing second in the nation with a .428 batting average.

== Professional career ==
The Oakland Athletics selected Kuroda-Grauer in the third round of the 2024 Major League Baseball draft. He was assigned to the Stockton Ports of the Single-A California League to begin his professional career. Kuroda-Grauer was promoted to the Lansing Lugnuts of the High-A Midwest League after batting .389 with 13 runs scored in 12 games with Stockton.

On June 29, 2026, Kuroda-Grauer was selected to the 40-man roster and promoted to the major leagues for the first time. He made his major league debut that night against the Los Angeles Dodgers and went 3-for-4 with a double, one RBI, and one run scored in a 9–4 loss. Kuroda-Grauer recorded his first career home run in the second inning of a game against the Arizona Diamondbacks on July 20. In the fifth inning of that game, he fouled a ball off of his groin. He continued the at-bat, hitting a single, but was removed after that inning, finishing the game 2-for-3. That evening, he underwent surgery to repair a ruptured testicle and was placed on the 10-day injured list. Kuroda-Grauer was transferred to the 60–day injured list on September 1. He was activated on September 22.
