= East Rocky Hill, New Jersey =

Populated place in Somerset County, New Jersey, US

- Census-designated place
- Location in Somerset County Location in New Jersey Location in the United States
- Coordinates: 40.415133°N 74.617903°W
- Country: United States
- State: New Jersey
- County: Somerset
- Township: Franklin

Area
  - Total: 4.25 sq mi (11.01 km^{2})
  - Land: 4.17 sq mi (10.79 km^{2})
  - Water: 0.081 sq mi (0.21 km^{2}) 2.05%
- Elevation: 289 ft (88 m)

Population (2020)
  - Total: 468
  - Density: 112.3/sq mi (43.37/km^{2})
- Time zone: UTC−05:00 (Eastern (EST))
  - Summer (DST): UTC−04:00 (Eastern (EDT))
- Area codes: 609 and 732/848
- FIPS code: 34-19490
- GNIS feature ID: 02583986

East Rocky Hill is an unincorporated community and census-designated place (CDP) located in Franklin Township, in Somerset County, in the U.S. state of New Jersey. As of the 2020 census, East Rocky Hill had a population of 468.

== Geography ==
According to the United States Census Bureau, East Rocky Hill had a total area of 4.252 square miles (11.014 km^{2}), including 4.165 square miles (10.788 km^{2}) of land and 0.087 square miles (0.226 km^{2}) of water (2.05%).

== Demographics ==
Historical population
Census	Pop.	Note	%±
2010	469		—
2020	468		−0.2%
Population sources: 2010 2020

East Rocky Hill first appeared as a census designated place in the 2010 U.S. census.

=== 2020 census ===
East Rocky Hill CDP, New Jersey – Racial and ethnic composition Note: the US Census treats Hispanic/Latino as an ethnic category. This table excludes Latinos from the racial categories and assigns them to a separate category. Hispanics/Latinos may be of any race.
Race / Ethnicity (NH = Non-Hispanic)	Pop 2010	Pop 2020	% 2010	% 2020
White alone (NH)	319	279	68.02%	59.62%
Black or African American alone (NH)	36	46	7.68%	9.83%
Native American or Alaska Native alone (NH)	0	0	0.00%	0.00%
Asian alone (NH)	33	37	7.04%	7.91%
Native Hawaiian or Pacific Islander alone (NH)	0	0	0.00%	0.00%
Other race alone (NH)	0	2	0.00%	0.43%
Mixed race or Multiracial (NH)	8	13	1.71%	2.78%
Hispanic or Latino (any race)	73	91	15.57%	19.44%
Total	469	468	100.00%	100.00%

=== 2010 census ===
The 2010 United States census counted 469 people, 160 households, and 115 families in the CDP. The population density was 112.6 per square mile (43.5/km^{2}). There were 172 housing units at an average density of 41.3 per square mile (15.9/km^{2}). The racial makeup was 74.20% (348) White, 7.68% (36) Black or African American, 0.00% (0) Native American, 7.04% (33) Asian, 0.00% (0) Pacific Islander, 8.96% (42) from other races, and 2.13% (10) from two or more races. Hispanic or Latino of any race were 15.57% (73) of the population.

Of the 160 households, 30.0% had children under the age of 18; 64.4% were married couples living together; 4.4% had a female householder with no husband present and 28.1% were non-families. Of all households, 22.5% were made up of individuals and 8.8% had someone living alone who was 65 years of age or older. The average household size was 2.93 and the average family size was 3.39.

26.4% of the population were under the age of 18, 7.2% from 18 to 24, 22.2% from 25 to 44, 29.6% from 45 to 64, and 14.5% who were 65 years of age or older. The median age was 40.6 years. For every 100 females, the population had 110.3 males. For every 100 females ages 18 and older there were 100.6 males.
