= Carlton Agudosi =

American gridiron football player (born 1994)

Profile
- Position: Wide receiver

Personal information
- Born: February 1, 1994 (age 32); Franklin Township, New Jersey, U.S.
- Listed height: 6 ft 6 in (1.98 m)
- Listed weight: 220 lb (100 kg)

Career information
- High school: Somerset (NJ) Franklin
- College: Rutgers
- NFL draft: 2017: undrafted

Career history
- Arizona Cardinals (2017–2018); Philadelphia Eagles (2019)*; St. Louis BattleHawks (2020); Winnipeg Blue Bombers (2021–2023); Toronto Argonauts (2023)
- * Offseason or practice squad member only
- Stats at Pro Football Reference

Carlton Agudosi (born February 1, 1994) is an American professional football wide receiver. He was signed by the Arizona Cardinals as an undrafted free agent in 2017 and played college football at Rutgers.

== Early life ==
Agudosi grew up in the Somerset section of Franklin Township, Somerset County, New Jersey and attended Franklin High School, from which he graduated in 2012.

== College career ==
Agudosi played in 45 games in his career at Rutgers, recording 35 receptions for 513 yards and two touchdowns. His low production in college was largely due to the cycle of five offensive coordinators and five position coaches in his five years as a Scarlet Knight. He was named to the Academic All-Big Ten team as a sophomore in 2014.

== Professional career ==
=== Arizona Cardinals ===
Agudosi signed the Arizona Cardinals as an undrafted free agent on May 2, 2017. He was waived on September 2, 2017, and was signed to the practice squad the next day. He was promoted to the active roster on November 22, 2017. He was waived on December 11, 2017, and was re-signed to the practice squad. He signed a reserve/future contract with the Cardinals on January 2, 2018.

On September 1, 2018, Agudosi was waived by the Cardinals.

=== Philadelphia Eagles ===
On January 7, 2019, Agudosi signed with the Philadelphia Eagles. He was waived during final roster cuts on August 30, 2019.

=== St. Louis BattleHawks ===
In October 2019, Agudosi was selected by the St. Louis BattleHawks during the open phase of the 2020 XFL draft. He had his contract terminated when the league suspended operations on April 10, 2020.

=== Winnipeg Blue Bombers ===
Agudosi signed with the Winnipeg Blue Bombers of the CFL on April 30, 2021. He was released on October 5, 2023.

=== Toronto Argonauts ===
Agudosi was signed to the practice roster of the Toronto Argonauts of the CFL on October 10, 2023. He was promoted to the active roster on October 27, moved back to the practice roster on November 2, and released on November 13, 2023.

== Personal life ==
Agudosi is of Nigerian descent through his father.

Agudosi hosts a Football Camp in his Former Highschool (Franklin Highschool)
