= Northern precinct, Somerset County, New Jersey =

Coordinates: 40.68°N 74.58°W

The Northern precinct was one of three components of Somerset County, New Jersey, United States, that was created circa 1745 and existed until 1760.

The Northern precinct, together with the Eastern precinct and Western precinct, were created as administrative divisions of Somerset County, while still under British colonial rule.

Portions of the precinct were taken on April 4, 1749, to form both Bedminster Township and Bridgewater Township.

On May 24, 1760, the remaining portions of the Northern precinct were taken to form Bernardston Township, which has since been renamed to Bernards Township. With the creation of Bernardston Township, Northern precinct was dissolved.
