= Roy E. LaGrone =

American art director and illustrator (1921–1993)

- LaGrone in 1960
- Born: Roy Elmer LaGrone; February 1, 1921; Pine Bluff, Arkansas, U.S.
- Died: December 8, 1993 (aged 72); Somerset, New Jersey, U.S.
- Education: Tuskegee Institute, University of Florence, Pratt Institute
- Website: royelagrone.com

Roy Elmer LaGrone (February 1, 1921 – December 8, 1993) was an American art director and illustrator. He was a member of the Tuskegee Airmen.

== Biography ==
LaGrone was born in February 1, 1921, in Pine Bluff, Arkansas. He became interested in aviation after riding in an airplane above Pine Bluff as a teenager. He studied at the Tuskegee Institute. Before graduating he was drafted into the Army Air Corps in 1942. During World War II LaGrone fought with the 332d Fighter Group (known as the Tuskegee Airmen) in Africa and Italy.

He was discharged from military service in 1946. LaGrone remained in Italy for a time to study at the University of Florence. He returned to the United States and completed his studies at the Pratt Institute, graduating in 1949.

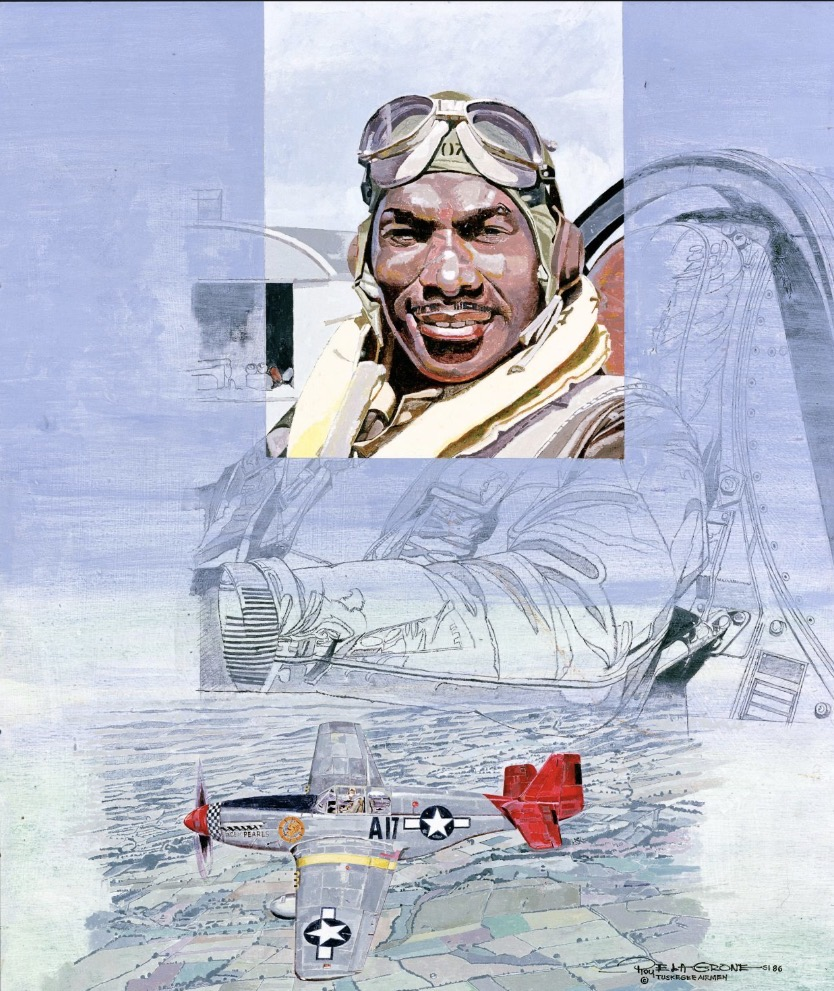
1988 illustration by LaGrone, of Herman A. Lawson

LaGrone's employment included art director for the magazine Amerika, art director of the Rutgers University Medical School, and creating historical images of the U.S. Air Force and the Tuskegee Airmen. By January 1960, he was artistic director of the book publisher Avon and broadcaster Radio Free Europe. He was a member of the Society of Illustrators and created record covers and book jackets as a freelance artist. He retired in 1991.

LaGrone was married to Ester LaGrone, with whom he had two children. He died at his home in the Somerset section of Franklin Township, Somerset County, New Jersey, on December 8, 1993, from a myocardial infraction. In 1996, his artwork was featured in Tuskegee's Heroes: As Depicted in the Aviation Art of Roy E. La Grone which was published by MotorBooks International. In 2001, he was inducted into the Aviation Hall of Fame and Museum of New Jersey.
