= Western precinct, Somerset County, New Jersey =

Coordinates: 40.431°N 74.666°W

The Western precinct was one of three components of Somerset County, New Jersey, United States, that was created circa 1745 and existed until 1798.

The Western precinct, together with the Eastern precinct and Northern precinct, were created as administrative divisions of Somerset County, while still under British colonial rule.

Portions of the precinct were taken on September 12, 1771, to form Hillsborough Township.

On February 21, 1798, the remaining portions of the Western precinct were taken to form Montgomery Township as one of the first 104 townships created in New Jersey. With the formation of Montgomery Township, Western precinct was dissolved.
