= Franklin Center, New Jersey =

Populated place in Somerset County, New Jersey, US

- Census-designated place
- Location in Somerset County Location in New Jersey Location in the United States
- Coordinates: 40.531534°N 74.54141°W
- Country: United States
- State: New Jersey
- County: Somerset
- Township: Franklin

Area
  - Total: 6.71 sq mi (17.37 km^{2})
  - Land: 6.59 sq mi (17.08 km^{2})
  - Water: 0.11 sq mi (0.29 km^{2}) 1.53%
- Elevation: 82 ft (25 m)

Population (2020)
  - Total: 6,803
  - Density: 1,031.4/sq mi (398.23/km^{2})
- Time zone: UTC−05:00 (Eastern (EST))
  - Summer (DST): UTC−04:00 (Eastern (EDT))
- Area codes: 609 and 732/848
- FIPS code: 34-24965
- GNIS feature ID: 02583990

Franklin Center is an unincorporated community and census-designated place (CDP) located in Franklin Township, in Somerset County, in the U.S. state of New Jersey. As of the 2020 census, Franklin Center had a population of 6,803.

== Geography ==
According to the United States Census Bureau, Franklin Center had a total area of 6.682 square miles (17.305 km^{2}), including 6.579 square miles (17.040 km^{2}) of land and 0.103 square miles (0.266 km^{2}) of water (1.53%).

== Demographics ==
Historical population
Census	Pop.	Note	%±
2010	4,460		—
2020	6,803		52.5%
Population sources: 2010 2020

Franklin Center first appeared as a census designated place in the 2010 U.S. census.

=== Racial and ethnic composition ===
Franklin Center CDP, New Jersey – Racial and ethnic composition Note: the US Census treats Hispanic/Latino as an ethnic category. This table excludes Latinos from the racial categories and assigns them to a separate category. Hispanics/Latinos may be of any race.
Race / Ethnicity (NH = Non-Hispanic)	Pop 2010	Pop 2020	% 2010	% 2020
White alone (NH)	3,161	3,324	70.87%	48.86%
Black or African American alone (NH)	393	863	8.81%	12.69%
Native American or Alaska Native alone (NH)	1	7	0.02%	0.10%
Asian alone (NH)	577	1,874	12.94%	27.55%
Native Hawaiian or Pacific Islander alone (NH)	0	0	0.00%	0.00%
Other race alone (NH)	9	29	0.20%	0.43%
Mixed race or Multiracial (NH)	54	175	1.21%	2.57%
Hispanic or Latino (any race)	265	531	5.94%	7.81%
Total	4,460	6,803	100.00%	100.00%

=== 2020 census ===
As of the 2020 census, Franklin Center had a population of 6,803. The median age was 53.8 years. 13.1% of residents were under the age of 18 and 35.2% were 65 years of age or older. For every 100 females there were 85.8 males, and for every 100 females age 18 and over there were 83.4 males.

99.6% of residents lived in urban areas, while 0.4% lived in rural areas.

There were 2,989 households, of which 19.0% had children under the age of 18 living in them. Of all households, 56.6% were married-couple households, 11.3% were households with a male householder and no spouse or partner present, and 27.8% were households with a female householder and no spouse or partner present. About 27.5% of all households were made up of individuals and 17.1% had someone living alone who was 65 years of age or older.

There were 3,310 housing units, of which 9.7% were vacant. The homeowner vacancy rate was 1.3% and the rental vacancy rate was 10.1%.

=== 2010 census ===
The 2010 United States census counted 4,460 people, 1,907 households, and 1,310 families in the CDP. The population density was 677.9 per square mile (261.7/km^{2}). There were 2,141 housing units at an average density of 325.4 per square mile (125.6/km^{2}). The racial makeup was 74.60% (3,327) White, 9.19% (410) Black or African American, 0.04% (2) Native American, 13.07% (583) Asian, 0.00% (0) Pacific Islander, 1.55% (69) from other races, and 1.55% (69) from two or more races. Hispanic or Latino of any race were 5.94% (265) of the population.

Of the 1,907 households, 13.2% had children under the age of 18; 61.7% were married couples living together; 4.8% had a female householder with no husband present and 31.3% were non-families. Of all households, 27.9% were made up of individuals and 14.7% had someone living alone who was 65 years of age or older. The average household size was 2.14 and the average family size was 2.57.

11.0% of the population were under the age of 18, 12.0% from 18 to 24, 15.5% from 25 to 44, 29.6% from 45 to 64, and 32.0% who were 65 years of age or older. The median age was 55.6 years. For every 100 females, the population had 92.0 males. For every 100 females ages 18 and older there were 91.4 males.
