= Christopher Massimine =

American theater producer

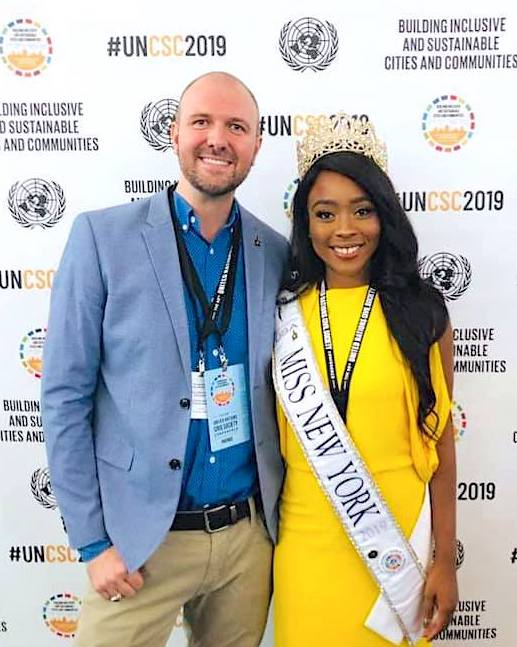
Massimine and Nia Franklin at the 2019 United Nations Civil Society Conference

Christopher Massimine (born May 1986) is an American former theater producer and the former CEO of the National Yiddish Theatre Folksbiene. In 2019, he was appointed managing director of the Pioneer Theatre Company at the University of Utah, but he resigned in August 2021, citing mental illness, in response to reports that he fabricated large portions of his résumé.

== Education ==
Massimine was born in New Jersey and grew up in Somerset. He attended New York University, where he received a bachelor's degree, though he falsely claimed to have also received a master's degree from the university.

== Career ==
In 2016, Massimine was appointed chief executive officer of the National Yiddish Theatre Folksbiene. He was the executive producer of the 2015 KulturfestNYC, an international Jewish performing arts festival. Later that year, he co-produced a tribute concert for Theodore Bikel. During Massimine's tenure at the National Yiddish Theatre Folksbiene, the theatre was an associate producer of the 2017 Broadway production of Indecent, which was nominated for the Tony Award for Best Play. In 2018, Massimine was executive producer of the theatre's U.S. premiere of Fidler Afn Dakh, a Yiddish-language production of Fiddler on the Roof directed by Joel Grey.

In 2019, Massimine was named managing director of the Pioneer Theatre Company at the University of Utah, succeeding Chris Lino, who had retired.

In May 2021, Massimine went on approved personal leave from the university, pending an investigation, after reports by Fox 13 and The Salt Lake Tribune that he falsified numerous credits on his résumé and claimed to have received a medal from an arts organization which did not actually exist. Additionally, despite claiming to have received Tony Award nominations for his work on American Idiot and Indecent, the Tony Awards confirmed that Massimine was not actually nominated.

In August 2021, shortly before a report by The New York Times was published corroborating the claims against him, he resigned and said he had battled mental illness his entire life. Massimine was diagnosed with a Cluster B personality disorder. In a 2022 column for Newsweek, Massimine said about his mental illness, "As part of my diagnosis, when I am in mental distress, I create fabrications to help build myself up, since that self-esteem by itself doesn't exist. I compensated in the only way I knew how to: I created my own reality, and eventually that spilled into my work."
