= Margit Feldman =

Hungarian-American public speaker (1929–2020)

- Feldman in 2009
- Born: Margit Buchhalter; June 12, 1929; Budapest, Hungary
- Died: April 14, 2020 (aged 90); Somerset, New Jersey, U.S.
- Occupation: Public speaker Educator; Activist
- Known for: Holocaust survivor
- Spouse: Harvey Feldman (1953–2020)
- Children: 2

Margit Buchhalter Feldman (June 12, 1929 – April 14, 2020) was a Hungarian-American public speaker, educator, activist, and Holocaust survivor. Feldman and her family were placed in a concentration camp in 1944, where her parents were killed immediately. The 15-year-old survived by saying she was older, old enough to be sent to a work camp. She was freed from Bergen-Belsen concentration camp on April 15, 1945. After moving to the United States, she raised a family and became a public speaker, sharing her experience with students until her death.

== Early life ==
Margit Buchhalter was born June 12, 1929, in Budapest, Hungary. Her parents were Joseph and Theresa Buchhalter. The family lived in Tolcsva, Hungary.

=== Holocaust ===
When she was fourteen, the Nazis invaded Tolcsva. Her family was moved into a Nazi ghetto in another town. In April 1944, her family was transported to Auschwitz and her parents were killed immediately in the gas chambers. Buchhalter lied to the German guards, saying that she was 18 years old, and was sent to Kraków, Poland, where she worked at a quarry. The Germans tattooed "A23029" on her left arm as her identification. After Kraków, she returned to Auschwitz.

Buchhalter was transported to a women's camp in Gruenberg, where she met Gerda Weissmann Klein. Buchhalter was in the death march from Gruenberg to Bergen-Belsen. On April 15, 1945, Bergen-Belsen was liberated. When liberated Buchhalter suffered from pleurisy and pneumonia, and had suffered injuries from the explosives set off by German soldiers in an attempt to destroy the camp. Buchhalter was one of two family members to survive out of the 68 who were transported to concentration camps. Buchhalter moved to Sweden, where she recovered. She emigrated to the United States in 1947, and moved to New York, where she lived with her aunt Harriet Boehm, and cousins.

== Career ==
Buchhalter became an X-ray technician.

=== Educator and activist ===
Feldman did not speak publicly about her experience in the Holocaust for many years. In the 1970s, while living in Bound Brook with her own family, a boy from her neighborhood asked Feldman to speak to his elementary school class about her experience. She declined to speak to the group, but allowed the boy to record her talking about it. He played the tape to his class. The class was deeply affected by her story and the boy gave the feedback to Feldman, who realized the importance of sharing her experience.

Feldman co-founded the Raritan Valley Community College Institute for Holocaust & Genocide Studies in 1981. She also co-founded the New Jersey Commission on Holocaust Education with then New Jersey state assemblyman Jim McGreevey in 1991. In 1994, she supported a bill mandating Holocaust and genocide curriculum in New Jersey schools.

She served as president of the Jewish Federation of Somerset & Warren Counties and chair of the United Jewish Appeal and Israel Bonds Campaigns. She was also president of the Jewish Home for the Aged, vice president of Congregation Knesseth Israel and a member of Temple Sholom in Bridgewater, New Jersey.

In 2003, she co-authored the autobiography Margit: A teenager's journey through the Holocaust and beyond.

== Personal life ==
In 1953, she married Harvey Feldman, who she met while hospitalized to recover from tuberculosis. The couple lived in Bound Brook, New Jersey and had two children.

Feldman, her family, and the New Jersey Commission on Holocaust Education created the Margit Feldman Teaching Award in 2014. The award is given to New Jersey teachers who demonstrate "outstanding" in-class education about the Holocaust, bias, prejudice, bullying, and bigotry. In 2016, Peppy Margolis directed a documentary about Feldman, entitled Not A23029. Michael Berenbaum narrated the short film.

=== Death ===
Feldman lived in Somerset, New Jersey, until her death on April 14, 2020, from COVID-19-related complications.

== Works ==
- with Bernard Weinstein. Margit: A teenager's journey through the Holocaust and beyond. Scottsdale: Princeton Editorial Associates (2003).
