= Jeanette Mundt =

American painter (born 1982)

Jeanette Mundt (born 1982, USA) is an American painter, best known for her works in the 2019 Whitney Biennial. In her different bodies of work, Mundt combines iconic references with others that are more personal and intimate in her quest to perpetually reconfigure the image—gesturing towards how our understanding is always in flux and therefore we can’t possibly be consistent in our seeing, in our psychic space.

== Work ==
Mundt’s dynamic, formally omnivorous practice freely taps a variety of input, ranging from art historical references to personal photographs. Reworking and repurposing motifs from sources as diverse as Odilon Redon, illuminated manuscripts, medieval tapestries, Wade Guyton, and Matthias Grünewald, Mundt’s recent paintings eschew adhering to an individual style in favor of a poly-aesthetic approach. Two ongoing currents in Mundt’s practice come to the fore in recent times: an interest in painting elements in motion, such as fire and light, and bringing art historical imagery into new configurations that explore the ambiguous space between how we consume images in everyday life and art. Her richly seductive works, which construct images from multiple sources, speak to questions of painting, depiction, correction, and construction. The mood of these works—which are in turns contemplative, sensual, foreboding, and celestial—respond to the rage and rapture that pervade a cultural moment marked by climate change, the rise of religious extremism, and the curtailment of women’s rights.

Jeanette Mundt’s individual paintings avoid offering direct commentary on social and political issues but read in relation to one another. They nonetheless absorb and reconfigure the conflicting currents that shape their time. In God Told Him to Wait, Mundt' solo exhibition at Société Berlin in 2023, she oscillates between figuration and abstraction, between the bodies of women and those of animals, between religious iconography and the language of the glitch—a tendency that Bettina Funcke describes as defocalizing: letting things in, trying out different perspectives, aesthetics, and approaches, which allows her works to “flicker with flexibility and vulnerability.” Painting, or more precisely looking at painting has the capacity to create new worlds. It can induce an urge to identify in the viewer, which is undercut by the medium’s own hermeticism. Difficult painting refuses, it resists easy assimilation and pat answers.

== Exhibitions (selection) ==
Solo

- 2023: A Reality, TANK Shanghai
- 2023: God Told Him to Wait, Société, Berlin
- 2022: Art Basel Unlimited, Basel
- 2021: Wash Us With Fire, Société, Berlin
- 2020: Still American, Company Gallery, New York
- 2019: If The Devil Could Kill You Right Now He Would, Overduin & co., Los Angeles
- 2018: Hell on Earth, Gavin Brown’s Enterprise, New York
- 2018: Addict Distract, Bridget Donahue, New York
- 2017: Screen Series: GOD, New Museum, New York
- 2016: CONDO Project, Hosted by Project Native Informant, London (with Josh Kolbo)
- 2015: Ultra Beauty, Société, Berlin
- 2014: Das Mundt, 576 Morgan Ave Apt 3L, New York
- 2013: I know I am when you make me, Clifton Benevento, New York
- 2010: Project Room, Galerie Mikael Andersen, Berlin

Group

- 2024: Angelic Rebels, Company Gallery, New York
- 2023: Baroque, Champ Lacombe, Biarritz
- 2023: Magpie, Société, Berlin
- 2022: A Maze Zanine, Amaze Zaning, A-Mezzaning, Meza-9, David Zwirner, New York
- 2021: an ego of her own, Kaufmann Repetto, Milan
- 2019: Whitney Biennial 2019, Whitney Museum of American Art, New York
- 2018: The Vitalist Economy of Painting by Isabelle Graw, Galerie Neu, Berlin
- 2017: Sputterances, METRO PICTURES, New York
- 2017: New Acquisitions – Hildebrand Collection, G2 Kunsthalle, Leipzig
- 2016: Dasmundt’s Archeopsychic Zero, KGB Bar, New York
- 2016: Paul Heyer, Janette Mundt, Jesse Wine, Andrea Rosen Gallery, New York
- 2015: Works on Paper, Greene Naftali Gallery, New York
- 2014: Jeanette Mundt + Ned Vena, Federico Vavassori, Milan
- 2013: Reckless Head, Curated by Jeanette Mundt, Michael Benevento, Los Angeles
- 2012: Screening, Emergency Cheesecake, Whitney Museum of American Art, New York
- 2012: In Plain Sight, Mitchell-Innes & Nash, New York
- 2010: BigMinis, Musée d’art contemporain, Bordeaux
- 2009: If the Dogs are Barking, Artists Space, New York
- 2008: Friends and Family, Anton Kern Gallery, New York

== Blibliography ==
- 2024: MUNDT MUNDT MUNDT, Texts by Elise Duryee-Browner, Leonie Radine, Edition Société, Berlin
- 2019: All That Bloodletting, Design by Petra Hollenbach, Texts by Bettina Funcke, Beau Rutland, Edition of 500, Edition Société, Berlin
- 2015: Spread Eagle, Design, images and texts by Jeanette Mundt, Edition of 100, Edition Société, Berlin
- 2014: God, Josh Kolbo and Jeanette Mundt, Open Edition, New York
