= Somerset, New Jersey =

Place in Somerset County, New Jersey, United States

- Census-designated place
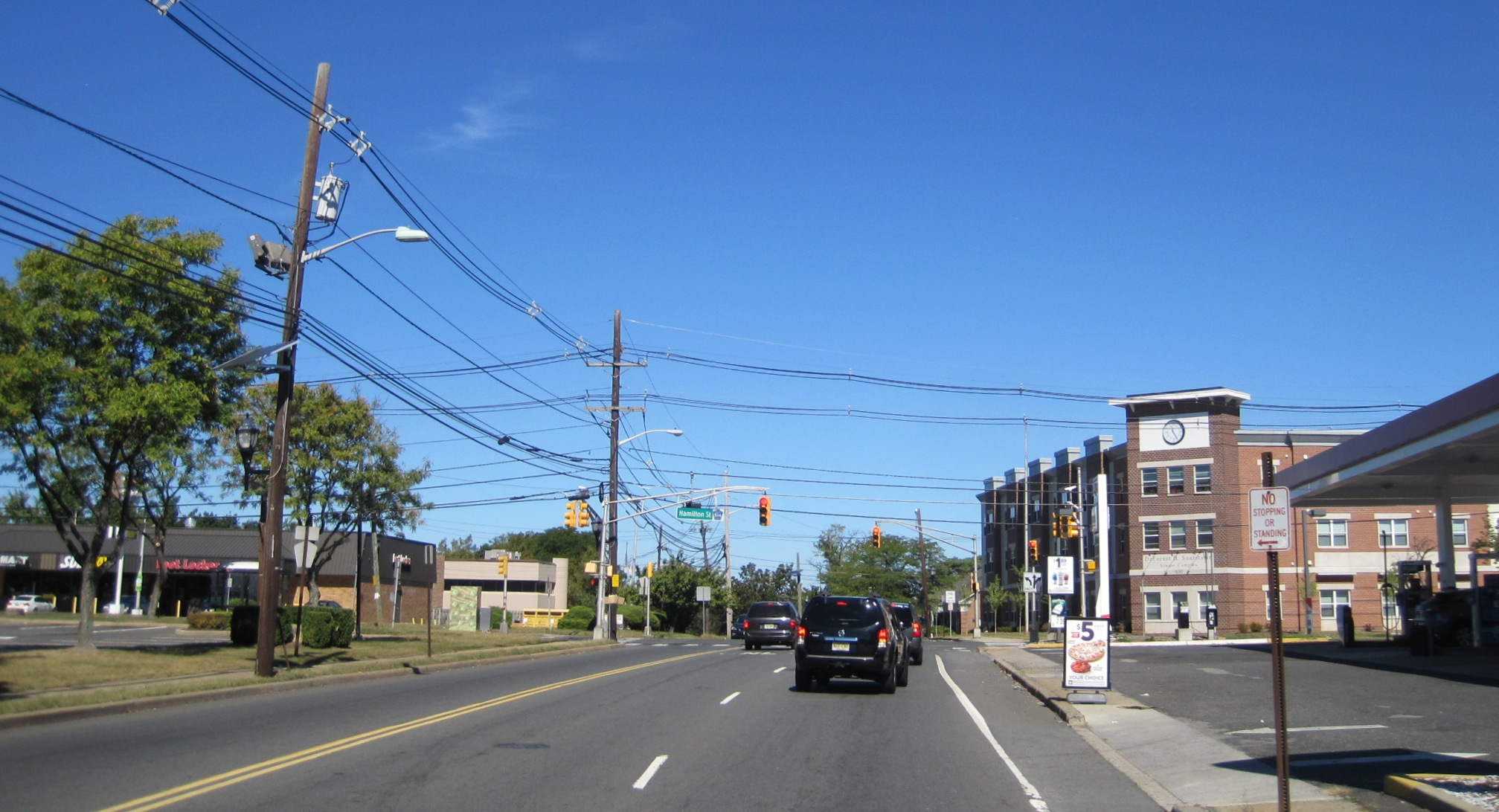
- Somerset at the intersection of Franklin Boulevard (CR 617) and Hamilton Street (CR 514)

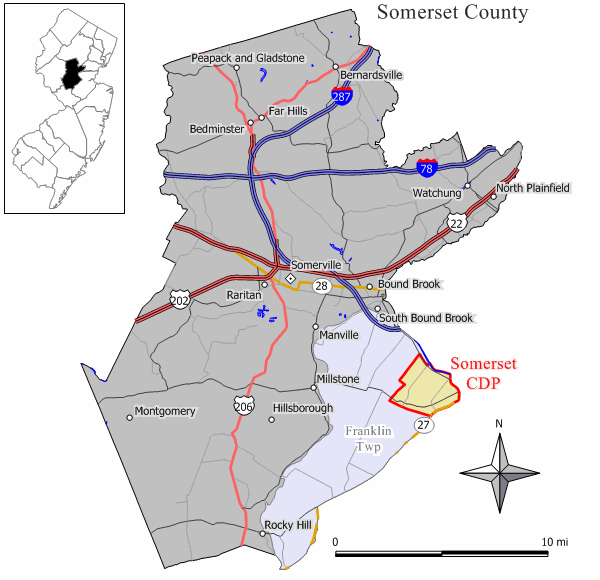
- Map of Somerset CDP highlighted within Somerset County. Right: Location of Somerset County in New Jersey.

- Location in Somerset County Location in New Jersey Location in the United States
- Coordinates: 40.508507°N 74.500207°W
- Country: United States
- State: New Jersey
- County: Somerset
- Township: Franklin

Area
  - Total: 6.46 sq mi (16.74 km^{2})
  - Land: 6.33 sq mi (16.39 km^{2})
  - Water: 0.14 sq mi (0.35 km^{2}) 1.82%
- Elevation: 118 ft (36 m)

Population (2020)
  - Total: 22,968
  - Density: 3,628.9/sq mi (1,401.11/km^{2})
- Time zone: UTC−05:00 (Eastern (EST))
  - Summer (DST): UTC−04:00 (Eastern (EDT))
- ZIP Codes: 08873, 08875
- Area codes: 732/848
- FIPS code: 34-68370
- GNIS feature ID: 02390312

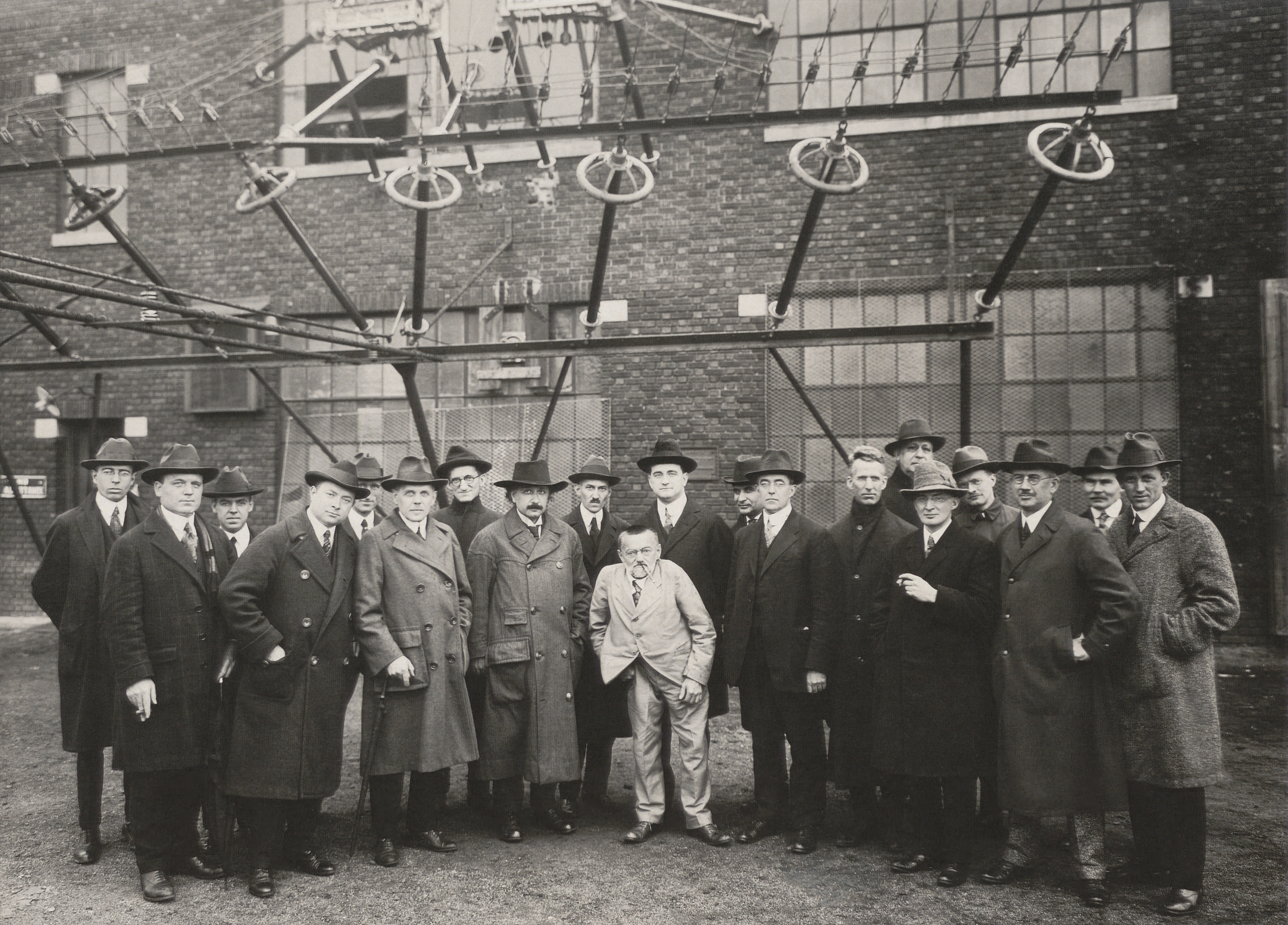
Marconi Wireless Station in Somerset, New Jersey in 1921

Somerset is an unincorporated community and census-designated place (CDP) located within Franklin Township, in Somerset County, in the U.S. state of New Jersey. As of the 2020 census, Somerset had a population of 22,968.

Somerset housed one of the first Marconi Wireless Stations in the United States.

== History ==
New Brunswick Marconi Station was located at JFK Boulevard and Easton Avenue just a few minutes from the New Brunswick border. Today it is the site of Guglielmo Marconi Memorial Park. It was an early radio transmitter facility built in 1913 and operated by the Marconi Wireless Telegraph Company of America. After the interruption of transatlantic telegraph cables by enemy action, the facility was confiscated by the United States Navy on April 7, 1917, to provide transatlantic communications during World War I. The New Brunswick Naval Radio Station was the principal wartime communication link between the United States and Europe, using the callsign NFF. President Woodrow Wilson's Fourteen Points speech was transmitted from the site in 1918. After the war, ownership of the station, along with Marconi's other US assets, was transferred from the navy to RCA. The antenna masts were demolished in 1952 to make room for what is now a small mall containing a Kmart, but the buildings on the other side of JFK Boulevard were spared. All but one of the brick buildings were demolished around 2004 to make way for a storage locker facility. The bricks and tiles were saved for use in any future restoration of the spared building, and the Marconi facility in Belmar, New Jersey.

During World War I, the original Marconi spark-gap transmitter was replaced with an Alexanderson alternator, the invention of the famous General Electric engineer, with an output power of 200 kilowatts and looking like an ordinary power station generator. Its frequency was around 17 kHz, which made its wavelength around 17,500 meters. The station used a huge 5,000-foot-long (1,500 m) antenna supported by eight 400-foot (120 m) tall steel masts, similar to the AT&T long wave telephone transmitter at RCA's Rocky Point, Long Island, transmitter facility.

== Geography ==
According to the United States Census Bureau, the CDP had a total area of 6.444 square miles (16.692 km^{2}), including 6.327 square miles (16.388 km^{2}) of land and 0.117 square miles (0.304 km^{2}) of water (1.82%).

=== Climate ===
The climate in the area is characterized by hot, humid summers and generally cool to cold winters. According to the Köppen climate classification system, Somerset has a humid continental climate, abbreviated "Dfa" on climate maps.

== Demographics ==
Historical population
Census	Pop.	Note	%±
1980	21,731		—
1990	22,070		1.6%
2000	23,040		4.4%
2010	22,083		−4.2%
2020	22,968		4.0%
Population sources: 1950 1960 1970; 1980 1990 2000; 2010

Somerset first appeared as a census designated place in the 1980 U.S. census.

=== 2020 census ===
As of the 2020 census, Somerset had a population of 22,968. The median age was 42.4 years. 17.3% of residents were under the age of 18 and 18.7% of residents were 65 years of age or older. For every 100 females there were 91.4 males, and for every 100 females age 18 and over there were 87.6 males age 18 and over.

100.0% of residents lived in urban areas, while 0.0% lived in rural areas.

There were 8,817 households in Somerset, of which 26.5% had children under the age of 18 living in them. Of all households, 49.4% were married-couple households, 16.4% were households with a male householder and no spouse or partner present, and 28.5% were households with a female householder and no spouse or partner present. About 27.1% of all households were made up of individuals and 11.2% had someone living alone who was 65 years of age or older.

There were 9,228 housing units, of which 4.5% were vacant. The homeowner vacancy rate was 0.9% and the rental vacancy rate was 6.2%.

Racial composition as of the 2020 census
Race	Number	Percent
White	8,070	35.1%
Black or African American	6,538	28.5%
American Indian and Alaska Native	132	0.6%
Asian	4,691	20.4%
Native Hawaiian and Other Pacific Islander	10	0.0%
Some other race	1,553	6.8%
Two or more races	1,974	8.6%
Hispanic or Latino (of any race)	3,349	14.6%

=== 2010 census ===
The 2010 United States census counted 22,083 people, 8,594 households, and 5,552 families in the CDP. The population density was 3,490.1 per square mile (1,347.5/km^{2}). There were 8,883 housing units at an average density of 1,403.9 per square mile (542.0/km^{2}). The racial makeup was 47.04% (10,387) White, 28.88% (6,378) Black or African American, 0.23% (50) Native American, 17.59% (3,885) Asian, 0.01% (3) Pacific Islander, 2.98% (659) from other races, and 3.26% (721) from two or more races. Hispanic or Latino of any race were 9.47% (2,092) of the population.

Of the 8,594 households, 27.7% had children under the age of 18; 51.1% were married couples living together; 9.9% had a female householder with no husband present and 35.4% were non-families. Of all households, 29.0% were made up of individuals and 9.9% had someone living alone who was 65 years of age or older. The average household size was 2.50 and the average family size was 3.14.

20.3% of the population were under the age of 18, 6.6% from 18 to 24, 30.4% from 25 to 44, 27.5% from 45 to 64, and 15.1% who were 65 years of age or older. The median age was 39.8 years. For every 100 females, the population had 91.4 males. For every 100 females ages 18 and older there were 87.2 males.

=== 2000 census ===
At the 2000 United States census there were 23,040 people, 8,238 households and 5,799 families residing in the CDP. The population density was 4,322.7 inhabitants per square mile (1,669.0/km^{2}). There were 8,424 housing units at an average density of 1,580.5 per square mile (610.2/km^{2}). The racial makeup of the CDP was 43.94% White, 38.55% African American, 0.26% Native American, 8.23% Asian, 0.05% Pacific Islander, 6.04% from other races, and 2.94% from two or more races. Hispanic or Latino of any race were 12.00% of the population.

There were 8,238 households, of which 31.2% had children under the age of 18 living with them, 52.6% were married couples living together, 12.9% had a female householder with no husband present, and 29.6% were non-families. 22.8% of all households were made up of individuals, and 6.8% had someone living alone who was 65 years of age or older. The average household size was 2.78 and the average family size was 3.29.

24.0% of the population were under the age of 18, 8.7% from 18 to 24, 32.6% from 25 to 44, 23.3% from 45 to 64, and 11.4% who were 65 years of age or older. The median age was 36 years. For every 100 females, there were 94.3 males. For every 100 females age 18 and over, there were 91.9 males.

The median household income was $65,831 and the median family income was $73,040. Males had a median income of $50,309 versus $36,162 for females. The per capita income for the CDP was $26,798. About 4.9% of families and 7.0% of the population were below the poverty line, including 9.9% of those under age 18 and 4.3% of those age 65 or over.

== Economy ==
SHI International and Catalent are headquartered in Somerset.

PIM Brands (Division of The Promotion In Motion Companies and Makers of Welch's Fruit Snacks) operates a manufacturing plant in Somerset.

Meda Pharmaceuticals' U.S. home office is located in Somerset.

Based on 2011 data from the United States Census Bureau, The Washington Post named Somerset County as having sixth-highest median household income of any county in the United States.

== Notable people ==
People who were born in, residents of, or otherwise closely associated with Somerset include:

- Carlton Agudosi (born 1994), wide receiver for the Arizona Cardinals of the NFL
- Anthony Bartholomay (1919–1975), mathematician who introduced molecular set theory
- Upendra J. Chivukula (born 1950), politician who represented the 17th Legislative District in the New Jersey General Assembly, and served on the Franklin Township Council from 1997–2005, serving as its mayor in 2000 and its deputy mayor in 1998
- Margit Feldman (1929–2020), public speaker, educator, activist and Holocaust survivor
- Krystyna Freda (born 1993), footballer who plays as a forward for Cypriot First Division club Apollon Ladies FC
- Roy Hinson (born 1961), first-round draft pick of the Cleveland Cavaliers in 1983 who played for eight seasons in the NBA
- Leeroy Wilfred Kabs-Kanu (born 1954), Sierra Leonean-American reverend, journalist and newspaper publisher who served as Minister Plenipotentiary at the Permanent Mission of Sierra Leone to the United Nations
- Joshua Kuroda-Grauer (born 2003), professional baseball infielder for the Athletics
- Roy E. LaGrone (1922–1993), art director and illustrator, who was a member of the Tuskegee Airmen
- Mekhi Lewis, freestyle and folkstyle wrestler, first NCAA wrestling national champion for Virginia Tech
- Christopher Massimine, former CEO of the National Yiddish Theatre Folksbiene
- Judy Melick (born 1954), former competition swimmer who participated as part of the U.S. team at the 1972 Summer Olympics
- Jeanette Mundt (born 1982), painter, best known for her works in the 2019 Whitney Biennial
- Joe Pace (born 1953), played for the NBA Baltimore/Capital/Washington Bullets from 1972 to 1978
- Randal Pinkett (born 1971), winner of season four of the reality television show, The Apprentice
- Jeff Porter (born 1985), track and field athlete who competes in the 110-meter hurdles and was named as part of the U.S. team at the 2016 Summer Olympics
- Breein Tyree (born 1998), point guard / shooting guard for the Ole Miss Rebels men's basketball team
- Jan Zaprudnik (1926–2022), Belarusian-American historian and publicist, one of the leaders of the Belarusian community in the United States
