= East Jersey Olde Towne Village =

Open-air museum in Piscataway, New Jersey

East Jersey Old Town Village
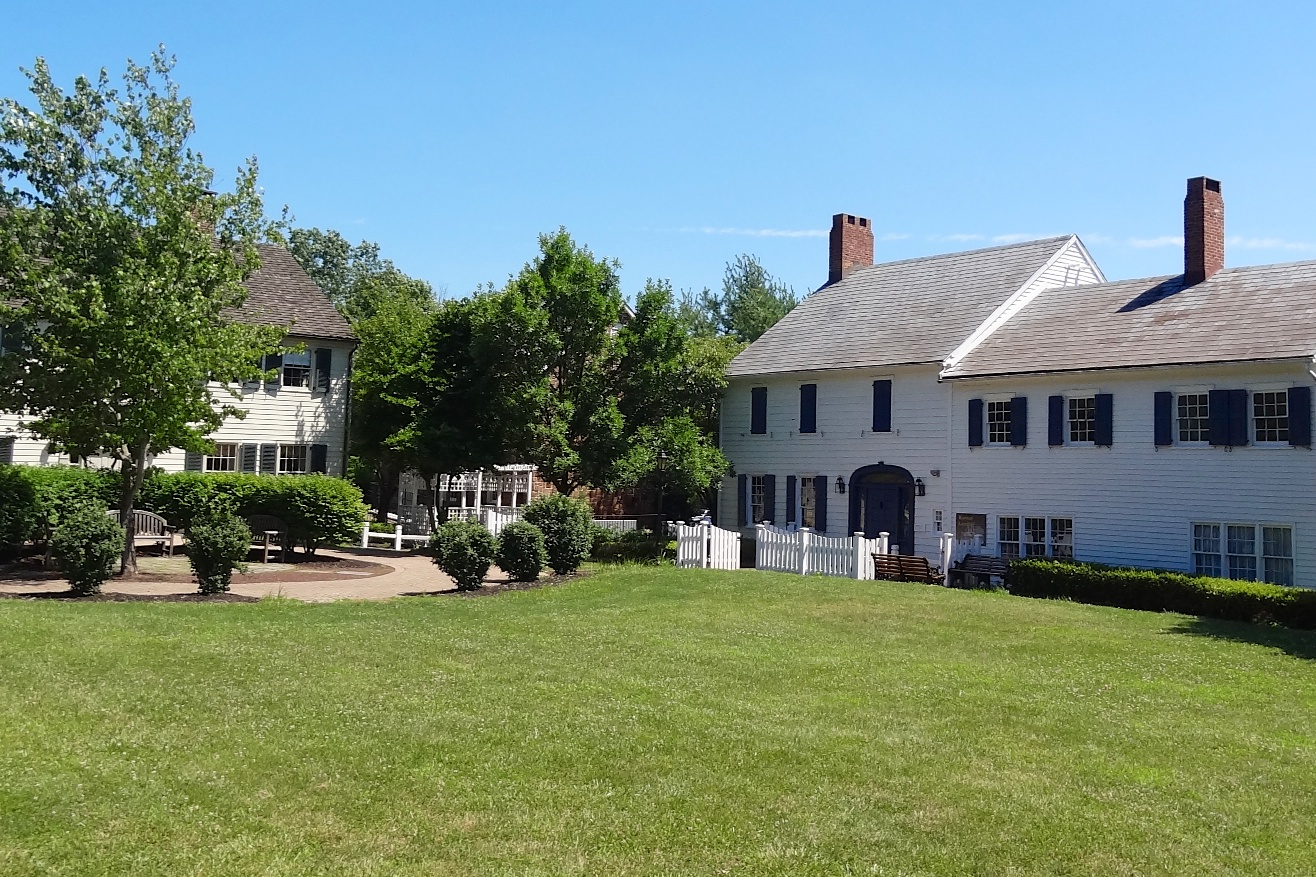
- Courtyard view of the Indian Queen Tavern, the New Brunswick Barracks, and the Runyon House

- Location within Middlesex County, New Jersey
- Location: 1050 River Road; Piscataway, New Jersey
- Coordinates: 40°30′50″N 74°28′36″W

East Jersey Old Town Village (also spelled East Jersey Olde Towne Village) is an open-air museum located in Johnson Park in Piscataway, New Jersey. The Village is a collection of Raritan Valley area historic buildings and includes original, reconstructed, and replicated 18th and 19th century vernacular architecture typical of farm and merchant communities of Central Jersey. It is home to a permanent exhibition about Raritan Landing, an 18th-century inland port once located just downstream on the river. Since 1989, the Middlesex County Office of Arts and History has had responsibility for the village. The village opened in 1978 and contains 16 historic buildings relocated to Johnson Park, representing architectural styles from throughout the Raritan Valley.

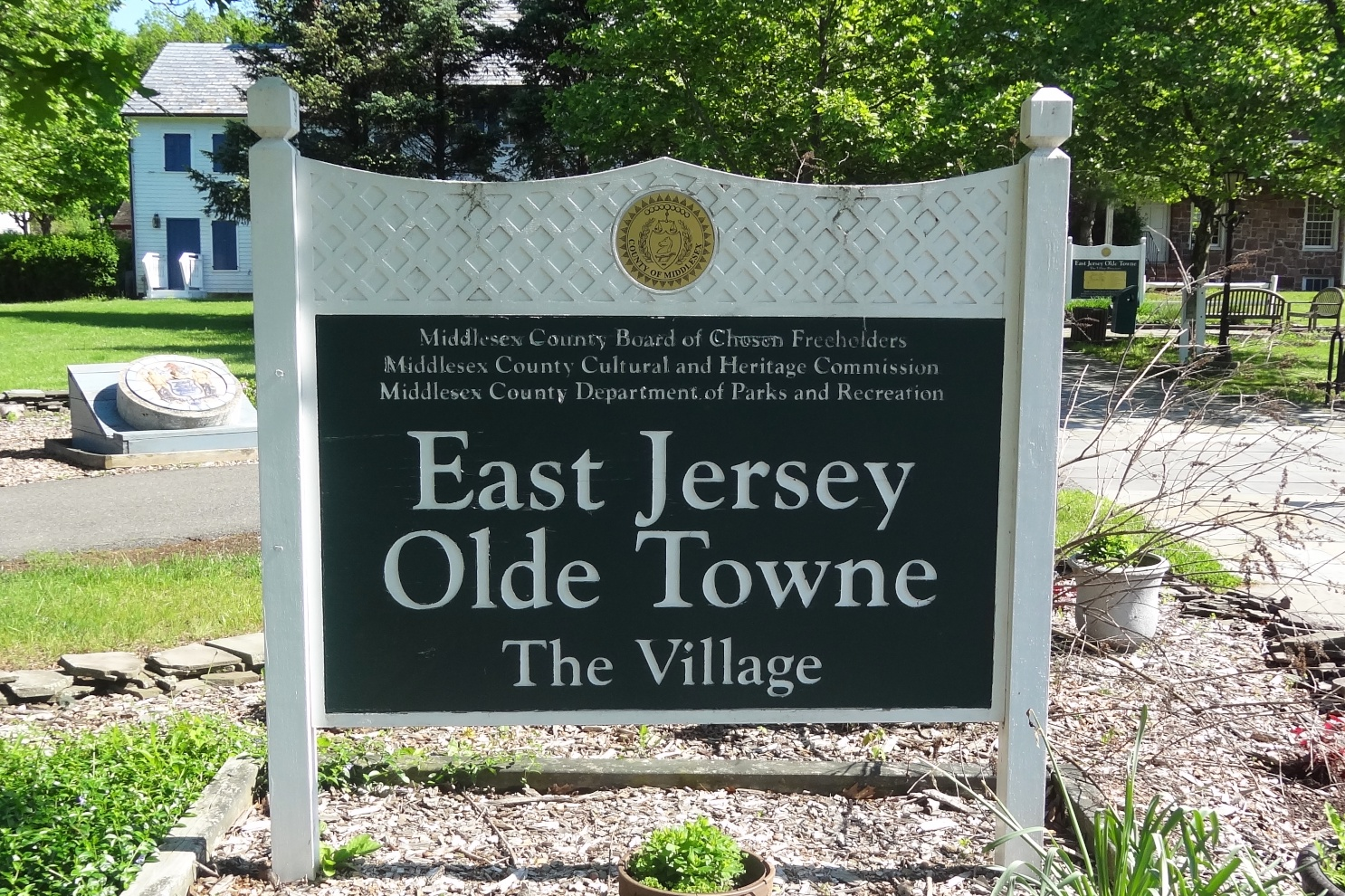
Village entrance sign in 2014

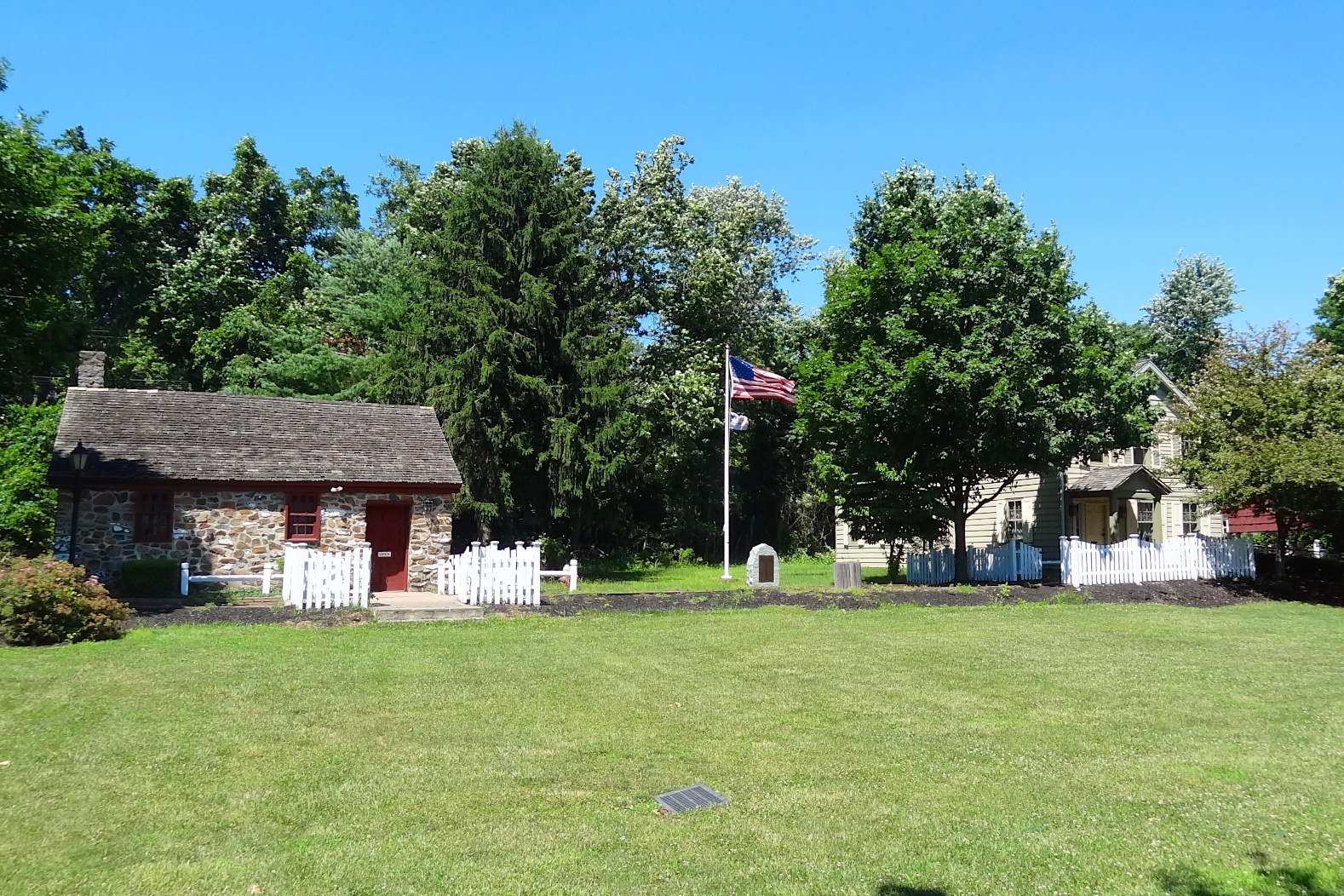
Courtyard view of the Smalleytown Schoolhouse and the Six Mile Run House

== Buildings and original location ==
Name	Image	Date	Original location	Notes
Church of the Three Mile Run		1703	New Brunswick	A 1970s replica of a no longer extant 1703 Dutch Reformed church. The "footprint" of the original building can be seen in the still existing cemetery (along with many early grave markers) in New Brunswick on Route 27 at Hampton Road.
Jeremiah Dunn House		c. 1750	Piscataway	Reconstruction
Pound House		1743	Piscataway	Also known as the Fitzrandolph House.
Indian Queen Tavern		ca 1729	New Brunswick	
New Brunswick Barracks		1758	New Brunswick	A 1970s replica of a portion of a 1758 military barracks located on George St in New Brunswick and destroyed by fire in 1796.
Runyon House		ca 1755	Piscataway	
Six Mile Run House		c. 1760	South Brunswick	Moved from the Six Mile Run area in 1979.
Smalleytown Schoolhouse		1803	Warren Township	
Elias Vanderveer House		c. 1745	Pluckemin	Reconstruction.
Farley Blacksmith Shop		c. 1850	New Brunswick	
Williamson Wheelwright Shop		18th century	North Brunswick	
Runyon Wagon House		c. 1840	Piscataway	

== See also ==
- List of the oldest buildings in New Jersey
- Cornelius Low House
- Metlar-Bodine House
- Ephraim Fitz-Randolph House
- Road Up Raritan Historic District
- Monmouth County Historical Association
- Meadows Foundation (New Jersey)
- New Bridge Landing
- Six Mile Run
- Jacobus Vanderveer House - brother of Elias Vanderveer
