= Raritan Landing, New Jersey =

Populated place in Middlesex County, New Jersey, US

- Unincorporated community
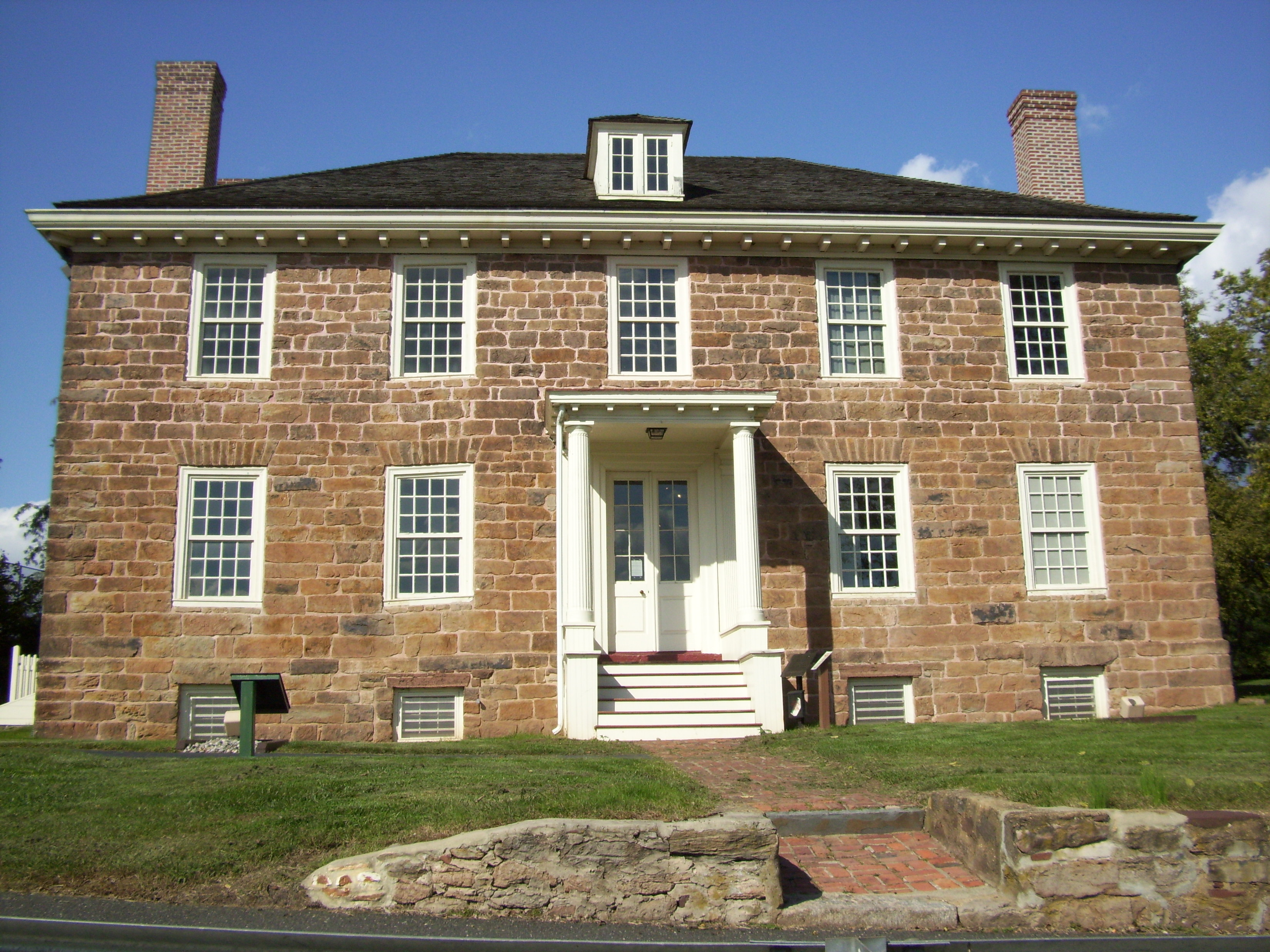
- Cornelius Low House in 2008

- Raritan Landing, Middlesex County, New Jersey Raritan Landing (New Jersey) Raritan Landing (the United States)
- Coordinates: 40°30′38″N 74°27′23″W
- Country: United States
- State: New Jersey
- County: Middlesex
- Township: Piscataway

Raritan Landing is a historical unincorporated community located within Piscataway Township in Middlesex County, in the U.S. state of New Jersey, which was once an inland port, the farthest upstream point ocean-going ships could reach along the Raritan River, across from New Brunswick. Begun in the early 18th century it remained vital until the mid 19th century, when most of the port was abandoned.

The remains of the community now reside buried beneath Johnson Park on the south side of River Road, Remnants of the era, mostly the bluff overlooking the Raritan, include the Cornelius Low House, Metlar-Bodine House, and the Road Up Raritan Historic District and an archaeological site. The nearby East Jersey Olde Towne Village is home to a permanent exhibition about the Raritan Landing.

== History ==
Raritan Landing emerged as a vital port community during the 1720s. It was situated at the farthest inland point on the Raritan River that could be navigated by merchant ships of the day. In its heyday, the Landing was the center for local trade and, along with New Brunswick, served as a hub for imports and exports to and from the Raritan Valley. Agricultural goods and lumber brought to Raritan Landing from throughout central New Jersey were stored in warehouses here, awaiting shipment to either New York or sometimes the Caribbean. Imported goods were off-loaded and taken by traders to stores and merchants throughout the area. The majority of the community existed between present-day River Road and the Raritan River, near the intersection of Landing Lane and River Road. By the 1740s, there were approximately 70 structures and more than 100 inhabitants.

By the early days of the American Revolution the community was occupied by British troops. The bluffs provided safe haven for the troops, and an unobstructed lookout toward New Brunswick, enabling clear views of approaching Patriot forces.

By the 19th century, Raritan Landing's economy dwindled as trade shifted to New Brunswick, establishing the slow death of the community.

== Timeline ==
- c. 1700: Raritan Landing community first occupied.
- c. 1739: Edward Antill House is built.
- 1740: Raritan Landing community included 70 structures and more than 100 inhabitants.
- 1741: Cornelius Low House is built.
- 1825: Landing Lane was lined with blacksmith shops, cooper shops, stores and warehouses.
- 1830: Construction of Delaware and Raritan Canal begins.
- 1834: Delaware and Raritan Canal completed.
- 1870: Most of the community is dismantled and converted to pastureland.
- 1936: Cornelius C. Vermeule, a Piscataway resident, creates a map of Raritan Landing based on his research. The numbers on the map correspond to houses and are keyed to a list of owners included in an article published in the Proceedings of the New Jersey Historical Society. His publication draws others into researching the history of the area. Some of the Vermeule designations are later updated with wills, deeds, newspaper reports, and other paper record.
- 1970s: Cornelius Low House, Metlar-Bodine House, and Road Up Raritan Historic District are added to the New Jersey Register of Historic Places and the National Register of Historic Places

== Raritan Landing Archeological Site ==
- Raritan Landing Archeological District (Boundary Increase)
- U.S. National Register of Historic Places
- New Jersey Register of Historic Places
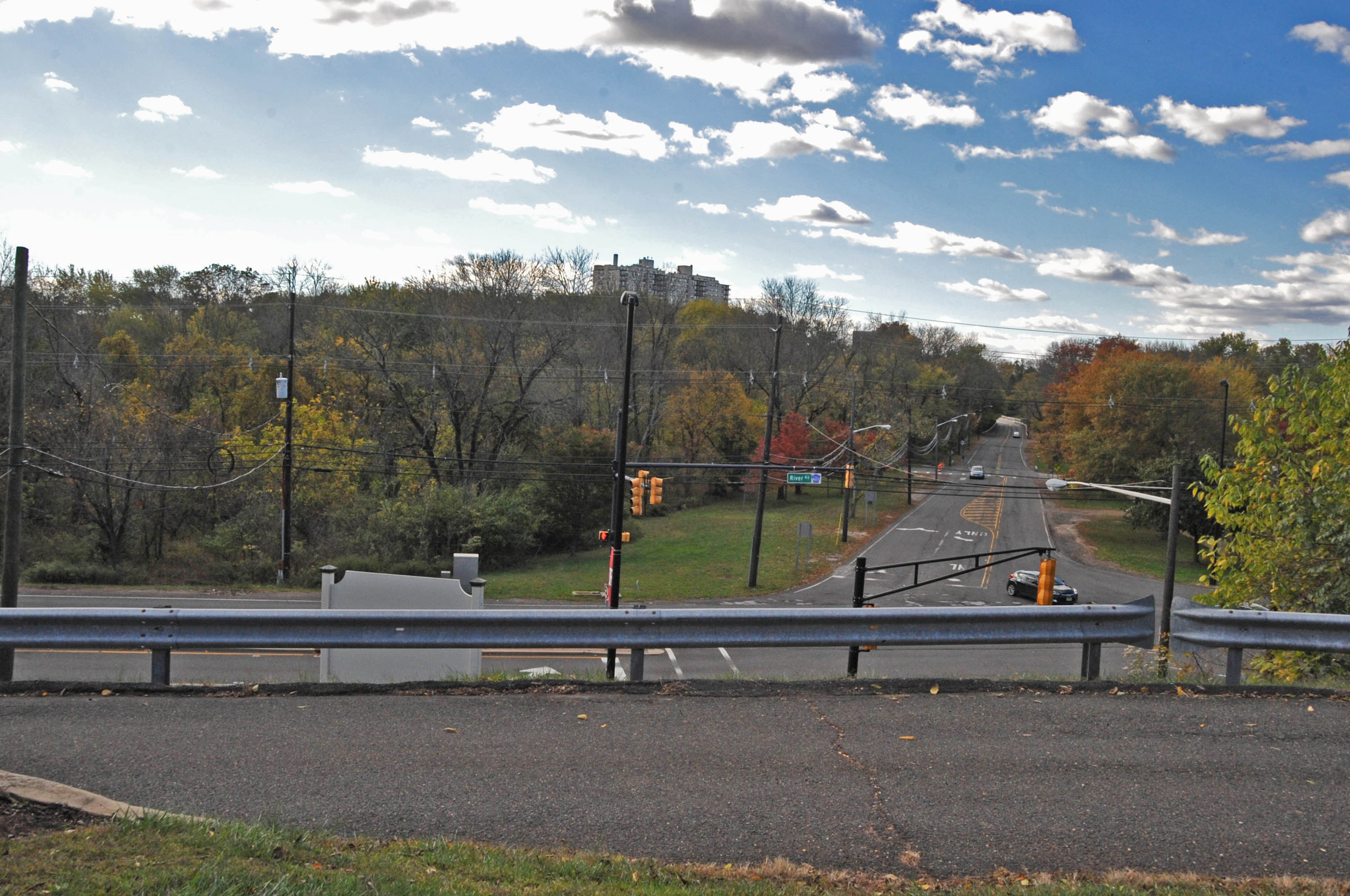
- View from the Cornelius Low House
- Location: Piscataway; Highland Park
- Coordinates: 40°30′45″N 74°27′45″W
- NRHP reference No.: 79001506 (1979); 84002738 (1984)
- NJRHP No.: 1918 (1979); 1921 (1980); 1919 (1984)
- Added to NRHP: October 11, 1984

The Raritan Landing Archeological Site includes the Upper Van Rants House Site, the Bluff Prehistoric Site, and areas just downriver in what has become today's Highland Park as well as in Johnson Park. The site was originally listed in 1979 and expanded in 1984. Work was begun by Rutgers University in 1979 and was continued under the New Jersey Department of Transportation as part of the planned extension of Route 18, planned for completion in 2012. Archaeological excavations at Raritan Landing uncovered artifacts including a Delft tile fragment and a British coin dated 1753.

== Public interpretation ==
Since the 1970s, archaeological excavations at Raritan Landing have uncovered hundreds of thousands of artifacts and building foundations. Geocaching, trivia and augmented-reality activities are used to interpret the site, and an educational guide, Voices from Raritan Landing, has been authored and published by the Middlesex County Division of History and Historic Preservation. The Arts Institute of Middlesex County also has a podcast called Uncovering Raritan Landing.

== See also ==
- List of the oldest buildings in New Jersey
- National Register of Historic Places listings in Middlesex County, New Jersey
- East Jersey Old Town Village
- Six Mile Run
- New Bridge Landing
