= Ross Hall =

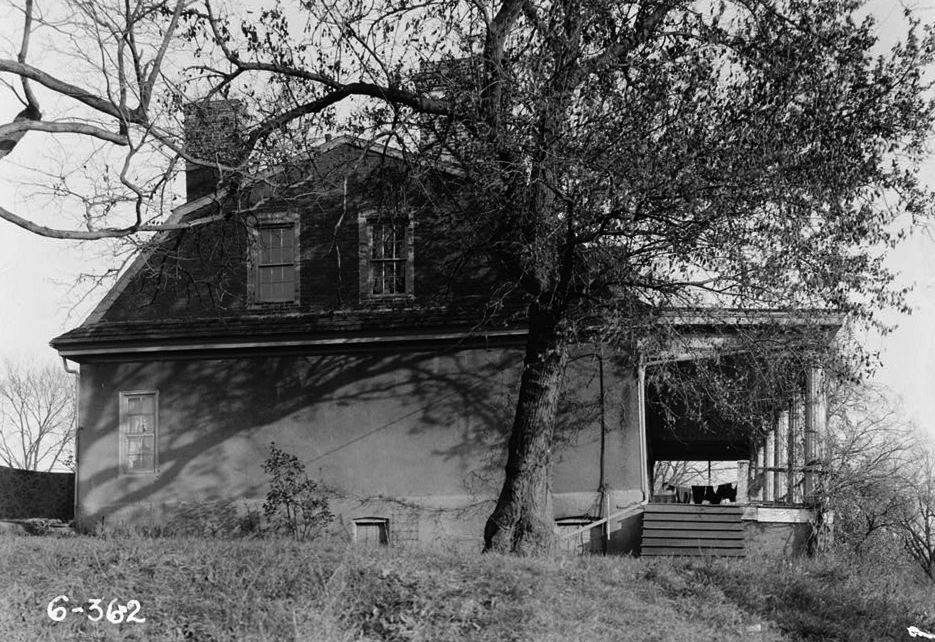
- 1936 HABS Photo

- Location within Middlesex County, New Jersey

General information
- Status: Destroyed
- Location: River Road and Ross Hall Boulevard, Piscataway, New Jersey
- Coordinates: 40°30′39″N 74°26′55″W
- Named for: Dr. Alexander Ross

Ross Hall was a historic colonial farmhouse located on River Road in Piscataway, New Jersey. It was built c. 1739 by Edward Antill and is also known as the Edward Antill House. In 1768, it was purchased by its namesake, Dr. Alexander Ross.

In early July 1778, it was the headquarters for General George Washington when he ordered a feu de joie for the second anniversary of the signing of the Declaration of Independence.

== History ==
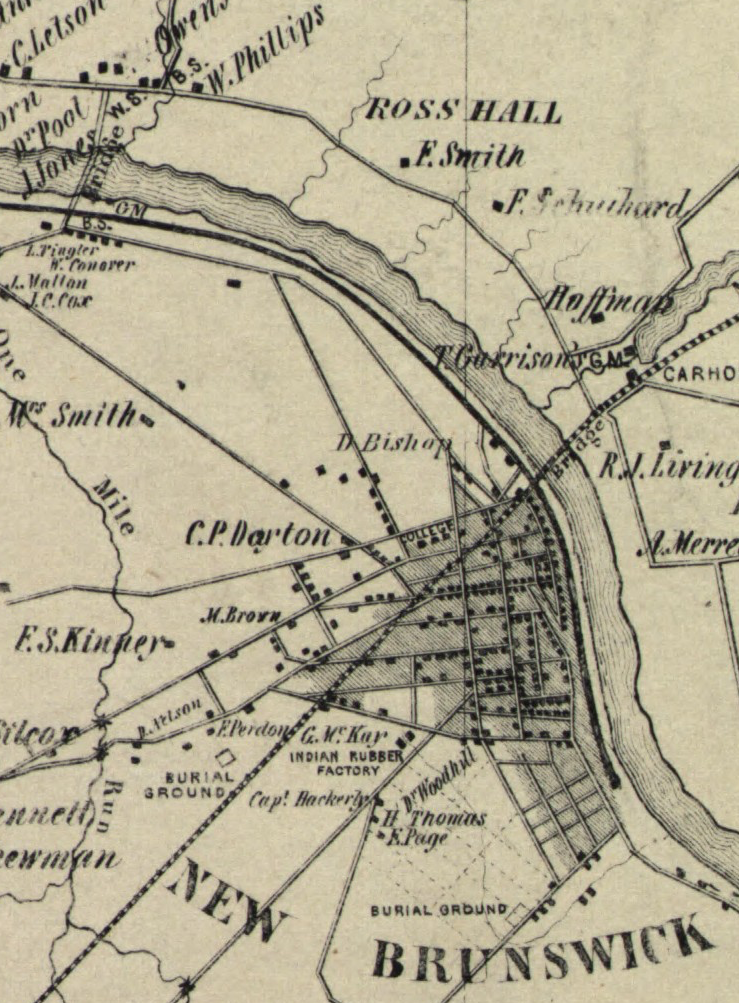
1850 map showing Ross Hall and environs

In 1688, Edward Antill, Esq. acquired several hundred acres near Raritan Landing. His son, Edward Antill (1701–1770), inherited the 370-acre property and built a house here for his family. On June 10, 1739, he married Anne Morris, daughter of Lewis Morris, Royal Governor of New Jersey. Their first child, Sarah, was born here on August 18, 1740. From these events, the house is dated as either late 1739 or early 1740. The other daughter of Morris married Anthony White, who built the nearby Buccleuch Mansion, across the Raritan River, c. 1739.

Antill extensively farmed his property. He had a large apple orchard of 500 trees. The apples were then used for making cider at his distillery.

The property was sold in 1768 to Dr. Alexander Ross (1723–1775), after whom the house is now known. On February 11, 1775, he married Sarah Farmar. He died shortly after their marriage on November 30, 1775. She later married his assistant, Dr. Charles A. Howard, on August 5, 1778.

The house was next purchased by Miles Smith in 1792. In 1880, George W. Metlar bought the property. He also owned the nearby Ivy Hall, now known as the Cornelius Low House. After 1897, Ross Hall was used as the clubhouse for the New Brunswick Golf Club until 1925.

Metlar sold Ross Hall in the 1920s. Rutgers University owned it in the 1950s. It was damaged by fire in 1954 and destroyed in 1957.

== Architecture ==
Ross Hall was a two-story brick house with a stone foundation and a gambrel roof. It was a blend of Georgian and Dutch colonial farmhouse styles.

== Washington headquarters ==
The Battle of Monmouth was fought on June 28, 1778, in extreme heat, with many deaths due to heat stroke. After the battle, General George Washington and the Continental Army marched north to the Raritan River by New Brunswick for cool, fresh water. The army camped on both sides of the river. Washington made his headquarters at Ross Hall, the home of the widow Ross.

== Independence Day parade ==
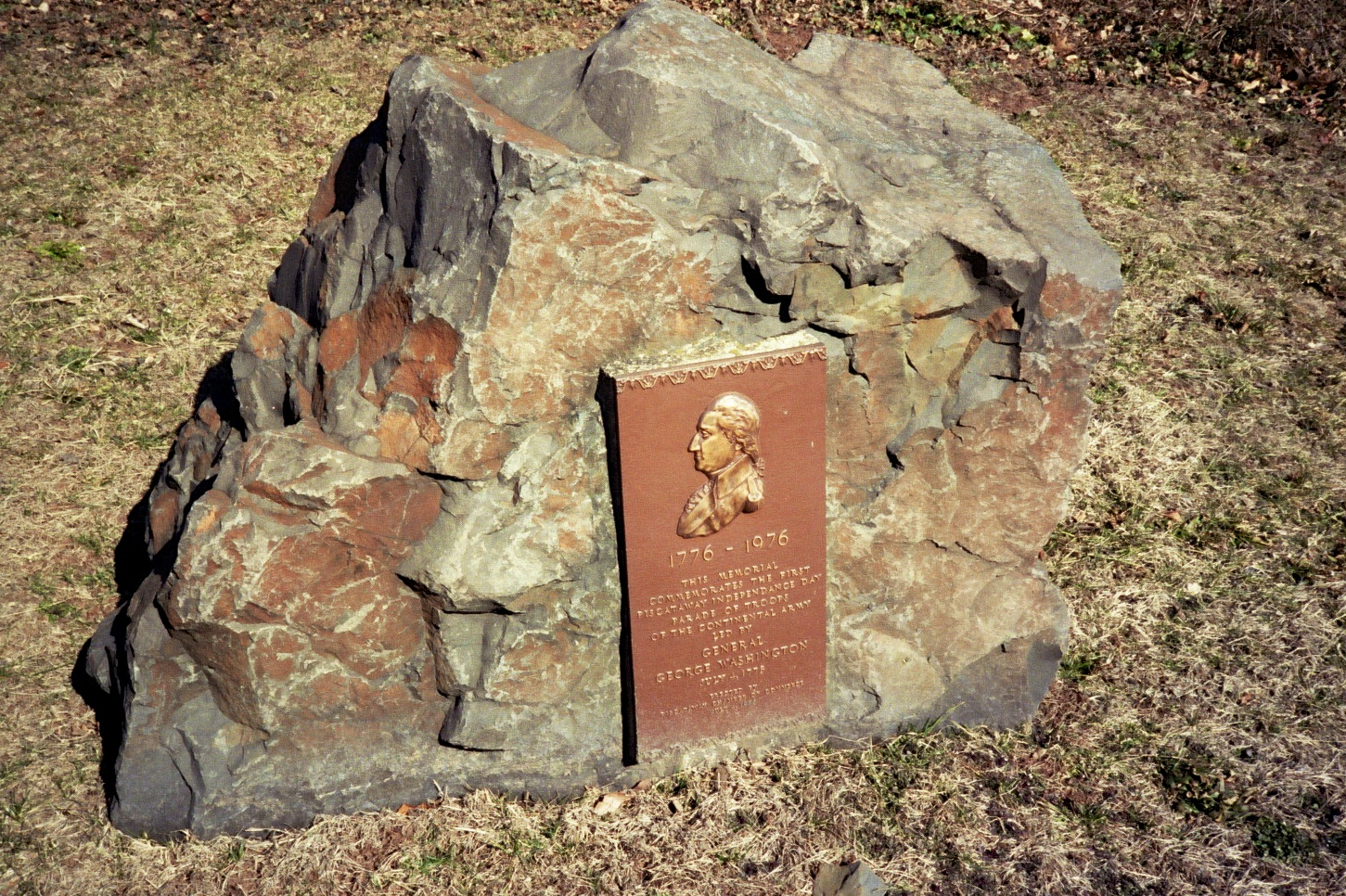
Memorial stone marker for July 4, 1778 parade route.

From his headquarters, Washington ordered a celebration with a feu de joie for the second anniversary of the signing of the Declaration of Independence:

Tomorrow, the Anniversary of the Declaration of Independence will be celebrated by the firing thirteen Pieces of Cannon and a feu de joie of the whole line; the Army will be formed on the Brunswick side of the Rariton at five o'Clock in the afternoon on the ground pointed out by the Quarter Master General. The Soldiers are to adorn their Hats with Green-Boughs and to make the best appearance possible. The disposition will be given in the orders of tomorrow. Double allowance of rum will be served out.

— George Washington, July 3, 1778

The next day, Washington issued more detailed orders for the celebration:

After the Army is formed, upon a signal by order of the Commander in Chief, thirteen Pieces of Cannon will be discharged, after which a single Cannon which will be a signal for a tuning fire to begin on the right of the Army and be continued to the left with Musquetry and Cannon. At the Conclusion of which, on a signal, three Cheers will be given, "Perpetual and undisturbed Independence to the United States of America."

— George Washington, July 4, 1778

A gentleman at camp reported on this celebration:

My situation being high and at a convenient distance in front, afforded me a complete view of the whole, and presented by far the grandest sight I ever beheld. The running fire of musketry is grand of itself, but the cannon throwing out their columns of smoke, and adding their sounds at proper distances, made it magnificent beyond description.

== Legacy ==
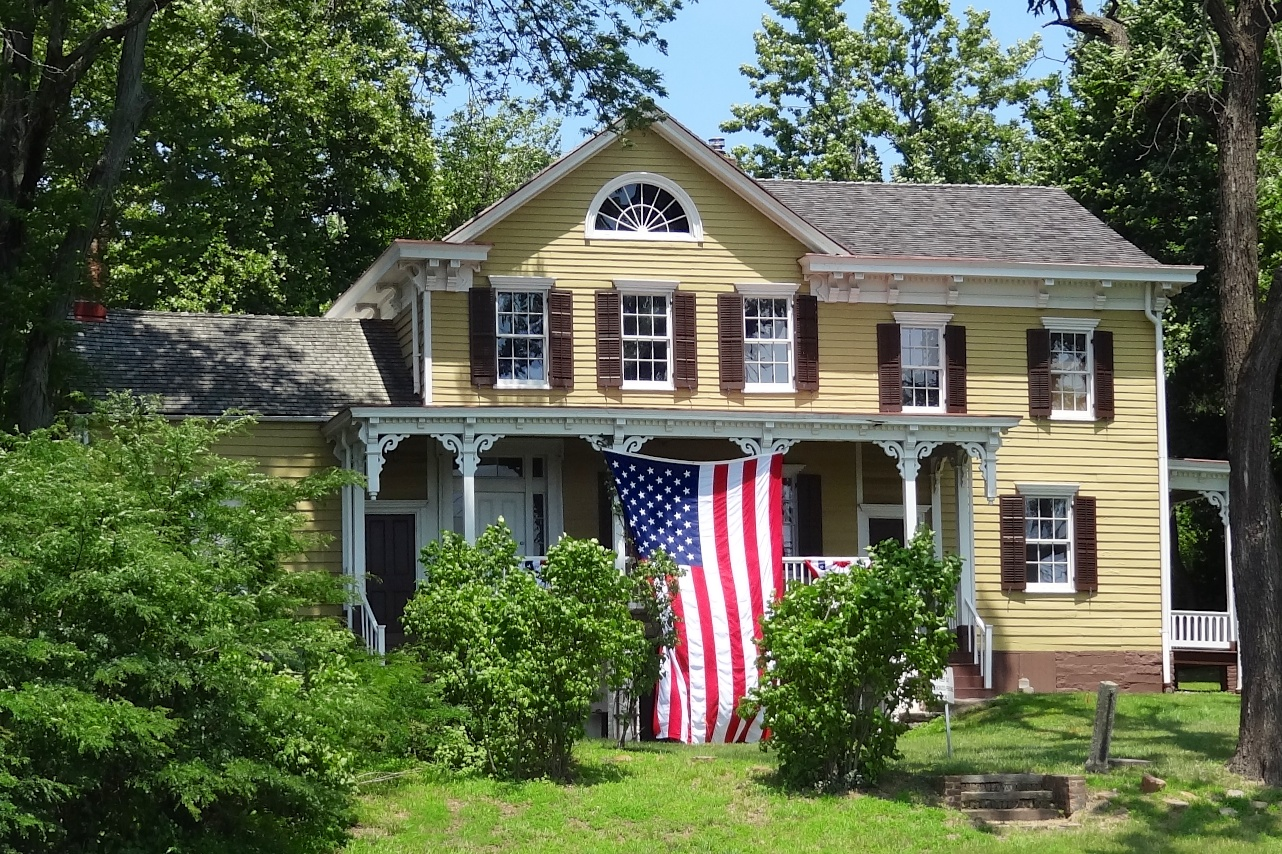
Metlar-Bodine House decorated to celebrate George Washington's stay at Ross Hall

Ross Hall Boulevard in Piscataway is named after the property.

An interior, parlor wall of Ross Hall has been preserved and will be displayed in an educational wing at the nearby Metlar-Bodine House Museum.

On July 4, 1976, a memorial stone was dedicated at the intersection of River Road and Sutphen Road to mark the first Independence Day parade in 1778.

== See also ==
- Edward Antill (1701–1770)
- List of Washington's Headquarters during the Revolutionary War
