= Six Mile Run, New Jersey =

Populated place in Somerset County, New Jersey, US

- Census-designated place
- Location in Somerset County Location in New Jersey Location in the United States
- Coordinates: 40.469914°N 74.532222°W
- Country: United States
- State: New Jersey
- County: Somerset
- Township: Franklin

Area
  - Total: 7.48 sq mi (19.38 km^{2})
  - Land: 7.47 sq mi (19.36 km^{2})
  - Water: 0.0077 sq mi (0.02 km^{2}) 0.10%
- Elevation: 98 ft (30 m)

Population (2020)
  - Total: 3,383
  - Density: 452.6/sq mi (174.74/km^{2})
- Time zone: UTC−05:00 (Eastern (EST))
  - Summer (DST): UTC−04:00 (Eastern (EDT))
- Area codes: 609/640 and 732/848
- FIPS code: 34-67820
- GNIS feature ID: 02584028

Six Mile Run is an unincorporated community and census-designated place (CDP) located in Franklin Township, in Somerset County, in the U.S. state of New Jersey. As of the 2020 census, Six Mile Run had a population of 3,383.

== Geography ==
According to the United States Census Bureau, Six Mile Run had a total area of 7.484 square miles (19.383 km^{2}), including 7.476 square miles (19.363 km^{2}) of land and 0.008 square miles (0.020 km^{2}) of water (0.10%).

== Demographics ==
Historical population
Census	Pop.	Note	%±
2010	3,184		—
2020	3,383		6.3%
Population sources: 2010

Six Mile Run first appeared as a census designated place in the 2010 U.S. census.

=== Racial and ethnic composition ===
Six Mile Run CDP, New Jersey – Racial and ethnic composition Note: the US Census treats Hispanic/Latino as an ethnic category. This table excludes Latinos from the racial categories and assigns them to a separate category. Hispanics/Latinos may be of any race.
Race / Ethnicity (NH = Non-Hispanic)	Pop 2010	Pop 2020	% 2010	% 2020
White alone (NH)	1,038	807	32.60%	23.85%
Black or African American alone (NH)	1,044	1,038	32.79%	30.68%
Native American or Alaska Native alone (NH)	2	3	0.06%	0.09%
Asian alone (NH)	752	868	23.62%	25.66%
Native Hawaiian or Pacific Islander alone (NH)	0	0	0.00%	0.00%
Other race alone (NH)	5	29	0.16%	0.86%
Mixed race or Multiracial (NH)	59	85	1.85%	2.51%
Hispanic or Latino (any race)	284	553	8.92%	16.35%
Total	3,184	3,383	100.00%	100.00%

=== 2020 census ===
As of the 2020 census, Six Mile Run had a population of 3,383. The median age was 39.1 years. 21.1% of residents were under the age of 18 and 13.9% of residents were 65 years of age or older. For every 100 females there were 89.4 males, and for every 100 females age 18 and over there were 90.0 males age 18 and over.

62.3% of residents lived in urban areas, while 37.7% lived in rural areas.

There were 1,196 households in Six Mile Run, of which 32.5% had children under the age of 18 living in them. Of all households, 51.7% were married-couple households, 16.7% were households with a male householder and no spouse or partner present, and 26.2% were households with a female householder and no spouse or partner present. About 21.7% of all households were made up of individuals and 7.7% had someone living alone who was 65 years of age or older.

There were 1,249 housing units, of which 4.2% were vacant. The homeowner vacancy rate was 0.0% and the rental vacancy rate was 6.6%.

=== 2010 census ===
The 2010 United States census counted 3,184 people, 1,152 households, and 820 families in the CDP. The population density was 425.9 per square mile (164.4/km^{2}). There were 1,218 housing units at an average density of 162.9 per square mile (62.9/km^{2}). The racial makeup was 37.00% (1,178) White, 33.86% (1,078) Black or African American, 0.19% (6) Native American, 23.62% (752) Asian, 0.00% (0) Pacific Islander, 2.73% (87) from other races, and 2.61% (83) from two or more races. Hispanic or Latino of any race were 8.92% (284) of the population.

Of the 1,152 households, 37.8% had children under the age of 18; 53.8% were married couples living together; 12.1% had a female householder with no husband present and 28.8% were non-families. Of all households, 22.7% were made up of individuals and 4.7% had someone living alone who was 65 years of age or older. The average household size was 2.76 and the average family size was 3.31.

25.5% of the population were under the age of 18, 7.6% from 18 to 24, 31.2% from 25 to 44, 29.0% from 45 to 64, and 6.8% who were 65 years of age or older. The median age was 36.3 years. For every 100 females, the population had 93.2 males. For every 100 females ages 18 and older there were 90.4 males.

== Historic district on the National Register of Historic Places ==
- Six Mile Run Historic District
- U.S. National Register of Historic Places
- U.S. Historic district
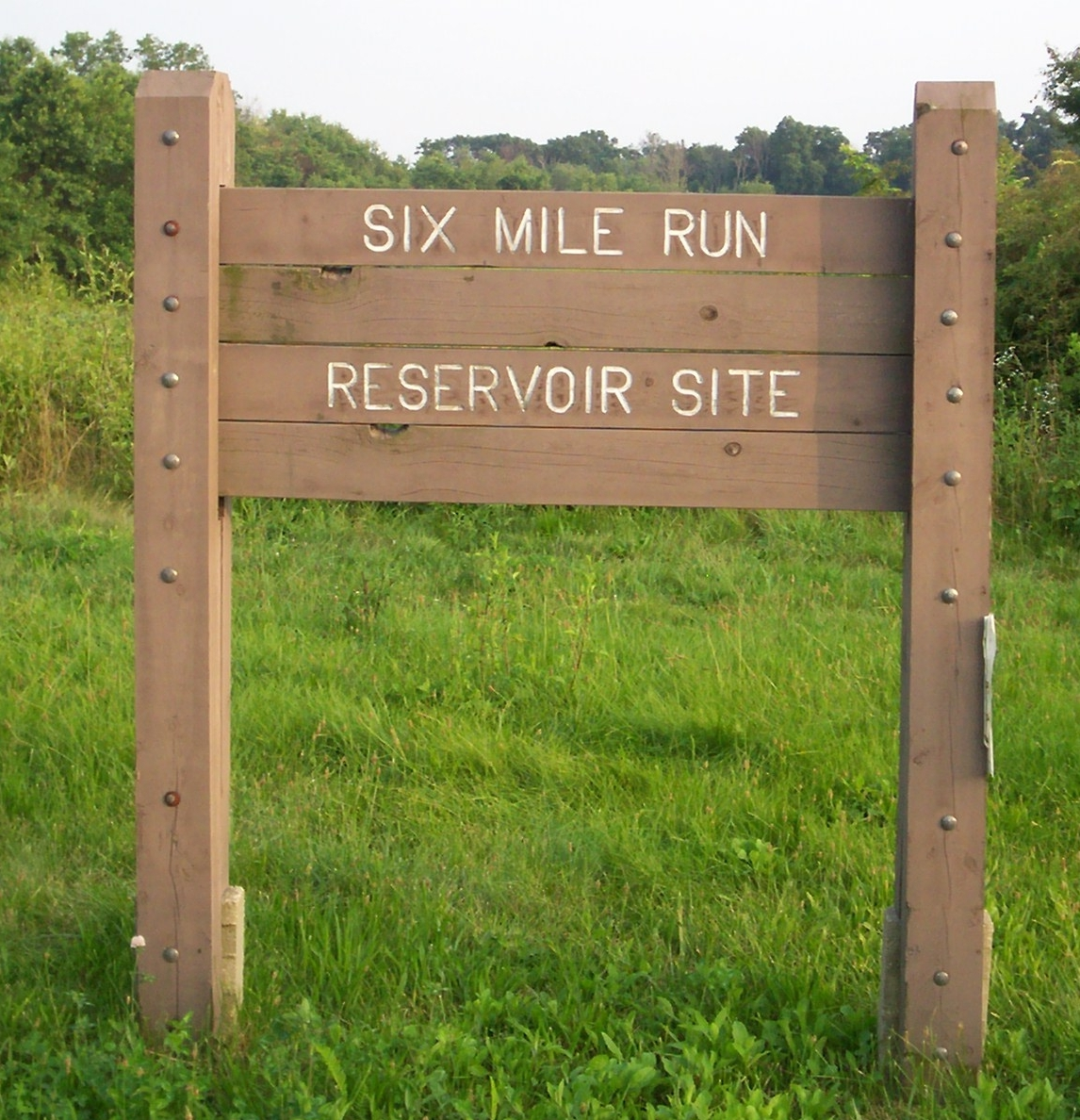
- Six Mile Run Reservoir Site

- Location within Somerset County, New Jersey
- Location: Franklin Township, New Jersey
- Area: 64,450 acres (260.8 km^{2})
- NRHP reference No.: 95001191
- Added to NRHP: October 25, 1995

The National Register of Historic Places defines the Six Mile Run Historic District as roughly bounded by Grouser Road, Amwell Road, Bennetts Lane, New Jersey Route 27, a diagonal line from the bridge at Six Mile Run to South Middlebush Road at Claremont, Butler Road and the Millstone River. It includes a portion of the Delaware and Raritan Canal and the Six Mile Run Canal House that are separately listed on the National Register. It contains 149 contributing buildings, 5 contributing sites and 44 contributing structures.

Examples of Six Mile Run Historic District contributing buildings are the three Meadows Foundation maintained properties listed here:

- Van Liew-Suydam House, 280 South Middlebush Road. It was built in the 18th century by Peter Van Liew. Joseph Suydam later built the part of the house that is visible today. The newest and largest portion of the house was built in 1875. Although the most recent long term owner of the house was named French, the house has been named after its two initial owners.
- Hageman Farm, 209 South Middlebush Road
- Wyckoff-Garretson House, 215 South Middlebush Road

== Historic village name ==
Six Mile Run is the historic name for an unincorporated community located within portions of North Brunswick Township and South Brunswick Township in Middlesex County and Franklin Township in Somerset County, in New Jersey. Route 27 (historically known as Old Road/King's Highway and once part of the Lincoln Highway system) bisects the village and serves as the dividing line between the two counties. The name of the settlement was formally changed from Six Mile Run to Franklin Park on June 25, 1872.

== Six Mile Run Reformed Church ==
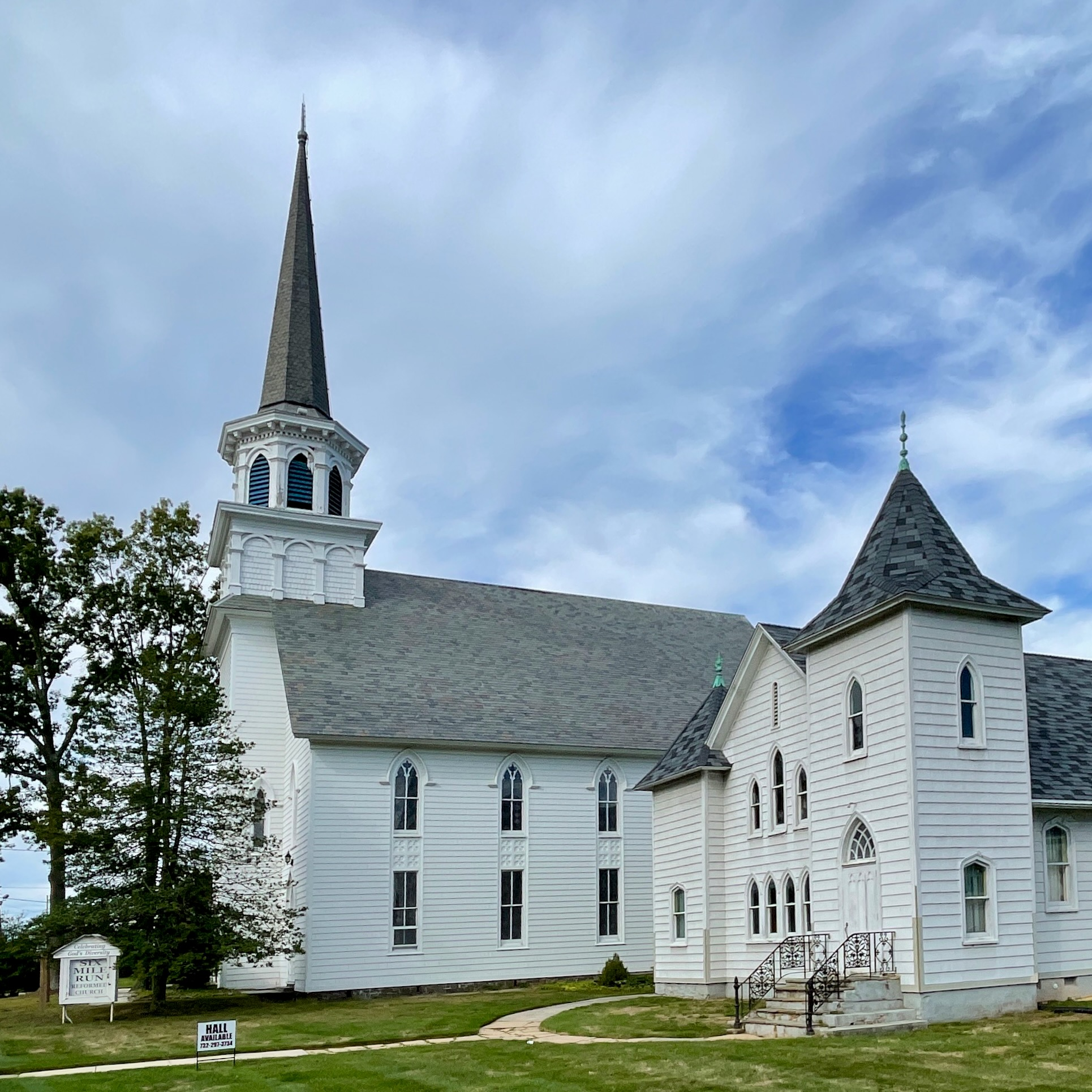
Six Mile Run Reformed Church and Chapel

In 1710, a congregation of the Dutch Reformed Church (now the Reformed Church in America) formed the Six Mile Run Reformed Church. The first building was replaced by a new building in 1766 and was later replaced in 1817 by a third structure on the same site. The current building replaced the 1817 church that was destroyed by fire in 1879. The Frelinghuysen Memorial Chapel was added in 1907 and the Fellowship Hall was dedicated in 1958.

== Six Mile Run Reservoir ==
The proposed Six Mile Run Reservoir Site is adjacent to the Delaware and Raritan Canal and included a large portion of the Six Mile Run Watershed in central Franklin Township. In 1970, the land for the reservoir was acquired by the State through the New Jersey Department of Environmental Protection, Division of Water Resources as a future reservoir and recreation area and included many of the properties later listed as contributing to the Six Mile National Register Historic District. The reservoir was never built, and in 1993 administration of the area was transferred to the Division of Parks and Forestry.

== Six Mile Run Reservoir section of the Delaware and Raritan Canal State Park ==
Today the Six Mile Run Reservoir site is maintained as a State Park and includes several trails that are used primarily by mountain bikers, hikers, and horseback riders. It has 8 miles (13 km) of twisting single track maintained by JORBA. Access to the park can be found at the large parking lot on Canal Road near Six Mile Run Road, from the parking lot of the private soccer club on Route 27, and from several smaller parking areas on roads that traverse the park.

Because part of the land at the site was taken out of cultivation 39 years ago, the process of "old field succession" has now yielded up trees and foliage that are unique among state park lands. In the section between Canal Road and South Middlebush Road, there are postings describing the foliage and the natural process. The "Red Dot" hiking trail, which runs between Canal Road and South Middlebush Road, has now been extended from South Middlebush Road up to NJ Route 27. There is a new White Trail, not fully blazed but very usable, running from a left fork off Red Dot near South Middlebush Road, to a parking lot off Jacques Lane.

== See also ==
- Three Mile Run, New Jersey, now incorporated into New Brunswick, New Jersey
- Ten Mile Run, New Jersey

== Sources ==
- Brahms, William B., Franklin Township, Somerset County, NJ: A History, Franklin Township Public Library, 1998; ISBN 0-9668586-0-3
