= Metlar–Bodine House =

Historic house in New Jersey, United States

- Metlar House
- U.S. National Register of Historic Places
- New Jersey Register of Historic Places
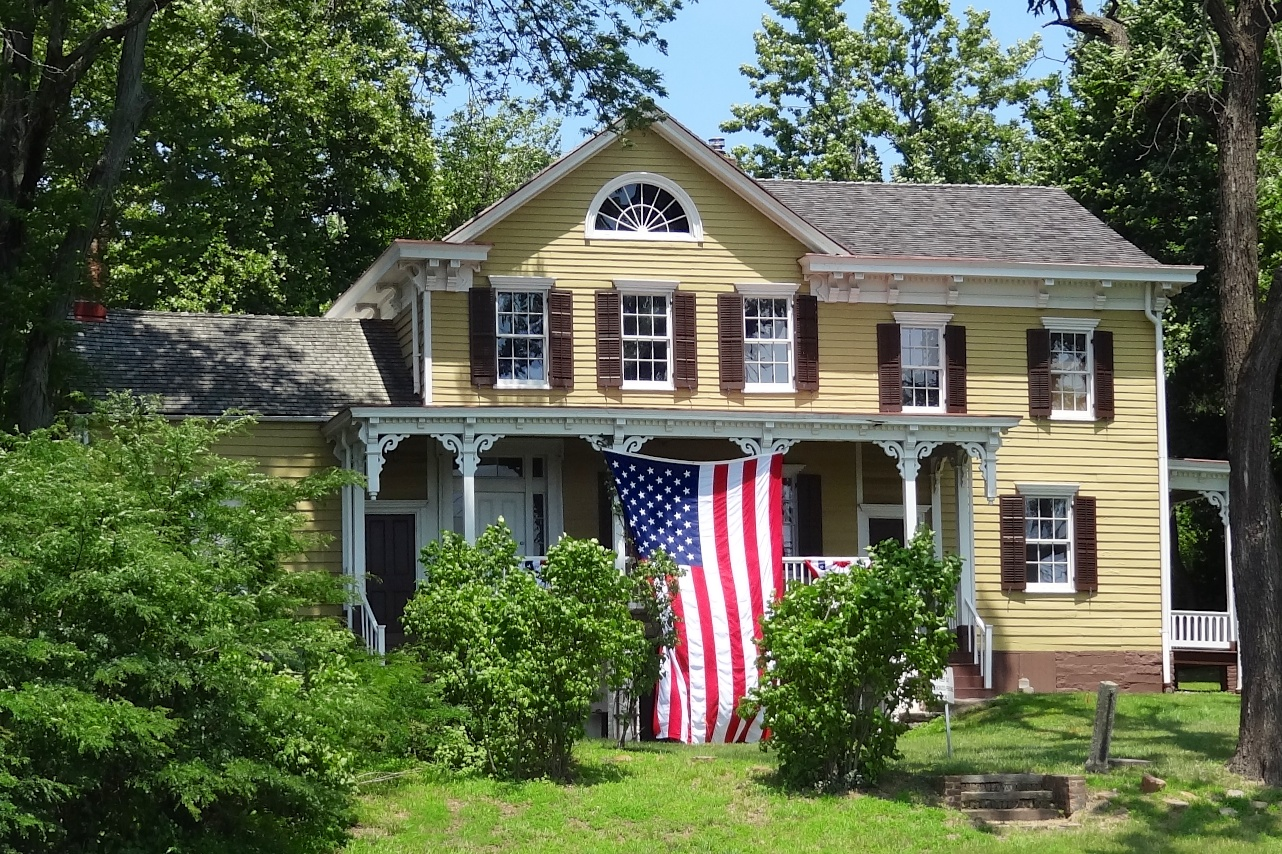
- Metlar–Bodine House Museum

- Location within Middlesex County, New Jersey Location within New Jersey Location within the United States
- Location: 1281 River Road, Piscataway, New Jersey
- Coordinates: 40°30′45″N 74°27′25″W
- Area: 0.7 acres (0.28 ha)
- Built: 1728
- NRHP reference No.: 73001115
- NJRHP No.: 1916

Significant dates
- Added to NRHP: March 7, 1973
- Designated NJRHP: August 7, 1972

The Metlar House, also known as the Knapp House, the Bodine House, or the Metlar–Bodine House, is an historic house, now museum, located along River Road in Piscataway, New Jersey. It is also believed to be haunted. In 2003 a fire badly damaged the house. The museum has undergone major renovations over the past decade and, as of Summer 2014, is once again open to the public.

The Metlar–Bodine House's "Red, White, and Boom" Madeira wine tasting event on July 6, 2014, kicked off its campaign to raise money to build a new educational wing to house the historically significant Ross Hall Wall.

In July 1778, George Washington headquarters were at Ross Hall and his 11,000 patriots camped along the Raritan River in Piscataway. It was there that General Washington wrote the first order for the United States Army to celebrate the 4th of July – a tradition that continues to this day. The troops were ordered to march across the river on Landing Lane Bridge, line the banks of the Raritan in New Brunswick, and shoot their rifles down and up the line in the first organized salute to the nation's independence. They were then given an extra ration of rum and that evening the General had a party for officers (including Alexander Hamilton, the Marquis de Lafayette and Baron Von Stuben) and their ladies at Ross Hall. The building was destroyed in the 1960s but because of its significance, a parlor wall was saved and was exhibited at the New Jersey Historical Society until it was given to the Township and the Metlar–Bodine House in 2000.

Currently, the parlor wall is dismantled and stored in a large warehouse owned by Piscataway Township. The wall must be restored and relocated to a facility that is climate controlled and protected. It is estimated that the wall's restoration and an addition to the Metlar–Bodine House will cost close to $1 million.

== History ==
Peter Bodine lived in Raritan Landing, New Jersey during the early 1700s. New owners of his property and renovations occurred leading up to the early 1900s. Since then, Metlar–Bodine House became a New Jersey Department of Transportation property.

On July 17, 2003, a fire damaged the house.

== Annual Events ==
Spring Annual Auction Dinner

Summer Annual Beer & Pretzel Potluck Picnic (members only)

Bi-annual Antiques River Road Show- Appraisal Fair & Book Sale

Fall Wine Tasting

Holiday Tea

== See also ==
- National Register of Historic Places listings in Middlesex County, New Jersey
- Cornelius Low House
- Road Up Raritan Historic District
- Ross Hall
- List of the oldest buildings in New Jersey
