= Feu de joie =

Celebratory gunfire

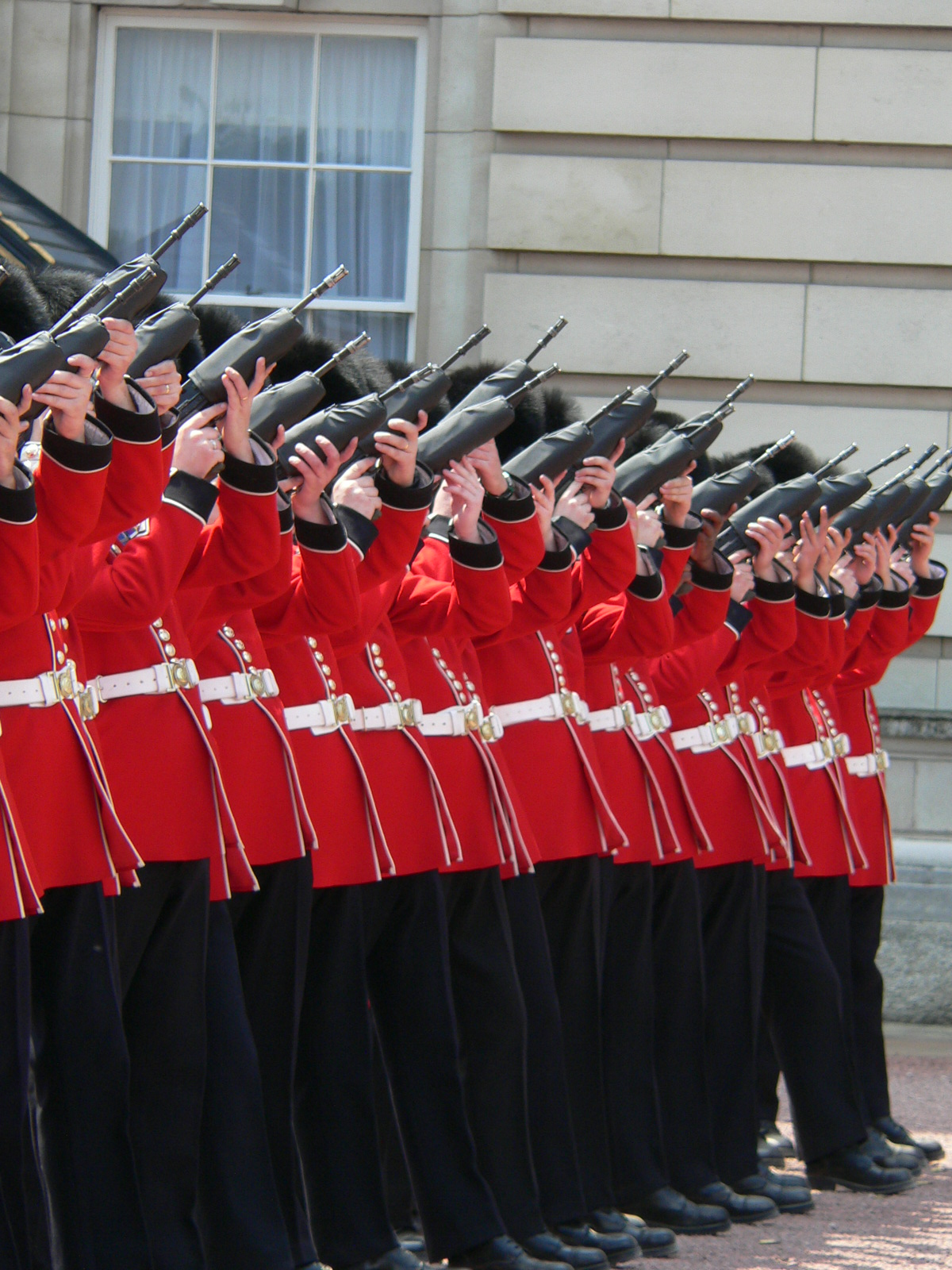
Preparing to fire the feu de joie, for the 80th Birthday of Queen Elizabeth II, 17 June 2006

A feu de joie (literally "fire of joy" in French) is a form of formal celebratory gunfire consisting of a celebratory rifle salute, described as a "running fire of guns." As soldiers fire into the air sequentially in rapid succession, the cascade of blank rounds produces a characteristic "rat-tat-tat" effect. It is used on rare landmark occasions of national rejoicing. During the 18th and 19th centuries, a feu de joie has celebrated a military victory or birthday. In recent years, it has marked, in royal presence, the 80th birthday and the Diamond Jubilee of Queen Elizabeth II. Feux de joie also mark annual national or army days in Canada, Malta, Nepal and Singapore.

== Historical examples ==
=== Alliance with France: Valley Forge, 1778 ===
A spectacular feu de joie ran up and down double lines of infantrymen at Valley Forge, Pennsylvania, on 6 May 1778 to celebrate the alliance between the newly independent United States of America with France.

The men were placed in specified positions to fire a feu de joie with muskets and cannon—three times three discharges of thirteen cannon. At the first the army huzzaed, "Long live the King of France"; at the second, "Long live the friendly European powers"; and at the third there was a shout, "The American States."

=== Independence Day parade: 4 July 1778 ===
From his headquarters at Ross Hall, General George Washington ordered a feu de joie to celebrate the anniversary of the signing of the Declaration of Independence.

Tomorrow, the Anniversary of the Declaration of Independence will be celebrated by the firing thirteen Pieces of Cannon and a feu de joie of the whole line; the Army will be formed on the Brunswick side of the Rariton at five o'Clock in the afternoon on the ground pointed out by the Quarter Master General. The Soldiers are to adorn their Hats with Green-Boughs and to make the best appearance possible. The disposition will be given in the orders of tomorrow. Double allowance of rum will be served out.

— George Washington, July 4, 1778

=== A Dauphin is born: West Point, 1782 ===
In May 1782 a feu de joie at West Point celebrated the birth of the Dauphin of France, and was witnessed by a Dr. Thacher.

The arbor was, in the evening, illuminated by a vast number of lights, which, being arranged in regular and tasteful order, exhibited a scene vying in brilliancy with the starry firmament. The officers having rejoined their regiments, thirteen cannon were again fired as a prelude to the general feu-de-joie, which immediately succeeded throughout the whole line of the army on the surrounding hills, and being three times repeated, the mountains resounded and echoed like tremendous peals of thunder, and the flashing from thousands of firearms in the darkness of the evening, could be compared only to the most vivid flashes of lightning from the clouds. The feu-de-joie was immediately followed by three shouts of acclamation and benediction for the Dauphin by the united voices of the whole army on all sides.

The same event was also recollected by Captain Eben Williams:

At a given signal, a running fire began at the south end of the line and extended along the west side of the river to the north end, when the feu-de-joie was caught by the troops on the opposite side of the river and carried south. Thus did the rattle of musketry three times make its distant circuit along the Hudson . . . .

=== British take possession of Hong Kong, 1841 ===
On Tuesday 26 January 1841, west of the centre of the north shore of Hong Kong Island, British sailors and Marines - under Commodore James John Gordon Bremer of HMS Calliope - went ashore to claim the island for Britain. They gave 'three cheers', drank their queen's health, raised the British flag and gave forth a feu de joie, on the spot that became known as 'Possession Point'. Today, the site is marked by Hollywood Road Park. In commemoration of this, a feu de joie was also performed by massed units of the Royal Navy, Royal Air Force and the Black Watch during the handover ceremony and parade held on 30 June 1997.

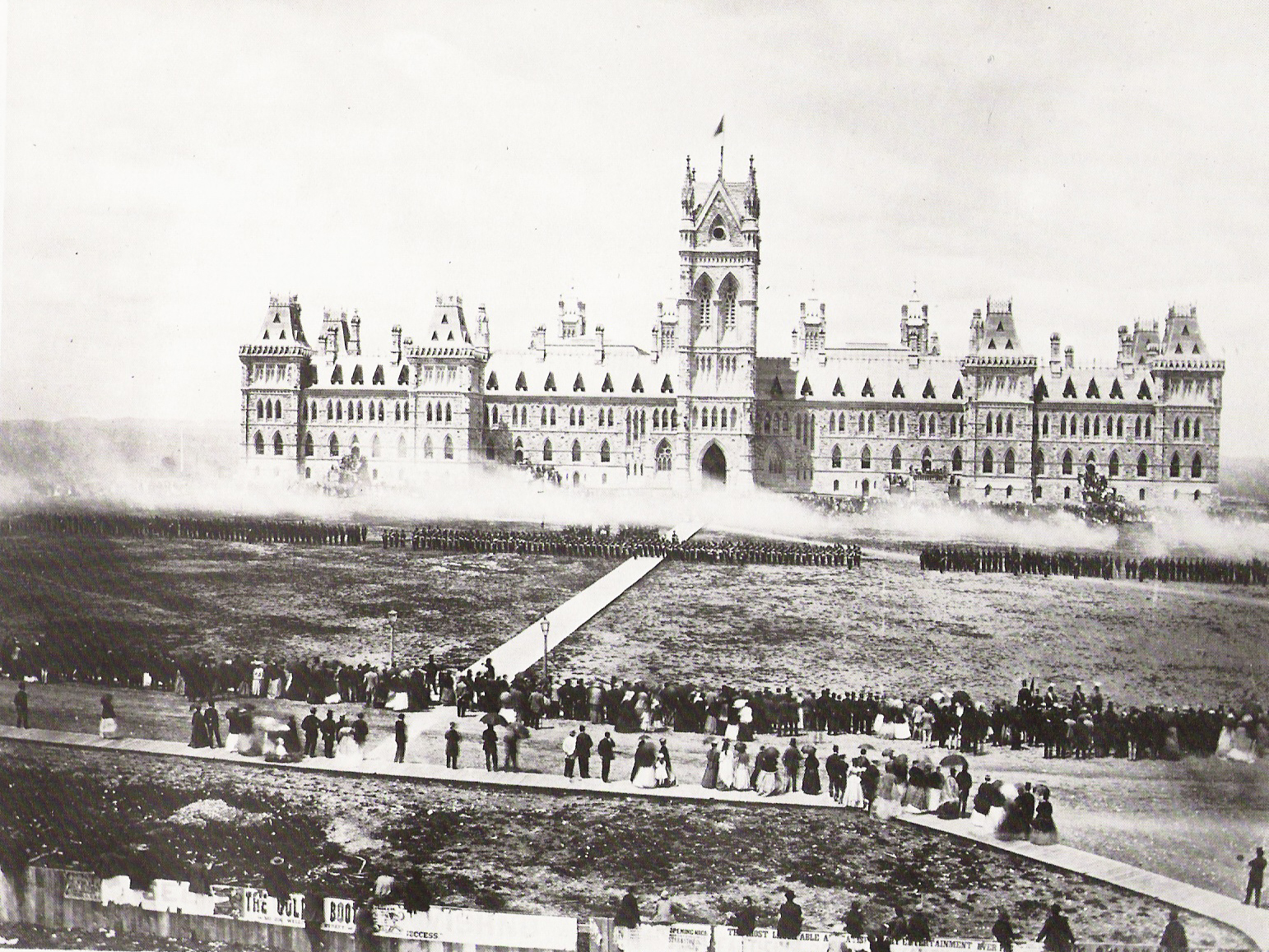
Troops deliver a feu de joie on Parliament Hill in Ottawa, Ontario, Canada in 1868 in celebration of Queen Victoria's birthday

=== Empress of India proclamation: Delhi, 1877 ===
In his book The King's Shilling, Gordon Johnson Walker remembered how the feu-de-joie was incorporated into the annual ceremony held on the first day of every New Year when the reigning Monarch was proclaimed ‘Emperor of India’. This was known as the Proclamation Parade - "Each soldier had a blank cartridge, which, on the command, he would load into his rifle and fire a salute known as a 'feu-de-joie', which set the seal on the proceedings."

Queen Victoria's proclamation as Empress of India in Delhi on 1 January 1877 was followed by a feu de joie described by Field Marshal Lord Roberts.

A salute of one hundred and one salvos of artillery was fired, with a feu-de-joie from the long line of troops. This was too much for the elephants. As the feu-de-joie approached nearer and nearer to them, they became more and more alarmed, and at last scampered off, dispersing the crowd in every direction.

=== Delhi Coronation Durbar for George V, 1911 ===
At the 1911 Delhi Coronation Durbar of King George V, a feu de joie followed the 101-Gun Salute during the State Entry ceremony on 12 December 1911.

=== Coronation of Elizabeth II, 1953 ===
Numerous feux de joie were performed to commemorate the Coronation of Queen Elizabeth on 2 June 1953. These ranged from elaborate ceremonies at home and in Europe, to a "combat" feu de joie in Korea.

== 21st century ==
=== United Kingdom ===
Feux de joie have marked occasions of national rejoicing. These often take place on the Forecourt of Buckingham Palace, in the presence of the Royal Family.

==== Queen Elizabeth II 80th birthday ====
As part of Elizabeth II's 80th birthday celebrations, a feu de joie occurred on the Forecourt of Buckingham Palace on 17 June 2006 following the RAF flypast after Trooping the Colour. This was the first feu de joie during the queen's reign to be performed in her presence.

Rounds were fired by the Old Guard, the New Guard and six Half Companies of Street-Liners in the Forecourt of the Palace. The gunfire was interspersed with the National Anthem, God Save the Queen. After the feu de joie the troops on the Forecourt laid down their weapons, removed their headgear and gave "Three Cheers for Her Majesty The Queen".

==== Queen Elizabeth II Diamond Jubilee ====
On 5 June 2012, a weekend of celebrations for the Diamond Jubilee of Elizabeth II culminated in a feu de joie given at Buckingham Palace. This followed a Service of Thanksgiving at St Paul's Cathedral, reception at Mansion House, a luncheon given in her honour by the Livery at Westminster Hall, and a balcony appearance with flypast by the Red Arrows and historic aircraft, including the last flying Lancaster bomber in Britain.

==== Royal Air Force Centenary: "RAF 100" ====
On 10 July 2018, this was officially celebrated with a service at Westminster Abbey, attended by the Royal Family. The Queen presented a new Queen's Colour to the Royal Air Force. Then followed a historic flypast of 100 aircraft over Buckingham Palace, watched by the Royal Family from the Palace balcony and an estimated 70,000 people on The Mall and in surrounding streets and Royal Parks. The celebrations culminated in several feux de joie fired on the Forecourt of the Palace, interspersed with sections of the National Anthem as on the Queen's 80th birthday.

=== Canada ===
A feu de joie is performed at various celebratory occasions, such as when the Governor General was hosting Their Royal Highnesses The Duke and Duchess of Cambridge on the occasion of the presentation of the Queen Elizabeth II Cup.

The Royal Military College of Canada also performs a feu de joie on the annual graduation parade where the graduates are commissioned. The feu de joie is performed with 500 C7 rifles on average.

At the Cadet Summer Training Centre Blackdown, as well as Cadet Summer Training Centre Vernon, cadets from the Alpha and Foxtrot Companies (Drill & Ceremonial Instructor Course) perform a feu de joie in the camp's annual "Sunset Ceremony." This is performed with Lee–Enfield No.4 rifles.

=== Malta ===
The Armed Forces of Malta performs a feu de joie on Republic Day.

=== Nepal ===
The Nepal Army performs a feu de joie as part of the Army Day celebrations that coincide with the Hindu festival of Mahashivaratri. The feu de joie is generally performed using the 1A1 Self Loading Rifle (SLR), a variant of the L1A1 Self-Loading Rifle, manufactured in India.

The venue of the celebrations is the Nepal Army Pavilion in Tundikhel, a relatively large open space in the city center is the venue of the Army Day celebration and the events there in.

=== Poland ===
The firing of the threefold feu de joie (salwa honorowa in Polish) is done mainly in Poland by formations of the armed forces and uniformed groups during funerals of veterans and important persons, more akin to a three-volley salute as a form of national gratitude to their service, and on the following dates:

- 8 February, Prison Service Day
- 1 March, National "Cursed Soldiers" Remembrance Day
- 24 March, anniversary of the Kościuszko Uprising
- 10 April, anniversary of the Smolensk air disaster
- 13 April, Katyn Memorial Day
- 2 May, Flag Day
- 3 May, 3 May Constitution Day
- 8 May, Victory Day
- 16 May, Border Guards Day
- 14 June, National Day of Remembrance of Nazi Concentration Camps Victims
- 24 July, Police Day
- 1 August, Warsaw Uprising National Remembrance Day
- 15 August, Armed Forces Day
- 1 September, Veterans' Day and anniversary of the outbreak of the Second World War and the Battle of Westerplatte
- 27 September, Day of the Polish Underground State
- 11 November, National Independence Day
- 13 December, Martial Law Victims Remembrance Day
- On the anniversaries of the liberation of towns and cities from the Axis Powers in the Second World War

The firing party is either platoon, half company or company sized formation holding either the SKS, AKM, FB Beryl or MSBS rifle from the Polish Armed Forces or other civil uniformed organizations.

=== Singapore ===
The Guards-of-Honour (GOH) from the four Singapore Armed Forces services (the Singapore Army, Republic of Singapore Navy, Republic of Singapore Air Force, and Digital and Intelligence Service), together with their counterparts from the Singapore Police Force and Singapore Civil Defence Force, perform the feu-de-joie as a standard element of the country's National Day celebrations on 9 August every year. This is carried out before the GOH marches past the president's reviewing-stand out from the parade. The tradition began in the 1980 edition as a way to celebrate the first 15 years since Singapore's independence, and became a regular tradition starting in 1989.

== See also ==
- Celebratory gunfire
