= Wyckoff–Garretson House =

Historic house in New Jersey, United States

Coordinates: 40.484217°N 74.536467°W

- U.S. Historic district – Contributing property
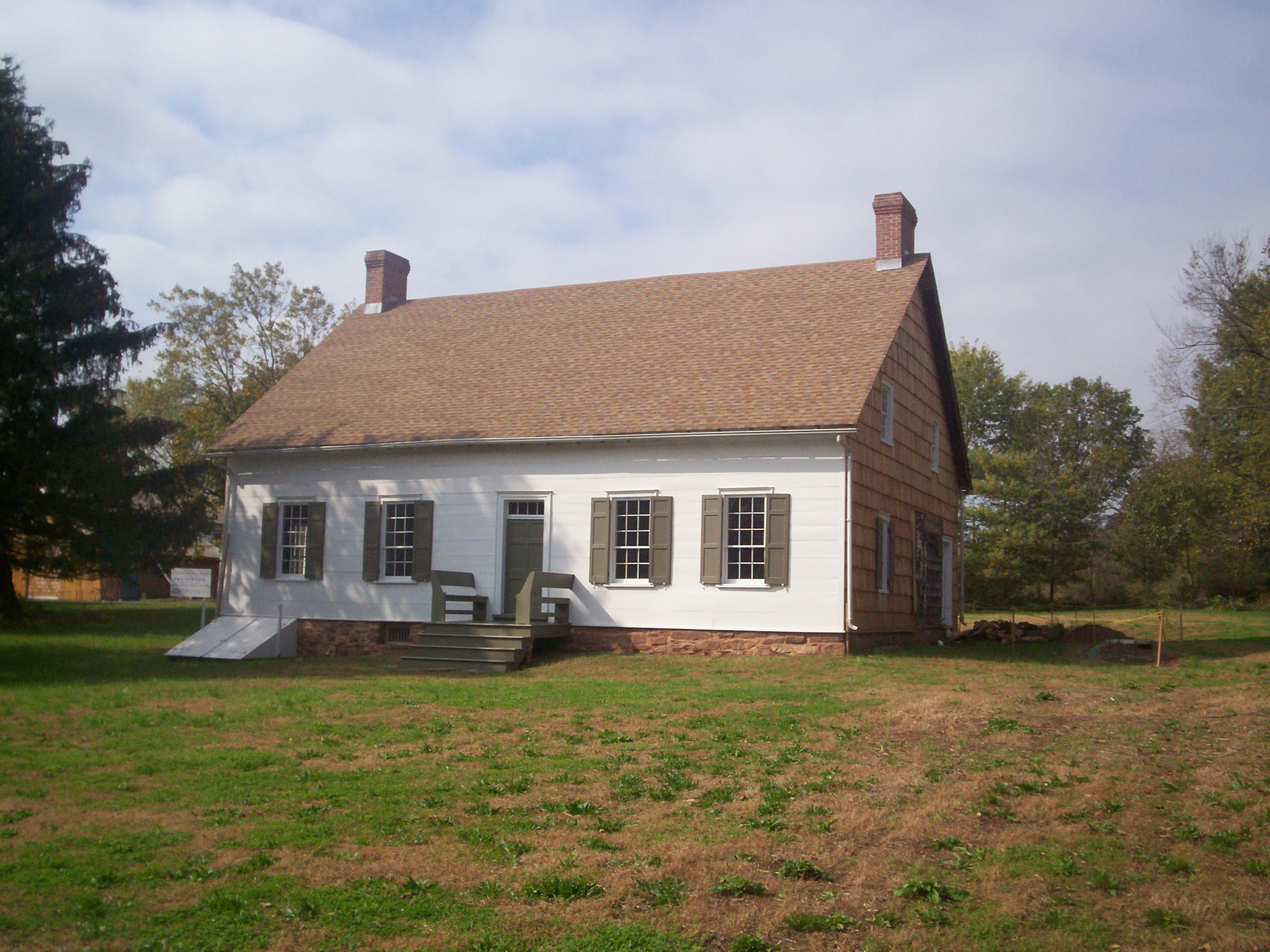
- Wyckoff-Garretson House in 2006
- Part of: Six Mile Run Historic District (ID95001191)
- Designated CP: October 25, 1995

The Wyckoff–Garretson House is a historic house located at 215 South Middlebush Road, Somerset, New Jersey, which was built in 1730 by Cornelius Wyckoff. It is a contributing property of the Six Mile Run Historic District, added to the National Register of Historic Places on October 25, 1995.

== Cornelius Wyckoff ==
Cornelius Wyckoff was the son of Pieter Claesen Wyckoff. He moved to Franklin Township, Somerset County, New Jersey, in 1701. In collaboration with seven other Dutch farmers, they bought 10,000 acres (40 km^{2}). Cornelius' portion was 1,200 acres (5 km^{2}) which was divided for his four sons: John Wyckoff, Jacob Wyckoff, Peter Wyckoff, and Simon Wyckoff.

John was the first of the sons to occupy the land, near Middlebush, New Jersey, sometime before 1711. In 1730, he built the first half of the house bringing in Dutch craftsmen from Brooklyn and using white oak.

The house was later enlarged by Samuel Garretson from Hillsborough, New Jersey, in 1805. It is currently being restored by the Meadows Foundation.

== Cemetery ==
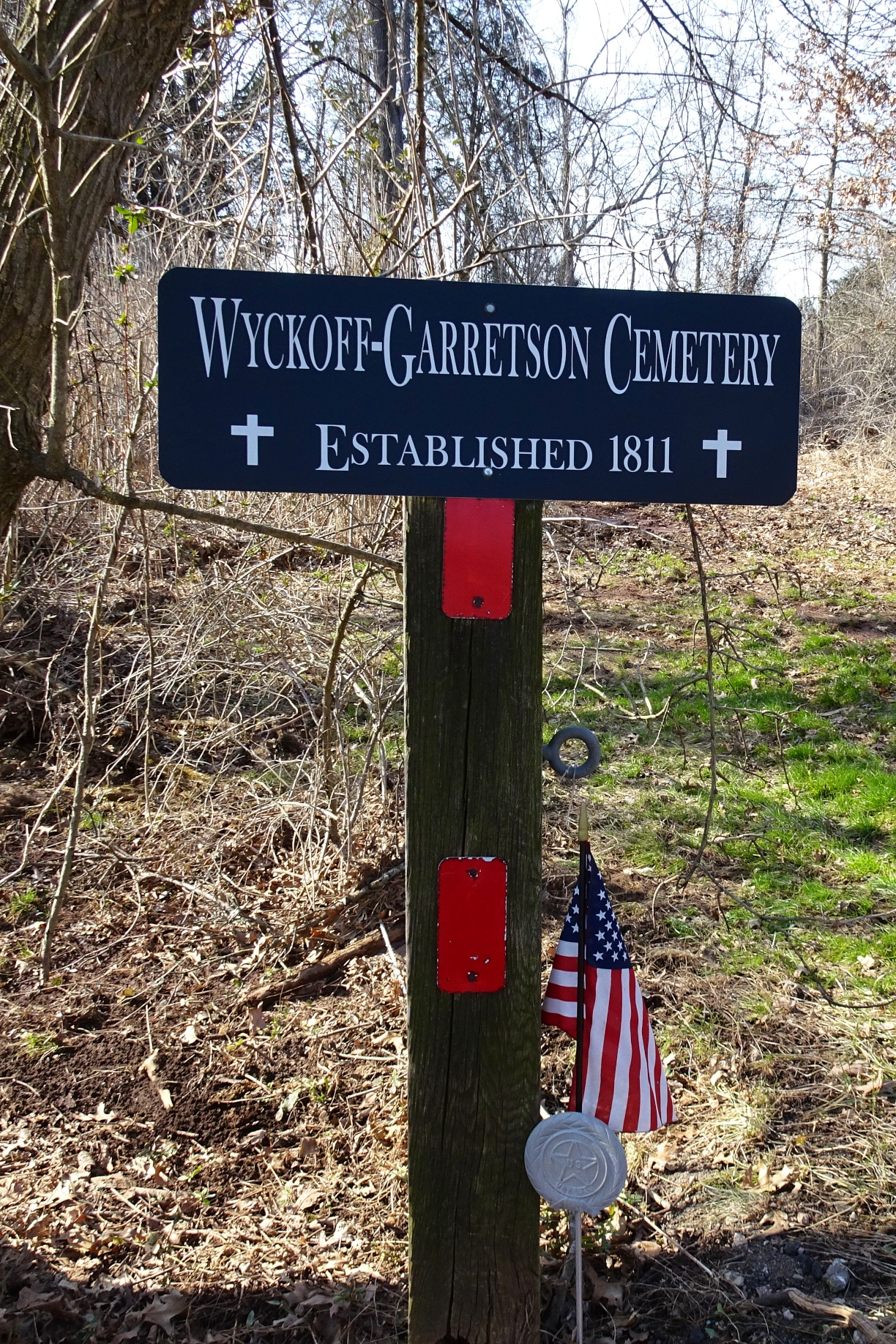
Cemetery information sign

The nearby Wyckoff–Garretson Cemetery, also known as the South Middlebush Cemetery, was established in 1811. It is also a contributing property.
