= Wyckoff House =

Historic house in Brooklyn, New York

- U.S. National Register of Historic Places
- U.S. National Historic Landmark
- New York City Landmark
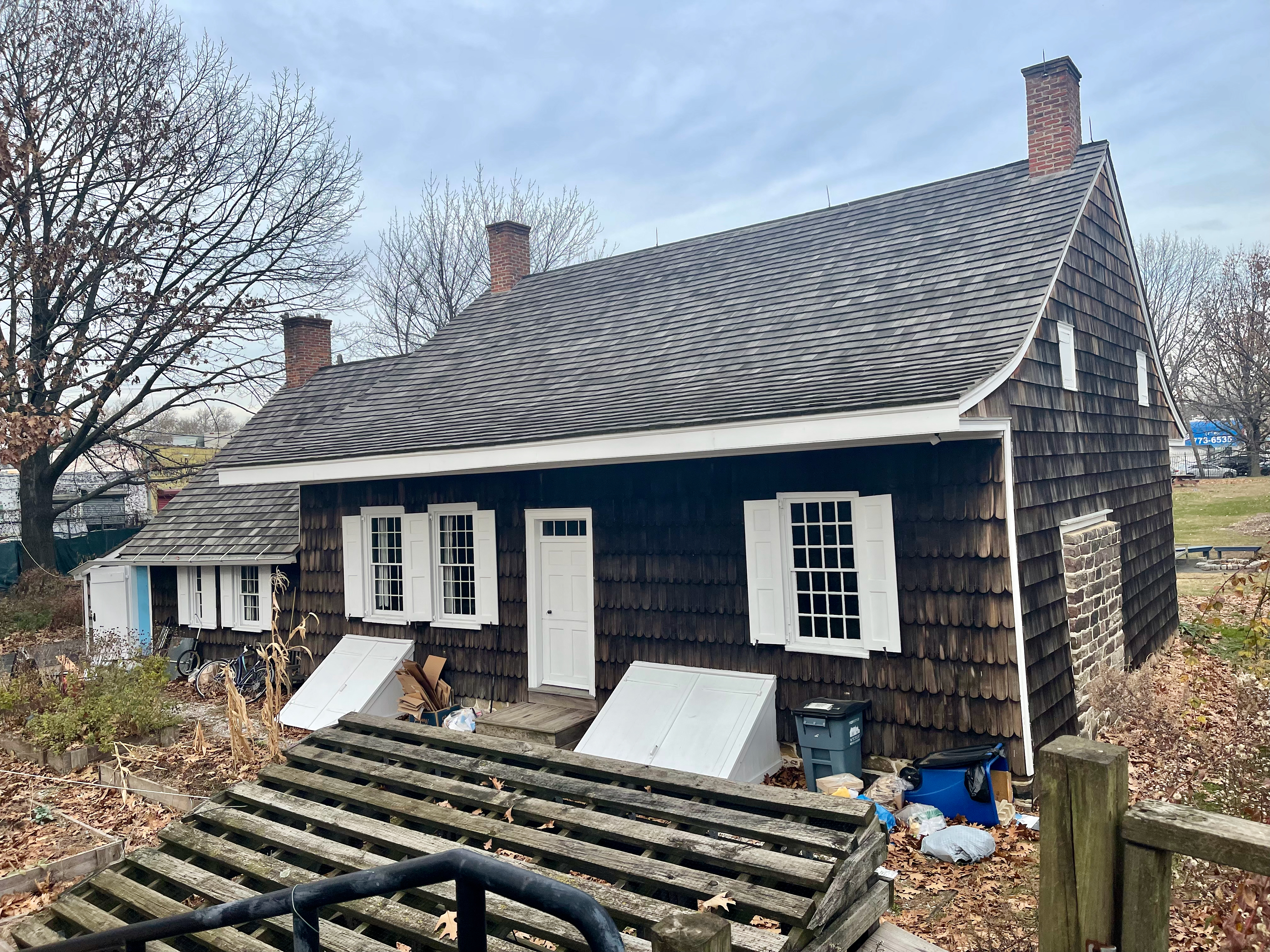
- Part on the left dates to the 19th century, part on the right is of the 18th century

- Location within New York City Location within New York Location within the United States
- Location: 5816 Clarendon Road (Milton Fidler Park), Brooklyn, NY
- Coordinates: 40°38′40″N 73°55′15″W
- Built: 1652 (dated via dendrochronology)
- Architectural style: Colonial
- Website: Official website
- NRHP reference No.: 67000013
- NYCL No.: 0001

Significant dates
- Added to NRHP: December 24, 1967
- Designated NHL: December 24, 1967
- Designated NYCL: October 14, 1965

The Wyckoff House, or Pieter Claesen Wyckoff House, is a historic house at 5816 Clarendon Road in the East Flatbush neighborhood of Brooklyn in New York City, within Milton Fidler Park.

It is situated on land that New Netherland director general Wouter van Twiller purchased from the Lenape natives in approximately 1636. The house was one of several that Van Twiller ordered to be built before he was recalled to the Netherlands by 1640. It is estimated to have been built before 1641. Pieter Claesen Wyckoff's family moved in around 1652. The house is one of the oldest surviving examples of a Dutch frame house in America, and it was one of the first structures built by settlers on Long Island. The majority of the current structure was added in the 19th century, with the small kitchen section dating back to the 18th century.

It is owned by New York City but is operated by The Wyckoff House & Association. It was declared a National Historic Landmark in 1967 and is a New York City designated landmark. The Wyckoff House Museum operates numerous programs, including a community gardening apprentice program for youth.

== See also ==
- Wyckoff-Bennett Homestead, another historic house in Brooklyn
- List of the oldest buildings in New York
- List of the oldest buildings in the United States
- List of museums and cultural institutions in New York City
- List of New York City Designated Landmarks in Brooklyn
- List of National Historic Landmarks in New York City
- National Register of Historic Places listings in Brooklyn
