= Van Liew-Suydam House =

Coordinates: 40.477778°N 74.537667°W

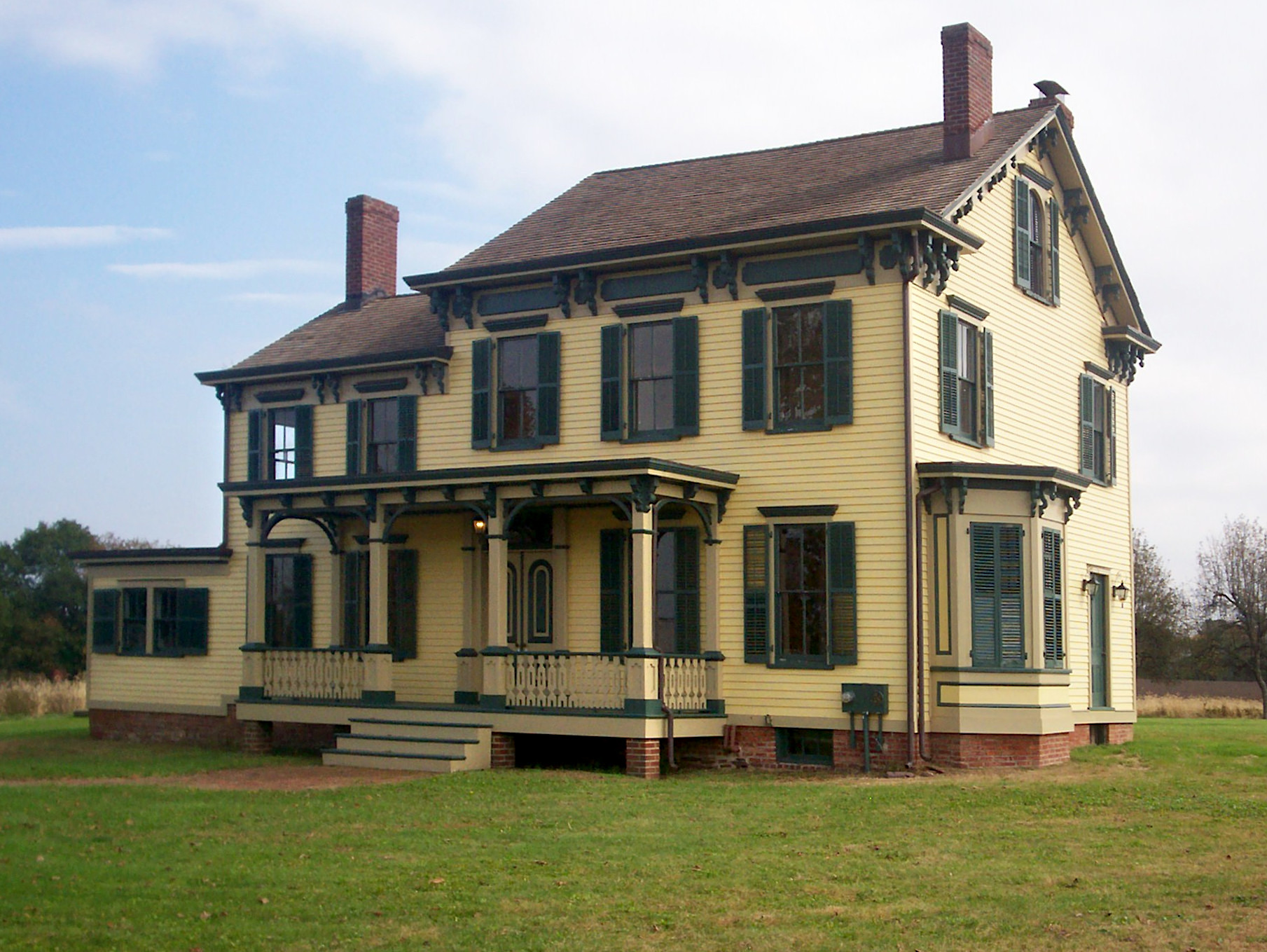
Van Liew-Suydam House in 2006

The Van Liew-Suydam House is located at 280 South Middlebush Road in Somerset, New Jersey. It was built in the 18th century by Peter Van Liew. Joseph Suydam later built an addition to the house. The largest section of the house was built in 1875.

In October 2019, filming began on a Stephen King miniseries starring Julianne Moore and Clive Owen at the house.

== See also ==
- Meadows Foundation (New Jersey)
