= Hageman Farm =

Historic house in New Jersey, United States

Coordinates: 40°29′11″N 74°32′05″W

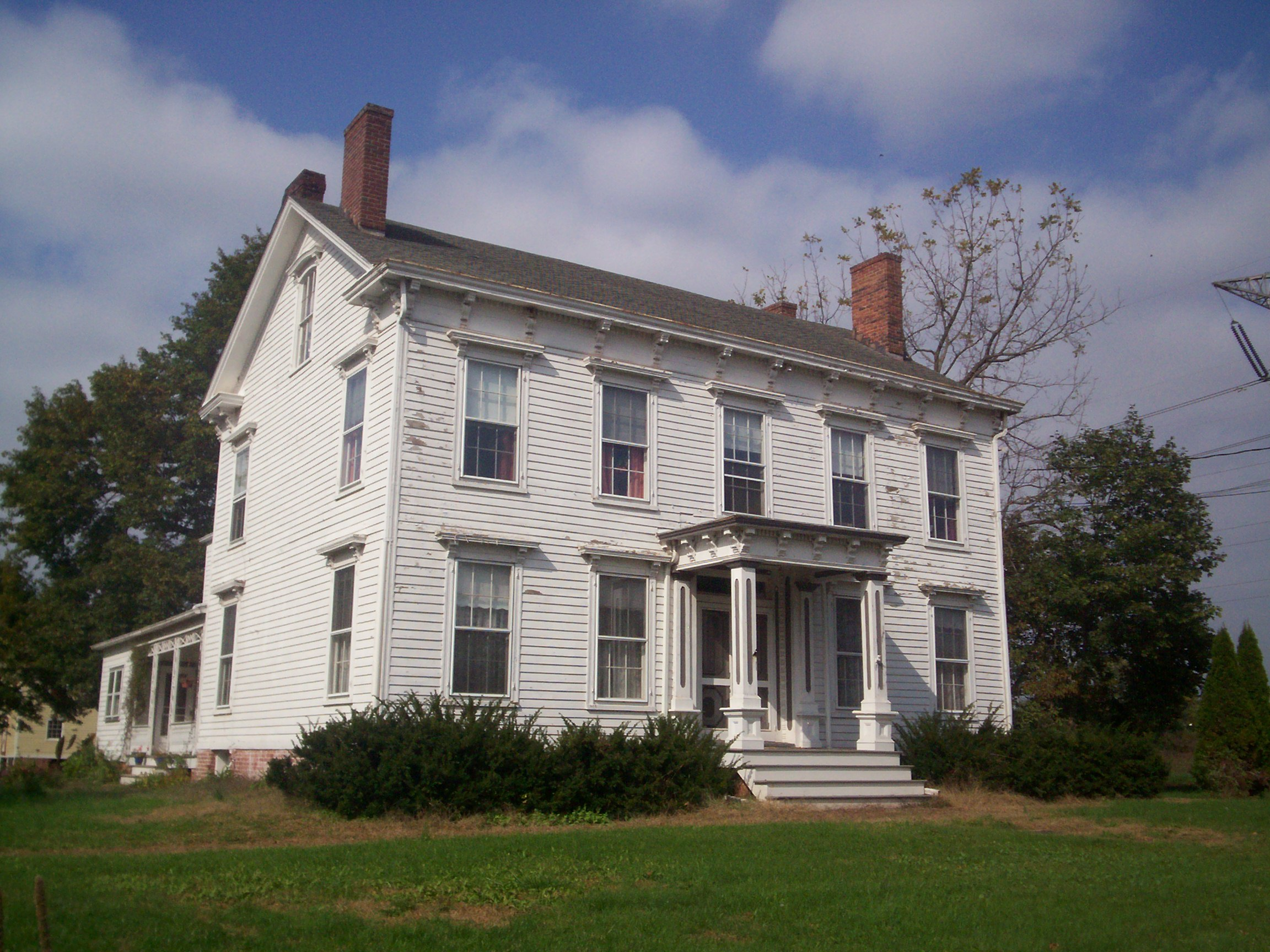
Hageman Farm House in 2006

The Hageman Farm is a historic house located at 209 South Middlebush Road in Somerset, New Jersey. It is a registered historic place of New Jersey.

The progenitors of the Hageman family were Catherine and Adrian Hegeman, who emigrated from the Netherlands around 1650 or 1651. They first settled in Flatbush, New York, then in 1702, four grandsons of Adrian and Catherine moved to Six Mile Run, New Jersey.
