= Meadows Foundation (New Jersey) =

Coordinates: 40.525201°N 74.496188°W

The Meadows Foundation of Somerset County, New Jersey is a nonprofit corporation founded in 1978. It oversaw the restoration of seven historic houses in Somerset.

== Houses ==
- Van Liew-Suydam House, 280 South Middlebush Road. It was built in the 18th century by Peter Van Liew. Joseph Suydam later built the part of the house that is visible today. The newest and largest portion of the house was built in 1875. Although the most recent long term owner of the house was named French, the house has been named after its two initial owners.
- Van Wickle House, 1289 Easton Avenue. The house, also known as the Meadows, was added to the National Register of Historic Places on December 4, 1973.
- Tulipwood, 1165 Hamilton Street. The house was added to the National Register of Historic Places on September 9, 2005.
- Hageman Farm, 209 South Middlebush Road.
- Wyckoff–Garretson House, 215 South Middlebush Road.
- Franklin Inn, 2371 Amwell Road. Historically known as the Van Liew Farmhouse.
- Blackwells Mills Canal House, Blackwells Mills Road & Canal Road. The Bridge Tender's house is a contributing property of the Delaware and Raritan Canal historic district, added to the National Register of Historic Places on May 11, 1973.
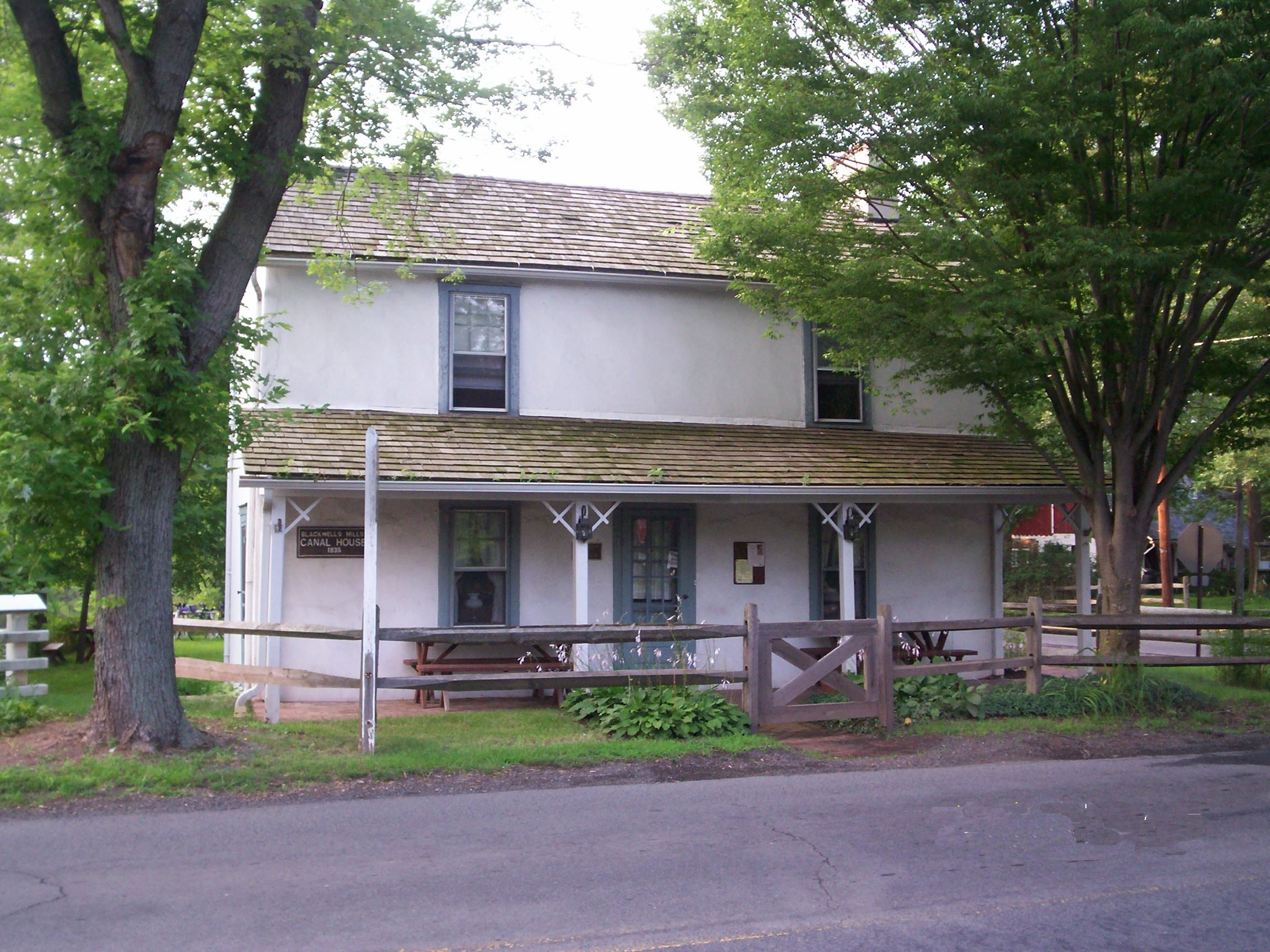
Blackwells Mills Canal House

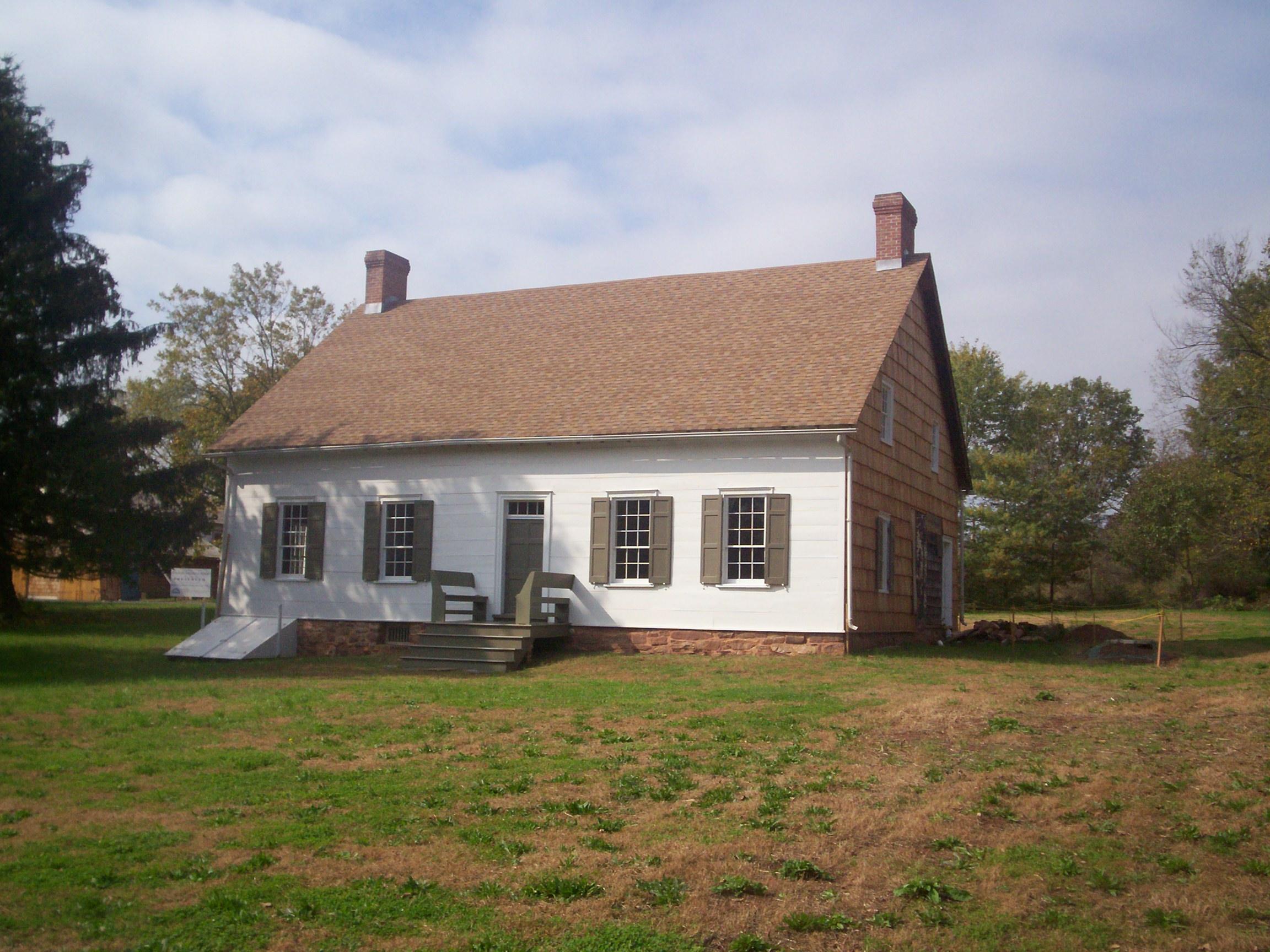
Wyckoff–Garretson House

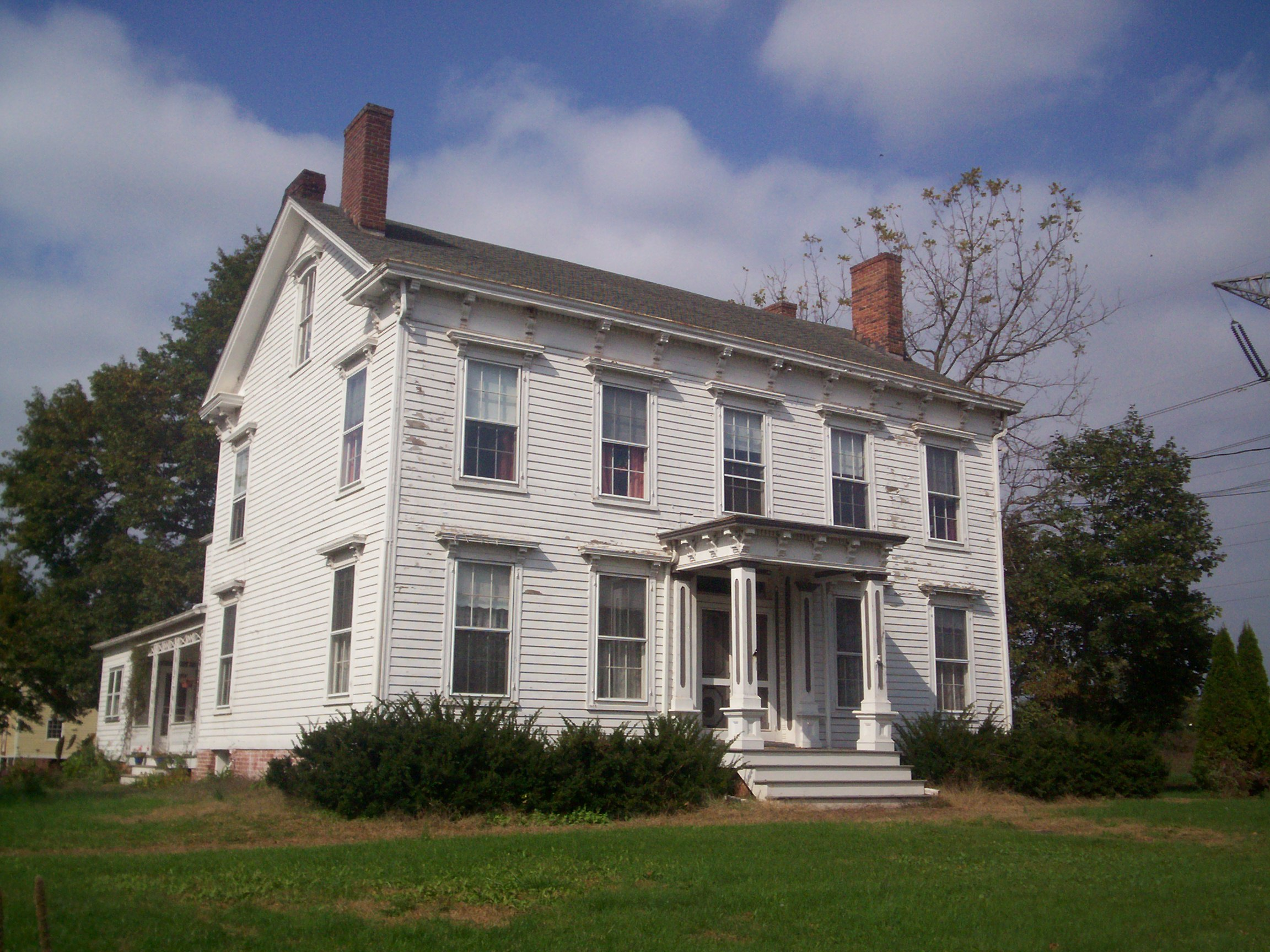
Hageman Farm House

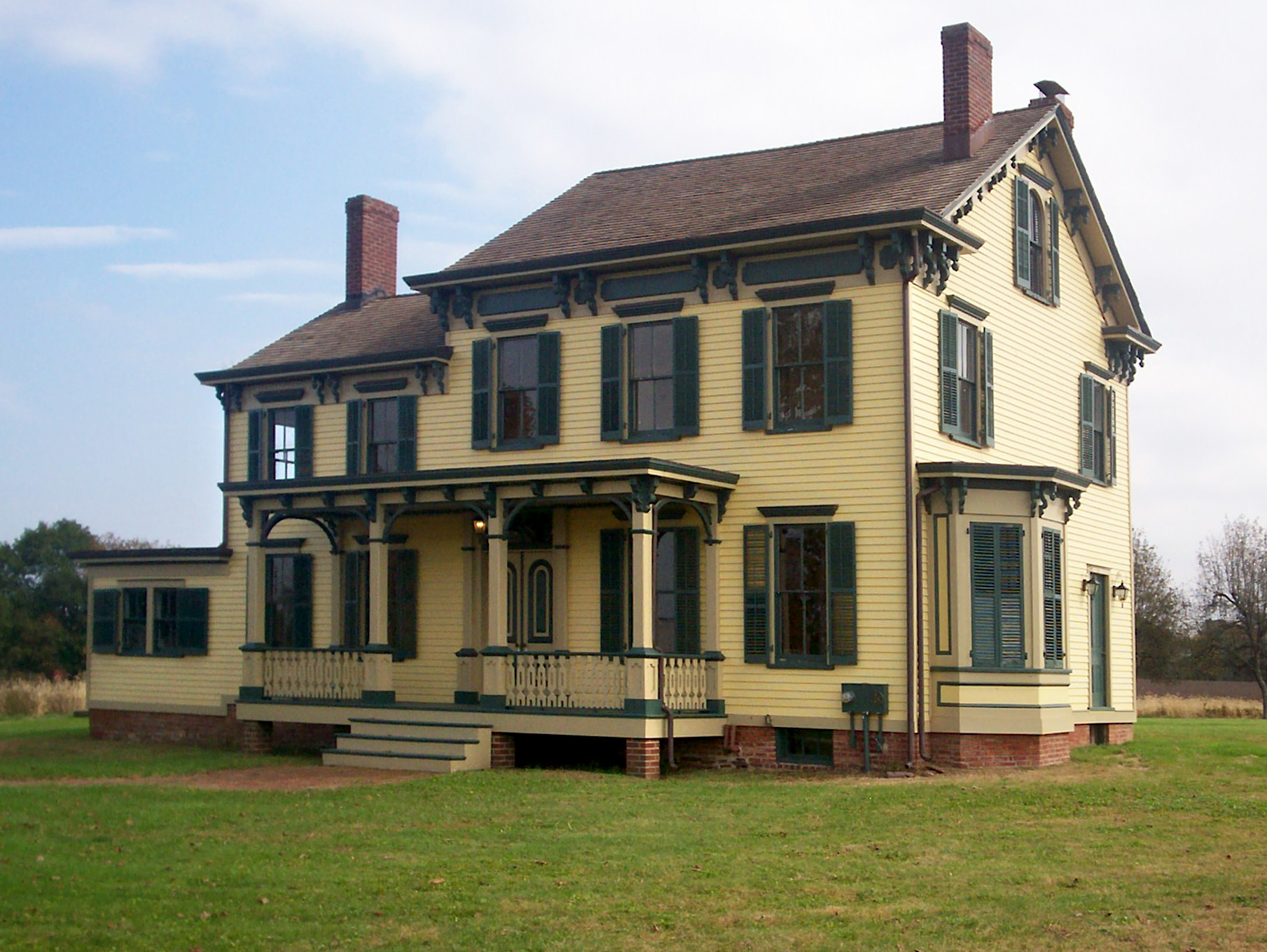
Van Liew-Suydam House

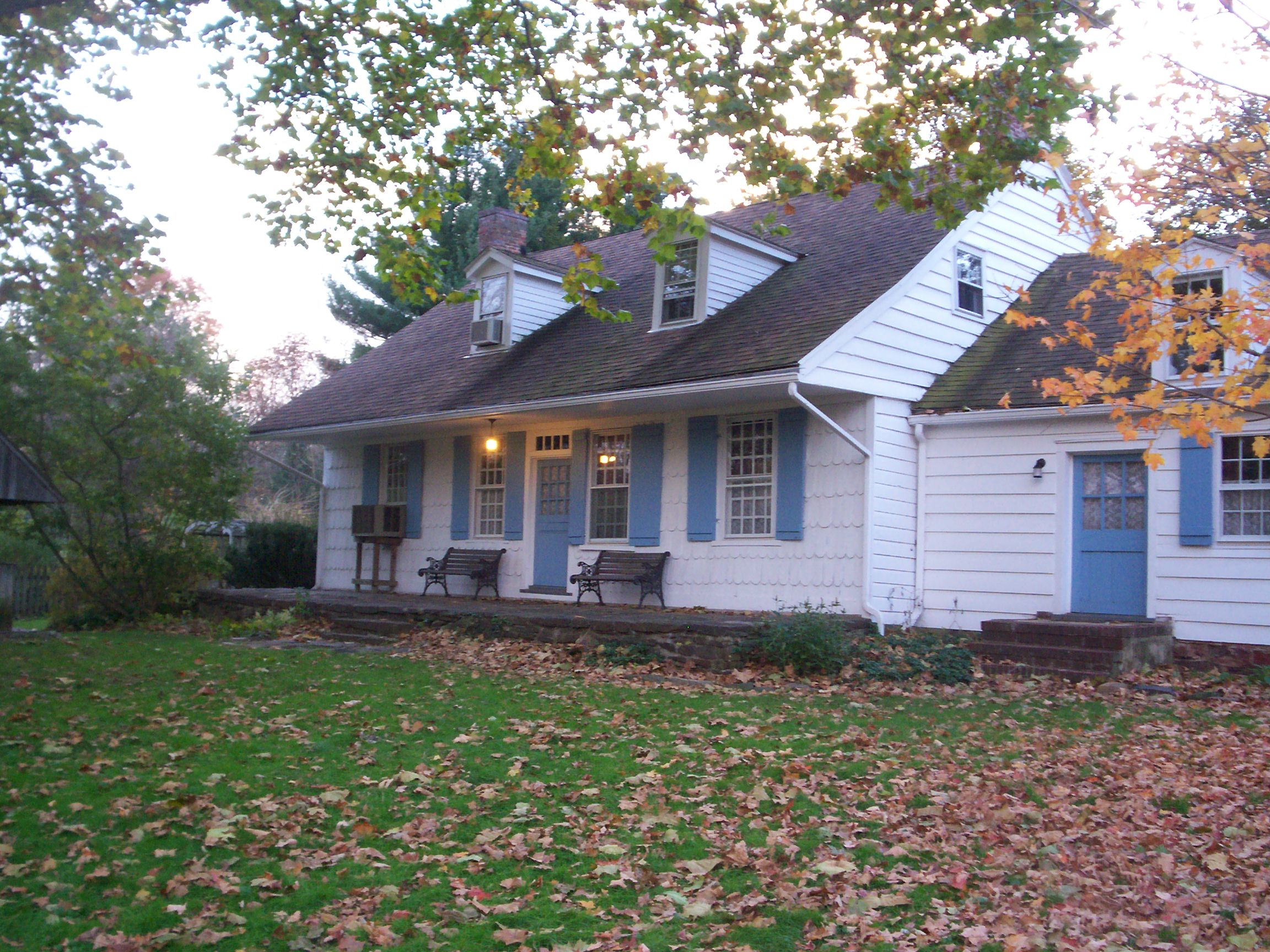
Van Wickle House

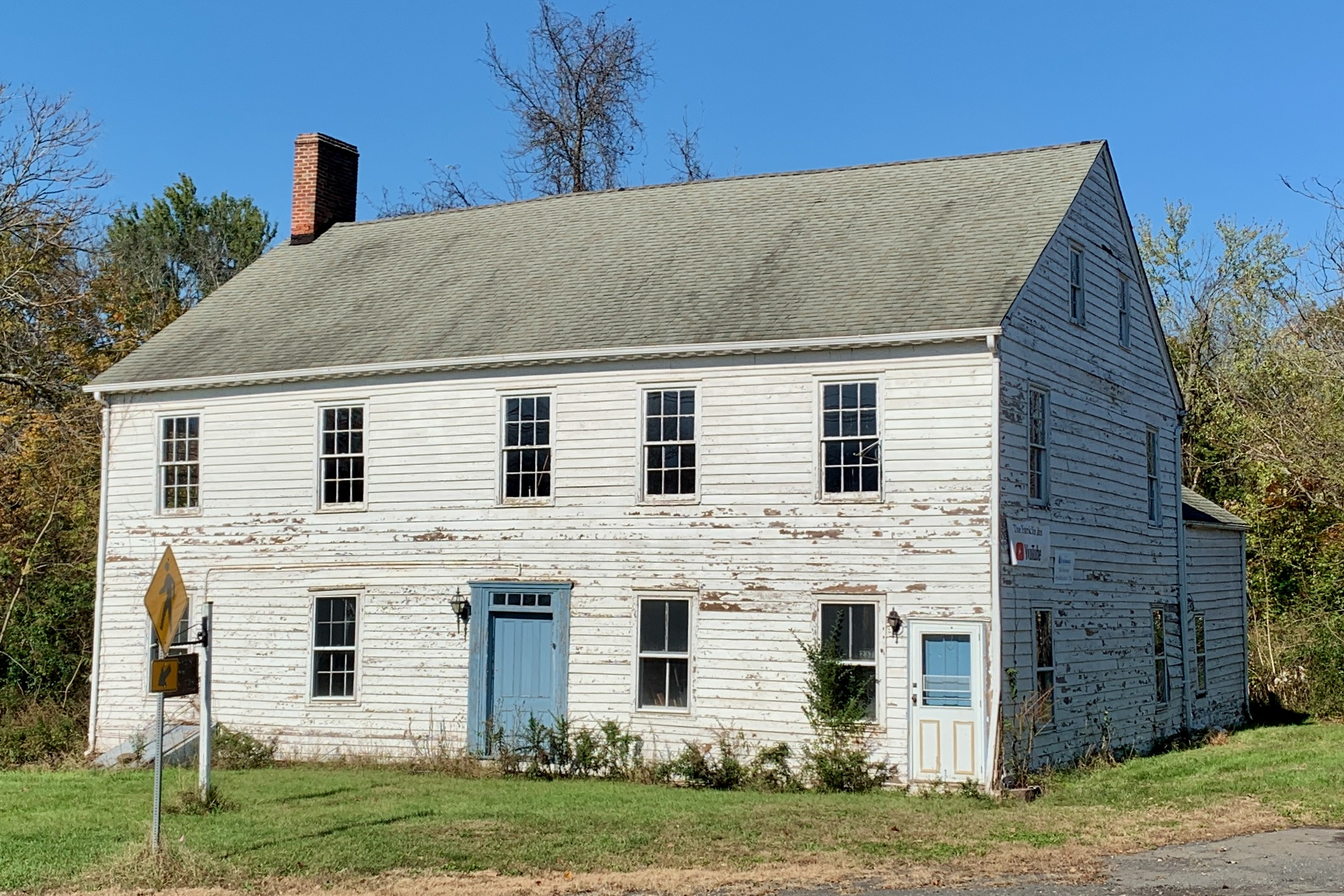
Franklin Inn

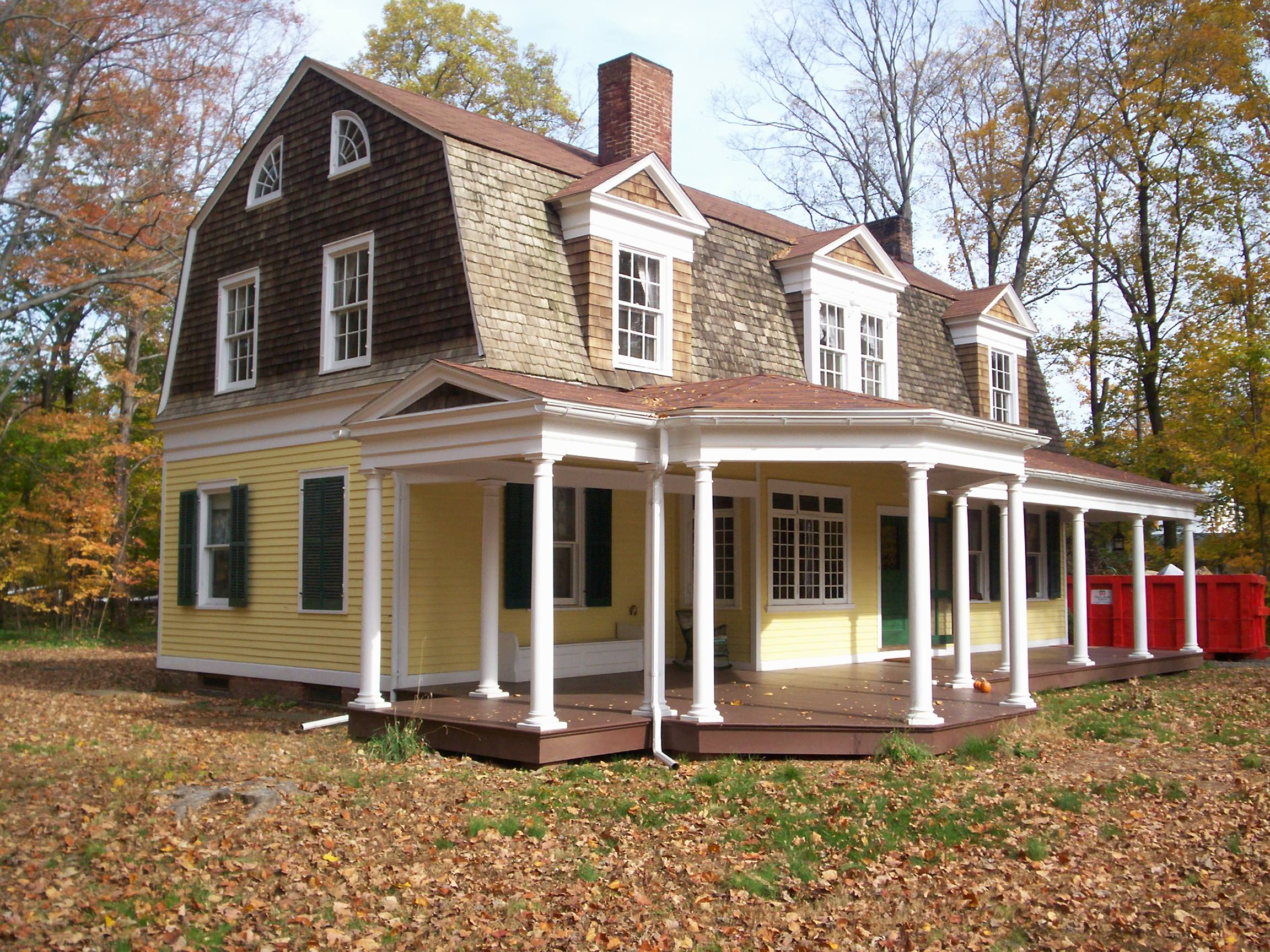
Tulipwood

== See also ==
- Monmouth County Historical Association
- New Bridge Landing
- Road Up Raritan Historic District
