= Cornelius Low House =

Historic house in New Jersey, United States

- Ivy Hall
- U.S. National Register of Historic Places
- New Jersey Register of Historic Places
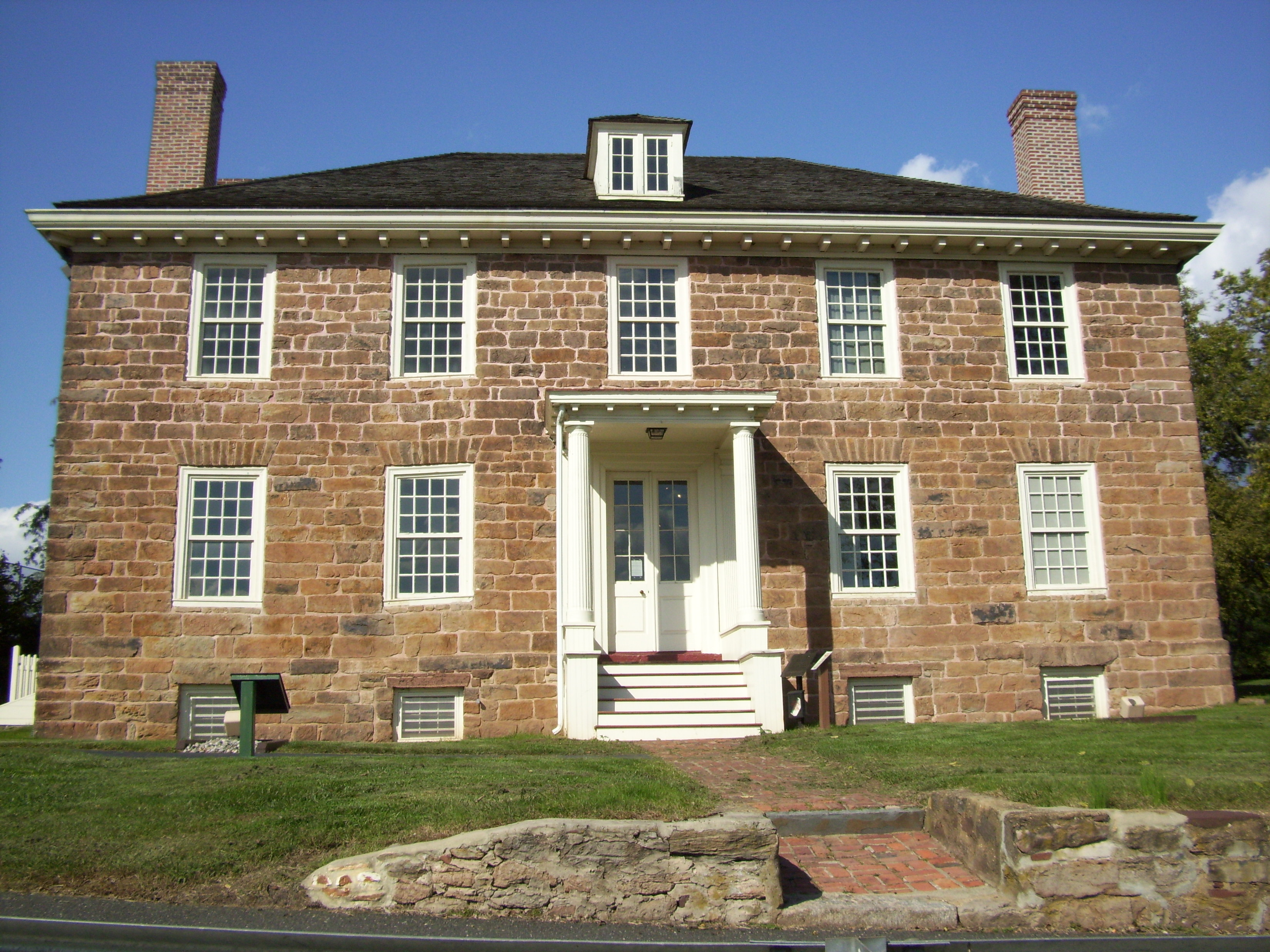
- Cornelius Low House in 2008

- Location within Middlesex County, New Jersey Location within New Jersey Location within the United States
- Location: 1225 River Rd, Piscataway, NJ 08854
- Coordinates: 40°30′45″N 74°27′45″W
- Area: 2 acres (0.81 ha)
- Built: 1741
- NRHP reference No.: 71000510
- NJRHP No.: 1911

Significant dates
- Added to NRHP: May 27, 1971
- Designated NJRHP: May 6, 1971

The Cornelius Low House, historically known as Ivy Hall, is a Georgian manor in Piscataway of Middlesex County, New Jersey, United States. It was built in 1741 at Raritan Landing. The stone house was added to the National Register of Historic Places on May 27, 1971, for its significance in architecture. The house currently holds the Cornelius Low House/Middlesex County Museum.

== History ==
=== Cornelius Low, Jr. ===
Cornelius Low Jr. (c. 1700–1777) was the third of fifteen children. His grandfather, Peter Cornellessen Low, left Holland for the American colonies in 1659 and settled near Kingston, New York. Peter's eldest son, Cornelius Low, moved to New York and established himself as a merchant. He married Margareta Van Borsum in 1695. During the 1720s, Cornelius Low, Jr. became a successful merchant in Newark, New Jersey. In 1729, he married Johanna Gouveneur, and they made plans to move to the emerging port community of Raritan Landing, near New Brunswick. Having shipping capabilities, Low became one of the community's most prosperous businessmen.

During a great flood in 1738, Low lost his first home, located along the wharf near Landing Lane, in Raritan. The Low family moved into a new house on the bluff overlooking Raritan Landing by 1741. The new location allowed Low to keep a watchful eye on the activities at the wharves, and especially at his warehouse located between the river and the Great Road.

Cornelius Low died in early 1777, but the British spared his house because his loyalty to the King of England remained steadfast until his death.

== Architecture ==
The main portion of the home measures forty feet by thirty feet and originally included a 1 1/2-story kitchen wing. When it was built, it was one of the largest and most expensive in the province of East Jersey. It was built with more than 350 tons of sandstone. While most of the homes at Raritan Landing had stone foundations, this was the only house to have been built entirely out of stone. Today, the community of Raritan Landing is all but forgotten. The remains of the once-thriving village lie beneath portions of Johnson Park and River Road. The Low House is one of two remaining structures from the Landing and is a vital link to Piscataway and Middlesex County history.

Low wished the front of his home to reflect his stature as one of the most influential and prosperous men of the community. To that end, a ledge, or sill course, sits approximately three feet up from the ground and encircles the house. This sill makes the house appear to be sitting on a pedestal. Low purchased large, rectangular blocks of high quality stone for the front facade (facing the river and the community of Raritan Landing), most likely quarried in the Newark area. Low was a frugal man and the only finely dressed stone is on the side of the house facing Raritan Landing. The other three sides were built of less expensive rubble stone, or irregular pieces that required minimal dressing.

=== Kitchen "ghost" ===
It is believed the Metlar family removed the kitchen wing around 1870.. A shadow, or kitchen "ghost," of the removed structure is visible on the exterior due to the different colored mortar between the stones. Within the shadow, an outline of the doorway that led into this room is visible. Due to its proximity to the kitchen, this room was most likely used primarily for dining or entertaining.

=== Delft tiles ===
The fireplaces in the Low House contain original 18th century Delft tiles. Delft tiles take their name from the city Delft, in Holland, where the tiles were first created in the 16th century. Until that time, tiles had been used as flooring and were made from red clay. By the end of the 16th century the tiles were used as wall tiles in many homes. Dutch houses were built near the water and, given the climate, tiles were ideal for keeping out the dampness and were used on the joining of walls and floors and for walls behind fireplaces..

== Restoration ==
=== Preservation ===
The five families that have owned the property—the Lows, Pools, Metlars, Voorhees and the Strongs—were, for the most part, wealthier families who could economically afford the maintenance necessary with a property such as this. The Low House today is one of only two remaining structures from Raritan Landing, and is considered an example of Georgian-style architecture in America.

In 1979, Middlesex County, New Jersey bought the house and grounds. Under the guidance and administration of the Middlesex County Cultural and Heritage Commission. The County acquired the Low House to use as a local heritage museum for discussing the history of New Jersey and its context within that of national events.

=== Exterior restoration ===
While the house was in fair condition when obtained by the county, some changes were made. A garage and pool were removed from the back yard, and a new parking area was created next to the building. The ivy, which caused people to refer to the house as “Ivy Hall,” was removed. The entire roof, including the badly deteriorated support structure, was replaced in 1982–1983. Cedar shingles replaced the slate tiles that had been put on decades earlier. In 1987–1988, restoration replicas were installed to replace badly worn windows on the side of the house facing the water.

During the 1990s, a massive restoration was initiated to address major issues plaguing the Low House. In 1995, the Cultural and Heritage Commission and the Board of Chosen Freeholders accepted a grant from the New Jersey State Historic Trust for the restoration of the Low House. Under the guidance of Ford Farwell Mills and Gatch architects of Princeton, the restoration took place between 1995 and 1996. The Commission also installed new landscaping and built an "interpretive path," which included installations that tell the history of the house. The front facade was also repointed.

The first and second floor windows are approximately three inches off square and appear crooked. Originally, the two basement windows closest to the front entrance were doorways. These allowed access to the basement for Low's servants and workers so that certain goods could be stored there rather than in the warehouse along the Great Road. The front yard has since been substantially filled but the doorway outlines are still visible in the basement. Sometime after Low's death, these doorways were altered and turned into windows. Subsequently, the house settled and these windows are no longer square. In the mid-1980s, the front windows, having been severely exposed to the elements, were replaced. Rather than square up the window openings, the restoration firm installed fully functional, though crooked, windows in their place.

=== Interior restoration ===
From 1995 through most of 1996, Arvid Myhre Building Construction Company of Frenchtown, New Jersey completed the physical rehabilitation of the house. 26 layers of paint were stripped from the woodwork which was then repainted in historically accurate colors. Behind-the-scenes work included complete upgrades of heating and cooling systems, new electrical wiring encased in metal conduit, a state-of-the-art dry-feed fire suppression system, and new plumbing and water supply systems. Additionally, an exhibit system was fabricated to protect the original plaster walls, while still allowing the museum to install changing exhibitions.

== Archaeology ==
Prior to restoration, an archaeological study of the grounds was undertaken, led by Hunter Research of Trenton. These digs yielded a wide variety of objects including clay pipe fragments, Delft tiles, glass pieces, and a British military button. The artifacts would help give more clues to what was going on in and around this house over the years, and would also confirm previous theories and thoughts regarding its history.

== See also ==
- National Register of Historic Places listings in Middlesex County, New Jersey
- List of the oldest buildings in New Jersey
