= Franklin Inn =

Coordinates: 40.503556°N 74.581806°W

- U.S. Historic district – Contributing property
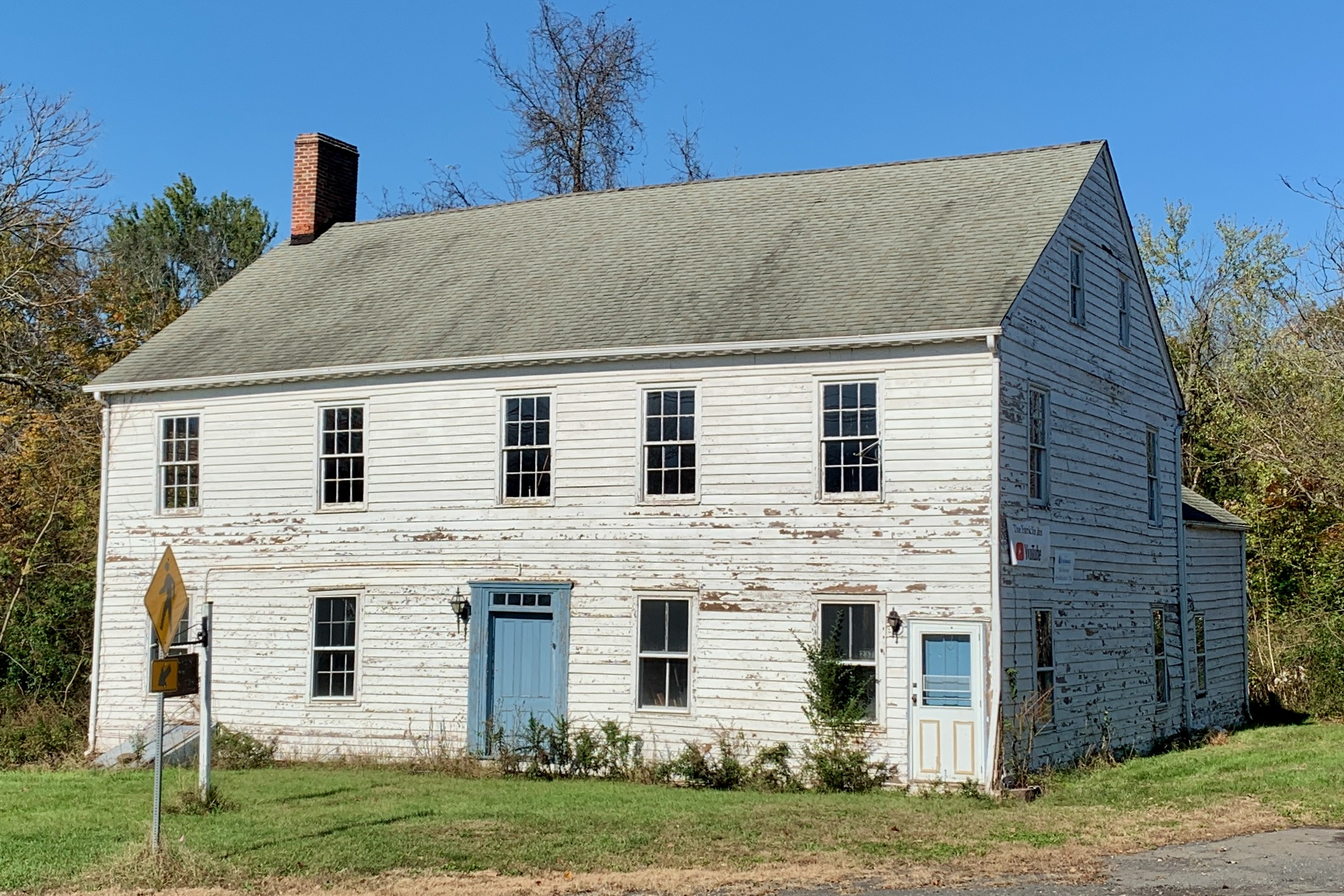
- Franklin Inn in 2020
- Part of: East Millstone Historic District (ID83001613)
- Designated CP: March 17, 1983

The Franklin Inn, also known as the Franklin Inn-Van Liew Homestead, is located at 2371 Amwell Road (Route 514) in East Millstone, New Jersey. The oldest portion of the structure was built as a farmhouse was built by Cornelius Van Liew in 1752. After the American Revolutionary War, the house was known as the Annie Van Liew house, after the daughter of Cornelius who successfully sued the British government for property damage and loss incurred during the war. After the Van Liew family sold the property, the farmhouse was remodeled as a tavern and inn. The Franklin Inn was added to the National Register of Historic Places as a contributing property of the East Millstone Historic District on March 17, 1983.

== History ==
Cornelius Van Liew (1734-1777) married Antje Bowman aka Anne Bowman in 1757, and they lived in the house. Their children were: Frederick Van Liew (1758-?); Cornelius Van Liew (1762-?); Antje "Anne" Van Liew (1764-?); Marya "Mary" van Liew (1766-?); Deneys van Liew (1767-?); Johanis "John" Van Liew (1770-?); and Helena Van Liew (1772-?)

In June 1777, during the Revolutionary War, Charles Cornwallis commandeered the house and used it as his headquarters for five days. Several thousand British troops were encamped nearby in what is now Colonial Park Arboretum and Gardens. William Howe, 5th Viscount Howe and his troops were in New Brunswick, New Jersey and Middlebush, New Jersey. During the war, American Revolutionary generals used the house to hold meetings.

The house and property stayed with the Van Liew family until 1822, when it was sold to John Wyckoff. Wyckoff rented the property, and it was used as a tavern starting in 1829. The Delaware and Raritan Canal nearby was opened in 1834.

The tavern was closed in 1916 with prohibition. The building was home to a popular used bookstore that operated from 1992 until the building was closed in 2009 as a result of the damage sustained by the periodic flooding of the Delaware & Raritan Canal and the Millstone River.

== Gallery ==
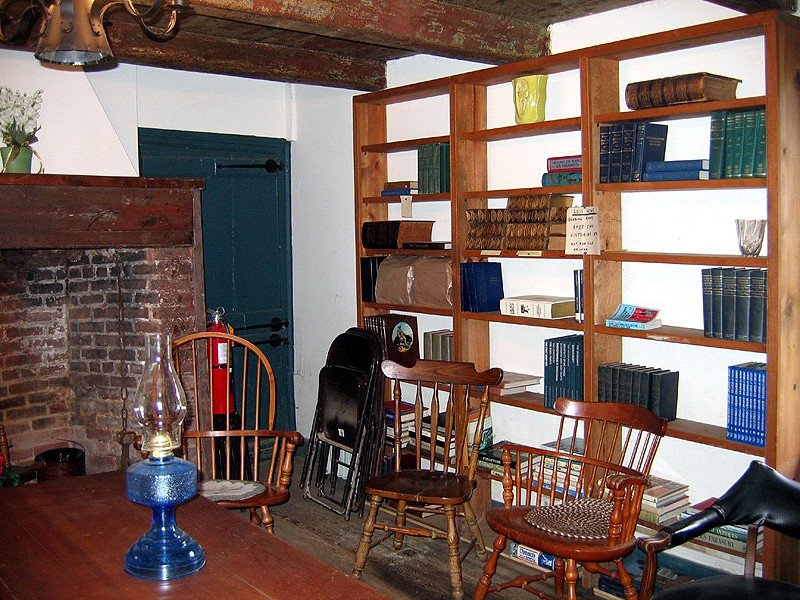
Franklin Inn interior

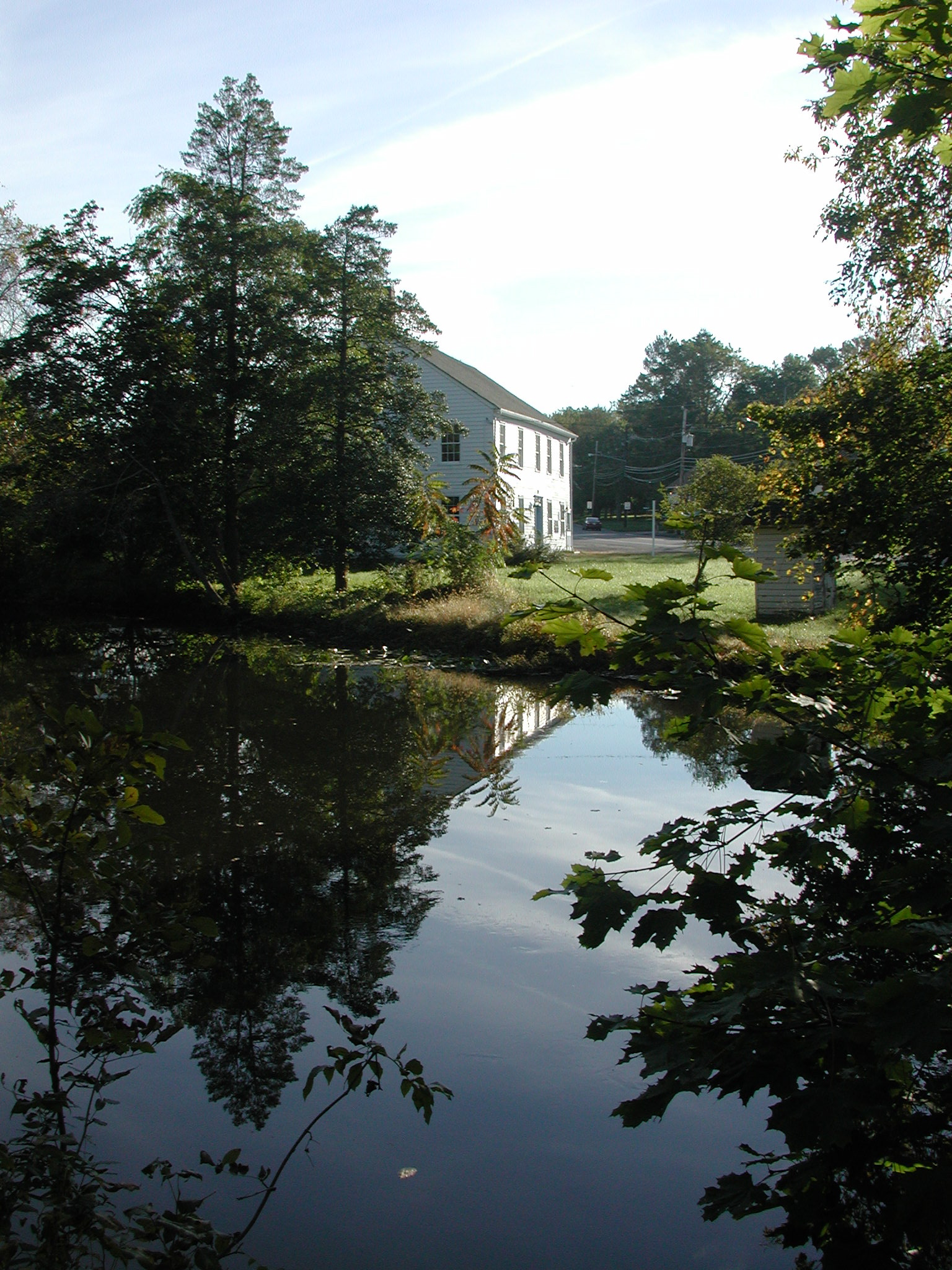
Reflections
