= Van Liew =

Van Liew is a surname. Notable people with the surname include:

- Brad Van Liew, American sailor
- John Van Liew (1881–1959), American football coach

== See also ==
- Van Liew House, house in Somerset County, New Jersey, United States
- Van Liew-Suydam House, house in Somerset County, New Jersey, United States
- Van Liew Cemetery, cemetery in North Brunswick, New Jersey, United States
