= Delaware and Raritan Canal State Park =

State park in New Jersey, United States

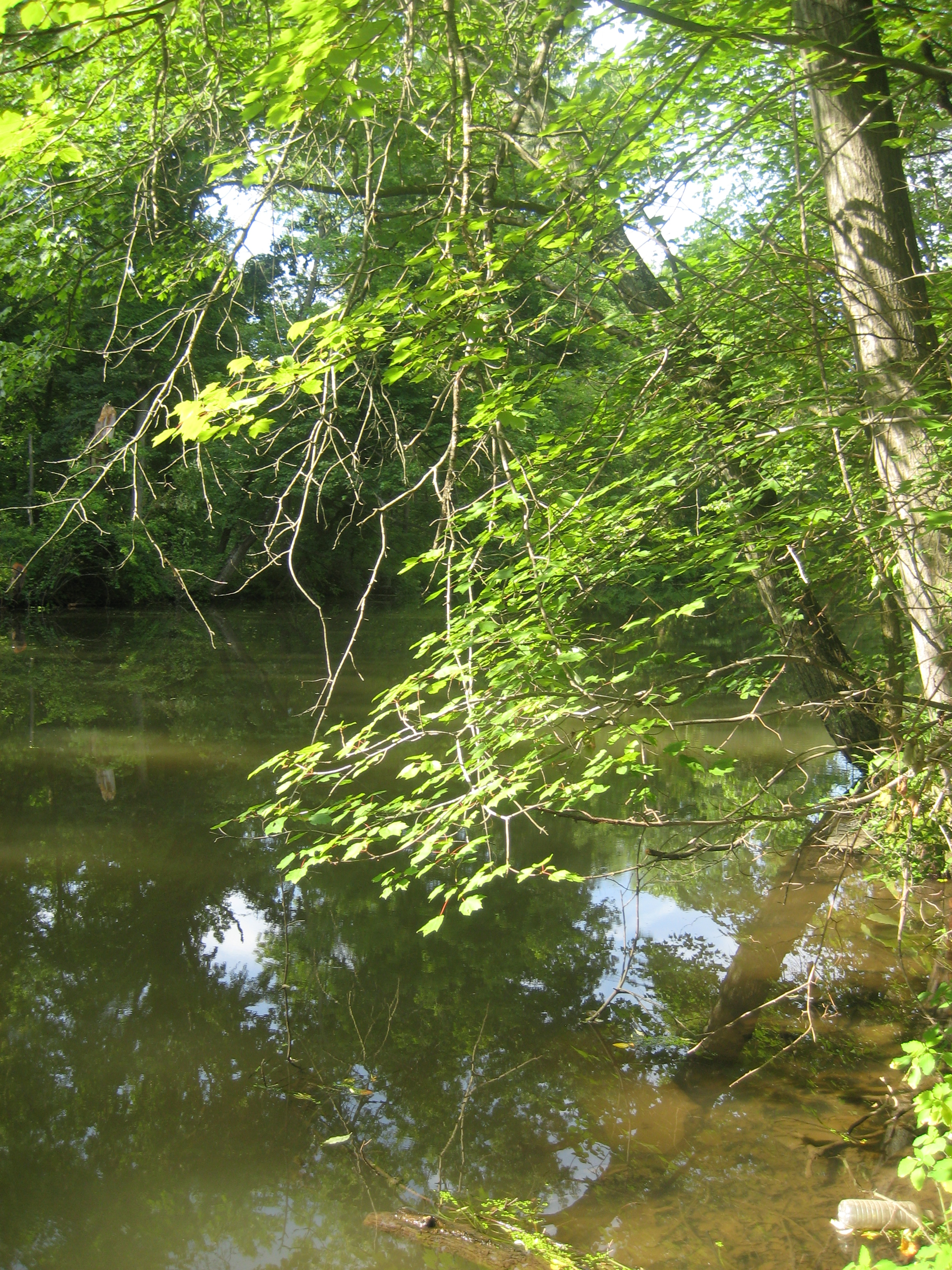
- The D&R Canal running through

- Location within New Jersey Location within the United States
- Location: Franklin Park, New Jersey
- Coordinates: 40°22′07″N 74°36′58″W
- Area: 6,595 acres (26.69 km^{2})
- Opened: 1974
- Operator: New Jersey Division of Parks and Forestry
- Website: Official website

Delaware and Raritan Canal State Park is a New Jersey state park along the Delaware and Raritan Canal.

== History ==
In 1974, most of the canal system was declared a New Jersey state park. It remains one today, and is used for canoeing, kayaking, and fishing. A graded natural-surface trail along the side of the canal, which was the tow path that mules used to tow barges on the canal before steam powered barges, is now used for hiking, jogging, bicycling, and horseback riding. These trail connect with the trails in Pennsylvania's Delaware Canal State Park by way of five bridges that cross the Delaware River. Some 36 miles (58 km) of the main canal, and all 22 miles (35 km) of the feeder canal, still exist. The park is operated and maintained by the New Jersey Division of Parks and Forestry.

The canal is accessible from many points along its route, with small parking areas providing access at most road crossings. One of the most scenic and popular sections of the D&R Canal state park is the segment along Lake Carnegie in Princeton, New Jersey, which features the canal on one side of the path and the lake on the other side. Another attractive section borders the Colonial Park Arboretum and Gardens in East Millstone.

When the canal was used for transportation, New Jersey's landscape was mostly rural, and its primary business was agriculture. Research director of the New Jersey Historical Commission Howard Green is quoted as saying, "it is one of the most beloved parks in the state, a sinewy, snake-like greenway through one of the most heavily populated parts of the world. It has gone from being the machine in the garden, to being the garden in the machine."
