= D&R Canal Trail =

Trail in New Jersey, United States

Coordinates: 40.4754°N 74.5714°W

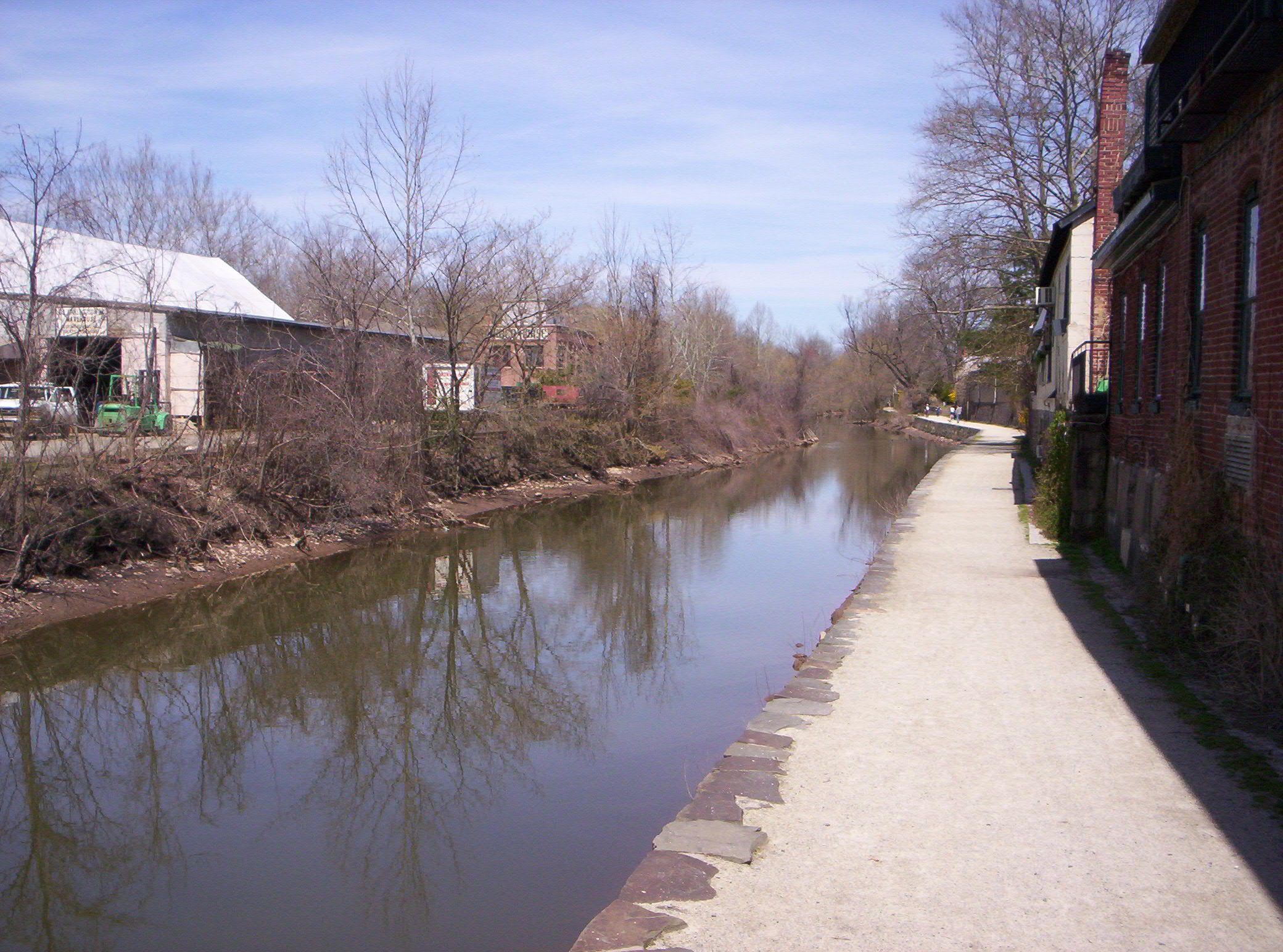
- D&R Canal Trail in Lambertville, New Jersey
- Length: 77 mi (124 km)
- Trailheads: Trenton; Frenchtown; New Brunswick
- Use: Hiking, Cycling
- Difficulty: Easy
- Season: Year round
- Hazards: Road crossings, adjacent canal
- Surface: Stone dust
- Right of way: United New Jersey Railroad and Canal Company
- Website: Official D&R Canal Park site

The D&R Canal trail is a recreational trail in the U.S. state of New Jersey. The 77-mile (124 km) trail is made up of three segments that traverse three counties: a canal towpath from New Brunswick to Trenton; a canal towpath/rail trail from Trenton to Bull's Island; and a rail trail from Bull's Island to Frenchtown. The three combined trails together form the largest completed trail in New Jersey. Much of the trail runs along the existing Delaware & Raritan Canal within the Delaware and Raritan Canal State Park.

There is no direct connection between the main and feeder canal paths along the Delaware River. Signed on-street connections are required to traverse the trail system in its entirety.

The proposed Capital to Coast Trail is planned to connect to the D&R Canal Trail. The trail is also part of the East Coast Greenway, a 3,000 mile long trail system connecting Maine to Florida.

== Main canal towpath ==
The main canal towpath trail is 29 miles (47 km) long and constructed on the earthen towpath used by mules to pull barges along the canal. The majority of the path was resurfaced in early 2011, however flooding by Hurricane Irene has scoured off the trail's top surface on the New Brunswick end leaving a coarse surface suitable for only pedestrians and mountain bikers. The main entrance in New Brunswick is at the Landing Lane Bridge.

Access Points

- New Brunswick/Landing Lane Bridge
- Route 287/Somerset
- Bound Brook
- Manville Causeway/Weston
- Amwell Road
- Griggstown Causeway, Princeton
- Alexander Street, Princeton

== Feeder canal towpath/rail trail ==
D&R Canal Trail in Stockton along the former railroad right-of-way

The feeder canal was used to supply water to the main canal from the Delaware River. The towpath/rail-trail's surface is sand and crushed stone. The feeder canal trail, including the rail trail to Frenchtown is 28.7 miles (46.2 km) long. The trail begins in Trenton near Route 1 and ends north of Frenchtown.

Access Points

- Washington Crossing State Park
- Lambertville (on street parking)
- Jimison Farm
- Stockton
- Prallsville
- Bull's Island

== Rail trail ==
Technically, the D&R canal starts near Bull's Island (now a state campground) in Raven Rock where it connects to the Delaware River; the trail north of the Bull's Island inlet is a rail trail built on the former rail bed of the Pennsylvania Railroad Belvidere Division; the surface is crushed stone. Bordered by Route 29 on the east and the Delaware River on the west, there are few access points along its length.

The railroad line was originally built in the 1850s by the Belvidere Delaware Railroad which subsequently became a subsidiary of the United New Jersey Railroad and Canal Company. In the early 1870s, the railroad was leased by the Pennsylvania Railroad (PRR) and became an important freight branch. Competition from federally funded highways and automobiles caused passenger service to end by 1960. The government-created entity Conrail abandoned portions of the line between Trenton and Milford in the late 1970s. All trackage was removed by 1982. Much of the feeder canal path is actually a rail-trail; the only official towpath segments are in Trenton and Lambertville. The railroad is still present in Lambertville.

Major Access Points (with parking)

- Bulls Island
- Frenchtown
