= Blackwells Mills Canal House =

American property built c. 1830s

Coordinates: 40.475399°N 74.571985°W

- Bridge Tender's house, Blackwells Mills
- U.S. Historic district – Contributing property
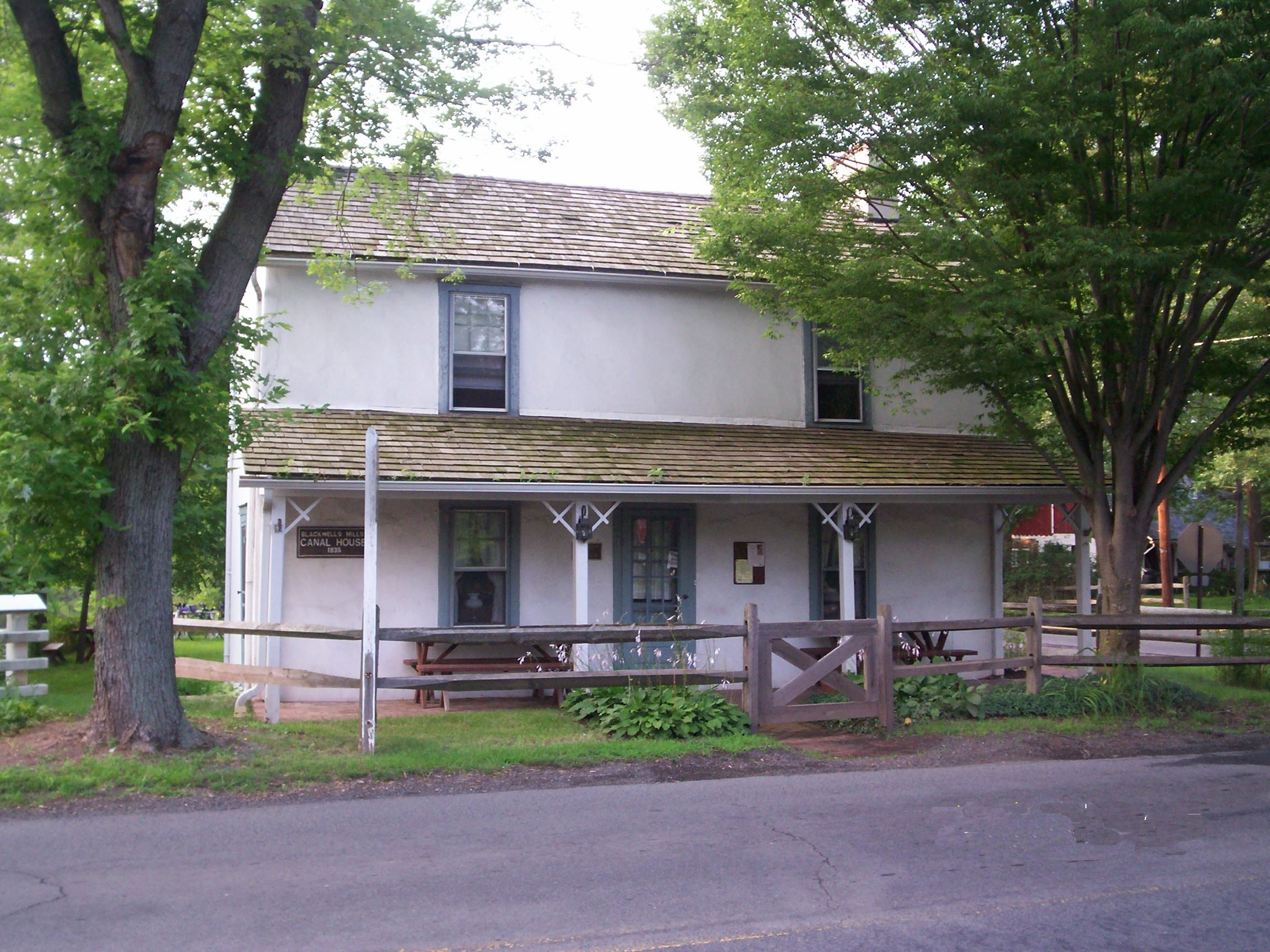
- Part of: Delaware and Raritan Canal (ID73001105)
- Designated CP: May 11, 1973

The Blackwells Mills Canal House is located at Blackwells Mills Road and Canal Road in Franklin Township, Somerset County, New Jersey, United States, on the Delaware and Raritan Canal. Across the canal is Blackwells Mills, New Jersey.

== History ==
The house was built c. 1830s, at the same time as the canal, to house the bridge tender. The bridge tender would turn the swing bridge when boats came through, then turn it back to allow road traffic to cross over the canal. In 1932, the canal closed and the swing bridges were dismantled. The house and the canal were transferred to the state of New Jersey. In 1971 the Blackwells Mills Canal House Association was formed, and they leased the house from the state and began to restore it as a community center, museum, and library. The adjacent Delaware and Raritan Canal was made a state and national historic site and later became a New Jersey State Park. The house is currently maintained by the Blackwells Mills Canal House Association since 1971.

== Sandor Fekete ==
Sandor Fekete (1879-1970) was the last bridge tender. He was born in Hungary, emigrating via Antwerp, Belgium to New York City and joining the Hungarian community in New Brunswick, Middlesex County, New Jersey. His son Sandor Fekete II (1906-1983) lived in Princeton and worked as a bridge tender also. Fekete's first job was laying brick and breaking up rocks along the Delaware and Raritan Canal. Later he was promoted to a supervisor for work boats that made repairs along the canal. He was promoted to foreman of a twenty-eight-man work crew, living in an apartment on Conduct Street in New Brunswick. In 1916 he was promoted to locktender in Griggstown, Somerset County, New Jersey, United States.

== See also ==
- National Register of Historic Places listings in Somerset County, New Jersey
- Bridge tender's house
