= Blackwells Mills, New Jersey =

Populated place in Somerset County, New Jersey, US

- Census-designated place
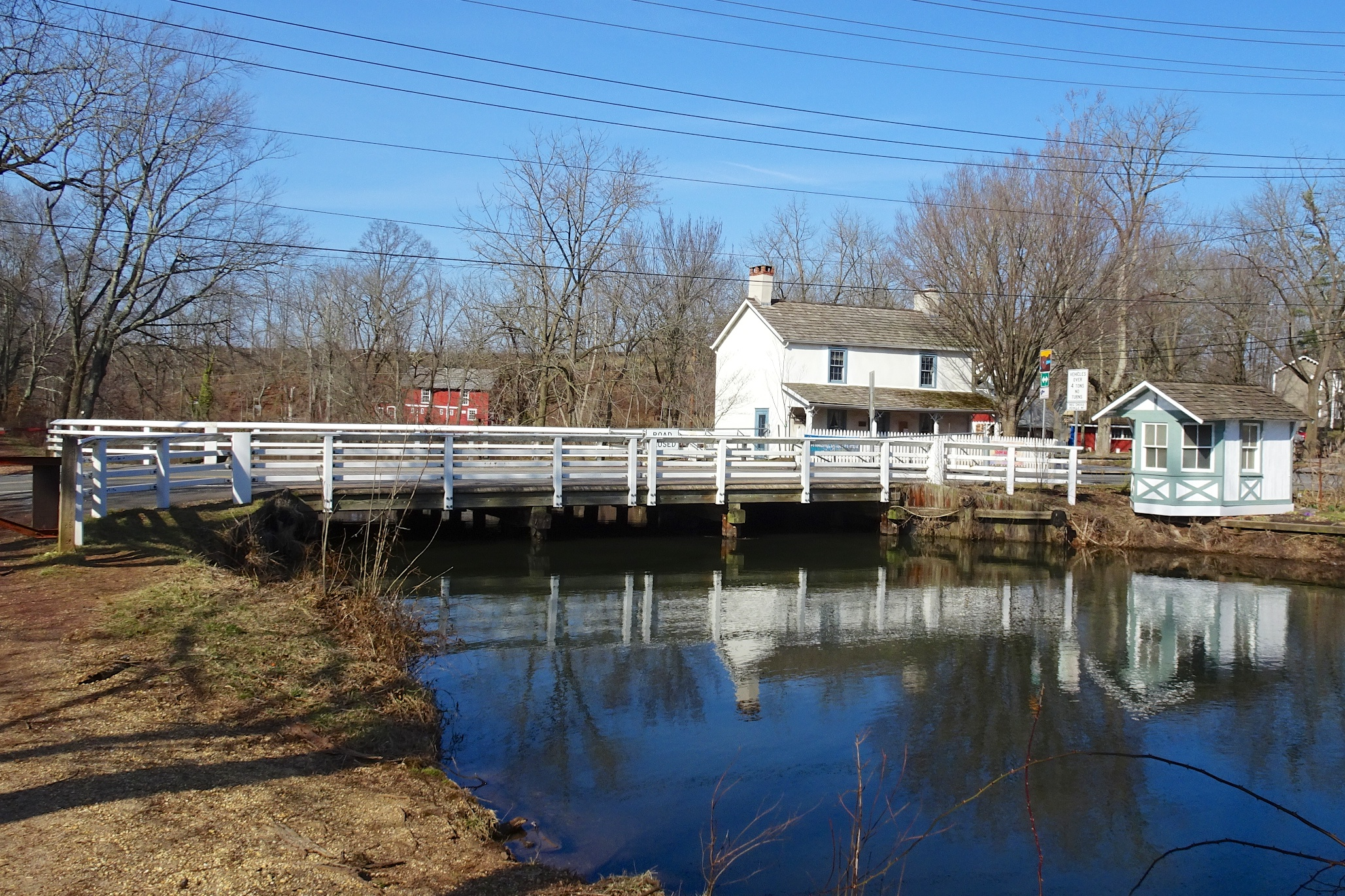
- Bridge tender's house and bridge leading to Blackwells Mills

- Location in Somerset County Location in New Jersey Location in the United States
- Coordinates: 40.483582°N 74.567789°W
- Country: United States
- State: New Jersey
- County: Somerset
- Township: Franklin

Area
  - Total: 7.80 sq mi (20.21 km^{2})
  - Land: 7.68 sq mi (19.89 km^{2})
  - Water: 0.12 sq mi (0.32 km^{2}) 5.70%
- Elevation: 89 ft (27 m)

Population (2020)
  - Total: 9,473
  - Density: 1,233.5/sq mi (476.24/km^{2})
- Time zone: UTC−05:00 (Eastern (EST))
  - Summer (DST): UTC−04:00 (Eastern (EDT))
- Area codes: 609/640 and 732/848
- FIPS code: 34-06025
- GNIS feature ID: 02583968

Blackwells Mills is an unincorporated community and census-designated place (CDP) located in Franklin Township in Somerset County, in the U.S. state of New Jersey. As of the 2020 census, Blackwells Mills had a population of 9,473.

== History ==
Blackwells Mills is on the east side of the Millstone River in Franklin Township, Somerset County, New Jersey. A mill was built in 1746 by Peter Schenk. His daughter married a Mercer and the mill passed to her family. The mill was purchased by William Blackwell in 1804 with his uncle Capt. Jacob Blackwell. These men were from nearby Hopewell Township. William Blackwell built a fine Federal period house on the land across the road on the Hillsborough side. Following Hurricane Floyd, the house was moved westward to higher ground. It is still standing. Following the death of William Blackwell in the 1850s, his son John came into possession of the mill. John Blackwell died early in life, and his widow sold the mill to Augustus VanZant in 1872. On May 31, 1771 the west bank of the Millstone River became Hillsborough Township.

The mill burned down in 1885 and was rebuilt. A major restoration was done in 1943.

== Geography ==
According to the U.S. Census Bureau, Blackwells Mills had a total area of 1.296 square miles (3.356 km^{2}), including 1.222 square miles (3.165 km^{2}) of land and 0.074 square miles (0.191 km^{2}) of water (5.70%).

== Demographics ==
Historical population
Census	Pop.	Note	%±
2010	803		—
2020	9,473		1,079.7%
Population sources: 2010 2020

Blackwells Mills first appeared as a census designated place in the 2010 U.S. census.

=== Racial and ethnic composition ===
Blackwells Mills CDP, New Jersey – Racial and ethnic composition Note: the US Census treats Hispanic/Latino as an ethnic category. This table excludes Latinos from the racial categories and assigns them to a separate category. Hispanics/Latinos may be of any race.
Race / Ethnicity (NH = Non-Hispanic)	Pop 2010	Pop 2020	% 2010	% 2020
White alone (NH)	524	5,720	65.26%	60.38%
Black or African American alone (NH)	83	264	10.34%	2.79%
Native American or Alaska Native alone (NH)	1	11	0.12%	0.12%
Asian alone (NH)	144	2,726	17.93%	28.78%
Native Hawaiian or Pacific Islander alone (NH)	3	3	0.37%	0.03%
Other race alone (NH)	0	23	0.00%	0.24%
Mixed race or Multiracial (NH)	12	286	1.49%	3.02%
Hispanic or Latino (any race)	36	440	4.48%	4.64%
Total	803	9,473	100.00%	100.00%

=== 2020 census ===
As of the 2020 census, Blackwells Mills had a population of 9,473. The median age was 43.2 years. 25.7% of residents were under the age of 18 and 12.9% of residents were 65 years of age or older. For every 100 females there were 97.6 males, and for every 100 females age 18 and over there were 97.4 males age 18 and over.

93.7% of residents lived in urban areas, while 6.3% lived in rural areas.

There were 2,893 households in Blackwells Mills, of which 48.0% had children under the age of 18 living in them. Of all households, 85.1% were married-couple households, 5.4% were households with a male householder and no spouse or partner present, and 8.0% were households with a female householder and no spouse or partner present. About 7.0% of all households were made up of individuals and 4.2% had someone living alone who was 65 years of age or older.

There were 2,932 housing units, of which 1.3% were vacant. The homeowner vacancy rate was 0.7% and the rental vacancy rate was 4.3%.

=== 2010 census ===
The 2010 United States census counted 803 people, 238 households, and 218 families in the CDP. The population density was 657.1 per square mile (253.7/km^{2}). There were 241 housing units at an average density of 197.2 per square mile (76.1/km^{2}). The racial makeup was 69.12% (555) White, 10.96% (88) Black or African American, 0.12% (1) Native American, 17.93% (144) Asian, 0.37% (3) Pacific Islander, 0.00% (0) from other races, and 1.49% (12) from two or more races. Hispanic or Latino of any race were 4.48% (36) of the population.

Of the 238 households, 61.3% had children under the age of 18; 85.7% were married couples living together; 4.6% had a female householder with no husband present and 8.4% were non-families. Of all households, 3.8% were made up of individuals and 0.4% had someone living alone who was 65 years of age or older. The average household size was 3.34 and the average family size was 3.43.

32.6% of the population were under the age of 18, 5.6% from 18 to 24, 23.0% from 25 to 44, 34.4% from 45 to 64, and 4.4% who were 65 years of age or older. The median age was 40.9 years. For every 100 females, the population had 94.9 males. For every 100 females ages 18 and older there were 96.0 males.

== Blackwells Mills Canal House ==
The Blackwells Mills Canal House, located at Blackwells Mills Road and Canal Road along the Delaware and Raritan Canal, was built c. 1830s, at the same time as the canal. It was constructed to house the bridge tender, who would open the swing bridge when canal boats came through, then close it to allow traffic to cross over the canal. It is a contributing property of the Delaware and Raritan Canal historic district, added to the National Register of Historic Places on May 11, 1973.
