= Bulls Island Recreation Area =

Park in New Jersey, United States

- Interactive map of Bulls Island Recreation Area
- Location: Raven Rock, Hunterdon County, New Jersey
- Coordinates: 40°24′35″N 75°02′14″W
- Area: 79-acre (0.32 km^{2})
- Operator: New Jersey Division of Parks and Forestry
- Website: Official website

The 79-acre (0.32 km^{2}) Bulls Island Recreation Area is on Bulls Island at Raven Rock along the Delaware River approximately 3 miles (4.8 km) north of Stockton, within Delaware Township in Hunterdon County, New Jersey, United States. The park is a part of the 3,578 acres (14.48 km^{2}) Delaware and Raritan Canal State Park. It offers a boat launch, fishing, and a nature trail. Canoes, kayaks, tubes, and rafts can be rented three miles north in Point Pleasant. The surrounding park includes a portion of the D&R Canal Trail, a multi-use trail built on the former Belvidere-Delaware Railroad bed that runs along the island on a north–south route. The park is operated and maintained by the New Jersey Division of Parks and Forestry.

In June 2011, William Arias, 46, of Bound Brook, New Jersey was killed by a falling tree while sleeping in a tent in the upper river section of the Bulls Island campground. The state of New Jersey determined that silt buildup from repeated floods had weakened roots of trees in this area. The park system decided to permanently close the campground area and return it to a natural state.

== See also ==
- List of New Jersey state parks
