= Landing Lane Bridge =

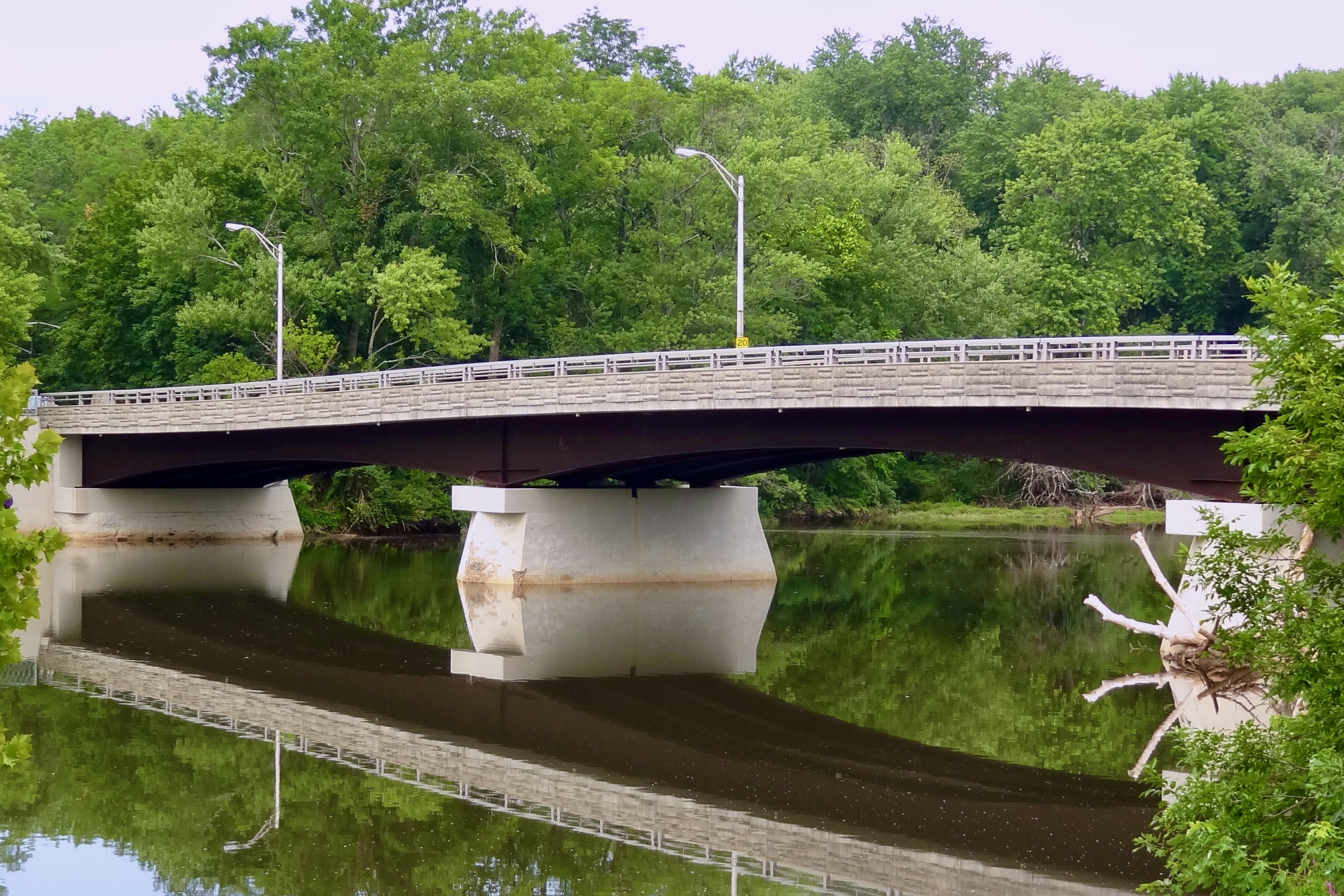
- Coordinates: 40°30′31″N 74°27′50″W
- Carries: 2 lanes of CR 609 (Landing Lane) and 1 sidewalk
- Crosses: Raritan River
- Locale: New Brunswick and Piscataway, Middlesex County, New Jersey
- Maintained by: Middlesex County

Characteristics
- No. of spans: 3
- Piers in water: 2

History
- Opened: 1895

Landing Lane Bridge is part of County Route 609 and spans the Raritan River and the Delaware and Raritan Canal in New Jersey. The two lane bridge connects Piscataway to the north with New Brunswick to the south. The approaching roadways on both sides are known as "Landing Lane." The Delaware and Raritan Canal State Park and towpath is accessible from the bridge.

== History ==
The current span officially was opened in 1895, replacing a previous structure. However, the entire metal grate deck and steel truss was replaced in 1995 with a slightly wider modern metal beam structure and an asphalt covered roadway. The piers were only refurbished rather than being replaced, as this would have required Coast Guard approval, which would have added years to the refurbishment project. (The river, though unnavigable at this location, is under Coast Guard jurisdiction as it is tidal from Raritan Bay to a few hundred yards north of the Landing Lane Bridge.) This complication also prevented the bridge from being replaced with a four-lane-wide span. The plaque from the 1895 metal truss structure is on display at the northern end of the bridge.

During the American Revolutionary War, Washington's troops were retreating from the British over the Landing Lane Bridge. Washington ordered his troops to destroy the bridge to impede the British. The bridge was partially destroyed before the British caught up with them.

The bridge helps to connect the East Coast Greenway, a 3,000 mile long trail system connecting Maine to Florida.

== Gallery ==
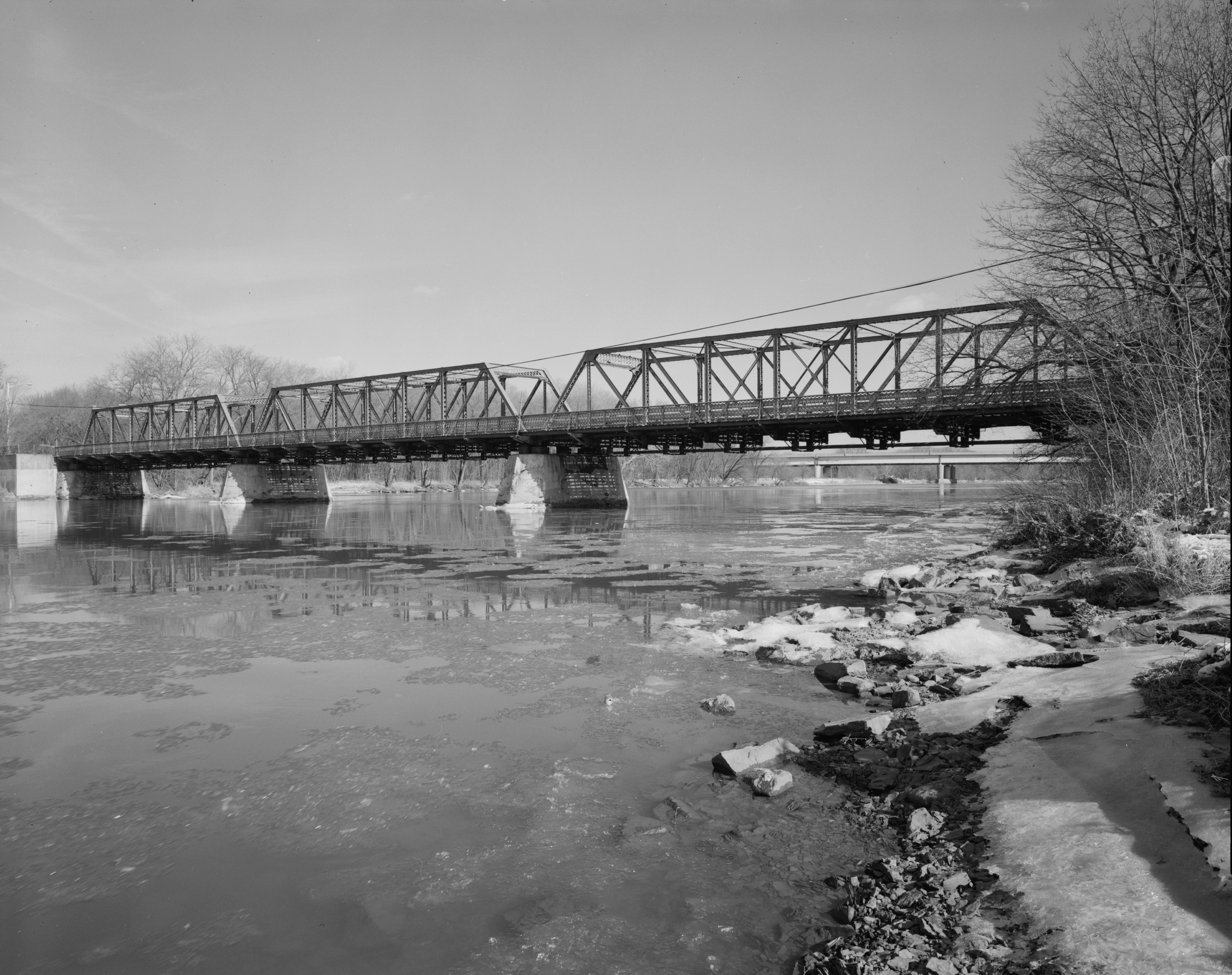
The original truss bridge in 1991

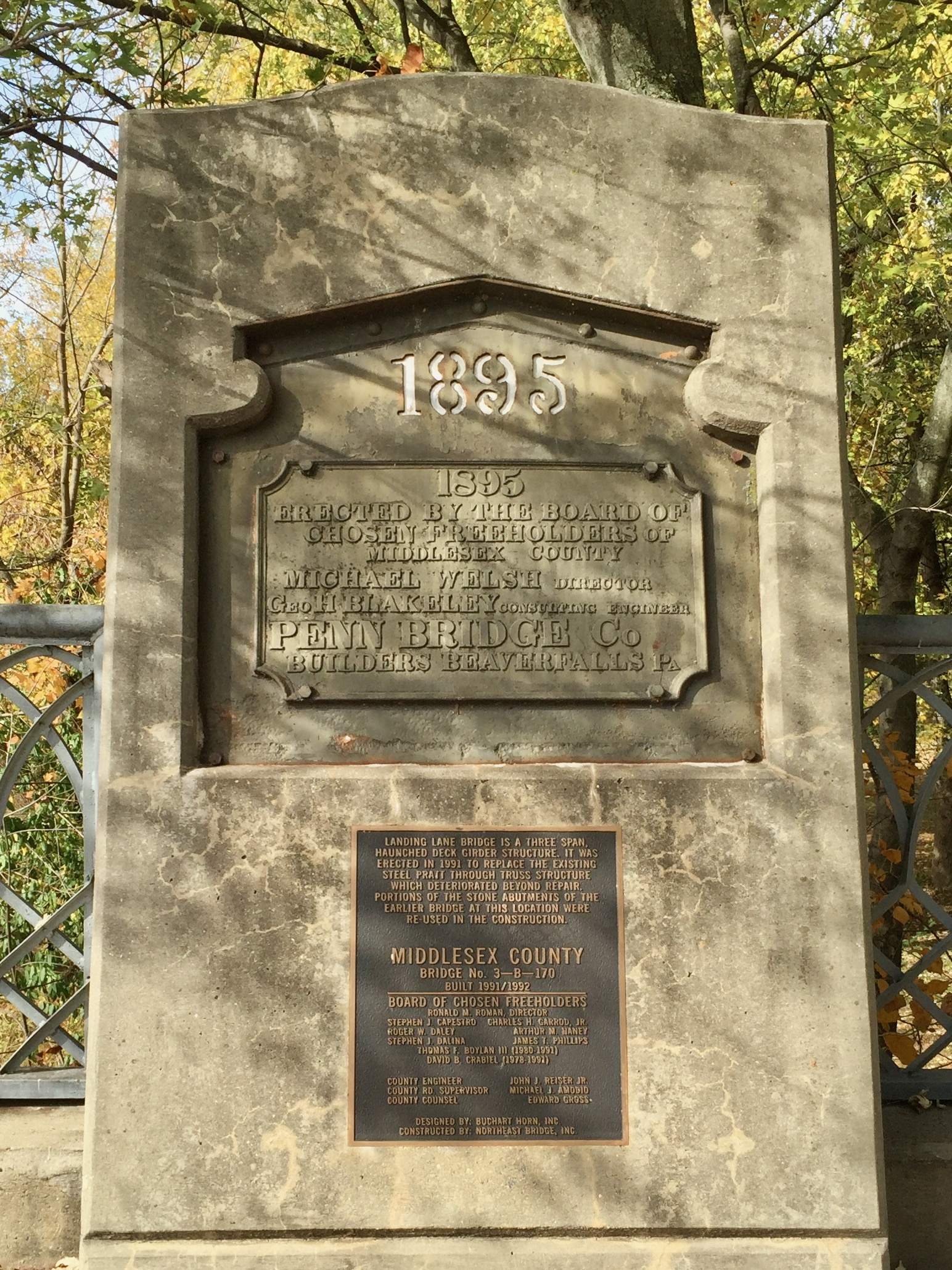
Plaque from the 1895 bridge

== See also ==
- List of bridges documented by the Historic American Engineering Record in New Jersey
- List of crossings of the Raritan River
