= Colonial Park Arboretum and Gardens =

Park and gardens in Franklin Township, New Jersey, United States

Coordinates: 40.5090°N 74.5741°W

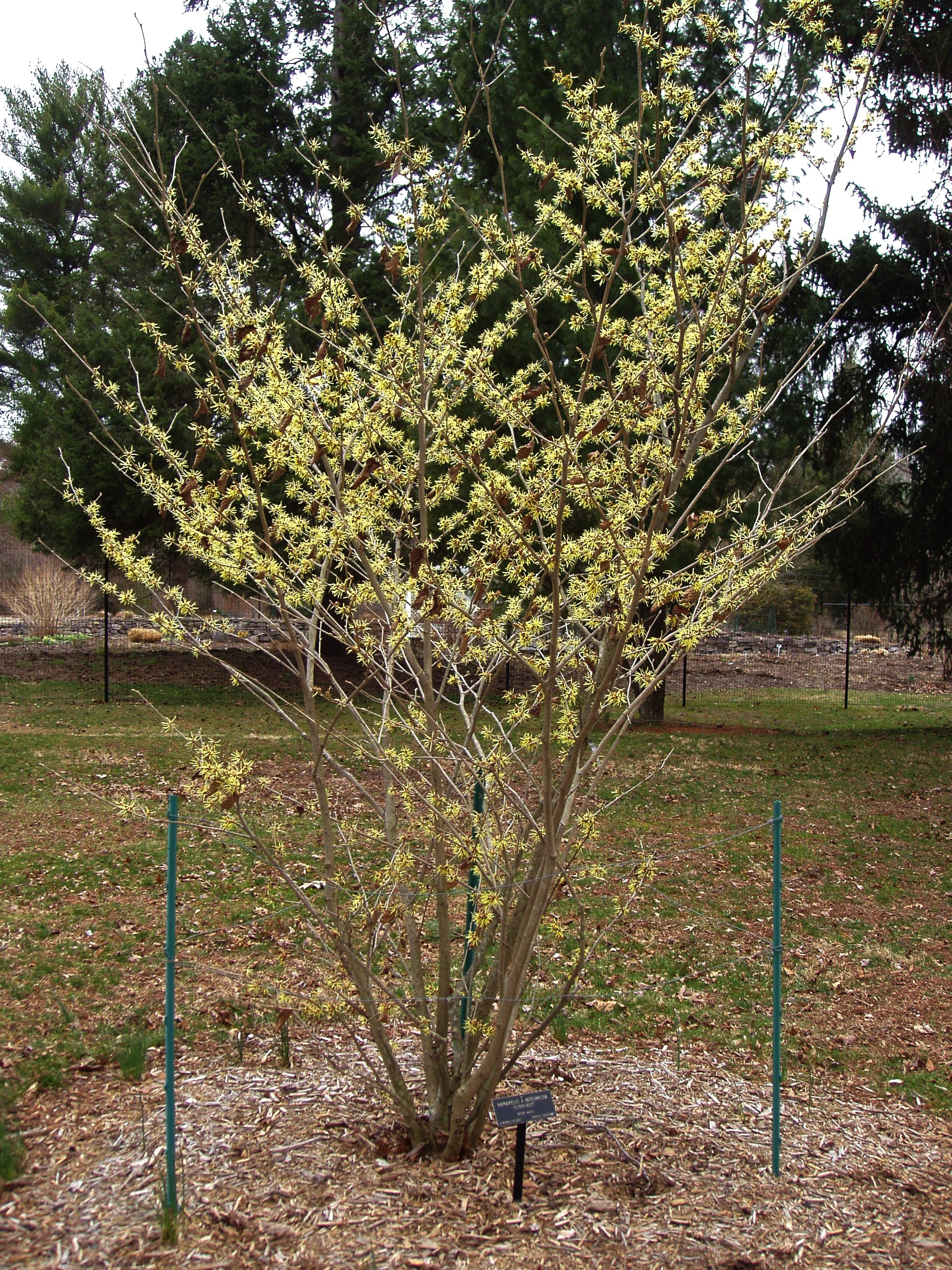
- Flowering Hamamelis onsite.
- Interactive map of Colonial Park Arboretum and Gardens
- Website: Official website

The Colonial Park Arboretum and Gardens (144 acres) are gardens and an arboretum located in Colonial Park (651 acres), 150 Mettlers Road, in the East Millstone area of Franklin Township, in Somerset County, New Jersey. The grounds are open daily without fee.

The arboretum contains labeled specimens of flowering trees, evergreens, shade trees, dwarf conifers, and flowering shrubs. Some of the genera represented are Abies (firs), Acer (maples), Aesculus (buckeyes), Carpinus (ironwoods), Chamaecyparis (false cypress), Cedrus (cedars), Celtis (hackberries), Cephalotaxus (plum yews), Ilex (hollies), Juniperus (junipers), Picea (spruces), Pinus (pines), Quercus (oaks), and Sorbus (mountain ashes).

The arboretum area also contains several gardens: the Rudolf W. van der Goot Rose Garden, 1-acre (4,000 m^{2}) with more than 3,000 roses of 325 varieties; the Fragrance and Sensory Garden (1981); and the Perennial Garden (1976). The Delaware and Raritan Canal passes along one side of the arboretum.

== See also ==
- List of botanical gardens in the United States
