= Delaware and Raritan Canal =

Canal in central New Jersey

- U.S. National Register of Historic Places
- U.S. Historic district
- New Jersey Register of Historic Places
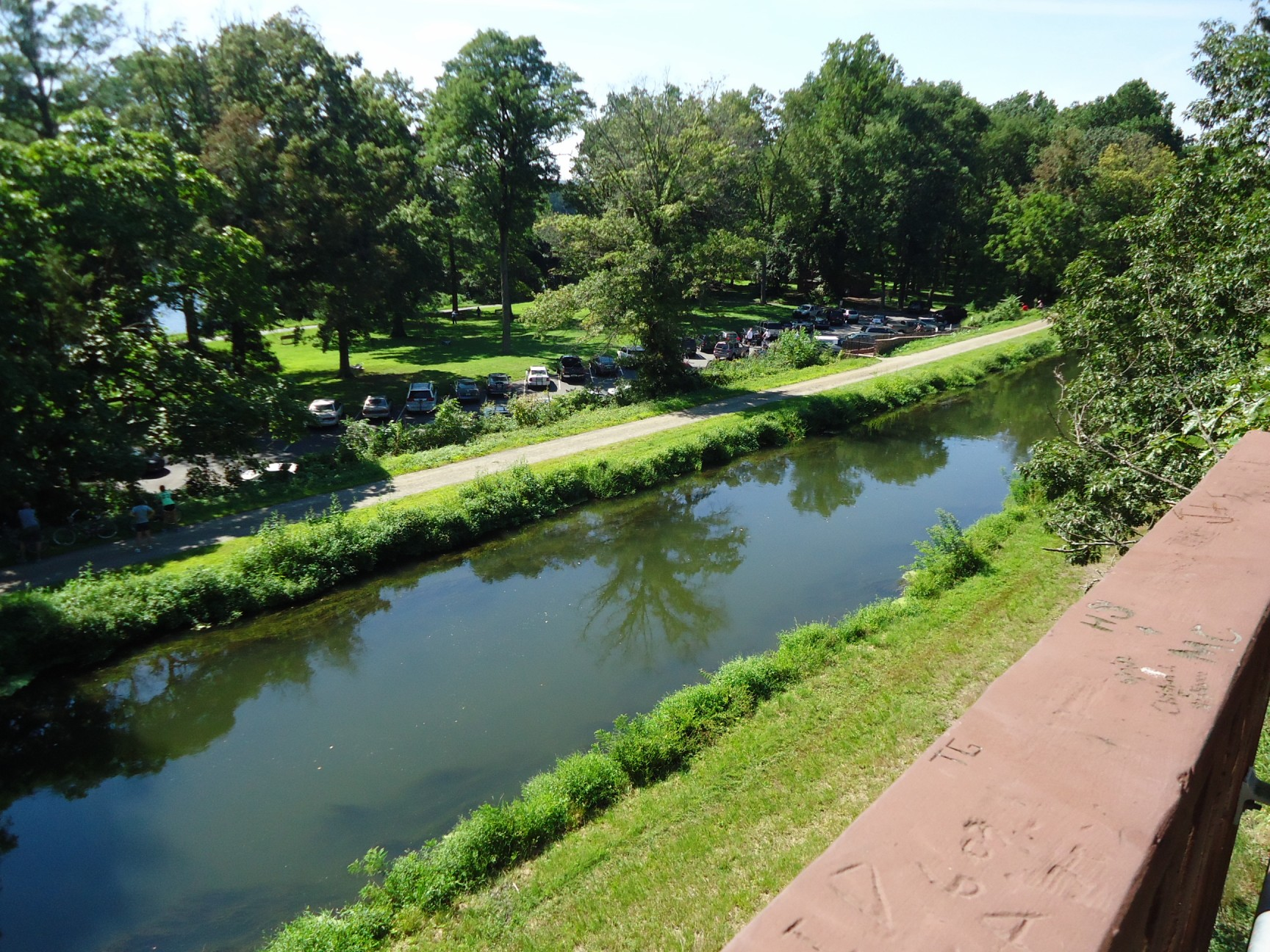
- A section of the canal as seen from a footbridge in 2013
- Location: New Jersey, U.S.
- Built: 1834
- NRHP reference No.: 73001105
- NJRHP No.: 1600

Significant dates
- Added to NRHP: May 11, 1973
- Designated NJRHP: November 30, 1972

The Delaware and Raritan Canal (D&R Canal) is a canal in central New Jersey, built in the 1830s, that connects the Delaware River to the Raritan River. It was an efficient and reliable means of transportation of freight between Philadelphia and New York City, transporting anthracite coal from eastern Pennsylvania during much of the 19th and early 20th centuries. A part of the historic Intracoastal Waterway, the canal allowed shippers to cut many miles off the existing route from the Pennsylvania Coal Region down the Delaware, around Cape May, and up the occasionally treacherous Atlantic Ocean coast to New York City.

== History ==
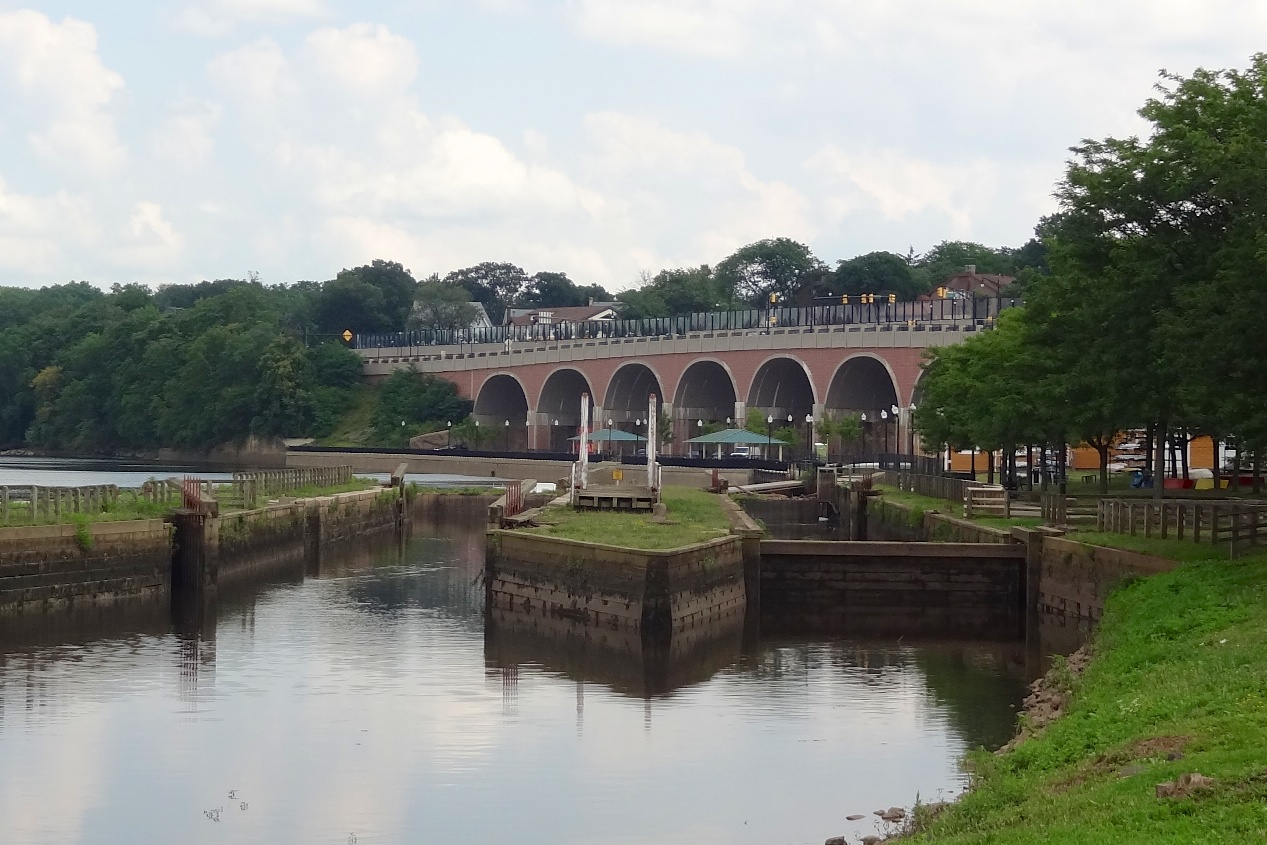
The canal's terminus in New Brunswick, New Jersey

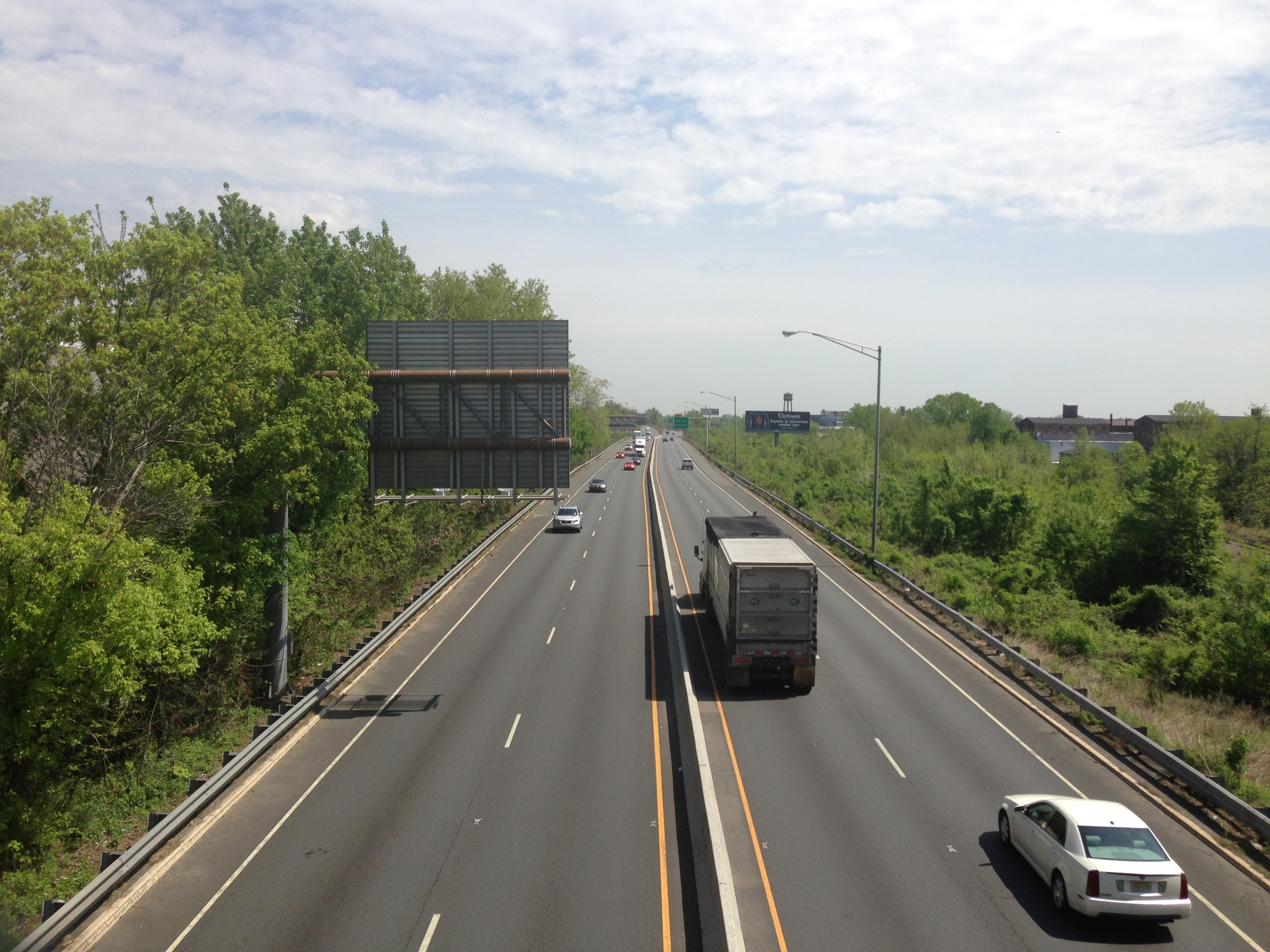
This section of the Trenton Freeway was built directly over the canal, which still flows underneath

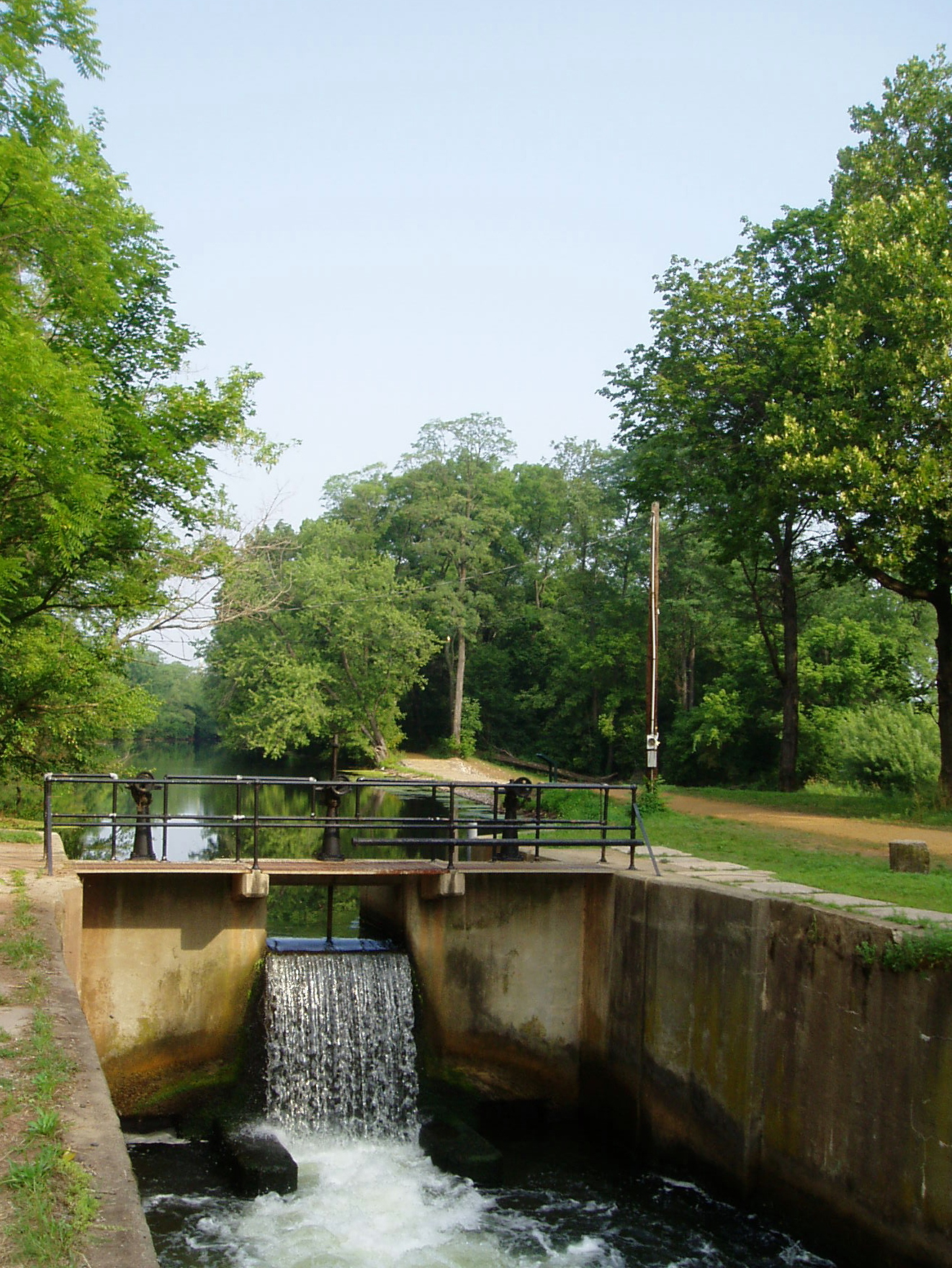
The canal lock with a dam constructed in place of the upper gate, 2005

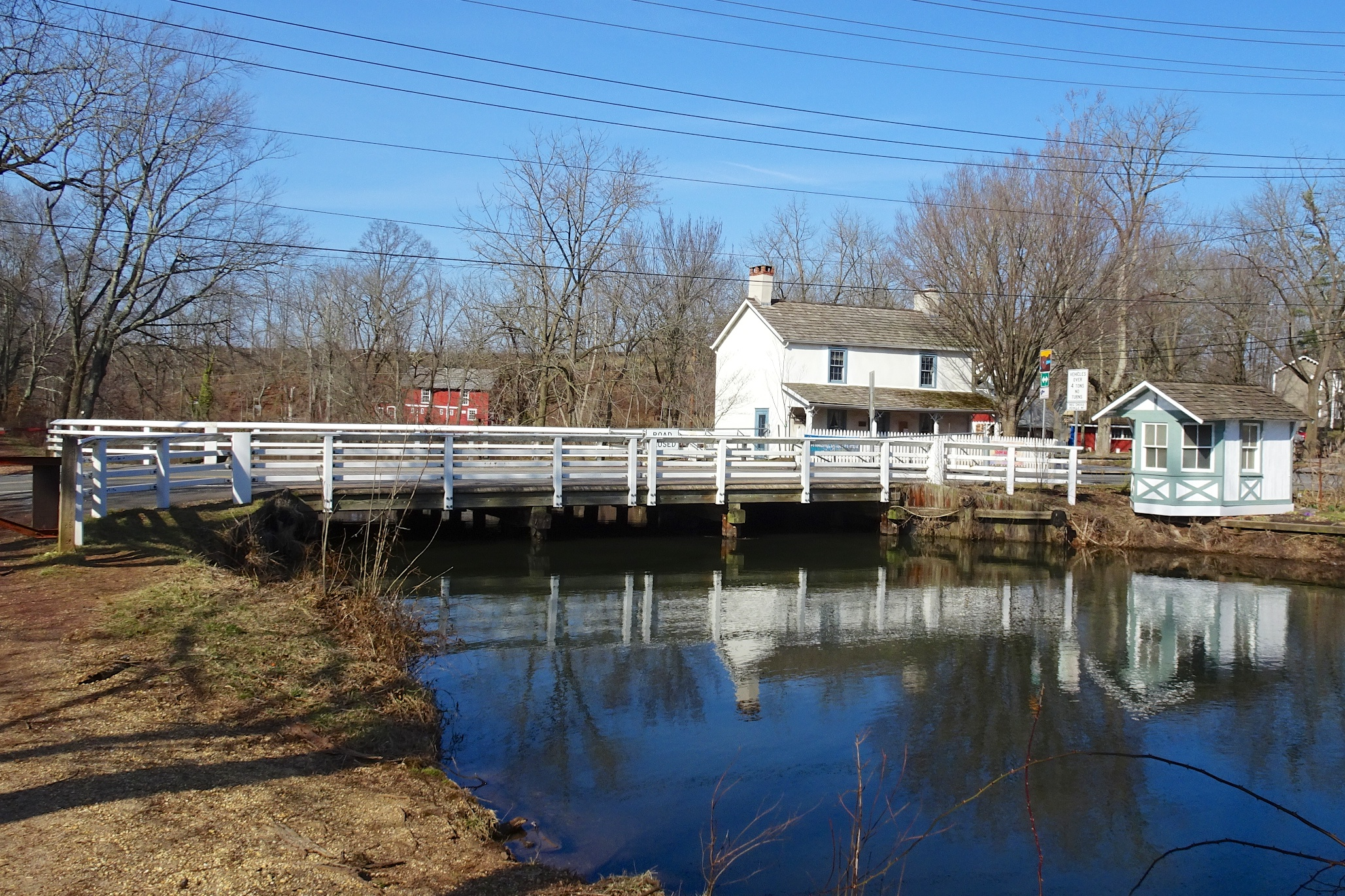
Bridge tender's house and bridge in Blackwells Mills, New Jersey

The idea of a canal between the Raritan and Delaware Rivers originated with William Penn, the founder of Pennsylvania, who suggested it in the 1690s. Such a canal would shorten the journey from Philadelphia to New York City by 100 miles, and relieve the need for boats to venture into the Atlantic Ocean.

At its peak in the 1860s, the canal transported over two million tons of cargo annually, primarily anthracite coal, and was officially listed on the National Register of Historic Places in 1980.

=== 19th century ===
In 1816, the New Jersey General Assembly created a commission of three people, including John Rutherfurd, a former United States Senator and a major landowner in New Jersey, which was authorized to survey and map a proposed route for a canal. Rutherfurd engaged John Randel Jr. to do the survey; Rutherfurd knew Randel from his work on the New York City Commissioners' Plan of 1811, for which Rutherfurd was one of the commissioners, and Randel was the chief surveyor. The route was to be "a level line as far as was practicable from Longbridge farm to the Delaware, and to the Raritan, in the shortest direction that the ground would admit, which line should be run with the greatest accuracy, and be esteemed the base line of the work." Randel spent two months surveying this route and, with the aid of a millwright, estimating water flow. They came to the conclusion that the canal would require less than an eighteenth of the water passing through the local streams, which would still leave enough water flow for local mills. Despite Randel's report, and the clear advantage of having such a canal, the opposition to the project managed to keep anything from happening until 1830.

On February 4, 1830, the New Jersey legislature passed legislation that created the charter for the D&R Canal. The charter for the Camden and Amboy Rail Road and Transportation Company was passed the same day. The D&R charter allocated $1.5 million of stock for construction which was required to be completed within eight years. The canal was to be considered a public highway although the corporation would be allowed to collect tolls and transit duties for passengers and cargo transported along the canal.

The canal was almost not dug due to the lack of subscriptions. When that occurred, Robert F. Stockton, the grandson of Richard Stockton, a signer of the Declaration of Independence, pledged his and his family's personal fortune to continue the work. The canal system was dug mostly by hand tools, mostly by Irish immigrants. Work began in 1830 and was completed in 1834, at an estimated cost of $2,830,000, equal to $91,267,500 today. When the canal first opened, before the steam engine was developed, teams of mules were used to tow canal boats through it.

The canal's greatest usage occurred during the 1860s and 1870s when it was used primarily to transport coal from Pennsylvania to New York City during the American Industrial Revolution. On May 18, 1872, the D&R Canal Company was merged with several parallel railroads into the United New Jersey Railroad and Canal Company and leased by the Pennsylvania Railroad.

=== 20th century ===
D&R Canal's importance waned as railroads were used to perform, more rapidly, the same function as canals, but it remained in operation until 1932. Years later, the section between Trenton and Bordentown was filled for various road and rail projects, leaving the feeder waters to solely supply the main canal from Trenton, New Jersey north to New Brunswick. Two other sections of the canal were piped underground: one in Trenton when the Trenton Freeway was constructed in 1952, and the other in New Brunswick when the Elmer Boyd Parkway Extension (Route 18) was constructed in 1984.

== Route ==
The main section of the canal runs from Bordentown on the Delaware River to New Brunswick on the Raritan. A feeder canal section (which feeds water into the main canal) stretches 22 miles (35 km) northward from Trenton, upstream along the east bank of the Delaware to Bulls Island near Frenchtown. The feeder canal collects water from higher elevations to the north, and feeds it to the highest section of the main canal, which flows generally north and east to the end, and had flowed south into the Crosswicks Creek at Bordentown. The total length of the entire canal system was approximately 66 miles (106 km). The main section was 44 miles (71 km) long, 75 feet (23 m) wide and 8 feet (2.4 m) deep; the feeder was 22 miles (35 km) long, 60 feet (18 m) wide and 6 feet (1.8 m) deep.

=== Altered and abandoned sections ===
The southern branch of the D&R Canal in Trenton was filled in by a W.P.A. project along the Trenton Freeway (now U.S. Route 1) to Lalor Street, while the northeastern branch was covered over and continues to flow beneath the surface. The portion of the canal that provided access to the Delaware River in Bordentown is also abandoned. In Trenton it has been covered by Route 129, which opened in 1996. Another section south of Trenton is located in Hamilton Township, New Jersey between the southern boundary of Trenton and the Crosswicks Creek.

The surviving, easternmost lock is also severed from the canal by Route 18 in New Brunswick.

=== Locks and spillways ===
Locks were used to overcome elevation differences along the D&R canal. Many of the locks are still present along the canal route; however, the lock gates have been replaced on the upstream side with small dams and water outfalls. The downstream gates have been removed, so the water in the locks is level with the water on the downstream side. Some of the locks have been buried or removed due to construction projects in the vicinity of the canal.

A number of spillways, which drained excess water from the canal into nearby waterways during periods of heavy flow, are located along the canal route. Spillways are evident as a dip in the towpath along the canal. Some have paving stones spaced closely enough for mules to walk, but are impassable for bicycles.

== Associated rivers ==
- Delaware River: Feeds the Delaware and Raritan Canal via a feeder canal that approaches from the north along the east bank of the Delaware River, starting at Bulls Island, to the southern terminus of the D&R Canal near Trenton.
- Millstone River: Parallels the Delaware and Raritan Canal from Princeton north to Manville.
- Raritan River: Parallels the Delaware and Raritan Canal from Manville north and east to New Brunswick. The northern terminus of the Delaware and Raritan Canal is in New Brunswick.

== Landmark ==
The Delaware and Raritan Canal was added to the National Register of Historic Places on May 11, 1973. The many historic canal houses where the bridge tenders have lived (such as the Blackwells Mills Canal House and the Port Mercer Canal House) were listed as contributing properties.

== State Park ==
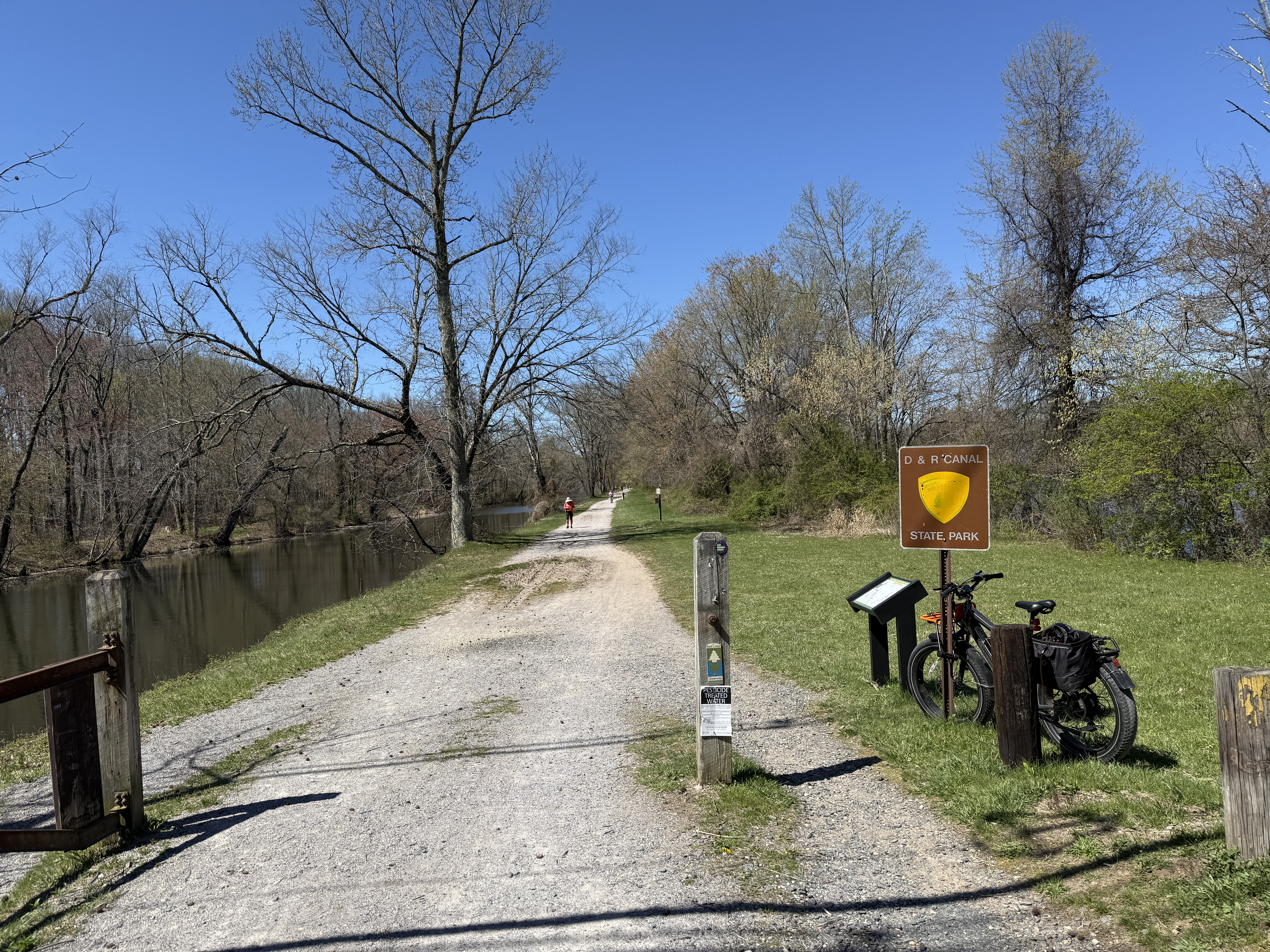
Delaware and Raritan Canal State Park in Princeton

In 1974, most of the canal system was declared a New Jersey state park. It is used for canoeing, kayaking, and fishing. A graded natural-surface trail along the side of the canal, which was the tow path that mules used to tow barges on the canal before steam powered barges, is now used for hiking, jogging, bicycling, and horseback riding. Some 36 miles (58 km) of the main canal, and all 22 miles (35 km) of the feeder canal, still exist. The feeder canal along the Delaware, being a former railroad rather than a towpath, is especially suited to bicycling. The park is operated and maintained by the New Jersey Division of Parks and Forestry.

The canal is accessible from many points along its route, with small parking areas providing access at most road crossings. One of the most scenic and popular sections of the D&R Canal state park is the segment along Lake Carnegie in Princeton, New Jersey, which features the canal on one side of the path and the lake on the other side. Another attractive section borders the Colonial Park Arboretum and Gardens in East Millstone.

When the canal was used for transportation, New Jersey's landscape was mostly rural, and its primary business was agriculture. In the words of Howard Green, research director of the New Jersey Historical Commission, "Now it is one of the most beloved parks in the state, a sinewy, snake-like greenway through one of the most heavily populated parts of the world. It has gone from being the machine in the garden, to being garden in the machine."

== Folklore ==
From 1972 onward, the canal developed a local legend. Residents of Griggstown, Franklin Township claimed to have seen a feral cow along the canal and the parallel Millstone River, said to be the ghost of one of many cows herded across and along the canal. The folklore endured for 30 years when, on November 23, 2002, an actual bull was found in a ditch, and was pulled out by local authorities only to be subsequently euthanized shortly afterward.

== Gallery ==
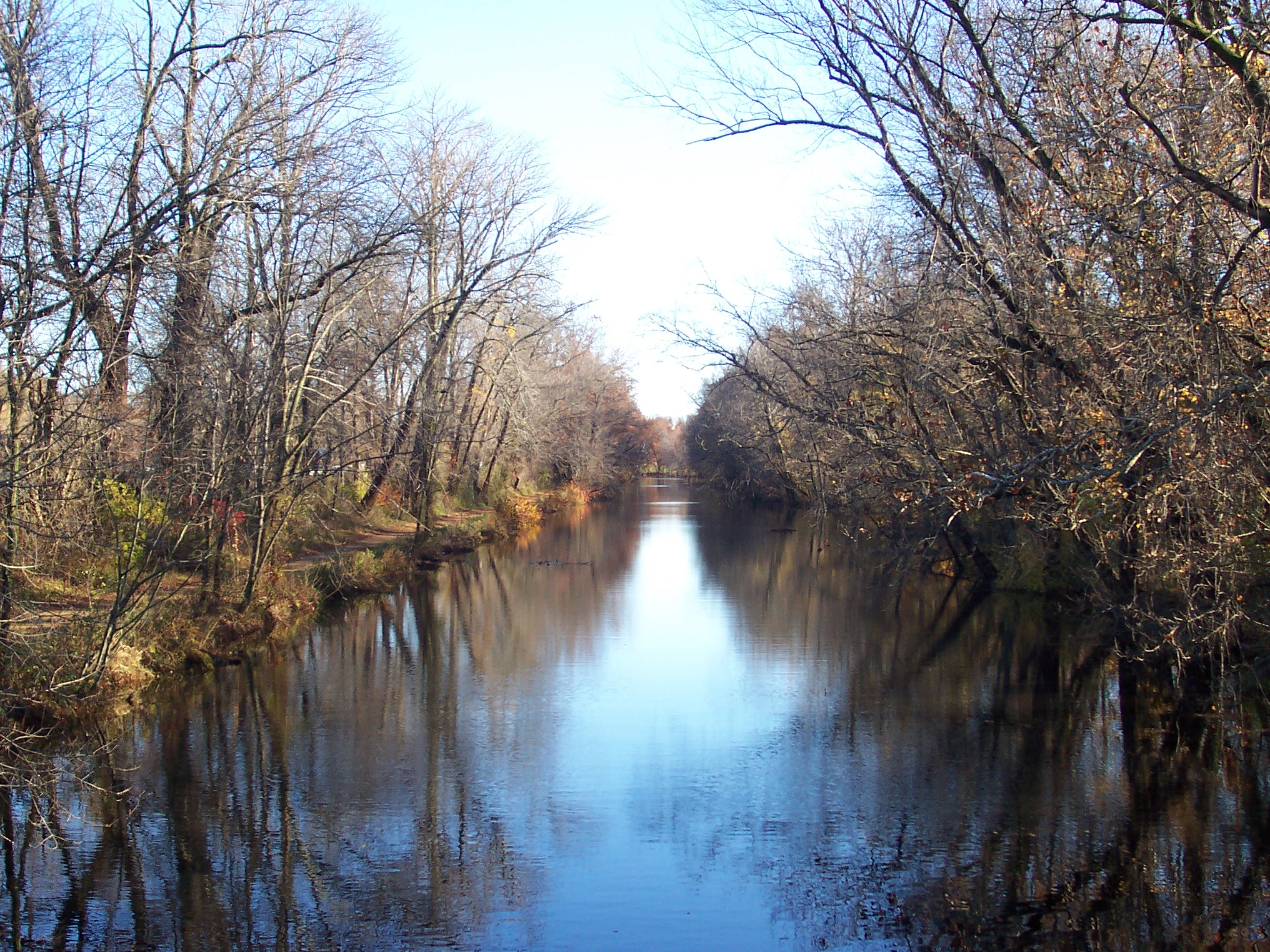
Rural area

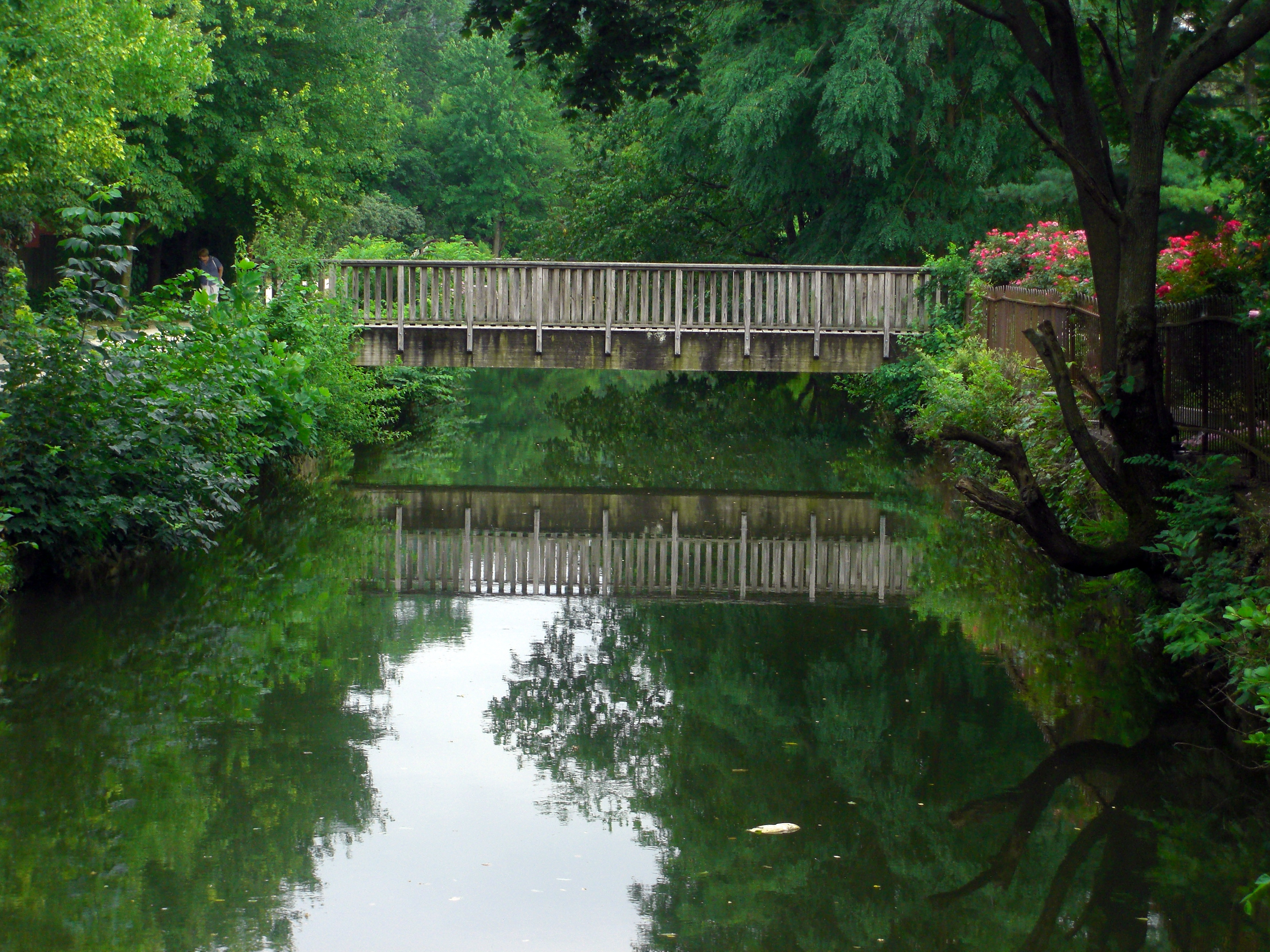
The feeder canal, Lambertville, New Jersey

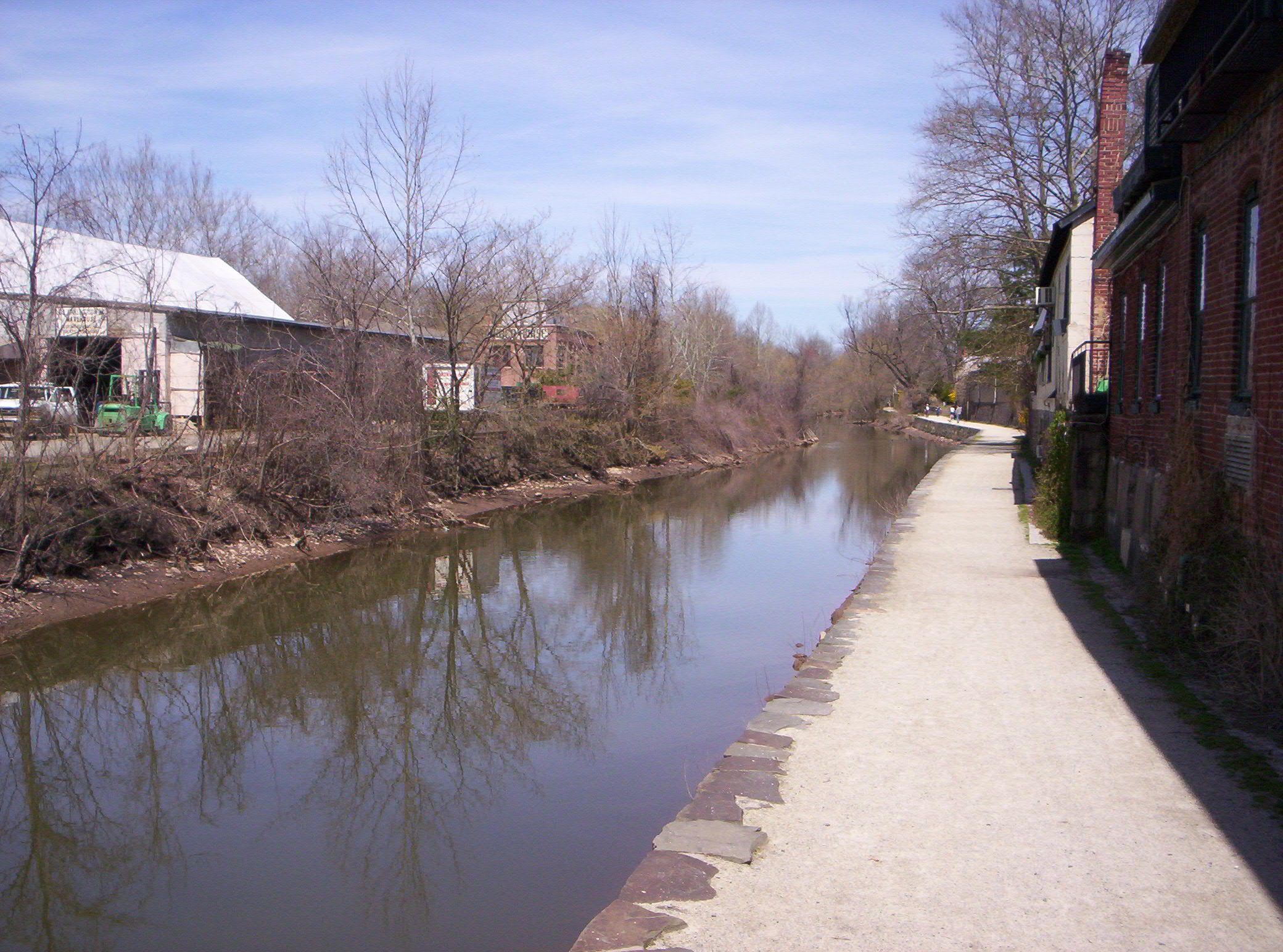
Another view from Lambertville

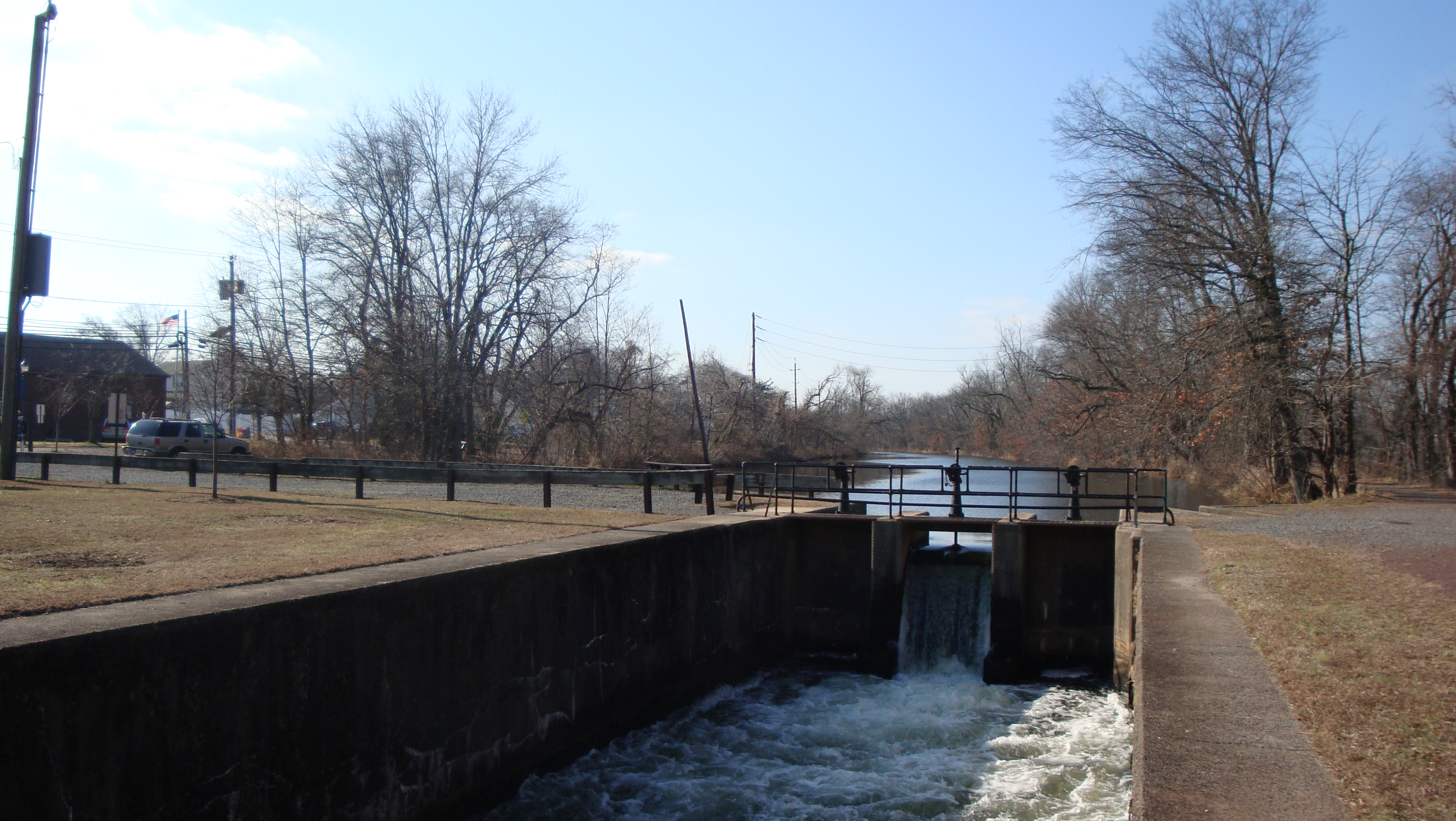
Raritan Canal at South Bound Brook

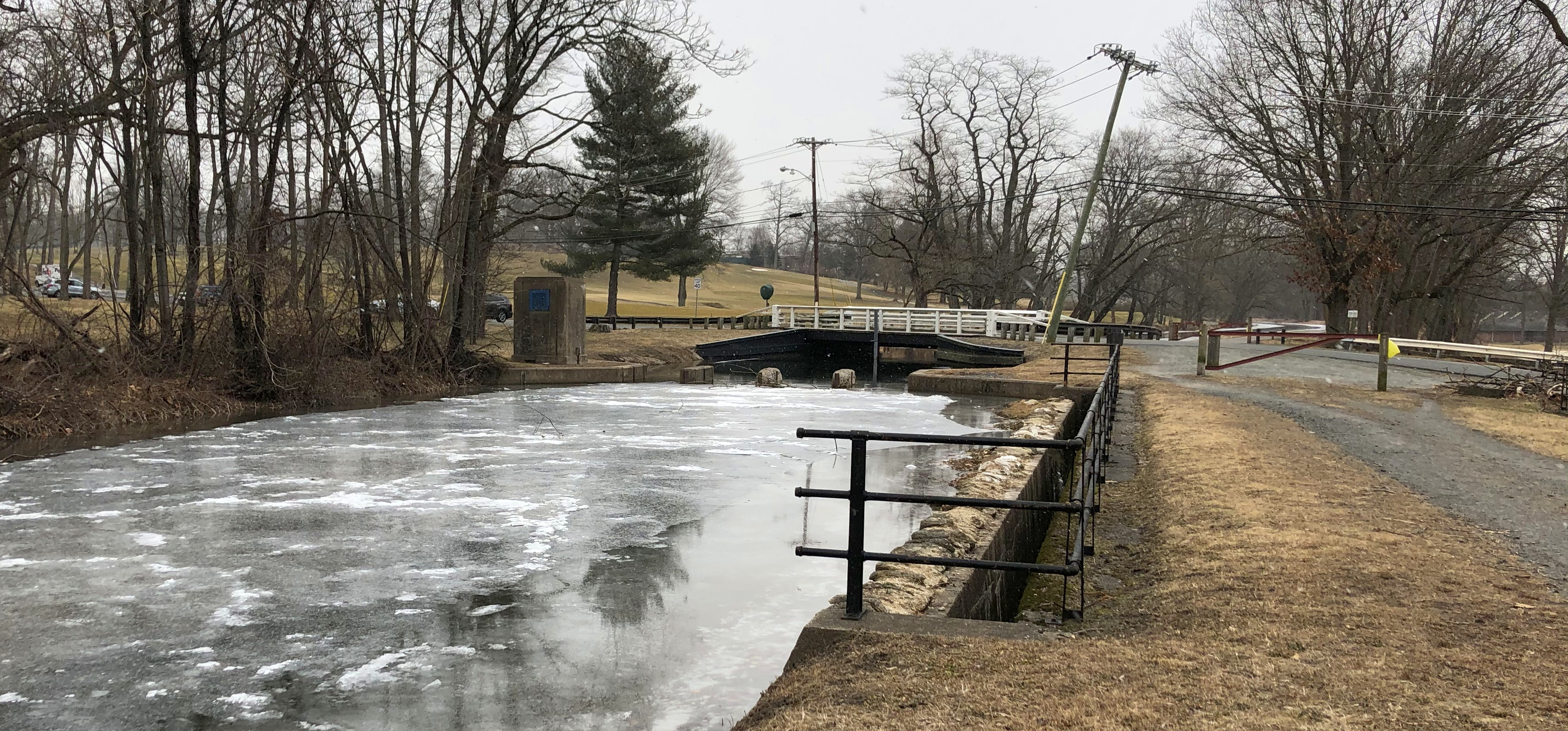
Parking area, lock, spillway and trail of the Delaware and Raritan Canal State Park, Ewing Township, NJ

== See also ==
- Raritan Landing
- Pennsylvania Canal (Delaware Division)

Preceded by	The Delaware and Raritan Canal Company chartered February 4, 1830 merged May 18, 1872	Succeeded by The United New Jersey Railroad and Canal Company
