= East Millstone, New Jersey =

Populated place in Somerset County, New Jersey, US

- Census-designated place
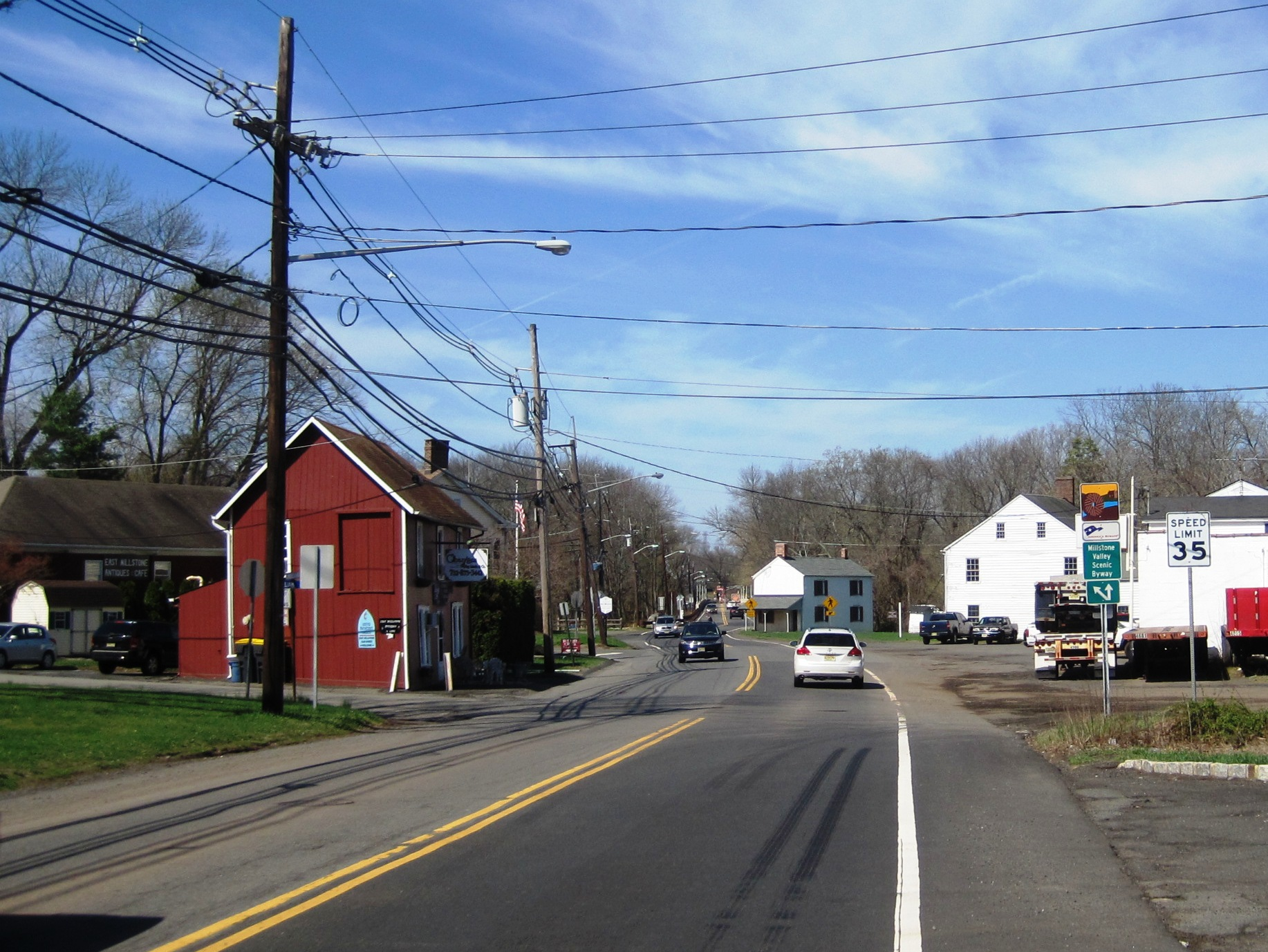
- East Millstone along Amwell Road (CR 514)

- Location in Somerset County Location in New Jersey Location in the United States
- Coordinates: 40.496445°N 74.565986°W
- Country: United States
- State: New Jersey
- County: Somerset
- Township: Franklin
- Incorporated: February 18, 1873
- Dissolved: December 31, 1949

Area
  - Total: 2.30 sq mi (5.95 km^{2})
  - Land: 2.23 sq mi (5.78 km^{2})
  - Water: 0.062 sq mi (0.16 km^{2}) 2.70%
- Elevation: 85 ft (26 m)

Population (2020)
  - Total: 588
  - Density: 263.3/sq mi (101.65/km^{2})
- Time zone: UTC−05:00 (Eastern (EST))
  - Summer (DST): UTC−04:00 (Eastern (EDT))
- Area codes: 609/640 and 732/848
- FIPS code: 34-19330
- GNIS feature ID: 02583985

East Millstone is an unincorporated community and census-designated place (CDP) located in Franklin Township in Somerset County, in the U.S. state of New Jersey.

As of the 2020 census, East Millstone had a population of 588. It is a small rural community that grew and prospered with a small industrial base in the 19th century, centered on the Delaware and Raritan Canal at Amwell Road and the long-abandoned Millstone and New Brunswick Railroad that terminated in East Millstone. East Millstone was an independent municipality from 1873 to 1949. The East Millstone Historic District was listed on the National Register of Historic Places in 1983.

== History ==
East Millstone existed as an independent municipality for more than 75 years. It was incorporated as a town by an act of the New Jersey Legislature on February 18, 1873, from portions of Franklin Township, and existed on its own until December 31, 1949, when it was returned to Franklin Township. The residents voted 119–28 in favor of dissolution on March 9, 1949.

The independent municipality of Millstone, New Jersey, a borough which is not part of Franklin Township, is located across the Millstone River, which is directly west of the Delaware and Raritan Canal.

East Millstone maintains its rural character into the 21st century, with a firehouse, a post office and just a handful of local businesses. The housing stock is also quite old, with no new development in the East Millstone section of Franklin Township in recent years.

== Historic district ==
- East Millstone Historic District
- U.S. National Register of Historic Places
- U.S. Historic district
- New Jersey Register of Historic Places
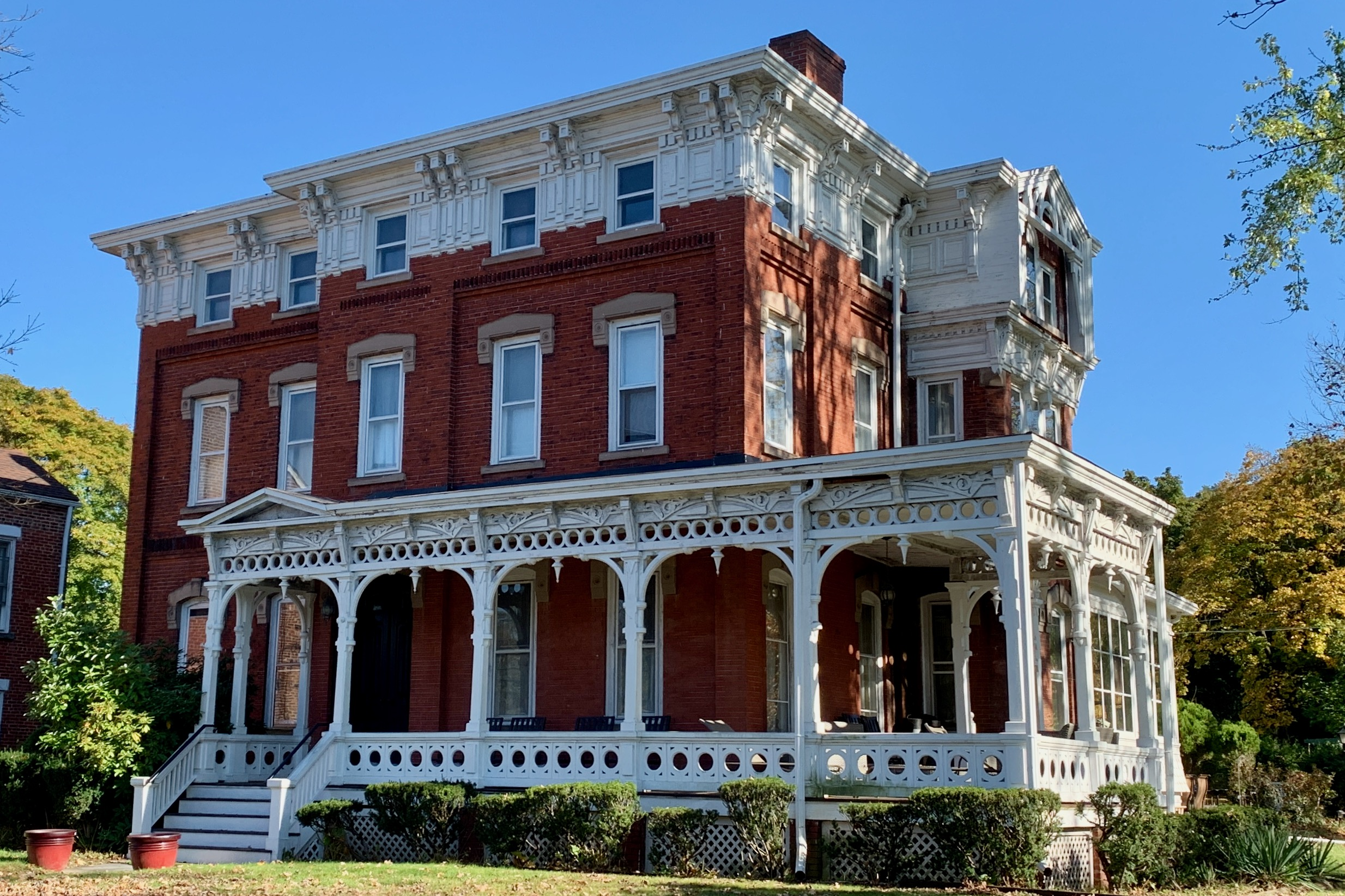
- Historic Shimalla House est. 1970
- Location: Amwell Road and Delaware & Raritan Canal
- Area: 62 acres (25 ha)
- Architectural style: Greek Revival, Late Victorian, Federal
- NRHP reference No.: 83001613
- NJRHP No.: 2494

Significant dates
- Added to NRHP: March 17, 1983
- Designated NJRHP: February 3, 1983

The East Millstone Historic District is a historic district encompassing the village. It was added to the National Register of Historic Places on March 17, 1983, for its significance in architecture, commerce, industry, and transportation. It includes 109 contributing buildings. The Franklin Inn, historically known as the Van Liew Farmhouse, is among the oldest houses in the village.

== Geography ==
According to the U.S. Census Bureau, East Millstone had a total area of 2.296 square miles (5.946 km^{2}), including 2.234 square miles (5.785 km^{2}) of land and 0.062 square miles (0.161 km^{2}) of water (2.70%).

== Demographics ==
Historical population
Census	Pop.	Note	%±
1880	432		—
1890	475		10.0%
1900	447		−5.9%
1910	356		−20.4%
1920	427		19.9%
1930	364		−14.8%
1940	387		6.3%
2010	579		—
2020	588		1.6%
Population sources: 1880-1890 1890-1910; 1910-1930 1920-1940; 2010 2020

East Millstone first appeared as a census designated place in the 2010 U.S. census.

=== 2020 census ===
East Millstone CDP, New Jersey – Racial and ethnic composition Note: the US Census treats Hispanic/Latino as an ethnic category. This table excludes Latinos from the racial categories and assigns them to a separate category. Hispanics/Latinos may be of any race.
Race / Ethnicity (NH = Non-Hispanic)	Pop 2010	Pop 2020	% 2010	% 2020
White alone (NH)	441	379	76.17%	64.46%
Black or African American alone (NH)	60	47	10.36%	7.99%
Native American or Alaska Native alone (NH)	0	1	0.00%	0.17%
Asian alone (NH)	45	105	7.77%	17.86%
Native Hawaiian or Pacific Islander alone (NH)	0	0	0.00%	0.00%
Other race alone (NH)	0	1	0.00%	0.17%
Mixed race or Multiracial (NH)	16	21	2.76%	3.57%
Hispanic or Latino (any race)	17	34	2.94%	5.78%
Total	579	588	100.00%	100.00%

=== 2010 census ===
The 2010 United States census counted 579 people, 233 households, and 161 families in the CDP. The population density was 259.2 per square mile (100.1/km^{2}). There were 246 housing units at an average density of 110.1 per square mile (42.5/km^{2}). The racial makeup was 78.58% (455) White, 10.54% (61) Black or African American, 0.00% (0) Native American, 7.77% (45) Asian, 0.00% (0) Pacific Islander, 0.35% (2) from other races, and 2.76% (16) from two or more races. Hispanic or Latino of any race were 2.94% (17) of the population.

Of the 233 households, 23.6% had children under the age of 18; 60.5% were married couples living together; 6.0% had a female householder with no husband present and 30.9% were non-families. Of all households, 22.7% were made up of individuals and 5.2% had someone living alone who was 65 years of age or older. The average household size was 2.48 and the average family size was 2.94.

16.4% of the population were under the age of 18, 5.0% from 18 to 24, 23.1% from 25 to 44, 39.6% from 45 to 64, and 15.9% who were 65 years of age or older. The median age was 47.5 years. For every 100 females, the population had 101.7 males. For every 100 females ages 18 and older there were 99.2 males.

== Gallery ==
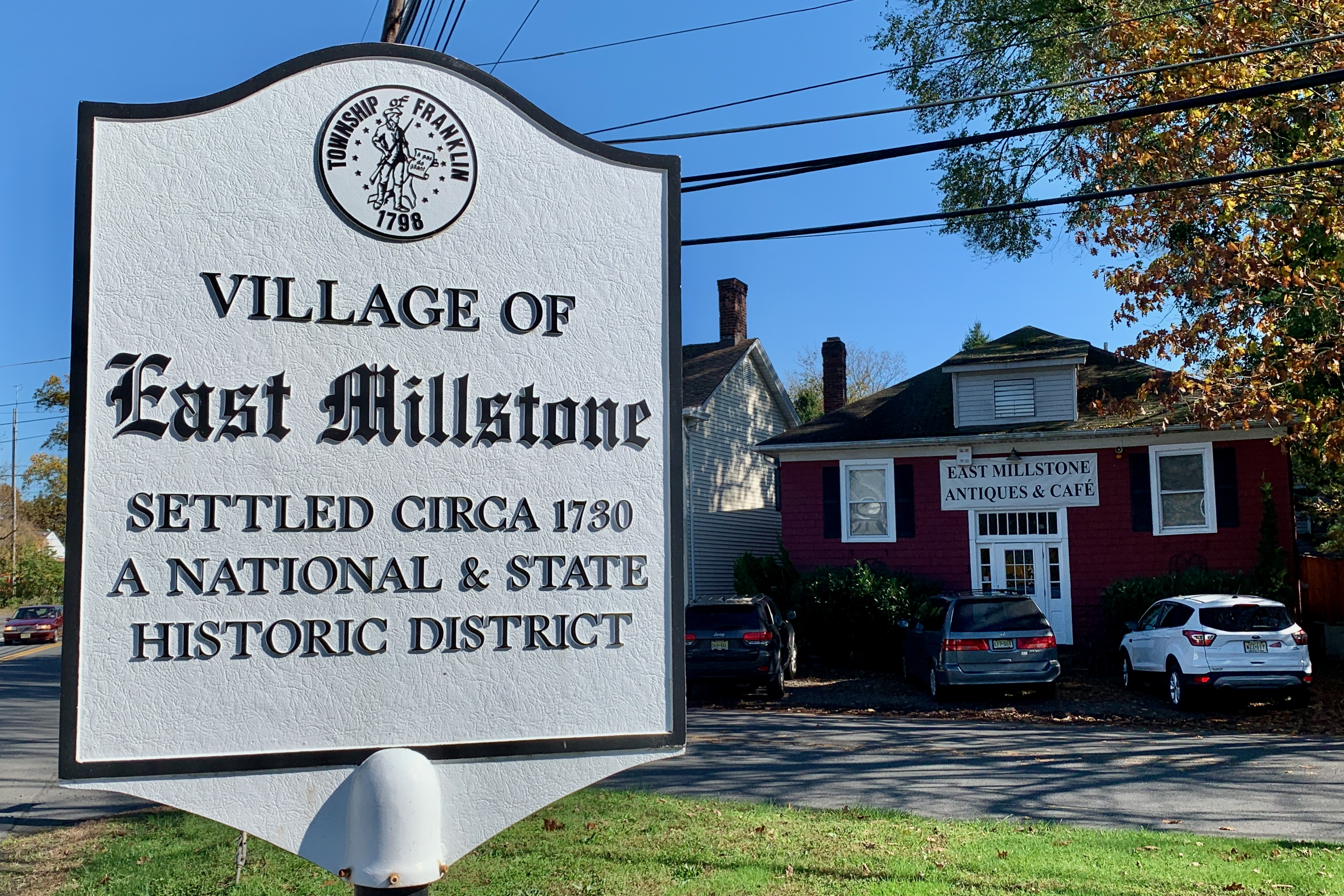
Historic district

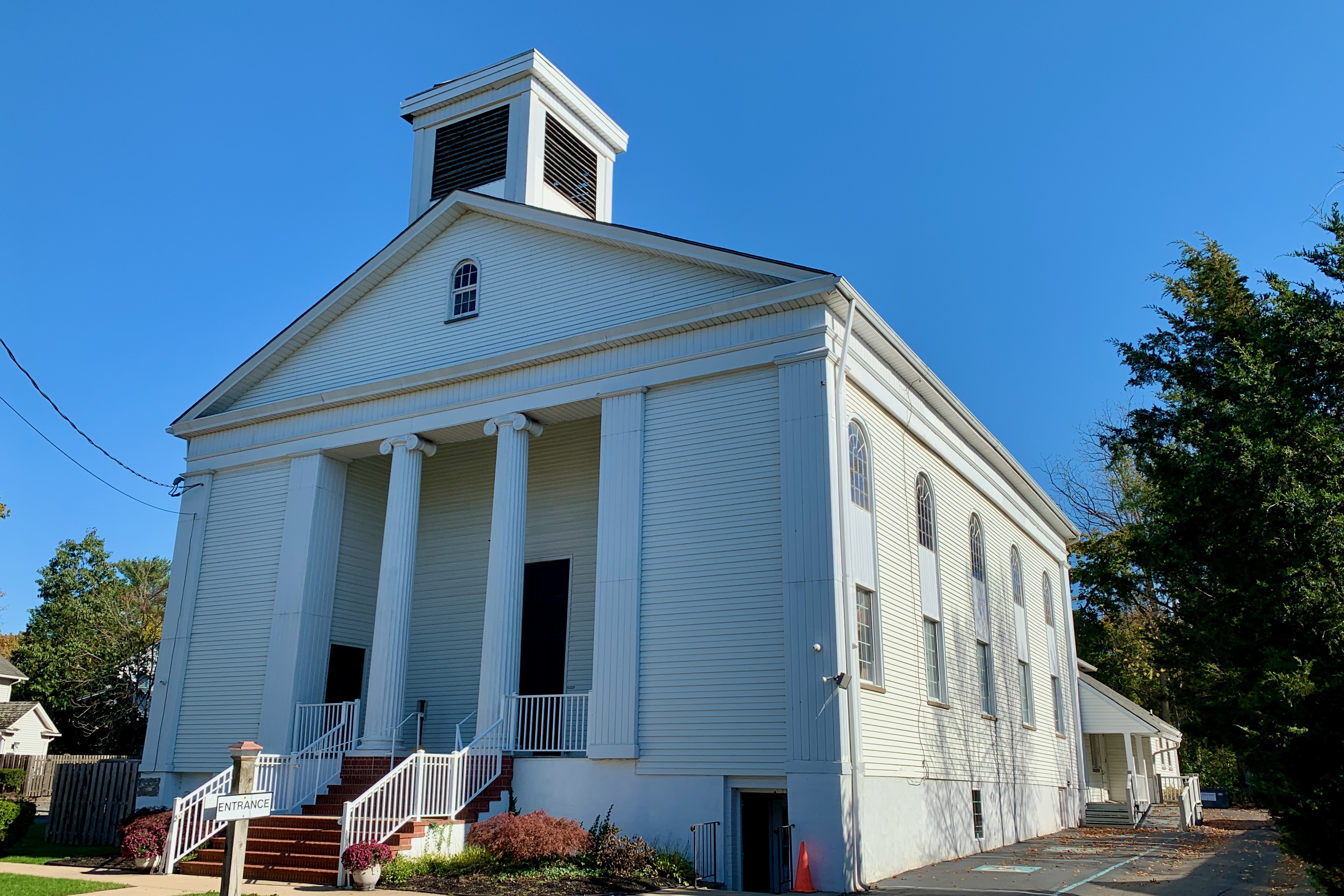
Calvary Community Church

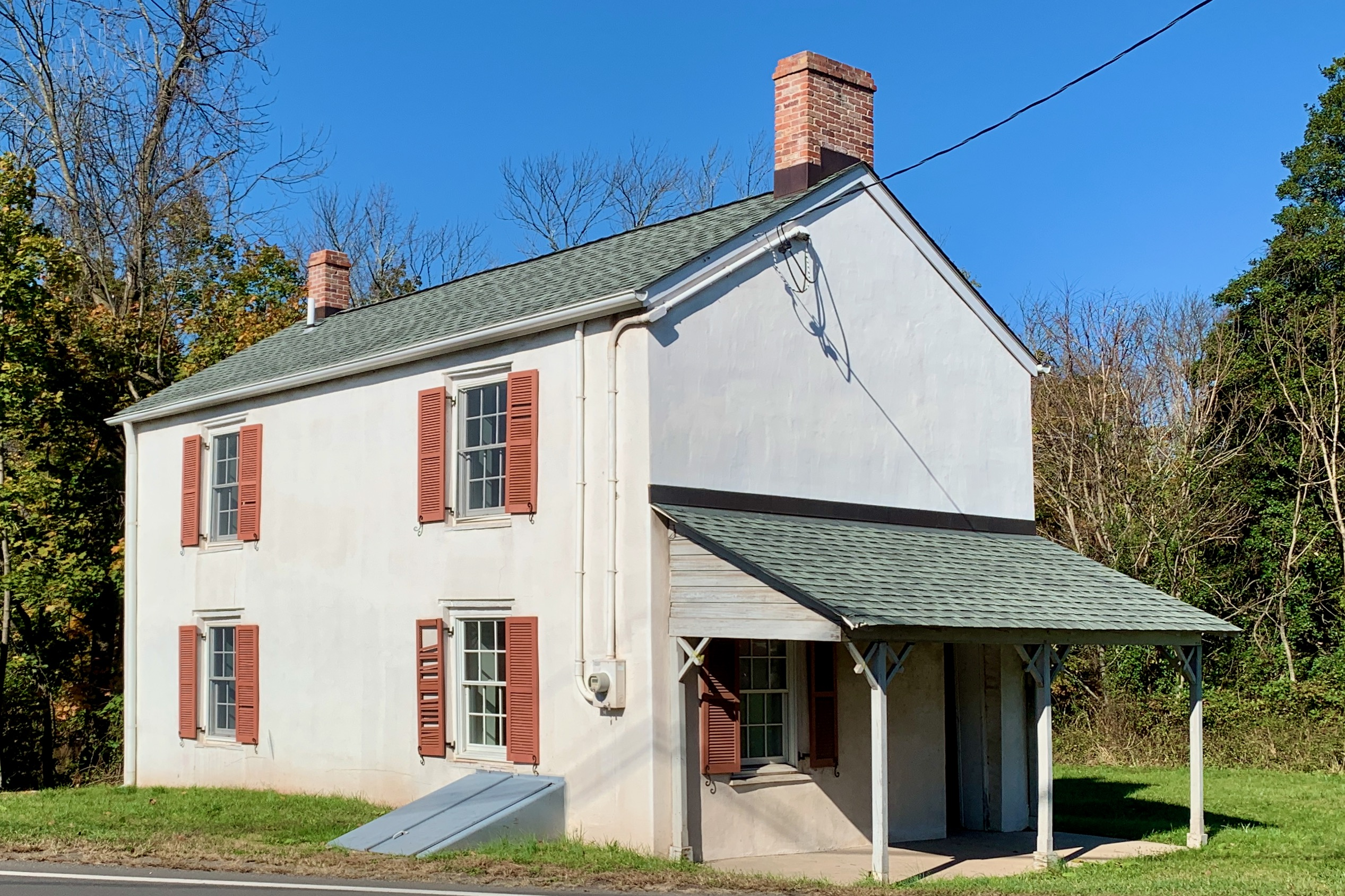
Bridge Tender's House for the Delaware and Raritan Canal

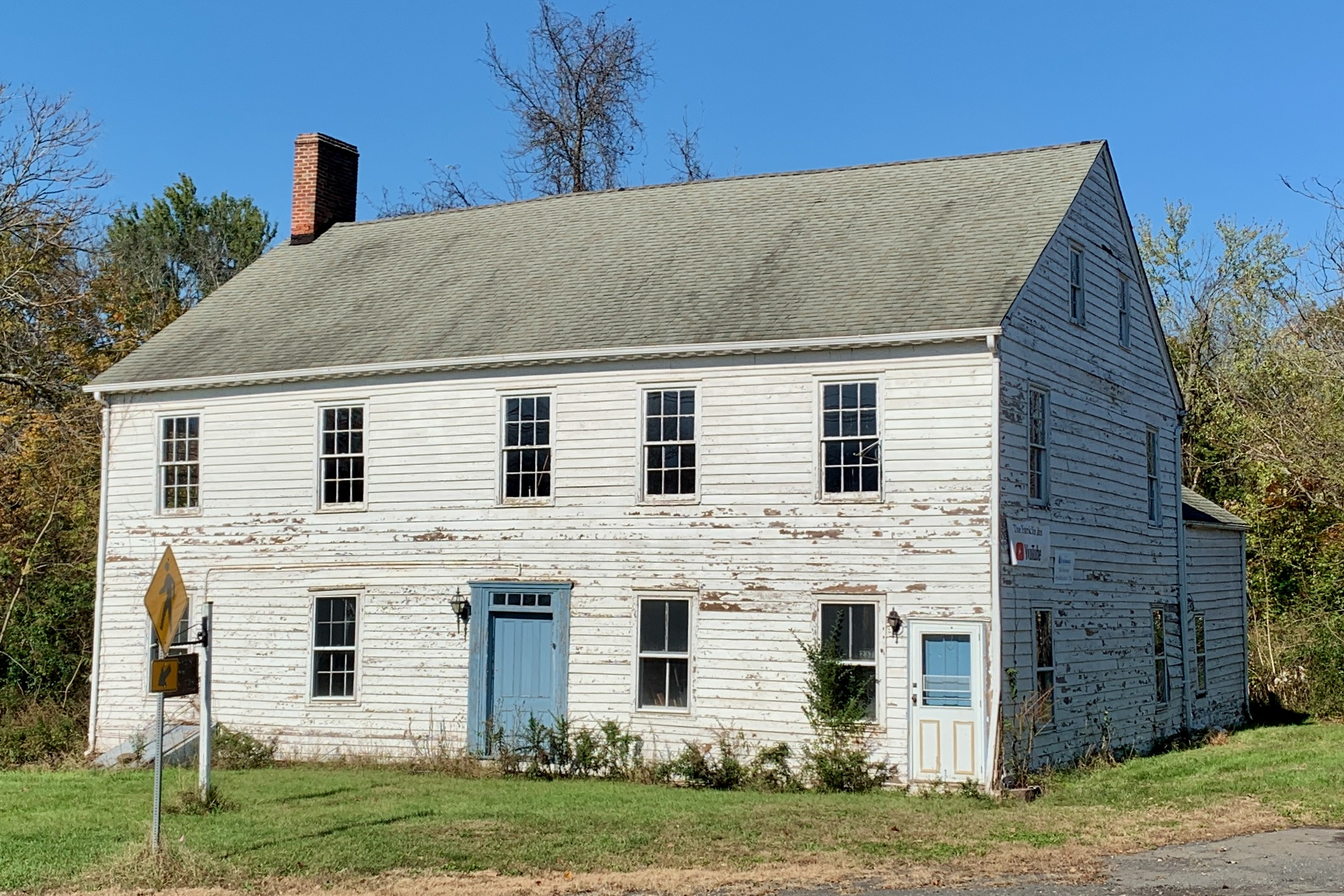
Franklin Inn
