= Franklin Township Public Schools (Somerset County, New Jersey) =

School district in Somerset County, New Jersey, US

Address
- 1755 Amwell Road Somerset, Somerset County, New Jersey, 08873; United States
- Coordinates: 40.497711°N 74.528562°W

District information
- Grades: Pre-K-12
- Superintendent: Jamil Maroun
- Business administrator: Brian Bonanno
- Schools: 10

Students and staff
- Enrollment: 7,352 (as of 2023–24)
- Faculty: 684.8 FTEs
- Student–teacher ratio: 10.7:1

Other information
- District Factor Group: GH
- Website: www.franklinboe.org
Ind.	Per pupil	District spending	Rank (*)	K-12 average	%± vs. average
1A	Total Spending	$19,864	72	$18,891	5.2%
1	Budgetary Cost	14,080	44	14,783	−4.8%
2	Classroom Instruction	7,929	18	8,763	−9.5%
6	Support Services	2,488	67	2,392	4.0%
8	Administrative Cost	1,498	60	1,485	0.9%
10	Operations & Maintenance	1,909	76	1,783	7.1%
13	Extracurricular Activities	223	42	268	−16.8%
16	Median Teacher Salary	57,800	14	64,043
Data from NJDoE 2014 Taxpayers' Guide to Education Spending. *Of K-12 districts with more than 3,500 students. Lowest spending=1; Highest=103

The Franklin Township Public Schools is a comprehensive community public school district that serves students in pre-kindergarten through twelfth grade from Franklin Township, in Somerset County, in the U.S. state of New Jersey.

As of the 2023–24 school year, the district, comprised of 10 schools, had an enrollment of 7,352 students and 684.8 classroom teachers (on an FTE basis), for a student–teacher ratio of 10.7:1.

== History ==
In December 2014, a referendum was held in Franklin and was passed by voters (1,971 in favor and 1,477 against) to fix the overcrowding issues in all the district's schools (except for the High School) and for facility upgrades and additions so that they could eliminate the use of modular classrooms (trailers). It was projected that over 700 new students would come to the district as a result of new housing developments being built around the township. The grade level structure would be reconfigured so that students in the district would only have to move between schools twice instead of three times (in other words attending three schools instead of four), hence the name "One Less Move". All of Franklin's elementary schools had previously housed students in grades PreK–4, but after the reconfiguration they each now have 5th grade.

To fix the overcrowding issues at the district's six elementary schools, Claremont Elementary School, a seventh elementary school, was built and opened in time for the 2018–19 school year, and Elizabeth Avenue and Hillcrest Elementary Schools were expanded with new classroom wings. Also in terms of facility additions, an additional gym and a new main office were built at Franklin Middle School at Sampson G. Smith as part of the referendum.

In those schools and all the others (excluding the High School), upgrades were made to replace aging and old bathrooms, windows, doors, parking lot repaving, new playgrounds and outside playing fields, exterior lighting, and electrical systems, just to name a few.

Before the 2018-19 school year, Franklin Middle School at Sampson G. Smith was called Sampson G. Smith Intermediate School, for students in grades 5–6 and Franklin Middle School at Hamilton Street was called Franklin Middle School, for students in grades 7–8.

The district had been classified by the New Jersey Department of Education as being in District Factor Group "GH", the third-highest of eight groupings. District Factor Groups organize districts statewide to allow comparison by common socioeconomic characteristics of the local districts. From lowest socioeconomic status to highest, the categories are A, B, CD, DE, FG, GH, I and J.

== Awards and recognition ==
For the 1993-94 school year, Hillcrest Elementary School was named as a "Star School" by the New Jersey Department of Education, the highest honor that a New Jersey school can achieve. The school was honored again in the 1995-96 school year.

The NAMM Foundation named the district in its 2009 survey of the "Best Communities for Music Education", which included 124 school districts nationwide.

== Schools ==
Schools in the district (with 2023–24 enrollment data from the National Center for Education Statistics) are:

Elementary schools

- Claremont Elementary School (666 students; in grades PreK–5)
  - Miguel Rivera, principal
- Conerly Road School (333; PreK–5)
  - David Heras, principal
- Elizabeth Avenue School (561; PreK–5)
  - Greg Romero, principal
- Franklin Park School (635; PreK–5)
  - Evelyn Rutledge, interim principal
- Hillcrest School (452; PreK–5)
  - Lorri Vaccaro, principal
- MacAfee Road School (420; PreK–5)
  - Karen Adams, principal
- Pine Grove Manor School (379; PreK–5)
  - Edgar Vazquez Molina, principal

Middle schools

- Franklin Middle School at Hamilton Street Campus (667; 6–8)
  - Nubeja Allen, principal
- Franklin Middle School at Sampson G. Smith Campus (714; 6–8)
  - Rebekah Solomon, principal

High school

- Franklin High School (2,200; 9–12)
  - Genesi Miles, principal

== Administration ==
Core members of the district's administration are:

- Jamil Maroun, superintendent
- Brian Bonanno, business administrator and board secretary

Maroun replaced John Ravally who retired in June 2026. The district's Assistant Superintendent, Daniel Loughran, served as Interim Superintendent during the summer of 2026 until Maroun, previously the superintendent in nearby Manville, started in September 2026.

== Board of education ==
The district's board of education, composed of nine members, sets policy and oversees the fiscal and educational operation of the district through its administration. As a Type II school district, the board's trustees are elected directly by voters to serve three-year terms of office on a staggered basis, with three seats up for election each year held (since 2012) as part of the November general election. As of November 2025, elected members are Nicolas DiMeglio, Dennis Hopkins, Jr. Erika Inocencio, William "Bill" Grippo, Laurie Merris, Jimmie Parker, Meher Pervaaz-Rafiq, Jennifer Welch, Clara Wilson. The board appoints a superintendent to oversee the district's day-to-day operations and a business administrator to supervise the business functions of the district.
