= Manville School District =

School district in Somerset County, New Jersey, US

Address
- 1100 Brooks Boulevard Manville, Somerset County, New Jersey, 08835; United States
- Coordinates: 40.544851°N 74.591451°W

District information
- Grades: PreK-12
- Superintendent: Robert Mooney (interim)
- Business administrator: Devanshu L. Modi
- Schools: 4

Students and staff
- Enrollment: 1,761 (as of 2024–25)
- Faculty: 169.5 FTEs
- Student–teacher ratio: 10.4:1

Other information
- District Factor Group: CD
- Website: www.manvilleschools.org
Ind.	Per pupil	District spending	Rank (*)	K-12 average	%± vs. average
1A	Total Spending	$14,805	2	$18,891	−21.6%
1	Budgetary Cost	13,605	24	14,783	−8.0%
2	Classroom Instruction	7,465	13	8,763	−14.8%
6	Support Services	2,078	28	2,392	−13.1%
8	Administrative Cost	1,596	23	1,485	7.5%
10	Operations & Maintenance	2,022	41	1,783	13.4%
13	Extracurricular Activities	444	30	268	65.7%
16	Median Teacher Salary	52,257	5	64,043
Data from NJDoE 2014 Taxpayers' Guide to Education Spending. *Of K-12 districts with up to 1,800 students. Lowest spending=1; Highest=49

The Manville School District is a comprehensive community public school district that serves students in pre-kindergarten through twelfth grade from Manville in Somerset County, in the U.S. state of New Jersey.

As of the 2024–25 school year, the district, comprised of four schools, had an enrollment of 1,761 students and 169.5 classroom teachers (on an FTE basis), for a student–teacher ratio of 10.4:1.

== History ==
The district had been classified by the New Jersey Department of Education as being in District Factor Group "CD", the sixth-highest of eight groupings. District Factor Groups categorize districts statewide to allow comparison by common socioeconomic characteristics of the local districts. From lowest socioeconomic status to highest, the categories are A, B, CD, DE, FG, GH, I and J.

== Schools ==
Schools in the district (with 2024–25 enrollment data from the National Center for Education Statistics) are:

Elementary schools

- Weston Elementary School with 404 students in grades PreK–2
  - Alicia Rissmiller, principal
- Roosevelt Elementary School with 213 students in grades 3–4
  - Luke Weisenbach, Principal

Middle school

- Alexander Batcho Intermediate School with 510 students in grades 5–8
  - Mike Magliacano, principal

High school

- Manville High School with 528 students in grades 9-12
  - José Celis, principal

== Administration ==
Core members of the school's administration are:

- Robert Mooney, interim superintendent
- Devanshu L. Modi, business administrator and board secretary

The district's last permanent superintendent, Jamil Maroun, left at the end of August 2026 to become the superintendent in nearby Franklin.

== Board of education ==
The district's board of education is comprised of nine members who set policy and oversee the fiscal and educational operation of the district through its administration. As a Type II school district, the board's trustees are elected directly by voters to serve three-year terms of office on a staggered basis, with three seats up for election each year held (since 2012) as part of the November general election. The board appoints a superintendent to oversee the district's day-to-day operations and a business administrator to supervise the business functions of the district.
