= Franklin High School (New Jersey) =

High school in Somerset County, New Jersey, United States

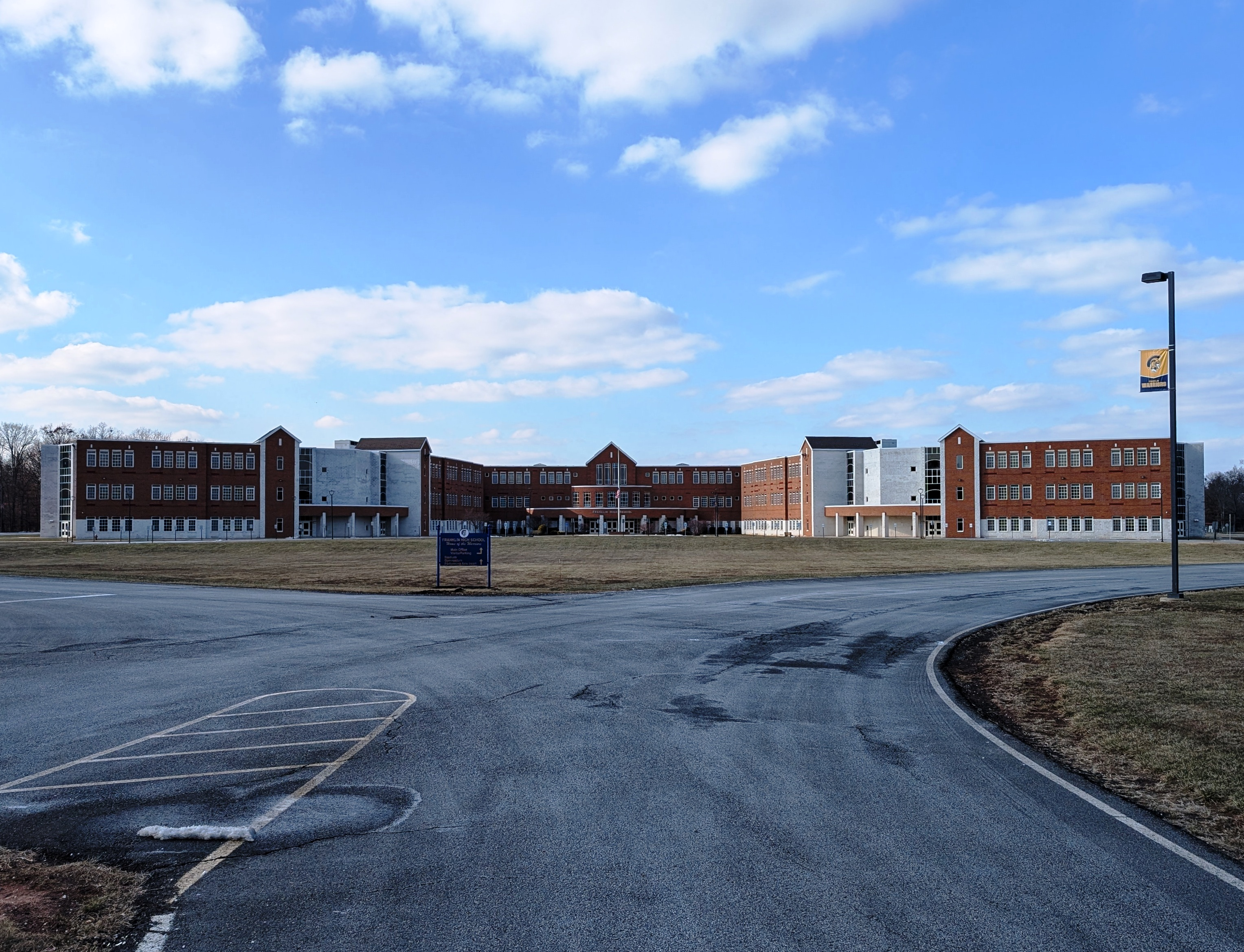

Location
- 500 Elizabeth Avenue; Somerset, Somerset County, New Jersey 08873; United States; 40.517217°N 74.546791°W

Information
- Type: Public high school
- Motto: Pride & Dignity
- Established: 1961; 65 years ago
- School district: Franklin Township Public Schools
- NCES School ID: 340549005194
- Principal: Genesi Miles
- Faculty: 180.0 FTEs
- Grades: 9-12
- Enrollment: 2,134 (as of 2024–25)
- Student to teacher ratio: 11.9:1
- Colors: Navy Blue and Gold
- Athletics conference: Skyland Conference (general); Big Central Football Conference (football)
- Team name: Warriors
- Newspaper: The Warrior
- Yearbook: Warrior
- Website: www.franklinboe.org/o/fahs

Franklin High School (FHS) is a comprehensive four-year public high school serving students in ninth through twelfth grades, located in the Somerset section of Franklin Township in Somerset County, in the U.S. state of New Jersey, operating as the lone secondary school of the Franklin Township Public Schools.

As of the 2024–25 school year, the school had an enrollment of 2,134 students and 180.0 classroom teachers (on an FTE basis), for a student–teacher ratio of 11.9:1. There were 905 students (42.4% of enrollment) eligible for free lunch and 166 (7.8% of students) eligible for reduced-cost lunch.

== Awards, recognition and rankings ==
The school was the 203rd-ranked public high school in New Jersey out of 339 schools statewide in New Jersey Monthly magazine's September 2014 cover story on the state's "Top Public High Schools", using a new ranking methodology. The school had been ranked 263rd in the state of 328 schools in 2012, after being ranked 201st in 2010 out of 322 schools listed. The magazine ranked the school 150th out of 316 schools in 2008.

== History ==
The original Franklin High School, now Franklin Middle School, was opened in 1961. Prior to that, the district sent its high school students to Princeton High School, Bound Brook High School, Highland Park High School, and New Brunswick High School among others. The original Franklin High School was designed to accommodate 1,600 students. By the mid 1990s, the student population had grown to over 2,000 making overcrowding a serious issue. In 2001, the residents of Franklin Township voted for the construction of a new High School. Construction began in 2002 and finished in September 2005. In that same month, the new Franklin High School opened its doors.

Among the persons who have served as Principal of Franklin High School are Orville Wilson, Dr. Howard Lucks, Dr. Neely Hackett, James Bevere, Thomas DiGanci (as interim principal from September 2014 to June 2016) and Cheryl A. Clark. DiGanci was the former principal of Watchung Hills Regional High School, where he was employed as principal for forty years before retiring in 2012. Ron Brundidge also served as an interim principal. Cheryl A. Clark previously served as the principal of Irvington's University Elementary School in Irvington, NJ. In 2018, Frank Chmiel, who previously served as the school's vice principal was selected to be the new principal, serving until April 2021, when he accepted the position to become the educational leader of Princeton High School. At the time of his departure, his administration team included four vice principals and the athletic director. Dr. Nicholas Solomon, the principal of Franklin Middle School, was selected at the Board of Education's June 16, 2021 meeting to succeed Chimel. In 2025, Genesi Miles became principal of Franklin High school, succeeding Dr. Nicholas Solomon.

== Academics ==
=== Courses ===
FHS offers a wide selection of courses to meet the needs of all students, including honors-level classes in core subjects, Fine and Performing Arts, and Technology. The school provides business and vocational programs that offer hands-on training and practical experience in real-world settings. Students can earn certifications through Cisco Systems, gain experience in television production and studio recording, and participate in internships and co-op programs with local businesses. Additionally, students have the option to attend Somerset County Vocational and Technical High School either part-time or full-time, where they can learn core subjects along with vocational skills such as auto mechanics and culinary arts.

The school offers open enrollment for Advanced Placement (AP) courses, allowing any student to register as long as they have completed the necessary prerequisites. It is not uncommon for sophomores to take AP United States History as part of their academic journey. In the 2024–25 school year, AP courses offered at FHS include:

- AP Art History
- AP Biology
- AP Chemistry
- AP Calculus AB/BC
- AP Comparative Government and Politics
- AP Computer Science A
- AP Computer Science Principles
- AP English Language and Composition
- AP English Literature and Composition
- AP Environmental Science
- AP French Language and Culture
- AP Macroeconomics
- AP Microeconomics
- AP Music Theory
- AP Physics 1
- AP Physics C: Mechanics
- AP Physics C: Electricity and Magnetism
- AP Psychology
- AP Spanish Language and Culture
- AP Spanish Literature and Culture
- AP Statistics
- AP United States Government and Politics
- AP United States History
- AP World History

Certain students who have completed the majority of courses in a department have a chance to take college courses in local colleges. In many cases, these courses will earn the student college credit that can be transferred to their college at the school's discretion. In the past, seniors have taken courses in Princeton University, Rutgers University, and Raritan Valley Community College.

=== Curriculum ===
Franklin High School students need to earn a total of 120 credits to be eligible for graduation. The vast majority of the year-long courses give 5 credits each while a half-year course offers 2.5 credits. The exceptions to this rule are the science classes with labs. An extra credit is given for each lab day in the 4-day cycle. AP sciences classes with a lab (AP Biology, AP Chemistry, AP Physics 1, & AP Physics C) give the students 6 credits. The credit spread for incoming classes is as follows:

Department	Minimum Credits
English	20 credits
Mathematics	15 credits, including content equivalent to Algebra I and Geometry
Science	15 credits, including content equivalent to Biology, and 2 additional laboratory/inquiry-based science courses
United States History	10 credits
World History	5 credits
World Languages	5 credits or pupil demonstration of proficiency
Physical Education and Health and Safety	5 credits for each year of public high school enrollment in New Jersey
Visual, Fine, and Performing Arts	5 credits
21st Century Life & Careers or Technical	5 credits
Financial, Economic & Business Literacy	2.5 credits
Elective Courses	17.5 credits
Total minimum credits	120

== Athletics ==
The Franklin High School Warriors compete in the Skyland Conference, which is comprised of public and private high schools in Hunterdon, Somerset and Warren counties in west Central Jersey and operates under the jurisdiction of the New Jersey State Interscholastic Athletic Association (NJSIAA). With 1,659 students in grades 10–12, the school was classified by the NJSIAA for the 2019–20 school year as Group IV for most athletic competition purposes, which included schools with an enrollment of 1,060 to 5,049 students in that grade range. The football team competes in Division 5B of the Big Central Football Conference, which includes 60 public and private high schools in Hunterdon, Middlesex, Somerset, Union and Warren counties, which are broken down into 10 divisions by size and location. The school was classified by the NJSIAA as Group V South for football for 2024–2026, which included schools with 1,333 to 2,324 students.

Sports offered by the Franklin High School Warriors athletic department include: baseball, basketball (boys and girls), bowling (boys and girls), cheerleading, cross country (boys and girls), field hockey, football, indoor track (boys and girls), soccer (boys and girls), softball, spring track (boys and girls), swimming (boys and girls), tennis (boys and girls) and wrestling.

The boys' bowling team won the overall state championship in 1975 and 1977.

The field hockey team won the North I Group I state sectional championship in 1977, 1980 and 1981.

The boys tennis team won the Group III state championship in 1982, defeating Millburn High School 3–2 in the final match of the tournament.

The football team won the Central Jersey Group III state sectional title in 1984, 1987, 1989, 1990, 1994 and 1996. The 1990 team won the Central Jersey Group III title with a 20–16 win against Ocean Township High School on a touchdown scored with under a minute left in the game. A 39–25 win against Neptune High School at Giants Stadium gave the 1994 team the Central Jersey Group III title. The team finished the 1996 season with a 10–1 record after defeating Hamilton High School West by a score of 26–3 at Giants Stadium in the Central Jersey Group III championship game.

The boys' track team won the Group III indoor relay championships in 1989, 1990 and 2006; the girls' track team won the relay title in Group III in 1991 and 1992, and in Group IV in 2015.

The boys indoor track team won the Group III state title in 1990 and the Group IV title in 2019. The girls won the indoor track title in Group III in 1992 and 2005.

The girls team won the NJSIAA spring / outdoor track state championship in Group III in 1993 and 2003.

The girls swimming team won the Public B state championship in 1996.

The boys spring / outdoor track team won the Group III championship in 1997 and the Group IV titles in 2017 and 2019.

The boys' basketball team won the Group III state title in 2003, defeating runner-up Cranford High School by a score of 66–59 in the finals.

The girls basketball team won the Group IV state championship in 2015 (defeating Shawnee High School in the tournament final), 2017 (vs. Sayreville High School), 2018 (vs. Toms River High School North) and 2019 (vs. Lenape High School); due to the cancellation of group finals due to COVID-19, the team was declared as North IV regional champion in 2020. The 2015 team won the program's first state title with a 54–58 win against Shawnee in the Group IV championship game. In 2017, the team won the Group IV title, defeating Sayreville High School by a score of 68–36 in the finals of the playoffs. The team went on to win the NJSIAA Tournament of Champions, defeating Manasquan High School in the tournament's final game. The 2019 team won the Group IV title with a 73–35 win against Lenape in the tournament final and moved on to the Tournament of Champions as the top seed, winning the semifinal round by a score of 55–50 against number-five seed St. Rose High School before taking the finals against number-two seed Saddle River Day School by a score of 65–57, setting the state record for wins in a season with a 34–0 mark for the year.

The boys' outdoor team won and set a new record time at the Penn Relays with a time of 41.98 seconds to win the boys 4x100 Large School title in 2016.

== Extracurricular activities ==
Most "clubs" meet after school when additional buses are available for after school transportation. Some clubs such as Brass Ensemble, Guitar Ensemble, and Model United Nations meet at night, in which cases the students are responsible for their own transportation. The Franklin High School Junior Classical league(JCL), recently hosted New Jersey JCL state convention at FHS. Recently, the Model United Nations club has won awards at several major conferences, including National High School Model UN conference (NHSMUN) 2021 and Rutgers Model Congress (RMC) 2022. They are also ranked in the top 10 in the country. Clubs offered at Franklin High School include:
_{Note: Some information may be inaccurate due to clubs forming or disbanding.}

== Administration ==
The school's principal is Genesi Miles. Members of the school administration include four vice principals, one assigned to each grade, along with the athletic director.

== Notable alumni ==
- Carlton Agudosi (born 1994, class of 2012), wide receiver who played in the NFL for the Arizona Cardinals
- Frank Baker (1944–2010), outfielder who played in MLB for the Cleveland Indians
- Krystyna Freda (born 1993), footballer who plays as a forward for Cypriot First Division club Apollon Ladies FC
- Michael Dayton Hermann (class of 1993), artist, arts professional, curator and author
- Roy Hinson (born 1961), basketball player who played in the NBA for the Cleveland Cavaliers, Philadelphia 76ers and New Jersey Nets
- Daryle Lamont Jenkins (born 1968), civil rights activist and founder of One People's Project
- Joshua Kuroda-Grauer (born 2003), professional baseball player for the Athletics of Major League Baseball
- Diamond Miller (born 2001, class of 2019), professional basketball player for the Minnesota Lynx of the Women's National Basketball Association
- Maleah Joi Moon (born 2003, class of 2020), Tony Award-winning actress best known for originating the role of Ali in the Alicia Keys semi-autographical Broadway musical, Hell's Kitchen
- Joe Pace (born 1953), former professional basketball player who played in the NBA for the Washington Bullets
- Jeff Porter (born 1985, class of 2003), track and field athlete who competes in the 110-meter hurdles
- Joe Porter (born 1985), cornerback who played in the NFL for the Green Bay Packers, Cleveland Browns and Oakland Raiders
- Jim Stoops (born 1972), former professional baseball pitcher who played for one season in MLB for the Colorado Rockies
