= Michael Dayton Hermann =

American artist and arts executive

Michael Dayton Hermann (2024). Photo by Daniil Lavrovski.

Michael Dayton Hermann is an American artist, arts professional, curator, and author based in New York City. He is known for his multidisciplinary practice and his work with The Andy Warhol Foundation for the Visual Arts, where he serves as Managing Director, Strategic Initiatives.

== Education ==
Hermann was raised in the Somerset section of Franklin Township, Somerset County, New Jersey and graduated in 1993 from Franklin High School. He earned a Bachelor of Fine Arts from Parsons School of Design, graduating with academic and departmental honors, and a Masters of Fine Arts degree at Hunter College, where he studied with Robert Morris and completed his thesis under the advisement of Nari Ward.

== Artistic Work ==
Hermann's artistic practice includes painting, video, sculpture, and mixed media. His work explores the human condition using themes of media saturation and the reinterpretation of cultural symbols. In 2024, he presented REconstituted, an exhibition that explored the tension between authenticity and fabrication in contemporary culture. His 40-minute video work Mixtape (2018/2023) examines collective media experiences and sensory nostalgia through fragmented visual narratives. In 2016, he created Flowers, a reimagining of the traditional still-life genre that sought to highlight historical subject matter using contemporary references. In 2017, Stations addressed the contemporary relevance of religious themes. His work has been exhibited internationally.

== Author ==
Hermann is the author of two books published by TASCHEN. Warhol on Basquiat (2020) documents the relationship between Andy Warhol and Jean-Michel Basquiat, including over 400 previously unpublished photographs and archival materials. Andy Warhol: Love, Sex, and Desire (2021) features a collection of Warhol's early drawings centered on intimacy and identity. These publications have been featured in outlets including The Guardian, Vanity Fair, and Vogue.

== The Andy Warhol Foundation ==
Hermann has worked at The Andy Warhol Foundation for over twenty years. His initiatives include the 2021 Machine Made NFT auction in collaboration with Christie’s, which raise over $3.3 million for the Foundation. He also launched Philanthropy Factory in 2024, a project that enabled nonprofit arts organizations to receive proceeds from the sale of Warhol’s work. Hermann has developed and curated exhibitions and fundraising initiatives including Social Disease at Dover Street Market and Better Days and Social Network at Christie’s. An ongoing partnership with eBay for Charity has generated over $3 million in support of the Foundation's grant-making programs. Hermann contributed to the development of the Netflix docuseries The Andy Warhol Diaries and has overseen collaborations with brands such as Comme des Garçons, Dior, Tiffany & Co., Absolut, Bulgari, Burger King, and Coca-Cola.

== Leadership in Contemporary Art ==
Hermann serves on the board of the Children's Museum of the Arts (CMOA) and Baxter Street at CCNY. His commentary has appeared in Gagosian Quarterly, Creating Home, and DACS, and has been featured in interviews, profiles, and commentary across platforms such as CBS, NPR “All Things Considered,” Interview Magazine, The Guardian, Vanity Fair, Harpers Bazaar, The Art Newspaper, ArtNews, Hypebeast, Architectural Digest. He regularly participates in public programs and panel discussions related to art and culture.
