= Manville High School =

High school in Somerset County, New Jersey, US

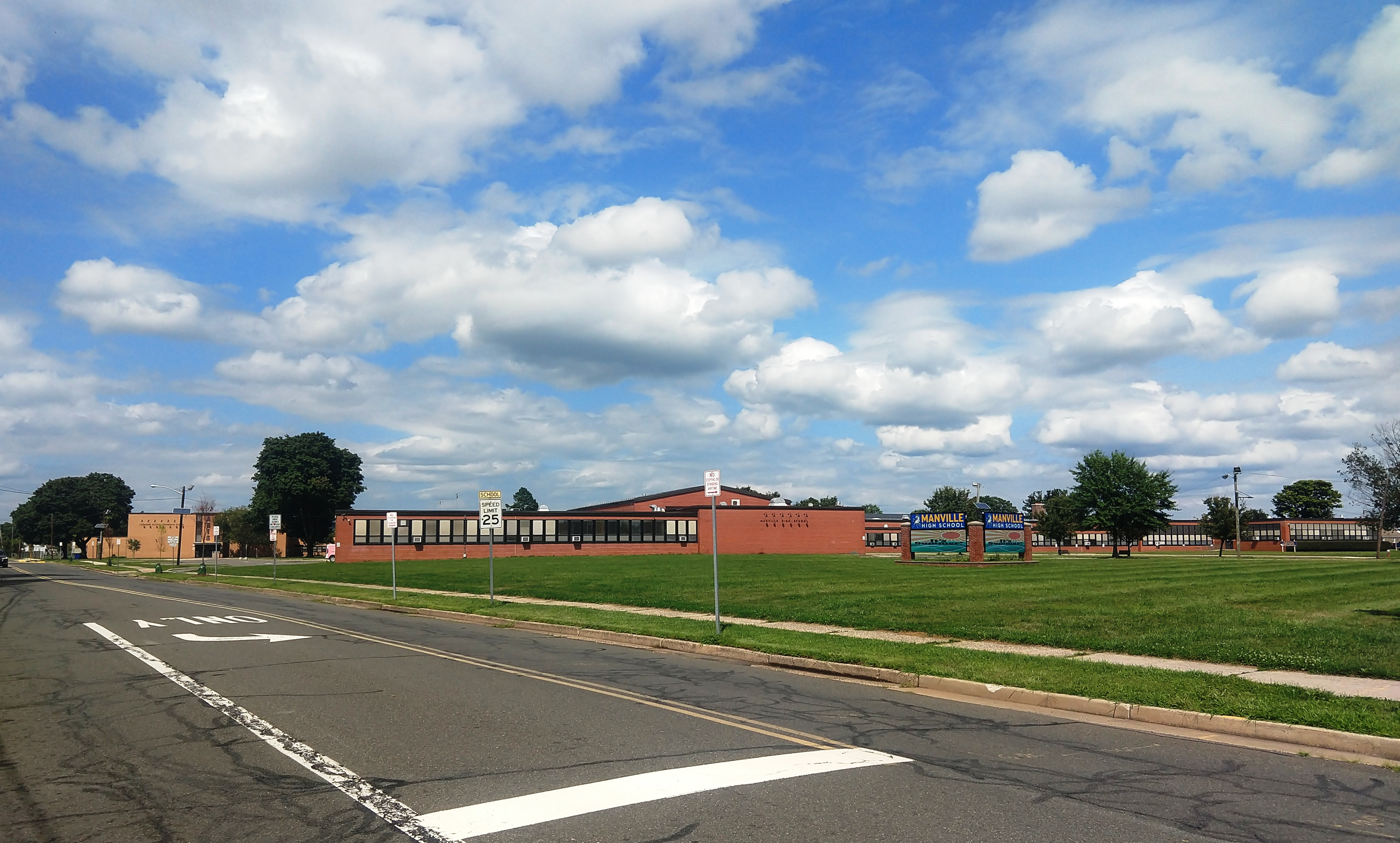

Location
- 1100 Brooks Boulevard; Manville, Somerset County, New Jersey 08835; United States; 40.543718°N 74.597308°W

Information
- Type: Public high school
- School district: Manville School District
- NCES School ID: 340963005238
- Principal: José Celis
- Faculty: 51.6 FTEs
- Grades: 9–12
- Enrollment: 528 (as of 2024–25)
- Student to teacher ratio: 10.2:1
- Colors: Royal blue and gold
- Athletics conference: Skyland Conference (general); Big Central Football Conference (football)
- Team name: Mustangs
- Publication: Hoofprints
- Website: mhs.manvilleschools.org

Manville High School is a four-year comprehensive community public high school that serves students in ninth through twelfth grades from Manville in Somerset County, in the U.S. state of New Jersey, operating as the lone secondary school of the Manville School District.

As of the 2024–25 school year, the school had an enrollment of 528 students and 51.6 classroom teachers (on an FTE basis), for a student–teacher ratio of 10.2:1. There were 261 students (49.4% of enrollment) eligible for free lunch and 78 (14.8% of students) eligible for reduced-cost lunch.

== Awards, recognition, and rankings ==
The school was the 277th-ranked public high school in New Jersey out of 339 schools statewide in New Jersey Monthly magazine's September 2014 cover story on the state's "Top Public High Schools," using a new ranking methodology. The school had been ranked 201st in the state of 328 schools in 2012, after being ranked 196th in 2010 out of 322 schools listed. The magazine ranked the school 144th in the magazine's September 2008 issue, which surveyed 316 schools across the state.

In the 2023–24 edition of U.S. News & World Report Best High Schools, Manville High School was ranked in the top 40% of public high schools nationwide and placed 160th among the high schools in New Jersey.

== Athletics ==
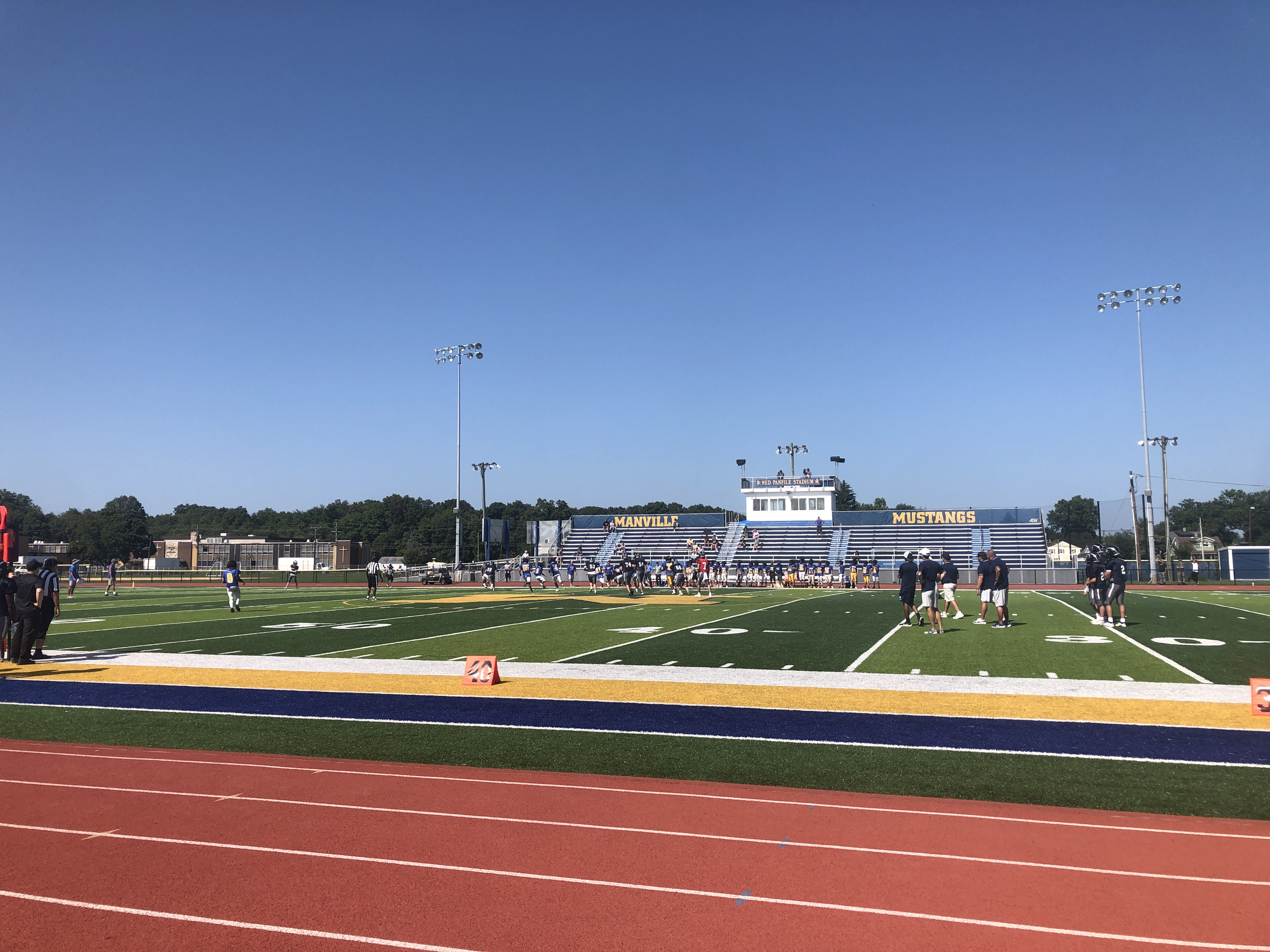
Manville's Ned Panfile Stadium during a preseason Football game against Pingry. The Stadium is named after Alumni, longtime athletic director, football coach, and director of the Manville Board of Education, Ned Panfile.

The Manville High School Mustangs compete in the Skyland Conference, which is comprised of public and private high schools spanning Hunterdon, Somerset and Warren counties in northern New Jersey, operating under the jurisdiction of the New Jersey State Interscholastic Athletic Association (NJSIAA). With 312 students in grades 10-12, the school was classified by the NJSIAA for the 2019–20 school year as Group I for most athletic competition purposes, which included schools with an enrollment of 75 to 476 students in that grade range. The football team competes in Division 1B of the Big Central Football Conference, which includes 60 public and private high schools in Hunterdon, Middlesex, Somerset, Union and Warren counties, which are broken down into 10 divisions by size and location. The school was classified by the NJSIAA as Group I South for football for 2024–2026, which included schools with 185 to 482 students.

The baseball team won the Central Jersey Group I state sectional championship in 1967, 1968 and 1970.

The boys' wrestling team won the Central Jersey Group I sectional championship in 1982 and 1992-1994.

== Administration ==
The school's principal is José Celis. Core members of the school's administration include a vice principal.

== Notable alumni ==
- Cheryl Chase (born 1958, class of 1977), actress and children's book authors best known for voicing Angelica Pickles in the television series Rugrats and its spinoffs.
- Gerald E. Loeb (born 1948, class of 1977), neurophysiologist, biomedical engineer, academic and author
- Robert Sikoryak (born 1964, class of 1983), artist who specializes in making comic adaptations of literature classics.
