= Gerald E. Loeb =

American biomedical engineer

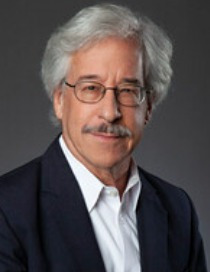
- Gerald E. Loeb portrait
- Born: 1948 (age 77–78); New Brunswick, New Jersey, U.S.
- Occupations: Researcher, biomedical engineer and academic

Academic background
- Education: Johns Hopkins University (BA, MD)
- Website: Official website

Gerald E. Loeb (born 1948) is an American biomedical engineer, neurophysiologist, and academic. He is a professor of biomedical engineering, neurology, and pharmacy at the University of Southern California (USC).

Loeb's research focuses on neural prosthetics and sensorimotor control. He contributed to early research on the cochlear implant, including design recommendations for low-cost systems, and developed technologies such as BION injectable neuromuscular stimulators and the BioTac biomimetic tactile sensor. He has authored over 400 peer-reviewed articles and a book on electromyography.

Loeb is a Fellow of the American Institute for Medical and Biological Engineering and the National Academy of Inventors.

== Early life and education ==
Loeb was born in 1948 in New Brunswick, New Jersey. He graduated from Manville High School as the valedictorian of the class of 1977.

He received a Bachelor of Arts in Human Biology in 1969 and a Doctor of Medicine in 1972 from Johns Hopkins University. He completed a surgical internship at the University of Arizona from 1972 to 1973.

== Career ==
Loeb served at the National Institutes of Health (NIH) in the Laboratory of Neural Control from 1973 to 1988, advancing from research associate to chief of the Neurokinesiology Section.

From 1988 to 1999, he was professor of physiology and director of the Bio-Medical Engineering Unit at Queen's University in Kingston, Ontario. From 1994 to 1999, he served as chief scientist (consulting) for Advanced Bionics Corporation.

In 1999, Loeb joined USC as professor of biomedical engineering and director of the Medical Device Development Facility. He has held secondary appointments in neurology since 2006 and pharmacy since 2008.

Loeb was the founding CEO of SynTouch Inc. in 2008 and has served on its board of directors since then.

== Research ==
Loeb's research focuses on neural prosthetics, involving interfaces between electronic devices and the nervous system to restore sensory and motor functions. In the 1990s, he participated in expert panels and contributed to designs for affordable multichannel cochlear implant systems.

His group developed BIONs (BIOnic Neurons), miniature injectable, wirelessly powered stimulators for neuromuscular applications, including treatment of paralysis complications, with studies on recruitment, comfort, and clinical feasibility. They also created the BioTac, a biomimetic tactile sensor commercialized by SynTouch Inc. for robotic and prosthetic applications.

Loeb conducts neurophysiological studies of the sensorimotor nervous system and develops computer models to test control theories for functional electrical stimulation (FES) in paralyzed limbs and powered prosthetics.

== Awards and honors ==
- Fellow, American Institute for Medical and Biological Engineering (2001)
- Medical Device & Diagnostic Industry Magazine 100 Notable People in the Medical Device Industry (2008)
- Popular Mechanics Breakthrough Innovator Award (2013, for the BioTac sensor developed with SynTouch)
- SynTouch was named a World Economic Forum Technology Pioneer in 2014
- Fellow, National Academy of Inventors

== Selected works ==
=== Books ===
- Loeb, Gerald E.; Gans, Carl (1986). Electromyography for Experimentalists. University of Chicago Press. ISBN 978-0-226-49015-1.

=== Journal articles ===
- Loeb, Gerald E.; Peck, R.A.; Hood, K. (2001). "BION™ system for distributed neural prosthetic interfaces". Medical Engineering & Physics. 23 (1): 9–18. doi:10.1016/S1350-4533(01)00011-X.
- Fishel, Jeremy A.; Loeb, Gerald E. (2012). "Bayesian Exploration for Intelligent Identification of Textures". Frontiers in Neurorobotics. 6. doi:10.3389/fnbot.2012.00004. PMC 3389458.
- Wettels, Nicholas; Santos, Veronica J.; Johansson, Roland S.; Loeb, Gerald E. (2008). "Biomimetic Tactile Sensor Array". Advanced Robotics. 22 (8): 829–849. doi:10.1163/156855308X314533.
- Bak, M.; Girvin, J. P.; Hambrecht, F. T.; Kufta, C. V.; Loeb, G. E.; Schmidt, E. M. (1990). "Visual sensations produced by intracortical microstimulation of the human occipital cortex". Medical & Biological Engineering & Computing. 28 (3): 257–259. doi:10.1007/BF02442682.

=== Patents ===
Loeb holds numerous U.S. patents related to neural prosthetics and medical devices, including inventions in biomimetic tactile sensors and implantable stimulators.
