= Manville, New Jersey =

Borough in Somerset County, New Jersey, US

- Borough
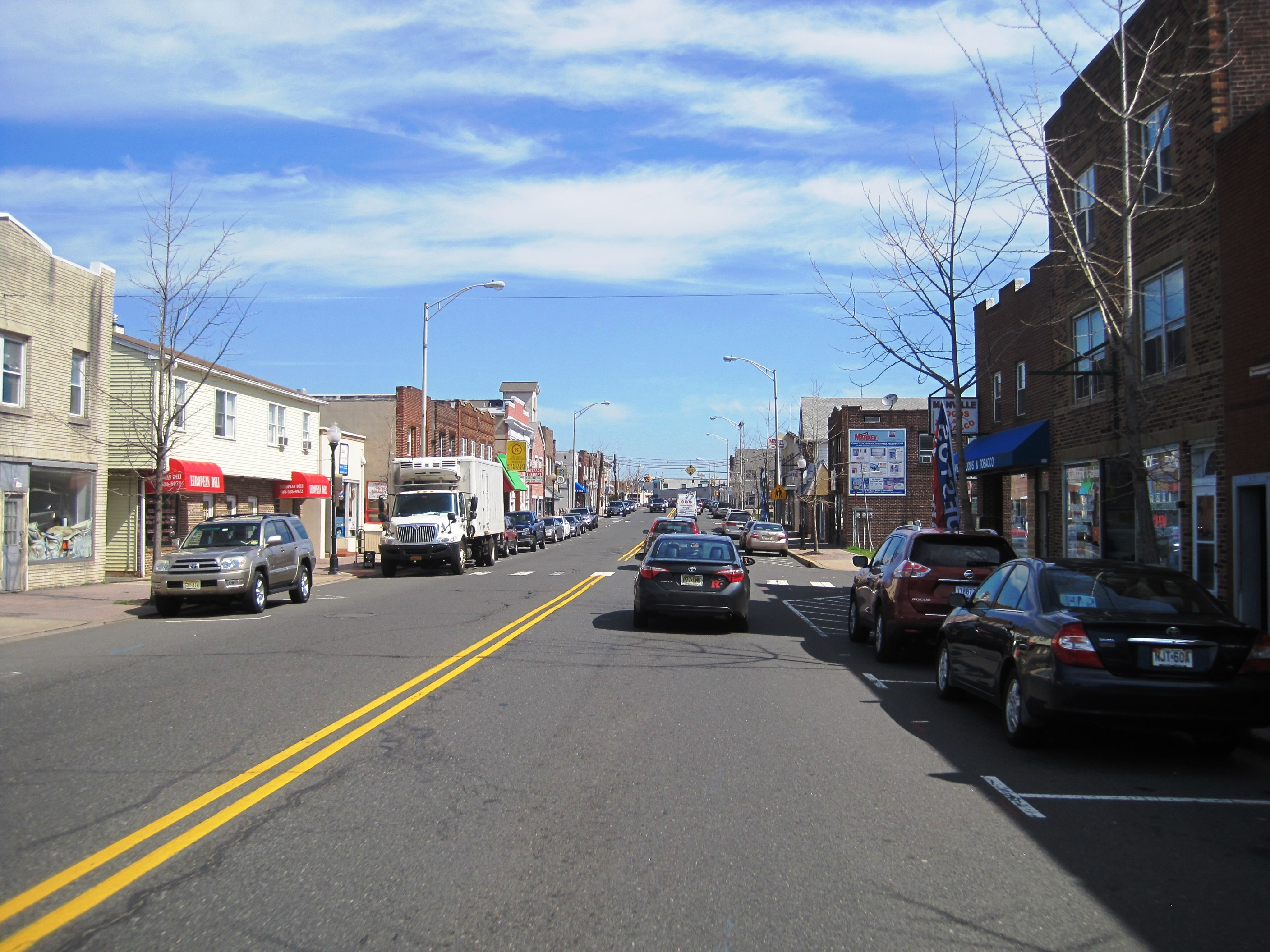
- Central business district of Manville

- Seal

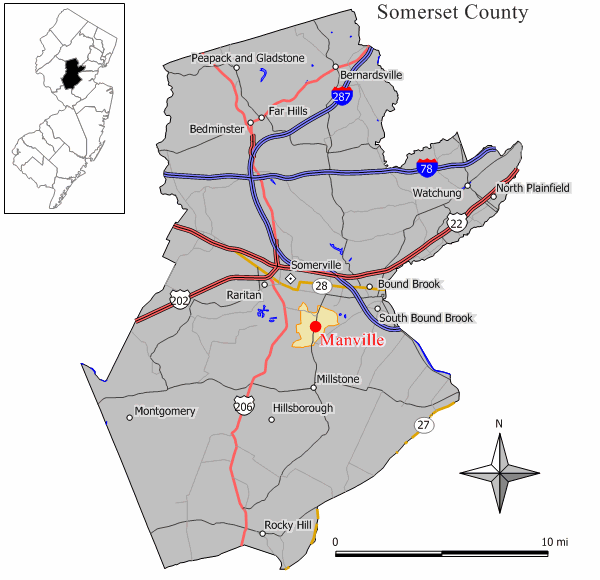
- Location of Manville in Somerset County highlighted in yellow (right). Inset map: Location of Somerset County in New Jersey highlighted in black (left).

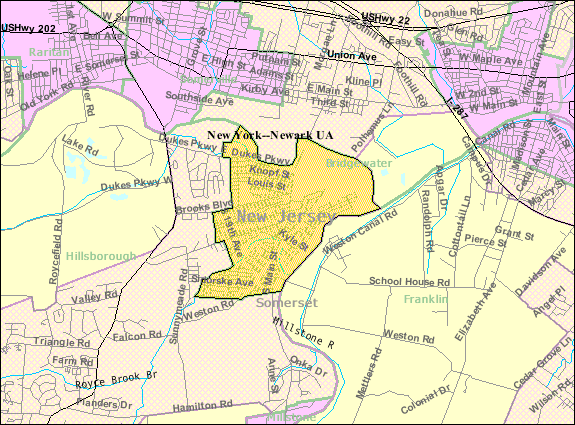
- Census Bureau map of Manville, New Jersey

- Location in Somerset County Location in New Jersey Location in the United States
- Coordinates: 40.541269°N 74.589273°W
- Country: United States
- State: New Jersey
- County: Somerset
- Incorporated: April 18, 1929
- Named for: Johns-Manville Corporation

Government
  - Type: Borough
  - Body: Borough Council
  - Mayor: Richard Onderko (I, term ends December 31, 2027)
  - Administrator: Gian-Paolo Caminiti
  - Municipal clerk: Gian-Paolo Caminiti (acting)

Area
  - Total: 2.45 sq mi (6.34 km^{2})
  - Land: 2.36 sq mi (6.11 km^{2})
  - Water: 0.089 sq mi (0.23 km^{2}) 3.59%
  - Rank: 377th of 565 in state 15th of 21 in county
- Elevation: 56 ft (17 m)

Population (2020)
  - Total: 10,953
  - Estimate (2025): 10,932
  - Rank: 230th of 565 in state 11th of 21 in county
  - Density: 4,639.1/sq mi (1,791.2/km^{2})
  - Rank: 124th of 565 in state 5th of 21 in county
- Time zone: UTC−05:00 (Eastern (EST))
  - Summer (DST): UTC−04:00 (Eastern (EDT))
- ZIP Code: 08835
- Area code: 908
- FIPS code: 3403543620
- GNIS feature ID: 0885291
- Website: www.manvillenj.org

Manville is a borough in Somerset County, in the central portion of the U.S. state of New Jersey. The borough is located in the heart of the Raritan Valley region and is a part of the New York metropolitan area. As of the 2020 United States census, the borough's population was 10,953, an increase of 609 (+5.9%) from the 2010 census count of 10,344, which in turn had reflected an increase of one person from the 10,343 residents counted at the 2000 census. Manville was named after the Johns-Manville Corporation, which maintained a large manufacturing facility in the borough for decades.

Historically, many of Manville's residents are of Slavic—mostly eastern Polish (23.1% of the borough's population in 2000) and western Ukrainian descent—with many businesses and restaurants geared towards the Polish American community located along Main Street (County Route 533).

Manville was formed by an act of the New Jersey Legislature on April 1, 1929, subject to the results of a referendum held on April 18, 1929.

== Geography ==
According to the United States Census Bureau, the borough had a total area of 2.45 square miles (6.34 km^{2}), including 2.36 square miles (6.11 km^{2}) of land and 0.09 square miles (0.23 km^{2}) of water (3.59%).

Unincorporated communities, localities and place names located partially or completely within the borough include Millsboro.

The borough borders Bridgewater Township, Franklin Township, and Hillsborough Township.

=== Ecology ===
According to the A. W. Kuchler U.S. potential natural vegetation types, Manville would have an Appalachian Oak (104) vegetation type with an Eastern Hardwood Forest (25) vegetation form.

== Demographics ==
Historical population
Census	Pop.	Note	%±
1930	5,441		—
1940	6,065		11.5%
1950	8,597		41.7%
1960	10,995		27.9%
1970	13,029		18.5%
1980	11,278		−13.4%
1990	10,567		−6.3%
2000	10,343		−2.1%
2010	10,344		0.0%
2020	10,953		5.9%
2023 (est.)	10,779	▼	−1.6%
Population sources: 1930; 1940–2000 2000; 2010 2020

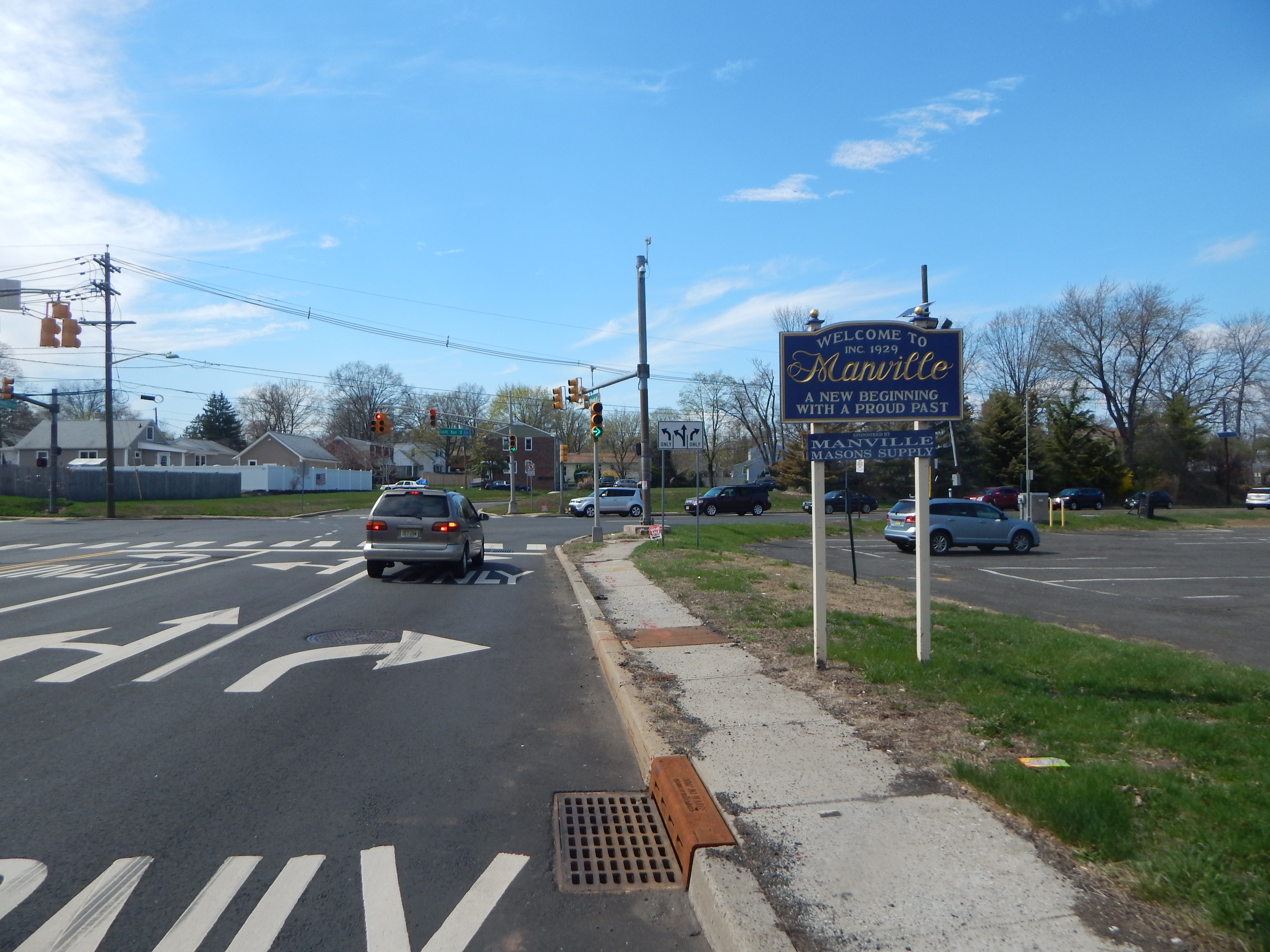
Entering Manville

=== 2020 census ===
As of the 2020 census, Manville had a population of 10,953. The median age was 39.3 years. 20.5% of residents were under the age of 18 and 14.3% of residents were 65 years of age or older. For every 100 females there were 100.5 males, and for every 100 females age 18 and over there were 99.3 males age 18 and over.

100.0% of residents lived in urban areas, while 0.0% lived in rural areas.

There were 4,092 households in Manville, of which 31.0% had children under the age of 18 living in them. Of all households, 45.0% were married-couple households, 20.9% were households with a male householder and no spouse or partner present, and 26.3% were households with a female householder and no spouse or partner present. About 26.5% of all households were made up of individuals and 10.4% had someone living alone who was 65 years of age or older.

There were 4,290 housing units, of which 4.6% were vacant. The homeowner vacancy rate was 1.3% and the rental vacancy rate was 5.2%.

Racial composition as of the 2020 census
Race	Number	Percent
White	6,778	61.9%
Black or African American	557	5.1%
American Indian and Alaska Native	53	0.5%
Asian	342	3.1%
Native Hawaiian and Other Pacific Islander	17	0.2%
Some other race	1,656	15.1%
Two or more races	1,550	14.2%
Hispanic or Latino (of any race)	3,464	31.6%

=== 2010 census ===
The 2010 United States census counted 10,344 people, 4,016 households, and 2,663 families in the borough. The population density was 4,382.0 per square mile (1,691.9/km^{2}). There were 4,277 housing units at an average density of 1,811.9 per square mile (699.6/km^{2}). The racial makeup was 86.35% (8,932) White, 2.72% (281) Black or African American, 0.10% (10) Native American, 1.99% (206) Asian, 0.00% (0) Pacific Islander, 6.50% (672) from other races, and 2.35% (243) from two or more races. Hispanic or Latino of any race were 18.98% (1,963) of the population.

Of the 4,016 households, 26.8% had children under the age of 18; 47.2% were married couples living together; 12.6% had a female householder with no husband present and 33.7% were non-families. Of all households, 27.0% were made up of individuals and 11.0% had someone living alone who was 65 years of age or older. The average household size was 2.58 and the average family size was 3.12.

20.2% of the population were under the age of 18, 9.0% from 18 to 24, 28.6% from 25 to 44, 28.0% from 45 to 64, and 14.2% who were 65 years of age or older. The median age was 39.6 years. For every 100 females, the population had 100.5 males. For every 100 females ages 18 and older there were 99.3 males.

The Census Bureau's 2006–2010 American Community Survey showed that (in 2010 inflation-adjusted dollars) median household income was $55,601 (with a margin of error of +/− $4,325) and the median family income was $63,864 (+/− $11,426). Males had a median income of $48,356 (+/− $4,062) versus $40,954 (+/− $5,868) for females. The per capita income for the borough was $26,636 (+/− $1,894). About 1.9% of families and 4.6% of the population were below the poverty line, including 8.4% of those under age 18 and 3.2% of those age 65 or over.

=== 2000 census ===
As of the 2000 United States census there were 10,343 people, 4,115 households, and 2,757 families residing in the borough. The population density was 4,167.5 inhabitants per square mile (1,609.1/km^{2}). There were 4,296 housing units at an average density of 1,731.0 per square mile (668.3/km^{2}). The racial makeup of the borough was 95.99% White, 0.45% African American, 0.07% Native American, 1.31% Asian, 0.03% Pacific Islander, 1.14% from other races, and 1.01% from two or more races. Hispanic or Latino of any race were 5.40% of the population.

23.1% of Manville's residents identified themselves as being of Polish ancestry, the second highest in New Jersey (behind Wallington's 45.5%), for all places with 1,000 people listing their ancestry.

There were 4,115 households, out of which 26.5% had children under the age of 18 living with them, 50.3% were married couples living together, 11.9% had a female householder with no husband present, and 33.0% were non-families. 26.7% of all households were made up of individuals, and 12.3% had someone living alone who was 65 years of age or older. The average household size was 2.51 and the average family size was 3.05.

In the borough the population was spread out, with 20.7% under the age of 18, 7.2% from 18 to 24, 31.9% from 25 to 44, 22.5% from 45 to 64, and 17.7% who were 65 years of age or older. The median age was 40 years. For every 100 females, there were 96.2 males. For every 100 females aged 18 and over, there were 94.0 males.

The median income for a household in the borough was $51,258, and the median income for a family was $61,151. Males had a median income of $40,902 versus $32,030 for females. The per capita income for the borough was $23,293. About 2.1% of families and 3.8% of the population were below the poverty line, including 3.8% of those under age 18 and 4.8% of those age 65 or over.

== Government ==
=== Local government ===
Manville is governed under the borough form of New Jersey municipal government, which is used in 218 municipalities (of the 564) statewide, making it the most common form of government in New Jersey. The governing body is comprised of a mayor and a borough council, with all positions elected at-large on a partisan basis as part of the November general election. A mayor is elected directly by the voters to a four-year term of office. The borough council includes six members elected to serve three-year terms on a staggered basis, with two seats coming up for election each year in a three-year cycle.

The borough form of government used by Manville is a "weak mayor / strong council" government in which council members act as the legislative body with the mayor presiding at meetings and voting only in the event of a tie. The mayor can veto ordinances subject to an override by a two-thirds majority vote of the council. The mayor makes committee and liaison assignments for council members, and most appointments are made by the mayor with the advice and consent of the council.

As of 2024, the mayor of Manville is Independent Richard M. Onderko, whose term of office ends December 31, 2027. Mayor Onderko earned a third term on November 7, 2023, holding off two challengers, making him the first mayoral incumbent elected without a party endorsement. Members of the Manville Borough Council are Council President Ron Skirkanish (R, 2025), Branden Agans (R, 2024), Dayna A. Camacho (I, 2026), Joe DiVeto III (R, 2025), Barbara Madak (R, 2024), Jade Nicolle Puia (I, 2026).

Preceding Mayor Onderko was Mayor Angelo Corradino, the only five-term mayor in Manville's history, the first Manville Mayor to be elected as the president of the New Jersey Conference of Mayors and the first mayor of Manville to be elected into the New Jersey Mayors Hall of Fame.

=== Federal, state and county representation ===
Manville is located in the 12th Congressional District and is part of New Jersey's 23rd state legislative district.

For the 119th United States Congress, New Jersey's 12th congressional district is represented by Bonnie Watson Coleman (D, Ewing Township). New Jersey is represented in the United States Senate by Democrats Cory Booker (Newark, term ends 2027) and Andy Kim (Moorestown, term ends 2031).

For the 2026–2027 session, the 23rd legislative district of the New Jersey Legislature is represented in the State Senate by Doug Steinhardt (R, Lopatcong Township) and in the General Assembly by John DiMaio (R, Hackettstown) and Erik Peterson (R, Franklin Township).

Somerset County is governed by a five-member Board of County Commissioners, whose members are elected at-large to three-year terms of office on a staggered basis, with one or two seats coming up for election each year. At an annual reorganization meeting held in the first week of January, the board selects a Director and deputy director from among its members. As of 2025, Somerset County's County Commissioners are Director Shanel Robinson (D, Franklin Township, term as commissioner ends 2027; term as director ends 2026), Deputy Director Paul Drake (D, Hillsborough Township, term as commissioner and as deputy director ends 2026), Melonie Marano (D, Green Brook Township, 2028), Elizabeth Graner (D, Bernards Township, 2026; elected to serve an unexpired term) and Sara Sooy (D, Bedminster Township, 2027).

Constitutional officers, elected on a countywide basis are Clerk Steve Peter (D, Somerville, 2027), Sheriff Darrin Russo (D, Franklin Township, 2028) and Surrogate Bernice "Tina" Jalloh (D, Franklin Township, 2030).

=== Politics ===
As of March 2011, there were a total of 5,200 registered voters in Manville, of which 1,375 (26.4% vs. 26.0% countywide) were registered as Democrats, 1,080 (20.8% vs. 25.7%) were registered as Republicans and 2,741 (52.7% vs. 48.2%) were registered as Unaffiliated. There were 4 voters registered as Libertarians or Greens. Among the borough's 2010 Census population, 50.3% (vs. 60.4% in Somerset County) were registered to vote, including 63.0% of those ages 18 and over (vs. 80.4% countywide).

United States presidential election results for Manville
Year	Republican		Democratic		Third party(ies)	
Year	No.	%	No.	%	No.	%
2024	2,511	58.07%	1,731	40.03%	82	1.90%
2020	2,434	53.81%	2,011	44.46%	78	1.72%
2016	2,111	56.84%	1,447	38.96%	156	4.20%
2012	1,641	48.24%	1,702	50.03%	59	1.73%
2008	1,928	51.47%	1,746	46.61%	72	1.92%
2004	1,998	52.69%	1,741	45.91%	53	1.40%
2000	1,489	42.94%	1,847	53.26%	132	3.81%

In the 2012 presidential election, Democrat Barack Obama received 50.0% of the vote (1,702 cast), ahead of Republican Mitt Romney with 48.2% (1,641 votes), and other candidates with 1.7% (59 votes), among the 3,449 ballots cast by the borough's 5,449 registered voters (47 ballots were spoiled), for a turnout of 63.3%. In the 2008 presidential election, Republican John McCain received 1,928 votes (50.7% vs. 46.1% countywide), ahead of Democrat Barack Obama with 1,746 votes (45.9% vs. 52.1%) and other candidates with 72 votes (1.9% vs. 1.1%), among the 3,802 ballots cast by the borough's 5,129 registered voters, for a turnout of 74.1% (vs. 78.7% in Somerset County). In the 2004 presidential election, Republican George W. Bush received 1,998 votes (52.4% vs. 51.5% countywide), ahead of Democrat John Kerry with 1,741 votes (45.7% vs. 47.2%) and other candidates with 53 votes (1.4% vs. 0.9%), among the 3,812 ballots cast by the borough's 4,881 registered voters, for a turnout of 78.1% (vs. 81.7% in the whole county).

Gubernatorial election results for Manville
Year	Republican		Democratic		Third party(ies)	
Year	No.	%	No.	%	No.	%
2025	1,562	49.49%	1,564	49.56%	30	0.95%
2021	1,658	63.84%	919	35.39%	20	0.77%
2017	1,318	63.40%	691	33.24%	70	3.37%
2013	1,745	74.00%	570	24.17%	43	1.82%
2009	1,594	59.86%	823	30.90%	246	9.24%
2005	1,229	47.62%	1,184	45.87%	168	6.51%

In the 2013 gubernatorial election, Republican Chris Christie received 74.0% of the vote (1,745 cast), ahead of Democrat Barbara Buono with 24.2% (570 votes), and other candidates with 1.8% (43 votes), among the 2,402 ballots cast by the borough's 5,535 registered voters (44 ballots were spoiled), for a turnout of 43.4%. In the 2009 gubernatorial election, Republican Chris Christie received 1,594 votes (58.9% vs. 55.8% countywide), ahead of Democrat Jon Corzine with 823 votes (30.4% vs. 34.1%), Independent Chris Daggett with 210 votes (7.8% vs. 8.7%) and other candidates with 36 votes (1.3% vs. 0.7%), among the 2,704 ballots cast by the borough's 5,189 registered voters, yielding a 52.1% turnout (vs. 52.5% in the county).

United States Senate election results for Manville1
Year	Republican		Democratic		Third party(ies)	
Year	No.	%	No.	%	No.	%
2024	2,224	54.87%	1,721	42.46%	108	2.66%
2018	1,601	56.20%	1,128	39.59%	120	4.21%
2012	1,499	46.61%	1,621	50.40%	96	2.99%
2006	1,165	49.07%	1,029	43.34%	180	7.58%

United States Senate election results for Manville2
Year	Republican		Democratic		Third party(ies)	
Year	No.	%	No.	%	No.	%
2020	2,279	51.62%	1,990	45.07%	146	3.31%
2014	1,054	55.33%	788	41.36%	63	3.31%
2013	711	61.03%	432	37.08%	22	1.89%
2008	1,700	48.59%	1,602	45.78%	197	5.63%

== Education ==
The Manville School District serves public school students in pre-kindergarten through twelfth grade. As of the 2019–20 school year, the district, comprised of four schools, had an enrollment of 1,601 students and 132.5 classroom teachers (on an FTE basis), for a student–teacher ratio of 12.1:1. Schools in the district (with 2019–20 enrollment data from the National Center for Education Statistics) are Weston Elementary School with 349 students in grades Pre-K–2, Roosevelt Elementary School with 234 students in grades 3–4, Alexander Batcho Intermediate School with 485 students in grades 5–8 and Manville High School with 450 students in grades 9–12.

Christ the King School, which opened in 1968 and served students in grades Pre-K–8, was closed by the Roman Catholic Diocese of Metuchen at the end of the 2014–2015 school year in the wake of declining enrollment that had resulted in a $1 million deficit to the parish in the preceding five years.

== Transportation ==
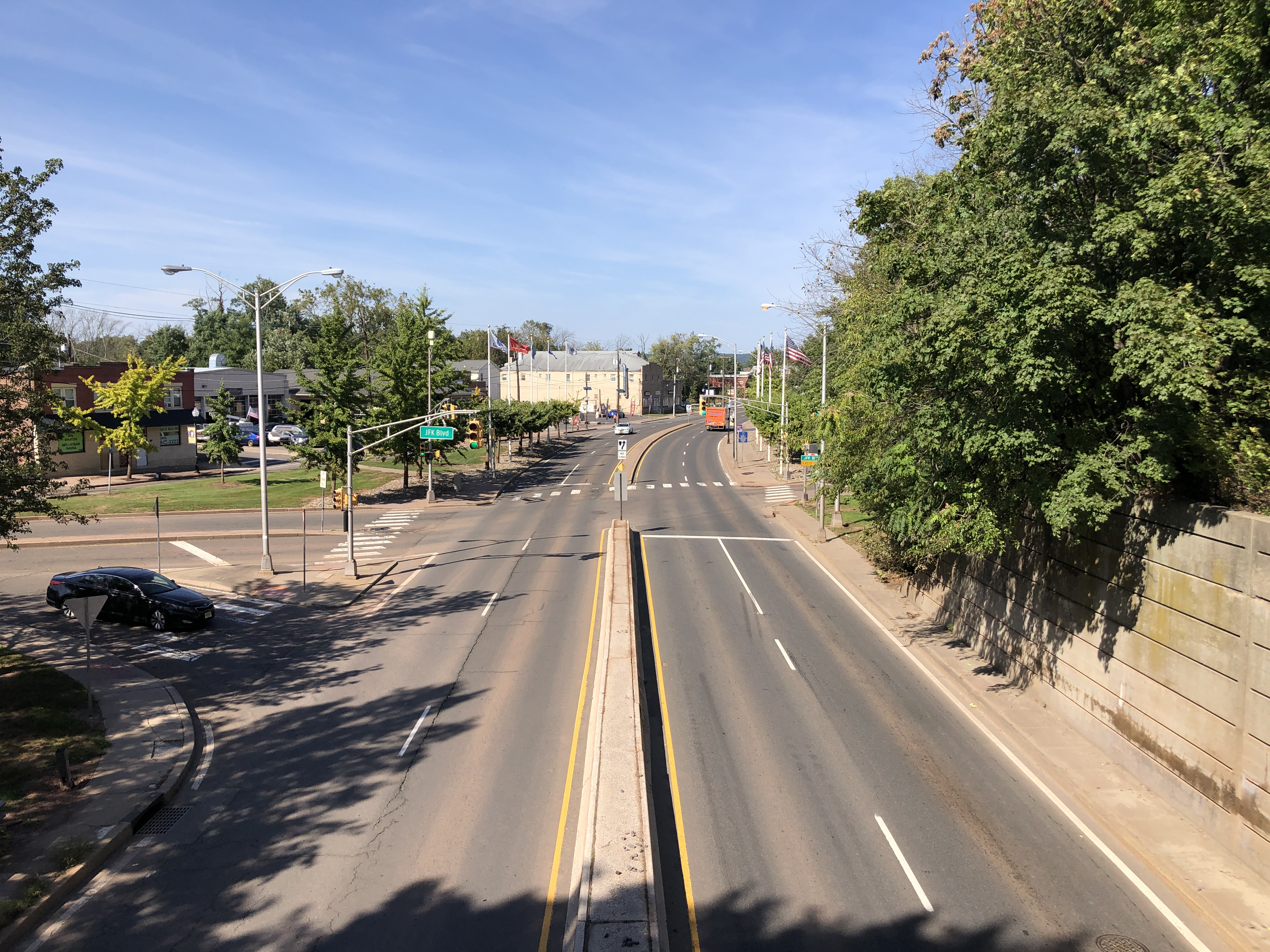
County Route 533 in Manville

=== Roads and highways ===
As of May 2010, the borough had a total of 42.07 miles (67.71 km) of roadways, of which 39.19 miles (63.07 km) were maintained by the municipality and 2.88 miles (4.63 km) by Somerset County.

No Interstate, U.S. or state highways directly serve Manville. The most prominent roadway in the borough is County Route 533. Also, the borough includes County Route 608.

=== Public transportation ===
Somerset County provides SCOOT bus service in the borough on its R1, R2 and Peak routes.

=== Rail ===
The Norfolk Southern Railway Lehigh Line, the Conrail Shared Assets Operations Lehigh Line, and the CSX Transportation Trenton Subdivision freight lines all connect at Port Reading Junction in Manville.

== Redevelopment ==
The Federal Superfund project called The Federal Creosote Site was cleaned up by the United States Environmental Protection Agency (EPA) with $250 million of public funds. The Superfund cleanup project was performed in a 35-acre (140,000 m^{2}) residential section of town called Claremont Development and in a 15-acre (61,000 m^{2}) commercial area called the Rustic Mall, and was officially declared complete by the EPA on March 7, 2008.

== Flooding problems ==
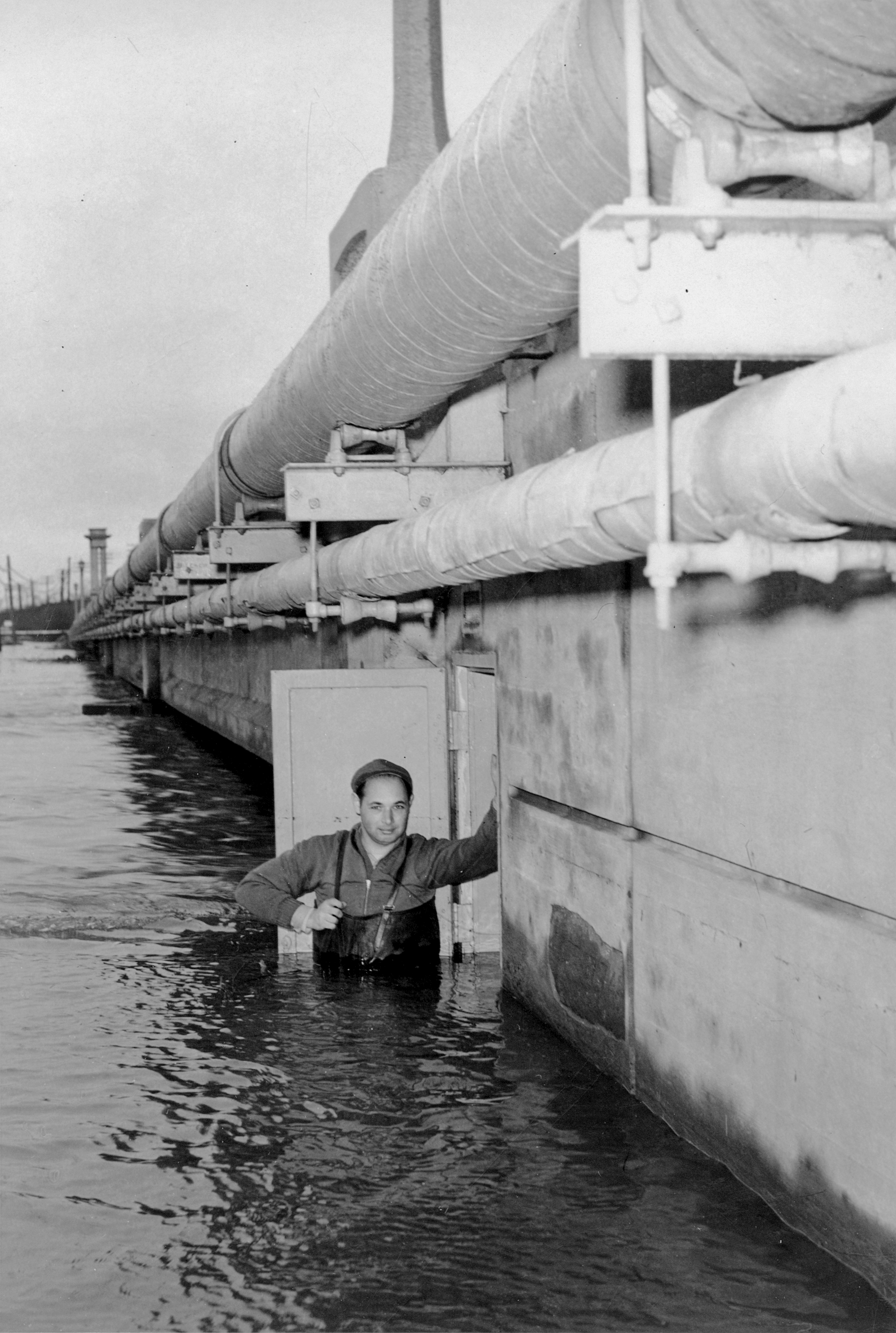
Gauge inspector and the Manville gage house built into the Van Veghten's Bridge abutment during the Raritan River flood of December 31, 1948

Manville suffers from occasional flooding events that occur after prolonged heavy rainfall events, when the Raritan River and Millstone River overflow their banks into the northern section (Raritan) and the Lost Valley section (Millstone) of the borough. The southern parts of Main Street also suffer from the flooding, due to the presence of Royce Brook which backs up with water from the nearby Millstone River in which it empties.

There are studies being undertaken to address the flooding problems in the Millstone River basin and Manville; however, none of the flood control ideas in the Millstone River basin have gotten beyond the initial study stages as of late 2006.

=== Hurricane Floyd flood of 1999 ===
Manville was severely hit by a flood in the wake of Hurricane Floyd in September 1999, which dropped 10 to 12 inches (250 to 300 mm) of rain in the areas surrounding the borough. The floods devastated the Lost Valley section, some of the South side area along Main Street and a large portion of the North side. Water levels reached between 12 feet (3.7 m) and 17 feet (5.2 m) in parts of the borough on September 17, 1999. The only way residents could get help was by boat or helicopter. There was also a large amount of fuel oil floating on the flood water which further damaged homes, many of which came off their foundations.

A portion of the north side received water coming from the Raritan at Dukes Parkway. Much of the north side had no flooding, though the significant flooding of the northside was concentrated from Dukes Parkway to Louis Street and Main Street to 3rd Avenue. The water reached the freight tracks at Main Street, and spilled over, flooding some on the South Street side, but leaving tons of water dammed in on the North Street side, where people had to be rescued from rooftops, or second floor windows and landings, by boat.

The problem was doubled in the Lost Valley section, as flood waters backed up where the Raritan and Millstone rivers meet near the dam. All trapped and injured people had to be taken out by helicopter, as there was no way to get in or out of the Lost Valley section. The September 1999 flood disaster was the worst ever to hit Manville, although it had been flooded in 1971 during Tropical Storm Doria, when many of the Lost Valley houses were destroyed and their foundations lost, and previously before that in the 1950s. Because of the railroad tracks being so much higher than the Lost Valley land, Manville's Lost Valley will always be a number one target for flooding. Through research of Manville's history, Lost Valley was to remain open land due to the high risk of flood.

=== Lost Valley flooding ===
Manville is where the Raritan River and the tributary Millstone River join together, in the far northeastern corner of the borough. The Lost Valley section in eastern Manville is situated on the natural flood plain between the Raritan and Millstone Rivers and bears the brunt of occasional flooding events which affect the river basins. The Lost Valley section is named so because it is generally disconnected from the rest of the borough with only a tunnel at Kyle Street and a bridge at Bridge Street crossing the railroad tracks to the neighborhood. Hurricane Floyd in September 1999 produced a particularly severe flood (a record for the river basins) in Manville, especially in the Lost Valley section of the borough, which experienced flooding all the way to the railroad tracks, with twelve feet or more water on many properties, which inundated houses with damaging flood waters. Another severe and devastating flood event occurred in Lost Valley during the April 2007 Nor'easter. It also left many homes and businesses underwater and was the worst flood since Hurricane Floyd. Flooding problems once again occurred in Manville on March 14, 2010, with rivers running already high due to recent snow melt along with 3 to 4 inches (76 to 102 mm) of rain that fell on the area on March 13, flooding was inevitable. More extensive flooding affected Manville in August 2011 when Hurricane Irene passed through New Jersey. In the aftermath of Hurricane Sandy in late October 2012, Manville did not flood but the powerful winds left many homes without power for several days.

=== Hurricane Ida floods ===
On September 1, 2021, the tropical remains of Hurricane Ida swept through Manville, causing floods in the majority of the town. The nearby Raritan river was flooded to a record 27.66 feet (8.43 m), shattering the previous 27.1 feet recorded by Hurricane Floyd. On September 2, 2021, a house on Boesel Avenue exploded after the residents of the home had already evacuated, and nearby on North Second Avenue, another exploded and engulfed a home next to it, burning down as firefighters were unable to access the home due to the heavy floodwaters. That night, a local banquet hall, The Saffron, exploded and burned to the ground early Friday morning.

=== Flood gauge on Raritan River ===
Flooding occurs at a 14-foot (4.3 m) stage, and severe flooding occurs when the water reaches 18 feet (5.5 m). The National Oceanic and Atmospheric Administration provides access to real time river level data.

== Notable people ==
People who were born in, residents of, or otherwise closely associated with Manville include:

- Cheryl Chase (born 1958), voice actress
- Joe Lis (1946–2010), Major League Baseball player
- Joseph D. Patero (1932–2020), politician who served as mayor of Manville and in the New Jersey General Assembly from 1974 to 1986 and from 1988 to 1991
- Theo Riddick (born 1991), professional football player who played in the NFL for the Las Vegas Raiders
- Edward Rogalski (born 1942), 12th president of St. Ambrose University in Davenport, Iowa, serving from 1987 to 2007
- Robert Sikoryak (born 1964), cartoonist
- Al Tasnady (1930–1988), stock car racing driver who later served as race director for Flemington Speedway
