= Federal Creosote Superfund site =

50-acre property in Manville, New Jersey

Coordinates: 40.5442°N 74.5831°W

The Federal Creosote Superfund site is a 50-acre (20 ha) property located in Manville, New Jersey. It was used as a wood treatment facility. Starting in 1919, the site was contaminated with creosote, a category of carbonaceous chemicals formed by the distillation of various tars and by pyrolysis of plant-derived material, such as wood or fossil fuel. They are typically used as preservatives or antiseptics. It took the EPA about 18 years to cleanup the site.

== Origins ==
The Superfund site was a former wood treatment facility in Manville, New Jersey. It was later developed into homes and a shopping center, where creosote was discovered.

=== Town history ===
Manville is a borough in Somerset County. The site was located in areas that in 1960 were later known as Claremont Development and Rustic Mall. Claremont Development is the residential area where homes were built and Rustic Mall is a shopping center. It lies on a 50 acre property. In 1997 a sinkhole emerged at the development. Creosote was discovered during removal of soil near the sinkhole.

=== Company history ===
The Federal Creosoting Company was a wood treatment facility. They treated railroad ties and telephone poles. The site had a number of buildings and above ground tanks that contained creosote. The creosote went into two lagoons and the treated wood would drip into the soil.

== Superfund designation ==
=== State intervention ===
In 1996 when homeowners were living at the site, a man discovered a tar like substance coming from his sump pump. It was soon discovered to be creosote, which is considered a hazardous chemical. This brought attention to the EPA of the issues left behind from the Federal Creosote Site. They started to test the surrounding areas and found creosote in 31 of the 137 homes. In response, by 1998 the site was proposed to the National Priorities List by the United States Environmental Protection Agency and it was added the following year. Eight months later EPA decided their course of action and two days later they started the cleanup. Homes and businesses needed to be relocated during this time. Public funds helped to fund all of the work that was done.

=== National intervention ===
The EPA designated the location a Superfund site and its intention to cleanup the site by 2014. The New Jersey Department of Environmental Protection deemed the site to have no significant threat to public health or the environment.

== Health and environmental hazards ==
Creosote was found in the soil and groundwater of the areas surrounding the site. When in action, the substance would release into lagoons and drip on the top layer of the soil. This later had a dangerous effect on homeowners in the development.

=== Groundwater ===
Creosote containing chemicals such as NPH dispersed into lagoons and it became dangerous for anyone drinking and coming in contact with the groundwater.

=== Soil ===
Chemicals (nph) leaked into soil and also formed sludge that was dangerous to anyone exposed. It caused families to relocate due to health problems. One man had the sludge coming out of his sump pump.

== Cleanup ==
The clean up process had three phases which were all completed successfully. The site is now habitable, and everyone was able to move back into the development.

=== Initial cleanup ===
Cleanup was done in three phases. "In Phase 1, source material from subsurface disposal canals and lagoons was removed from residential properties and borough right-of-ways. In Phase 2, residual levels of contaminants in soil above the cleanup goals were removed from residential properties. In Phase 3, source material and residually contaminated soils were removed from the Rustic Mall property." The site has been removed from the list and is habitable again.

=== Current status ===
The steps taken in the clean up have allowed for the site to be deemed clear and safe for humans to live on again. All of the unsafe exposure has been controlled and there is prevention of coming into contact with these substances.

== Controversy ==
A man was indicted for a kickback scheme during the cleanup of the site. The individual was paid to pick a specific subcontractor, which the EPA unknowingly paid for.
