= Wall Street station (IRT Lexington Avenue Line) =

New York City Subway station in Manhattan

Wall Street
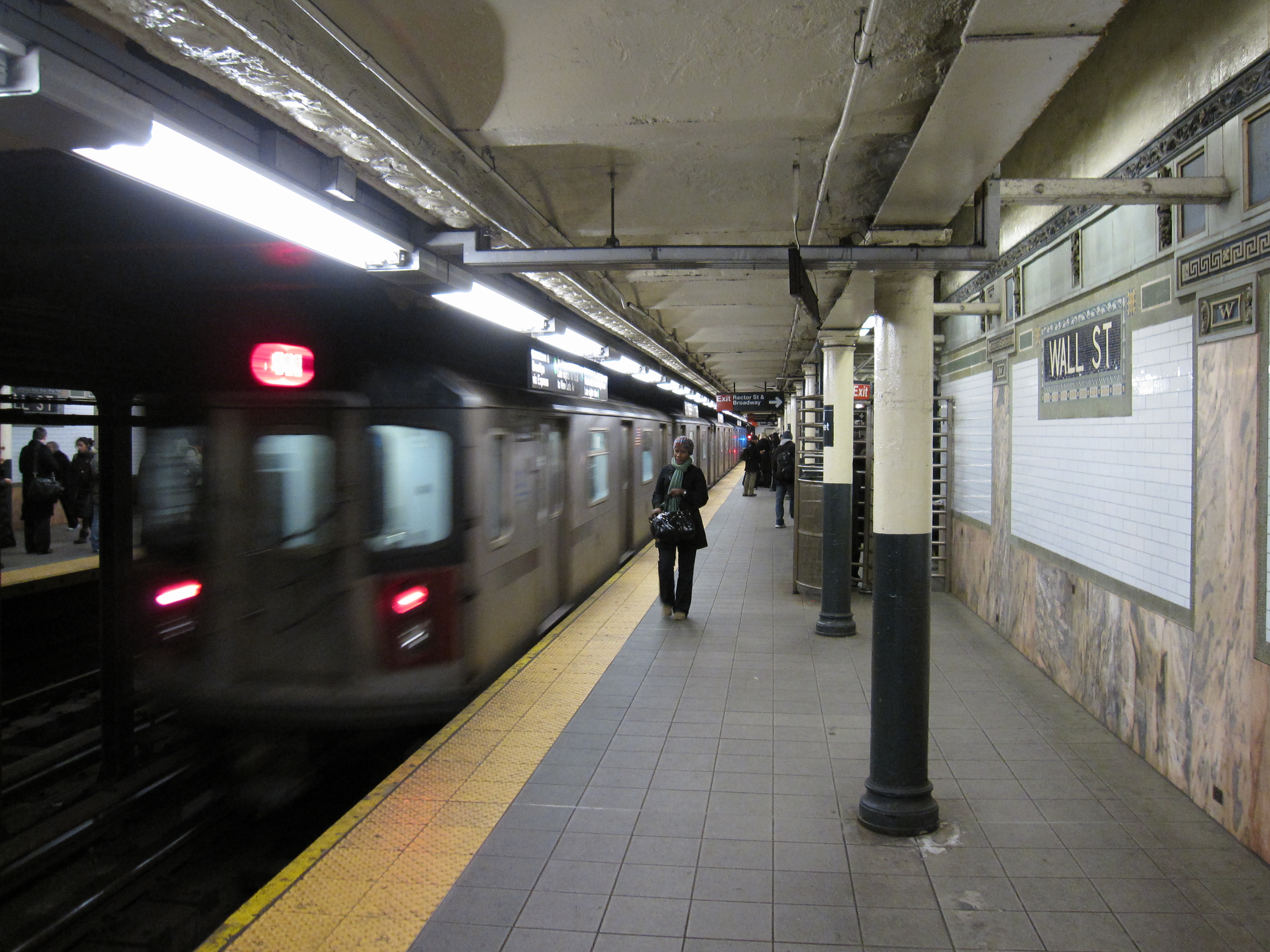
- Downtown 4 train leaving Wall Street

Station statistics
- Address: Wall Street & Broadway; New York, New York
- Borough: Manhattan
- Locale: Financial District
- Coordinates: 40.70771°N 74.011717°W
- Division: A (IRT)
- Line: IRT Lexington Avenue Line
- Services: 4 (all times); 5 (all except late nights)
- Transit: NYCT Bus: M55, SIM1, SIM2, SIM4, SIM32, SIM34, X27, X28; MTA Bus: BxM18; NJT Bus: 120
- Structure: Underground
- Platforms: 2 side platforms
- Tracks: 2

Other information
- Opened: June 12, 1905; 121 years ago

Traffic
- 2025: 3,810,571 ▲6.1%
- Rank: 95 out of 423
Services
Preceding station	New York City Subway	Following station
Fulton Street 4 5 via 138th Street–Grand Concourse	4 (New York City Subway service) 5 (New York City Subway service)	Bowling Green 4 5 via Franklin Avenue–Medgar Evers College
Location
Location within New York City Subway
Location within New York City
Location within New York
Track layout
Street map
Station service legend
Symbol	Description
Stops all times except late nights	Stops all times except late nights
Stops all times	Stops all times
- Wall Street Subway Station (IRT)
- U.S. National Register of Historic Places
- New York State Register of Historic Places
- New York City Landmark
- Location within New York City Location within New York Location within the United States
- Location: Under Broadway at Wall Street, New York, NY 10016
- Coordinates: 40°42′27″N 74°0′44″W
- Area: less than one acre
- Built: 1905
- Architect: Parsons, William Barclay; Heins, George L., et al
- Architectural style: Beaux Arts
- MPS: New York City Subway System MPS
- NRHP reference No.: 04001011
- NYSRHP No.: 06101.008198
- NYCL No.: 1096

Significant dates
- Added to NRHP: September 17, 2004
- Designated NYSRHP: July 20, 2004
- Designated NYCL: October 23, 1979

The Wall Street station (referred to on some strip maps as Wall Street–Broadway) is a station on the IRT Lexington Avenue Line of the New York City Subway. The station is located at the intersection of Broadway and Wall Street in the Financial District of Lower Manhattan. It is served by the 4 train at all times and the 5 train at all times except late nights.

The Wall Street station was constructed for the Interborough Rapid Transit Company (IRT) as part of the city's first subway line, which was approved in 1900. Construction of the tunnel around the Wall Street station was complicated by the shallow foundations of the nearby Trinity Church, as well as the need to avoid disrupting the street surface of Broadway. The station opened on June 12, 1905, as an extension of the original line. The station's platforms were lengthened in the late 1950s, and it was renovated in the 1970s and 2000s.

The Wall Street station contains two side platforms and two tracks, and it was built with tile and mosaic decorations. The platforms contain exits to Broadway's intersections with Wall and Rector Streets, outside Trinity Church, and into the basements of several buildings. An additional passageway extends east to an out-of-system connection with the Broad Street station and the basement of 28 Liberty Street. The original station interior is a New York City designated landmark and listed on the National Register of Historic Places.

== History ==
=== Construction and opening ===
Planning for a subway line in New York City dates to 1864. However, development of what would become the city's first subway line did not start until 1894, when the New York State Legislature passed the Rapid Transit Act. The subway plans were drawn up by a team of engineers led by William Barclay Parsons, the Rapid Transit Commission's chief engineer. The Rapid Transit Construction Company, organized by John B. McDonald and funded by August Belmont Jr., signed the initial Contract 1 with the Rapid Transit Commission in February 1900, in which it would construct the subway and maintain a 50-year operating lease from the opening of the line. In 1901, the firm of Heins & LaFarge was hired to design the underground stations. Belmont incorporated the Interborough Rapid Transit Company (IRT) in April 1902 to operate the subway.

Several days after Contract 1 was signed, the Board of Rapid Transit Railroad Commissioners instructed Parsons to evaluate the feasibility of extending the subway south to South Ferry, and then to Brooklyn. On January 24, 1901, the Board adopted a route that would extend the subway from City Hall to the Long Island Rail Road (LIRR)'s Flatbush Avenue terminal station (now known as Atlantic Terminal) in Brooklyn, via the Joralemon Street Tunnel under the East River. Contract 2, which gave the IRT a 35-year lease, was executed between the commission and the Rapid Transit Construction Company on September 11, 1902. Construction began at State Street in Manhattan on November 8, 1902. The section of the Contract 2 subway tunnel under the southernmost section of Broadway, between Battery Park and City Hall, was contracted to Degnon-McLean Contracting Company.

Contract 2 specified that traffic upon the streets of lower Manhattan not be disrupted. At its shallowest, the tunnel would be only 4 or 5 feet (1.2 or 1.5 m) below the bottoms of the street car conduits along Broadway. Accordingly, the contractor proposed replacing the pavement with a planked roadway and excavating beneath this temporary surface. To address concerns that leakage from the gas mains beneath the roadway and within the excavation would produce a devastating explosion, the contractor moved the pipes to above the street. Furthermore, precautionary measures had to be undertaken during the construction of the tunnel in front of Trinity Church, adjacent to the Wall Street station. The spire of the church rested upon a shallow masonry foundation built upon a deep layer of fine sand. The spire's foundation was 9 feet (2.7 m) behind the subway tunnel's exterior wall, and the bottom of the spire foundation was 9 feet (2.7 m) below street level, much shallower than the subway's 24-foot-deep (7.3 m) foundation. Accordingly, the 57-foot (17 m) tunnel nearest the spire's foundation was constructed in three sections, and steel channels were used as sheet piling around the subway excavation. After the excavation was completed, these steel channels were left in place to prevent the soil from settling. No "measurable or movement of the spire" occurred during or after construction.

By the beginning of June 1905, the station was expected to open on June 17. The Wall Street station opened on June 12, 1905, as a one-stop extension of the original subway from Fulton Street. A switch was added south of Rector Street to allow trains to terminate at the Wall Street station. The station's opening contributed to the growth of Wall Street, which had become the center of Manhattan's Financial District at the beginning of the 20th century.

=== 1900s to 1940s ===
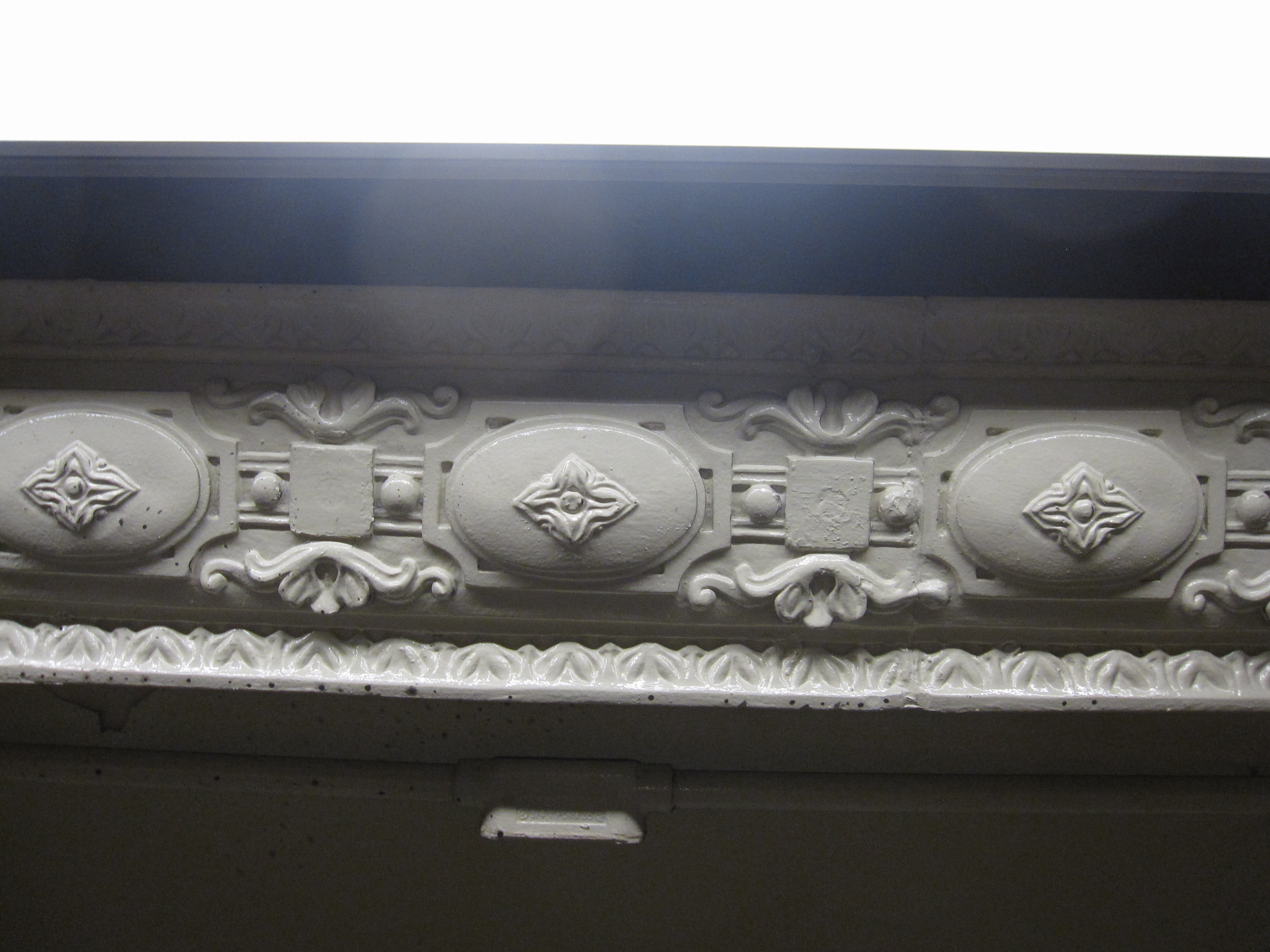
Decorated ceiling elements

To address overcrowding, in 1909, the New York Public Service Commission proposed lengthening the platforms at stations along the original IRT subway. As part of a modification to the IRT's construction contracts made on January 18, 1910, the company was to lengthen station platforms to accommodate ten-car express and six-car local trains. In addition to $1.5 million (equivalent to $51.8 million in 2025) spent on platform lengthening, $500,000 (equivalent to $17.3 million in 2025) was spent on building additional entrances and exits. It was anticipated that these improvements would increase capacity by 25 percent. The northbound platform at the Wall Street station was extended 165 feet (50 m) to the south, while the southbound platform was extended 135 feet (41 m) to the north. The southbound platform extension required installing new girders and columns at Trinity Church, while the northbound platform extension abutted the basements of adjacent properties. On January 23, 1911, ten-car express trains began running on the East Side Line, and the next day, ten-car express trains began running on the West Side Line.

In 1910, the IRT reported that a passageway would be constructed to the basement of the planned Equitable Office Building, on the east side of Broadway, just north of the Wall Street station. That office building was proposed in 1908 on the site of the Equitable Life Building, which ultimately burned down in 1912. An agreement was signed between the IRT, the Equitable Building Corporation, and the city in January 1915, providing for a passageway from the building's basement to the northern ends of both platforms. Construction of the passageways started in October 1915. The entrance to the Equitable Building, as well as others to 7 Wall Street and 65 Broadway, opened in 1917. One block south of the Equitable Building, the Irving Trust Company started developing a skyscraper at 1 Wall Street, at the southwest corner of Broadway and Wall Street, in 1930. That March, Irving Trust signed an agreement with the IRT to build three new entrances to the Wall Street station on Broadway and another entrance in 1 Wall Street's basement. Two entrances to the northbound platform opened in March 1931, after 1 Wall Street was completed. One entrance led to the building's basement, while another led to New Street through a passageway in the building.

=== 1940s to 1980s ===
The city government took over the IRT's operations on June 12, 1940. The New York City Transit Authority (NYCTA) announced plans in 1956 to add fluorescent lights above the edges of the station's platforms. The lights were installed the next year. In late 1959, contracts were awarded to extend the platforms at Bowling Green, Wall Street, Canal Street, Spring Street, Bleecker Street, Astor Place, Grand Central–42nd Street, 86th Street, and 125th Street to 525 feet (160 m). In April 1960, work began on a $3,509,000 project (equivalent to $38.2 million in 2025) to lengthen platforms at seven of these stations to accommodate ten-car trains. To accommodate the project, the Trinity Building entrance at 111 Broadway was closed from July 1960 to July 1962. The entire platform-lengthening project was substantially completed by November 1965.

In 1979, the New York City Landmarks Preservation Commission designated the space within the boundaries of the original station, excluding expansions made after 1904, as a city landmark. The station was designated along with eleven others on the original IRT. During the late 1970s and early 1980s, the station was renovated; much of the original wall surface on the northbound platform was covered by glossy dark blue tiles about 0.5 inches (13 mm) thick. The renovation preserved the station name plaques and mosaics. The Wall Street station's renovation was the first of six projects under the Metropolitan Transportation Authority (MTA)'s Adopt-a-Station program. Fundraising efforts were led by the Downtown Lower Manhattan Association, which enlisted support from the Chase Manhattan Bank and American Express, two companies whose buildings were directly served by the station.

=== 1990s to present ===
On January 6, 1994, Automated Fare Collection turnstiles went into service at this station and at the Whitehall Street station. In 1995, as a result of service reductions, the MTA was considering permanently closing one of the two Wall Street stations, as well as two other stations citywide, due to their proximity to each other. Either the IRT Broadway–Seventh Avenue Line station or the IRT Lexington Avenue Line station would have been closed. Following the September 11 attacks in 2001, the Wall Street station was closed for nine days.

The original interiors were listed on the National Register of Historic Places in 2004. The next year, the MTA provided funding for a renovation of the station as part of its 2005–2009 capital program. The MTA commenced a project to renovate the station and restore its original appearance in 2006. During this renovation, the blue tiles were removed, and the original tiles were restored. Some of the panels and beams on the ceiling were installed improperly, causing trains to scrape against them.

== Station layout ==
Wall Street has two tracks and two side platforms. The 4 train stops here at all times, while the 5 train stops here at all times except late nights. The station is between Fulton Street to the north and Bowling Green to the south. The platforms were originally 350 feet (110 m) long, like at other Contract 2 stations, but were lengthened during the 1959 expansion of the station. The northbound platform was extended southward and became 523 feet (159 m) long, while the southbound platform was extended northward and became 583 feet (178 m) long. There are two underpasses between the platforms, one each at the northern and southern ends of the southbound platform, which lead respectively to a passageway and to the center of the northbound platform.

=== Design ===
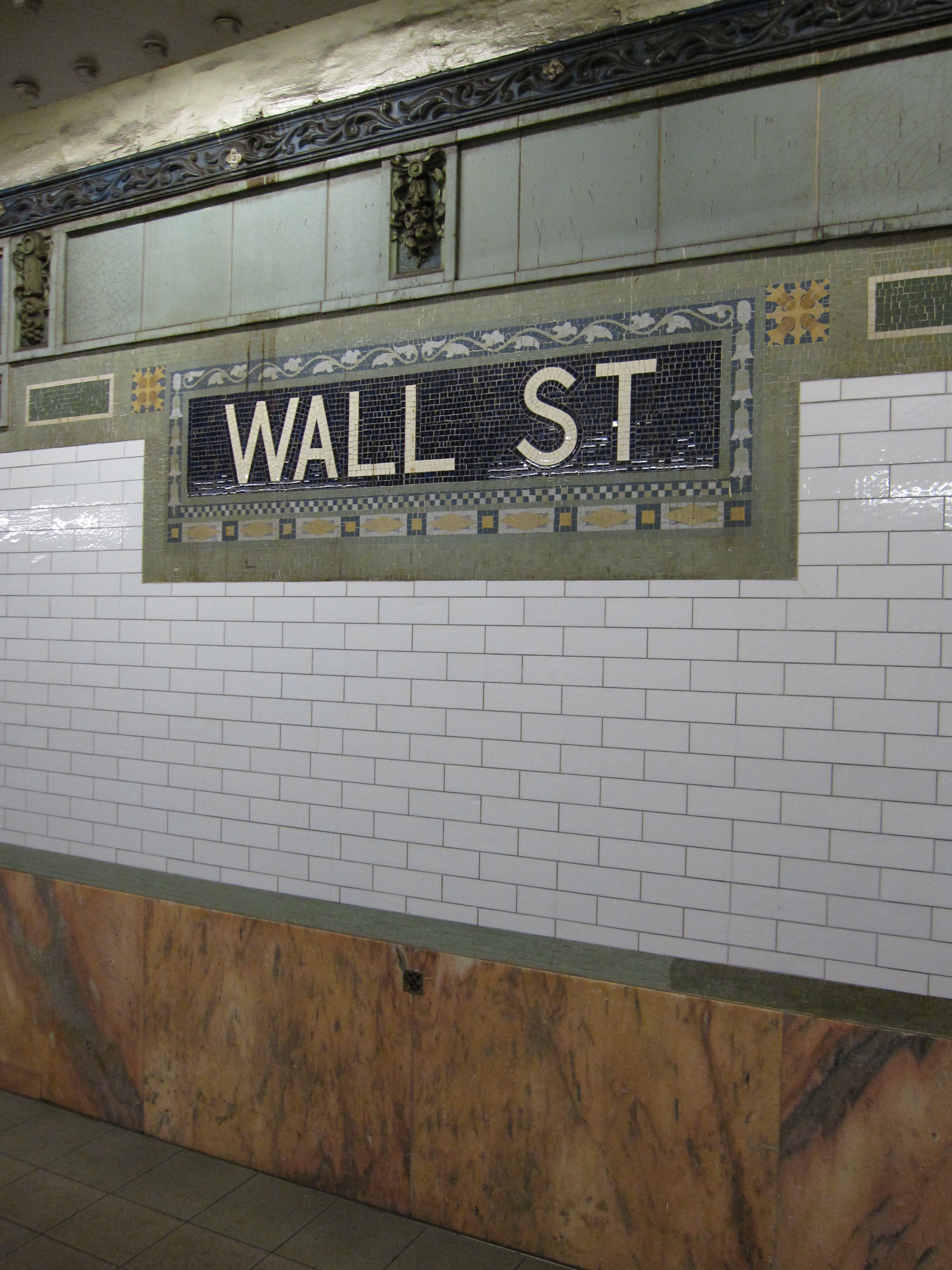
Platform wall

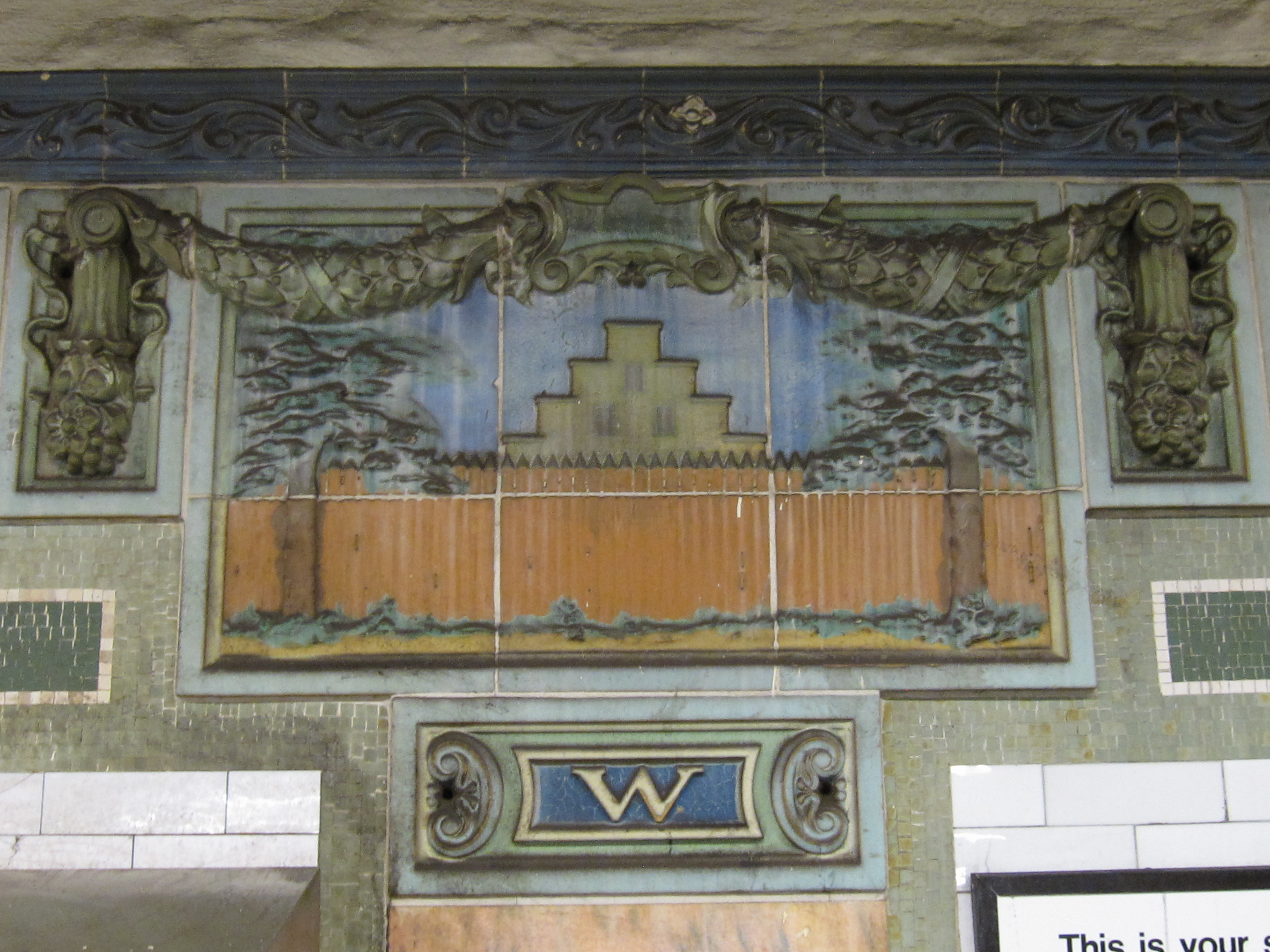
Faience plaque depicting the wall at New Amsterdam

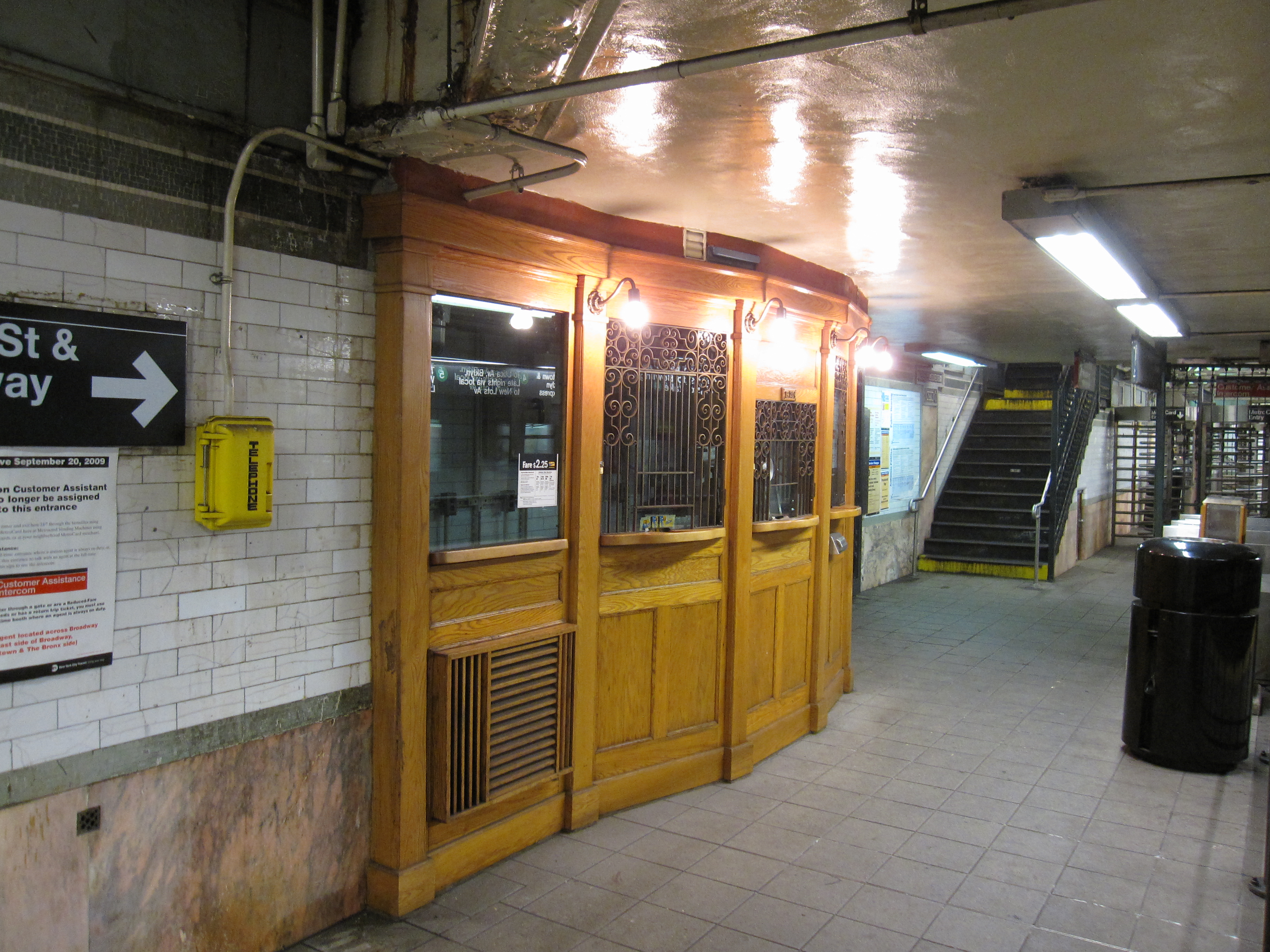
Disused ticket booth on the southbound platform

As with other stations built as part of the original IRT, the station was constructed using a cut-and-cover method. The tunnel is covered by a U-shaped trough that contains utility pipes and wires. This trough contains a foundation of concrete no less than 4 inches (100 mm) thick. Each platform consists of 3-inch-thick (7.6 cm) concrete slabs, beneath which are drainage basins. The original platforms contain circular, cast-iron Doric-style columns away from the platform edge, spaced every 15 feet (4.6 m), while the platform extensions contain I-beam columns near the platform edge. Additional columns between the tracks, spaced every 5 feet (1.5 m), support the jack-arched concrete station roofs. The ceiling height varies based on whether there are utilities in the ceiling. There is a 1-inch (25 mm) gap between the trough wall and the platform walls, which are made of 4-inch (100 mm)-thick brick covered over by a tiled finish.

The fare control areas are at platform level. The walls along the platforms near the fare control areas consist of a pink marble wainscoting on the lowest part of the wall, with bronze air vents along the wainscoting, and white glass tiles above. The platform walls are divided at 15-foot (4.6 m) intervals by pink marble pilasters, or vertical bands. In the original portion of the station, each pilaster is topped by blue-and-green tile plaques, which contain the letter "W" surrounded by a Greek key carving. Above these "W" plaques are faience mosaics that depict a step-gabled house in New Amsterdam with the palisade wall in front of it, a reference to the namesake of Wall Street. These mosaics are topped by blue faience swags and are connected by a faience cornice with scrolled and foliate detail. This decorative design is extended to the fare control areas adjacent to the original portions of the station. White-on-blue tile plaques with the words "Wall Street" and floral motifs are also placed on the walls. The platform extensions contain similar decorative elements. The ceilings contain plaster molding.

On the southbound platform is a disused oak token booth, the last of its kind in the New York City Subway system, which is just south of the stairs leading to Wall Street. The booth is separated into panels that are slightly chamfered, or angled away from each other. Above the panels are windows, some with brass scrollwork screens. A ticket chopper is north of the token booth. Beneath the street stairs leading to Wall Street are wooden doorways that formerly led to men's and women's restrooms, with corresponding marble lintels.

Also on the platforms are Lariat Tapers, which are bronze loops attached to the columns to serve as seating. These were designed by James Garvey in 2011, as a follow-up to his Lariat Seat Loops at 33rd Street, commissioned in 1997.

=== Exits ===
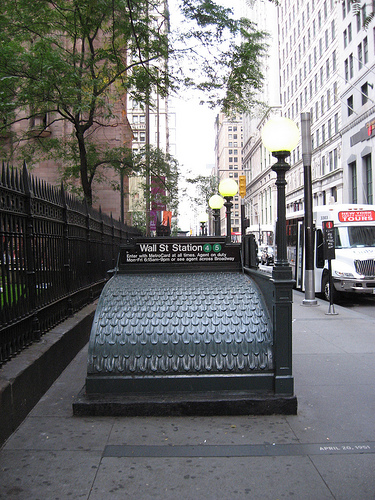
Downtown entrance at Trinity Church, with cast iron hood

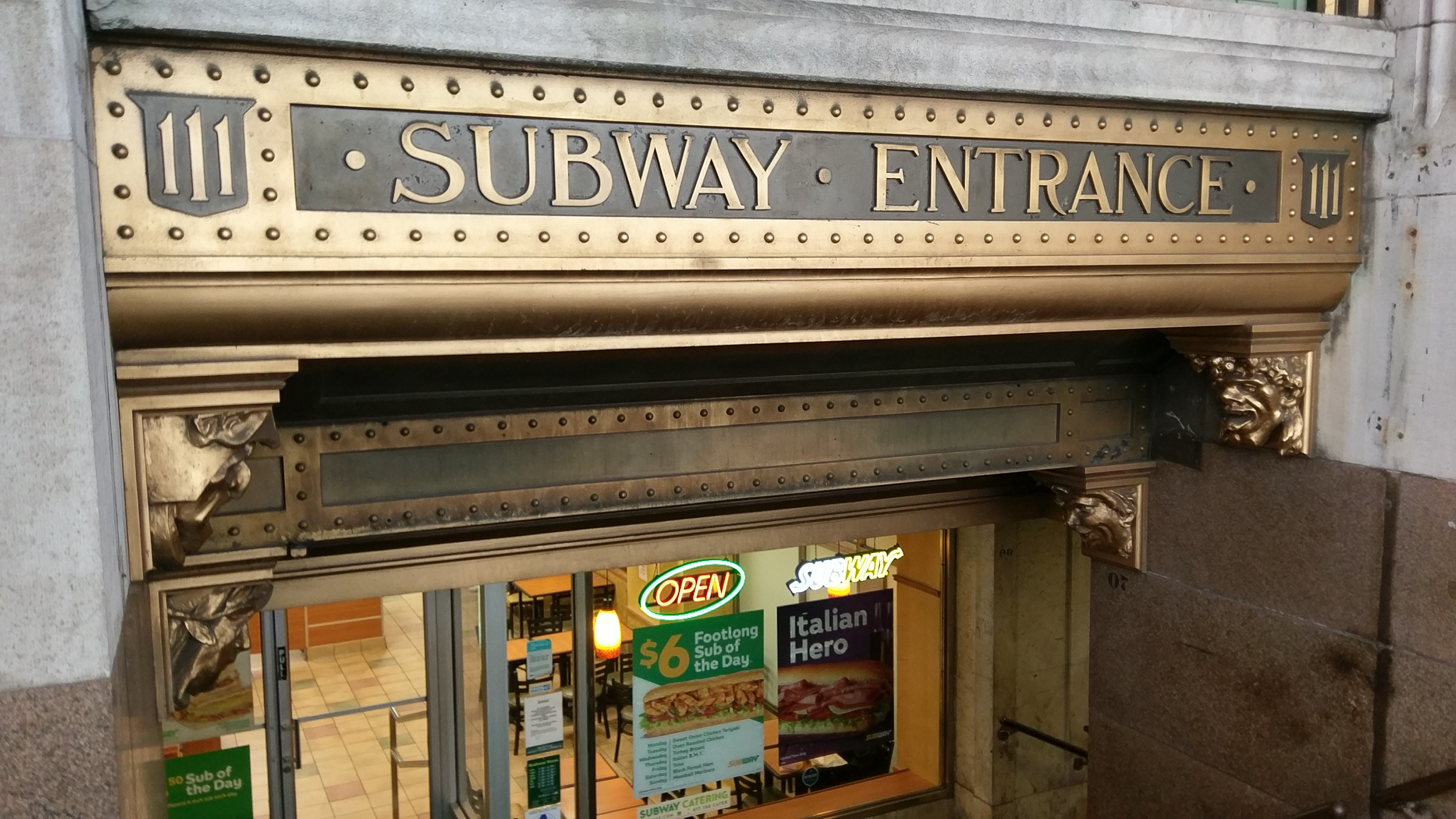
Subway restaurant in Trinity Building subway entrance

The exits for the southbound platform are on the west side of Broadway. At the southern end of the platform, two stairs are built into the facade of 71 Broadway, south of Rector Street, with one stair on either side of that building's main entrance. These staircases combine into one wide stairway that leads down to platform level. Another exit just north of Rector Street leads to two street stairs, which ascend to the western side of Broadway at Wall Street, outside the Trinity Churchyard fence. These street stairs retain cast-iron hoods with leaf patterns, which are part of the original design; the Wall Street station is one of two stations to retain such hoods, the other being the Borough Hall station in Brooklyn. At the north end of the station a street exit is built into the side of the Trinity Building at 111 Broadway. It has an opulent brass-toned banner proclaiming "Subway Entrance" atop the entrance, which is half a flight below ground. During the 2010s, the exit had a Subway restaurant outside fare control.

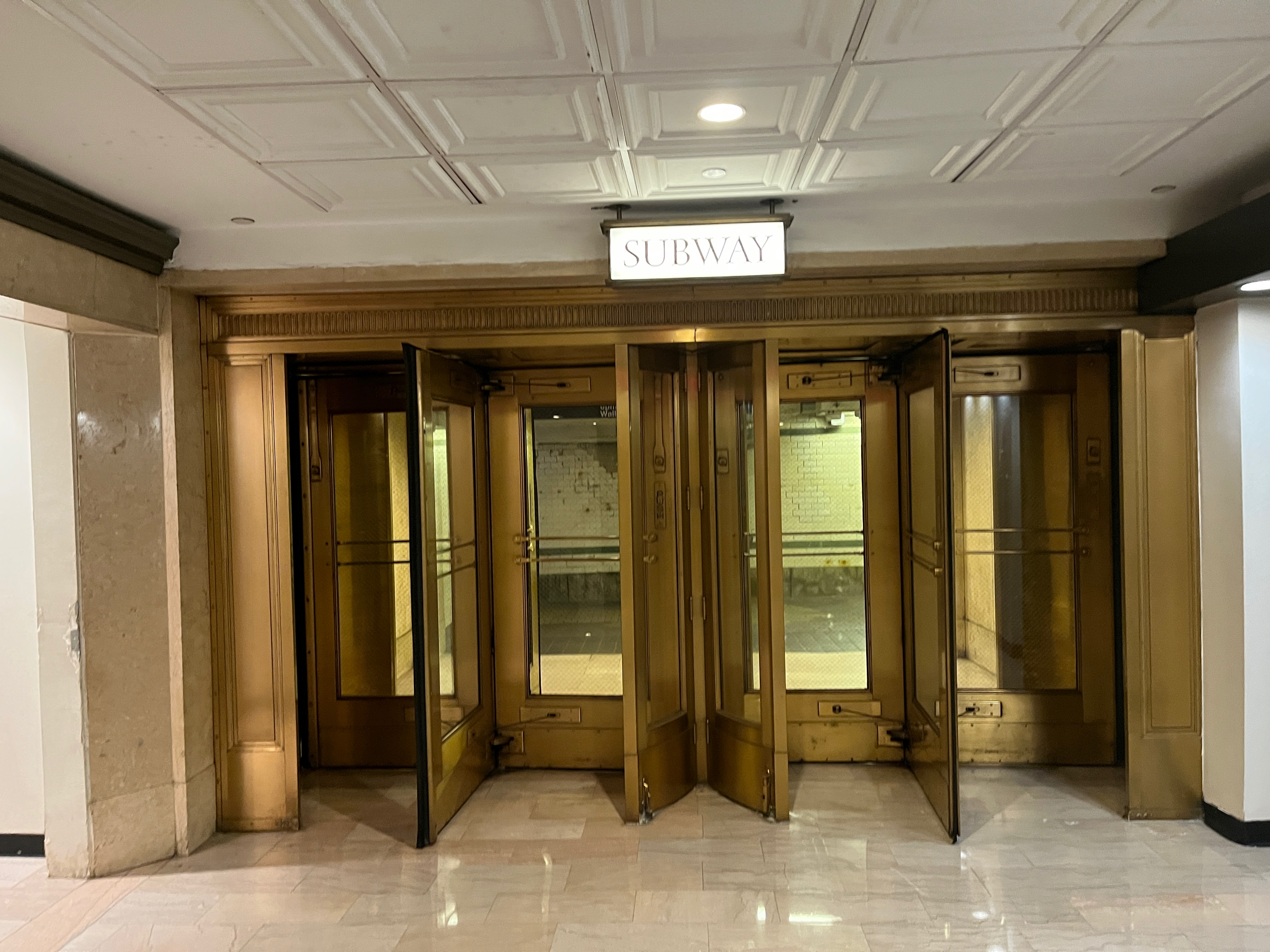
An entrance underneath the Equitable Building

There are numerous closed exits along the southbound platform. Within the fare control area at the south end of the station, a passageway led to the American Express Building at 65 Broadway, adjacent to the stair to 71 Broadway. At the extreme southern end of the platform was a passageway to the Adams Express Building at 61 Broadway, which opened along with that building in 1915 and was closed after 1944. At the extreme northern end, next to the 111 Broadway entrance, another exit extended to the United States Realty Building at 115 Broadway, though this exit was closed sometime after 1947.

On the northbound side, three staircases lead to the east side of Broadway near Rector Street. Here, a closed-off passageway led to the basement of 1 Wall Street. These street staircases contain relatively simple, modern steel railings like those seen at most New York City Subway stations. The north end of the platform leads to a tunnel which connects on the left to a crossunder, and on the right to a passageway exiting fare control. The passageway outside fare control leads into the basement of the Equitable Building and continues to a street staircase at Cedar and Nassau Streets (28 Liberty Street) on the left. There is a connection to the Broad Street station (J and Z trains) and the Wall Street/William Street station (2 and 3 trains) on the right.

== See also ==
- List of New York City Designated Landmarks in Manhattan below 14th Street
- National Register of Historic Places listings in Manhattan below 14th Street
