= 1 Wall Street =

Residential skyscraper in Manhattan, New York

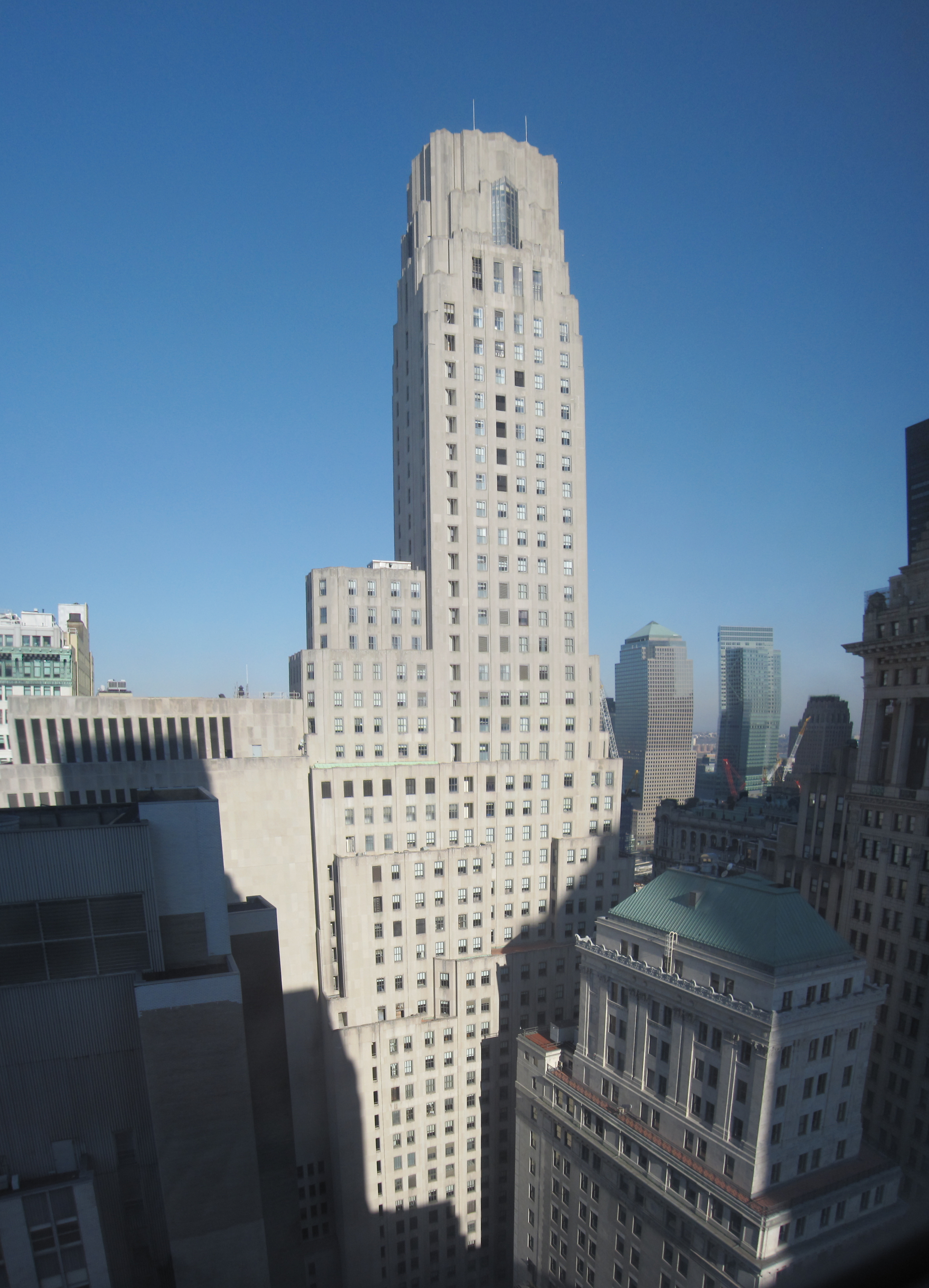
- Seen from the east in 2010

General information
- Type: Mixed use (residential and commercial)
- Architectural style: Art Deco
- Location: Manhattan, New York, United States
- Coordinates: 40°42′26″N 74°00′42″W
- Construction started: 1929 (original building); 1963 (annex)
- Completed: 1931 (original building); 1965 (annex)
- Opening: March 24, 1931
- Renovated: 2018–2023
- Owner: Macklowe Properties

Height
- Roof: 654 ft (199 m)
- Top floor: 52 (Note: The official figure of 50 floors excludes two extra dormer floors on the roof.)

Technical details
- Floor count: 50
- Floor area: 1,165,645 ft^{2} (108,292.0 m^{2})
- Lifts/elevators: 41

Design and construction
- Architect: Ralph Walker
- Developer: Irving Trust
- Main contractor: Marc Eidlitz

Website
- onewallstreet.com

New York City Landmark
- Designated: March 13, 2001
- Reference no.: 2029
- Designated entity: Original building: exterior

New York City Landmark
- Designated: June 25, 2024
- Reference no.: 2679
- Designated entity: Red Room: interior

U.S. Historic district – Contributing property
- Designated: February 20, 2007
- Part of: Wall Street Historic District
- Reference no.: 07000063

1 Wall Street (also known as the Irving Trust Company Building, the Bank of New York Building, and the BNY Mellon Building) is a 654-foot-tall (199 m) Art Deco skyscraper in the Financial District of Lower Manhattan, New York City, United States. The building, which occupies a full city block, consists of two sections. The original 50-story building was designed by Ralph Thomas Walker of the firm Voorhees, Gmelin and Walker and constructed between 1929 and 1931 for Irving Trust, an early-20th-century American bank. A 28-story annex to the south (later expanded to 36 stories) was designed by the successor firm Voorhees, Walker, Smith, Smith & Haines and built between 1963 and 1965.

The limestone facade consists of slight inwardly-curved bays with fluting to resemble curtains. On the lower stories are narrow windows and elaborate entrances. The massing of 1 Wall Street incorporates numerous small setbacks, and there are chamfers at the corners of the original building. The top of the original building consists of a freestanding tower with fluted windowless bays. The facade of the annex is crafted in a style reminiscent of the original structure. The original building has an ornate lobby, known as the Red Room, with colored mosaics. The 10th through 45th floors were originally rented to tenants, while the other floors contained offices, lounges, and other spaces for Irving Trust.

At the time of its construction, 1 Wall Street occupied what was one of the most valuable plots in the city. The building replaced three previous structures, including the Manhattan Life Insurance Building, which was once the world's tallest building. After Irving Trust was acquired by the Bank of New York (BNY) in 1988, 1 Wall Street served as the global headquarters of BNY and its successor BNY Mellon through 2015. After the developer Harry Macklowe purchased the building, he renovated it from 2018 to 2023, converting the interior into 566 condominium apartments with some commercial space. Sales of the condo units have been sluggish for Macklowe.

The building is one of New York City's Art Deco landmarks, although architectural critics initially ignored it in favor of such buildings as the Empire State Building and the Chrysler Building. The exterior of the building's original section was designated as a city landmark in 2001, and the Red Room was similarly designated in 2024. In addition, the structure is a contributing property to the Wall Street Historic District, a National Register of Historic Places district created in 2007.

== Site ==
1 Wall Street occupies an entire city block in the Financial District of Lower Manhattan in New York City, United States. The site is bounded by Broadway to the west, Wall Street to the north, New Street to the east, and Exchange Place to the south. 1 Wall Street is adjacent to the Adams Express Building, 65 Broadway, the Empire Building, Trinity Church, and Trinity Church's churchyard to the west; the American Surety Company Building to the north; 14 Wall Street to the northeast; the New York Stock Exchange Building to the east; and 52 Broadway to the south. Entrances to the New York City Subway's Wall Street station, served by the 4 and 5 trains, are adjacent to the building.

Because of the curves in the facade, the original structure does not completely occupy its full land lot; instead, 180 square feet (17 m^{2}) is used as a sidewalk. At the chamfered corners of the building, the facade is recessed as much as 7.5 feet (2.3 m) from the lot line. Under municipal law, any private land that was adjacent to public property (but not clearly marked as such) would eventually revert to the government of New York City. Consequently, when 1 Wall Street was built, its main occupant Irving Trust embedded small metal plaques to delineate the boundaries of its lot, thereby preventing the city government from seizing the land.

== Architecture ==
The original building was designed by Ralph Walker of the Voorhees, Gmelin and Walker in the Art Deco style. The annex was designed by Voorhees, Gmelin and Walker's successor firm Voorhees, Walker, Smith, Smith & Haines. Everett Meeks, the dean of the Yale School of Art, was the original building's design consultant. The original building reaches 50 stories and stands 654 feet (199 m) tall; the Council on Vertical Urbanism gives a conflicting value of 663 feet (202 m). The southern annex was originally 28 stories tall with a height of about 391 feet (119 m), but it was expanded in 2019 to 36 stories. SLCE Architects designed the building's residential conversion in the late 2010s and early 2020s, including the addition to the southern annex. Dormer structures of up to two stories are located on the tops of both sections.

Although author Daniel Abramson said 1 Wall Street was "Art Deco in many respects", historian Anthony Robins characterized the building as being "Gothic Modern—a skyscraper reflection of Trinity Church". Walker had designed other Art Deco buildings in the New York City area, mainly telecommunications structures. These included the Barclay–Vesey Building (1927), New Jersey Bell Headquarters Building (1929), 60 Hudson Street (1930), and 32 Avenue of the Americas (1932), as well as telephone buildings in upstate New York. Architectural writer Robert A. M. Stern characterized 1 Wall Street as "Walker's only completed skyscraper".

=== Form and facade ===
1 Wall Street's facade is made primarily of limestone. This contrasts with the brick facades of Walker's telecommunications buildings, the use of which was likely influenced by Dutch and German Expressionism. At the time of 1 Wall Street's construction, limestone was a relatively expensive material and was rarely used for a building's entire facade, with cheaper brick being used instead. 1 Wall Street also contains numerous setbacks on its exterior. Though setbacks in New York City skyscrapers were mandated by the 1916 Zoning Resolution to allow light and air to reach the streets below, they later became a defining feature of the Art Deco style. The facade has uninterrupted vertical piers, similar to other Art Deco buildings. Although the piers emphasize the building's height, Walker said this effect was not the main goal of his design.

==== Original building ====
Entrance to the original portion of 1 Wall Street

The original 1931 building is on the northern portion of the site. The first twenty stories occupy almost the entire site. The building has a series of small setbacks starting at the 21st story and continuing until the 35th story, above which a slender tower rises. The setbacks on the Broadway and Wall Street elevations alternate with each other. The southern portion of the original building rises as high as a dormer on the 37th floor; the 36th floor is the highest that also connects to the annex. The original structure measures 179 feet (55 m) on Broadway by 102 feet (31 m) on Wall Street. The tower stories, from the 37th to the 48th floors, measure 60 by 80 feet (18 by 24 m) each. The top two stories constituted an executive penthouse.

Walker's design emphasized the decorative details of the building's facade; by contrast, other early-20th-century skyscrapers in Lower Manhattan had emphasized the massing. The facade includes indented vertical bays with fluting, which are arranged like curtains, although the facade could also resemble a cliff-like natural shape from different angles. Walker said the building would "have 200 thousand people looking at it from all sides" in a single year, including workers and pedestrians, and he wanted them to have "mental relief and pleasure" when viewing it. Walker also said he "tried to superimpose one rhythm upon a basic rhythm"; as such, he treated the facade as a series of "rhythmic motifs" in different sizes. The resulting concave bays were angled inward at a pitch of 1:9. Each of the bays is separated by curved, projecting piers that rise to each setback. Several piers also have vertical incisions for emphasis. The windows of the original building contained custom curved frames to fit into the facade, which added $40,000 to the construction cost. (Note: About $662,000 in 2024 (Note: Johnston, Louis; Williamson, Samuel H. (2023). "What Was the U.S. GDP Then?". MeasuringWorth. United States Gross Domestic Product deflator figures follow the MeasuringWorth series.))

The base of the original building is composed of the lowest three stories. The section of the base along Wall Street is eight bays wide, with a double-width entrance in the middle of the Wall Street facade, which is reached by a short flight of stairs and leads to the main lobby. The entryway is framed by a jagged portal. The sections of the base on Broadway and New Street are seventeen bays wide. On the New Street elevation, the name "Voorhees, Gmelin & Walker" is printed in cursive script. There is an exposed granite basement on New Street with a service entrance. On the upper floors, each of the bays has a single sash window on each floor. The northwestern and northeastern corners of the building are both chamfered, which respectively connect the western and eastern elevations of the facade with the northern elevation.

==== Annex ====
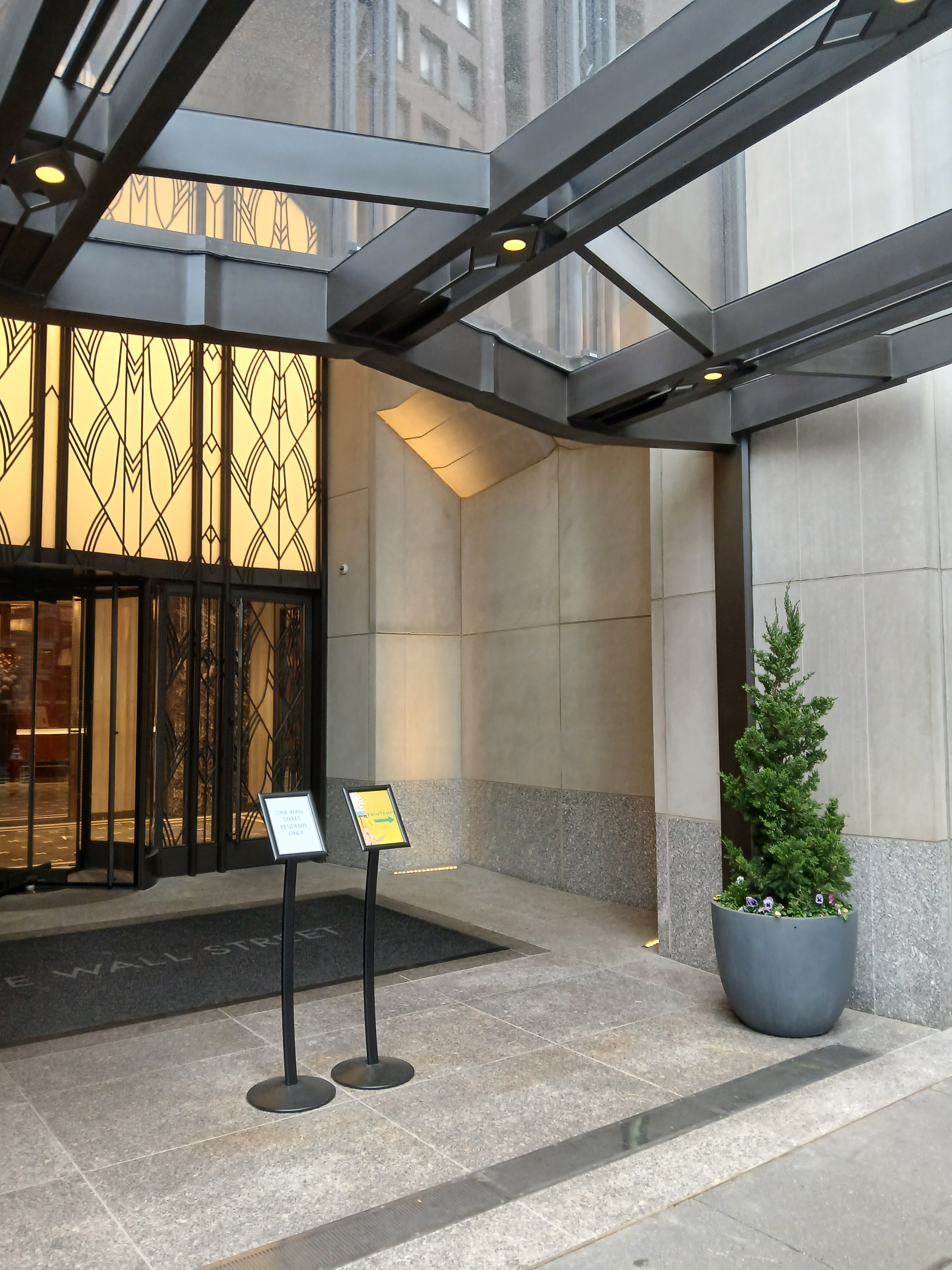
Resident-only entrance in the annex

The southern annex, completed in 1965, is also mostly made of limestone. On the New Street side, there are setbacks above the 5th and 10th floors; the building then rises as a slender slab with setbacks on the 29th, 34th, and 35th floors. Along Broadway, the facade of the annex was originally recessed behind that of the original building by two bays.

In 2018, a glass-clad entrance to the retail space was constructed in front of the annex. The entrance structure ranges between one and seven stories high. The facade of the 2018 addition projects forward to the facade of the original structure. Eight stories were also built atop the initial portion of the annex. In total, according to zoning documents, the annex measures 180 feet (55 m) on Broadway and 132.5 feet (40.4 m) on Exchange Place.

=== Features ===
External videos
- Tour an Art Deco Masterpiece, The Daily 360 , The New York Times

The building contains 10 elevators as of 2019, compared with 43 elevators and 14 escalators prior to the building's residential conversion. When built, 1 Wall Street had 29 elevators, some of which were near the building's exterior walls. Irving Trust had six private elevators accessed from Wall Street. There were three groups of elevators in the rest of the building, serving the lower, intermediate, or upper floors; these elevators could be reached from Broadway, New Street, or the subway. Because the New Street side of the building was lower than the Broadway side, engineers configured the original elevator shafts so that double-deck elevators could be installed if necessary, but these double-deck elevators were never built. At its completion, 1 Wall Street was the first office structure in Lower Manhattan to use alternating current for electric power. It included a network of pneumatic tubes for sending documents between floors. When 1 Wall Street was converted to residential use, all of the elevators were moved to the center of the building.

There is 1,165,645 sq ft (108,292 m^{2}) of interior space, of which the original building had 500,000 square feet (46,000 m^{2}) of floor space. The original building's first through 21st stories each spanned 15,000 square feet (1,400 m^{2}). There are also five basement levels under the original structure, three of which are below sea level. A corridor inside 1 Wall Street's basement, stretching between Broadway and New Street, provided access to the northbound platform of the Wall Street station, but it had been converted to a communications room by 2000. Upon the building's opening, Irving Trust occupied the basements, lowest ten floors, and uppermost three floors. Following its residential conversion, 1 Wall Street contained 678,000 square feet (63,000 m^{2}) of residential space and 166,000 square feet (15,400 m^{2}) of commercial space. The top stories of the annex (completed in 2023) were largely built as voided slabs; hollow plastic spheres were embedded into the concrete floor slabs to reduce the slabs' weight. The glass retail addition is cantilevered outward from the original annex, avoiding the need to drill into the Wall Street subway station, which is located directly underneath the retail addition.

==== Red Room and lobby ====
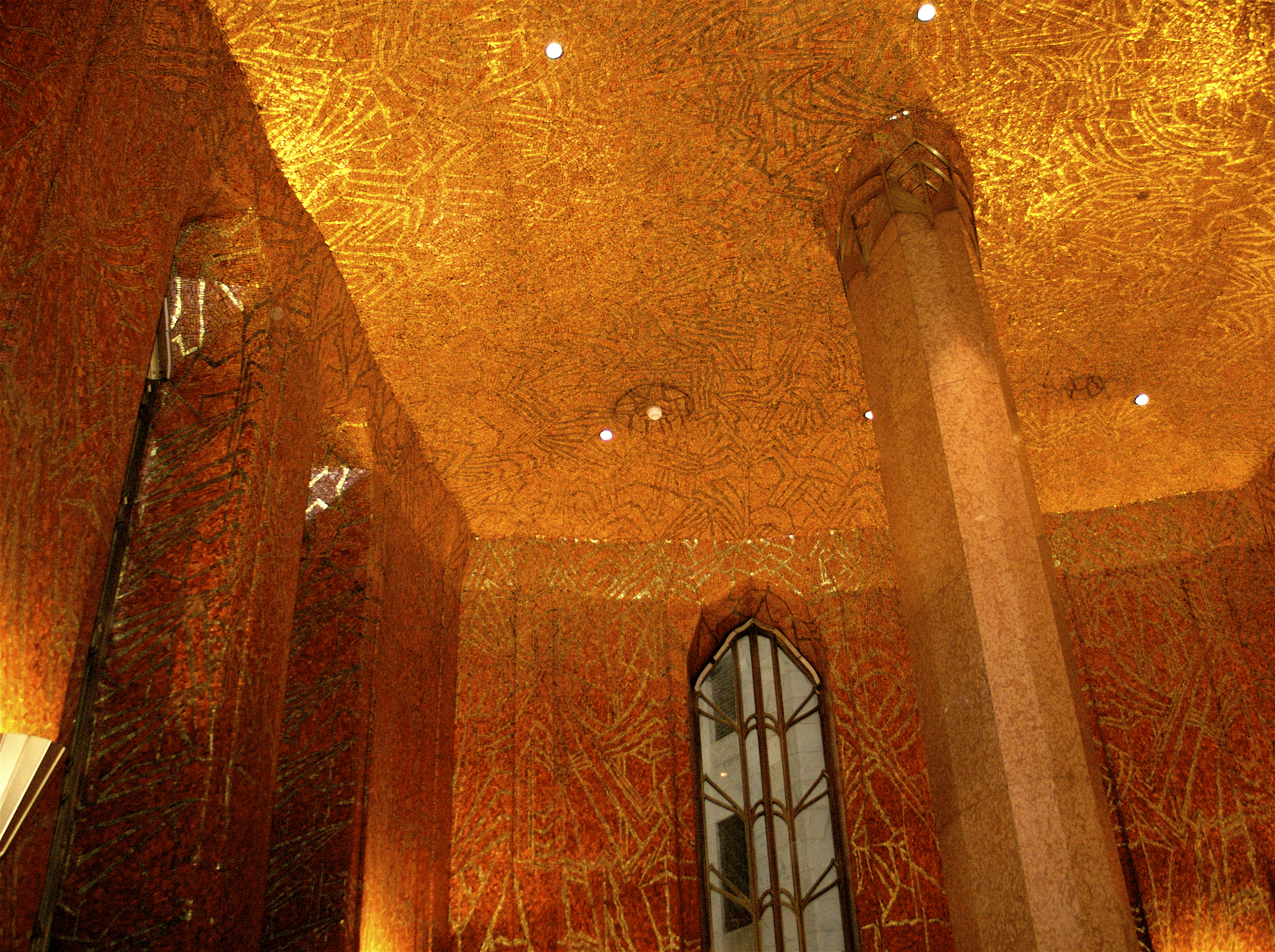
Interior of the Red Room

At ground level is the Red Room. Walker and his associate Perry Coke Smith designed the room, while artist Hildreth Meière was hired as a "color consultant". The space was intended mainly as a reception room for the bank and was accessed primarily from Wall Street to the north. The Red Room had no tellers' counters since Irving Trust was a commercial bank, rather than a savings bank. Lewis Pierson of Irving Trust described the Red Room as a place "where we shall meet our customers and friends". Unlike earlier banking rooms such as those in the Williamsburgh Savings Bank Building and National City Bank Building, the Red Room did not contain classical-style decorations.

The Red Room measures 100 feet (30 m) long from west to east and 40 feet (12 m) wide from north to south. The ceiling is variously cited as measuring 30 feet (9.1 m), 33 feet (10 m), or 37 feet (11 m) high. The room is shaped like an oblong polygon, and there are few right angles within the space. On the north wall is a bronze-clad entrance vestibule, while on the south wall are frosted double glass doors leading to the elevator foyer. There are arched windows on the eastern and western walls, as well as doors on the northern and southern walls. Each of the windows to the east and west has a deep sill, and there are also lancet windows on either side of the entrance to the north. There are radiators with ornate bronze grilles beneath each window. When Irving Trust occupied the building, the Red Room had some chairs and desks. The brokers' loan officers had desks next to the eastern wall, while the officers of Irving Trust's city office sat at desks near the western wall.

Because the building was completed just after the Wall Street Crash of 1929, the Red Room's design included ornate materials to attract customers. The floor is made of red terrazzo tiles. Walker and Smith personally supervised the creation of the floor tiles in Berlin. The walls and ceilings are decorated with 8,911 square feet (827.9 m^{2}) or 13,000 square feet (1,200 m^{2}) of mosaics, which were designed by Meière and manufactured by the Ravenna Mosaic Company in Long Island City and Berlin. The color scheme of the mosaic ranges from red-on-blue on the walls to gold-on-black on the ceiling. The tiles gradually become lighter on the upper portions of the walls, drawing visitors' attention toward the ceiling. The mosaic also contains abstract gold patterns. The rest of the walls is made of Pyrenees black marble, and the columns are made of Verona red marble, similar to a design used in the Stockholm City Hall. The two columns are placed on an east-west axis and have bronze capitals. At the northern and southern ends of the room, the ceiling slants slightly upward.

South of the entrance is a foyer that runs between Broadway and New Street, with two polygonal piers. The foyer in turn connected directly to the building's elevators. The Broadway and New Street lobby had walls made of Pyrenees black marble. The ceiling also had an allegorical painting measuring 20 by 66 feet (6.1 by 20.1 m), depicting the influence of wealth on the creation of beauty. Meière and Kimon Nicolaïdes designed the painting. When the annex was built, the expanded lobby floor was clad in travertine, and the original lobby's ceiling was covered with a dropped ceiling.

==== Upper floors ====
As with other early-20th-century skyscrapers in the Financial District, the lower stories had large floor areas for the building's primary tenant, Irving Trust, while the upper stories were smaller. The lowest 21 floors each spanned about 15,000 square feet (1,400 m^{2}). Irving Trust occupied the first ten stories, using their large floor areas to house its clerical staff. The second floor originally contained Irving Trust's Wall Street office, which served businesses in the Financial District. The third floor was for the bank's corporate and personal trust divisions. The fifth floor had the bank's executive offices, wainscoted with wood from around the world, while the sixth floor accommodated the out-of-town and foreign divisions and a telephone room for long-distance calls.

The 10th through 45th floors were rented to outside tenants. Voorhees, Gmelin & Walker were not responsible for the layout of the offices, instead hiring specialists for that task. Architectural firms also designed some of the offices; for example, the Fiduciary Trust Company's 30th-story offices were designed by Delano and Aldrich, while the offices on the 31st story were designed by Cross & Cross. Generally, law firms and financial firms leased entire stories for themselves. These included brokerage house Bear Stearns, which hired H. J. Horvath & Company and designer W. A. Zwicke to subdivide its 10th-floor space into various offices and other rooms.

Irving Trust's dining room was on the 46th floor. The directors' room, on the 47th floor, was decorated with 18-foot-high (5.5 m) wooden wainscoting, and there were directors' chairs arranged in a semicircle. The stories above it had dining spaces and a three-story observation lounge; these spaces had Art Deco furnishings. The executive lounge, at the 49th story, had a ceiling made of gold-leaf seashells, as well as walls covered with multicolored patterned fabrics. The executive lounge also had a triple-height ceiling, fluted walls, teak floors, and a fireplace, as well as four full-height windows that faced each of the cardinal directions. The walls were also decorated with depictions of Native American war bonnets.

Following 1 Wall Street's 2020s residential conversion, there have been 566 condominium apartments, of which 304 are studios and one-bedroom units. Forty-seven of the condominiums have private decks. The condominiums were designed by SLCE Architects. The upper three floors were converted into a three-story penthouse apartment with 12,965 square feet (1,204.5 m^{2}), four bedrooms and four bathrooms, as well as a private library and chef's kitchen. Several of the units are model apartments, which are shown to prospective buyers and were designed by FrenchCalifornia, Elizabeth Graziolo, and Cyril Vergniol. The amenities include a 75-foot (23 m) indoor swimming pool, 39th-floor observation deck, library, golf simulator, dog spa, and playroom, as well as a lounge and a private restaurant. The restaurant includes a 4,500-square-foot (420 m^{2}) terrace facing New York Harbor to the south. The building also contains communal spaces with kitchens, phone booths, AV equipment, and printers. These amenities are mostly clustered in the annex, occupying the 38th and 39th floors. Life Time operates an athletic club within the building, and there is also a coworking space known as One Works.

==== Vault ====
Irving Trust's bank vault, weighing 5,000 short tons (4,500 long tons; 4,500 t), was located 69 to 72 feet (21 to 22 m) below ground level. At the time of the building's 1931 completion, the vault was the second-largest in the city and third-largest in the world, behind those of the Federal Reserve Bank of New York Building and the Bank of England. The vault was encased on three sides by a 6-foot-thick (1.8 m) wall composed of iron, steel, and concrete; the fourth side was composed of 3 feet (0.91 m) of concrete and a thick layer of metal.

The vault had three stories, of which the top level was used by safe-deposit customers, and the lower floors stored Irving Trust's own fortunes. Each story had 2,700 square feet (250 m^{2}) of space. There were six vault doors, each measuring 30 inches (760 mm) thick; the doors were laced with chemicals that reportedly emitted "paralyzing fumes" if a robber tried to open the door using a blowtorch. The two main doors on the upper level, and one door on each of the other levels, weighed 45 short tons (40 long tons; 41 t) each. A tank of water, as well as chemical, electrical, and mechanical systems, were used to deter break-ins.

== History ==
=== Previous structures ===
==== Northern portion ====
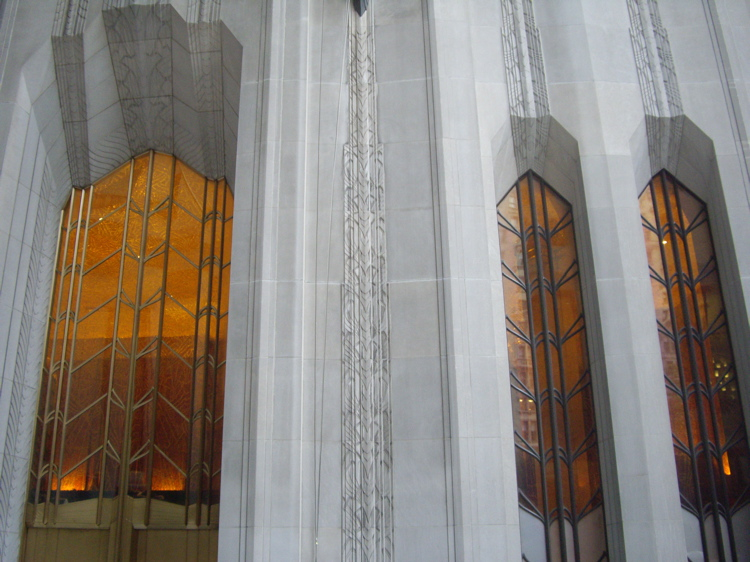
The windows at 1 Wall Street

Since the settlement of New Amsterdam in the 17th century, only three buildings on the northern portion of the current skyscraper's site had carried the address 1 Wall Street. The first was a 17th-century stone house, and the second was built in the 19th century. The third such structure was an 18-story office building built in 1907 and designed by St. Louis-based firm Barnett, Haynes & Barnett. The structure was known as the "Chimney Building" or the "'chimney corner' building", and its footprint measured only 29 by 39 feet (8.8 by 11.9 m). The Chimney Building was developed by a syndicate from St. Louis, headed by Festus Wade of the St. Louis Mercantile Trust Company. In mid-1905, the company paid $700,000 (Note: About $18,889,000 in 2024) for the 1,131-square-foot (105.1 m^{2}) plot, or an average of $576 per square foot ($6,200/m^{2}). (Note: About $15,543 per square foot ($167,300/m^{2}) in 2024) The next year, the syndicate announced that it would start erecting an 18-story structure at 1 Wall Street. The Chimney Building was completed in 1907, and for years afterward, its site was the world's most valuable.

Adjoining the Chimney Building were between three and five other structures, ranging from approximately 10 to 20 stories high. The oldest of these was the Union Trust Building, which was erected in 1889 and had 8-foot-thick (2.4 m) masonry walls because engineers of the time did not know how much steel the building required. One of the twelve-story structures surrounded the Chimney Building, and in 1926, this structure and the Chimney Building were sold to a syndicate of bankers. The writer Washington Irving, the namesake of the Irving Trust Company, had occupied a house at 3 Wall Street several years before the building's development.

==== Southern portion ====
The southern half of the block had two structures: the Manhattan Life Insurance Building on the north and the Knickerbocker Trust Company Building to the south. The 18-story Manhattan Life Building, completed in 1894, was in the middle of the block, at 64 Broadway. That structure was slightly extended north in 1904 to encompass all lots between 64 and 70 Broadway.

The Knickerbocker Trust Company bought the land immediately south of the Manhattan Life Building in early 1906, and finalized building plans the next year. The 22-story Knickerbocker Trust building at 60 Broadway was completed in 1909 and contained a ground-floor banking room, a private penthouse restaurant, and eight elevators. There was a 23-foot-wide (7.0 m) space between the Manhattan Life and Knickerbocker Trust buildings. A 10-inch (0.3 m) strip of land on the northern side of the gap was sold to John E. Schermerhorn in 1912. The Schermerhorn family subsequently built an eight-story taxpayer building at 62 Broadway, within the 23-foot-10-inch-wide (7.3 m) gap.

=== Development ===
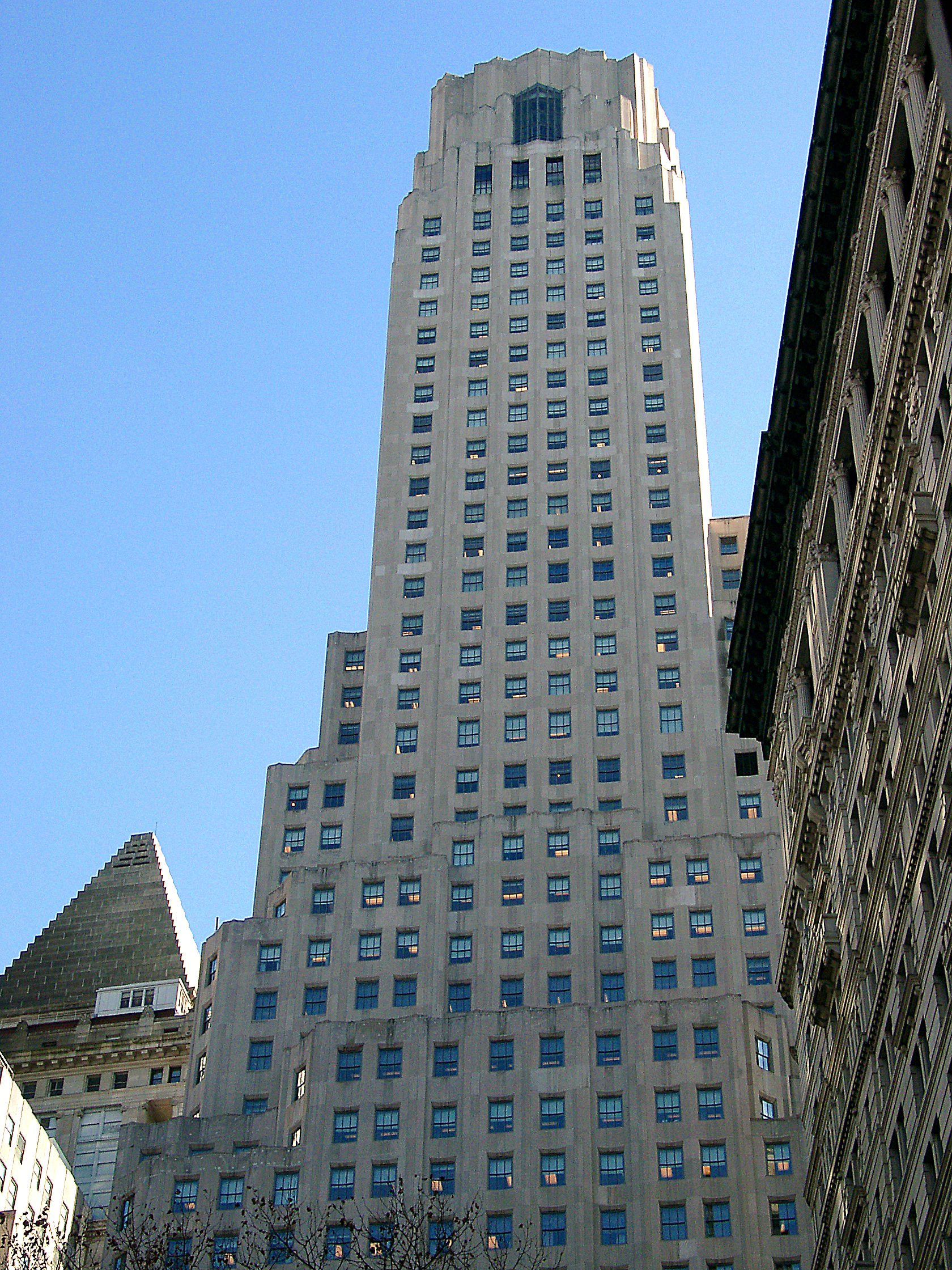
The western facade from Rector Street

The idea for the current skyscraper was attributed to Irving Trust president Harry Ward. Since its founding in 1851, Irving Trust had merged with numerous other banks in preceding years, and the firm had outgrown its offices, which were split between 60 Broadway, the Equitable Building, and the Woolworth Building. When the building was proposed, the bank was known as American Exchange Irving Trust, having merged in 1926 with the American Exchange-Pacific National Bank. During the mid- and late-1920s, many Art Deco office buildings were constructed in New York City, peaking around 1929 and 1930. Additionally, banks in Manhattan were clustering around Wall Street, and the corner of Broadway and Wall Street was seen as a valuable location.

==== Planning ====
By April 1928, the Central Union Trust Company controlled the buildings from 64 to 80 Broadway, and reportedly planned to build a 36-story structure at the site of the Chimney Building. The following month, American Exchange Irving Trust bought the Chimney Building along with three adjacent structures at 7 Wall Street, and 74 and 80 Broadway, in exchange for $5.5 million in cash and a $9 million mortgage. (Note: The cash amount is about $79.1 million, and the mortgage about $129.5 million, in 2024) The transaction cost approximately $725 per square foot ($7,800/m^{2}). (Note: Equivalent to about $10,433 per square foot ($112,300/m^{2}) in 2024) Following the sale, the Central Union Trust Company moved to the Manhattan Life Building and modified the structures at 60, 62, and 70 Broadway.

Immediately after the purchase, Irving Trust announced it would erect an office building on the site. This announcement occurred amid an increase in the number of large banks in New York City. The company's board of directors founded a sub-committee for construction oversight, and several Irving Trust employees formed the One Wall Street Unit to coordinate logistical planning for the new skyscraper. Thirty-five potential architects were identified and interviewed extensively. Ultimately, in June 1928, Voorhees, Gmelin and Walker were hired to design the structure, and Marc Eidlitz was hired as builder. Voorhees, Gmelin and Walker filed plans with the Manhattan Bureau of Buildings the next month. The initial plans, known as Scheme B1, called for a 46- or 52-story building on a plot of 178 by 101 feet (54 by 31 m); they called for two banking rooms at ground level. Walker and his associate Perry Coke Smith designed a large banking room called the Red Room for the lower stories, and Walker hired Hildreth Meière to design the mosaics for the Red Room. Smith and Meière collaborated on the Red Room's color scheme, while Lynn Fausett helped draw out the designs for the room.

An August 1928 memorandum between the architects and Irving Trust prompted several changes to the plans. Among those were separate elevators for bank employees and rental tenants; the removal of retail spaces and luncheon clubs; and the addition of a common reception lobby. In October 1928, local newspapers reported that Irving Trust had accepted "final plans" for a 44-story building rising 560 feet (170 m). This design resembled the current structure, with setbacks and a curving facade. The actual final plans, filed in June 1929, provided for a 50-story structure. The 1929 plans were released after Irving Trust applied for, and received, a zoning variance that allowed the base's first setback to be higher than would normally be allowed. The variance also allowed for a shallower setback, and the tower was allowed to cover more than 25 percent of the lot, the maximum lot coverage ratio typically allowed under the 1916 Zoning Resolution.

==== Construction ====
Construction on the site of 1 Wall Street began in May 1929, with the demolition of the four buildings on the northern portion of the site. Several engineering professors from Columbia University were hired as consultants for the demolition process. Work was complicated by the fact that one of the previous buildings on the site had extremely sturdy walls ranging from 4 to 10 feet (1.2 to 3.0 m) thick. Excavations began in July 1929, and work on the building itself began that August. During December 1929, Ward sent engraved letters to 500 nearby property owners, apologizing for the noise created during the riveting process; this generated positive publicity for the building in both the local and national press.

The ceremonial cornerstone was laid on January 15, 1930. During the construction process, nearby structures such as Trinity Church were shored up. That March, Irving Trust signed an agreement with the Interborough Rapid Transit Company—at the time, one of the operators of the city's subway system—to build three new entrances to the Wall Street station on Broadway and another entrance in 1 Wall Street's basement. The frame involved the installation of 250,000 rivets and was completed in four months of the cornerstone-laying, without any serious incidents. The Ravenna Mosaic Company was hired to manufacture mosaics for the Red Room, and six workers from a mosaic-tile labor union helped Ravenna's workers install the mosaics.

When the steel frame topped out on May 12, 1930, workers hoisted an evergreen tree to the top of the frame. While the workers were securing the final rivets, a hot steel rivet fell from the building's top and hit a truck below, narrowly missing the truck driver's head and causing a small fire on the street. The Indiana Limestone Company was hired to supply the building's Indiana limestone. Several hundred boxcars were used to transport the building's Indiana limestone to New York City; (Note: The Brooklyn Citizen quotes the builders as saying 288 boxcars had been used. However, the New York Herald Tribune and the New York City Landmarks Preservation Commission state that over 400 boxcars were used.) according to railroad workers, it was the largest-ever such order. Before being used in the building, the limestone blocks went to a workshop in Long Island City, where they were carved to meet the building's specifications. The exterior was completed by August 1930.

=== Irving Trust use ===
By December 1930, Irving Trust announced that 80 percent of the space had been leased in the nearly-completed building. Tenants started moving into 1 Wall Street by mid-March 1931, before its formal opening, at which point it was 85 percent occupied. Among the tenants were several members of the New York Stock Exchange and Curb Exchange. The Irving Trust Company moved into the building on March 23, 1931. Two hundred guards armed with machine guns moved the bank's $8 billion holdings (Note: About $132.4 billion in 2024) from its former location at the Woolworth Building. The same day, 1 Wall Street opened to public use, with thousands of visitors. By that time, the building was 90 percent occupied. Shortly afterward, the Fiduciary Trust Company of New York moved its banking quarters to the 30th floor, making that space the highest banking quarters in New York City. In a 1938 incident, an electrical transformer on the 21st-story setback blew up; though the windows shook, nobody was injured. An air-conditioning system was installed at 1 Wall Street in 1953, which was one of the largest air-conditioning retrofits ever undertaken in the New York City area at the time.

The original building soon became too small to accommodate the operations of Irving Trust and its tenants. Accordingly, in 1961, Irving Trust purchased the three buildings at 60, 62, and 70 Broadway from Hanover Bank, thereby giving Irving Trust control of the entire block between Broadway, Wall Street, New Street, and Exchange Place. The company initially anticipated that the annex would cost $25 million. (Note: About 200 million in 2024) Voorhees, Walker, Smith, Smith & Haines were hired to design the annex, while Turner Construction was hired as the main contractor. By mid-1963, the site had been cleared. In advance of the upcoming renovation, Irving Trust subleased space at 2 Broadway. To finance construction, Irving Trust sold the building to a subsidiary, which then sold $30 million of secured notes to investors. (Note: About 240 million in 2024) Renovations also took place in the original building; tenants continued to use 1 Wall Street during construction, but the vault in the basement was emptied. A refrigeration plant was installed on the annex's roof to provide air-conditioning to both parts of the building, and cooling machinery was also installed in the basement. The project was finished by late 1965.

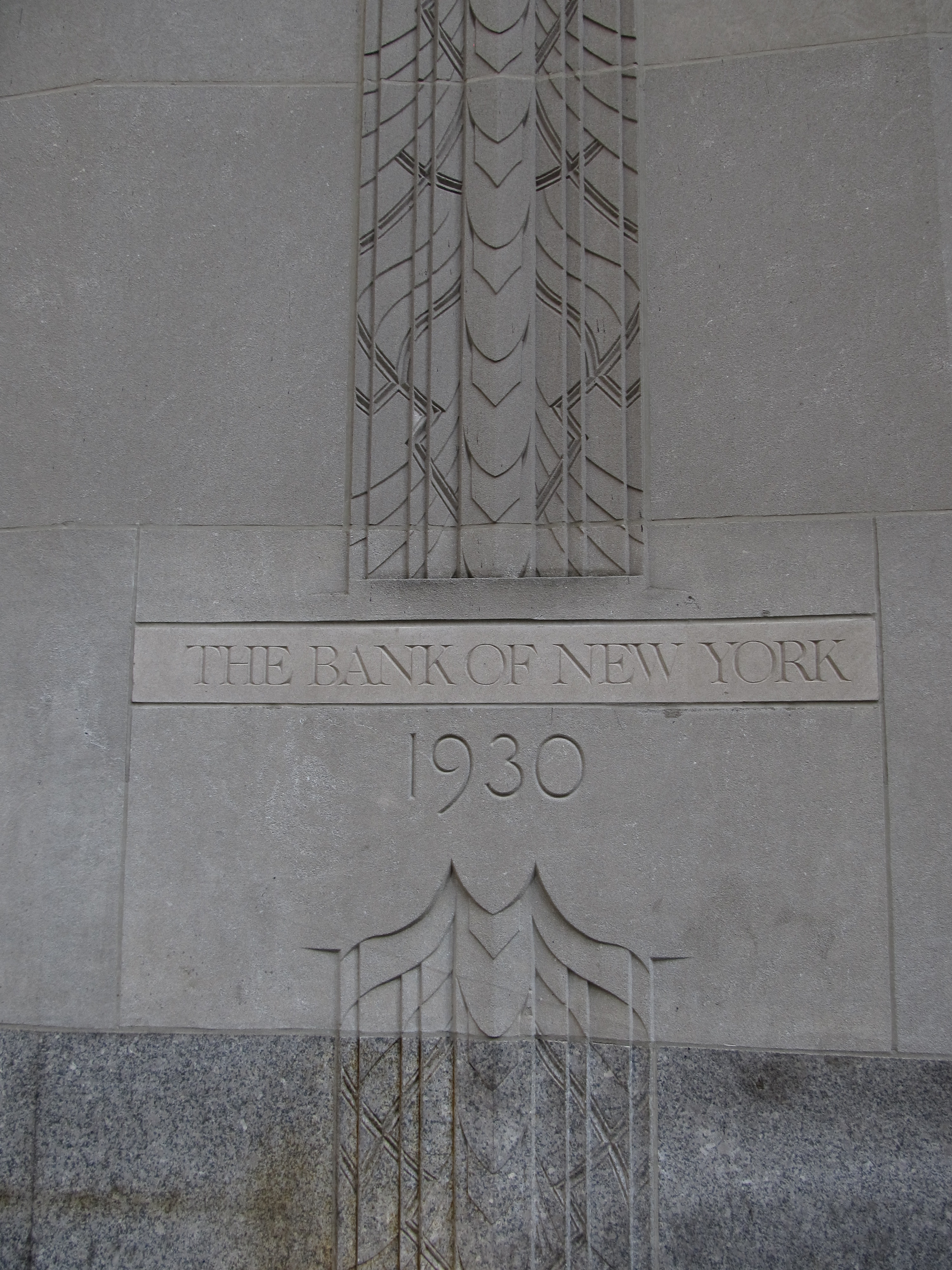
Cornerstone, modified to contain the words "The Bank of New York"

By 1980, Irving Trust had decided to relocate its operations center to another building near the World Trade Center. Between 1987 and 1988, Irving Trust was negotiating to merge with the Bank of New York (BNY), which at the time was headquartered nearby at 48 Wall Street. Irving Trust initially rejected buy-out offers from BNY because the latter had "undervalued" Irving Trust's assets such as 1 Wall Street. By October 1988, with a merger imminent, Irving Trust placed 1 Wall Street for auction; at the time, the building was valued at $250 million. (Note: About 570 million in 2024) BNY acquired Irving Trust in December 1988. BNY decided to sell its old headquarters at 48 Wall Street and relocate its headquarters to 1 Wall Street.

BNY (renamed BNY Mellon in 2007) opened a museum on the 10th floor in 1998, which was dedicated to the history of both banks. During the same time, BNY hired Hoffmann Architects to conduct mortar repair and window replacements. While 1 Wall Street was not damaged following the September 11 attacks at the nearby World Trade Center in 2001, BNY's operations were disrupted, and 1 Wall Street had to be cleaned up.

=== Sale and conversion ===
By January 2014, BNY Mellon was looking to sell its headquarters, as it was moving to a location with less space. In May 2014, BNY Mellon sold the building to a joint venture led by Harry B. Macklowe's Macklowe Properties for $585 million, though BNY Mellon continued to occupy the building until September 2015. Macklowe wanted to add up to 174,000 square feet (16,200 m^{2}) of retail space at the base.

==== Renovation ====
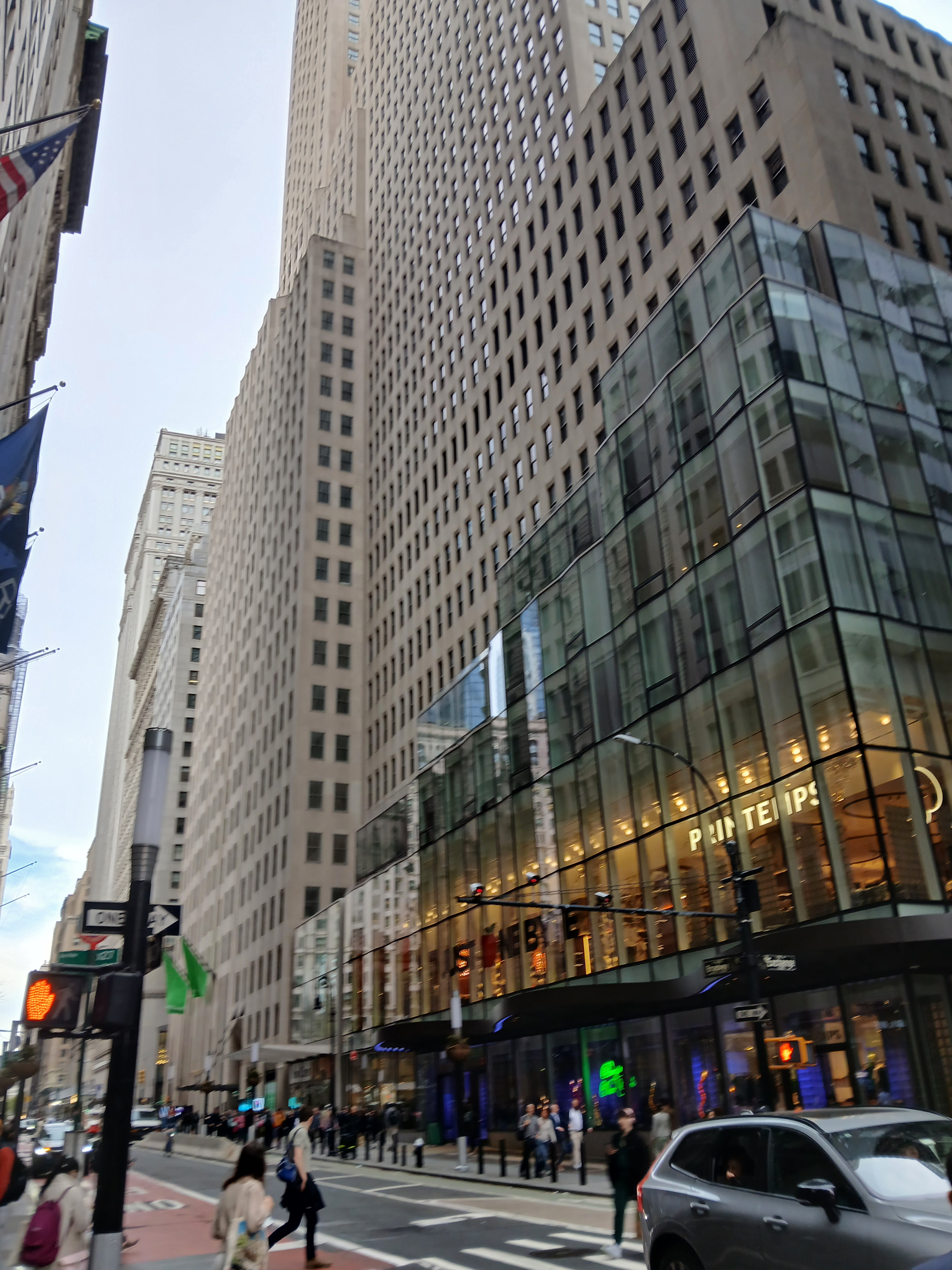
1 Wall Street with its glass addition

Macklowe initially planned to make 1 Wall Street a mixed-use residential and office building, and he wanted to rent out 65 percent of the residences. In early 2017, Macklowe announced that the building would be almost entirely residential condominiums, since an all-residential building, owned by its tenants, would require less debt. Macklowe Properties partnered with former Prime Minister of Qatar Hamad bin Jassim bin Jaber Al Thani in a bid to convert the office property into 566 condos with retail at the base. The renovation was originally supposed to be designed by Robert A.M. Stern Architects, who were replaced by SLCE Architects. Ashe Leandro, Deborah Berke Partners, and Moed de Armas and Shannon also redesigned parts of the building, and Deutsche Bank provided a $750 million mortgage loan for the conversion. At the time, the project was the largest conversion of office space to residential space in New York City, covering nearly 1.2 million square feet (110,000 m^{2}).

As part of the renovation, 34 elevators and 16 escalators were removed. The original layout of the building included elevators near the perimeter wall, but this took up usable space near windows. As such, Macklowe removed 20 of the elevators that served upper floors and added 10 new elevators in the building core; new stairs were also constructed to replace the existing stairs. The demolition of the interior was completed in November 2018. The Red Room was restored between 2016 and 2018, in advance of its conversion into a retail space. The Red Room's restoration used tiles that had been placed in storage and unused when the building was originally erected. The facade was restored using stone from the quarry that had supplied the material for Walker's original building. Eight stories were added to the southern annex, and the third floor was demolished to make a higher ceiling for the retail space. A new entrance was also constructed on Broadway, with a design based on one of Walker's unrealized plans for the building.

Whole Foods Market leased a 44,000-square-foot (4,100 m^{2}) storefront in 2016, and Life Time Fitness signed a 74,000-square-foot (6,900 m^{2}) lease for a gym on the lowest four floors in 2019. Macklowe originally hired Core Real Estate to market the apartments. However, he replaced Core with Compass, Inc., in December 2020, prompting Core to sue Macklowe for unpaid brokerage fees. Sales of residential units were launched in September 2021. By March 2022, Macklowe and Al Thani planned to refinance 1 Wall Street for $1.1 billion, using the proceeds to pay off construction costs and outstanding debt. At that point, the renovation was projected to be completed by the end of 2022.

==== Post-renovation and sales struggles ====
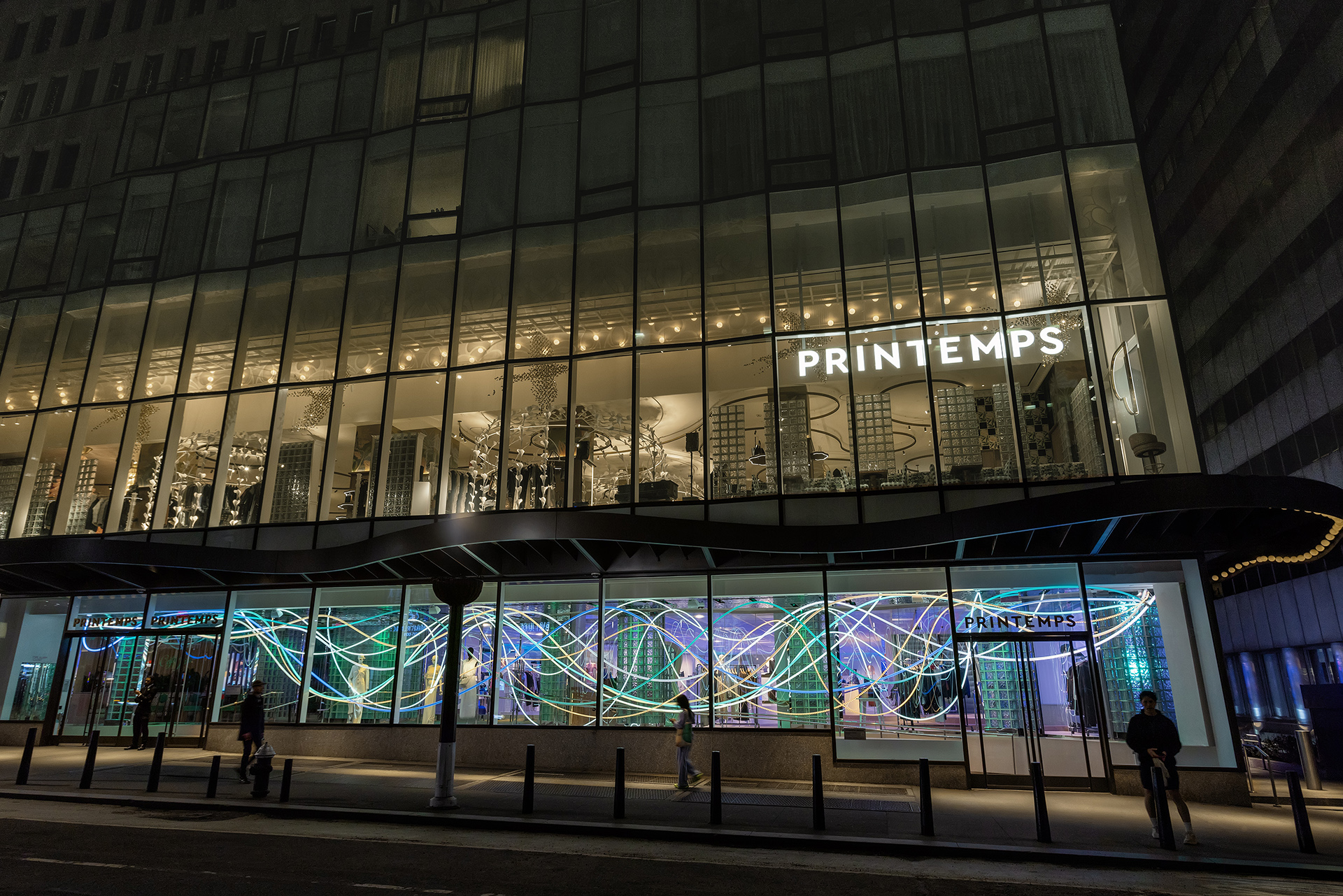
Printemps storefront, featuring a light installation from Grimanesa Amorós.

French department store Printemps announced in September 2022 that it would open a store at 1 Wall Street, citing the presence of several cultural centers in the Financial District. The store was to cover 55,000 square feet (5,100 m^{2}) on two floors, including a shoe salon in the Red Room, as well as a bar and a restaurant. The architect Laura Gonzalez redesigned some of the ground-floor spaces for Printemps. The Whole Foods Market at the building's base opened in January 2023. The first residents were scheduled to move into the building that March, and construction was officially completed that month. When the renovation was completed, 1 Wall Street's owners wanted to operate a bar there, but the building was across the street from Trinity Church, and state law prevented bars from operating within 200 feet (61 m) of a house of worship. As a result, the New York State Legislature granted a waiver to allow the bar to open. The Printemps store ultimately opened in March 2025.

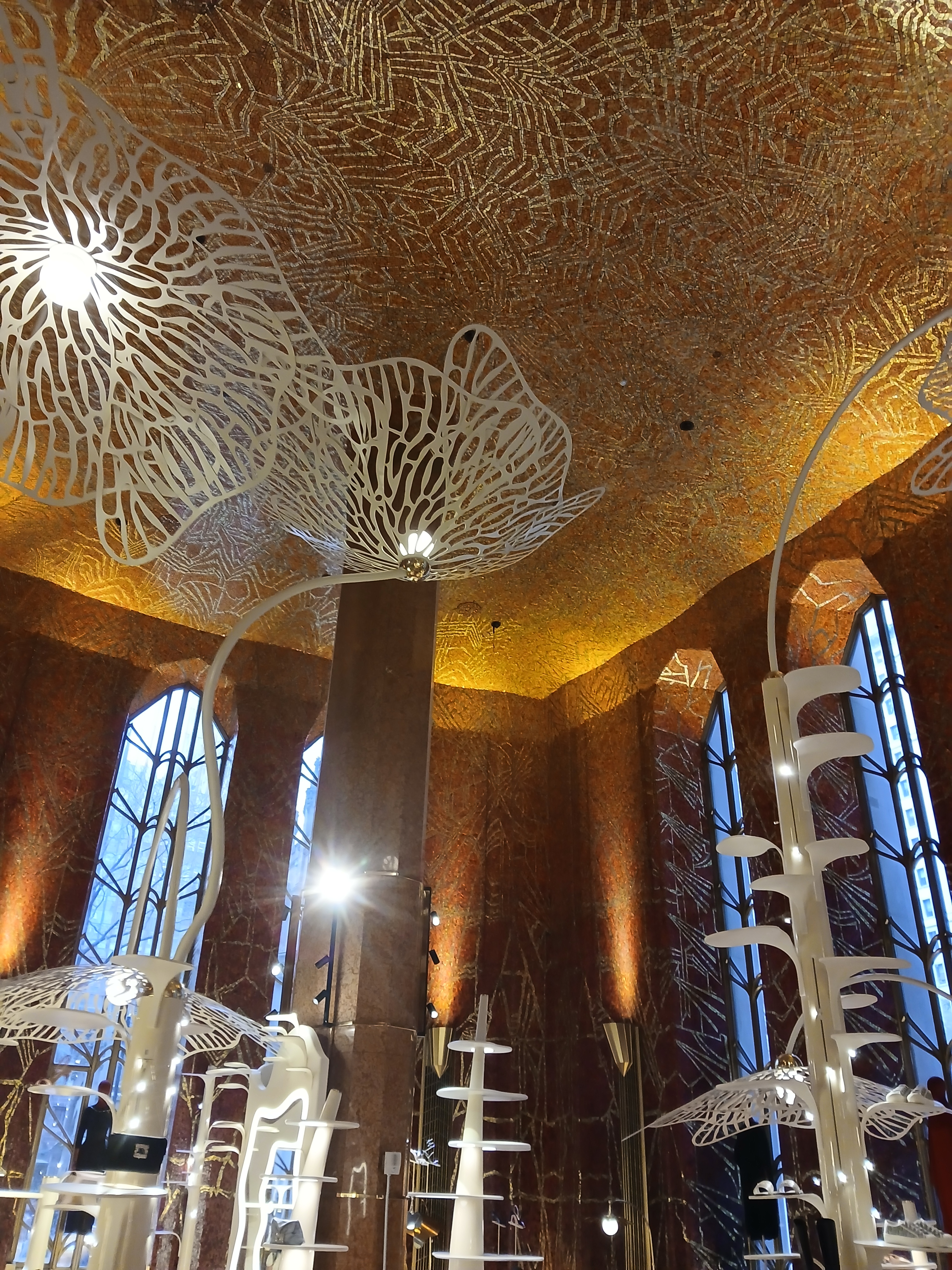
The Red Room after the opening of the Printemps store

Meanwhile, Macklowe received a $300 million inventory loan for the building in October 2023 after sales underperformed expectations. At the time, there were 479 unsold units out of 566 total apartments, and the project had cost $2.9 billion to date. Sales remained lower than expected; by February 2024, only about 100 apartments had been sold. Asian investors comprised about half of the condominium owners by that year, but such sales were slowing down due to new foreign exchange controls in China. Industry experts cited two other reasons for the lagging sales: Condos were overpriced compared to similar units nearby, and there was a general oversupply of vacant residential units in the Financial District.Macklowe replaced the sales agents from Compass, Inc., in May 2024 with two brokers from Macklowe Properties. By November 2024, the New York Post said sales of 1 Wall Street condominiums had been "a bust", noting Macklowe had closed on only 112 of the 566 units after four years of sales. The total sales amount of $230 million represented just 14% of Macklowe's projected $1.7 billion sellout, not including a triplex penthouse which had not yet been marketed. A majority of the sales were identified through official Automated City Register Information System records to have been bought by Asian and Russian buyers, primarily as investment properties with many of the sold units back on the market for rent.

== Impact ==
=== Reception ===
1 Wall Street received an accolade from the Broadway Association in 1931; the association designated the building as the "most worthy of civic endorsement" out of all structures erected around Broadway in 1930. A writer for the New York Evening Post called Meière's lobby mural "one of the most costly and beautiful pieces of mural decoration ever attempted in the United States". Eugene Clute of Metal Arts magazine described the walls as "a rich, free-hanging fabric" and "a cage set within the frame of the building and finished with a lining that has no more structural significance than the lining of my lady's work basket".

Architectural critics of the mid-20th century generally ignored the building in favor of more widely renowned structures, such as the Empire State Building, the Chrysler Building, and 40 Wall Street. Architectural reviewer Lewis Mumford criticized 1 Wall Street's facade for not accurately representing its internal design, saying: "Chaste though that exterior is, it is mere swank, and unconvincing swank at that". Because of Irving Trust's role as a receiver for bankrupt companies, 1 Wall Street was called the "Central Repair Shop for Broken Businesses". Architectural historian Robert A. M. Stern wrote in his 1987 book New York 1930 that 1 Wall Street's proximity to other skyscrapers including 70 Pine Street, 20 Exchange Place, 40 Wall Street, and the Downtown Athletic Club had reduced older skyscrapers "to the status of foothills in a new mountain range". Daniel Abramson wrote in 2001 that the "corner and tower treatments appear blocky and conventional" compared to 70 Pine Street, though 1 Wall Street was still distinguished in its massing and the curves in its facade.

Later architectural critics also praised the structure. Ada Louise Huxtable of The New York Times wrote in 1975 that 1 Wall Street was an "Art Deco masterpiece". In a 2001 analysis, the Times characterized the Empire State Building, the Chrysler Building, and 1 Wall Street as three great Art Deco buildings in New York City. Stern stated that in 1 Wall Street's design, "structure became an unseen prop for poetry"; he further called the building's form "a natural precipice of stone shaped by erosion". Architectural writer Eric P. Nash called 1 Wall Street "one of the most delicate, even feminine, skyscrapers ever built". After the building's residential conversion was completed in 2023, a Daily Beast reporter wrote that the structure's conversion could be a model for other office-to-residence conversions. Adriane Quinlan of Curbed contrasted the building with Macklowe's ultra-luxury tower at 432 Park Avenue, calling 1 Wall Street "Macklowe's tower for the working, rather than the obscenely, rich". Ian Volner, writing for Curbed in 2024, described the Red Room as "an over-the-top dream of period pizzazz that makes Baz Luhrmann's Gatsby look like a work of sober realism".

=== Landmark designations ===
In 2001, the New York City Landmarks Preservation Commission (LPC) designated the original portion of 1 Wall Street as an official city landmark. The designation only included the exterior of the original building and did not extend to the southern annex. The Red Room's interior was not given a separate interior-landmark designation because such designations at the time were reserved for publicly accessible spaces. Since the Red Room could only be used by BNY Mellon workers at the time of the exterior designation, the LPC considered it to be closed to the public. The LPC agreed in December 2023 to hold hearings on whether to designate the Red Room's interior as a landmark, and the Red Room was designated as an interior landmark on June 25, 2024.

As a result of the exterior landmark designation's limited scope, most of the modifications made during the 2010s condominium conversion, such as the glass retail addition, were made to the annex. Changes to designated landmarks required the commission's approval, but the annex was out of the commission's scope. In 2007, the building was designated as a contributing property to the Wall Street Historic District, a National Register of Historic Places district.

== See also ==
- Art Deco architecture of New York City
- List of buildings and structures on Broadway in Manhattan
- List of tallest buildings in New York City
- List of New York City Designated Landmarks in Manhattan below 14th Street
