= Clarke Brothers Bank =

- Company type: Bank
- Defunct: June 1929
- Fate: Bankruptcy
- Headquarters: Manhattan, New York

Clarke Brothers Bank was a Manhattan, New York based financial institution located at 154 Nassau Street that failed in June 1929. Park Row Trust Company, which opened in March 1930, was located on the same site as Clarke Brothers Bank. Four members of the bankrupt private bank were indicted for mail fraud in connection with the failure of the business. The bank's insolvency was initially figured at $5,000,000.

Directors of Irving Trust Company, which was appointed receiver when the bank passed into receivership, estimated the loss as $3,811,364. This was $1,200,000 less than the original figure.
