= Empire Building (Manhattan) =

Residential building in Manhattan, New York

- U.S. National Register of Historic Places
- U.S. Historic district – Contributing property
- New York State Register of Historic Places
- New York City Landmark
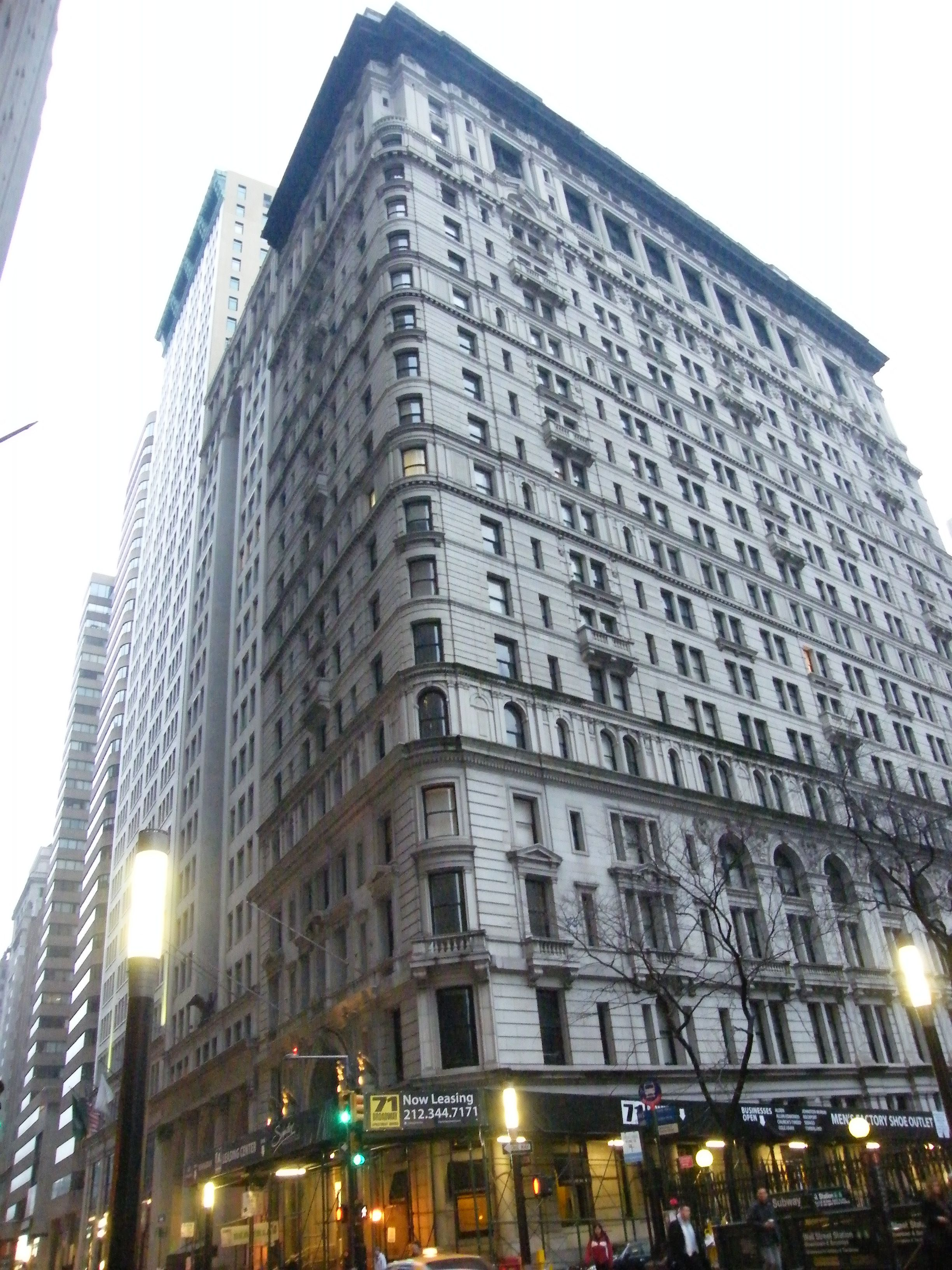
- The Empire Building in April 2009
- Location: 71 Broadway, Manhattan, New York
- Coordinates: 40°42′26″N 74°00′47″W
- Built: 1895–1898
- Architect: Kimball & Thompson
- Architectural style: Classical Revival
- Part of: Wall Street Historic District (ID07000063)
- NRHP reference No.: 83004643
- NYSRHP No.: 06101.006995
- NYCL No.: 1933

Significant dates
- Designated NRHP: August 28, 1998
- Designated CP: February 20, 2007
- Designated NYSRHP: December 22, 1982
- Designated NYCL: June 25, 1996

The Empire Building is an office building and early skyscraper at 71 Broadway, on the corner of Rector Street, in the Financial District of Manhattan in New York City. It was designed by Kimball & Thompson in the Classical Revival style and built by Marc Eidlitz & Son from 1897 to 1898. The building consists of 21 stories above a full basement story facing Trinity Place at the back of the building and is 293 feet (89 m) tall. The Empire Building is a New York City designated landmark and is listed on the National Register of Historic Places (NRHP). It is also a contributing property to the Wall Street Historic District, NRHP district created in 2007.

The Empire Building's articulation consists of three horizontal sections similar to the components of a column—namely a base, shaft, and capital—and has a facade of gray granite at its base and white granite on the upper stories. It is one of the earliest skyscrapers built on pneumatic caissons and one of the oldest such buildings that remain standing. The building contains an interior steel frame structure with a curtain-walled facade. The top stories contain a loggia on the facade as well as a large metal cornice above the 20th floor. There are numerous band courses, balconies, and arched windows along the facade.

The original Empire Building was a brownstone structure constructed in 1859. Though the politician and real estate developer Orlando B. Potter had acquired the brownstone in 1884, he died prior to the current building's construction. The present Empire Building was ultimately developed by his children as a 20-story structure. The Empire Building was the home of United States Steel Corporation from the company's 1901 founding to 1976, and U.S. Steel owned the building between 1919 and 1973. The Empire Building's 21st floor was constructed between 1928 and 1930 to designs by John C. Westervelt. The building was converted to apartments in 1997.

== Site ==
The plot measures 78 feet (24 m) along Broadway, 223 feet (68 m) along Rector Street, and 50 feet (15 m) on Trinity Place with a footprint of approximately 14,000 square feet (1,300 m^{2}). Because of modifications made to the building after its completion, some portions of the Broadway entrance cross over the lot line. The previous building on the site, a six-story brownstone structure, measured 82.6 feet (25.2 m) along Broadway, 223 feet (68 m) along Rector Street, and 52 feet (16 m) on Trinity Place.

Along Rector Street, it is adjacent to the churchyard of Trinity Church, providing a dramatic backdrop for the church and ensuring open views for the building. To the south is 65 Broadway, the former headquarters of the American Express company. There are entrances to New York City Subway stations right outside both of the Empire Building's principal facades: two stairs to the Wall Street station (4 and 5 trains) are located to either side of the building's main entrance, while an entrance to the Rector Street station (N, R, and W trains) is located on Trinity Place just outside the building entrance there.

== Architecture ==
The Empire Building was designed by the partnership of Kimball & Thompson, composed of Francis H. Kimball and George Kramer Thompson, in the Classical Revival style. It was built by Marc Eidlitz & Son, with Charles Sooysmith as foundation engineer. Though the building faces Broadway, with its main entrance on 71 Broadway, it also has entrances at 51-53 Trinity Place. The Empire Building has also been historically known as the U.S. Steel Company Building or O.B. Potter Trust Building, reflecting its past ownership.

As designed, the Empire Building was 20 stories, excluding the full basement on Trinity Place, but this was later expanded to 21 stories plus the basement. The total height of the building is 293 feet (89 m). The facade rises straight from street level and fills the entire lot except for two light courts on the south end of the lot. The offices were arranged so that they faced north toward Trinity Church, while utility rooms and elevators are located on the southern portion of the building.

=== Facade ===
The facades of the Empire Building are arranged in three sections, consisting of a four-story "base", a "shaft", and a four-story "capital" on top, similar to the components of a column. This was a common setup for facades of buildings that were being erected in the late 19th and early 20th centuries. The original design called for architectural terracotta sheathing, but the Potter family, which developed the Empire Building, switched to granite because they felt the material was "more suitable".

==== Base ====
The base is four stories of polished gray granite. Due to the difference in elevation between the front and the back of the building, the site slopes down from Broadway to Trinity Place, and there is a full-height storefront in the basement on Trinity Place.

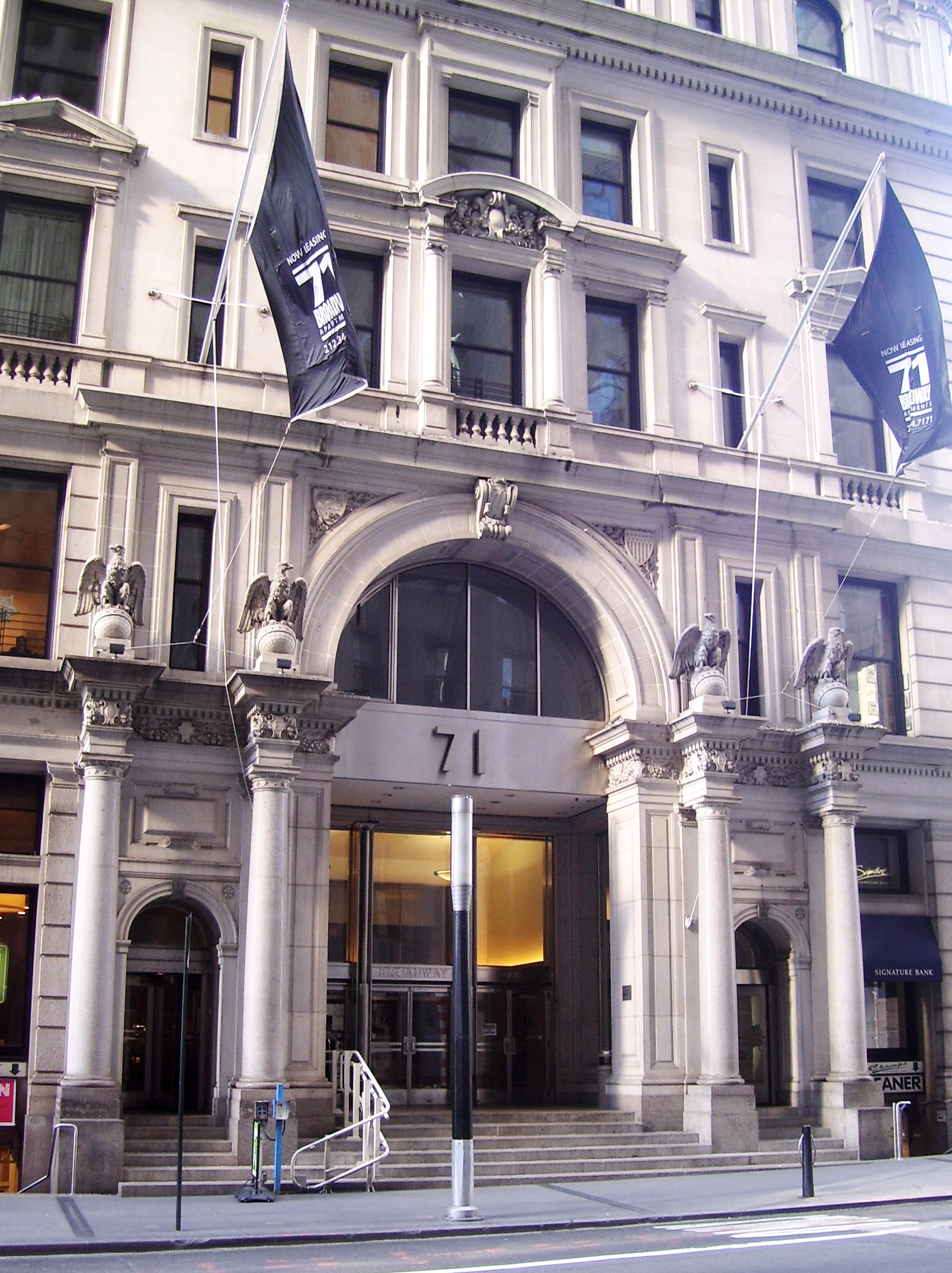
Main entrance arch

The main entrance on Broadway is based on a triumphal arch, with a main archway that contains three pairs of steel doors, and two smaller flanking ones that lead to first floor stores. The triumphal arch is flanked by two pairs of granite columns, topped by eagles on globes. The entrance originally consisted of three pairs of doors, leading to a portico with a barrel vault; it was modified by Walker & Gillette in 1937–1938 in the Art Deco style. The remodeled entrance has a stainless-steel transom band directly atop the doors with the stainless-steel text "71 Broadway 71", as well as a round-arched stainless-steel spandrel panel at the top of the arch, with the number "71" in stainless steel. Staircases to the Wall Street subway station flank the arches at the main entrance.

On the corner of Broadway and Rector Street, there is a chamfer that used to have an entrance at the first floor. Along Rector Street, the facade of the base is divided into three parts, and the full basement has storefronts. An entrance arch was located in the middle of the facade. On the third and fourth floors of the Rector Street facade, there is an arcade with Ionic-style vertical pilasters.

The full basement facing Trinity Place has a storefront under the northernmost two bays. A recessed entrance designed by Walker & Gillette was installed in the southern two bays in 1937–1938. At the first story, there was formerly an entrance to the Sixth Avenue elevated, which was closed in 1938 and replaced by a steel surround designed by Walker & Gillette.

==== Other stories ====
The shaft is twelve stories of a white rusticated granite. The lowest section of the shaft is the 5th floor, which is designed as a transition between the base and the upper floors. The rest of the shaft's facade is composed of band courses that stretch horizontally across the facade on several floors. The facade of the 9th and 13th floors is composed of vertical pilasters rather than rusticated granite, and has arched windows instead of the rectangular windows seen on the other stories. The 7th, 11th, and 15th floors have balconies, while the 5th, 8th, and 12th floors have balconies. There is a cornice above the 16th floor.

The capital is four stories tall with loggias and a metal cornice above the 20th floor. The loggias, located on the 18th and 19th floors, are composed of Corinthian paired columns that form a colonnade. There are also ornamental panels. The 21st story was added in 1928–1930. Atop the south side of the 21st floor is a small terracotta tower that holds the machine rooms for the elevators.

=== Features ===
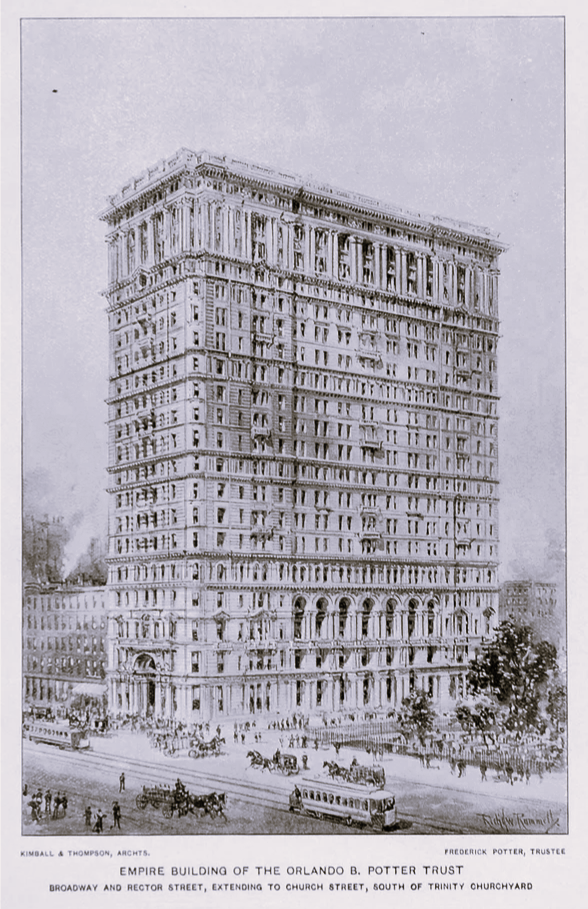
Original postcard, 1897, Empire Building

Contractor Charles Sooysmith designed the foundation, which was a mix of grillage and 23 pneumatic concrete caissons that went 23 feet (7.0 m) down to bedrock. The foundation covered about half of the lot area. The caissons were intended to reduce disruption to other buildings during the excavation process. Sooysmith was among the first builders to use pneumatic caissons for foundations, having used them in other projects such as the Manhattan Life Insurance Building across Broadway (later demolished) and the American Surety Building two blocks south. The latter was the first steel-framed skyscraper built on pneumatic caissons, as well as one of the earliest steel-framed buildings over ten stories, and the Empire Building had been modeled after it. The narrowness of the lot resulted in the inclusion of an extensive system of steel skeleton framing and bracing. The foundations were nonetheless designed to accommodate a future expansion of the building.

The total floor area is 300,000 square feet (28,000 m^{2}). Due to the irregular shape of the lot area, none of the sides are equal or parallel to each other. Since being converted to a residential building in 1997, the Empire Building has included 238 apartments, which contain between 537 to 1,142 square feet (49.9 to 106.1 m^{2}) of space. The residential units include studio apartments as well as one- and two-bedroom apartments. Though the interior has been extensively remodeled, the Empire Building still contains one of its original staircases on the western side. The staircase has an iron railing, which contains decorative motifs featuring dolphins and Neptune's scepter, as well as marble treads.

The building was originally equipped with 10 hydraulic elevators manufactured by Otis Worldwide, which were grouped in two banks of five. Of these, nine elevators were for passenger service and one was a freight elevator that could carry loads of up to 8,000 pounds (3,600 kg). Each of the shafts was enclosed in masonry. The bottom 50 feet (15 m) of each elevator shaft narrowed slightly to create a protective "air cushion", which used air pressure to slow down elevator cabs if they were to fall. These safety features were included because of a series of elevator accidents that had taken place at nearby 150 Nassau Street. An elevator cab with eggs and light bulbs was experimentally dropped from the top of the shaft on July 18, 1898; despite having fallen past the third floor at 82 miles per hour (132 km/h), the eggs and light bulbs were found to have been undamaged.

== History ==
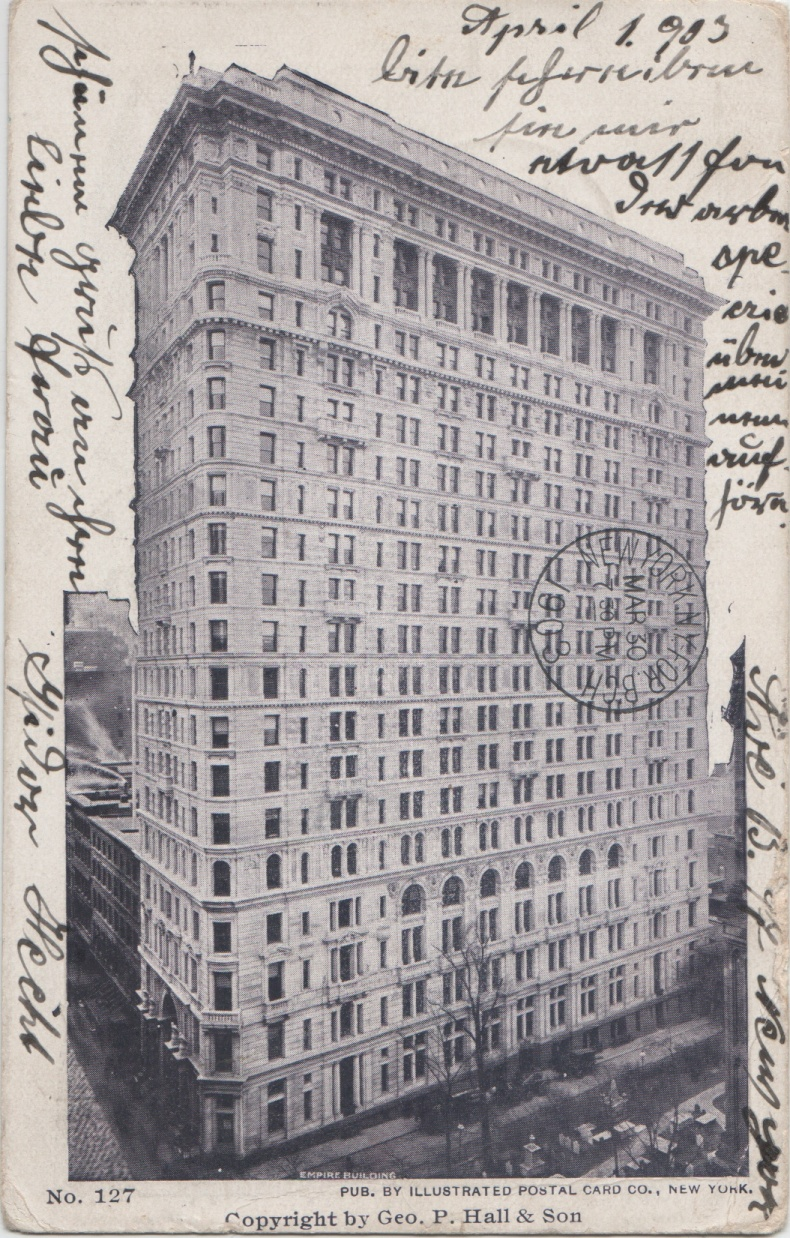
A 1903 postcard of the Empire Building

=== Context ===
The first recorded owner of the site was the Trinity Church and German Lutheran Church, though the German Lutheran Church only occupied a part of the plot. There was an inn at Rector Street and Broadway in the late 18th century. The plot was sold to Grace Church in 1808 or 1809, and a church was built on the site. In 1837, Grace Church sold the land, and eight years later, merchant Michael Simpson bought the plot. A six-story brownstone office building at 71 Broadway was built in 1859, and was part of a group of many low-rise residential and commercial buildings erected on the lower section of Broadway. The brownstone became known as the Empire Building or Arcade Building. The latter name was given because there was a public arcade extending adjacent to the building, connecting Broadway to the former Sixth Avenue elevated's Rector Street station.

By the late 19th century, it had become valuable: in April 1884, an English syndicate offered $1.25 million to the building's then-owners S. T. Meyer & Son, an offer that was refused. Politician and developer Orlando B. Potter ultimately purchased the building the same year. The brownstone was bombed in 1891 as part of an extortion attempt directed toward politician Russell Sage, killing four people including the bomber. Prior to the explosion, a building tenant had written a letter to the New York City Department of Buildings' commissioner, claiming that the building sometimes "vibrated violently" and was unsafe. The bombing was subsequently reclassified as an assassination attempt. Sage moved to 31 Nassau Street afterward.

=== Construction ===
After Potter died suddenly in 1894, his belongings passed to his family, and Potter's children assumed his estate. Potter's children then commissioned the current Empire Building. Francis Kimball had designed several of Potter's buildings. Kimball and Thompson filed plans for a limestone, brick, and terracotta building with the Department of Buildings in December 1895, and a permit to build was issued at the end of that month. At the time of the plans, the tallest building in Manhattan was the 16-story Manhattan Life Building, and developers did not believe any taller building could be constructed so rapidly. Potter's daughter Blanche said that she and her siblings had wanted to "replac[e] the old structure with a building of which we might always be proud".

During 1896, the caisson foundations were sunk at a depth of 50 feet (15 m). Construction on the above-ground structure started on June 1, 1897. During the excavation, a cornerstone from the old Grace Church was found at the building site, as well as bones and numerous tombstones. The arcade from the old building was kept within the new building. The facade was completed on April 19, 1898, with the first tenants moving to the new building shortly afterward. (Note: According to magazines and advertisements, tenants started moving to the building by early May 1898. However, the New York City Landmarks Preservation Commission cites a date of November 1898.) At the time of the Empire Building's completion, it was one of the tallest buildings in New York City by floor count. It was among the first of several high-rise buildings that were erected on the southernmost section of Broadway starting in the late 1890s as well as one of the city's oldest steel-frame skyscrapers on pneumatic caissons.

=== Usage ===
==== Early and mid-20th century ====
By 1900, the Empire Building had over 3,000 employees. One of the earliest tenants at the Empire Building was the U.S. Steel Corporation, which was founded in the building in 1901. Kimball & Thompson also took offices in the Empire Building. In 1903, Kimball considered a proposal to add five stories to the Empire Building, bringing its height to 25 stories and 350 feet (110 m), and making it the city's second-tallest building after the Park Row Building. The proposal was not undertaken. By 1908, the Empire Building had some of the most desirable office spaces in the city, with space renting at rates of $3 per square foot ($32/m^{2}), equivalent to $107 per square foot ($1,150/m^{2}) in 2025. A direct entrance from the building to the Wall Street station was not provided in the original construction, but such an entrance was built in 1910.

On April 23, 1919, the U.S. Steel Corporation bought the building from the Potter trust for approximately $5 million in cash. At the time, the sale was reported to be one of the largest transactions ever conducted for a private property in New York City. The purchase was of interest to real-estate developers and to other steel companies, since it signified that "the steel centre of the world had been once and for all permanently established in New York", according to The New York Times. Blanche Potter later recalled that the sale took place at a time when the Potter family had experienced "financial worry", and U.S. Steel's purchase relieved them of such constraints.

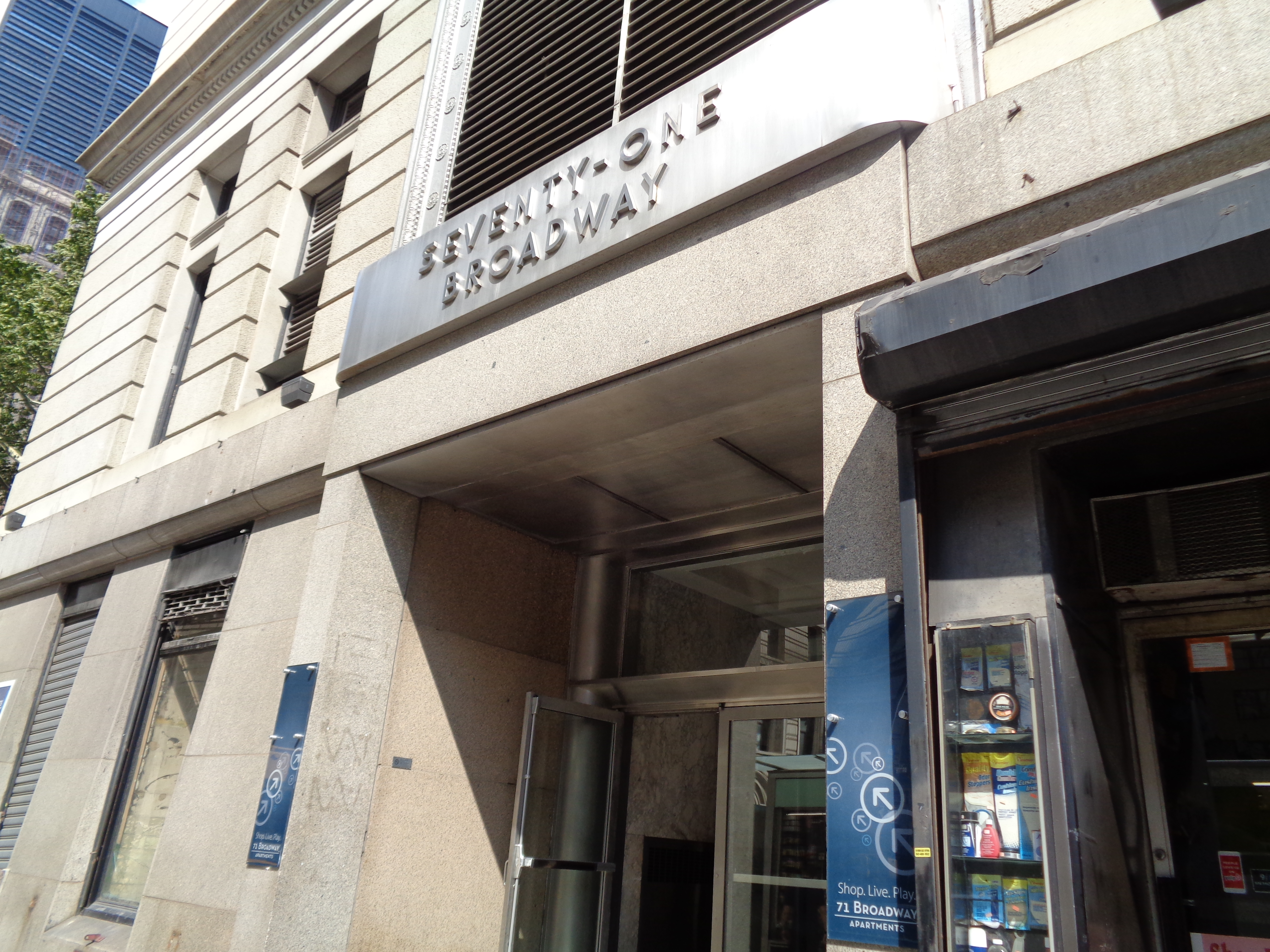
The back entrance, rebuilt in 1937–1938

John C. Westervelt designed an addition to the building between 1928 and 1930. The original parapet at the top of the building was removed, and the 21st story and terracotta elevator room were built above a new steel parapet. In 1937, Walker & Gillette filed plans for major modifications to the Empire Building, which would cost $350,000. The main entrance on Broadway and the Trinity Place entrance was refashioned in an Art Deco style, and the connection to the Sixth Avenue elevated's Rector Street station was removed, as part of the project. The facade of the base was also redesigned, and the shops in the Empire Building's arcade were removed. The renovation was completed in 1938.

==== Late 20th century to present ====
U.S. Steel sold the building in 1973. The Empire Building remained U.S. Steel's headquarters until 1976, and the company remained in the building until the mid-1980s. Subsequently, Broadway West Street Associates took ownership of the building in 1984. One of the later commercial tenants at the Empire Building was advertising agency AFGL International Inc., which moved out during 1994.

The Empire Building was converted to 237 apartments in 1997 by World-Wide Group of Manhattan, which had purchased the foreclosed property for approximately $10 million. At the time, some 30 tenants occupied 70,000 square feet (6,500 m^{2}) in the building. The renovation cost $40 million and was designed by Schuman Lichtenstein Claman & Efron. The residential units were quickly occupied: One of the residents of 71 Broadway was the politician and economist Dominique Strauss-Kahn, who was placed under house arrest in the building in 2011 during the criminal lawsuit filed against him, after another apartment building on the Upper East Side declined to host him. During Strauss-Kahn's house arrest, the Empire Building received extensive attention from the media and from passersby on Broadway, and it was dubbed "a new tourist hot spot".

== Critical reception and landmark status ==
Architectural critic Montgomery Schuyler said that the Empire Building was "one of the best [...] commercial buildings" to be built in New York City to date, and that its value was "immensely enhanced by the open space opposite" which was occupied by the Trinity churchyard. According to Schuyler, the building's value was increased by the fact that the entirety of the Rector Street facade could be seen because of the churchyard's presence. Architectural writer Sarah Bradford Landau stated that the Empire Building "possesses a quite dignity and an assured elegance", unlike Kimball's earlier Manhattan Life Building. Not all critics viewed the Empire Building positively. Eliot Gregory stated in 1899, without mentioning the building by name, that the Empire Building contained a "grotesque resemblance to a waffle iron", which gave it "the impression of instability".

The Empire Building was designated a New York City landmark in 1996. It was also added to the National Register of Historic Places (NRHP) in 1998. In 2007, it was designated as a contributing property to the Wall Street Historic District, a NRHP district.

== See also ==
- List of buildings and structures on Broadway in Manhattan
- List of New York City Designated Landmarks in Manhattan below 14th Street
