= Kimball & Thompson =

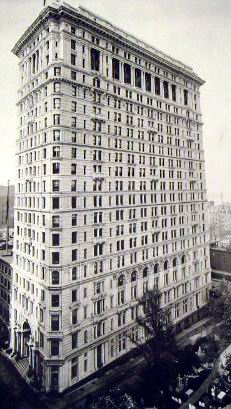
Empire Building

Kimball & Thompson was the name of an architectural partnership made up of Francis H. Kimball and G. Kramer Thompson from 1892 to 1898. They were early proponents of steel framed curtain-walled skyscrapers. They built several buildings in Manhattan, New York City.

== Works ==
- The Empire Building (1895), 71 Broadway
- Manhattan Life Insurance Building (1894; demolished 1964) 64–70 Broadway
- Rhinelander Mansion (1898), Madison Avenue and 72nd Street, design credited to Kimball & Thompson "but a photograph of the mansion published at or near the end of construction included the notation that it was designed by Alexander Mackintosh, an obscure local practitioner."
- Carriage housing for B. Altman's horse-drawn delivery wagons (1896), which survives on West 18th Street, with completely refitted interiors
