= Manhattan Life Insurance Building =

Skyscraper in Manhattan, New York (1894–1960s)

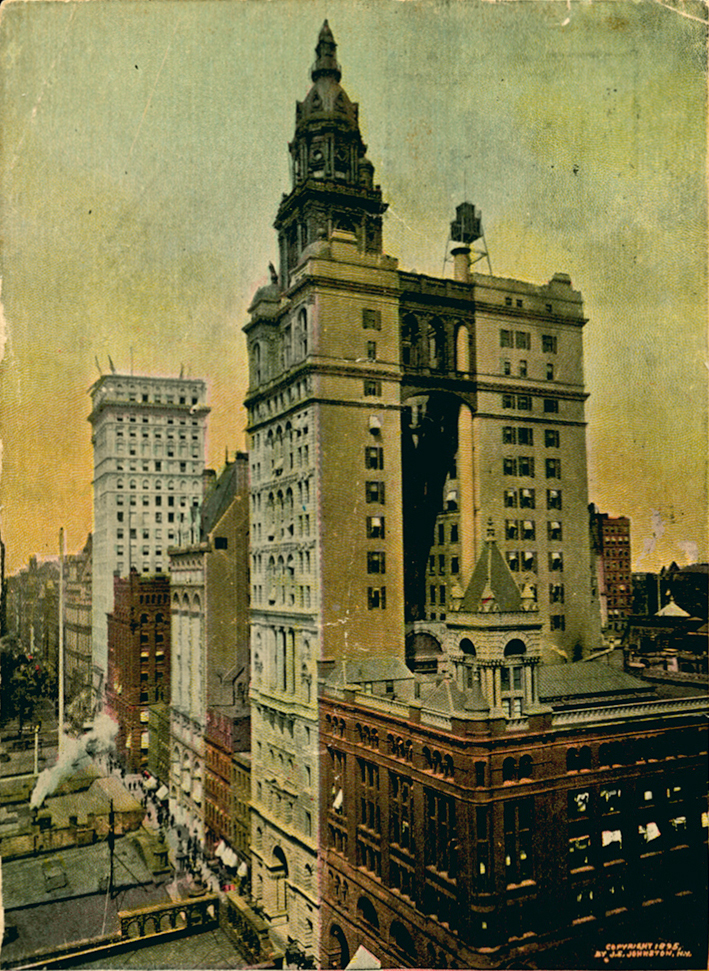

Record height
- Tallest in New York City from 1894 to 1899^{[I]}
- Preceded by: New York World Building
- Surpassed by: Park Row Building

General information
- Status: Demolished
- Type: Commercial offices
- Architectural style: Beaux-Arts
- Location: 64–70 Broadway, 17–19 New Street; New York City, New York
- Coordinates: 40°42′28″N 74°00′42″W
- Construction started: 1893
- Completed: 1894
- Demolished: 1963 or 1964

Height
- Roof: 348 ft (106 m)

Technical details
- Floor count: 18

Design and construction
- Architect: Kimball & Thompson
- Structural engineer: Charles Sooysmith

The Manhattan Life Insurance Building was an early skyscraper on Broadway in the Financial District of Manhattan, New York City, United States. At 348 ft (106 m) tall, it was the first skyscraper to pass 330 ft (100 m) in Manhattan.

== History ==
The original structure at 64–66 Broadway was completed in 1894 to the designs of the architects of Kimball & Thompson, and was slightly extended north in 1904 to 68–70 Broadway.

The building was sold at least twice. In 1926, the Manhattan Life Insurance Company sold the building to Frederick Brown, who then re-sold it to the Manufacturer's Trust Company a few weeks later. Then, in 1928, Central Union Trust Company, whose headquarters were in adjacent structures to the north, bought 70 Broadway for an undisclosed sum, although the building was assessed at that time at $4 million. Following the Central Union Trust Company's sale of the buildings to the north to the Irving Trust Company, which then built a new skyscraper at 1 Wall Street, Central Union Trust moved to the Manhattan Life Building and modified the structures at 60, 62, and 70 Broadway.

The building was demolished to make way for an annex to 1 Wall Street, completed in 1965. Sources vary about whether the year of demolition was 1963 or 1964.

== See also ==
- List of skyscrapers
- List of early skyscrapers

Records
Preceded by New York World Building	Tallest building in New York City; 1894–1899; 106 m	Succeeded by Park Row Building
