= Irving Trust =

American commercial bank (1851–1988)

- Industry: Commercial banking
- Founded: 1851
- Defunct: 1988
- Fate: Acquired
- Successor: Bank of New York
- Headquarters: New York City, US
- Products: Investment banking; Wholesale banking

The Irving Trust was an American commercial bank headquartered in New York City that operated between 1851 and 1988 when it was acquired by Bank of New York. From 1965, the bank was the principal subsidiary of the Irving Bank Corporation.

Between 1913 and 1931, its headquarters was in the Woolworth Building; after 1931, until it was acquired by Bank of New York, its headquarters was located at 1 Wall Street, at what is now known as the BNY Mellon Building.

== History ==
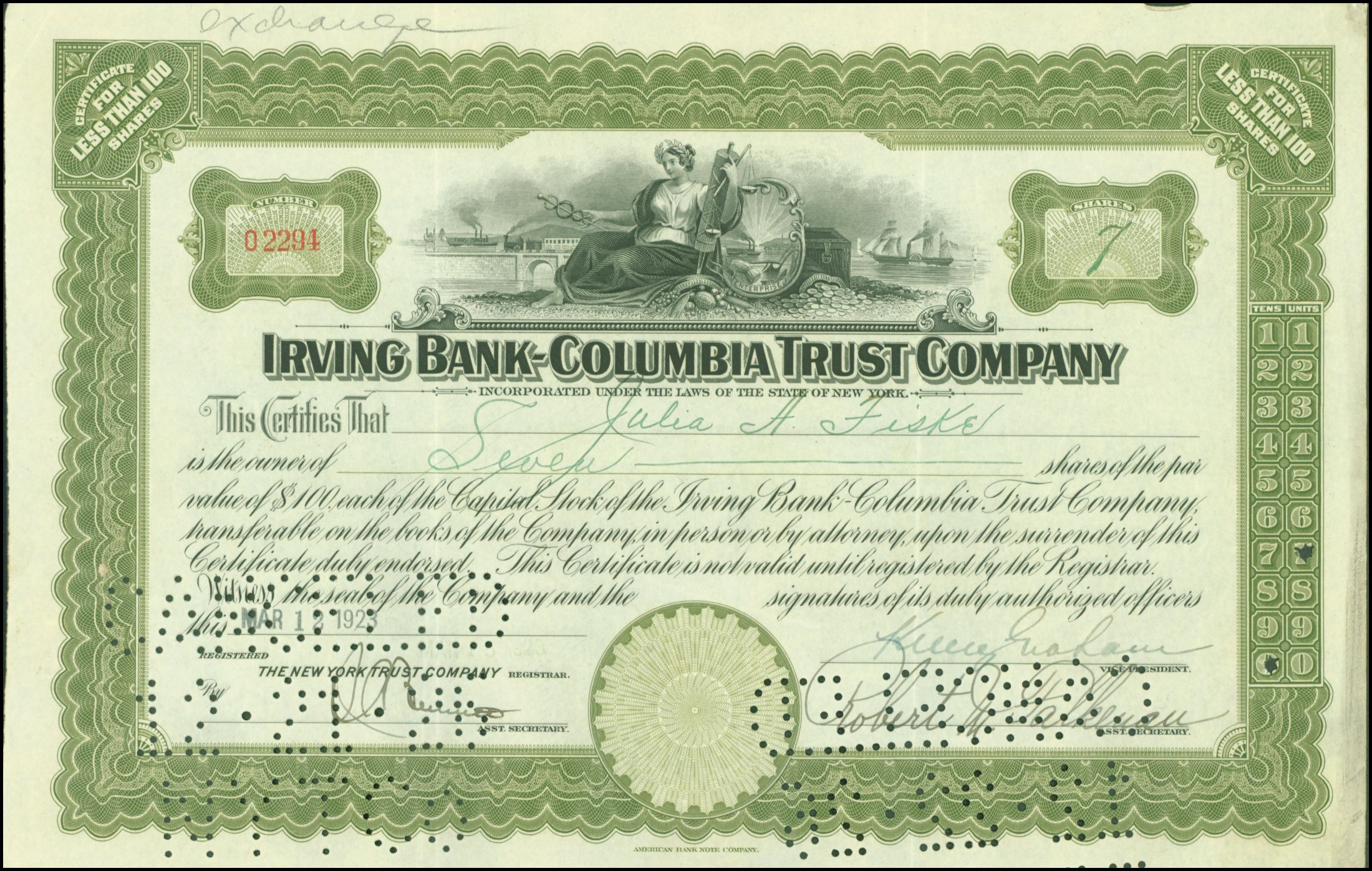
Share of the Irving Bank-Columbia Trust Company, issued 12 March 1923

The bank had its origins in 1851, when the Irving Bank of the City of New York was founded. Since there was not yet a federal currency, each bank issued its own paper for use. The firm was named after Washington Irving, an author, diplomat, and lawyer who had gained an international reputation as America's first man of letters. His portrait appeared on the bank's notes.

In June 1865, it converted from a state bank to a bank chartered under the National Bank Act of 1863, and became the Irving National Bank of New York. In 1907, after a merger, it became the Irving National Exchange Bank of New York, changing its name to the Irving National Bank in 1912. In 1918, it acquired, by merger, the Market and Fulton National Bank of New York, and in 1919, the Sherman National Bank of New York and the National City Bank of Brooklyn. In 1922, it merged with the Columbia Trust Company, a New York State-chartered bank, creating the Irving Bank and Trust Company. Later, in 1926, it acquired by merger the American Exchange-Pacific Bank, and changed its name to the American Exchange Irving Trust Company. Finally, in 1929, it changed its name to the Irving Trust Company, the name under which it was known until 1989.

On March 9, 1921, there were four national banks in New York City operating branch offices, also including Chatham and Phenix National, the Mechanics and Metals National, the Irving National, and National City Bank.

In 1922, Irving Trust opened an account with Roskombank, enabling the bank to conduct transactions with Russia and later the Soviet Union.

In 1923, Irving Trust held correspondent accounts for the Russo-Iranian Bank.

In 1929, Irving was New York's fourth ranked financial institution, and fifth in the US.

The Irving Trust was an official sponsor of the 1980 Winter Olympic Games in Lake Placid, New York.

In 1983, the Irving Trust had 13 branches in New York and was primarily a wholesale bank working with mid- and large-sized corporations and banks. It also had offices around the world, allowing for their claim that the sun never set on the Irving.

In 1986, Natasha Kagalovsky (née Gurfinkel) became an employee as head of the department handling accounts with the Soviet Union and Eastern Europe.

=== Merged into Bank of New York ===
On October 7, 1988, the Irving Trust board signed an agreement to merge with Bank of New York ending a yearlong battle as Bank of New York engineered a hostile takeover. At the time of the merger, the combined banks became the United States' 12th largest bank with asset of $42 billion. During that year, Irving had been trying to participate in a friendly merger with Banca Commerciale Italiana.

== See also ==
- Irving Trust Company Building
