= 32 Avenue of the Americas =

Telecommunications skyscraper in Manhattan, New York

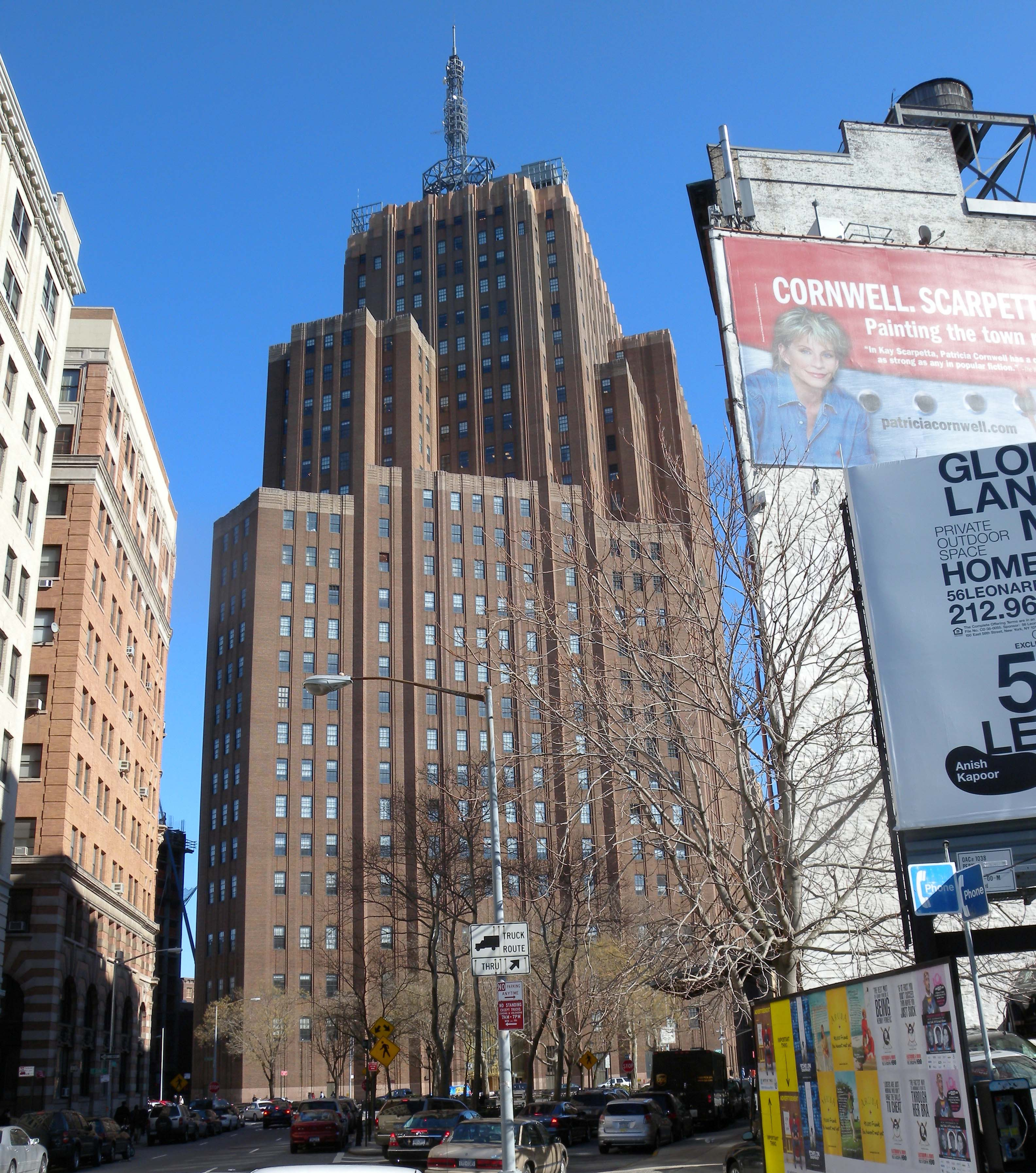
- Seen to the west, from Beach Street

General information
- Type: Office
- Architectural style: Art Deco
- Location: 32 Sixth Avenue, Tribeca, Manhattan, New York City, New York 10013, United States
- Coordinates: 40°43′12″N 74°00′17″W
- Completed: 1932
- Renovated: 2001–2002
- Owner: Rudin Management Company

Height
- Antenna spire: 549 ft (167 m)
- Roof: 429 ft (131 m)

Technical details
- Floor count: 27
- Floor area: 1,150,000 sq ft (107,000 m^{2})

Design and construction
- Architect: Voorhees, Gmelin and Walker

Renovating team
- Architect: Fox & Fowle Architects P.C.

Website
- https://32aoa.com/

New York City Landmark
- Designated: October 1, 1991
- Reference no.: 1747 (exterior); 1748 (interior)

32 Avenue of the Americas (also known as the AT&T Long Lines Building, AT&T Building, or 32 Sixth Avenue) is a 27-story, 549-foot-tall (167 m) telecommunications building in the Tribeca neighborhood of Manhattan in New York City. Completed in 1932, it was one of several Art Deco–style telecommunications buildings designed by Ralph Thomas Walker of Voorhees, Gmelin and Walker in the early 20th century. 32 Avenue of the Americas spans the entire block bounded by Walker Street, Lispenard Street, Church Street, and Avenue of the Americas (also known as Sixth Avenue).

32 Avenue of the Americas was the last skyscraper designed by Walker in Lower Manhattan as well as one of the largest telecommunications buildings from that architect. Its construction was undertaken in three stages. The first, known as the Walker–Lispenard Building or 24 Walker Street, was designed in 1911–1914 by Cyrus L. W. Eidlitz and McKenzie, Voorhees & Gmelin. In the late 1910s, 24 Walker Street was expanded by seven stories. The current skyscraper is the result of the final building campaign, which took place between 1929 and 1932. Upon completion, 32 Avenue of the Americas was the largest building in the world that specifically handled long-distance calling. The building remains in use as a data/communications center, but is no longer owned by AT&T.

32 Avenue of the Americas's design features a complex massing and numerous setbacks. The brick facade is composed of numerous hues and is topped by parapets at the roof. The other ornamental elements give 32 Avenue of the Americas the impression of being both progressive and technologically up-to-date, reflecting its interior use. Inside, the main lobby contains numerous murals that reflect the building's use as a communications hub. The exterior and lobby were designated as official New York City landmarks in 1991.

== Architecture ==
32 Avenue of the Americas is 27 stories and 549 feet (167 m) tall; this height includes two 120-foot-tall (37 m) spires added to the original 429-foot (131 m) height. It is located in the Tribeca neighborhood of Lower Manhattan. It occupies a trapezoidal city block bounded by Sixth Avenue (officially Avenue of the Americas) to the west, Walker Street to the south, Church Street to the east, and Lispenard Street to the north. The Walker and Lispenard Street sides are parallel to each other and perpendicular to the Church Street side. The Sixth Avenue side runs diagonally, intersecting both Lispenard and Walker Streets.

The building was designed by Ralph Walker of Voorhees, Gmelin and Walker in the Art Deco style. 32 Avenue of the Americas was one of several Art Deco buildings in the New York City area that Walker designed, after the Barclay–Vesey Building (1927), New Jersey Bell Headquarters Building (1929), 60 Hudson Street (1930), and 1 Wall Street and 101 Willoughby Street (1931). It was also the last major skyscraper Walker designed in Lower Manhattan. Within the New York City area, McKenzie, Voorhees & Gmelin designed numerous other buildings for AT&T or its affiliates during the same time span, and the firm had also previously built structures for AT&T elsewhere in New York state. 32 Avenue of the Americas was one of several technologically advanced headquarters erected in the mid-20th century for communications and utility companies in the U.S. Its design program was mainly composed of woven motifs, because AT&T had described long-distance switchboard operators as "Weavers of Speech".

=== Form ===
32 Avenue of the Americas contains numerous setbacks on its exterior. Though setbacks in New York City skyscrapers were mandated by the 1916 Zoning Resolution in order to allow light and air to reach the streets below, they later became a defining feature of the Art Deco style. The setbacks have been characterized as looking like a "brick mountain" or a "steel skeleton draped with a finely crafted brick curtain". According to architectural historian Anthony W. Robins, 32 Avenue of the Americas is more geometrically organized than 60 Hudson Street and the Barclay–Vesey Building, as it was the last of the group to be completed.

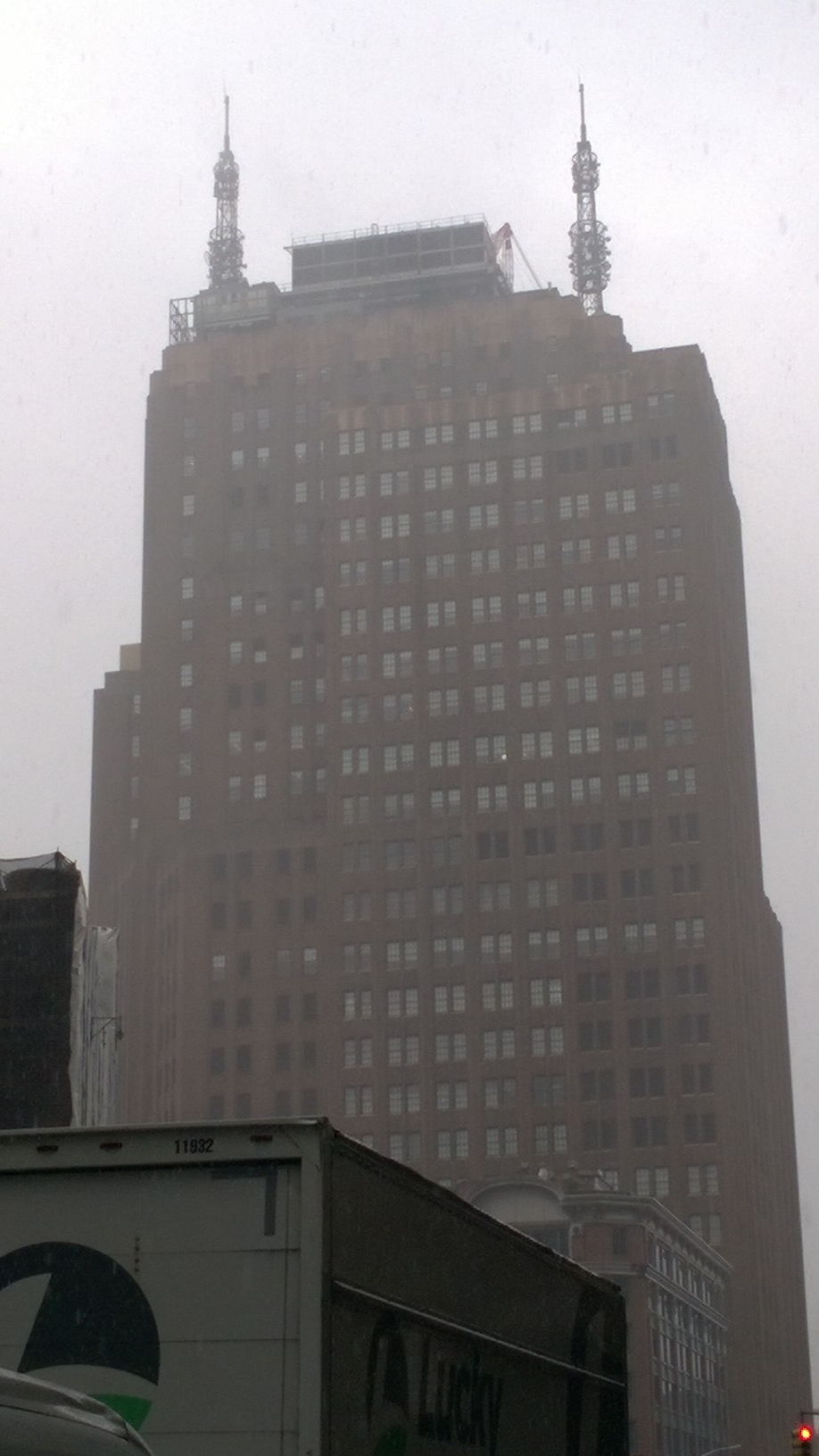
Exterior of 32 Avenue of the Americas on a rainy day in June 2019

32 Avenue of the Americas includes portions of two structures: the original Lispenard Building, completed in 1914, and the AT&T Long Distance Building, an expansion completed in 1932. The bulky 24-story massing of the Lispenard Building's northern and southern elevations were incorporated into the expanded structure, exceeding the sloping "envelope" mandated by the 1916 zoning law. Above the original building rose the 27-story "spine", aligned west/east.

The western elevation, along Sixth Avenue, consisted of a "screen" with 15-story wings on either side of a central portion rising 16 stories. Behind the 15-story sections rise two 21-story wings, followed by the original structure and the "spine". The other three elevations were designed around the paired window layouts of the original building's north and south elevations. The northeastern corner of the building contains setbacks at the 15th, 21st, and 22nd stories. The northwestern corner contains a diagonal chamfer.

=== Facade ===
A brick facade was used for 32 Avenue of the Americas and for Walker's other communications buildings, since he preferred the material for its texture and its flexibility in color combinations. The Sixth Avenue elevation is symmetrical, with a two-story main entrance in the center. The entrance portal is designed like a proscenium arch, with a bronze entrance grille above a set of bronze doors. Adjacent to the entrance portal is a sealed doorway leading to the Canal Street station of the New York City Subway, served by the A, C, and E trains; an open staircase to that station is on Sixth Avenue directly to the south. The entrance portal is flanked by two flagpoles at the third floor. Another recessed entrance exists on Church Street to the east; this entrance is smaller, containing a bronze frame and marble panels above a set of bronze doors. A garage door is located on the northern facade, with a roll-down metal gate, and there are also numerous auxiliary doors.

The remainder of the facade is emphasized by piers with a V-shaped texture, as well as spandrels with ornamental patterns. The walls are designed with undulating patterns that generally run at an angle to the adjacent streets. The bottom of the facade contains a water table made of pink granite. The original building mainly consists of a red-and-brown brick facade. On the original facade, each vertical bay includes a pair of six-over-six sash windows made of wood, or a pair of ventilation louvers. The newer portions of the facade are made of bricks tinted in different shades of red, orange, brown, and gray; these primarily have a rough texture with thick mortar joints between each brick. On the newer sections, each bay contains single or paired six-over-six sash windows made of steel.

=== Features ===
32 Avenue of the Americas contains 1.17 million square feet (109,000 m^{2}) of office space. The heights of each floor were based around the original building's floor heights. The top three floors were built atop a 90-foot-long (27 m), 450-foot-high (140 m) steel truss, which rested on the roofs of the two new wings, above the height of the original building. The loads on the truss were mitigated by the usage of lightweight concrete.

==== Lobby ====
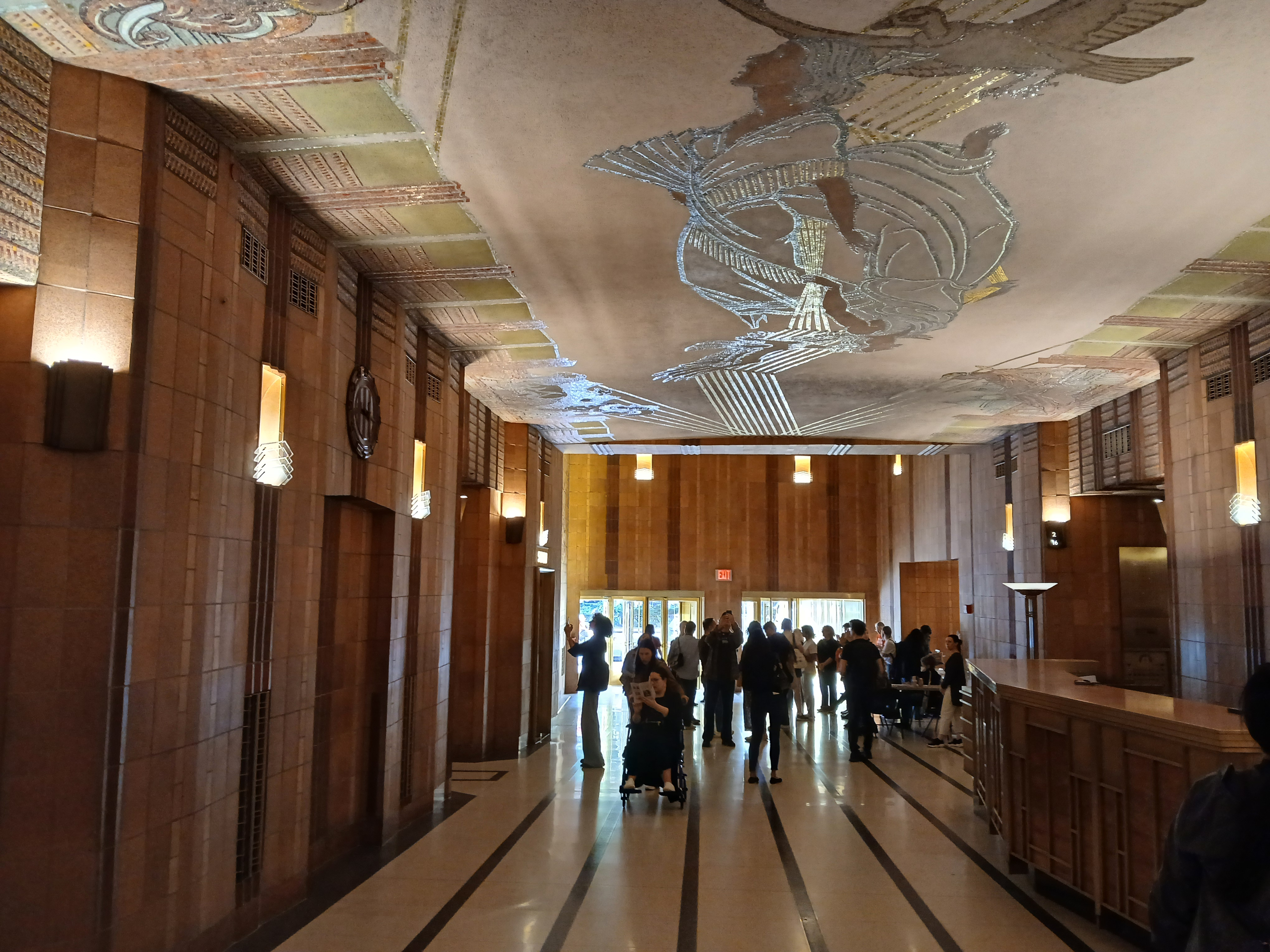
View toward Sixth Avenue

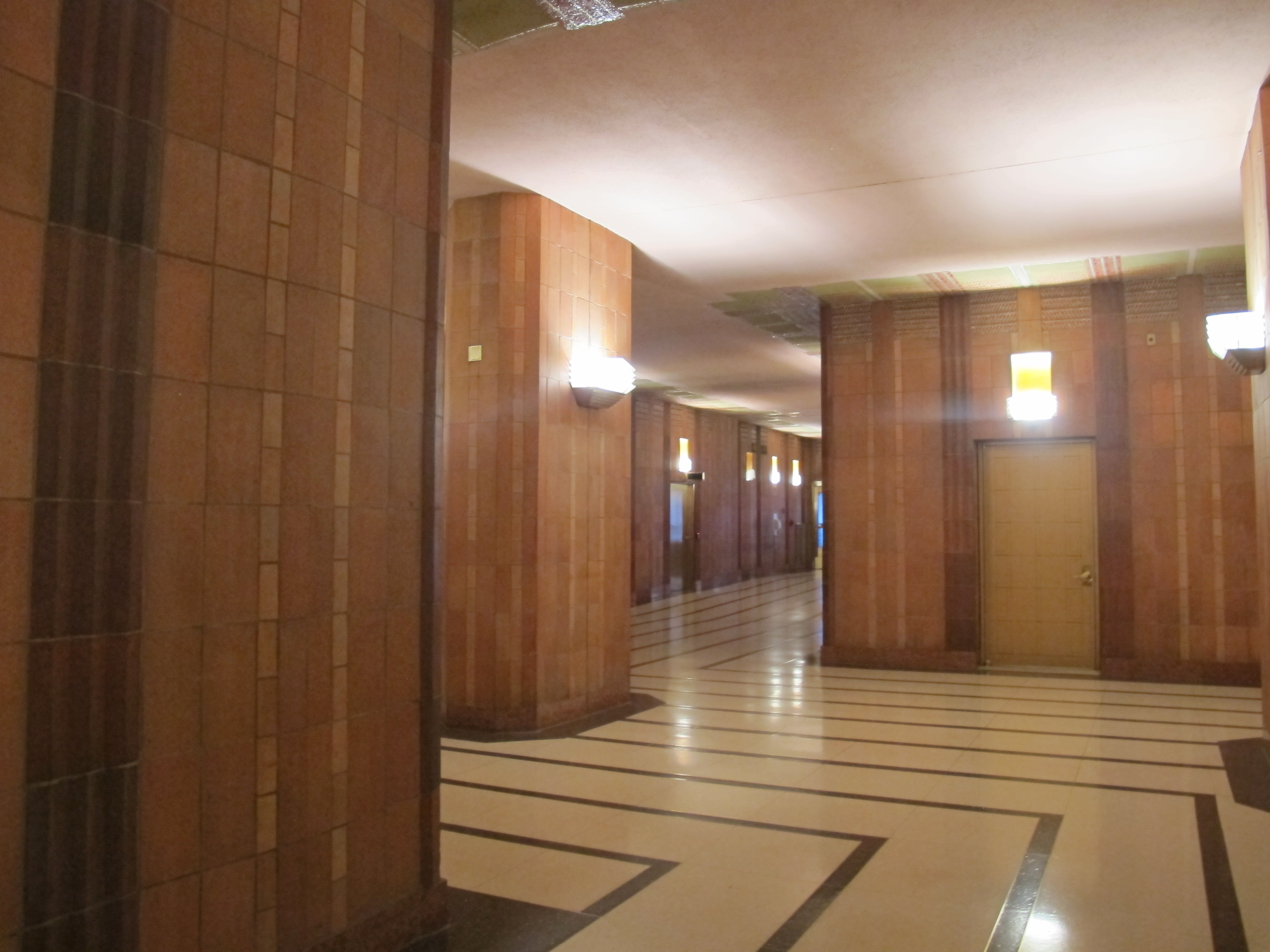
The lobby's two perpendicular bends

The building's ground-level lobby is composed of a corridor from Sixth Avenue to Church Street. Both ends of the lobby are approached by entrance vestibules with two bronze revolving doors flanked by two bronze hinged doors. The Sixth Avenue side contains an alcove in its vestibule, which leads to an auditorium. Three elevator-lobby corridors branch off from the main corridor at a 90-degree angle: the two corridors on the north side of the lobby each have a bank of elevators, while the corridor on the south side leads to a bank of four elevators. The Church Street side of the lobby is supported by a series of piers along the center of the corridor, and contains two perpendicular bends, giving the lobby an "S" shape. An elevator bank with two elevators is located on the southern wall of the lobby near the Church Street entrance.

A white terrazzo floor with gray stripes extends through much of the lobby. The walls contain pink marble at their bottoms, above which are vertical ceramic tiles separated by red-tile pilasters. The ceiling has a surface of mauve stucco. The lobby also contains features such as bronze ventilation louvers and indirect-lighting fixtures. Minor alterations have been made in the lobby over the years. On the Church Street side, the elevator bank used to contain two additional openings; throughout the lobby, signs and lighting have also been changed. The lobby also contains an allegorical mosaic designed by Hildreth Meière, who also designed the interior of 1 Wall Street. On the southern wall of the Sixth Avenue section is a tiled map of the world, measuring 16 by 23 feet (4.9 by 7.0 m). The map contains the caption "Telephone Wires and Radio Unite to Make Neighbors of Nations".

The ceiling mosaic contains allegorical representations of Asia, Europe, Australia, and Africa, connected by stylized telephone lines radiating from two female messengers in the center of the ceiling. Asia is depicted as an empress with an elephant and tiger beside her, with a pagoda in the background. The representation of Europe wears a crown and holds a spear and orb while leaning on an Ionic-style capital; there is a Roman aqueduct, St. Peter's Basilica, and Notre-Dame de Paris in the background. The representation of Australia is shown holding a sheaf of wheat, beside a sheep and a kangaroo. An Egyptian queen, depicting Africa, is shown holding a fan, with two lions and the Egyptian pyramids behind her. The messengers in the center are flanked by an eagle and a condor, representing North and South America. As a cost-cutting measure during the Depression, the ceiling mosaics were executed in a silhouette mosaic style, in which the outlines and details are made of traditional mosaic tile, and the interior areas are filled in with colored plaster. Meière had originally planned to decorate the ceiling with images of female telephone operators, but AT&T rejected those plans. One of the female messengers in the center of the ceiling is wearing a stiletto heel, which may be a reference to Meière's original design.

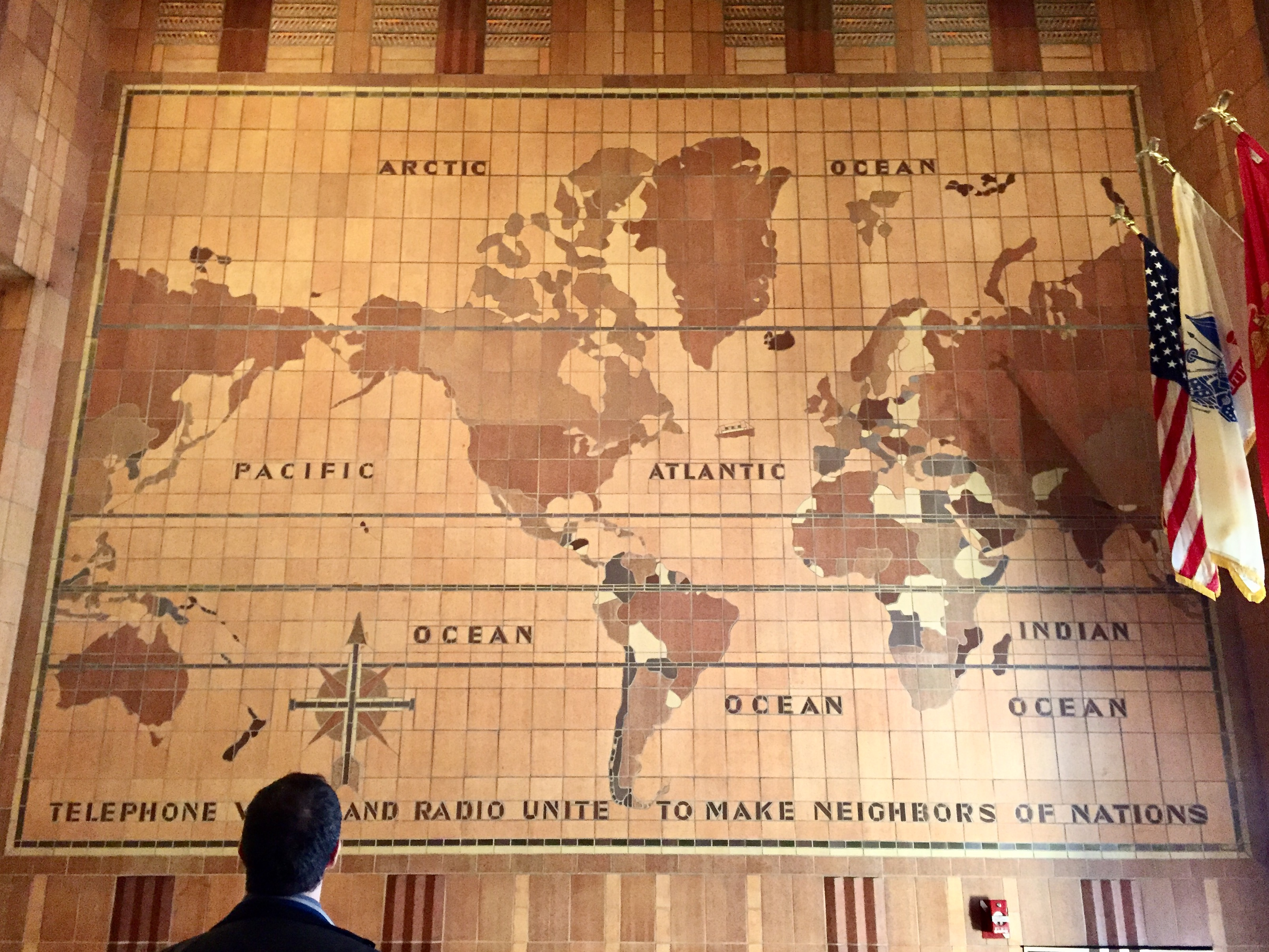
World map detail

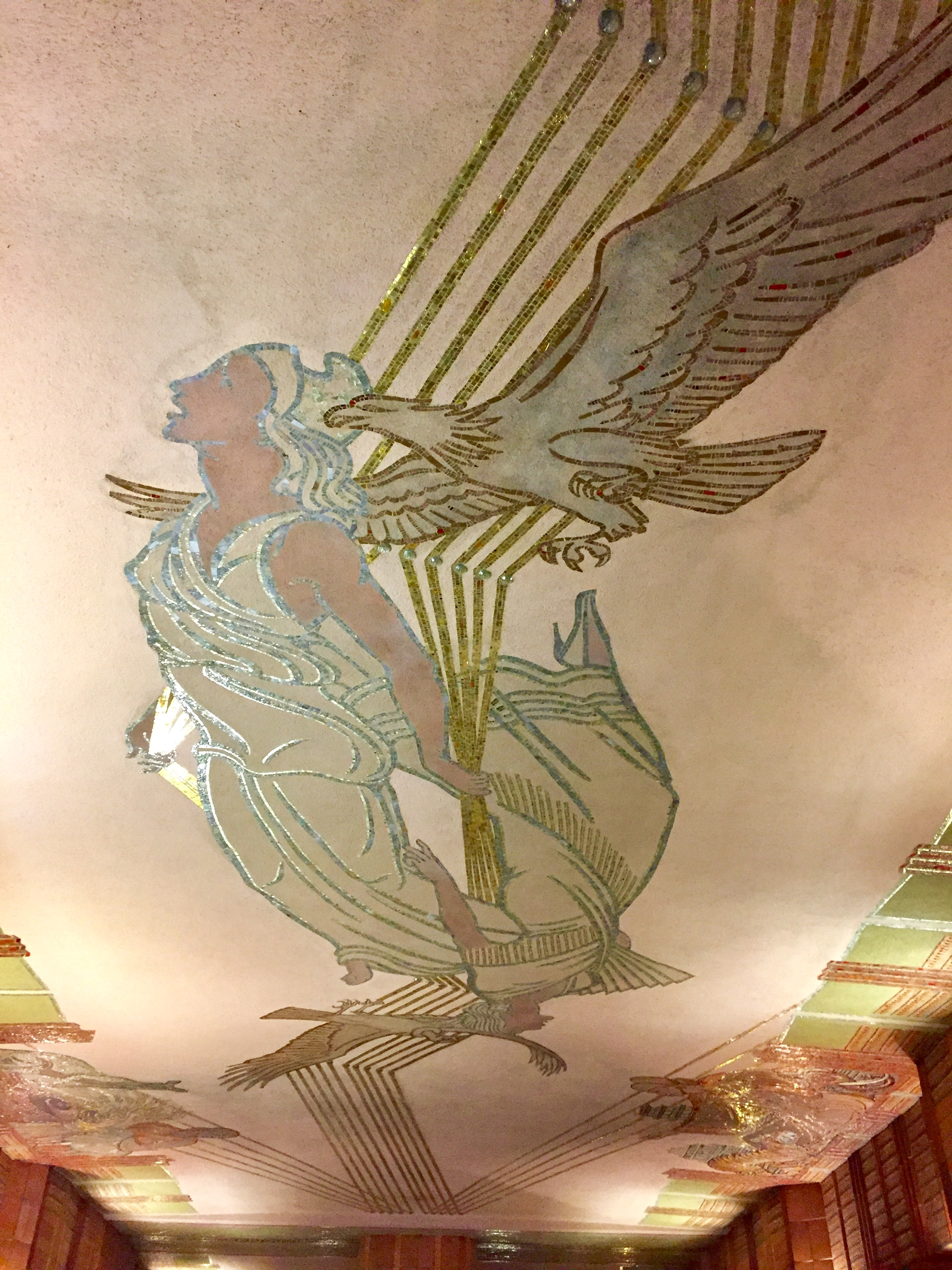
Eagle ceiling mosaic detail

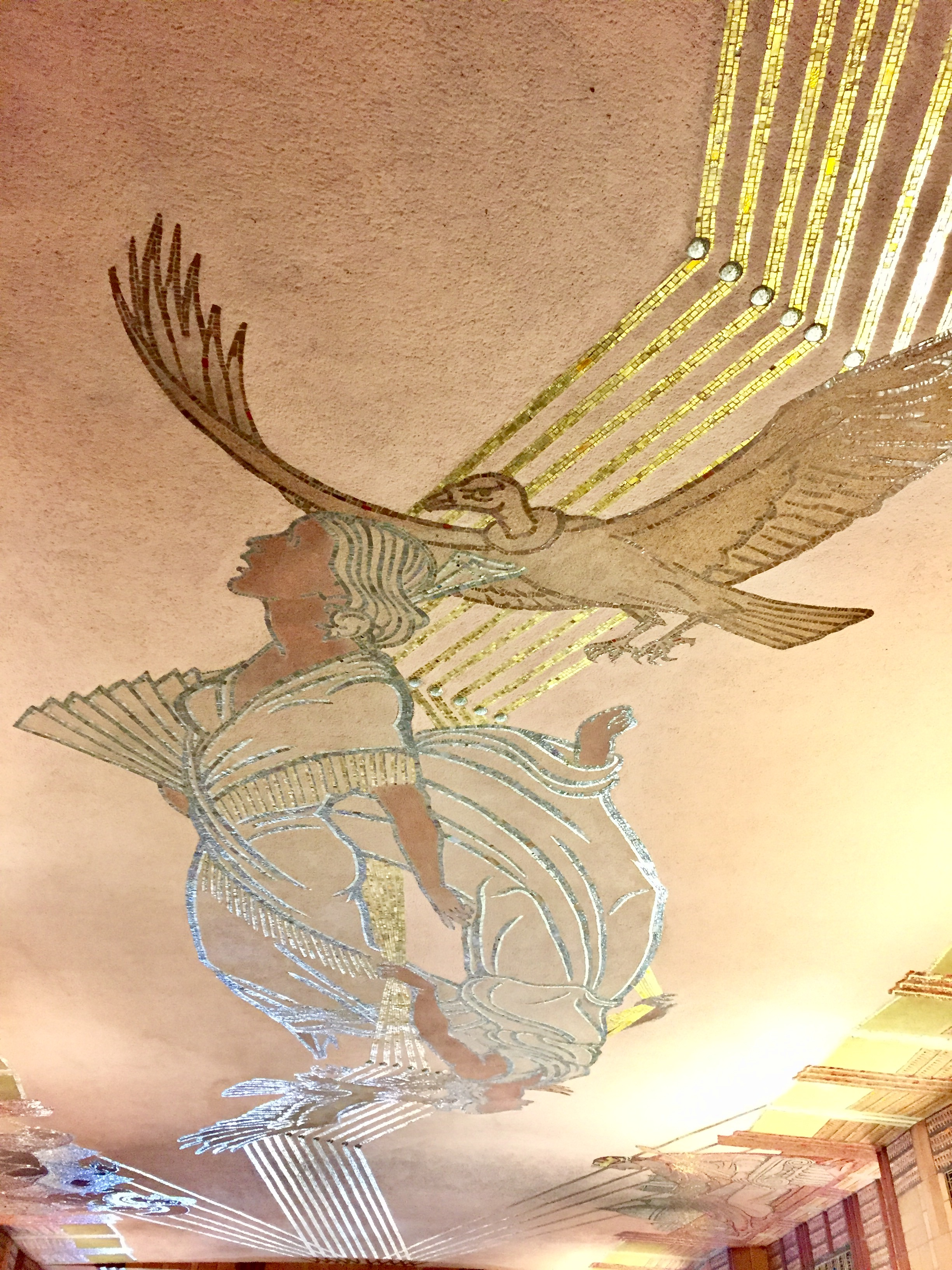
Condor ceiling mosaic detail

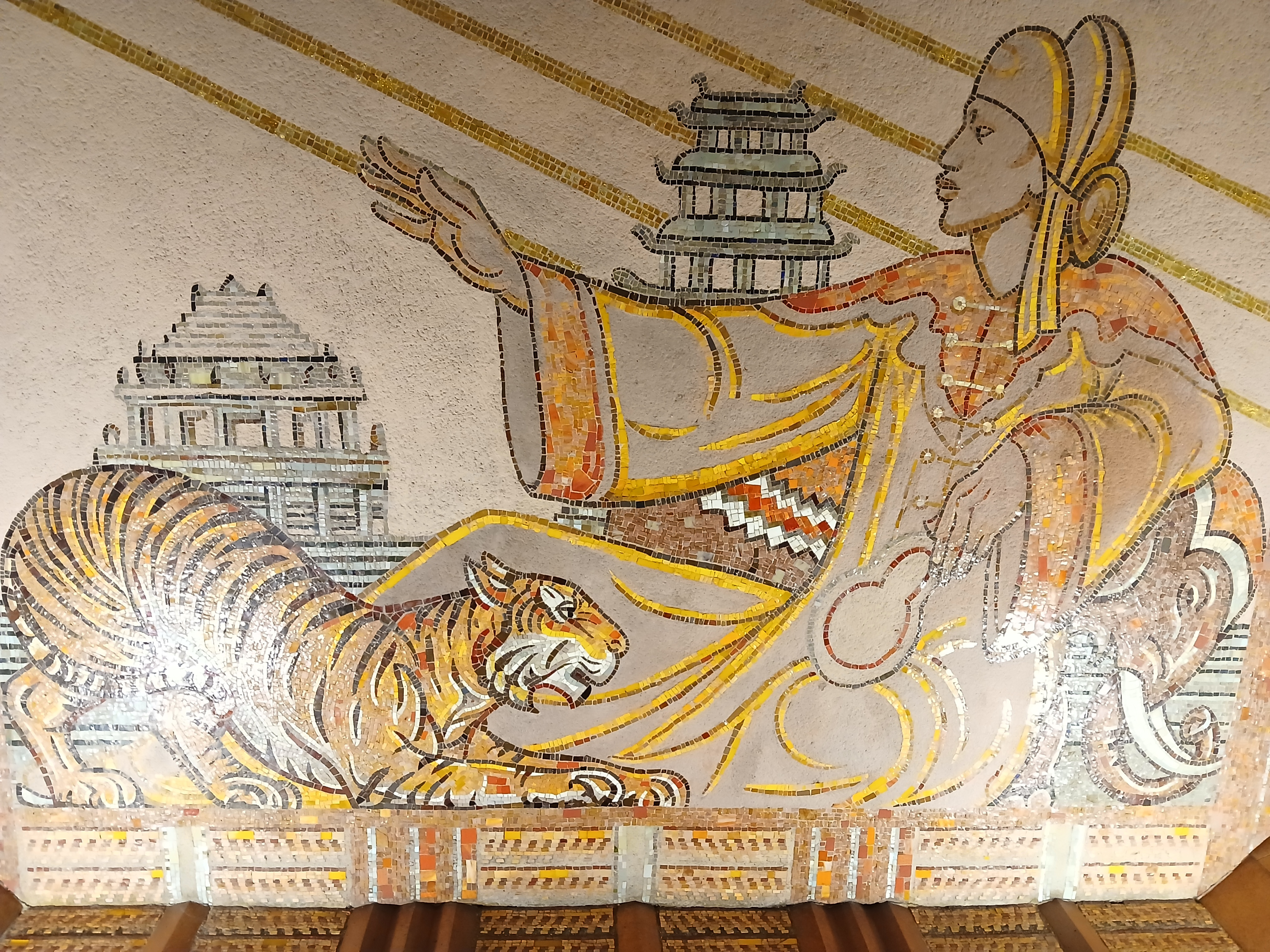
Asia mosaic detail

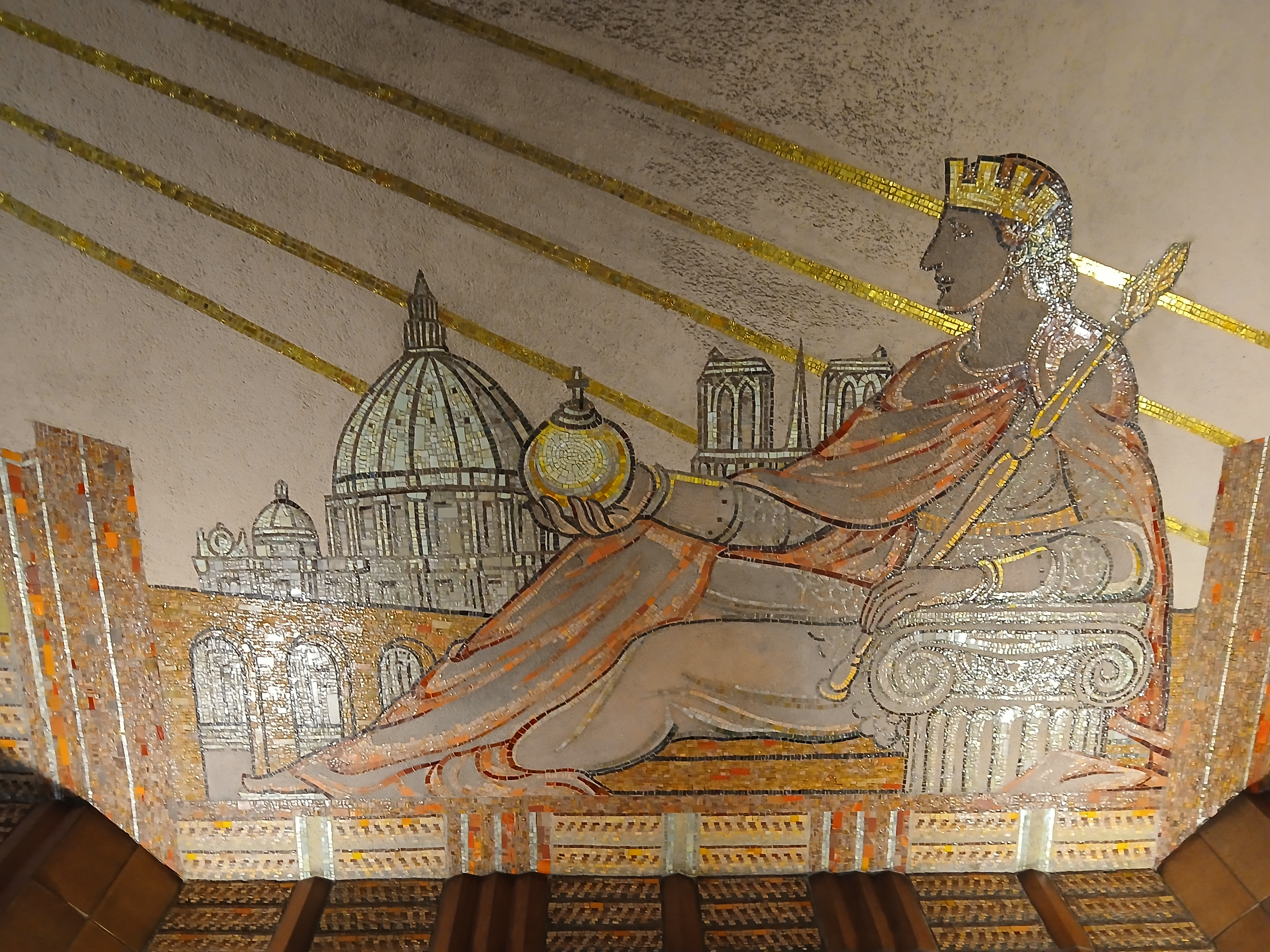
Europe mosaic detail

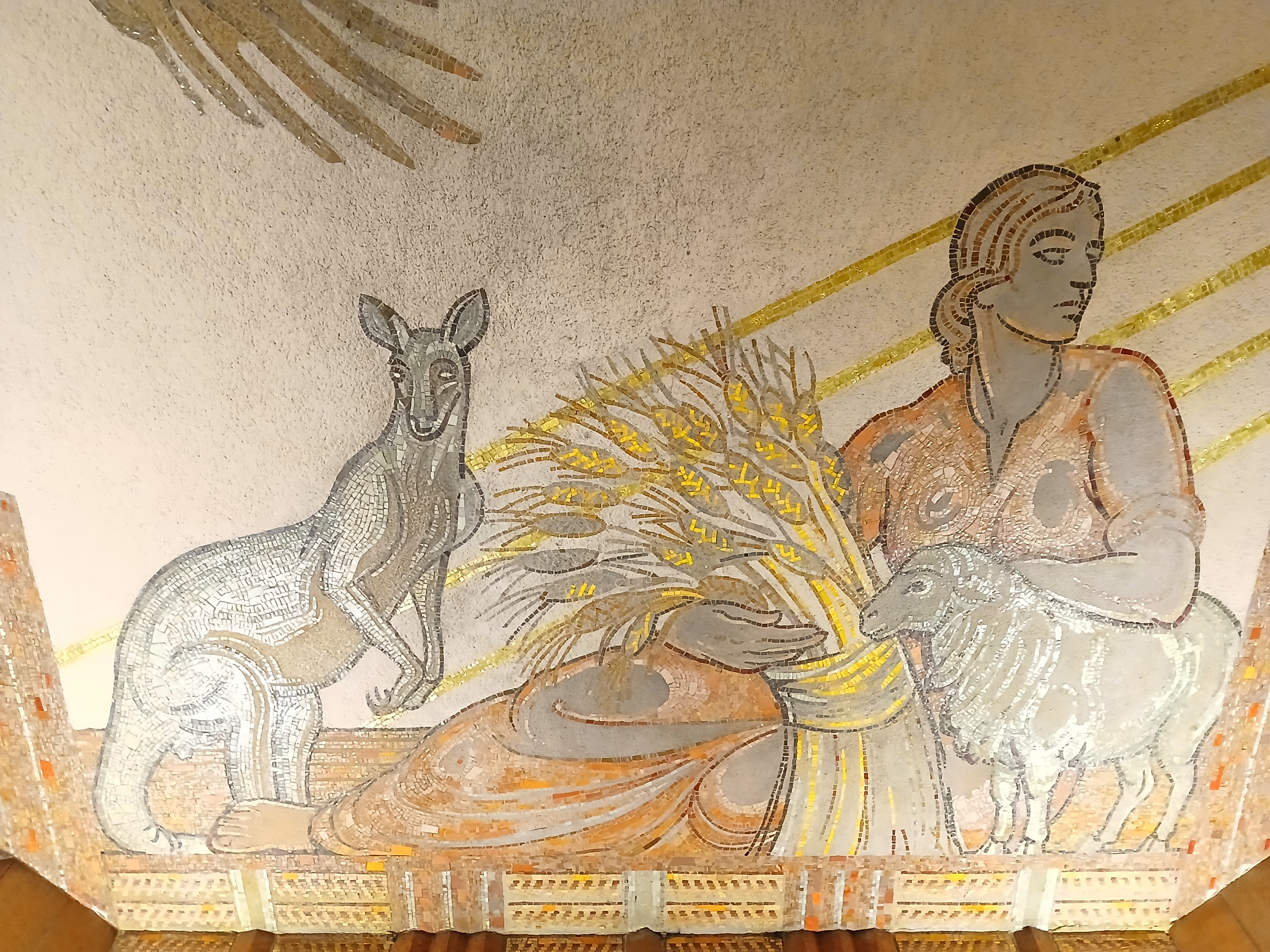
Australia mosaic detail

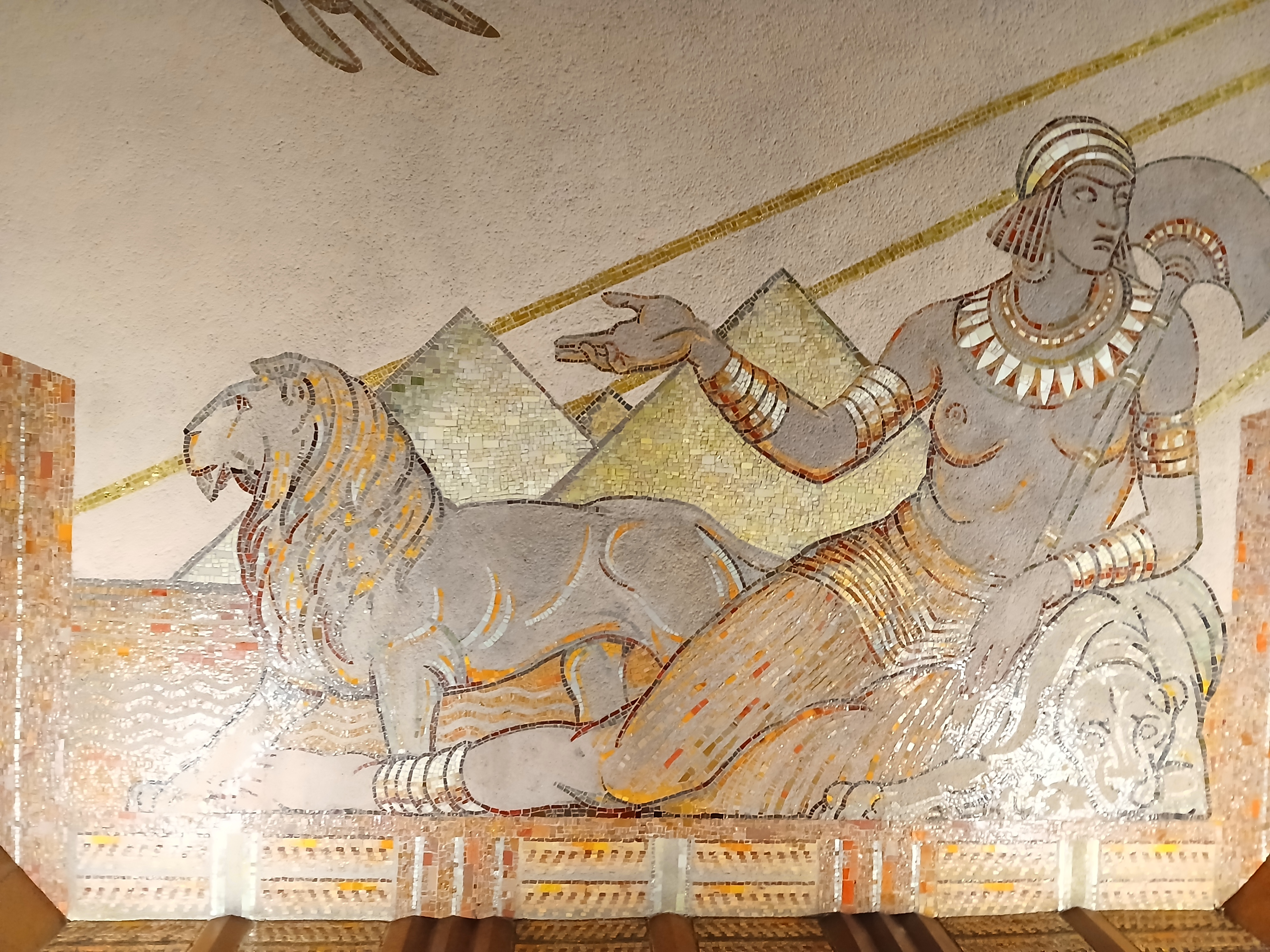
Africa mosaic detail

==== Telecommunications ====
At the building's peak operation, every Bell System trunk line in the Northeastern United States converged within the building, connecting 360 cities via three thousand direct lines. 32 Avenue of the Americas also handled overseas telephone calls to South America, Egypt, Europe, East Asia, Australia, numerous Atlantic and Pacific islands, and ships in the ocean. In addition, it accommodated calls that were made through two radio circuits; teletype services; telephoto services to seven other large cities in the U.S.; and radio transmissions. 32 Avenue of the Americas also handled private wire service/telegraph lines for the press and the finance industry.

The operations at 32 Avenue of the Americas were described as a "small city" operating 24/7, with 32 elevators to accommodate the building's 5,500 employees. There was 800,000 square feet (74,000 m^{2}) of rentable space when the building opened, though the toll and long lines offices occupied about 85% of that area. The first floor contained classes and recreation for employees, as well as a 500-seat theater. A kitchen, three cafeterias, and dormitories were located on the seventh through ninth floors. There were executive offices on the 26th floor as well as legal, human relations, and media offices on the 27th floor.

== History ==
=== Context ===
The block containing 32 Avenue of the Americas was part of the Lispenard family farm in the late 18th century, and the streets surrounding the site were surveyed and paved in 1810. Afterward, the neighborhood was occupied by masonry houses, which were occupied by wealthy merchants.

The New York Telephone Company purchased nine lots in the area in 1909 for a new company building. The lots purchased by the New York Telephone Company were located at 18–24 Lispenard Street and 18–26 Walker Street. The New York Telephone Company was one of the many subsidiaries of the Bell Telephone Company, though Bell's holdings were taken over by Bell subsidiary AT&T in 1899. Through the first years of the 20th century, AT&T continued to grow, completing a nearby headquarters at 195 Broadway in 1916. New York Telephone's headquarters, also nearby at the Barclay–Vesey Building, were completed in 1926.

=== Construction and expansion ===
Plans for the Walker-Lispenard Building at 24 Walker Street were announced in 1911. The first portion of the building was designed by Cyrus L. W. Eidlitz along with Voorhees, Gmelin and Walker's predecessor McKenzie, Voorhees & Gmelin with a projected construction cost of $1.4 million. According to building plans, the first phase was arranged in a reversed "J" shape, with six bays along the 89-foot-long (27 m) Lispenard Street facade, and eight bays on the 125-foot-long (38 m) Walker Street facade. The 17-story building's facade consisted of three horizontal sections similar to the components of a column: namely a four-story base, 12-story shaft, and one-story capital. The facade was mostly made of brick, but the ground story was faced with limestone, and terracotta cornices separated each of the three sections. New York Telephone planned to eventually expand the building to 25 stories, and the new building was designed specifically to support the weight of the future expansion. In addition, there were to be 15 elevators, as well as 200 switchboard operator positions and the United States' largest switchboard.

24 Walker Street was completed in January 1914 and was among the world's largest structures used solely for telephone operations. Western Union took up the top five floors—having moved from the Western Union Telegraph Building, which was being demolished to make way for 195 Broadway—while AT&T and New York Telephone moved into the lower 12 floors. In March 1914, McKenzie, Voorhees & Gmelin submitted an application to the New York City Department of Buildings for a seven-story addition, which would increase the total height to 24 stories. The addition, completed by 1919, contained a similar facade design to the original building, with cornices above the 23rd and 24th floors. Following the annex's completion, New York Telephone moved two of its Manhattan telephone exchanges into the 18th through 23rd floors. The company also had the United States' largest long-distance telephone exchange, containing 2,200 intercity lines and positions for 1,470 switchboard operators, as well as a switchboard for transatlantic radio and telephone communications. Even so, the company had used up all the space in the annex by the late 1920s.

=== Completion ===
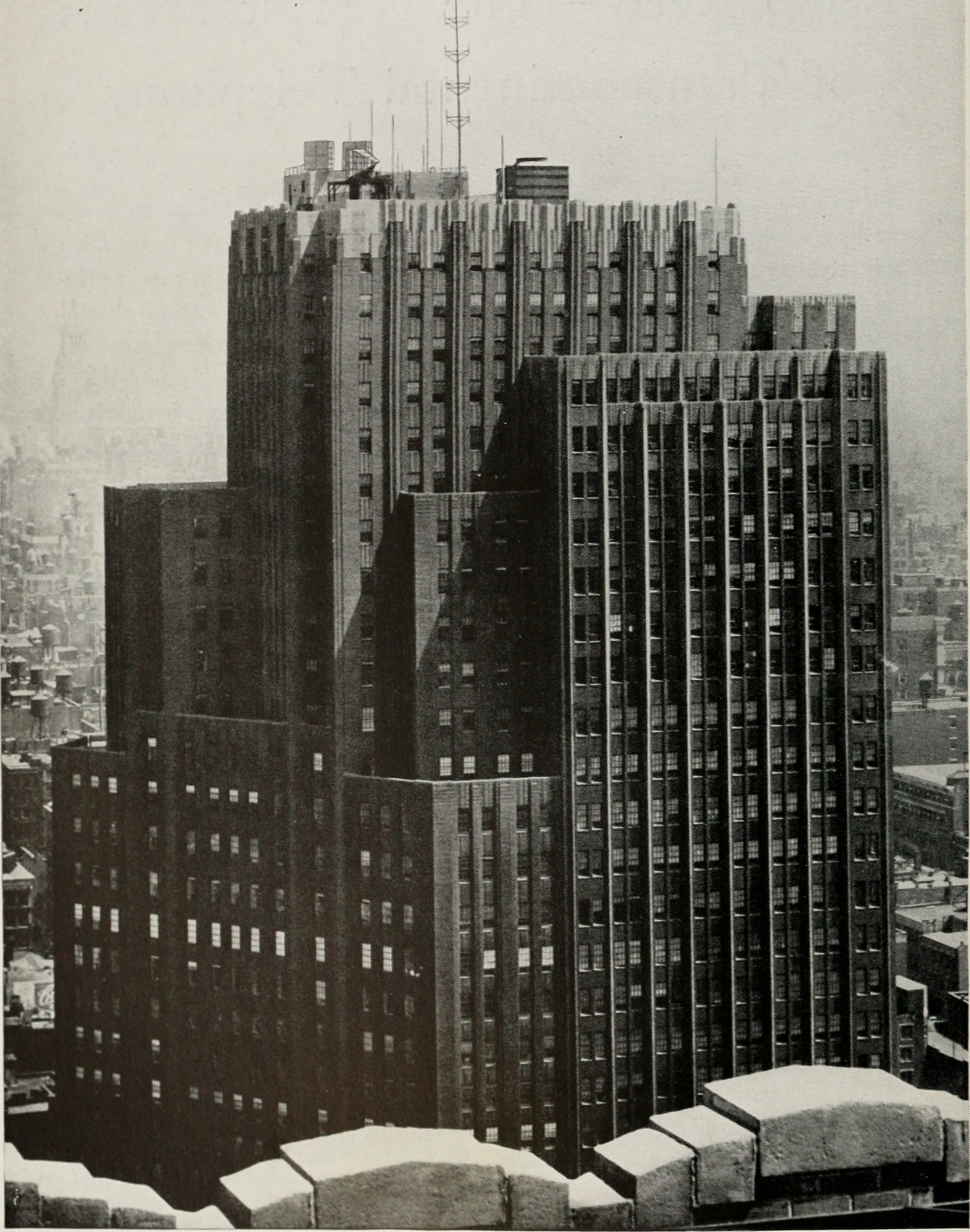
Approximately 1950

The surrounding area underwent multiple changes in the late 1920s and early 1930s that resulted in AT&T's acquisition of the entire block. The first change occurred in 1926, when the extension of Sixth Avenue southward from Greenwich Village was announced as a means to provide a more direct route for traffic to and from the Holland Tunnel. This occurred simultaneously with the construction of the Eighth Avenue subway under Church Street and Sixth Avenue. Starting in 1929, the entirety of Church Street was widened from 40 to 90 feet (12 to 27 m); the project necessitated the acquisition of properties on the western side of the street. These projects resulted in the demolition of the six properties on the eastern side of the block containing 24 Walker Street, as well as the westernmost third of the block, which was in the path of Sixth Avenue. The Sixth Avenue extension opened in 1930, and both street-widening projects and the subway were completed in 1932.

In August 1929, New York Telephone paid the city $300,000 for two lots along the eastern sidewalk of the Sixth Avenue extension. Voorhees, Gmelin & Walker—renamed from McKenzie, Voorhees & Gmelin—submitted plans for adding two 27-story annexes and a penthouse to 24 Walker Street in September 1929. The extensions would have a similar design to the existing structure and would take up the remainder of the block between Sixth Avenue and Walker, Lispenard, and Church Streets, except for a chamfer at the building's northwestern corner. The floor area would be more than doubled, from 400,000 to 812,000 square feet (37,200 to 75,400 m^{2}). The expansion was estimated to cost $6–7 million (equivalent to $113–131 million in 2025). This was part of a $600 million expansion plan that New York Telephone planned to undertake between 1930 and 1934.

Work started first on the western annex. The structures on that side were destroyed starting in April 1930 and the steel frame was being built by that October. The structures to the east were destroyed from February 1931, with erection of the steel structure starting that June. The facade of the original building was also modified. Workers started moving into the expanded AT&T Long Distance building in early 1932. The annexes' construction necessitated the relocation and addition of utility pipes, ventilation systems, plumbing systems, and power and telephone lines, while maintaining long-distance service throughout. After the completion of 24 Walker Street's annexes, its address was changed to 32 Sixth Avenue, (Note: Unlike with the extension of Seventh Avenue, which was given a different name and address system than the rest of the avenue, the extension of Sixth Avenue retained the same name and address system as the preexisting portion of the avenue. Since the avenue's address numbering system increased sequentially from south to north, all existing address numbers were increased by 300. Therefore, the address "32 Sixth Avenue" has also applied to addresses further north. Additionally, when Sixth Avenue was officially renamed Avenue of the Americas in 1945, the building's official address became 32 Avenue of the Americas.) and it became the world's largest long-distance communications hub. Several of the construction workers who helped work on the expansion were later given awards for craftsmanship.

=== Later years ===
==== 20th century ====
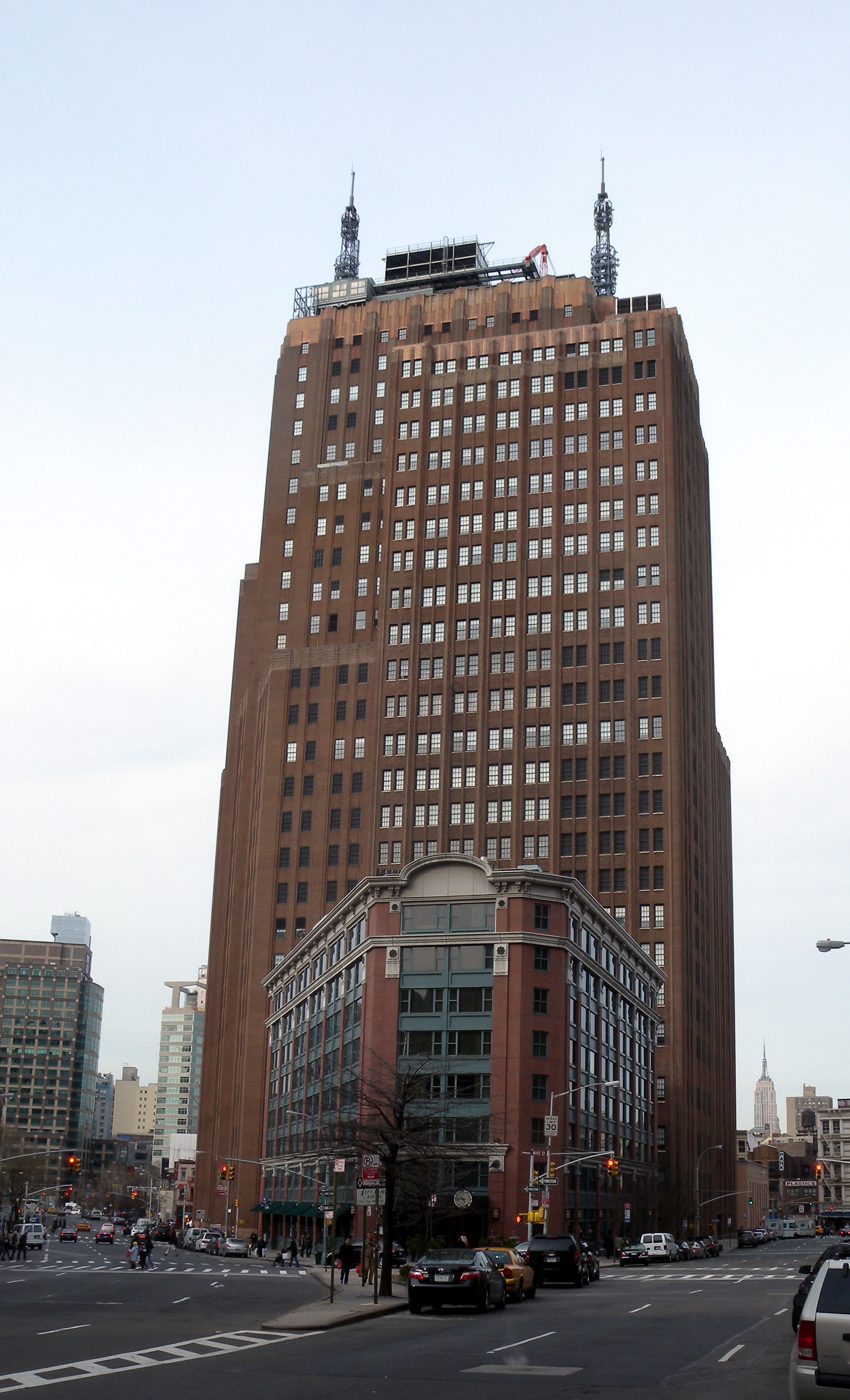
Viewed from Church and Franklin Streets

For much of the 20th century, the AT&T Long Distance Building remained largely unchanged, except for upgrades to equipment, and AT&T was the sole occupant of the building. The exteriors and ground-floor lobbies of 32 Avenue of the Americas and two other telecommunications buildings were designated city landmarks by the New York City Landmarks Preservation Commission (LPC) in 1991. (Note: The other buildings were the Barclay–Vesey Building at 140 West Street and the Western Union Building at 60 Hudson Street five blocks south.) An AT&T spokesperson said at the time, "We are pleased that the city has named it a landmark." The following year, when AT&T sold its headquarters at 550 Madison Avenue in Midtown Manhattan to Sony, (Note: AT&T had moved from 195 Broadway to 550 Madison Avenue in 1984.) AT&T moved its head offices to 32 Avenue of the Americas.

AT&T was considering selling off 32 Avenue of the Americas by 1999, and estimated that such a sale would gross $125–150 million, though it planned to lease back 30 to 40 percent of the space. The Rudin Management Company bought the structure from AT&T in 1999, paying about $150 million. AT&T kept 400,000 square feet (37,000 m^{2}), including its boardroom on the 25th floor, but the rest of the space was leased to other communications companies. Upon buying 32 Avenue of the Americas, Rudin Management planned to renovate the building into the New York Global Connectivity Center.

==== 21st century ====
By the September 11, 2001, attacks, the building was 75% occupied. Between 2001 and 2002, 32 Avenue of the Americas underwent an extensive renovation by the architecture firm of Fox & Fowle, which included the installation of new mechanical and communications infrastructure. Numerous features of the building's original design were restored, including the lobby. A quarter of the building's windows were replaced with louvers which emulated the pattern of the original sash windows. Two 120-foot-tall (37 m) communications masts were installed, increasing the building's height from 429 feet (131 m) to 549 feet (167 m). The LPC approved the telecommunications masts, stating that changes would be inevitable due to technological advances, although the commission said these changes would need to respect the building's existing architecture.

Following the renovations, about half of 32 Avenue of the Americas was leased to corporate clients, while the other half remained in use as a telecommunications facility. By 2006, it was almost fully occupied. The tenants included AT&T, Cogent Communications, iHeartMedia, Qwest, Cambridge University Press, Verizon, T-Mobile, TV Globo International, GloboNews, 360i, Bartle Bogle Hegarty, Tribeca Film Institute, Tribeca Film Festival, Stealth Communications, and New York University. The 24th floor of the building also houses a carrier-neutral, co-location and interconnection facility for communication providers known as The Hub. The facility is a convergent point for buyers and sellers of bandwidth; for over 50 terrestrial carriers, content providers, ISPs, and enterprise tenants. The ground floor houses the iHeartRadio Theater (originally the P. C. Richard & Son Theater), a 250-seat theater. Rudin Management took out a $425 million loan on the building in 2015.

By the 2020s, Rudin Management planned to expand the ground floor and renovate the ground-story facade, drawing opposition from local residents. A flexible office space on the 13th floor was completed in 2021, and the LPC approved a renovation of 32 Avenue of the Americas' lobby in September 2022. The next year, Marvel Architects proposed adding large glass windows at ground level, along with a pavilion at the northwest corner of the building; this plan faced community opposition. The building's occupancy had declined to 57% by June 2025; several tenants, including CenturyLink, Dentsu, and a subsidiary of iHeartMedia had moved out. The mortgage loan was sent to a special servicer that September. Though the building's loan was supposed to mature in November 2025, Rudin obtained a four-year loan extension, announcing plans to spend $100 million on upgrades.

== See also ==
- Art Deco architecture of New York City
- List of New York City Designated Landmarks in Manhattan below 14th Street
