= Voorhees, Gmelin and Walker =

American architectural firm

Voorhees, Gmelin and Walker was a New York architectural firm.

The parent company was founded in New York City by Cyrus L.W. Eidlitz in 1885. In 1900 he added partner Andrew C. McKenzie and when Eidlitz left the firm in 1910 he was replaced by Stephen F. Voorhees (1878–1965) and Paul Gmelin. Following McKenzie's death in 1926 Ralph Walker, who had been employed for several years with the company, was added as a partner and the name was changed to Voorhees, Gmelin and Walker. In 1938, reflecting new changes in the partnership, the name was changed to Voorhees, Walker, Foley and Smith, and in 1955 to Voorhes, Walker, Smith and Smith. Mr. Voorhees held a senior partner position until January 1959, when he became a consultant. Following Perry Coke Smith's retirement in 1968, the firm's name was changed to Haines Lundberg Waehler, and in its current form is known today as HLW.

The firm was well known for its Art Deco buildings.

== Notable commissions ==
The following are all in New York City unless otherwise noted:

- Justice Court Building, Glen Cove, New York
- Barclay–Vesey Building, 1920–1926
- 340 West 55th Street, originally the National Bible Institute School and Dormitory, 1922-1924
- New Jersey Bell Headquarters Building, Newark, New Jersey, 1929
- Times Square Building, Rochester, New York, 1929
- Salvation Army Headquarters, 120–130 West 14th Street (1929–1930)
- 60 Hudson Street, 1930
- 400 First Avenue, originally the Institute for the Crippled and Disabled, 1930
- 101 Willoughby Street, 1931
- 1 Wall Street (Irving Trust Company Building) 1932
- 32 Avenue of the Americas, 1932
- Bloomingdale's Fresh Meadows, Queens, opened 1949, closed 1991
- The Grace Rainey Rogers Auditorium inside The Metropolitan Museum of Art, 1954
- Chesapeake and Potomac Telephone Company Building, Washington, D.C.
