= Salvation Army Headquarters (Manhattan) =

Building in Manhattan, New York

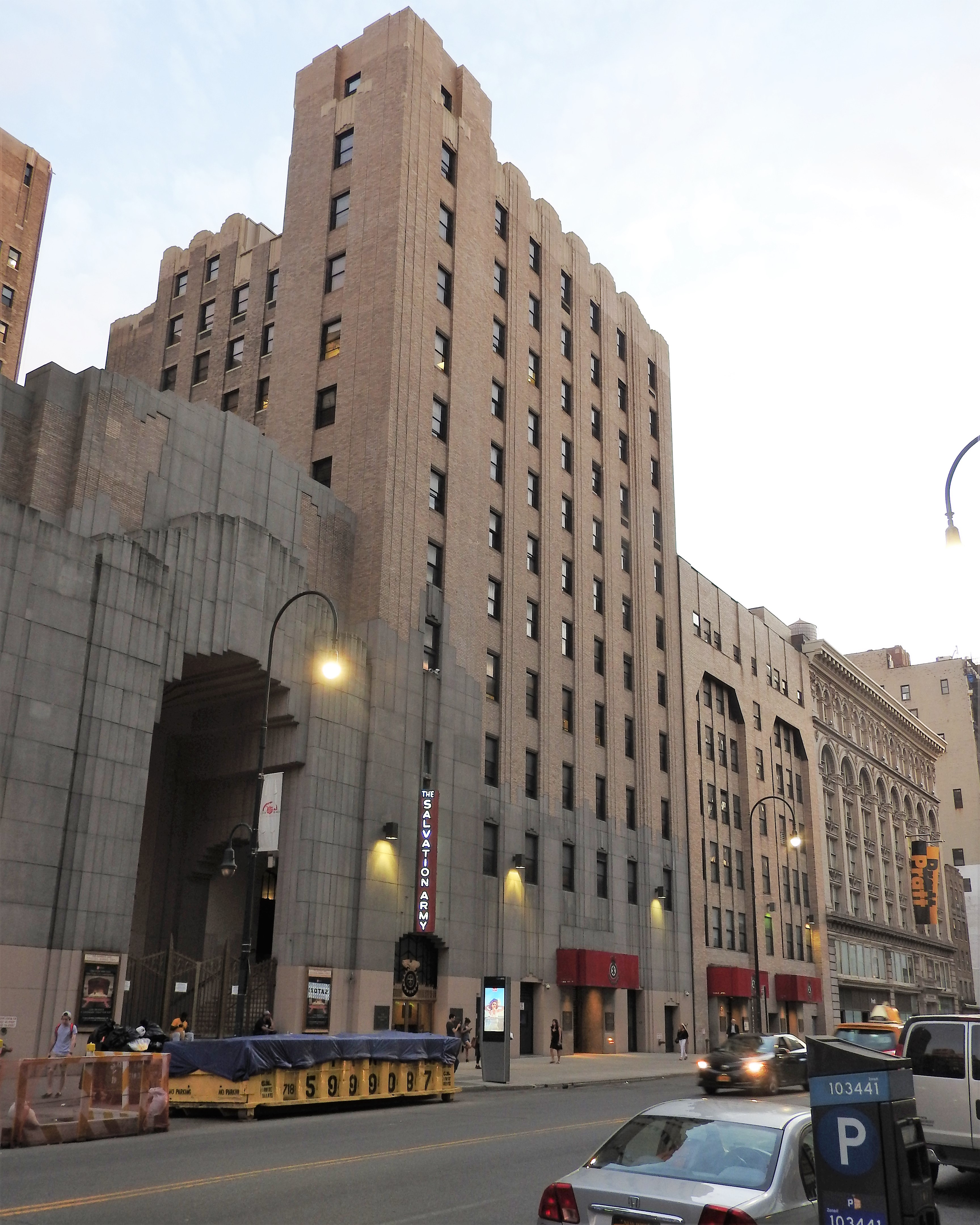
- The Salvation Army Headquarters seen from 14th Street
- Interactive map of the Salvation Army Headquarters area

General information
- Architectural style: Art Deco
- Location: 120–130 West 14th Street, Manhattan, New York, United States
- Coordinates: 40°44′16″N 73°59′54″W
- Years built: 1894–1895 (original structure); 1928–1930 (current buildings)
- Groundbreaking: August 15, 1894 (original structure); October 16, 1928 (Markle Evangeline dormitory); October 5, 1929 (auditorium and office building)
- Opened: June 4, 1895 (original structure); May 19, 1930 (auditorium and office building); June 14, 1930 (Markle Evangeline dormitory)
- Demolished: 1927 (original structure)
- Cost: $13,545,000 (original building) $48,182,271 (current buildings)
- Owner: The Salvation Army

Technical details
- Floor count: 4 (auditorium); 12 (office building); 17 (Markle Evangeline dormitory)

Design and construction
- Architect: Ralph Thomas Walker
- Architecture firm: Voorhees, Gmelin and Walker

Other information
- Public transit access: Subway: 14th Street/Sixth Avenue; PATH: 14th Street

New York City Landmark
- Designated: October 17, 2017
- Reference no.: 2565
- Designated entity: Facade

The Salvation Army Headquarters is a building at 120–130 West 14th Street in the Chelsea and Greenwich Village neighborhoods of Manhattan in New York City. The building, owned by charitable organization the Salvation Army, is composed of a four-story auditorium named the Centennial Memorial Temple, a 12-story office building, and a 17-story dormitory named the Markle Evangeline. All three sections were designed in the Art Deco style by Ralph Thomas Walker of Voorhees, Gmelin and Walker and were constructed from 1928 to 1930 as the headquarters for the Salvation Army. The auditorium and office building are also New York City designated landmarks.

The building contains a facade of cast stone and buff brick. The office wing on 14th Street is sparsely decorated, although Walker used brick and cast stone, as well as stepped archways, to create a textile-like appearance. East of the office wing is the Centennial Memorial Temple, with a triple-story opening whose design was intended to welcome visitors. The dormitory, in the rear of the building, contains setbacks to comply with the 1916 Zoning Resolution. The building's main auditorium had between 1,600 and 2,000 seats, while the dormitory had 220 rooms that were originally reserved for women. The building also had a recreation center and offices for the Salvation Army.

After the Salvation Army's cofounder Catherine Booth died in 1890, members decided to build a New York City headquarters in her honor. Catherine Booth's son Ballington Booth acquired land on 14th Street in 1893 and hired Gilbert A. Schellenger to design an eight-story headquarters, which was officially dedicated in June 1895. The Salvation Army also added a women's home at the rear of the building in December 1900. In its early years, the building hosted various programs and events, causing the existing headquarters to become overcrowded by the 1920s. Walker designed a new headquarters for the structure, which was built in stages from October 1928 to June 1930. The new building was the Salvation Army's national headquarters until 1981 and was a regional headquarters until 1990. The Salvation Army continued to use the structure to host events and renovated the building in the early 21st century.

== Site ==
The Salvation Army Headquarters building is located at 120–130 West 14th Street, on the southern sidewalk between Sixth and Seventh Avenues, in the Chelsea and Greenwich Village neighborhoods of Manhattan in New York City. The land lot covers 26,122 square feet (2,426.8 m^{2}) and is irregular in shape, stretching through the block to 13th Street. The building has frontage of 150 ft (46 m) on 14th Street, with a depth of 200 feet (61 m); only the eastern portion of the lot extends south to 13th Street. The Salvation Army Headquarters shares the block with 144 West 14th Street (the Pratt Institute School of Information) and 154 West 14th Street to the west. In addition, entrances to the New York City Subway's 14th Street/Sixth Avenue station and the PATH's 14th Street station are east of the building.

The Salvation Army had developed its first building on the site in the 1890s, at which time the adjacent stretch of 14th Street was largely commercial. At the time of the original building's opening, 14th Street was a busy entertainment district with many theaters, hotels, and stores. The building formerly faced a New York Army National Guard armory across 14th Street, prompting The New York Times to write that "two rather different military groups face each other across the busy street".

== Architecture ==
The Salvation Army Headquarters consists of a four-story auditorium and 11-story office building on 14th Street, as well as a 17-story dormitory on 13th Street. All three buildings were designed by the firm of Voorhees, Gmelin and Walker for the Salvation Army, a charitable organization, in the Art Deco style. Ralph Walker of that firm was largely responsible for the design. According to architect and historian Robert A. M. Stern, the building's design signified a "refinement" of his tendency to use Dutch and German Expressionist elements in his structures.

=== Form and facade ===
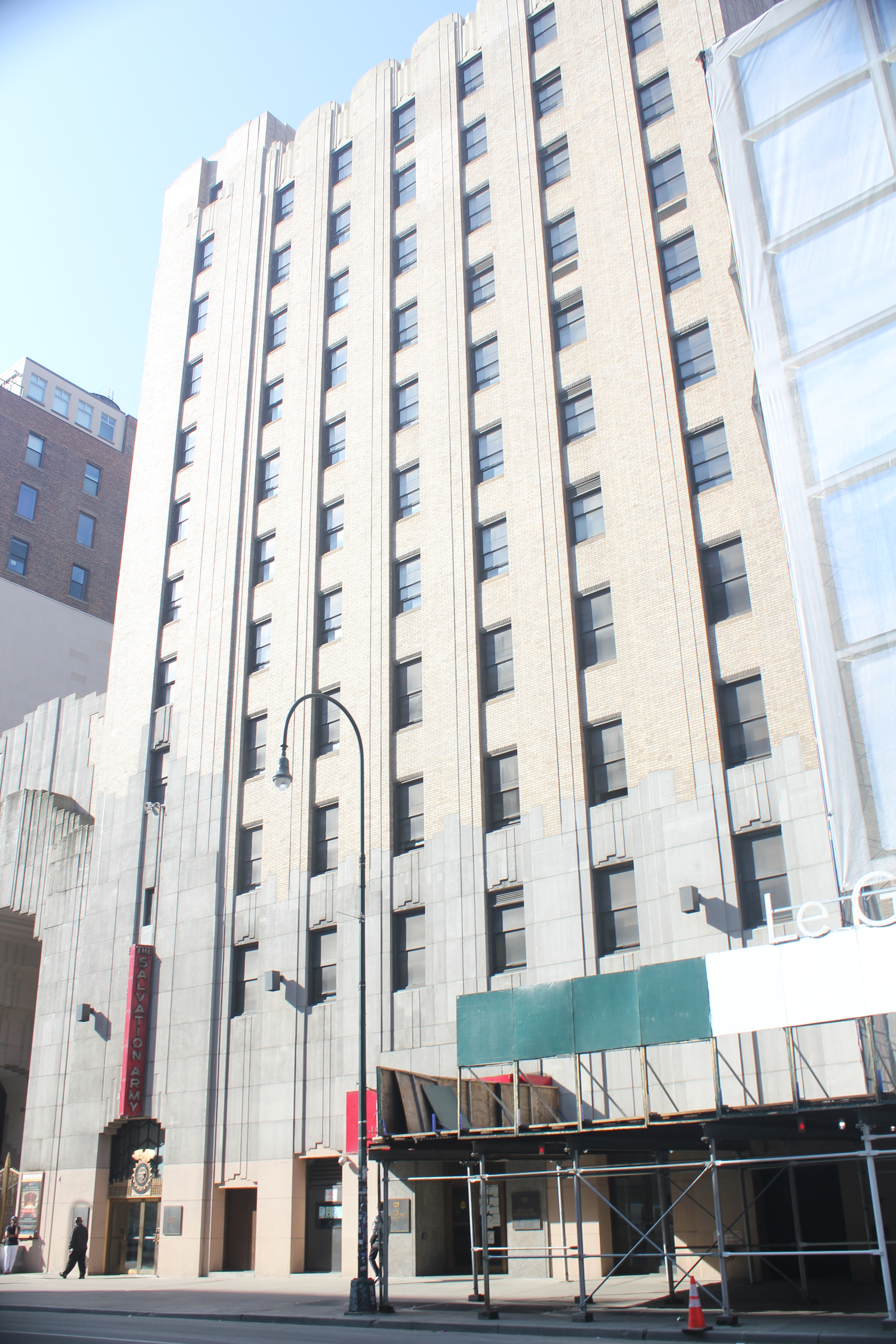
The office wing

The office wing on the northwestern corner of the site is sparsely decorated, deriving much of its ornamentation from the treatment of the brick and stone surfaces. Walker used brick and cast stone layers, as well as stepped archways, to create a textile-like appearance. The office facade is divided vertically into seven bays by stepped piers. The facade is clad with cast stone up to the third story, except in the easternmost bay, where the cast stone rises to the fourth story. At ground level are six doorways. In the third and fourth bays from the west is an entrance with three glass and metal doors, surrounded by a granite frame and topped by an awning. Another entrance, with four glass and metal doors, is in the easternmost (leftmost) bay. The top of the entrance contains a grille with an eagle sculpture, and there is a vertical sign and three flagpoles above the doorway. On the upper stories, the facade is made of brick. Most of the window openings are one-over-one aluminum sash windows, which replaced the original windows in the 1970s; some of the openings contain ventilation grilles. Though most of the building is 11 stories high, the northeast corner rises an additional story.

East of the office wing is the auditorium, known as the Centennial Memorial Temple. Its facade consists primarily of a three-story-high stepped opening, which was intended to welcome visitors. At the bottom of the opening, a set of wide stairs ascends to a bronze gate, and there is a display board on either side of the steps. The rear wall of the opening contains the Salvation Army's insignia, below which are bronze letters. The ceiling of this opening contains recessed spotlights. There are doorways on the left and right walls, which lead to the auditorium's main level and balcony. To the east, or left, of the opening is another entrance on 14th Street, which a double door made of glass and metal. The auditorium facade is largely made of layered cast stone. The top of the facade is stepped and is made of brick with a stone parapet. The roof contains heating, ventilation, and air conditioning systems.

On 13th Street, there is a 17-story dormitory for women, known as the Markle Evangeline. The dormitory, originally known as the John and Mary R. Markle Memorial, contains setbacks to comply with the 1916 Zoning Resolution.

=== Features ===
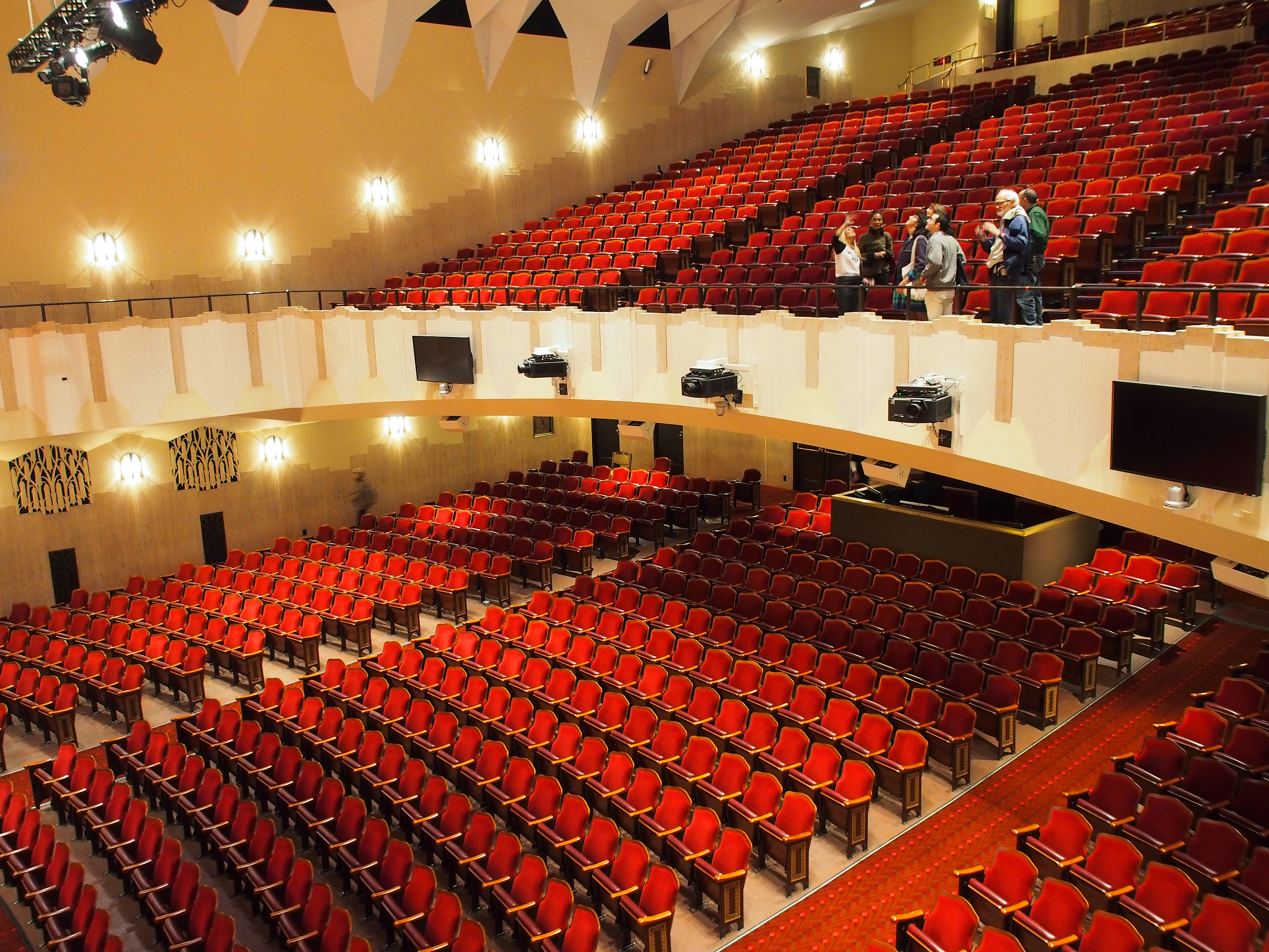
Interior of the Centennial Memorial Temple

The building's main auditorium had either 1,600, 1,700, or 2,000 seats. The seats are spread across a main level and a balcony in the rear. The primary decorative feature of the auditorium was its ceiling, which had faceted shapes as well as grilles for illumination. The main auditorium also contains a large pipe organ, which was manufactured by the Estey Organ Company and was salvaged from the Salvation Army's first building on the site, completed in 1895. The building also contained a secondary auditorium with 500 seats. (Note: Landmarks Preservation Commission 2017, p. 14, states that both auditoriums had a combined capacity of 1,800.) There were multiple meeting rooms in the basement. The main building also had a recreation center with several game rooms, a 64-by-100-foot (20 by 30 m) gymnasium, a 60-by-40-foot (18 by 12 m) swimming pool.

The women's dormitory originally contained 220 rooms, which could fit more than 300 women per night. There were dining rooms, laundry rooms, a gymnasium, and a swimming pool in the dormitory. When the women's dormitory was completed in 1930, it catered to women below the age of 35 with weekly salaries of no more than $35. By the 2010s, the dormitory had 199 rooms and catered to a wider range of women between the ages of 18 and 50.

== History ==
The Salvation Army was founded in London by William Booth and his wife Catherine Booth in 1865. Over the years, the Salvation Army expanded outside the United Kingdom to other countries, including the United States. The Salvationists, as the Salvation Army's adherents were known, formed a New York City outpost at the intersection of Bedford Street and Christopher Street in Greenwich Village, known as "Fort Salvation", in 1882. The Salvation Army's growing U.S. operations prompted the organization to open a new headquarters on State Street in Lower Manhattan during the late 19th century. William and Catherine Booth's second-oldest son Ballington Booth, along with Ballington's wife Maud Charlesworth, began managing the Salvation Army's U.S. operations in 1887. The next year, the Salvation Army moved to 111 Reade Street, which by the early 1890s was cramped.

=== Original buildings ===
==== Construction and opening ====
After Catherine Booth died in 1890, American Salvationists began raising money for the construction of a regional headquarters in her honor. Ballington Booth acquired an approximately 75-by-100-foot (23 by 30 m) site at 120–124 West 14th Street in March 1893 to erect a six-story building dedicated to his mother. Ballington also bought an approximately 25-by-100-foot (7.6 by 30.5 m) lot on 13th Street, connected to the 14th Street site by a trapezoidal gore. At the time, the Salvation Army occupied a barracks on part of the 14th Street lot. In May 1894, Gilbert A. Schellenger completed plans for an eight-story headquarters building for the Salvation Army, which was published in The War Cry magazine two months later. A groundbreaking ceremony for the headquarters began on June 28. 1894, and the cornerstone of the original 14th Street building was laid on August 15, 1894. The building was expected to cost $120,000, excluding the $200,000 cost of the land. That November, Ballington Booth received a $200,000 mortgage from the Dime Savings Bank of New York to fund the building's construction.

The Salvation Army's first 14th Street building formally opened with a two-day ceremony on June 4, 1895, as the headquarters of the Salvation Army in the United States. The headquarters had cost $350,000 in total (equivalent to $13,545,000 in 2025), with the building itself having cost $150,000. The building itself was designed in the Romanesque Revival style and evoked a military fortification, with a central tower flanked by turrets. The lower stories were clad in gray stone, while the upper stories were made of buff brick. The central entrance was through a stone-framed wooden door with turrets and insignia, as well as a balcony above it. The entrance led to an entrance hall, stores, a meeting room, stairs, and elevators on the ground floor. The upper stories were used as offices. There was also a lecture room on the ground floor and a 2,800-seat auditorium on the second and fifth floors. According to historian Diane Winston, the new structure was intended to be a "stronghold and staging ground" for the Salvation Army.

In its early years, the building held events such as the Salvation Army's National Congress, as well as loud concerts that prompted complaints from residents. Ballington and Maud Booth split from the Salvation Army in early 1896 after a dispute over whether the Booths should mortgage the headquarters to raise money for the Salvation Army's overseas operations. They formed a splinter group—God's American Volunteers, later Volunteers of America—to attract Salvationists. Ballington ultimately handed over ownership of the building to his sister Emma Booth-Tucker and brother-in-law Frederick Booth-Tucker in May 1896. By the end of the decade, the Salvation Army had already outgrown its new headquarters. The building contained a shoe store, tailoring department, millinery room, printing plant, engraving room, photography studio, and general store for Salvation Army merchandise.

==== Early 20th century ====
The Salvation Army opened a women's home at 127 West 13th Street in December 1900. This dormitory could shelter up to 15 women at once. Under the Booth-Tuckers' tenure, the Salvation Army expanded its services and outreach programs for the needy. The organization also operated a training school in a building just west of its 14th Street headquarters. William and Catherine Booth's youngest child, Evangeline Booth, began leading the Salvation Army in the United States in 1904. After the Salvation Army failed to pay taxes on the 14th Street property, the city government sold the building at auction to I. Roth in June 1905. Meanwhile, the Salvation Army had reorganized its American operations during the early 20th century, forming the Western and Eastern territories in 1907; the Eastern Territory was headquartered at the 14th Street building.

Around 1907, the Salvation Army acquired the neighboring Douglas-Cruger Mansion, a 75-foot-wide (23 m) building whose facade was dominated by a large flight of stairs. The house had previously served as a residence for members of the Roosevelt family, galleries for the Metropolitan Museum of Art, and a saloon and banquet hall. This structure became the Salvation Army's training school and later also contained the printing department and staff headquarters. The architect William S. Barker filed plans in 1910 for alterations to the headquarters building's interior. With the growth of the Salvation Army's operations, the organization could no longer fit all its offices in the 14th Street headquarters. As such, the Salvation Army bought additional structures on 13th and 14th Streets from 1913 to 1923. The three-story training school at 126–128 West 14th Street burned down in February 1918, killing two people. Shortly afterward, Barker was rehired to redesign the training school as a four-story structure. The Salvation Army opened the Red Shield Club for Service Men at 128 West 14th Street in February 1919, after that structure was rebuilt.

The 14th Street building was the headquarters of the Eastern Territory until 1920, when the Salvation Army created a Metropolitan Division for New York City-related activities. By then, a New York Times reporter wrote that the Salvation Army Headquarters had "meetings, drills, addresses, receptions, a night refuge, food for the poor, clothes for the needy, a nursery for children, a community store, a newspaper office (The War Cry) and an inquiry department for missing persons". The Salvation Army considered relocating, but it ultimately decided to erect a new structure on the site, since 14th Street was close to numerous modes of transit. The organization ruled out the possibility of expanding the existing headquarters because it would cost about the same as an entirely new structure, but the new structure would be easier to plan than an alteration of the existing premises. The servicemen's building at 128 West 14th Street again burned down in March 1925. The Salvation Army, which was already contemplating redevelopment of the site, decided to tear down 128 West 14th Street entirely; that structure was razed in 1926.

=== Replacement buildings ===
==== Construction and opening ====
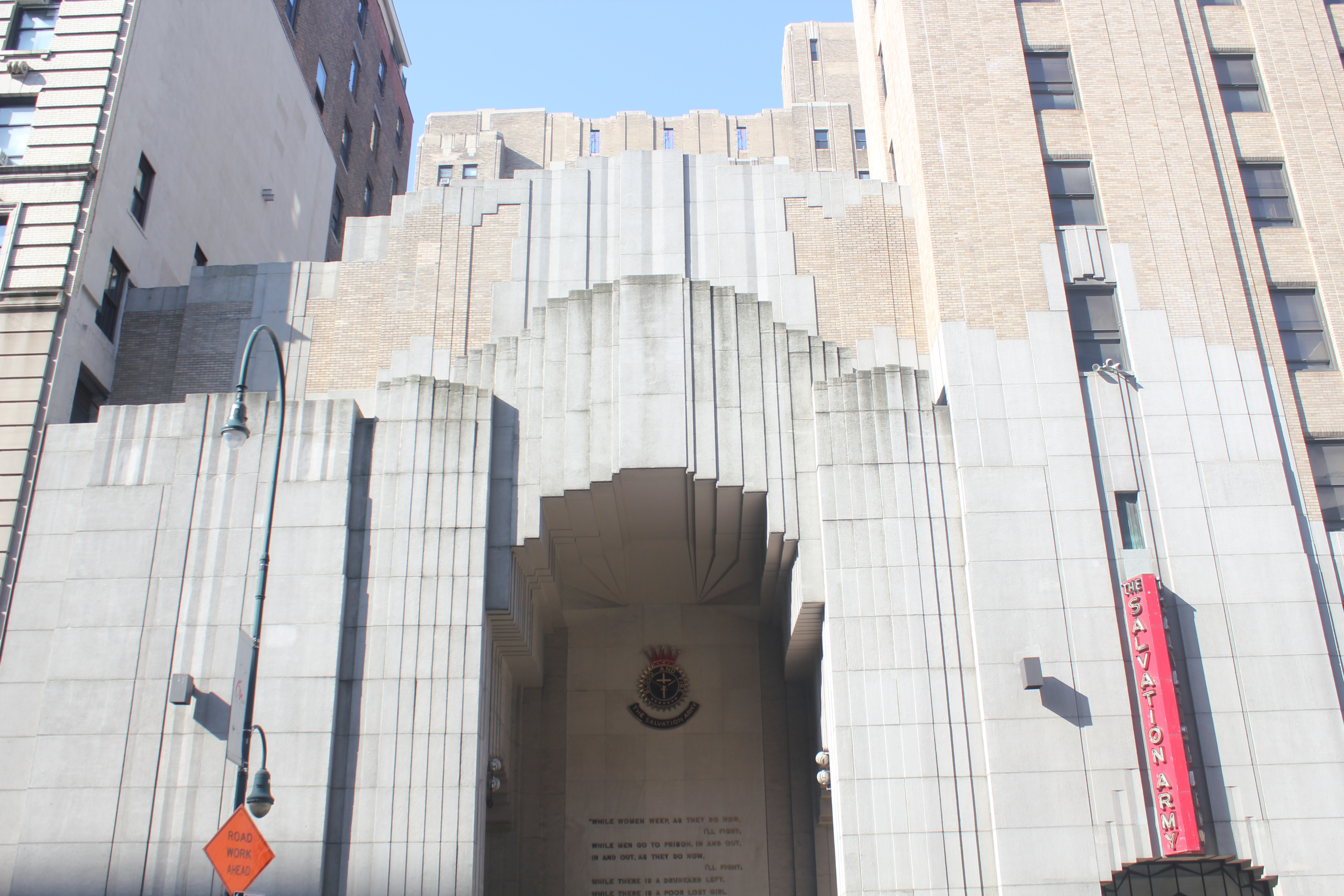
Entrance to the Centennial Memorial Temple

Evangeline Booth announced in November 1927 that she planned to replace the existing headquarters buildings with a new headquarters on 14th Street, as well as a 400-bed dormitory on 13th Street. This building was planned to cost $2 million. The announcement came shortly after Evangeline had returned from a Salvation Army meeting in London. The organization hired Voorhees, Gmelin & Walker to design the new headquarters; the firm had experience in designing large structures, and one of its principal architects, Stephen Voorhees, headed one of the Salvation Army's campaigns. According to historian Kathryn Holliday, the Salvation Army wished to create "a new symbol of its positive impact on the city while minimizing its costs”. As such, Voorhees, Gmelin & Walker waived the eight percent fee that they usually charged for architectural commissions.

The philanthropist John Markle gave the Salvation Army $500,000 in early 1928, which was to fund the construction of the women's dormitory. Markle and Evangeline Booth attended a groundbreaking ceremony for the women's dormitory, known as the John and Mary Markle Memorial Home, on October 16, 1928. A few days later, workers began demolishing several row houses on 13th Street to make way for the dormitory. The Salvation Army held its last weekend meeting at the old headquarters on November 19, 1928, and temporarily relocated to 248 West 14th Street. The headquarters was officially closed four days later, November 23, with a dinner banquet. The Amsterdam Building Company received the general contract for the new structure's construction the same month. The printing plant, tailoring division, millinery department, and other operations were transferred to a seven-story building on 321 West 13th Street, two blocks away, in March 1929. During the construction of the replacement headquarters in mid-1929, part of the site caved in, killing one worker.

A groundbreaking ceremony for the new headquarters on 122 West 14th Street was held on October 5, 1929, within the incomplete auditorium. By early 1930, the Salvation Army was seeking $300,000 to complete the auditorium at its new headquarters. The new building was dedicated on May 19, 1930; it had cost over $2.5 million to erect (equivalent to $48,182,271 in 2025). The new headquarters was originally known as the Centennial Memorial Temple, in honor of Evangeline Booth's parents. The opening coincided with the 50th anniversary of the Salvationists' arrival to the U.S.; the Salvation Army hosted a week of celebratory events, including a march at Battery Park where the first American Salvationists had entered the country. The women's dormitory on 13th Street was dedicated the next month, on June 14, 1930. At the dormitory's dedication, James A. Hearn & Son donated $3,000 toward the construction of a roof garden atop the dormitory. The roof garden of the Markle Memorial Home was dedicated that August, and the recreation rooms opened that November.

==== Mid-20th century ====
The new headquarters had opened amid the Great Depression, when the Salvation Army was providing shelter and hundreds of thousands of free meals annually at its shelters. By 1935, the Memorial Hotel adjacent to the headquarters served 12,000 meals and sheltered 2,200 people annually. The Salvationists unveiled a bronze plaque dedicated to Evangeline Booth at the Centennial Memorial Temple in 1936. By World War II, the Centennial Memorial Temple was directing the organization's activities in 11 states. Toward the end of the war, the Salvation Army Headquarters contained an office for veterans who wanted job assistance and legal help. Due to growing demand, the Salvation Army opened a veterans' psychiatric clinic across the street in February 1945. The organization also operated a Vocational Guidance Bureau in the Centennial Memorial Temple.

The Salvation Army continued to provide services for the needy following World War II and continuing into the 1950s, although it modified some programs to accommodate evolving needs. During that time, the organization ran hospitals, rehabilitation centers, children's homes, children's camps, adults' guidance centers, programs for single mothers, and rehabilitation centers. The Centennial Memorial Temple also hosted events such as annual induction ceremonies for Salvation Army "cadets". The Salvation Army moved its Temple Corps in 1977 to a new community center next door at 132–136 West 14th Street.

==== Relocation of headquarters ====
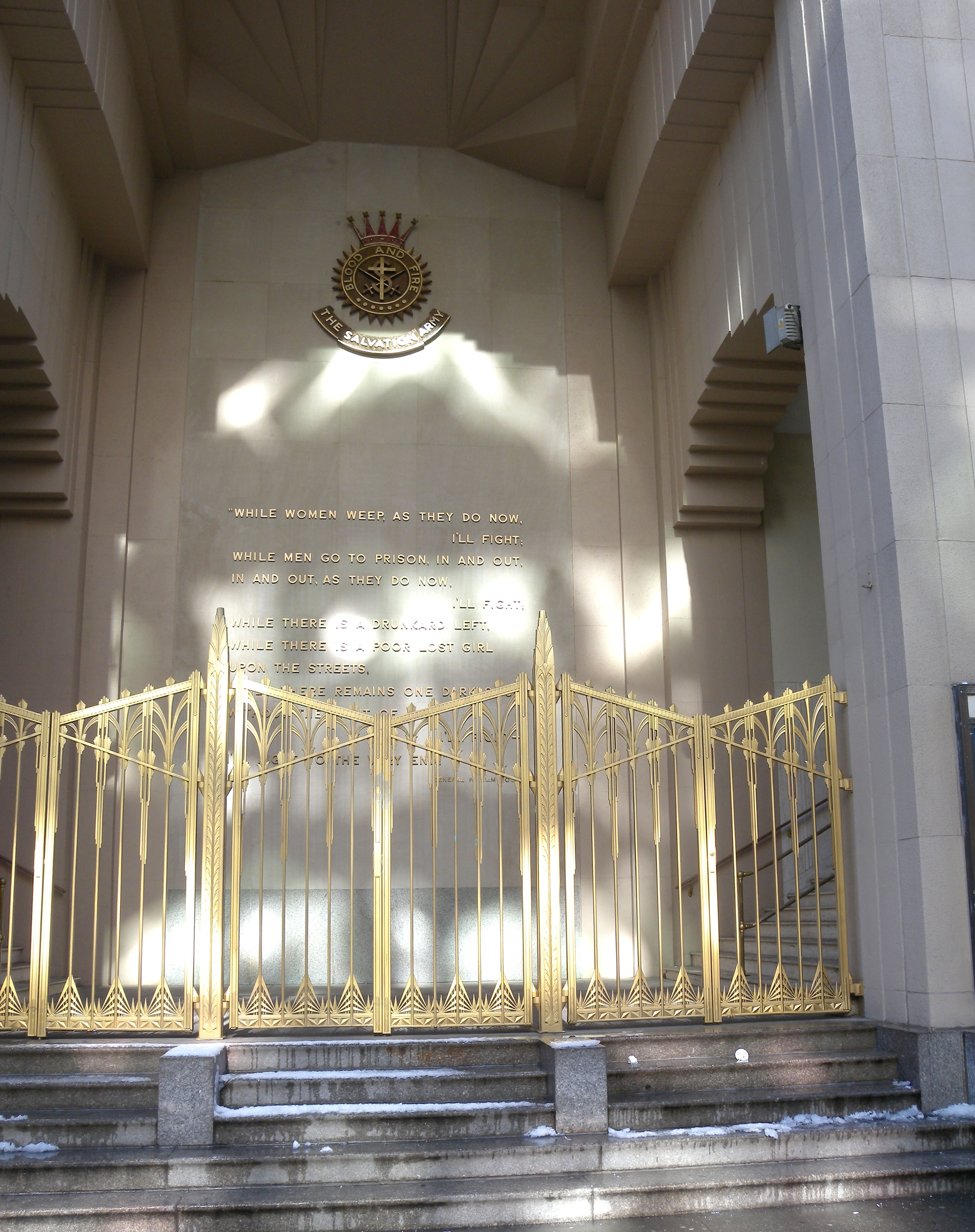
Centennial Memorial Temple gate

The Salvation Army announced in 1981 that it would relocate its national headquarters, as well as the publications and information services at 132–136 West 14th Street, to Verona, New Jersey. The move, which involved relocating about 50 employees, allowed the organization to reduce costs and combine all of the national headquarters' operations into a single building. After the national headquarters moved in January 1982, the 14th Street building continued to house the headquarters of the Salvation Army's Eastern Division. The New York City Landmarks Preservation Commission (LPC) began considering designating the building as a city landmark the same year. During this era, the Salvation Army continued to operate the women's residence at 123 West 13th Street. By January 1989, the Salvation Army was considering relocating the headquarters of its Eastern Division to Nyack, New York. The organization purchased a building in Nyack at the end of that year and moved its Eastern Division headquarters to Nyack in September 1990.

The LPC held hearings in 1990 to determine whether the Salvation Army Headquarters should be designated as a city landmark. The Salvation Army opposed the designation, saying that the structure was not one of Voorhees, Gmelin & Walker's most prominent designs and that more prominent buildings by the firm had not been designated as landmarks. Ultimately, the building was not designated as a landmark and instead was added to the LPC's backlog of unreviewed buildings. During the 1990s, the Salvation Army Headquarters building continued to host events such as League of Mercy visitation services and Thanksgiving dinners. The Salvation Army's Greater New York Division continued to use the building as a local headquarters, and it provided temporary housing and a social services center at the structure. The Centennial Memorial Temple also hosted various events, such as speeches and concerts.

The women's residence on 13th Street, the Markle Evangeline, was one of the few remaining women's residences in Manhattan by the beginning of the 21st century. The Salvation Army renovated the structure from 2008 to 2013. Madelyn Biggs, a former resident of the Markle Residence, donated $1 million to the Salvation Army in 2011; the donation was intended to help fund a renovation and endowment for the dormitory. The LPC again considered designating the Salvation Army Headquarters as a city landmark in 2014. Salvation Army officials again opposed the designation, saying that it would detract from the organization's charitable activities. Part of the headquarters was designated as a city landmark in October 2017. The designation only included the auditorium and office building on 14th Street, not the dormitory on 13th Street, which was part of the Greenwich Village Historic District.

By the early 2020s, the Markle Evangeline had started to accept male residents, though it remained in use as a dormitory. The Salvation Army hired Bellet Construction to restore the main building's facade in 2022.

== Critical reception ==
When the original building was finished, the Architectural Record criticized it, saying: "To construct a building for the uses of the Salvation Army is undoubtedly to incur a strong temptation to perpetrate an architectural aberration." In particular, the magazine wrote negatively about the dull colors of the facade, as well as the inclusion of military-inspired decorations such as the parapet and central entrance. By contrast, The New York Times said the structure was "a cross between a skyscraping office building and an armory" and wrote that "the ugliness of both" styles combined to form a structure that was "architecturally quite pleasing". Diane Winston, the author of a book on the Salvation Army's history, described the building as looking like "a mighty fortress, an apt materialization of God's kingdom". The journalist David W. Dunlap wrote that the old building was like "a medieval citadel".

After the headquarters was rebuilt in 1930, War Cry magazine wrote that the building was "architecturally beautiful... with simplicity and harmony of proportions, in a style that was called 'nontraditional'". Architectural writer W. Parker Chase said the headquarters comprised "a group of grand new buildings". A critic for The New Yorker wrote of the auditorium and office building: "This combination of ordinarily unrelated elements is finely and frankly expressed on the principal elevation on Fourteenth Street." Dunlap described the newer building's auditorium as having "a grand entry arch framed by curtain-like folds", while Robert A. M. Stern wrote that the auditorium entrance was "a heavenly triumphal arch transformed into the ribbed, ziggurat forms of Modern Naturalism". Kathryn Holliday stated that the inclusion of stepped surfaces, cast stone, and cast metal was similar to Walker's earlier design for the Barclay–Vesey Building.

== See also ==
- Art Deco architecture of New York City
- List of New York City Designated Landmarks in Manhattan below 14th Street
