= Ralph Thomas Walker =

American architect

- Born: Ralph Thomas Walker; November 28, 1889; Waterbury, Connecticut, U.S.
- Died: January 17, 1973 (aged 83); Chappaqua, New York, U.S.
- Education: Massachusetts Institute of Technology
- Occupation: Architect
- Employer: McKenzie, Voorhees, Gmelin
- Spouse(s): Stella Forbes and Christine Foulds

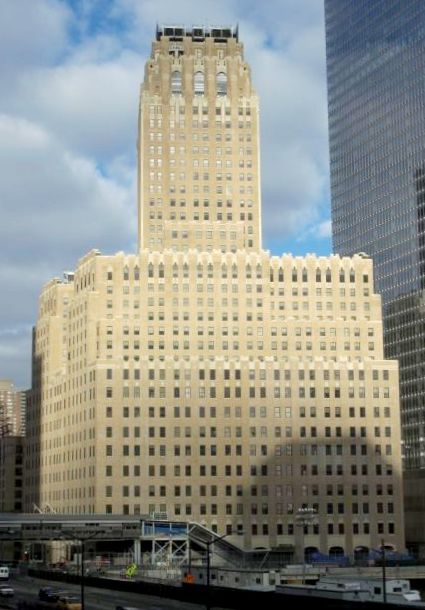
The Barclay–Vesey Building

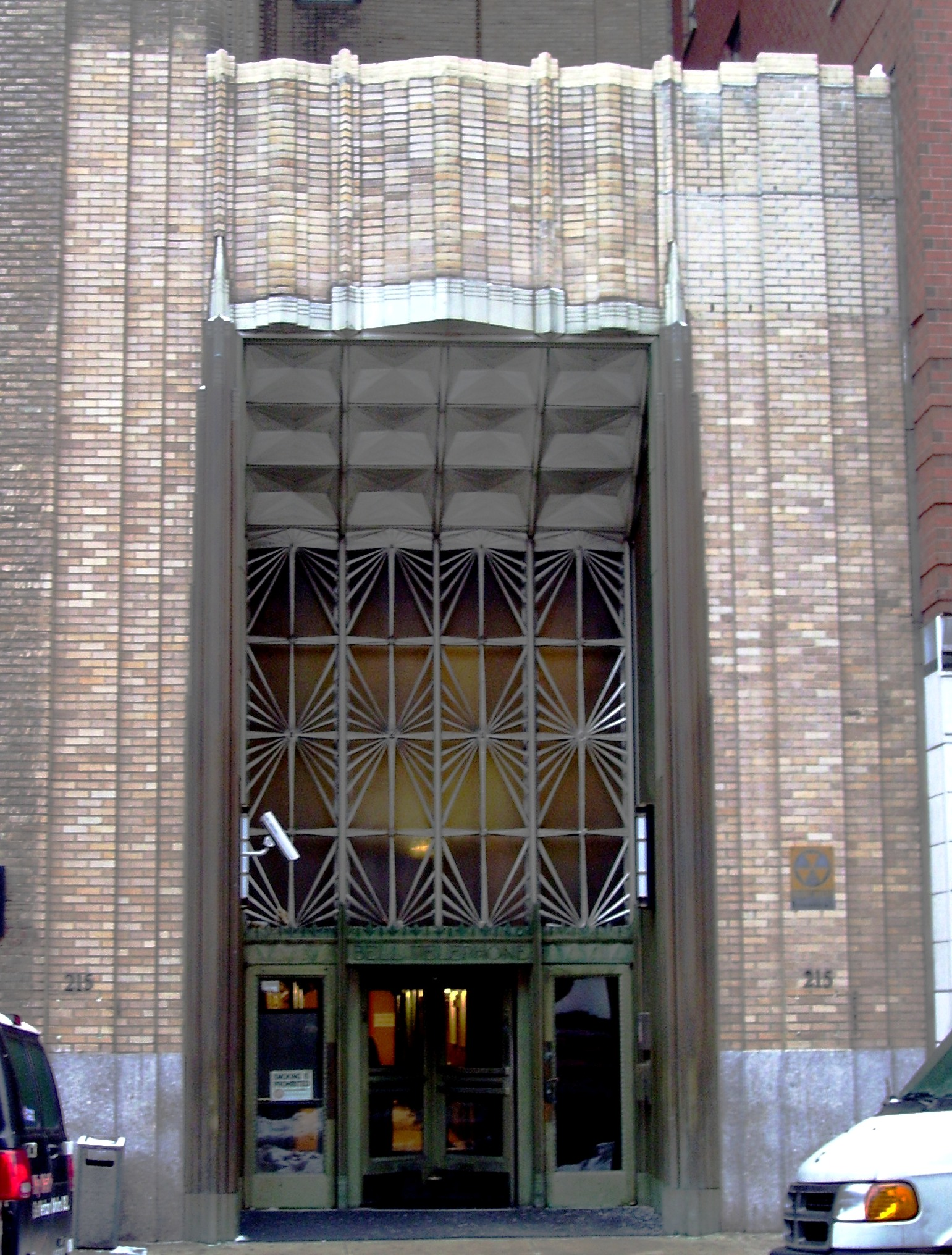
17th Street entrance to the Verizon Building in the Chelsea neighborhood of Manhattan, now being redeveloped for residential use under the name "Walker Tower"

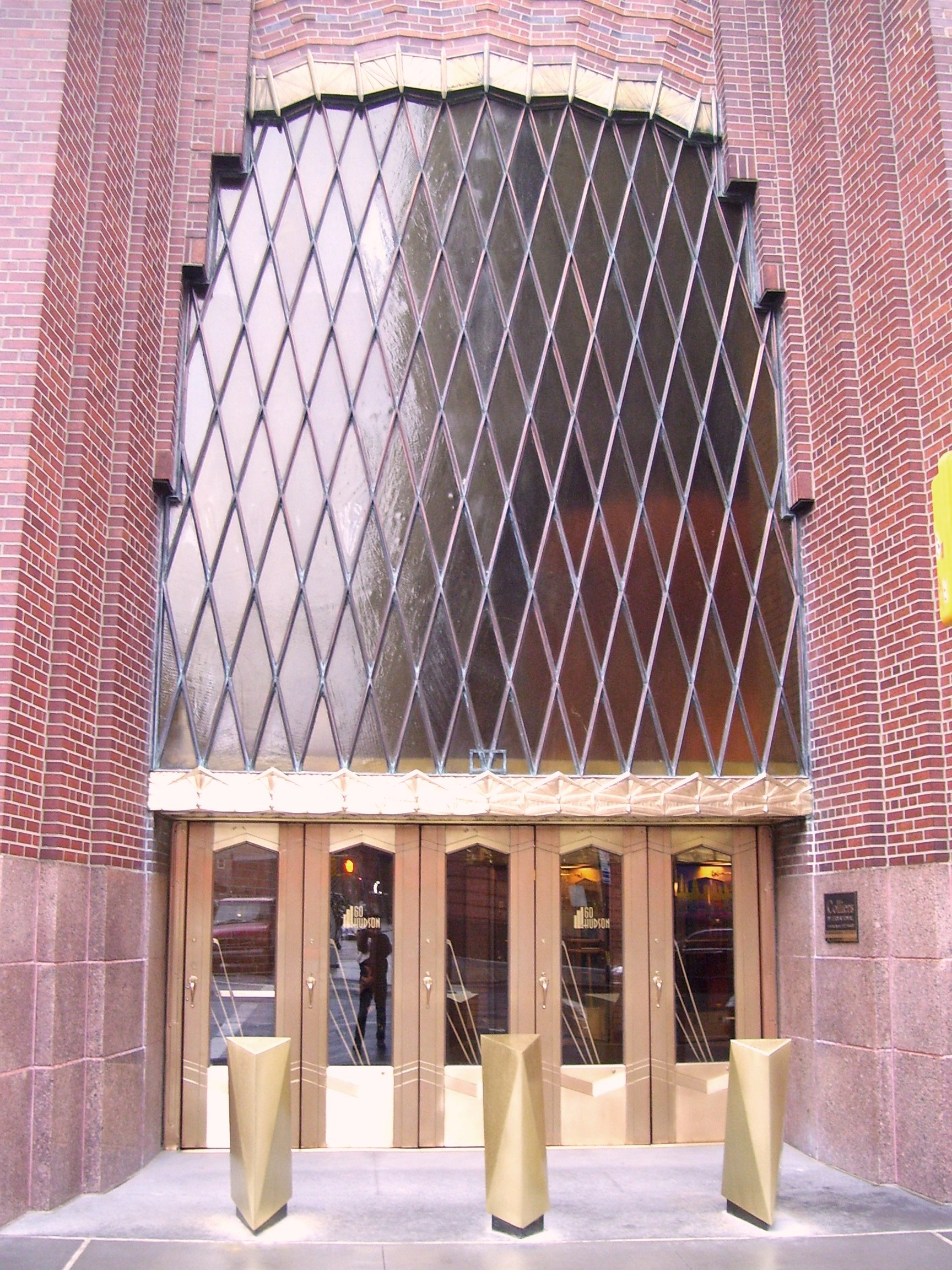
Entrance to 60 Hudson Street

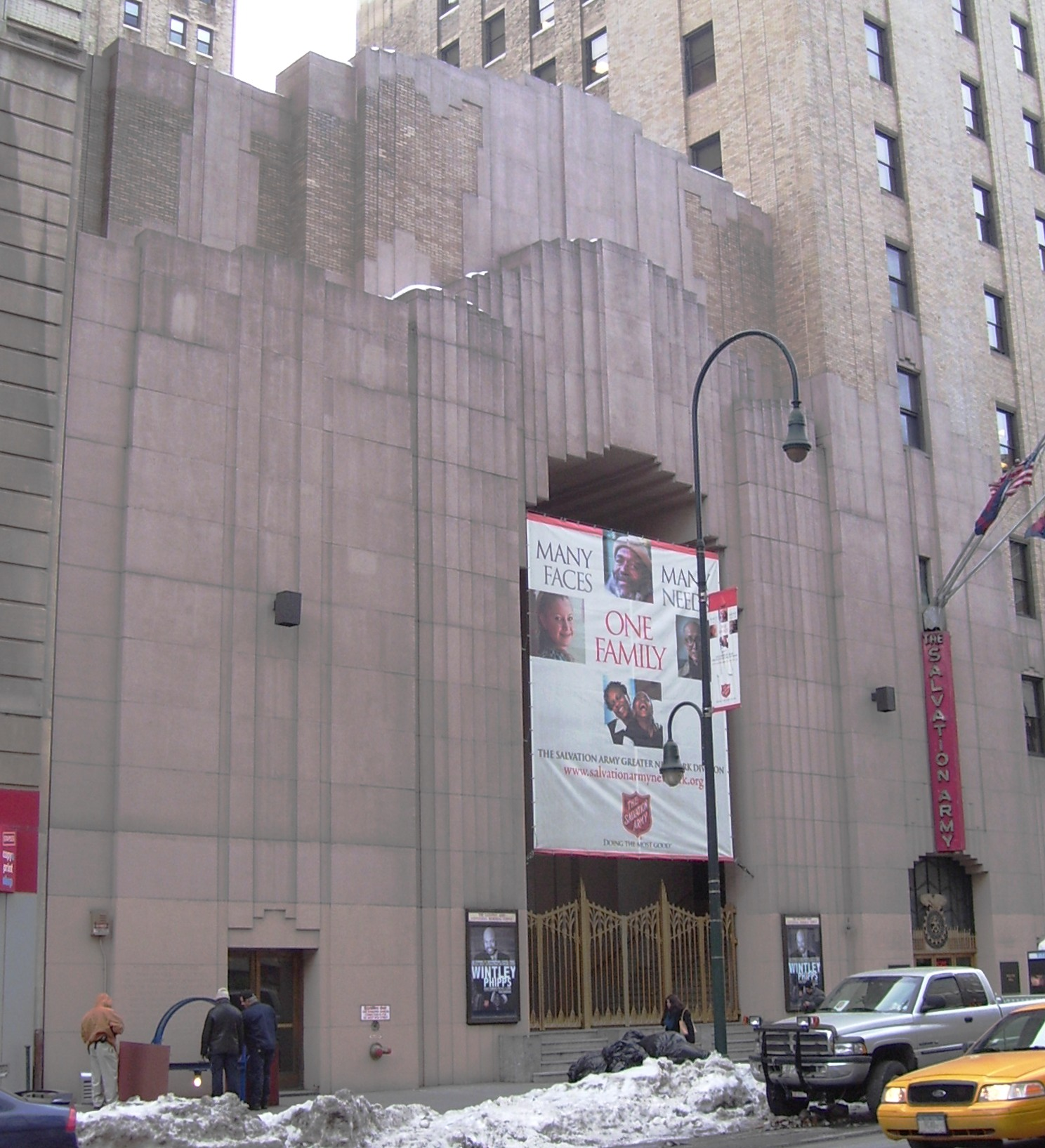
Salvation Army Centennial Memorial Temple

Ralph Thomas Walker FAIA (November 28, 1889 – January 17, 1973) was an American architect, president of the American Institute of Architects and partner of the firm McKenzie, Voorhees, Gmelin and its successor firms Voorhees, Gmelin and Walker; Voorhees, Walker, Foley & Smith; Voorhees, Walker, Smith & Smith; and Voorhees, Walker, Smith, Smith & Haines (now known as HLW). Walker is best known for his designs for the Barclay–Vesey Building (1922–26) and 1 Wall Street (1928–31), but was also involved in numerous other Art Deco telecommunications buildings in the New York City area.

Walker was called "The only other honest architect in America" by Frank Lloyd Wright, and "Architect of the Century" by The New York Times when he received the Centennial Medal of Honor from the American Institute of Architects. His Art Deco designs have been called "bold, spectacularly dynamic", "radical", "distinctive", "theatrical ... very dramatic", "syncopated and jazzy".

== Early life and career ==
Walker was born on November 28, 1889, in Waterbury, Connecticut, and was raised in Connecticut and Rhode Island by a working-class family. His father was a construction worker, and he received his love of the arts from his mother, who exposed him to theatre, where he saw operettas and other light entertainment. He attended Classical High School in Providence, Rhode Island.

In 1907, at the age of 18, Walker was apprenticed to Providence architect Howard K. Hilton. The three-year apprenticeship paid one dollar a week for the first year, two a week for the second year and three a week for the third. While working there Walker attended classes at the Massachusetts Institute of Technology. After two years had moved up to a design position, paying nine dollars a week. He left during his final semester before graduating, and, in 1913, married Stella Forbes, of Providence. He was a Rotch Traveling Scholar in 1916.

Walker practiced in various offices in Boston, Montreal, and New York City, "in charge of planning and design of churches, monumental buildings, universities and commercial buildings."

== Military service ==
In World War I, Walker served in the U.S. Army Corps of Engineers of the American Expeditionary Force as a second lieutenant in the Camouflage Section, from 1917 to 1918, as did many other artists, sculptors and architects.

== Career ==
In 1919, at age 30, after his return from Europe for his military service, Walker was offered a junior design position with McKenzie, Voorhees and Gmelin, a New York firm that was the successor firm to the one begun by Cyrus L. W. Eidlitz. Walker was to remain there for the remainder of his career.

Skyscraper design was to be the focus of Walker's career, and he was to be influential in determining what they would should look like. He said of it:

The skyscraper is the only means of living in this age of machine. It is an expression and reflection of the age.

And of the designer of these buildings:

The architect of the future will have to be a psychologist, because it is as important for the architect to design a building for man to be mentally comfortable in as it is for him to design one in which he will be physically comfortable.

In his first few years with the firm, Walker used his Beaux-Arts training to provide support for the firm's ongoing commissions for projects like the Brooklyn Municipal Building, completed in 1924, and the Brooklyn Edison Building, completed in 1923.

With his design for the Barclay–Vesey Building (1922–1926), commissioned by New York Telephone in 1921, Walker became a lead designer and took McKenzie, Voorhees and Gmelin in a new direction. The Barclay-Vesey Building is credited as being the first skyscraper to use the New York 1916 Zoning Resolution as a design asset. Inspired in part by Hugh Ferriss's theoretical drawings exhibited in 1922, Walker created a massive asymmetrical tower set back from its base. The design led the way for a generation of skyscrapers built using the set-back principle. It has also been described as the first Art Deco skyscraper because of its inventive ornament surrounding doorways and windows and elevator foyers. As a result of the success of the design, Walker made partner in the firm and its name was changed to Voorhees, Gmelin, and Walker in 1926. Befitting his success, Walker moved to the suburbs of New York, to Westchester County.

After the completion of the Barclay-Vesey Building, Walker designed several other buildings using its combination of asymmetrical setbacks and towers with Art Deco ornament, including the Salvation Army Headquarters (1929–30) on West 14th Street, the Irving Trust Bank at 1 Wall Street (1928–31), and several other telephone buildings throughout New York City and the state, including those in Syracuse and Rochester as well as the New Jersey Bell Headquarters Building.

During the 1930s as Art Deco waned, Walker was deeply involved with the planning of the 1933 Century of Progress Exposition in Chicago and in the 1939 New York World's Fair.

Walker was an active member of the American Institute of Architects (AIA) and became its president in 1949. During his two-year presidency he was instrumental in establishing the AIA's College of Fellows which gained approval in 1952. He later served as its first Chancellor from 1952 to 1954. In 1957, on the occasion of the AIA's 100th anniversary, the AIA recognized Walker's extraordinary service to the profession by creating a special award for him, the AIA Centennial Medal of Honor (Gold Medal). The headline of The New York Times reporting the award dubbed Walker the "Architect of the Century." To commemorate the event, Walker also wrote and published an autobiography.

Walker retired from Voorhees, Walker, Foley, Smith & Smith in 1959 but remained active within the profession. Prior to his death, however, he destroyed his AIA award.

Walker killed himself in January 1973, using a silver bullet that he had forged himself.

The Ralph T. Walker Papers, his Nachlass are preserved at the Special Collections Research Center of the Syracuse University Libraries. They contain correspondence, articles, manuscript essays, speeches, notes and notebooks as well as photographs, project files, sketches, clippings, and scrapbooks.

== Controversy ==
In 1960, Walker resigned from the AIA after a conflict over professional ethics. The AIA accused a member of Walker's firm of acting in an "unprofessional manner" by taking a contract that already belonged to another firm. Walker was devastated by the controversy and self-published a booklet defending his reputation—and including much of the correspondence surrounding the incident – which he sent to all members of the College of Fellows. He ended the essay with:

May I say, finally, that I have no illusions of grandeur; quite to the contrary, I am very humble in my knowledge that through forty years of my life my life has been an open book of service to my fellow architects and for the public good. When I sever my connections with the A.I.A. I do so with my own self respect, as a matter of pride and I am sure within your knowledge of my character. I completely scorn the falsifying, the sanctimonious, the cheap and the shoddy.

Walker was reinstated to the AIA in 1965.

== Other organizations ==
Walker belonged to several other organizations. He was appointed by President Dwight D. Eisenhower to the U.S. Commission of Fine Arts, serving from 1959 to 1963; he was a trustee of the Lavanburg Foundation, Vice President of the Citizen's Housing & Planning Council of New York, and a member of the Housing Committee, and Chairman of the Planning Committee of New Castle, New York. In addition, he was a president of the Architectural League of New York, president of the Municipal American Society in New York City, and a member of the American Institute of Planners, the American Society of Planning Officials, and the National Association of Housing Officials.

== Selected designs ==
(all in New York City unless otherwise indicated)

- The New York Telephone Company Building, aka the Barclay–Vesey Building (1922–26); damaged in the September 11 attacks and later partially converted to residential condos
- Western Union Building, now 60 Hudson Street (1928–1930)
- Irving Trust Building, now One Wall Street (1928–1931)
- New Jersey Bell Headquarters Building, Newark (1929)
- Salvation Army Headquarters, 120–130 West 14th Street (1929–1930)
- New York Telephone Company Long Island Headquarters, 101 Willoughby Street (1929–1930), now converted to the BellTel Lofts (2006)
- Verizon Building (c. 1930s), 212 West 18th Street, in 2012 converted to residential condominiums under the name "Walker Tower."
- New York Telephone Building, 425 West 50th Street, (1930) in 2013 converted to residential condominiums under the name "Stella Tower," named for Walker's wife.
- Times Square Building, Rochester, New York (1930)
- AT&T Long Distance Building, 32 Sixth Avenue (1930–1932)
- AT&T Pavilion, General Electric Pavilion, Borden Pavilion, Petroleum Pavilion, New York World's Fair (1939)
- Charles Hayden Memorial Library, MIT, Cambridge, Massachusetts (1946–1951)

== Sources ==
- Holliday, Kathryn E., ed. (2012). Ralph Walker: Architect of the Century. New York City, New York, USA: Rizzoli International. ISBN 978-0847838882.
