= Verizon New Jersey =

Telecommunications company owned by Verizon

Verizon New Jersey, Inc.
- Current logo of Verizon New Jersey, Inc.; New Jersey Bell logo from 1969 to 1994.; New Jersey Bell logo, 1920 - 1939
- Formerly: New Jersey Bell Telephone Company (1927-1994); Bell Atlantic - New Jersey (1994-2000)
- Type: Subsidiary
- Industry: Telecommunications
- Founded: 1904; 122 years ago
- Headquarters: Newark, New Jersey, U.S.
- Area served: New Jersey
- Key people: Dennis M. Bone (president)
- Products: POTS, DSL, FiOS (FTTP)
- Parent: AT&T (1904-1983); Verizon (1984-present)
- Website: Verizon New Jersey

Verizon New Jersey, Inc., formerly New Jersey Bell Telephone Company, is the Bell Operating Company serving the U.S. state of New Jersey. In 1984, the Bell System Divestiture split New Jersey Bell off into a Regional Bell Operating Company, along with the 21 other BOCs AT&T had a majority stake in. On January 1, 1984, New Jersey Bell became part of Bell Atlantic.

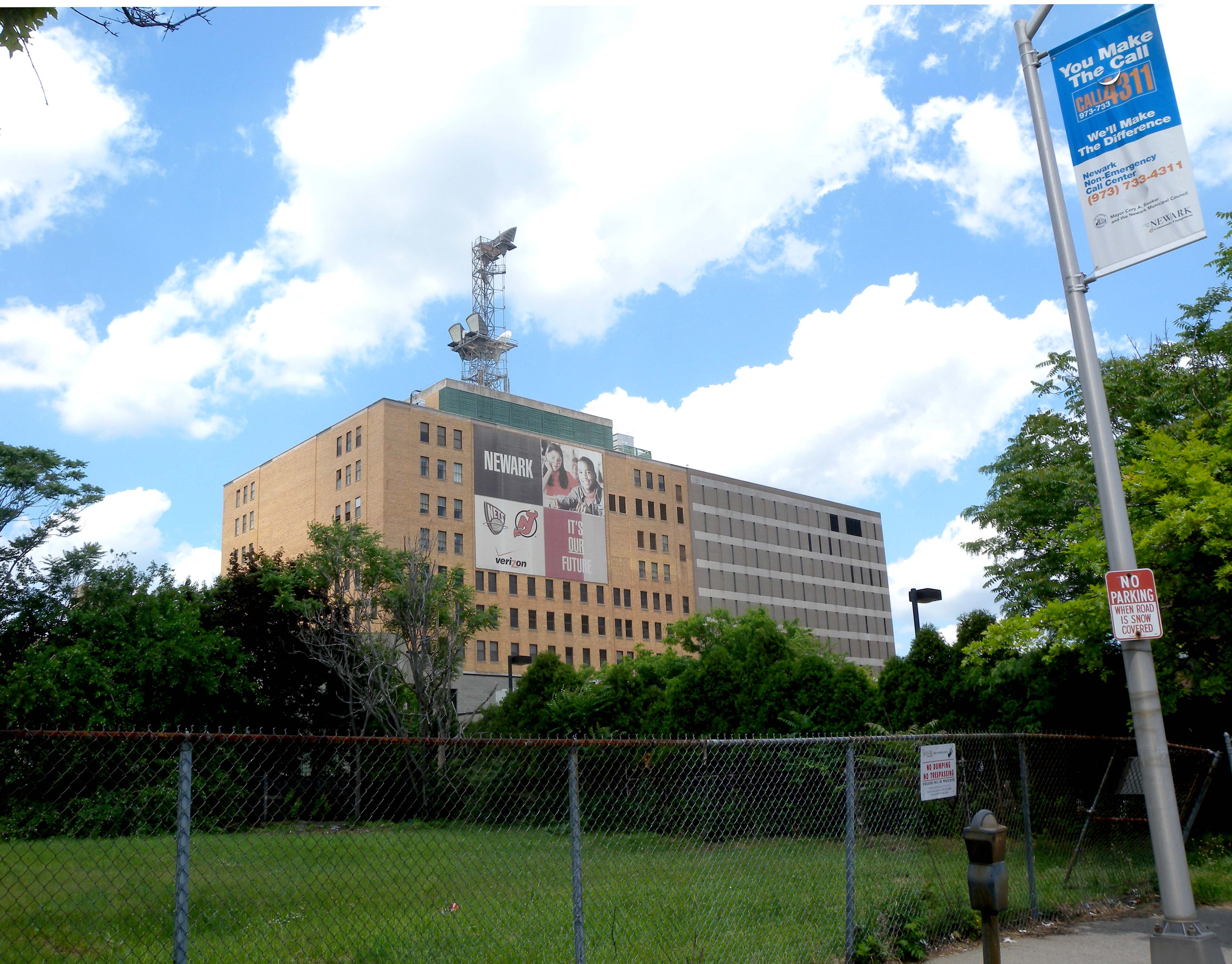
Large exchange building in Newark

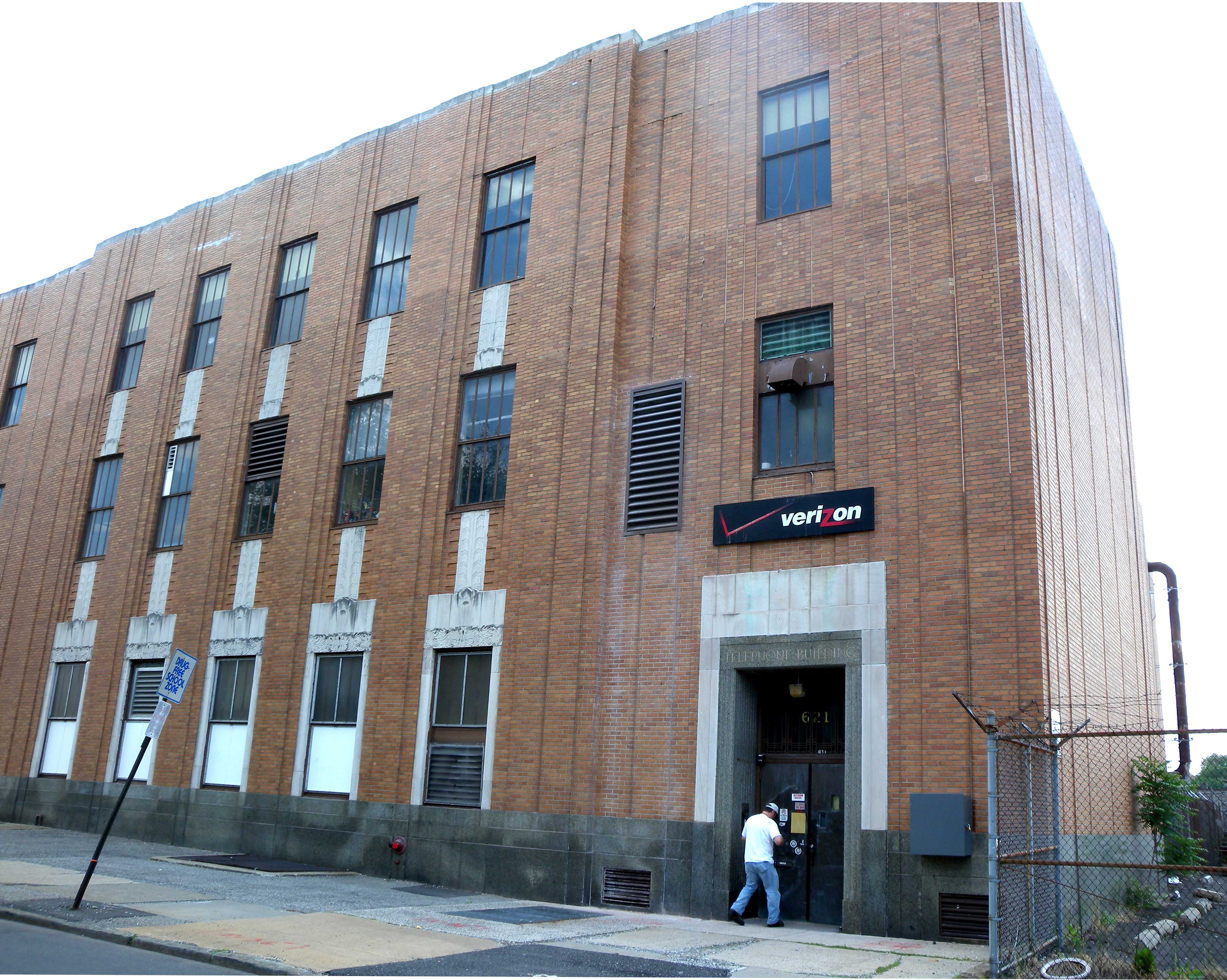
Smaller exchange in East Orange, New Jersey

New Jersey Bell was founded in 1904 as an AT&T company serving southern New Jersey, named Delaware and Atlantic Telegraph & Telephone Company. New York Telephone served northern New Jersey. In October 1927, D&A T&T changed its name to New Jersey Bell Telephone Company, and purchased the New Jersey properties of New York Telephone which had belonged to New York and New Jersey Telephone and Telegraph.

Throughout the 1980s to the first half of the 1990s, New Jersey Bell kept its traditional identity. In 1994, Bell Atlantic started rebranding all its companies to Bell Atlantic-(state), so New Jersey Bell became Bell Atlantic - New Jersey, Inc. In 2000, after the Bell Atlantic - GTE merger, the corporation changed its name to Verizon, and so New Jersey Bell once again changed its name, this time to Verizon New Jersey, Inc. Verizon New Jersey's headquarters are in the New Jersey Bell Headquarters Building on 540 Broad Street in Newark.

== Innovations and firsts ==
After Bell Labs moved from New York to New Jersey, they often installed new technological developments there, before deploying farther afield.

- 1951 New Jersey Bell was the first Bell Operating Company to deploy Direct Distance Dialing for long-distance telephone calls in Englewood, New Jersey. Previously, all long-distance calls had to be handled through an operator.
- 1965 The first installation of the first Bell System electronic switching system, the Western Electric 1ESS, was installed at New Jersey Bell's Succasuna central office. Prior to the 1ESS switch, switching was achieved under electromechanical control.
- 1987 New Jersey Bell was the first to introduce Caller ID service. The first Caller ID box was sold at a Sears store in Jersey City, NJ, was manufactured by Colonial Data Technologies, and branded AT&T.
- 2006 Verizon New Jersey was the first company to file application for a video franchise under New Jersey's new centralized video franchise law. Previously, cable television providers had to file with every municipality in which they wished to provide service individually, thus making Verizon New Jersey the state's first statewide competitive "cable company".

== See also ==
- Bell System
- Verizon Communications
