= New Jersey Bell Headquarters Building =

- U.S. National Register of Historic Places
- New Jersey Register of Historic Places
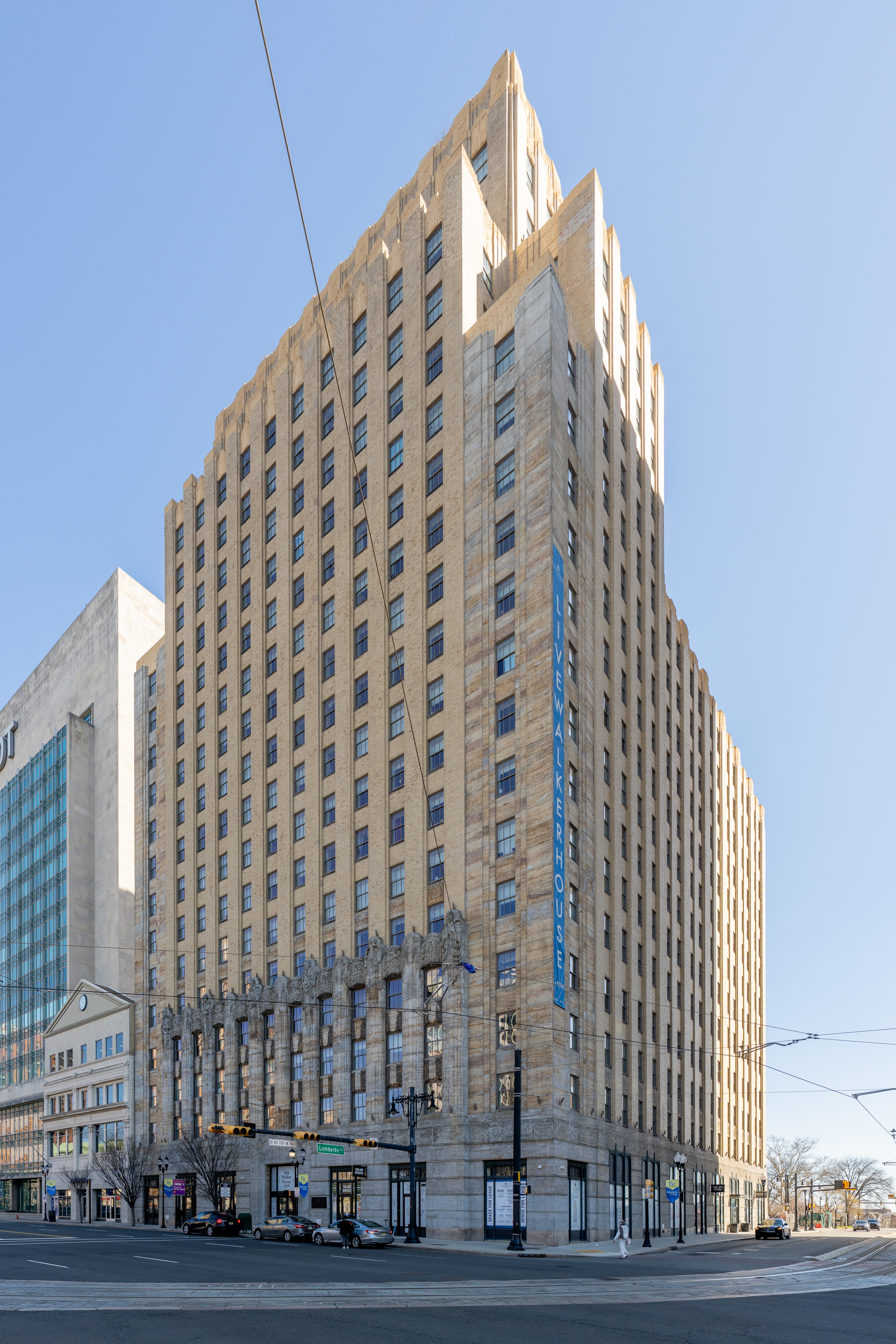

- Location within Essex County, New Jersey Location within New Jersey Location within the United States
- Location: 540 Broad Street, Newark, New Jersey
- Coordinates: 40°44′35″N 74°10′9″W
- Area: 1 acre (0.40 ha)
- Built: 1929
- Architects: Ralph Thomas Walker; Voorhees, Gmelin and Walker
- Architectural style: Art Deco
- NRHP reference No.: 05001054
- NJRHP No.: 3127

Significant dates
- Added to NRHP: September 21, 2005
- Designated NJRHP: August 3, 2005

The New Jersey Bell Headquarters Building is located in Newark, Essex County, New Jersey, United States. The building was built in 1929 by the New Jersey Bell Telephone Company and was added to the National Register of Historic Places on September 21, 2005. The art deco building was designed by Ralph Thomas Walker of the architectural firm Voorhees, Gmelin, and Walker. The buff brick and sandstone façade is decorated with pilasters created by sculptor Edward McCartan. Since the building's opening, soft orange lights have bathed its upper floors at night. The building is 20 stories and 275 ft (84 m) tall. The building later became headquarters for Verizon New Jersey, Inc.

The building was sold in 2017 and has been converted to residential high-rise market rate apartments and renamed Walker House. Verizon still leases several floors in the building. It opened in 2019 as the Walker House, named for the architect who designed it.

The Cory Booker 2020 presidential campaign opened in the building in March 2019.

== See also ==
- National Register of Historic Places listings in Essex County, New Jersey
- List of tallest buildings in Newark

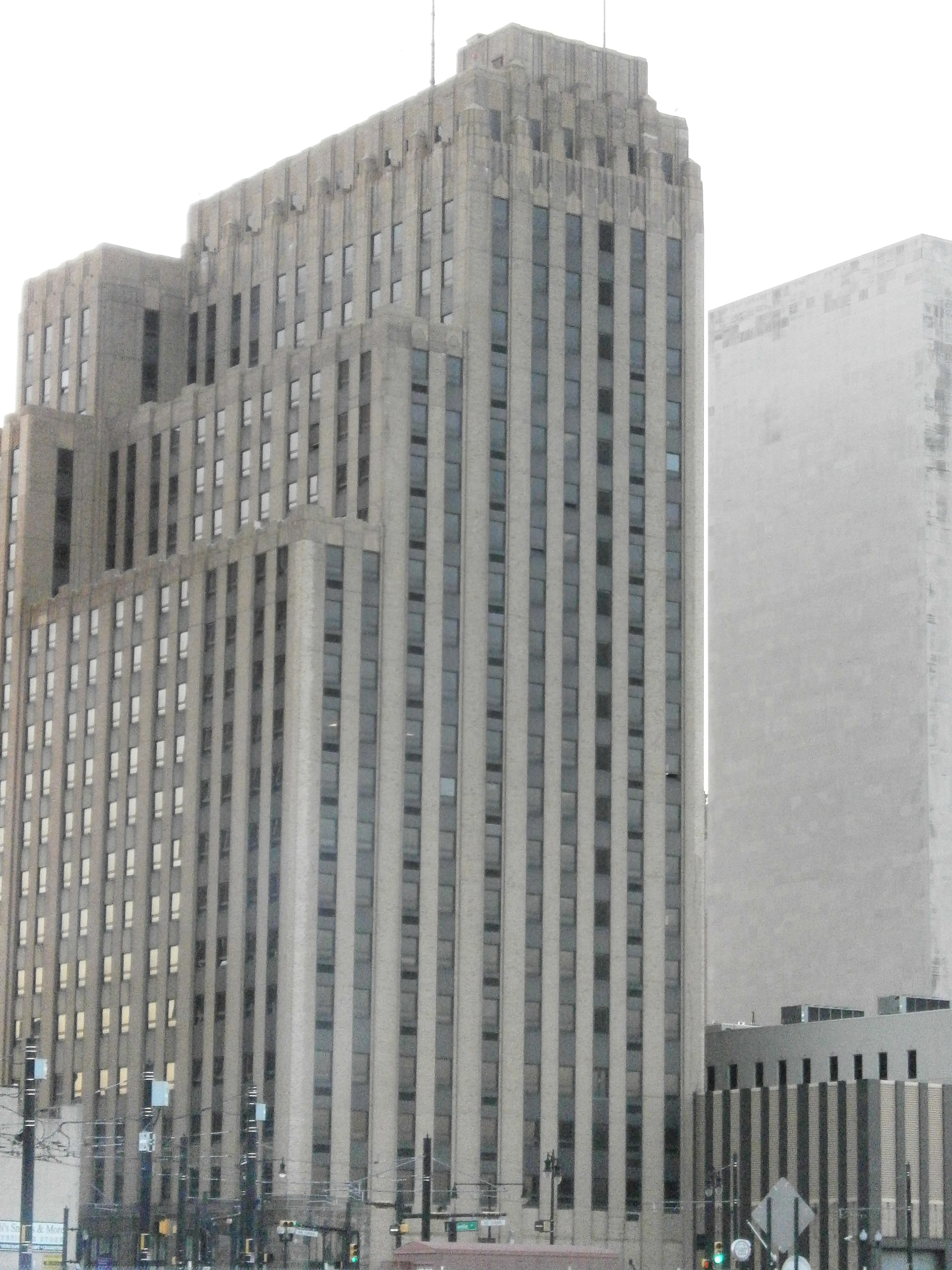
