= Robert Tingban =

Liberian educator and politician (died 2001)

Robert B.S. Tingban was a Liberian politician in the late 20th and early 21st centuries. A native of the former Saclepea-Mahn District in Nimba County, he farmed and taught school during his youth. Later in his life, he was elected to the House of Representatives of Liberia from Nimba County, where he served until his death. A protracted illness forced him to travel to the United States for medical attention, but as his condition worsened, he returned to Liberia in 2001. Tingman died in the hospital at Phebe in Bong County on 14 May 2001 after a week in that hospital's care. He was the fifth Representative to die in office after the National Patriotic Party won a majority of seats in the elections of 1997, following Shadrach Artis and Alexander Robertson of Grand Bassa County, Benjamin Warner of Montserrado County, and Stanley A.A. Yangley of Nimba County.
