= Eidlitz =

Eidlitz is a surname. Notable people with the surname include:

- Cyrus L. W. Eidlitz (1853–1921), American architect
- Dorothy Meigs Eidlitz (1891–1976), American photographer, arts patron and women's rights advocate
- Leopold Eidlitz (1823–1908), American architect
- Marc Eidlitz (1826–1892), American builder
- Walther Eidlitz, called "Vāmana Dāsa" (1892–1976), Austrian writer, poet, Indologist and historian of religion
- Zerah Eidlitz (c. 1725–1786), Talmudist

== See also ==
- Edlitz, Austria
