= Our Lady of Peace (disambiguation) =

Our Lady of Peace is a Roman Catholic title for the Blessed Virgin Mary.

Our Lady of Peace may also refer to:

== Religious buildings ==
- Cathedral Basilica of Our Lady of Peace, Lomas de Zamora, Argentina
- Cathedral Basilica of Our Lady of Peace, La Paz, Bolivia
- Cathedral Basilica of Our Lady of Peace, Potosí, Bolivia
- Our Lady of Peace Cathedral, N'Djamena, Chad
- Our Lady of Peace Cathedral, Bukavu, Democratic Republic of the Congo
- Basilica of Our Lady of Peace, Yamoussoukro, Côte d'Ivoire
- Our Lady of Peace Cathedral, Baja California Sur, La Paz, Mexico
- Cathedral Our Lady of Peace, Trujillo, Venezuela
- Church of Our Lady of Peace, Singapore
- Church of Santa Maria della Pace (Our Lady of Peace, in English), Rome, Italy
- Church of Our Lady of Peace, prelatic church of Opus Dei, Rome, Italy

=== United States ===
- Our Lady of Peace Shrine, Santa Clara, California
- Our Lady of Peace Church (Stratford, Connecticut)
- Cathedral Basilica of Our Lady of Peace, Honolulu, Hawaiʻi
- Church of Our Lady of Peace, New York City, New York
- Our Lady of Peace Church (Erie, Pennsylvania)

== Other uses ==
- The Academy of Our Lady of Peace, a high school of the Diocese of San Diego

== See also ==
- OLP (disambiguation)
- Our Lady Peace, rock band
