= OLP (disambiguation) =

OLP usually refers to Our Lady Peace, a Canadian alternative rock band,

OLP may refer to:

- One Liberty Plaza
- Off-line programming (robotics)
- Our Lady of Peace (disambiguation)
- OLP Guitars
- Ontario Liberal Party, a provincial political party in Ontario, Canada
- Royal Mail Online Postage, a service provided by Royal Mail in the UK
- Ordinal linguistic personification, the sense that ordered sequences have personalities
- Open License Program, a Microsoft volume license service
- Oral lichen planus of the oral mucosa

Places

- Old Loggers Path, Pennsylvania, USA
- Olympic Dam Airport (IATA airport code: OLP) in South Australia
- Olympic Park railway station, Sydney (Station code: OLP) in Sydney, Australia
- Olp, Lleida, a village in Sort, Pallars Sobirà, Spain
