= Treadwell Farm Historic District =

Historic district in Manhattan, New York

Coordinates: 40°45′48″N 73°57′59″W

- U.S. National Register of Historic Places
- U.S. Historic district
- New York State Register of Historic Places
- New York City Landmark
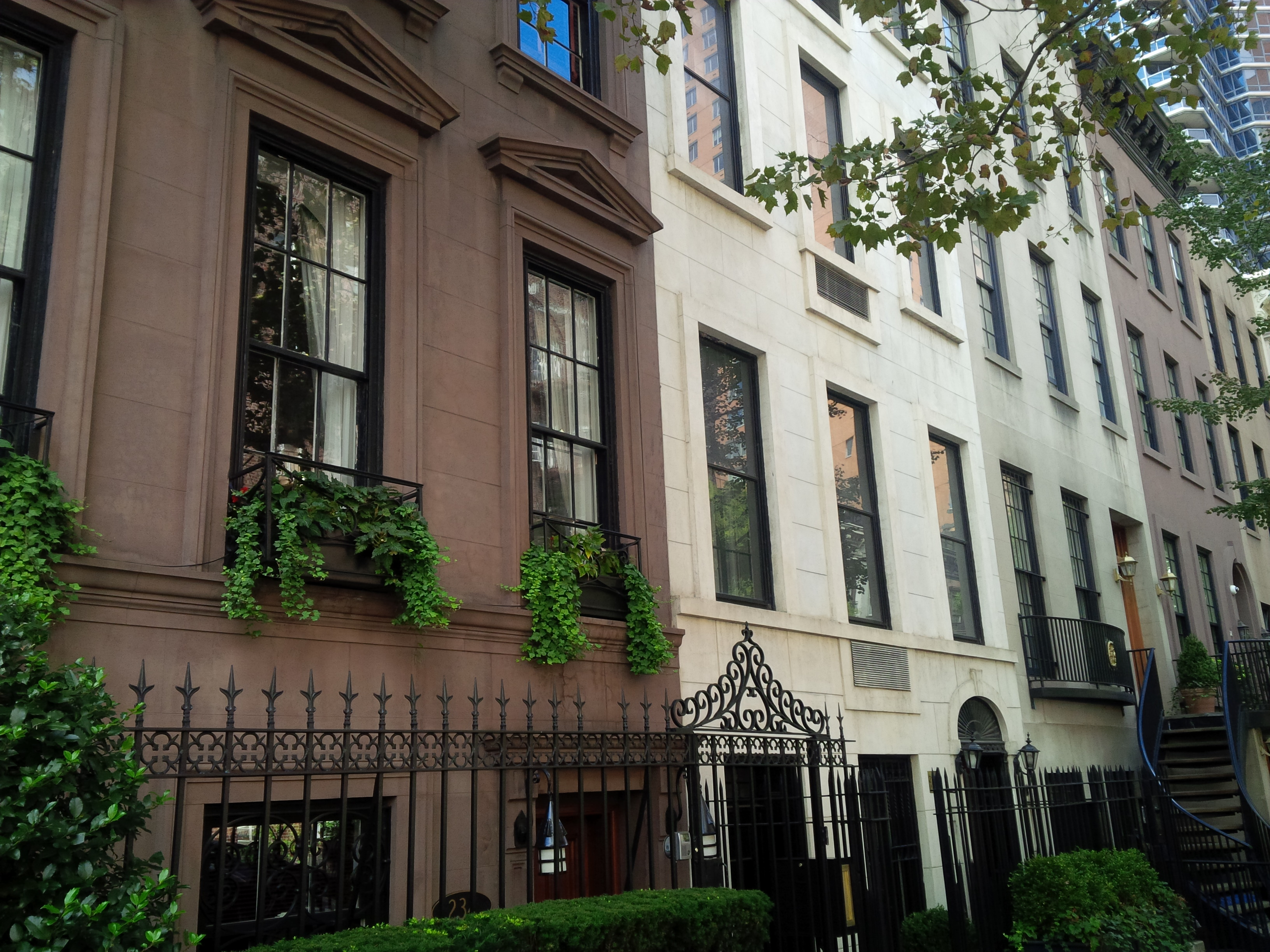
- 234, 232, and 230 East 61st Street

- Location within Manhattan Location within New York City Location within New York Location within the United States
- Location: E. 61st and 62nd Sts. bet. Second and Third Aves., New York, New York
- Area: 3.5 acres (1.4 ha)
- Built: 1868
- Architect: Pirrson, James W.; et.al.
- Architectural style: Late Victorian, Late 19th And 20th Century Revivals
- NRHP reference No.: 04000541
- NYCL No.: 0536

Significant dates
- Added to NRHP: May 27, 2004
- Designated NYSRHP: April 5, 2004
- Designated NYCL: December 13, 1967

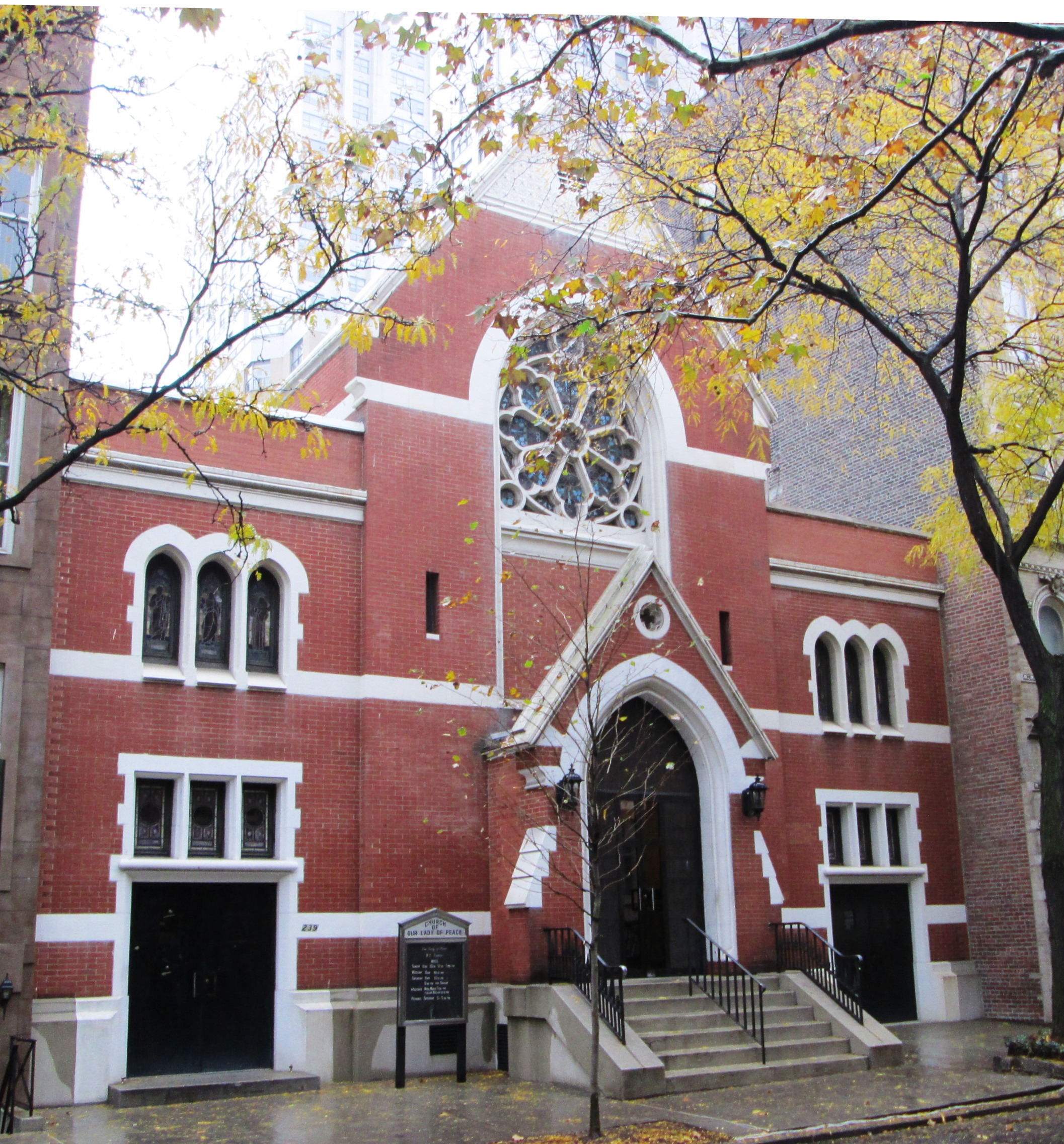
Our Lady of Peace was originally the Presbyterian Church of the Redeemer

The Treadwell Farm Historic District is a small historic district located on parts of East 61st and 62nd streets between Second and Third avenues, on the Upper East Side of Manhattan in New York City.

Designated by the New York City Landmarks Preservation Commission on December 13, 1967, making it one of the first historic districts in the city, it is primarily made up of three- and four-story brownstone residences constructed in the middle- to late- 19th century. It also includes the Church of Our Lady of Peace, Trinity Baptist Church, and several turn-of-the-century apartment buildings, and is notable for the general uniformity of the heights of the houses and the style of the architecture, as well as the overall character and charm of the neighborhood. The district was listed on the National Register of Historic Places in 2004.

== History and description ==
Treadwell Farm was named for the Treadwell family, who owned the land at the time it was developed. In the Colonial period, the property was part of the Peter Pra Van Zandt farm, although the historic district also includes a small triangular piece of the William Beekman farm. In 1815, Adam Tredwell [sic], a fur merchant, and Stephen Thorne Jr. bought the Van Zandt farm, paying $13,000 for 24 acres. When Thorne died in 1830, Tredwell bought his half of the property. After Tredwell's death in 1852, his daughter Elizabeth bought the Beekman tract, and the combined property was divided into lots; these were sold for development beginning in 1854. By 1868, restrictive covenants attached to the sale specified standards for heights, widths and construction of buildings on the lots, and also restricted the types of businesses which could be located there.

The major development of the Treadwell Farm property took place from 1868–76, and was primarily in the form of Italianate row houses, with echoes of the French Second Empire style. The Presbyterian Church of the Redeemer, now the Roman Catholic Church of Our Lady of Peace, was built in 1886–87, and six-story apartment buildings at 245 and 247 East 62nd Street were built in 1899–1900.

Noted architects who designed buildings in the district include Richard Morris Hunt, Samuel A. Warner, James W. Pirrson and George F. Pelham.

In the 1920s, between 1919 and 1922, most of the buildings in the district were significantly altered. Many stoops were removed and architectural detail reduced to a more simplified form. In addition, in 1930 a church in the Scandinavian Modern style, designed by Martin G. Hedmark, was built at 250 East 61st Street.

== Notable residents ==
By late in the 19th century, the Treadwell Farm area had deteriorated some, but affluent New Yorkers rediscovered it in the decades after World War I. The area's residents have included Frank Sinatra, Mia Farrow, Walter Lippmann, Tallulah Bankhead, Kim Novak, Montgomery Clift, Eleanor Roosevelt, and Paul Gallico.

== See also ==
- List of New York City Designated Landmarks in Manhattan from 59th to 110th Streets
- National Register of Historic Places listings in Manhattan from 59th to 110th Streets
