= HLW International =

American architecture firm

HLW
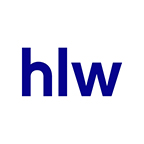
- Type: Limited liability partnership
- Industry: Architecture, interior design, landscape design, urban planning
- Founded: New York, New York, United States (1885)
- Founder: Cyrus Eidlitz
- Headquarters: New York, New York
- Number of locations: New York, New York; Madison, New Jersey; Stamford, Connecticut; Los Angeles, California; San Francisco, California; West Palm Beach, Florida; London.
- Area served: International
- Key people: Susan Boyle, Richard Brennan, John Gering, John Mack
- Services: Architecture, interior design, landscape design, lighting design, strategy, sustainability, graphics and brand design, urban planning
- Number of employees: 235
- Website: www.hlw.design,

HLW is a full-service design firm headquartered in New York City, with offices in Madison, New Jersey; Stamford, Connecticut; Los Angeles and San Francisco, California; West Palm Beach, Florida; and London. HLW is one of the oldest continuously operating design firms in the United States.

== Predecessor firms ==
=== Cyrus L. W. Eidlitz (1885–1910) ===
The firm traces its origins to 1885, when Cyrus L. W. Eidlitz worked on the design of the Metropolitan Telephone Building on Cortlandt Street between Broadway and Church Street in Manhattan. Eidlitz was the son of noted architect and a founder of the American Institute of Architects Leopold Eidlitz and nephew of Marc Eidlitz, a major New York builder. The commission began the firm's long association with what was to become the New York Telephone Company and, later, Verizon.

Works as C.L.W. Eidlitz:

- 1885 – Alexander Graham Bell commissions first Manhattan telephone building

=== Eidlitz & McKenzie (1900–1910) ===
Eidlitz formed a partnership with structural engineer Andrew C. McKenzie, establishing the firm of Eidlitz & McKenzie, to pioneer a new building design. With Andrew McKenzie, he formed one of the first architecture firms that put architects and engineers on equal footing. Eidlitz and McKenzie worked primarily on telephone buildings, a new building type in the period.

In 1905, the firm designed The New York Times Building on the site then renamed Times Square in its honor. The task was complicated by the simultaneous construction of a subway at the building's foundation.

Works as Eidlitz & McKenzie:

- 1900–1909 – The New York Times Tower, No. 1 Times Square
- 1896–1897 – Society House of The American Society of Civil Engineers, 220 West 57th Street

=== McKenzie, Voorhees, Gmelin, and Walker (1910–1926) ===
In 1910, Eidlitz withdrew from the firm. Stephen F. Voorhees and Paul Gmelin, already with the firm became partners and Eidlitz and McKenzie was reorganized and renamed as McKenzie, Voorhees and Gmelin. This became a tradition of the firm: partners choosing their successors from within the firm in order to establish a smooth transfer of ownership. Over the next fifteen years, the firm added notable designs for clients in the telephone, banking and R&D industries, including labs for Western Electric (1922), the South Brooklyn Savings Bank (1924) and the Brooklyn Municipal Building (1924).

Works as McKenzie, Voorhees, Gmelin, and Walker:

- 1910–1919 – New York Telephone Building
- 1922–1924 – National Bible Institute School and Dormitory, 340 West 55th Street

=== Voorhees, Gmelin and Walker (1926–1940) ===
Upon McKenzie's death, Ralph T. Walker became a partner, and the firm name was changed to Voorhees, Gmelin and Walker.

For the next decade, the design and construction of a series of skyscrapers began at the firm with the hiring of Ralph T. Walker. Notable structures included the Barclay-Vesey Building, completed in 1926; the Western Union Building at 60 Hudson Street, completed in 1930 and now a central technical facility; Salvation Army Headquarters, completed in 1930; the 50-story Irving Trust Headquarters Building at 1 Wall Street, completed in 1931; and 32 Avenue of the Americas, completed in 1932.

During the Great Depression Walker and Voorhees worked on the 1933 Century of Progress International Exposition in Chicago and the 1939 New York World's Fair. The firm's Petroleum Industries Pavilion (1939) was critically well received.

Works as Voorhees, Gmelin and Walker:

- 1922–1926 – Barclay–Vesey Building
- 1922–1924 – 340 West 55th Street, originally the National Bible Institute School and Dormitory
- 1929 – New Jersey Bell Headquarters Building, Newark, New Jersey
- 1929 – Times Square Building, Rochester, New York
- 1929–1930 – Salvation Army Headquarters, 120–130 West 14th Street
- 1930 – 60 Hudson Street
- 1931 – 101 Willoughby Street
- 1932 – 1 Wall Street (Irving Trust Company Building)
- 1932 – 32 Avenue of the Americas
- 1933 – Chicago World's Fair

=== Voorhees, Walker, Foley & Smith (1940–1955) ===
In 1940, Max H. Foley and Perry Coke Smith became partners, and Voorhees, Walker, Foley & Smith was formed. The offices were recorded as being located at 101 Park Avenue, New York City.

During World War II, the firm's contribution to the war effort began with a commission to design Army Air Corps bases in Trinidad. Laboratories geared to defense follow, along with structures at the Brooklyn Navy Yard and facilities necessary for the transport of heavy military equipment.

In 1941, the first phase of the new Bell Telephone Laboratories was completed on 250 acres (1.0 km^{2}) at Murray Hill, New Jersey. The project introduced the flexible-modular approach to laboratory design, demonstrating an efficient use of space and accommodating 6,000 scientists, engineers, and administrators dedicated to the study of sound and sound transmission. Bell Labs foreshadowed the subsequent postwar movement of research labs from converted manufacturing plants to separate facilities in suburban locations.

During this period, Benjamin Lane Smith, one of the firm's chief designers, became a partner; however the firm's name remained Voorhees, Walker, Foley & Smith.

Projects of note during this period included Argonne National Laboratory (the research center for the U.S. Atomic Energy Commission in Lemont, Illinois) and the Savannah River Plant in Aiken, South Carolina, which was built on a site larger than the entire island of Manhattan.

Works as Voorhees, Walker, Foley & Smith:

- 1940–1945 – Bell Telephone Research Laboratory

=== Voorhees, Walker, Smith & Smith (1955–1959) ===
In 1955, Voorhees, Walker, Smith & Smith was formed, reflecting Foley's departure and Benjamin Lane Smith's earlier inclusion as partner.

Works as Voorhees, Walker, Smith & Smith:

- 1950–1959 – School of Engineering, Columbia University

=== Voorhees, Walker, Smith, Smith & Haines (1959–1964) ===
In 1959, Charles Haines, a principal contributor to the firm's design work for research facilities, became a partner. Voorhees, Walker, Smith, Smith & Haines was formed. The main office of the company was located at 101 Park Avenue, New York City. The original building was replaced by a new building at the same location with the same address. During the 1959–1964 period, a branch office was located at 2 Park Avenue.

Works as Voorhees, Walker, Smith, Smith & Haines:

- 1960–1969 – NASA/Goddard Space Center
- 1961 – Stony Brook University Campus
- 1961 – Eleutherian Mills Historical Library (since 1984 the Hagley Library).

=== Smith, Smith Lundberg & Waehler (1964–1968) ===
In 1964, after Robert Lundberg and Frank J. Waehler became partners, a newly christened Smith, Smith Lundberg & Waehler was formed.

With the celebration of its seventy-fifth anniversary in the early 1960s the firm began to expand its operations internationally. At the same time, the office continued to design extensive testing and research facilities for both private and government clients within the United States. One notable example of this work was the Goddard Space Flight Center, a multi-building project for the National Aeronautics and Space Administration, was completed in 1965 to implement President John F. Kennedy's commitment to put a man on the moon. With the retirements of Benjamin Lane Smith in 1966 and Perry Coke Smith in 1968, the Smith names were dropped from the firm of Haines, Lundberg Waehler.

Works as Smith, Smith Lundberg & Waehler:

- 1961 – Stony Brook University Campus
- 1968 – Searle Chemistry Laboratory, University of Illinois at Chicago

== History of Haines, Lundberg & Waehler (1968–present) ==
Following Perry Coke Smith's retirement in 1968, the firm's name was changed to Haines, Lundberg Waehler, or HLW. International projects allowed the firm to bring their designs outside the United States in the late 1960s and early 1970s, including the Centro Sperimentale Metallurgico, a research center for the development of steel projects was completed on a 125-acre (0.51 km^{2}) site outside Rome and the International Institute Of Tropical Agriculture, a research and housing facility on a 3,000-acre (12 km^{2}) site in Ibadan, Nigeria. In order to accommodate growth in its overseas practice, the firm created a new division of operations, HLW International, with its first offices in Beirut and then in Athens with projects extending to Lebanon and Saudi Arabia.

In 1982, the first Midtown Manhattan office of the U.S. Trust Corporation was restored by the firm to the original 1896 design by McKim Mead and White, while accommodating the requirements of a 1980s office. HLW won awards from the New York Landmarks Conservancy, the Building Owners and Managers Association, and the Metropolitan Chapter of the Victorian Society in America. In 1983, significant modifications were made for the existing Chemical Bank World Headquarters at 277 Park Avenue in Manhattan. This design included the enclosure of an existing plaza to create Chemcourt, which provided the city with a park-like enclosed space.

Exactly 100 years after the firm's beginning with a commission to design the first telephone building in New York, a new project for NYNEX Corporation was initiated, as was a training center for The Travelers Insurance Companies in Hartford, Connecticut.

In the decades since HLW's 100th anniversary, the firm has extended to broadcast, film and television industries. For 20th Century Fox in Los Angeles, HLW created a 50-acre (200,000 m^{2}) campus that housed the first fully digital network broadcast center. The project incorporated several buildings, creative site/landscape design and over 1,000,000 square feet (93,000 m^{2}) of historical renovations. When Avon Products hired the firm to design a new global research and design center, HLW relocated the company from its old space into its new 227,500-square-foot (21,140 m^{2}) facility in New York. Additional 21st-century work includes the United Nations Secretariat Building and North Lawn Conference Building, and Google's East Coast Headquarters at 111 Eighth Avenue.
