= Cyrus L. Warner =

American architect

- Born: Cyrus Lazelle Warner; 1789
- Died: 1852 (aged 62–63)
- Occupation: Architect
- Known for: Greek Revival architecture
- Notable work: Kahal Kadosh Beth Elohim Synagogue
- Spouse: Elizabeth Wadland Adams
- Children: Samuel A. Warner; Benjamin Warner; Harriet Amanda Warner
- Relatives: Leopold Eidlitz (son-in-law); Cyrus L. W. Eidlitz (grandson)

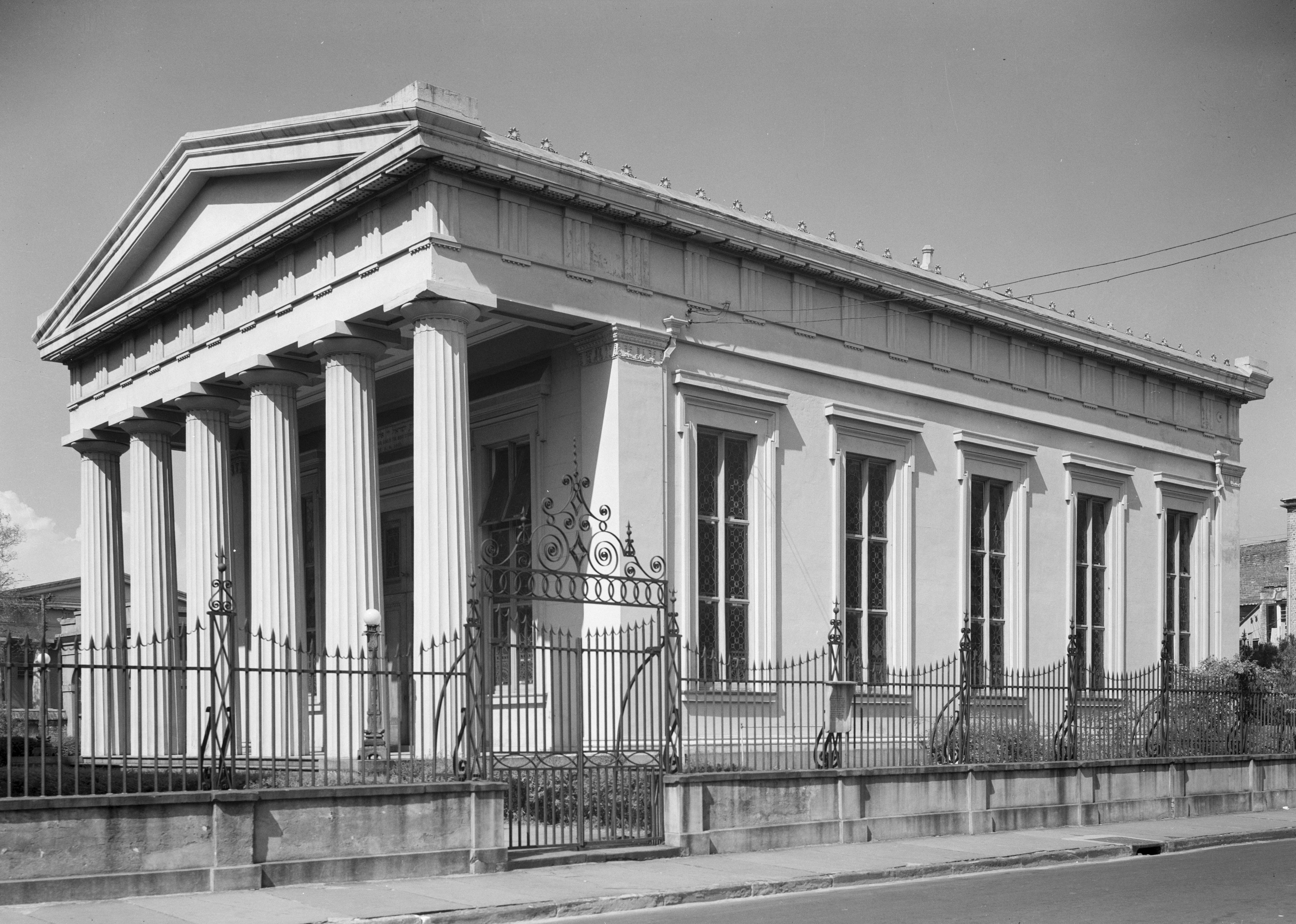
Kahal Kadosh Beth Elohim Synagogue

Cyrus Lazelle Warner (1789–1852) was an American architect in New York City. He designed the Greek Revival architecture Kahal Kadosh Beth Elohim Synagogue, built in 1840 in Charleston, South Carolina, as well as a church in a similar style two years earlier. He was also involved in the Merchant's Exchange Building (New York) with Isaiah Rogers. He had his office at 122 Broadway from 1842 until 1847.

His sons Samuel A. Warner and Benjamin Warner were both architects in New York City. His daughter Harriet Amanda Warner married architect Leopold Eidlitz in 1845. Cyrus L. W. Eidlitz, Warner's grandson, was also an architect.

He may have served in the military from Cayuga County.

He was married to Elizabeth Wadland Adams (1792–1860).
