= Cyrus L. W. Eidlitz =

American architect

- Born: Cyrus Lazelle Warner Eidlitz; July 27, 1853; New York City, New York, US
- Died: October 5, 1921 (aged 68); New York City, New York, U.S.
- Education: Polytechnic Institute in Stuttgart, (Germany)
- Occupation: Architect
- Practice: Eidlitz & McKenzie (now HLW International)
- Buildings: One Times Square; former Times Tower in Times Square, (Midtown Manhattan, New York City)
- Spouse: Jennie Turner Dudley (m. 1854)
- Children: 2 daughters
- Parents: Leopold Eidlitz (father); Harriet Amanda Lazelle Warner (mother)
- Relatives: Marc Eidlitz (uncle); Cyrus L. Warner (grandfather)

Cyrus Lazelle Warner Eidlitz (July 27, 1853 – October 5, 1921) was an American architect best known for designing One Times Square in New York City. Educated in Germany, he was also founder of the architecture firm of Eidlitz and McKenzie, presently known as HLW International, a descendant and one of the oldest architecture firms in the United States.

== Early life and education ==
Eidlitz was born in New York City. He was the son of Harriet Amanda Lazelle Warner (1823-1891) and influential New York architect Leopold Eidlitz (1823-1908), one of the founders of the American Institute of Architects. His father was of Jewish descent; his mother was however Christian, and their children were raised in that latter tradition. Cyrus L.W. Eidlitz was the nephew of the builder Marc Eidlitz, and the grandson of the earlier architect Cyrus L. Warner (1789-1852, for whom he was named, and who was also the father of other successful prominent architects in the family of Samuel A. Warner (1822-1897), and Benjamin Warner). The young Eidlitz was educated in New York, then to Europe in Geneva, Switzerland and following in Stuttgart, (Germany), where he studied architecture at the Polytechnic Institute.

== Career ==
Selected works

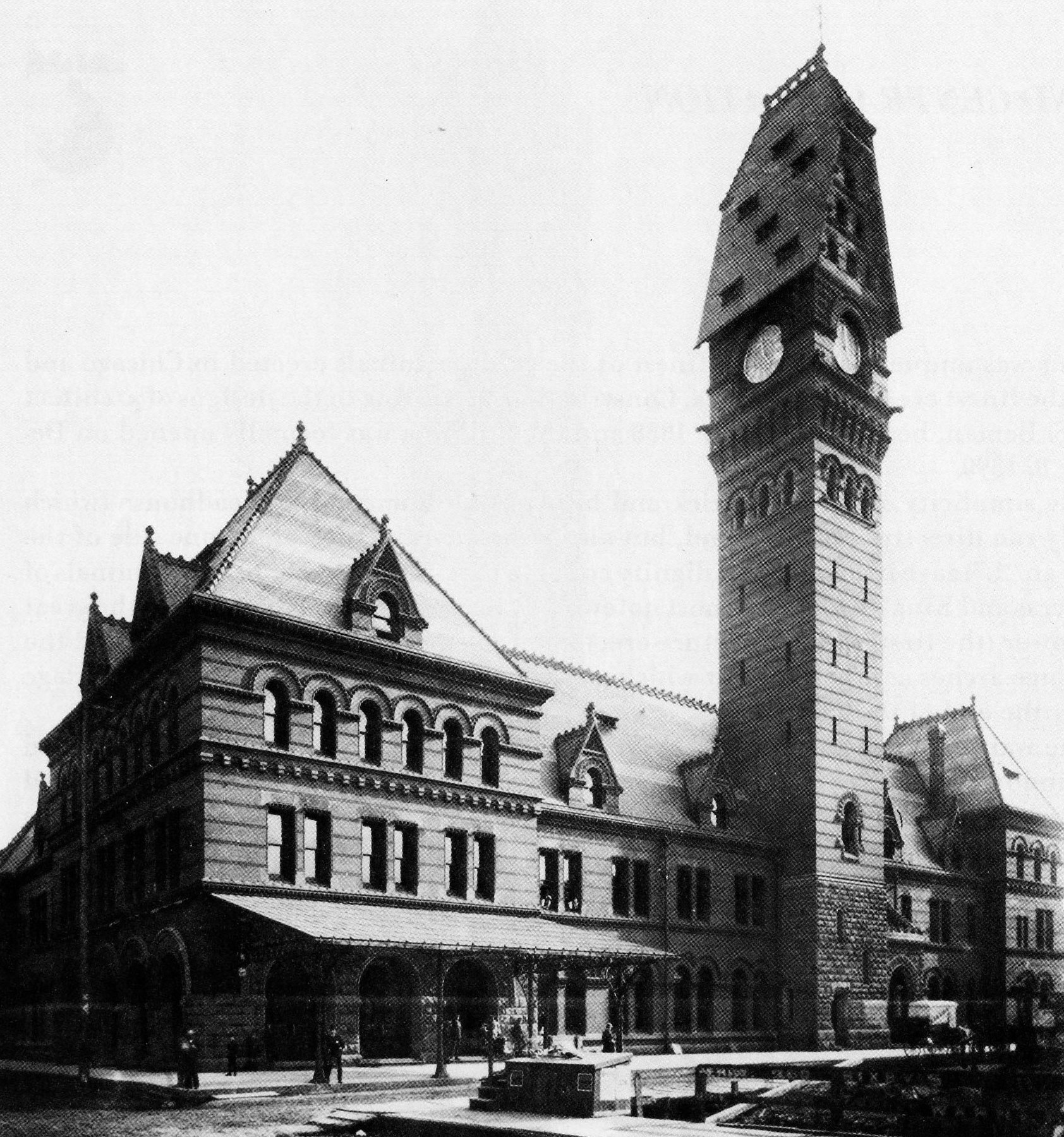
Dearborn Station (1885)

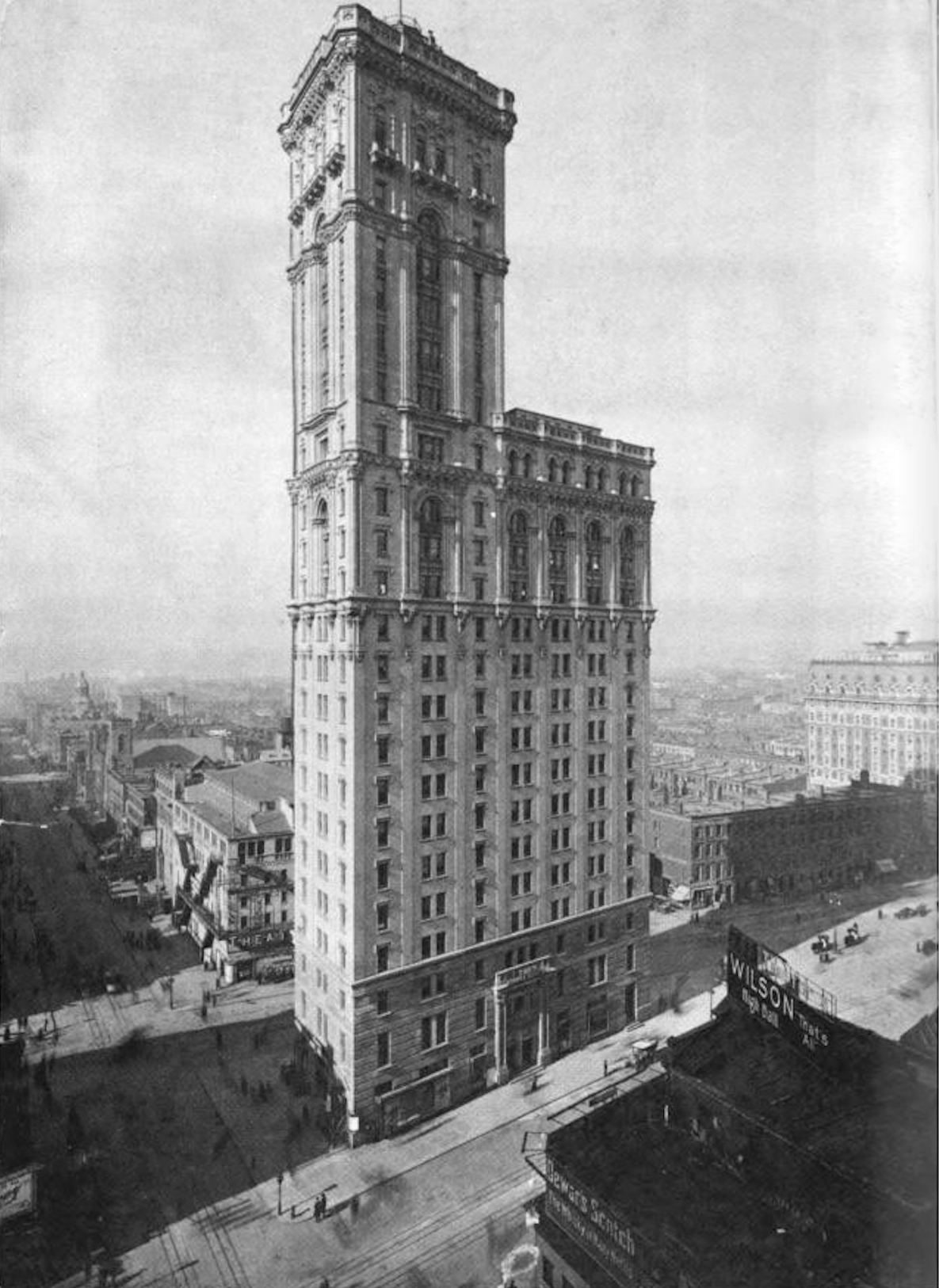
One Times Square (1904)

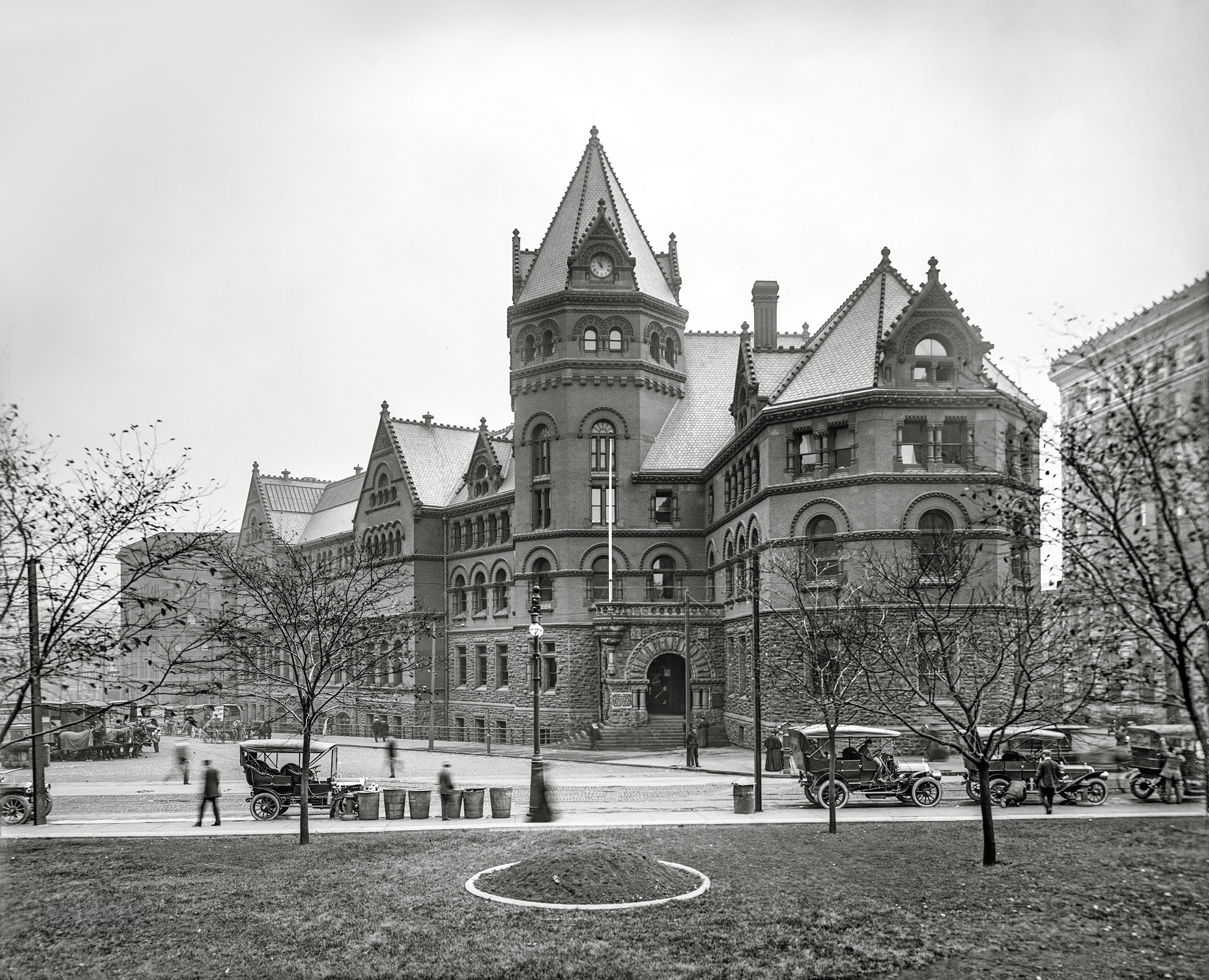
Buffalo Library (1887)

Eidlitz began working for his father. His first independent work was the 1877-78 reconstruction of St. Peter's Church in the Bronx after it was damaged by fire. It had originally been designed by his father. His early Gothic Revival and Romanesque Revival designs, including Dearborn Station in Chicago, Michigan Central Station (1887) in Kalamazoo, and the precursor to the current Buffalo & Erie County Public Library in Lafayette Square, show his father's influence. His Romanesque Revival design for the Metropolitan Telephone Building on Cortlandt Street (1886) was the first purpose-built telephone building in New York City. Another Romanesque design was selected for The Bank for Savings in the City of New-York which was erected in 1894. For the American Society of Civil Engineers' new Society House on 220 West 57th Street (1897), he used a French Renaissance and Gothic design.

By the turn of the century, Eidlitz embraced the Beaux-Arts style. In 1903, he formed Eidlitz & McKenzie with Andrew McKenzie, who had been a construction supervisor and engineer for his father's firm. Eidlitz & McKenzie was one of the first architecture firms that put architects and engineers on equal footing. Eidlitz & McKenzie worked primarily on telephone buildings, but their best-known design was for the New York Times Building (1903–04) for the publisher Adolph Ochs. Their design used their expertise in connecting buildings to subterranean infrastructure. The building, the second tallest in the city at the time, incorporated the Times Square station of the New York City Subway into its basement levels. Times Square was named for the building.

Eidlitz's other works include the Association of the Bar of the City of New York (1898), located at 42 West 44th Street in Manhattan, New York City. It is still occupied by its original client, unlike many other old New York City buildings. He also designed, with others, the Bell Laboratories Building, a National Historic Landmark in New York City, as well as the First National Bank on West Commerce Wtreet. The interior decoration design of the Arnot Memorial Chapel at Trinity Church in Elmira, New York is also attributed to him.

== Marriage and family ==
Eidlitz married Jennie Turner Dudley (1854–1935), who was the daughter of Joseph Dana Dudley (1822–1880) and Caroline Felthousen (1835–1902) of Buffalo, New York. They had two daughters who were both born in New York City: Caroline Dudley Eidlitz (1878–1962), who married Alexander Ladd Ward (1874–1948) on December 14, 1904; and Marion Dudley Eidlitz (1882–1952), who married John Butler Jameson (1873–1960) on November 19, 1913.

Cyrus Lazelle Warner Eidlitz died in New York City on October 5, 1921.

== See also ==
- Eidlitz
