= Iranistan =

Bygone Moorish revival mansion of P.T. Barnum

Coordinates: 41.174°N 73.202°W

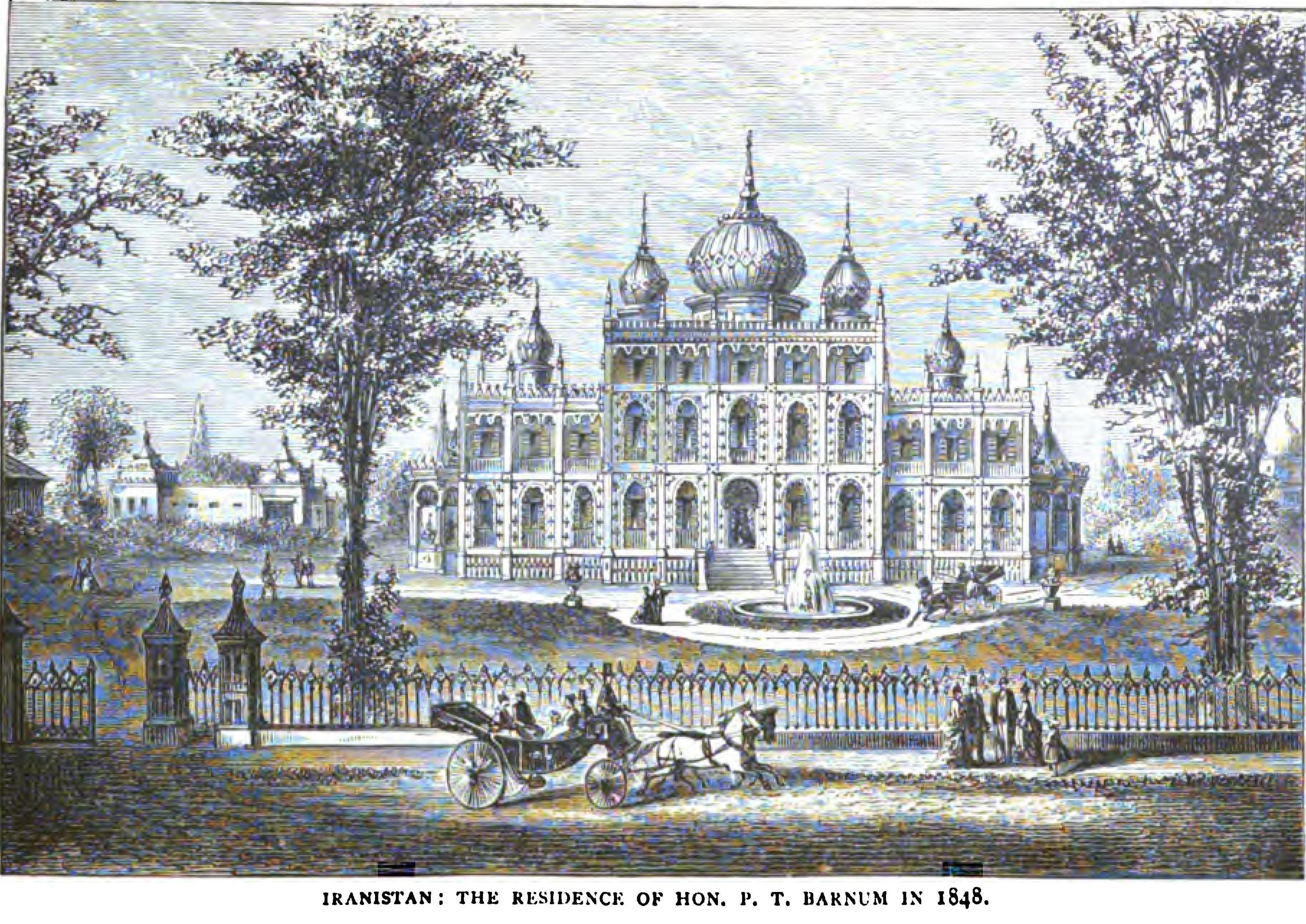
- Iranistan, Residence of P.T. Barnum, 1848
- Interactive map of the Iranistan area

General information
- Architectural style: Byzantine, Moorish, Indo-Saracenic architecture, and Turkish
- Location: Fairfield and Iranistan Avenues; Bridgeport, Connecticut, United States
- Completed: 1848
- Demolished: 1857 (fire)
- Cost: $150,000
- Client: P. T. Barnum

Design and construction
- Architect: Leopold Eidlitz

Iranistan was a Moorish Revival mansion in Bridgeport, Connecticut commissioned by P. T. Barnum in 1848. It was designed by Bohemian-American architect Leopold Eidlitz. At this "beautiful country seat" Barnum played host to such famous contemporaries as the Hutchinson Family Singers, Matthew Arnold, George Armstrong Custer, Horace Greeley, and Mark Twain. The grandiose structure survived only a decade before being destroyed by fire in 1857. It was one of five such fires in the showman's life that "burned to the ground all his accomplishments".

== Construction ==
"Barnum's most unique mansion" was designed by the New York architect Leopold Eidlitz, later a founder of the American Institute of Architects. It was a mix of Byzantine, Moorish, and Turkish decorative elements, inspired by the Royal Pavilion in Brighton, England, which Barnum visited shortly after its construction and admired. The word Iranistan is composed of Iran and -stan. The suffix -stan is Persian for "place of" or "country" and Iranistan means descended from Iran and Persian culture.

As such an architectural style had not yet become established in the United States, Barnum describes his efforts to have it built:

I concluded to adopt it, and engaged a London architect to furnish me a set of drawings after the general plan of the pavilion, differing sufficiently to be adapted to the spot of ground selected for my homestead. On my second return visit to the United States, I brought these drawings with me and engaged a competent architect and builder, giving him instructions to proceed with the work, not 'by the job' but 'by the day,' and to spare neither time nor expense in erecting a comfortable, convenient, and tasteful residence. The work was thus begun and continued while I was still abroad, and during the time when I was making my tour with General Tom Thumb through the United States and Cuba. Elegant and appropriate furniture was made expressly for every room in the house. I erected expensive water-works to supply the premises. The stables, conservatories and out-buildings were perfect in their kind. There was a profusion of trees set out on the grounds. The whole was built and established literally 'regardless of expense,' for I had no desire even to ascertain the entire cost.

By the time the house was completed in 1848 it had cost Barnum about $150,000.

== Description ==
The architectural extravaganza on 17 acres (69,000 m^{2}) of land was the first of four "famous" Bridgeport mansions built by Barnum. The mansion has been described as an example of Indo-Saracenic architecture, which was prevalent in the British Raj. The fanciful three-story oriental-style structure had numerous porches and arches, the whole thing topped by multiple onion domes. A circular driveway curved around a fountain in the front of the house and urns stood at corners of the lawn.

Iranistan had a greenhouse from which Barnum used to gather flowers for Sunday services at the local Universalist church. Barnum imported and kept a variety of choice livestock at this property and was soon president of the local Fairfield County agricultural society.

== Fire ==
When Barnum experienced financial difficulties, he had Iranistan closed and it was unoccupied for more than two years. Carpenters and painters entered to do some work and had been ordered not to smoke in the building. They smoked after-dinner pipes there in the evening. A pipe left to smolder may have ignited a blaze after the workmen were gone.

The fire alarm was sounded at 11 PM on December 17, 1857, and the house burned until 1 AM. P.T. Barnum was staying at the Astor House in New York City. In the morning of December 18, he received a telegram from his brother, Philo F. Barnum, informing him that Iranistan had burned to the ground. Barnum had retained some insurance on the unoccupied mansion, but he collected only $28,000. Many pictures and pieces of furniture were saved from the fire, although many of the salvaged pieces were damaged. After the fire, bank assignees sold the property, including the surviving outbuildings, to Elias Howe, the inventor of the sewing machine.

== Museum ==
The Iranistan seen in the A&E Network movie P. T. Barnum was a specially constructed model that now marks the entrance to the main gallery of the Barnum Museum. The museum also has a recreation of Iranistan's library that holds furniture designed by cabinetmaker Julius Dessoir and "showcases Barnum's distinctive taste."

== See also ==
- History of Bridgeport, Connecticut
