= St. Peter's Church, Chapel and Cemetery Complex =

Episcopal church in the Bronx, New York

St. Peter's Episcopal Church
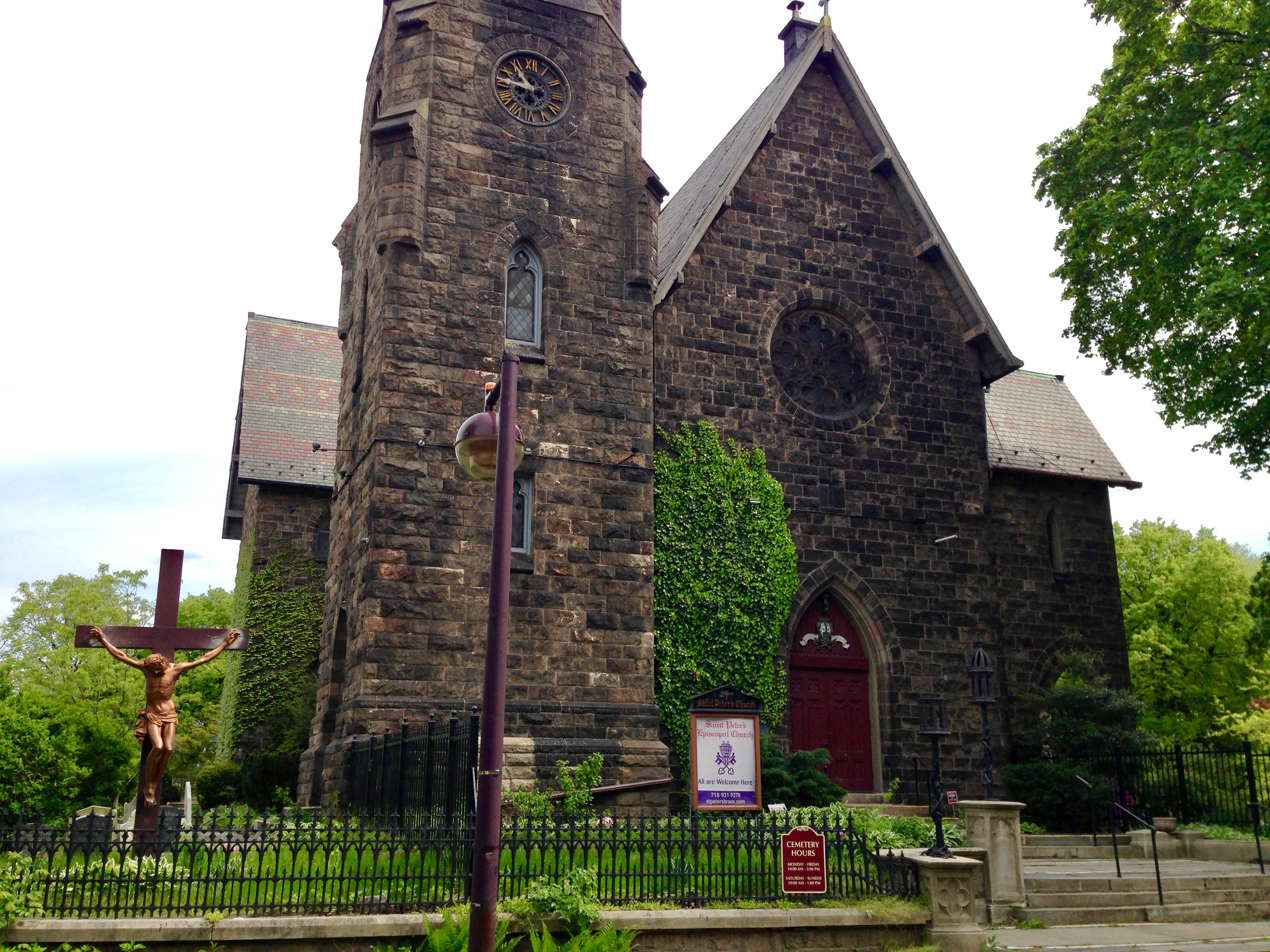
- St. Peter's Episcopal Church
- 40°50′17″N 73°50′41″W
- Location: 2500 Westchester Ave. Westchester Square, The Bronx, New York City
- Country: United States
- Language: English
- Denomination: Episcopal

History
- Status: Active

Architecture
- Architect(s): Leopold Eidlitz; Cyrus L.W. Eidlitz
- Style: Gothic Revival
- Years built: 1853; 173 years ago

Administration
- Province: International Atlantic Province (Province 2)
- Diocese: Episcopal Diocese of New York
- St. Peter's Church, Chapel and Cemetery Complex
- U.S. National Register of Historic Places
- New York City Landmark
- Location: 2500 Westchester Ave. Bronx, New York
- Area: 6 acres (2.4 ha)
- Built: 1853
- Architect: Eidlitz, Leopold; Eidlitz, Cyrus L.W.
- Architectural style: Gothic, Gothic Revival
- NRHP reference No.: 83001643
- NYCL No.: 0917

Significant dates
- Added to NRHP: September 26, 1983
- Designated NYCL: March 23, 1976

St. Peter's Church, Chapel and Cemetery Complex is a historic Episcopal Gothic Revival church at 2500 Westchester Avenue and Saint Peters Avenue in the Westchester Square section of the Bronx, New York City, United States.

It was built in 1853 to designs by the architect Leopold Eidlitz in the Village of Westchester, now the East Bronx. The church was damaged heavily by fire and reconstructed and changed by Cyrus L. W. Eidlitz in 1878. It is a Gothic Revival style, cruciform plan, church constructed of rock faced schist. It features a square corner tower with buttressed corners and an octagonal belfry.

It was designated a New York City Landmark in 1976. It was added to the National Register of Historic Places in 1983.

Burials in the graveyard predated the church and include members of the Dutch settlement Oostdorp, or East Towne (called Westchester by the English settlers in New Netherlands). There is also a memorial gravestone commemorating two unidentified soldiers who likely died during the Battle of Throgs Neck in October 1776.

In 2013, the Bronx Academy of Arts and Dance relocated from the American Bank Note Company Building to the chapel on the grounds of St. Peter's Church.

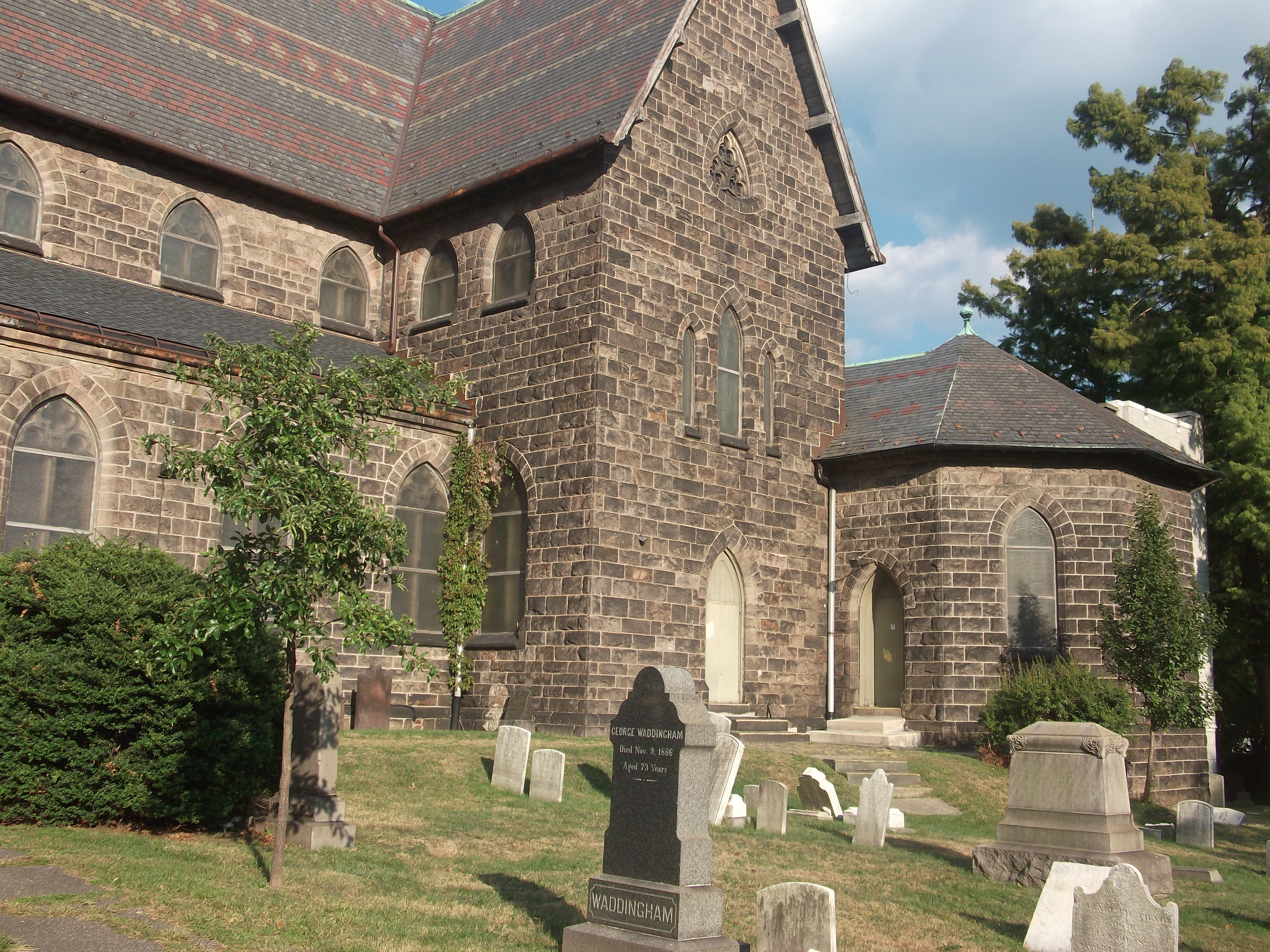
Side view

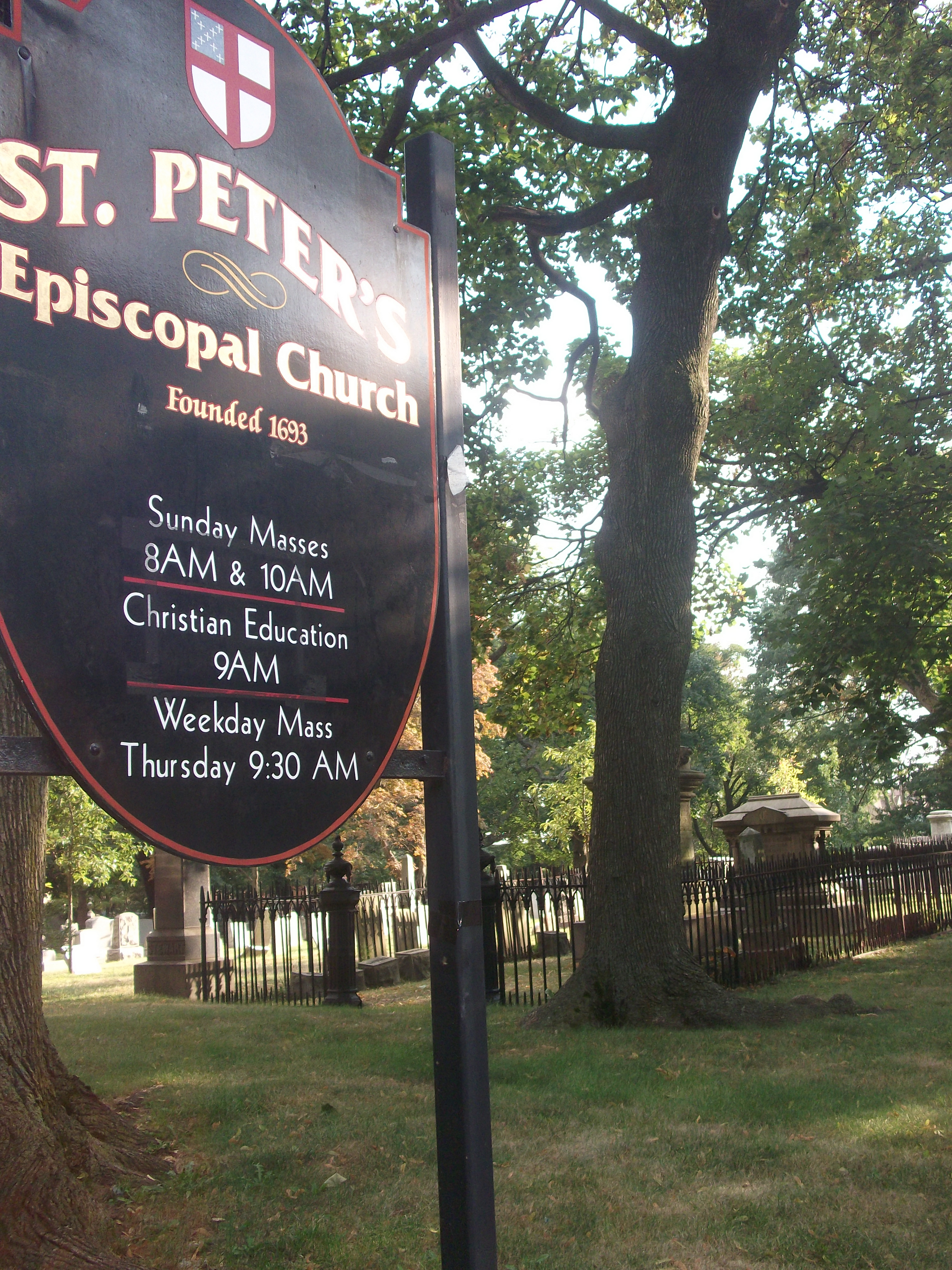
Sign for St. Peter's

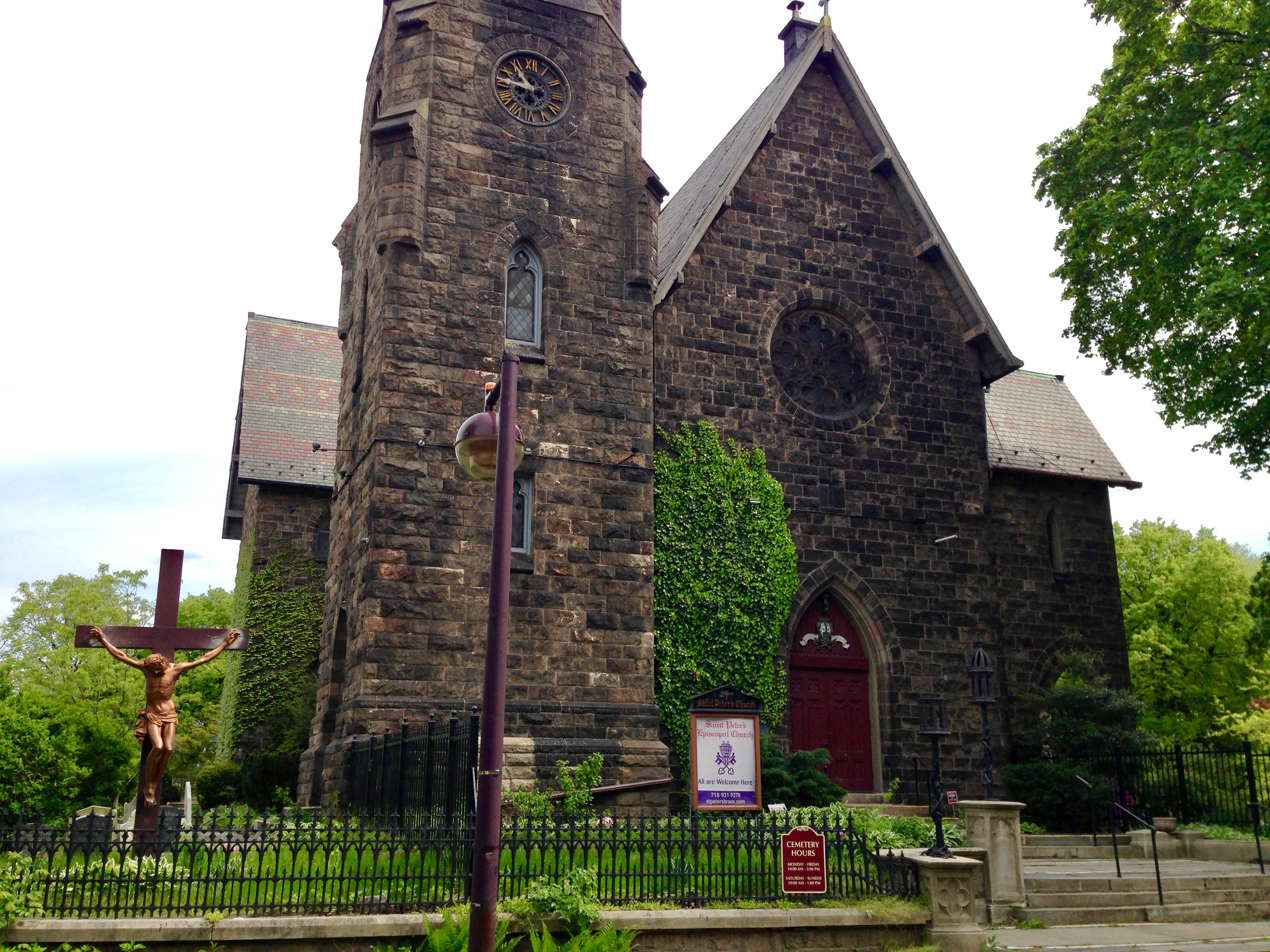
St. Peter's Church

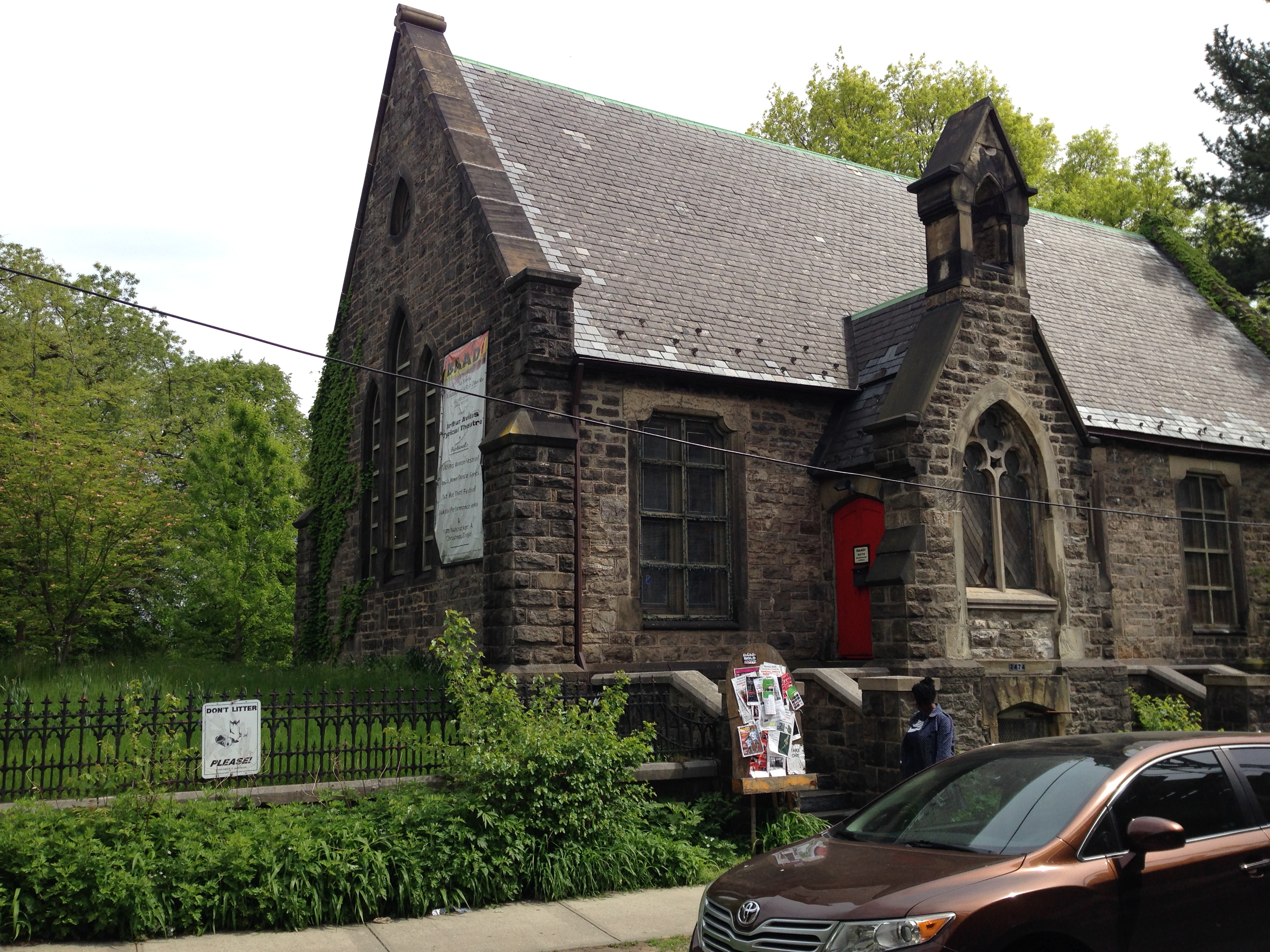
St. Peter's Chapel
