= St. John the Evangelist Church (Manhattan) =

Catholic church in Manhattan, New York

Coordinates: 40°45′26″N 73°57′51″W

The Church of St. John the Evangelist
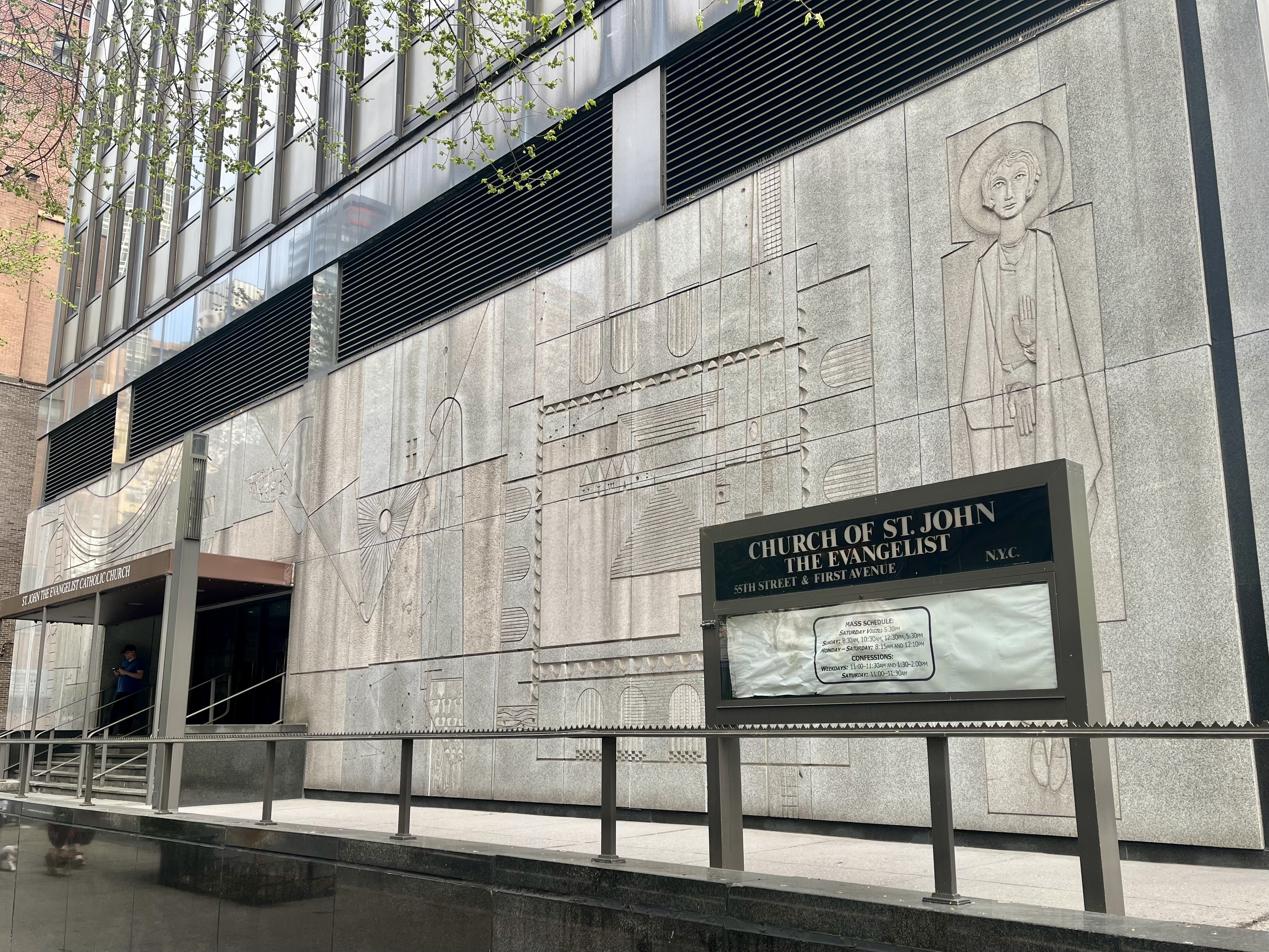
- The exterior of the church in 2025
- Interactive map of the The Church of St. John the Evangelist area

General information
- Location: New York, New York, United States of America
- Construction started: 1969 (for present church); 1907 (for school); 1947 (for garage)
- Completed: 1973 (for present church); 1908 (for school)
- Cost: $80,000 (for 1907 school); $900 (for 1947 garage)
- Client: Roman Catholic Archdiocese of New York

Design and construction
- Architects: Franklin A. Green and John V. Van Pelt (for 1907 school); George J. Sole (for 1947 garage); Ferrenz & Taylor (for 1973 church)

Website
- St. John the Evangelist Church, Manhattan

The Church of St. John the Evangelist is a parish church in the Roman Catholic Archdiocese of New York, located at 355 East 55th Street at First Avenue in Manhattan, New York City. The archdiocese expects to close the location in 2025, merging the parish into the nearby Church of the Holy Family.

== Parish ==
The parish was established in 1830 or, according to other sources, in 1841 "with a rather stormy history". The church originally stood on the site of the present St. Patrick's Cathedral, Manhattan. The first Catholic presence on the site there dated from 1810 when the Society of Jesus moved their academy to a fine old house on 50th Street and Fifth Avenue, where they created a chapel of St. Ignatius. The chapel was then occupied by Trappist monks from 1813 to 1815, and appears to have ceased function after that. Bishop of New York John Dubois reopened the chapel in 1840 for Catholics employed at the Deaf and Dumb Asylum and in the general neighborhood.

=== First building ===
A modest frame church was built and dedicated May 9, 1841, by the Rev. John Hughes, administrator of the diocese. Tickets were sold to the dedication to ease the parish's debt level, managed by a lay Board of Trustees, but ultimately to no avail as the property mortgage was foreclosed on and the church sold at auction in 1844. The stress is said to have contributed to the death of the church's pastor, the Rev. Felix Larkin. The experience was blamed on the management of the trustees and this incident is said to have played a significant role in abolishing lay trusteeship, which occurred shortly thereafter. The young and energetic Rev. Michael A. Curran was appointed to raise funds for the devastated parish, and shortly fitted up an old college hall as a temporary church. Curran continued raising funds to buy back the church during the Great Famine in Ireland, eventually succeeding and taking the deed in his own name. "The site of St. Patrick's Cathedral, hence, came to the Church through the labors of this young priest and the self-denial of his countrymen and not by the gift of the city." The debt was fully paid by 1853, by which time it had become clear that a larger church for the parish was needed elsewhere as its current site had been selected for the new cathedral.

=== Second building ===
Rev. James McMahon (later of Catholic University of America) had a new church built one block east of Madison Avenue, freeing the previous site for St. Patrick's Cathedral. The new church measured 140 by 90 feet (43 by 27 m) and contained an organ constructed under the direction of McMahon, who was a skilled musician. A fire on January 10, 1871, destroyed both church and organ, yet the church was rebuilt again within a year.

=== Third building ===
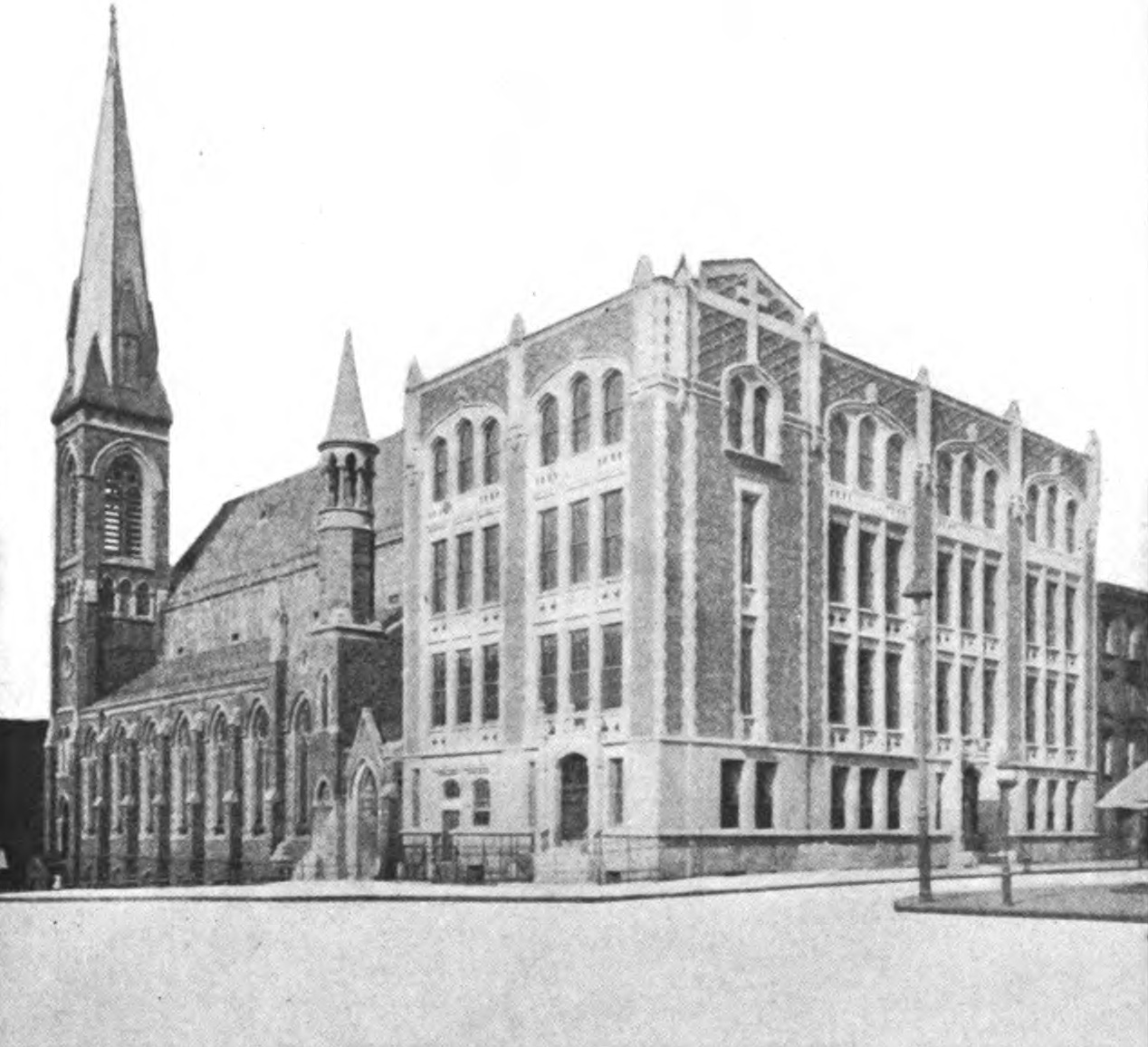
The third church (1886–1969) and the school (1908–1969), as seen c.1910

With the opening of St. Patrick's in 1879, St. John's parish was moved to East 55th Street at First Avenue. Under Monsignor James J. Flood, a new church was begun in 1880 and completed in 1886. An adjacent brick garage was built in 1947 at 344–348 East 56th Street to the designs of architect George J. Sole for $900.

=== Present location ===
The 1886 church stood until 1969, when it was demolished to allow construction of the Archdiocese of New York Chancery building, which contained a new space within the building for the church in 1973. The new building, which also included space for Cathedral High School, was designed by the architectural firm of Ferrenz and Taylor. In 2015, the parish of Our Lady of Peace merged into St. John's to form a new parish named St. John the Evangelist – Our Lady of Peace. The Our Lady of Peace church building was subsequently sold in February 2017, to the Egyptian Christian Coptic Orthodox Church community. It then became St. Mary & St. Mark Coptic Orthodox Church.

In January 2024, the Archdiocese of New York announced that its main offices would move in 2025 from the current Chancery building to a location adjacent to St. Patrick's Cathedral. Since Mass attendance was already low at St. John the Evangelist in the soon-to-be-closed Chancery location, the archdiocese merged the parish into the nearby Holy Family parish, effective June 30, 2024, to become the combined Parish of Holy Family – St. John the Evangelist – Our Lady of Peace.

== School ==
St. John the Evangelist Church had a four-story brick and stone school at the southwest corner of First Avenue and 56th Street built in 1907 to the designs of architects Franklin A. Green and John V. Van Pelt, for $80,000. The parish school opened in 1908, and was staffed by the Sisters of Charity of New York. The school was later demolished.

== Pastors ==
- 1840–1842: Rev. John Maginnis
- 1842–1844: Rev. William Nightingale
- 1844–1848: Rev. Felix Larkin
- 1848–1850: Rev. Michael A. Curran
- 1850–1879: Rev. James McMahon
- 1879–?: Msgr. James J. Flood
- 1987-2001: Msgr. Michael J. Wrenn
- 2001-2006: Most Rev. Robert A. Brucato, DD
- 2007–2024: Msgr. Douglas J. Mathers, JCD, JD
