= Samuel Adams Warner House =

Historic house in New York, United States

- U.S. National Register of Historic Places
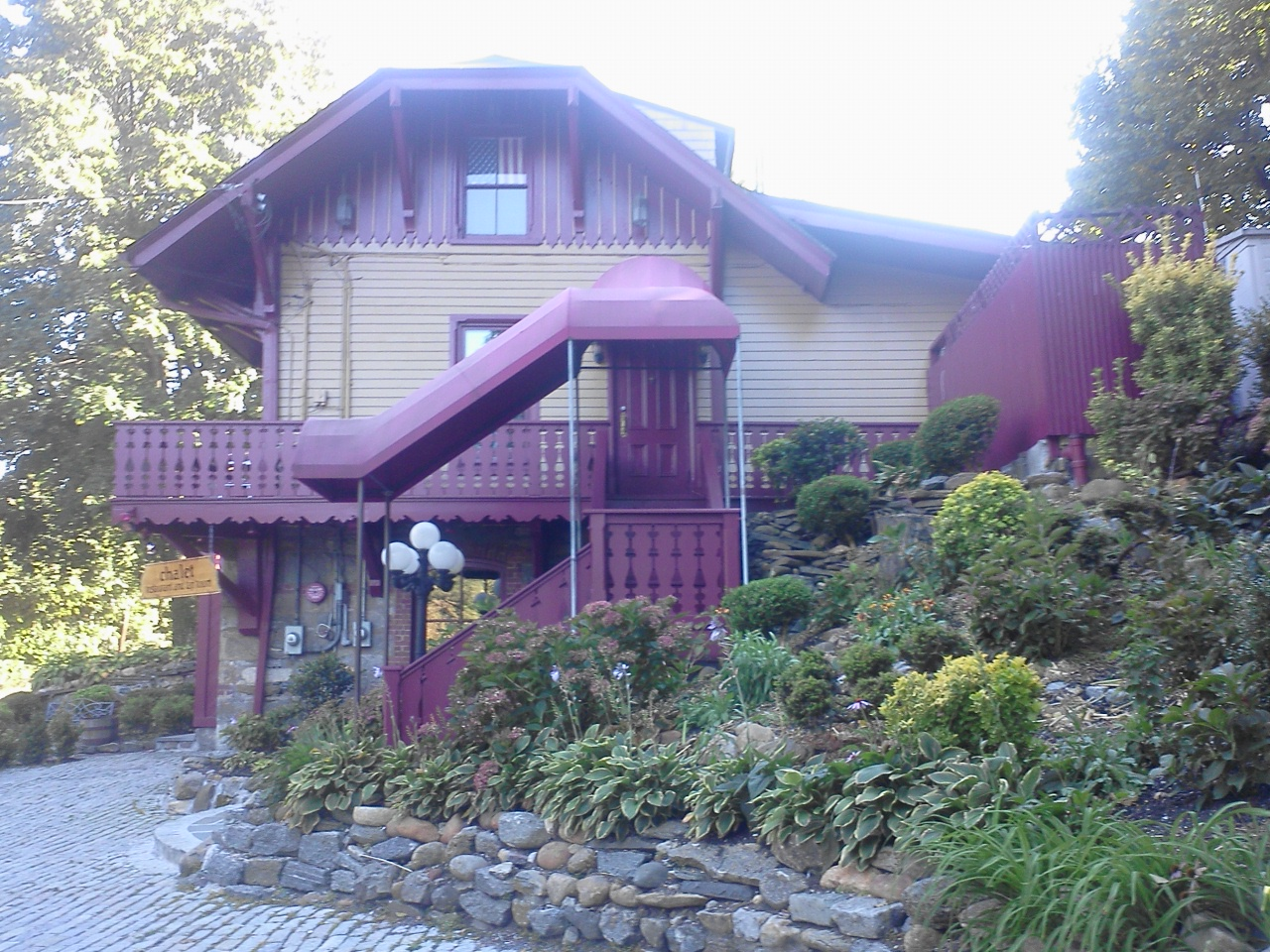

- Location within New York Location within the United States
- Location: 1 Railroad Ave., Roslyn, New York
- Coordinates: 40°47′34″N 73°38′39″W
- Area: less than one acre
- Built: 1875
- Architect: Samuel Adams Warner
- Architectural style: Chalet style cottage
- MPS: Roslyn Village MRA
- NRHP reference No.: 86002654
- Added to NRHP: October 02, 1986

Samuel Adams Warner House is a historic home located at Roslyn in Nassau County, New York.

== Description ==
It was designed by architect Samuel Adams Warner and built about 1875, and is a 1 1/2-story, vernacular Swiss chalet–style frame dwelling on a partially excavated stone basement. It features a broad, overhanging gable roof with jerkin heads. An L-shaped gallery projects from the south and west sides, and the gallery deck is embellished by scroll-sawn fascia.

It was listed on the National Register of Historic Places in 1986.
