= Microsoft Enterprise Agreement =

Volume licensing package

EA/SA (Enterprise Agreement/Software Assurance) is a volume licensing package offered by Microsoft. It primarily targets large organizations which have 500 or more personal computers. The minimum quantity was increased from 250 to 500 on 1 July 2016, but it remains at 250 for public sector customers. Other programs, including Open Value, Open License and Select License, are geared towards smaller organizations.

The Enterprise Agreement, whose price is tiered to the number of computers or users being licensed, is a three-year contract which covers all software licensing and updates for one client system. An option is given at contract termination to renew for one or three additional years.

Software products licensed under the contract include Windows 10, Microsoft Office and the core Client Access Licenses for Windows Server, Exchange, System Center and SharePoint, which allow the computer to legally access Microsoft servers over a network.

== See also ==
- Microsoft Software Assurance
