= Royal Mail Online Postage =

Royal Mail Online Postage (OLP), introduced in early 2006, but not promoted heavily until September 2006, is an online service provided by Royal Mail in conjunction with Lockheed Martin, where customers can print out an indicium (indicia in plural), the equivalent of a postage stamp, online onto a label or envelope of certain specified types, or plain paper, without having to buy a normal stamp.

== Purchasing ==
The user can print indicia, one at a time, for various Royal Mail services.

For payment there is a Royal Mail "Online Prepay Account", in which funds can be deposited with a payment card (credit or debit card). If the indicium is over £2.99, a payment card can be used without an account. Labels are in PDF format.

A name and address must be printed, with support for import in .CSV format. Addresses can be saved in an online address book. To check that an address will be printed properly (e.g., paper right way round in the printer), there is a "Try a Test Print" button on the "Print Postage" page.

== Validity ==
An indicium is valid if an item is posted by midnight of the working day following the day it was emitted. Refunds are available for unused indicia online within 14 calendar days of purchase, so long as the mail item has not been processed by the mail centre. If an indicium fails to print properly, e.g. due to an error or printer problem, a refund must be applied for.

== Posting ==
Mail that bears an OLP indicium can be posted in a Post Office, or a post box if a Certificate of Posting is not required. The service is available for international and parcel posting. Customs forms, required for international parcels, are on the Online Postage confirmation page.
