= Church of Our Lady of Peace =

Roman Catholic church in New York City

Coordinates: 40°45′46″N 73°57′49″W

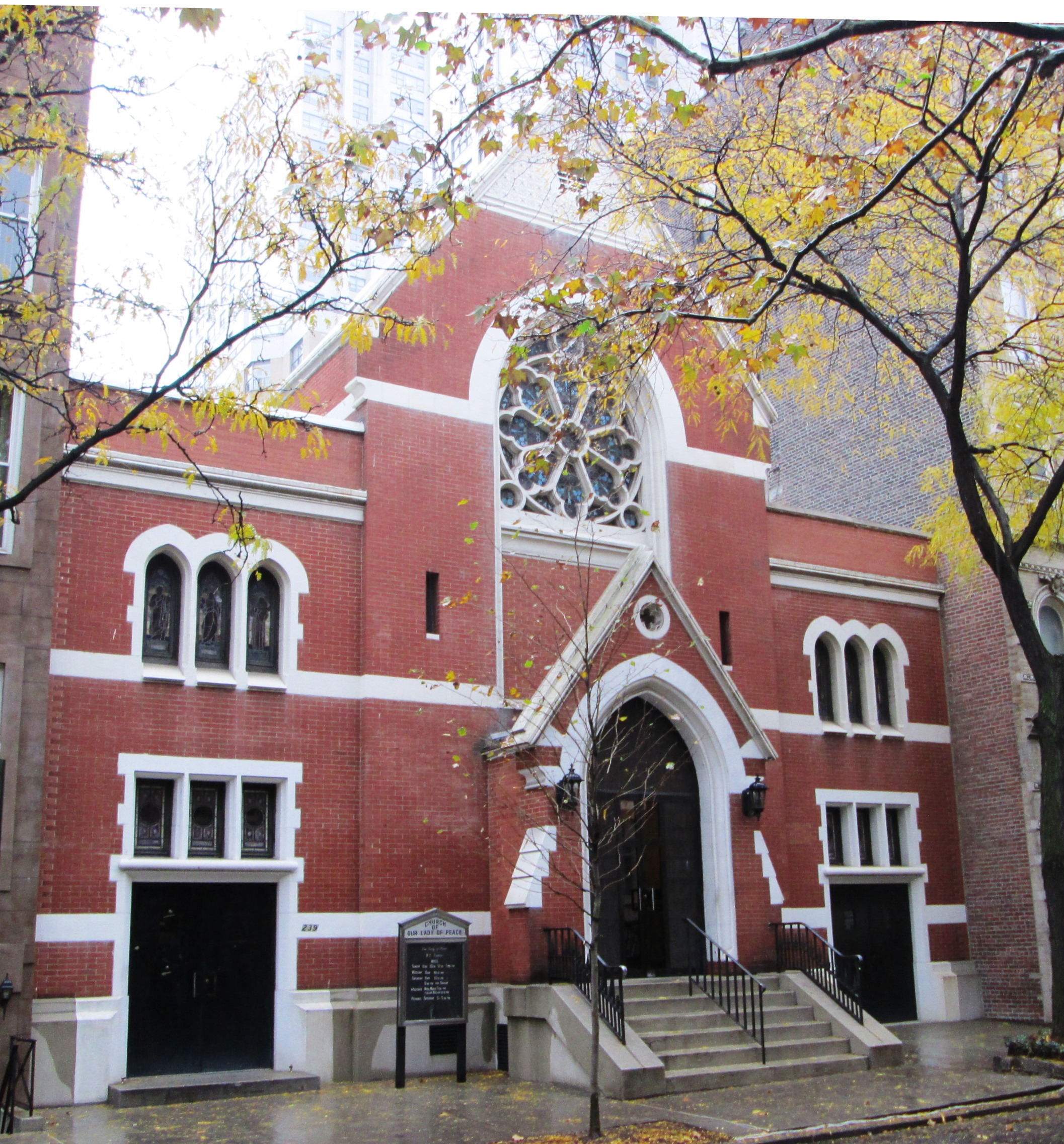
- (2013)
- Interactive map of the Church of Our Lady of Peace area

General information
- Architectural style: Victorian Gothic
- Location: Manhattan, New York City, United States of America
- Construction started: 1886
- Cost: $200,000
- Client: Church Extension Committee of the Presbytery of New York

Design and construction
- Architect: Samuel A. Warner

The Church of Our Lady of Peace is a historic Roman Catholic parish church of the Archdiocese of New York, located at 239-241 East 62nd Street between Second and Third Avenues on the Upper East Side of Manhattan, New York City. It was built in 1886-87 at the cost of $200,000, and was designed by Samuel A. Warner in the Victorian Gothic style for the Church Extension Committee of the Presbytery of New York. It served as the sanctuary for the Church of the Redeemer, a German-speaking congregation, then subsequently became Bethlehem Lutheran Church. before finally becoming the home of the newly formed Italian Madonna della Pace parish in 1918.

The church, which has been called a "gem", is located in the Treadwell Farm Historic District, designated by the New York City Landmarks Preservation Commission in 1967.

In November 2014, the Archdiocese announced that the Church of Our Lady of Peace was one of 31 neighborhood parishes which would be merged into other parishes. Our Lady of Peace was to be merged into the Church of St. John the Evangelist at 348 East 55th Street.

In February 2017, the Archdiocese with the blessing of Pope Francis, announced an agreement to sell the church to the Egyptian Christian Coptic Orthodox Church community. It then became St. Mary & St. Mark Coptic Orthodox Church. The first Coptic worship service was on March 5, 2017.
