= Leopold Eidlitz =

American architect (1823–1908)

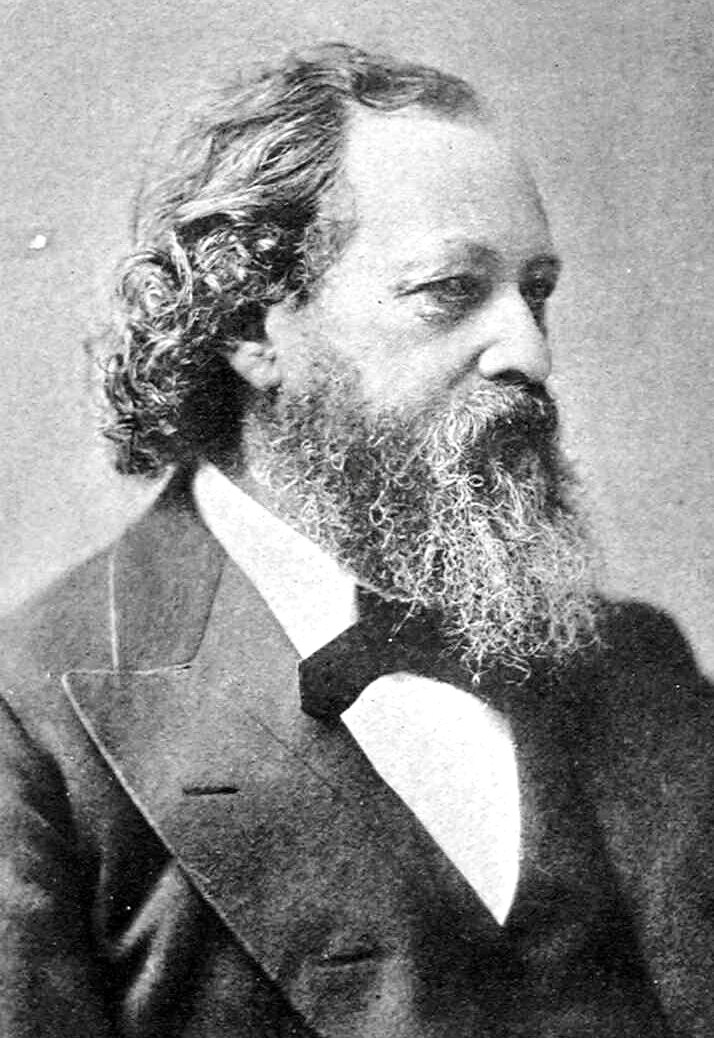
- Portrait in Architectural Record (1908)
- Born: March 10, 1823; Prague, Bohemia, Austrian Empire
- Died: March 22, 1908 (aged 85); New York City, U.S.
- Occupation: Architect
- Spouse: Harriet Amanda Lazelle Warner (m. 1845)
- Children: Cyrus L. W. Eidlitz
- Buildings: New York State Capitol; Iranistan; St. Peter's Church, the Bronx
- Relatives: Marc Eidlitz (brother); Cyrus L. Warner (father-in-law)

Leopold Eidlitz (March 10, 1823, – March 22, 1908) was an American architect of Czech-Jewish origin. He was based in the New York state. He is best known for his work on the New York State Capitol (Albany, New York, 1876–1881), as well as for major 19th-century commissions including "Iranistan" (1848), P. T. Barnum's house in Bridgeport, Connecticut; the Second Congregational Church of Greenwich (1856); St. Peter's Church in the Bronx (1853); the Brooklyn Academy of Music (1861, destroyed by fire in 1903); the former Temple Emanu-El (1866–68, destroyed 1927); the Broadway Tabernacle (1859, demolished c. 1907); the completion of the Tweed Courthouse (1876–81); and the West-Park Presbyterian Chapel on West 86th Street and Amsterdam Avenue.

== Life and career ==
Eidlitz was born in Prague, Bohemia, into a Jewish family; his parents were Abraham and Judith Eidlitz, and he had one brother Markus (later Marc) Eidlitz. He received his early technical training at the Prague Realschule and then continued his education at the Vienna Technical University. He enrolled in its short-lived business school, not its engineering or architecture curricula. Eidlitz emigrated from Vienna to the United States in 1843 and settled in New York. His brother Marc Eidlitz emigrated to New York three years later.

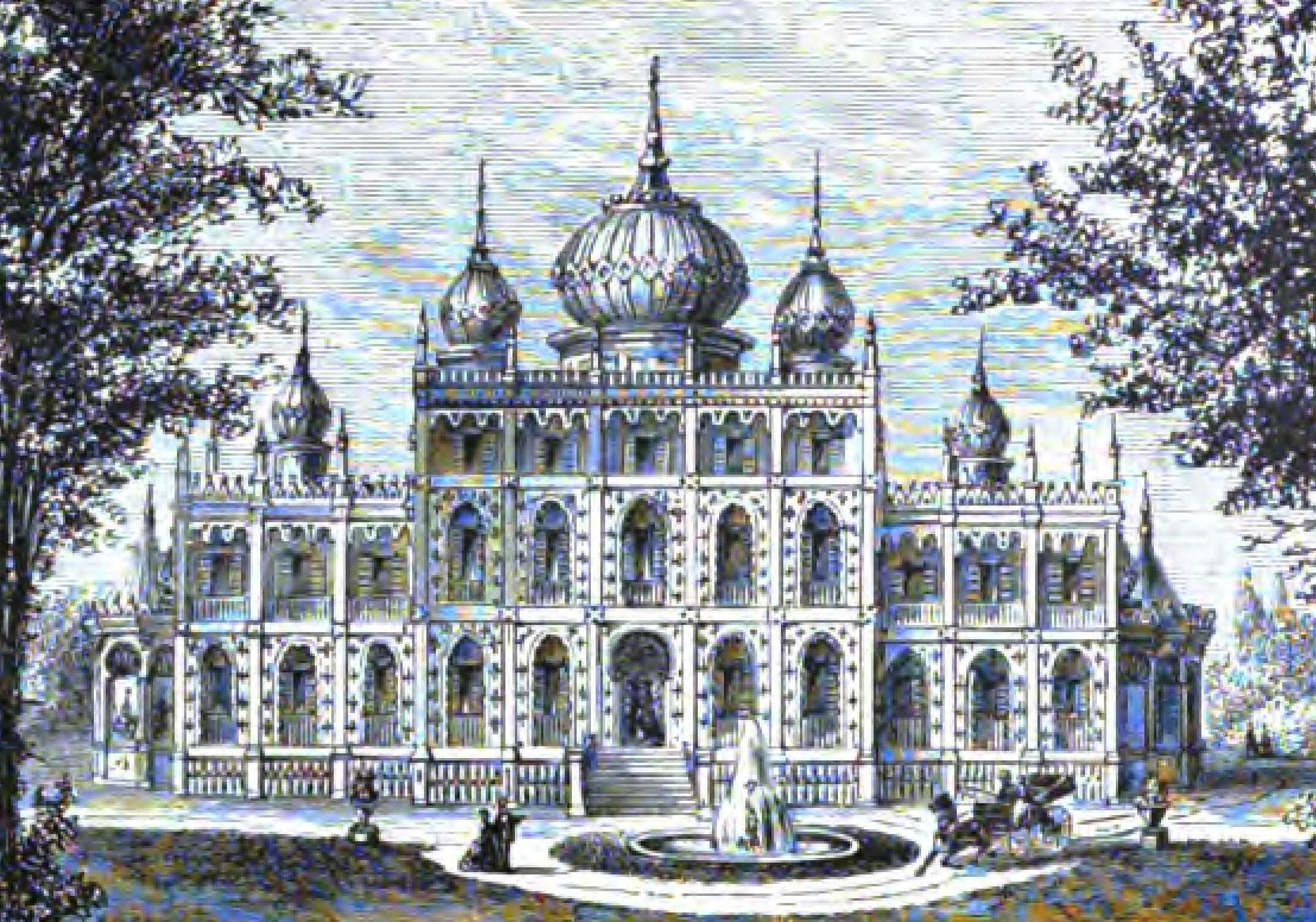
"Iranistan", home of P. T. Barnum, built in 1848 near Bridgeport, Connecticut

Eidlitz spent three formative years in the office of Richard Upjohn. He likely participated in his project of constructing Trinity Church at the head of Wall Street, which was under way. He also worked with the architect Cyrus Lazelle Warner, whose office was a few doors from that of Upjohn's.

In 1846 Eidlitz formed a partnership with the German immigrant architect Karl (now Charles) Otto Blesch, who had trained in Munich with Friedrich von Gärtner. One of their several joint commissions in New York was for St George's Episcopal Church (1846–49), still standing on the west side of Stuyvesant Square. Blesch designed the exterior, mixing Gothic and Romanesque styles, and Eidlitz designed the plain interior and the original openwork spires. The Episcopal congregation was so satisfied with the design that they rebuilt the church after a disastrous fire in 1865 following the same design, under Eidlitz' supervision. By that time the design was also influenced by Dr. Stephen Tyng, a new pastor hired for what had become a changing urban congregation, in a neighborhood largely filled with immigrants. J.P. Morgan, still an influential parishioner, helped support many social services programs started by the church.

Eidlitz's reputation was marred by his involvement, with H. H. Richardson and Frederick Law Olmsted, in the re-design of the New York State Capitol in Albany. In 1875, Eidlitz, Richardson, and Olmsted proposed changes to the capitol, which was already under construction to designs by Thomas Fuller. In 1876 state officials dismissed Fuller and hired the trio, causing tremendous controversy. Eidlitz designed the capitol's Assembly Chamber and its now dismantled vault.

Eidlitz was a founding member of the American Institute of Architects in 1857. In 1859, he joined the Century Association.

== Writing on architecture ==
Eidlitz wrote numerous articles published in such journals as The Crayon in the 1850s and the American Architect and Building News beginning in the 1870s. He published a major book The Nature and Function of Art, More Especially of Architecture (New York and London, 1881), which proposed an organic theory of architecture that wedded German notions of art and science to American transcendentalist concerns.

== Marriage and family ==
Eidlitz married Harriet Amanda Lazelle Warner in 1845. He had worked with her father Cyrus Lazelle Warner (1789–1852). Her mother was Elizabeth Wadland Adams (1792–1860), who, despite claims she made during her lifetime, was not descended from President John Adams. By means of this marriage Eidlitz helped secure his family's social place in the United States. Episcopal priest Stephen Tyng presided their wedding. They had seven children, but the first died soon after birth.

Their eldest son, Cyrus Lazelle Warner Eidlitz (1853–1921), was also an architect, designing the St. George Memorial House and founding the firm Eidlitz & McKenzie, designers of the New York Times Building, One Times Square (1903–05).

Leopold's brother Marc Eidlitz was the founder of a major construction firm, Marc Eidlitz & Son Builders N.Y.C. in New York, which built the St. Regis Hotel and many other projects. Marc converted to Catholicism and kept close ties to the German immigrant community, becoming president of Germania Bank in 1888.

Eidlitz has been called America's first Jewish architect. In his early work, as at the Shaaray Tefila synagogue, Eidlitz identified himself as Jewish to clients (1846–48). Other evidence suggests he later hid his heritage; his marriage was officiated by the Episcopal priest Tyng, and the Eidlitz children were raised as Christian, according to their mother's tradition. Eidlitz presented himself as simply German or Austrian and he Germanicized his parents' given names on American records. One of his daughters, Mari Imogene Eidlitz, was married in a Catholic ceremony in 1887 at St. Anne's Church in New York.

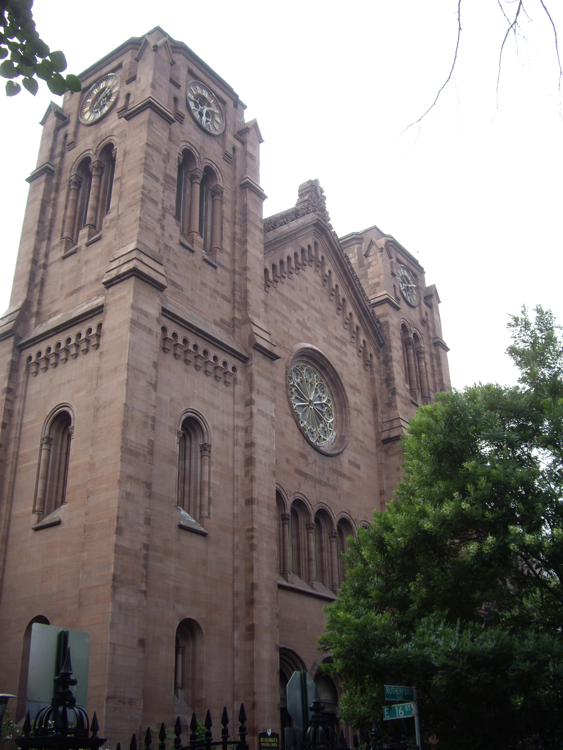
St. George's Episcopal Church on Stuyvesant Square in Manhattan, New York City. Eidlitz designed the interior, and supervised its reconstruction in 1865 after a fire.

== See also ==
- Eidlitz
