= Samuel A. Warner =

American architect

- Born: Samuel Adams Warner; 1822
- Died: 1897 (aged 74–75)
- Occupation: Architect
- Buildings: Samuel Adams Warner House; Marble Collegiate Church; Church of Our Lady of Peace
- Father: Cyrus Lazelle Warner (1789-1852)

Samuel Adams Warner (1822–1897) was an American architect.

== Biography ==
Warner studied architecture in his father Cyrus Lazelle Warner (1789-1852)'s office and partnered with his younger brother Benjamin Warner from 1862 to 1868. He designed dry goods merchant buildings for the H.B. Claflin Company, S.B. Chittendon & Company, Charles St. John, and H.D. Aldrich. He also designed the Marble Collegiate Church and several buildings in the SoHo neighborhood of westside Lower Manhattan in New York City's now designated Soho-Cast iron Historic District with significant examples of Cast iron architecture from 1879 to 1895.

Benjamin Warner is credited with designing 33 Greene Street at the northwest corner of Grand Street in 1873.

=== Legacy ===
Warner Avenue in Roslyn and Roslyn Heights, New York is named after Samuel Warner.

== Selected works ==
- Samuel Adams Warner House (1875), the architect's home, which he designed, further east in Roslyn, New York (Nassau County on the North Shore of Long Island).
- Marble Collegiate Church (1851–1854), a Gothic Revival architecture structure of an inter-denominational Protestant Christian church, at 1 West 29th Street on the northwest corner of 5th Avenue in Manhattan of New York City
- Presbyterian Church of the Redeemer (now Our Lady of Peace Roman Catholic Church) (built 1886–1887) at 239 East 62nd Street (between 2nd Avenue and 3rd Avenue), in Midtown Manhattan of New York City
- 16-18 Greene Street, Manhattan, New York City
- 20-26 Greene Street (1880), Manhattan, New York City
- 39-41 Worth Street
- 600 Broadway (1884)
- 545 Broadway (1885)
- 426-432 Broadway (1888-89)

== Gallery ==
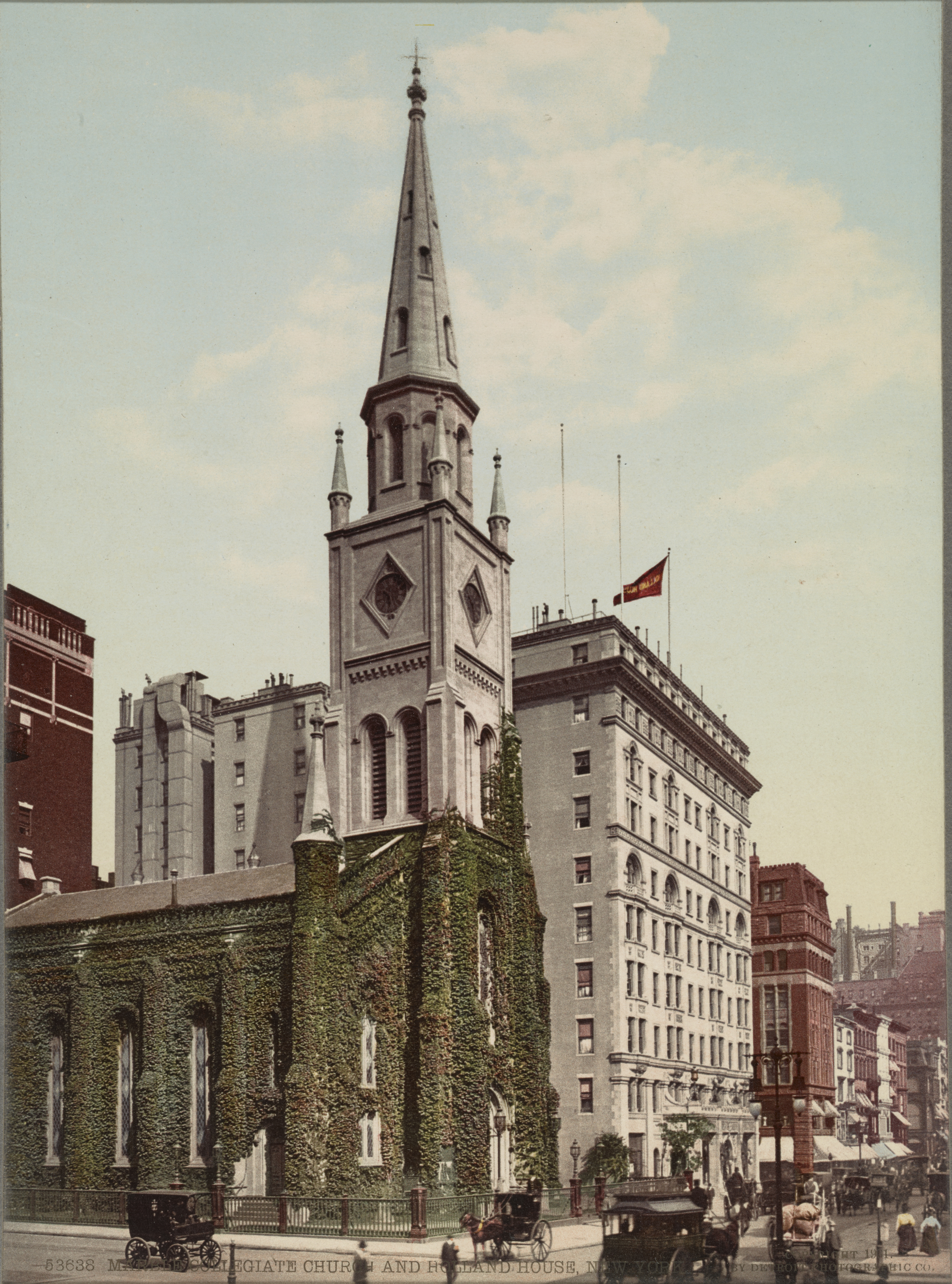
Marble Collegiate Church
(1851-1854)
1 West 29th Street
Manhattan,
New York City

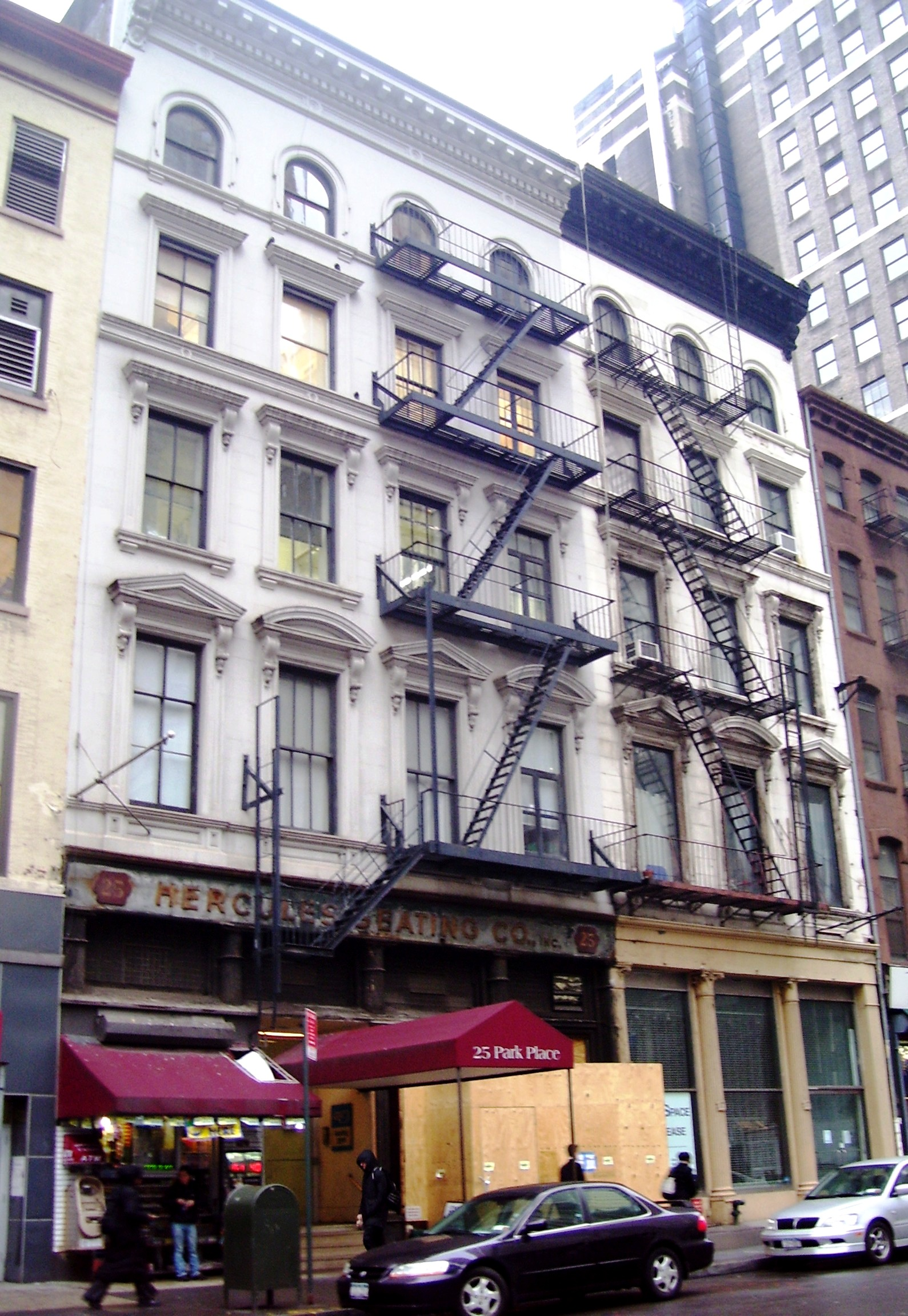
23 & 25 Park Place (1856)

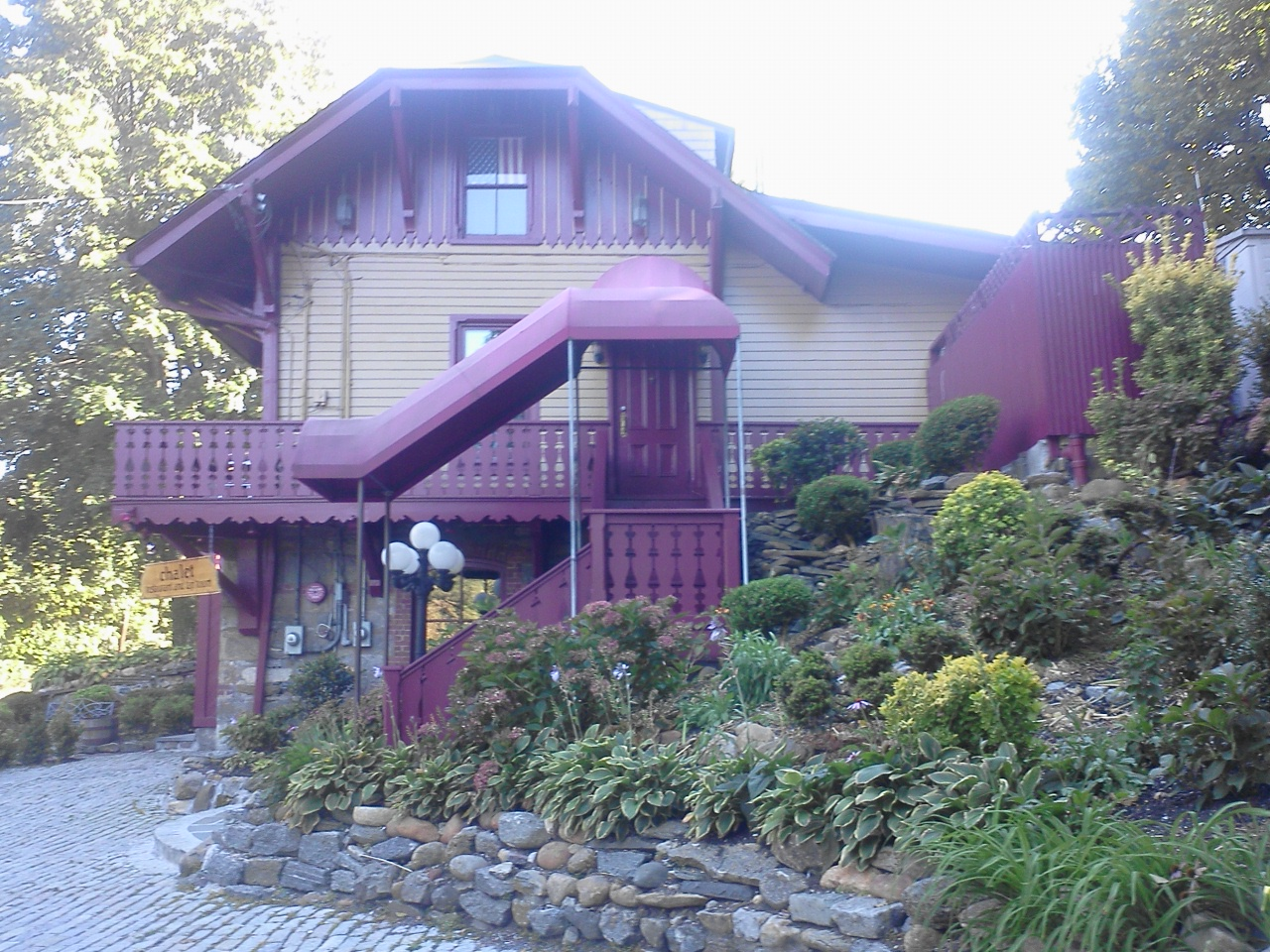
Samuel Adams Warner House
(1875),
(Roslyn, New York,
Nassau County,
North Shore,
Long Island,
New York State)

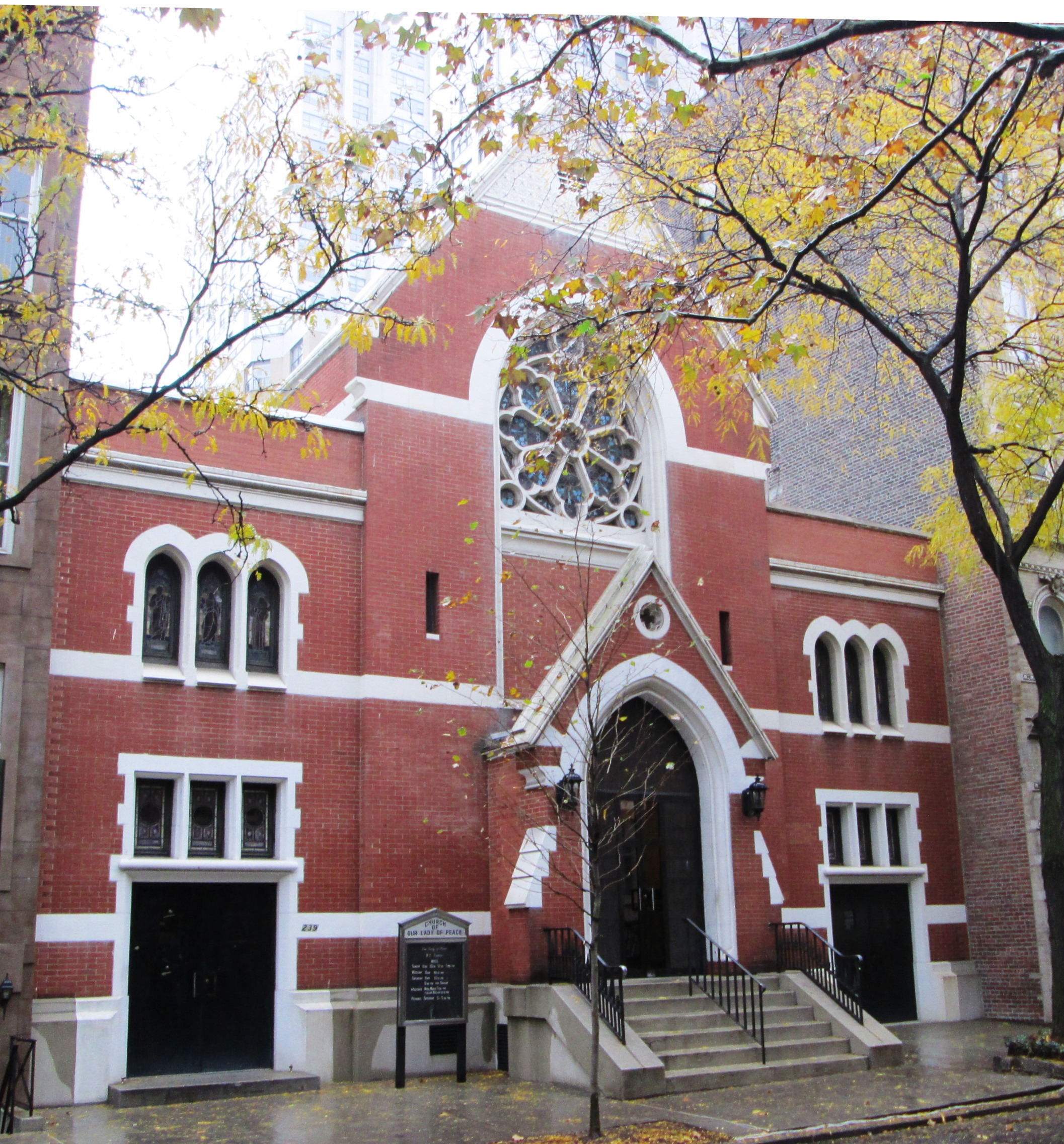
Presbyterian Church of the Redeemer (now Our Lady of Peace Church (Roman Catholic)
(1886-1887),
239-241 East 62nd Street,
Manhattan, New York City

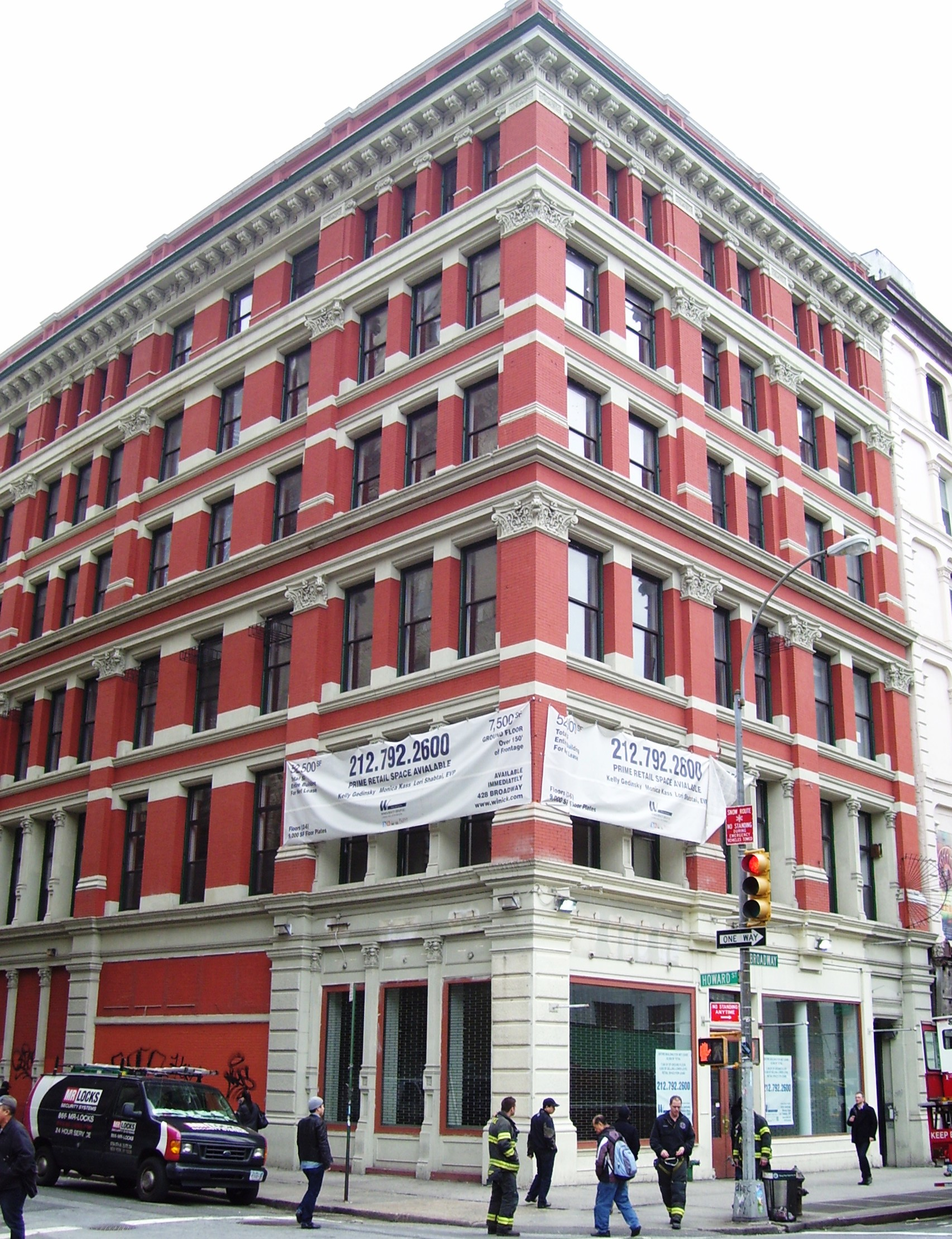
428 Broadway (1888)

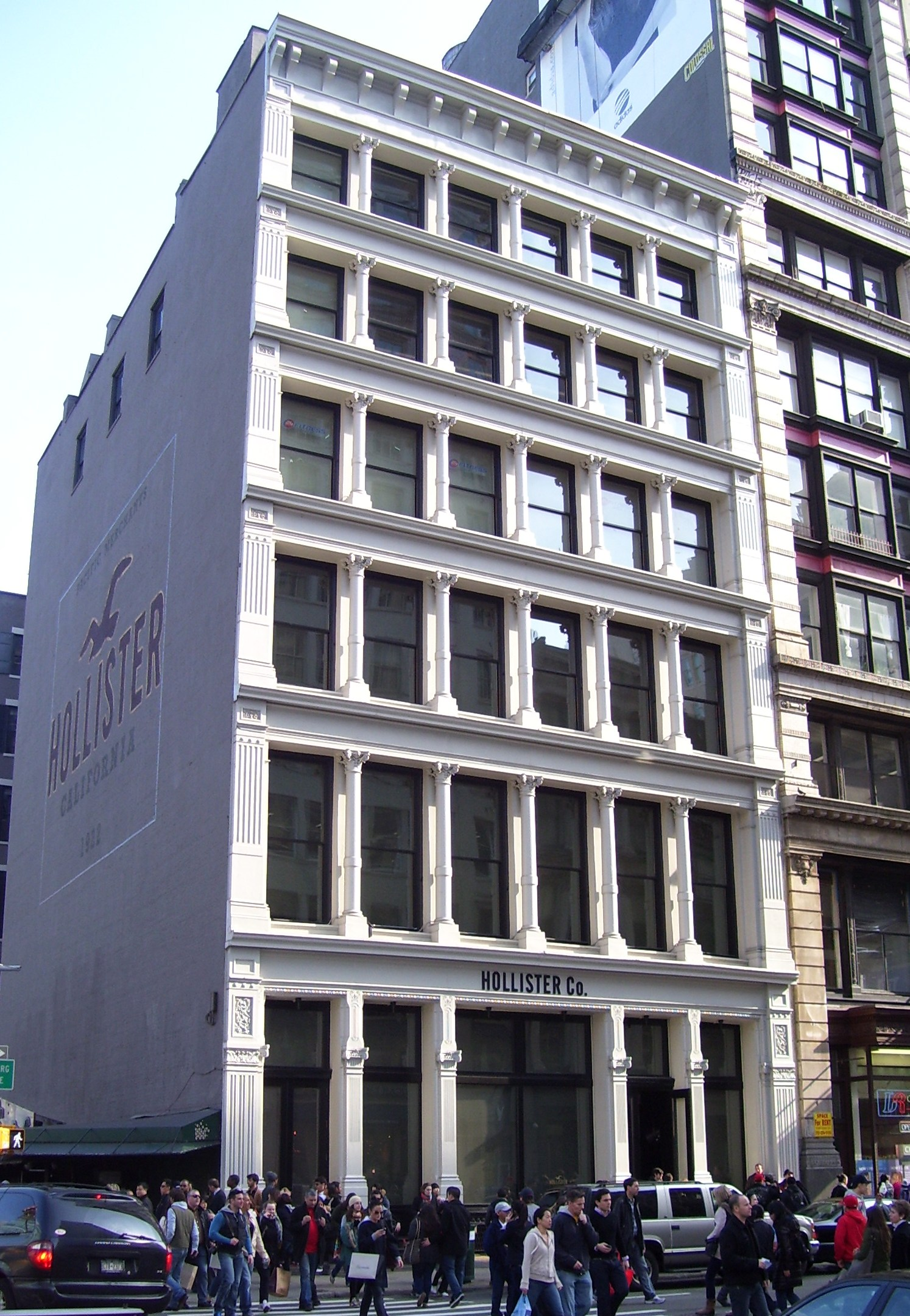
600 Broadway (1884)

== See also ==
- Cyrus L. W. Eidlitz
- Leopold Eidlitz
