= Open License Program =

Microsoft volume license service

The Open License Program is a Microsoft service that allows corporate, academic, charitable, or government organizations to obtain volume licenses for Microsoft products. It is ideally suited for companies with between 2 – 250 personal computers, but can accommodate organizations with up to 750 computers. Microsoft announced on 2 October, 2020 to end its 20-year-old Open License program for small and midsize organizations, starting on January 1, 2022.

== Programs ==
- Open License
  - Open License for Charities
  - Open License for Governments
  - Open License for Education
- Open Value
- Open Value Subscription

== See also ==
- Software license
- Microsoft Enterprise Agreement
