= Saclepea District =

District of Nimba County, Liberia

Saclepea Mah District is one of six districts located in Nimba County, Liberia.
