= Zerah Eidlitz =

Moses Zerah Eidlitz (Hebrew: אברהם משה זרח בן מאיר איידליץ, romanized: Avraham Moshe Zeraḥ ben Me'ir Eidlitz; before 1725 – May 17, 1786) was an Austrian Talmudist.

== Biography ==
Eidlitz operated a Talmud school from his residence. Besides teaching his pupils free of charge, he extended financial assistance to them, ultimately leading to his own impoverishment. Still, Eidlitz continued to pay the same Jew-tax assigned to him when he was more prosperous. It was only when he became actually unable to pay the required sum that he relented to the pleas of his friends, and stated his case to the primator Israel Frankl. Eidlitz, however, declined the roll of ducats that Frankl sent him. To compel the rabbi to accept the financial aid, Frankl asserted that he could not waive the tax if Eidlitz could afford to reject such a sum, and the rabbi ultimately acquiesced. After his death, a roll of ducats was discovered among his possessions, accompanied by a note instructing his family to return the money to Frankl.

== Work ==
Eidlitz wrote מלאכת החשבון (Prague, 1775), a manual of arithmetic in Hebrew, and אור לישרים (Prague, 1785), a collection of haggadic discourses.
