= Our Lady of Peace Church (Erie, Pennsylvania) =

Coordinates: 42.0811°N 80.11948°W

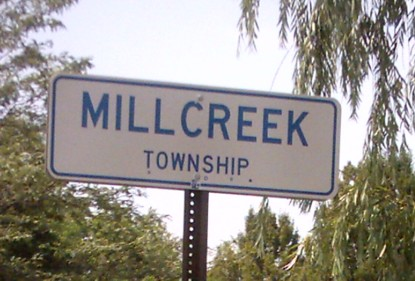
The Millcreek Township sign

Our Lady of Peace is a Roman Catholic parish with a church and K-8 school. It is located in Millcreek Township in Erie County, Pennsylvania.

The Our Lady of Peace Parish provides philanthropic services in the Diocese and to those in need who may reside outside of the county or State.

== School ==
The parish also has a school with approximately 404 students. Average class size of the school is around 20 students for Kindergarten through 8th grade. The Our Lady of Peace school is not one of the selected schools to close in the Diocese.

== History ==
Our Lady of Peace Parish was established on September 30, 1955, by Archbishop John Mark Gannon. On October 1, Archbishop Gannon appointed Father Daily as the founding pastor. The Millcreek School Board gave permission to OLP to use the high school auditorium for Sunday Masses.

As of 2006, the diocesan headquarters was also located in Millcreek.

== Diocese ==
Our Lady of Peace is a parish within the Roman Catholic Diocese of Erie. There are 39 parishes within the Diocese of Erie. The Diocese also has 15 Catholic schools within Erie County.
