= Marc Eidlitz =

American businessman

- Born: January 21, 1826; Prague, Bohemia
- Died: April 15, 1892 (aged 66); Manhattan
- Occupation: Builder
- Known for: founder of Marc Eidlitz & Son
- Children: 5
- Parent(s): Judith and Abraham Eidlitz
- Family: Leopold Eidlitz (brother); Cyrus L. W. Eidlitz (nephew)

Marc Eidlitz (21 January 1826 – 15 April 1892) was a builder active in New York City, where he was prominent in the construction industry, in partnership with his son Otto Eidlitz (1860–1928).

== Biography ==
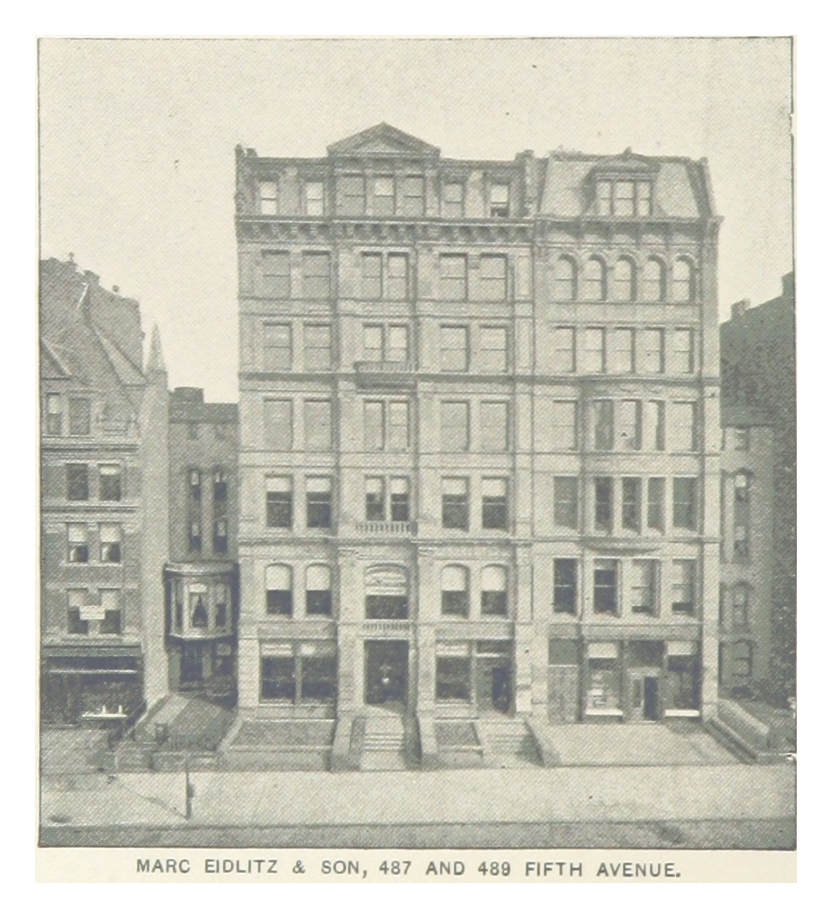
487 and 489 Fifth Avenue buildings built by Eidlitz & Son

Marc was born Markus to a Jewish family in Prague, Bohemia. He emigrated to the United States in 1846 with his mother Judith Eidlitz after the death of his father Abraham. Having served a four-year apprenticeship, he set up in business for himself in 1852 - the year of his marriage - and founded the construction firm, Marc Eidlitz & Son in New York City.

The firm built the St. Regis Hotel and many other projects. Through his influence, the Masons Builders' Association of New York played a major role in founding the National Association of Builders. In New York, he was President of the Building Trades' Club and of the Germanic Savings Bank.

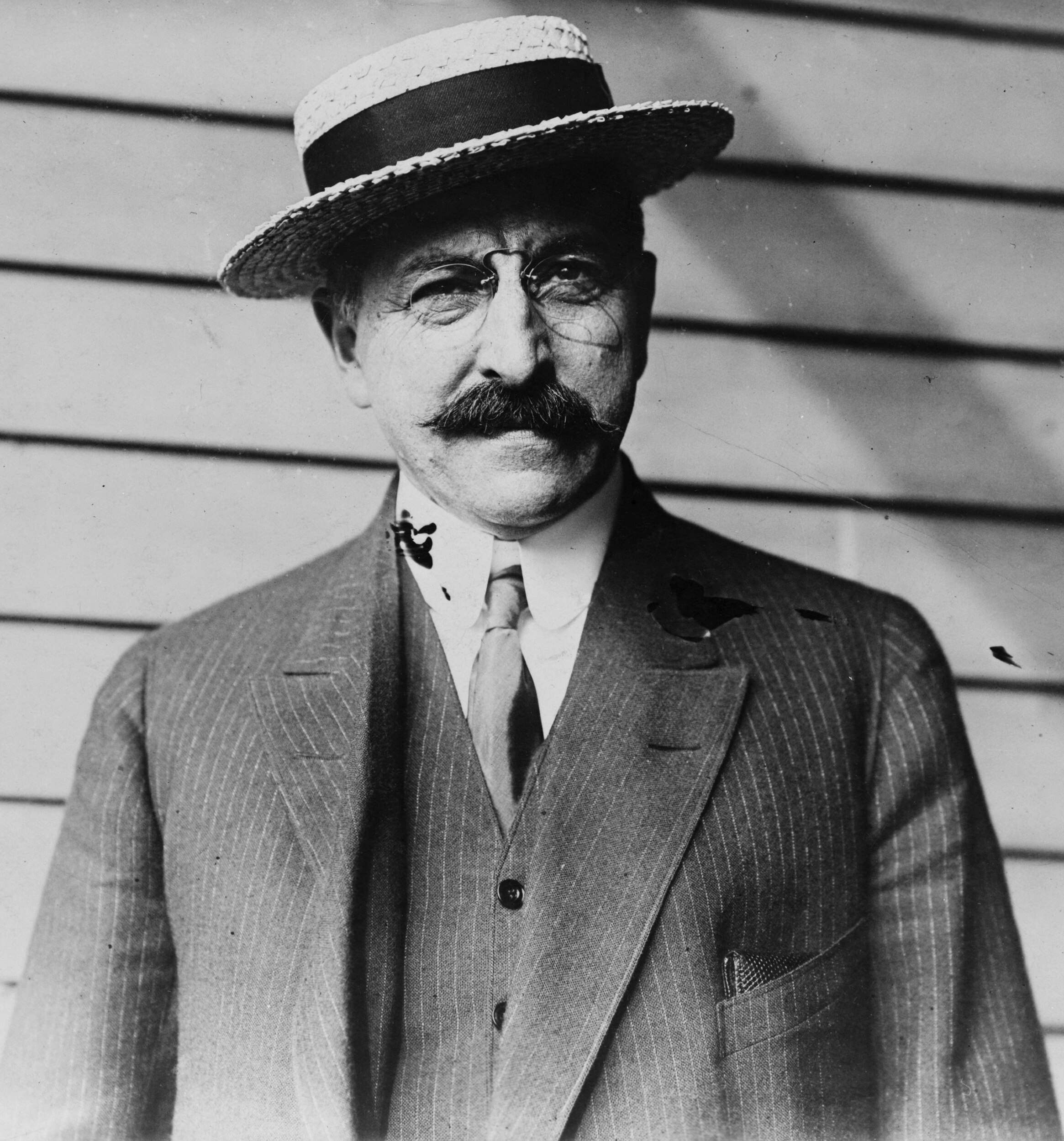
Otto Eidlitz in 1920

Eidlitz made his home at 123 East 72nd Street, where he died. He had four sons and a daughter. His son Otto Eidlitz took over the business after he died. His brother Leopold Eidlitz was a well-known architect, as was Leopold's son, Cyrus L. W. Eidlitz. Marc converted to Catholicism and kept close ties to the German immigrant community, becoming president of Germania Bank in 1888.

== Selected commercial commissions ==
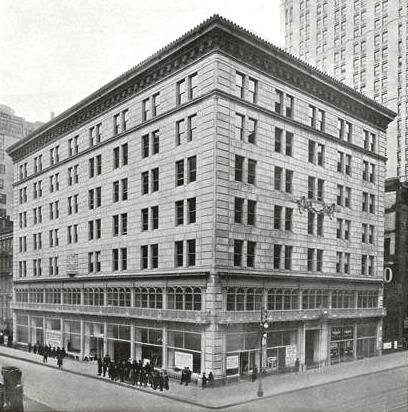
Astor House Building

The following structures erected by Eidlitz were all in New York City, unless otherwise identified.

- A mission on 20th Street, commissioned by William Colgate
- Broadway Tabernacle (1857–58)
- Lord and Taylor Building, Broadway and Grand Street
- The German Hospital (now Lenox Hill Hospital at another site)
- Saint Vincent's Hospital
- Home of the Sisters of Bon Secours
- Church of the Incarnation, Madison Avenue and 35th Street
- Temple Emanu-El, former building at Fifth Avenue and 43rd Street
- St. George's clergy house, 16th Street
- Astor Library
- Steinway Hall
- Gallatin Bank
- Metropolitan Opera House (J. Cleaveland Cady, architect, 1883)
- Seamen's Savings Bank
- Eagle Fire Insurance Company
- Schermerhorn Building, 376 Lafayette Street (Henry J. Hardenbergh, architect, 1889)
- Astor Building
- Eden Musée
- Western Electric Building
- Lancashire Fire Insurance Company
- Empire Building, Broadway and Rector Street
- Germania Bank Building, 190 Bowery (Robert Maynicke, architect, 1898)

== Private dwellings ==
- J. Pierpont Morgan House
- Ogden Goelet House
- Rober L. Stuart House
