= John M. Berrien =

American politician (1781–1856)

John Macpherson Berrien
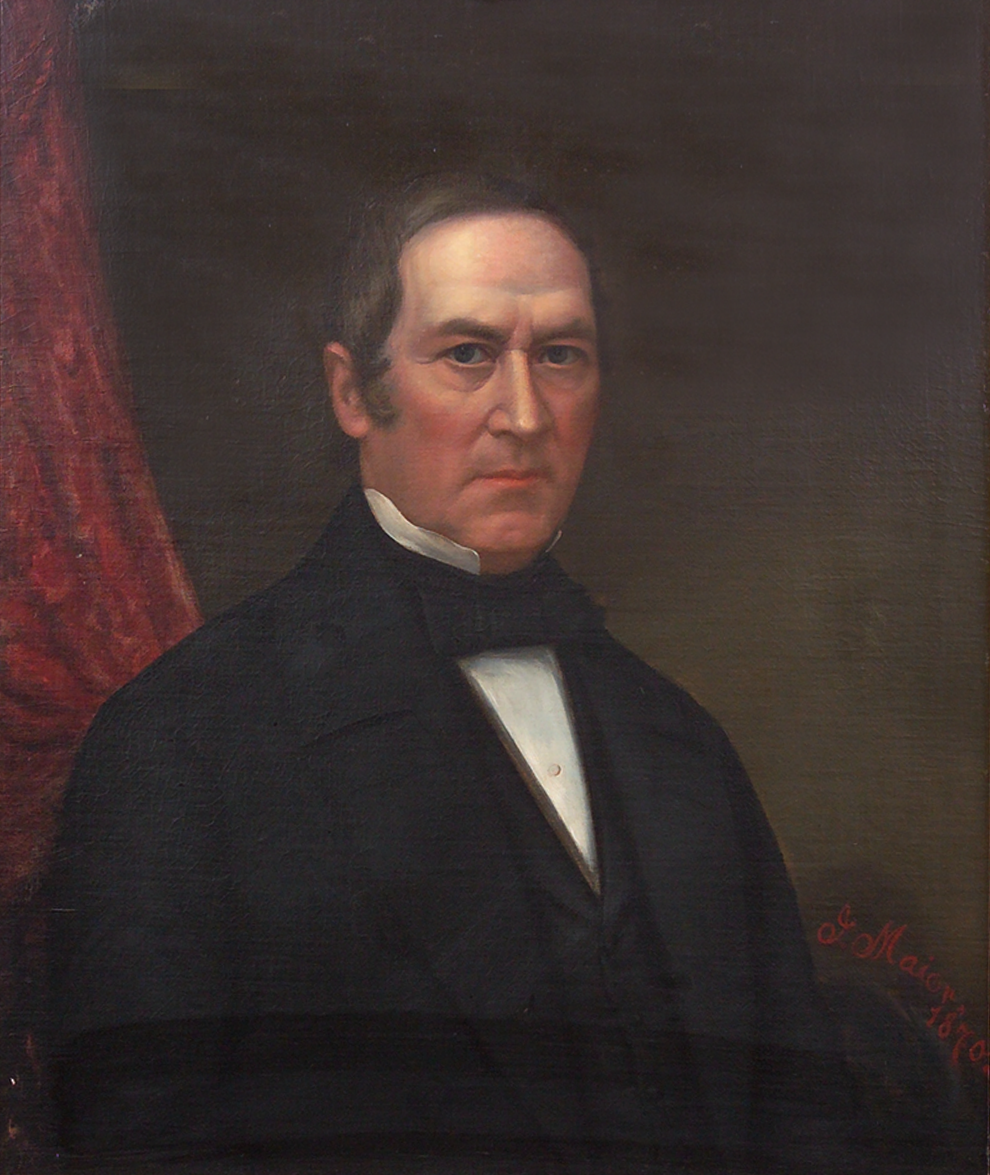

United States Senator from Georgia
- In office November 13, 1845 – May 28, 1852
- Preceded by: Vacant
- Succeeded by: Robert M. Charlton
- In office March 4, 1841 – May 28, 1845
- Preceded by: Wilson Lumpkin
- Succeeded by: Vacant
- In office March 4, 1825 – March 9, 1829
- Preceded by: John Elliott
- Succeeded by: John Forsyth

10th United States Attorney General
- In office March 9, 1829 – June 22, 1831
- President: Andrew Jackson
- Preceded by: William Wirt
- Succeeded by: Roger B. Taney

Member of the Georgia Senate from Chatham County
- In office 1822–1823
- Preceded by: Edward Harden
- Succeeded by: William Davies

Judge of the Eastern Judicial Circuit of Georgia
- In office 1810 – January 30, 1821

Solicitor of the Eastern Judicial Circuit of Georgia
- In office 1809–1810

Personal details
- Born: John Macpherson Berrien; August 23, 1781 Rocky Hill, New Jersey, U.S.
- Died: January 1, 1856 (aged 74) Savannah, Georgia, U.S.
- Resting place: Laurel Grove Cemetery
- Party: Federalist (before 1824); Democratic (1824–1834); Whig (1834–1855); Know Nothing (1855–1856)
- Other political affiliations: Southern Rights
- Spouse(s): Eliza Richardson Anciaux; Eliza Cecil Hunter
- Education: Princeton University (BA)

Military service
- Rank: Colonel
- Unit: Georgia Hussars
- Battles/wars: War of 1812

John Macpherson Berrien (August 23, 1781 – January 1, 1856) was a United States senator from Georgia and Attorney General of the United States during the presidency of Andrew Jackson.

== Early life and education ==
Berrien was born on August 23, 1781, at Rockingham, his parents' home in Rocky Hill, New Jersey. His father was Major John Berrien and grandfather was Judge John Berrien, and his mother was Margaret Macpherson. The next year his parents moved with him to Savannah, Georgia, in 1782. His mother died three years later.

Berrien graduated from Princeton College in 1796, studied law (read the law) in Savannah, and was admitted to the bar at the age of 18. He moved to Louisville, Georgia, where he started a practice in 1799.

== Political career ==
He returned to Savannah, where he was elected solicitor of the eastern judicial circuit of Georgia in 1809. He was elected as judge of the same circuit in 1810, serving until January 30, 1821, when he resigned.

He served as captain of the Georgia Hussars, a Savannah volunteer company, in the War of 1812. He later was a colonel in the 1st Georgia Cavalry.

A leader among Georgia's Federalists, Berrien supported Rufus King in the 1816 United States presidential election and later served a member of the Georgia Senate from 1822 to 1823. He was elected as a Jacksonian Democrat to the United States Senate in 1824 and served from March 4, 1825, succeeding his fellow Federalist John Elliott. In The Antelope case of 1824, he argued against the freedom of slaves captured at sea noting slavery "lay at the foundation of the Constitution" and that slaves "constitute the very foundation of your union".

On March 9, 1829, he resigned from the Senate to accept the position of Attorney General in the Cabinet of President Andrew Jackson. His first assignment was to prosecute former Treasury Fourth Auditor Tobias Watkins for embezzlement of public funds. Berrien secured a conviction at a high-profile trial that same year. Later Berrien supported states' rights in the Nullification Crisis. In the case of the Negro Seamen Acts, he considered the acts to be appropriate exercises of the states' police powers, and beyond the reach of the federal government. He resigned from the office of Attorney General on June 22, 1831, a result of the Petticoat affair, along with Secretary of State Martin Van Buren (resigned on May 23), Secretary of the Treasury Samuel D. Ingham (June 20), and Secretary of the Navy John Branch (May 12).

After leaving the Cabinet he resumed the practice of law until he was again elected, as a Whig, to the U.S. Senate and served from March 4, 1841, until May 1845. He resigned to accept a seat on the Georgia State Supreme Court, but the Whig party re-elected him again elected in 1845 to the Senate to fill the vacancy caused by his second resignation. He never took his seat on the court. He was then reelected in 1846 and served from November 13, 1845, until May 28, 1852, when he resigned for the third time.

Berrien's views on sectional issues hardened during his tenure in the Senate and he became aligned with the short-lived Southern Rights Party formed to oppose the Compromise of 1850 and the Wilmot Proviso.

During the 1820s, Berrien was a member of the prestigious society, Columbian Institute for the Promotion of Arts and Sciences, which counted among its members presidents Andrew Jackson and John Quincy Adams and many prominent men of the day, including well-known representatives of the military, government service, medical and other professions.

He served as the chairman of the U.S. Senate Committee on the Judiciary in the 20th, 26th and 27th Congresses. He was president of the American Party convention at Milledgeville in 1855.

Berrien was a slaveholder, and owned 90 according to the 1830 U.S. census. In 1840, he owned eight slaves at his house in Savannah, Georgia, and an additional 140 slaves in surrounding Chatham County. In 1850, he owned 143 slaves.

== Death and legacy ==
Berrien died at his home, now known as the John Berrien House (named for his father), in Savannah on January 1, 1856. He is interred in Laurel Grove Cemetery. Berrien County, Georgia, and Berrien County, Michigan (one of Michigan's Cabinet Counties, organized during his term as attorney general), are named after him.

Berrien was one of the Georgia Historical Society's founders in 1839 and served as the organization's first president. The Georgia Historical Society holds a substantial collection of Berrien papers (including important material relating to the Petticoat affair). The Society also annually presents the John Macpherson Berrien Award, a lifetime achievement award recognizing outstanding contributions to Georgia history.

== Biography ==
- United States Congress. "John Macpherson Berrien (id: B000413)". Biographical Directory of the United States Congress.

U.S. Senate
| Preceded by John Elliott | U.S. Senator (Class 3) from Georgia; 1825–1829; Served alongside: Thomas W. Cobb, Oliver H. Prince, George Troup | Succeeded by John Forsyth |
| Preceded by Martin Van Buren | Chair of the Senate Judiciary Committee; 1828–1829 | Succeeded by John Rowan |
| Preceded by Wilson Lumpkin | U.S. Senator (Class 2) from Georgia; 1841–1845; Served alongside: Alfred Cuthbert, Walter T. Colquitt | Succeeded by Himself |
| Preceded by Garret D. Wall | Chair of the Senate Judiciary Committee; 1841–1845 | Succeeded by Chester Ashley |
| Preceded by Himself | U.S. Senator (Class 2) from Georgia; 1845–1852; Served alongside: Walter T. Colquitt, Herschel Johnson, William Dawson | Succeeded by Robert M. Charlton |
Legal offices
| Preceded by William Wirt | United States Attorney General; 1829–1831 | Succeeded by Roger B. Taney |
