= Rocky Hill Historic District =

Historic district in New Jersey, United States

- U.S. National Register of Historic Places
- U.S. Historic district
- New Jersey Register of Historic Places
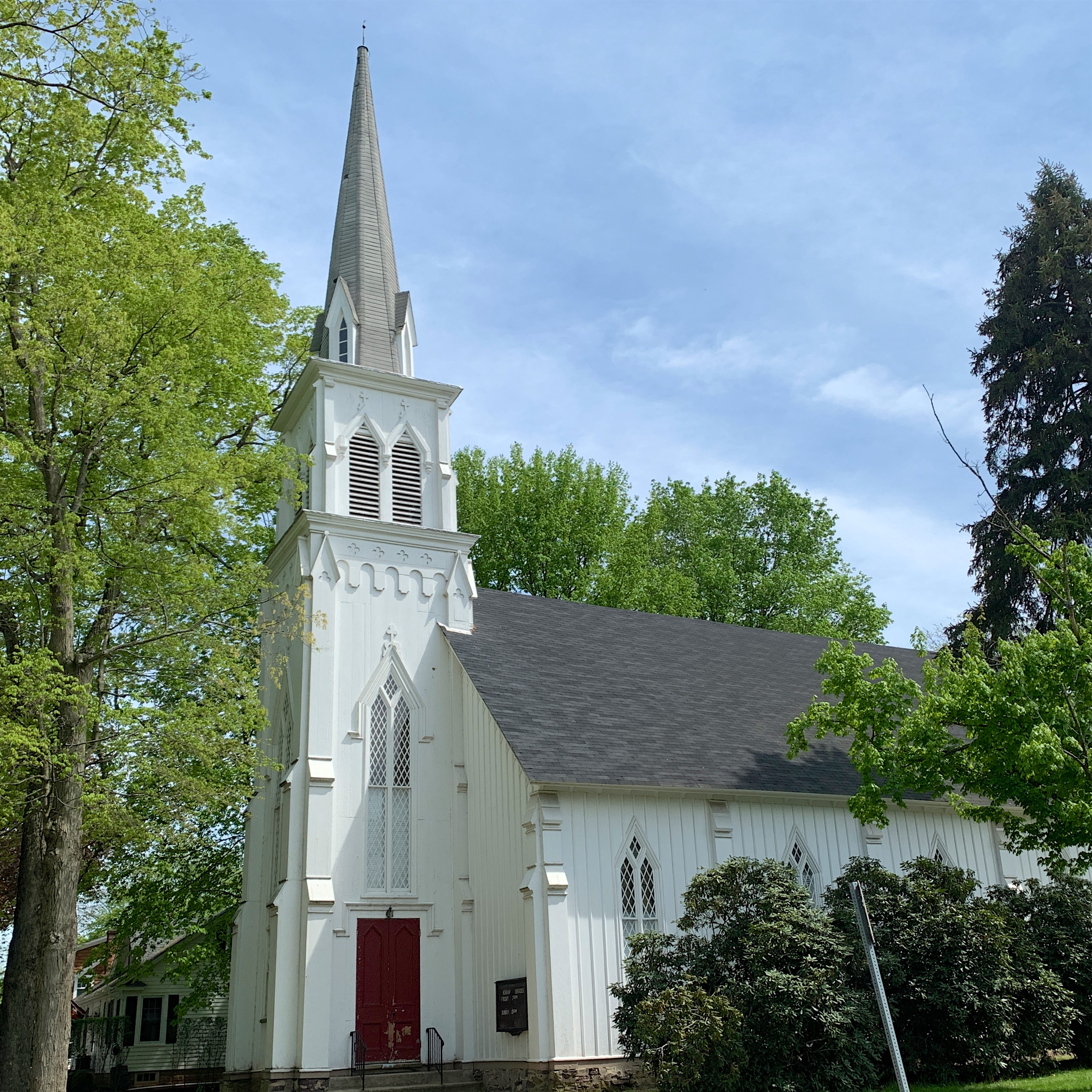
- Dutch Reformed Church, built 1856 in Carpenter Gothic style

- Location within Somerset County, New Jersey Location within New Jersey Location within the United States
- Location: Washington Street; Montgomery, Crescent, and Princeton Avenues; Rocky Hill, New Jersey
- Coordinates: 40°24′01″N 74°38′15″W
- Area: 176 acres (71 ha)
- Built: 18th and 19th centuries
- Architectural style: Vernacular, Colonial Revival, Queen Anne, Carpenter Gothic
- NRHP reference No.: 82003304
- NJRHP No.: 2580

Significant dates
- Added to NRHP: July 8, 1982
- Designated NJRHP: January 14, 1982

The Rocky Hill Historic District is a 176-acre (71 ha) historic district encompassing the historic core of the borough of Rocky Hill in Somerset County, New Jersey. The village is approximately one square mile and traces its beginnings to the 18th century, when George Washington stayed at Rockingham, and its major growth period to the second quarter of the 19th century. Located along Washington Street and Montgomery, Princeton, and Crescent Avenues, the district encompasses 145 buildings, only 12 of which are non-contributing, and has sustained its historic character without the intrusion of modern structures or parking lots. The most notable landmark in the village is Dutch Reformed Church, built in 1856 in the Carpenter Gothic style. The district was added to the National Register of Historic Places on July 8, 1982, for its significance in archeology, architecture and commerce.

== Gallery ==
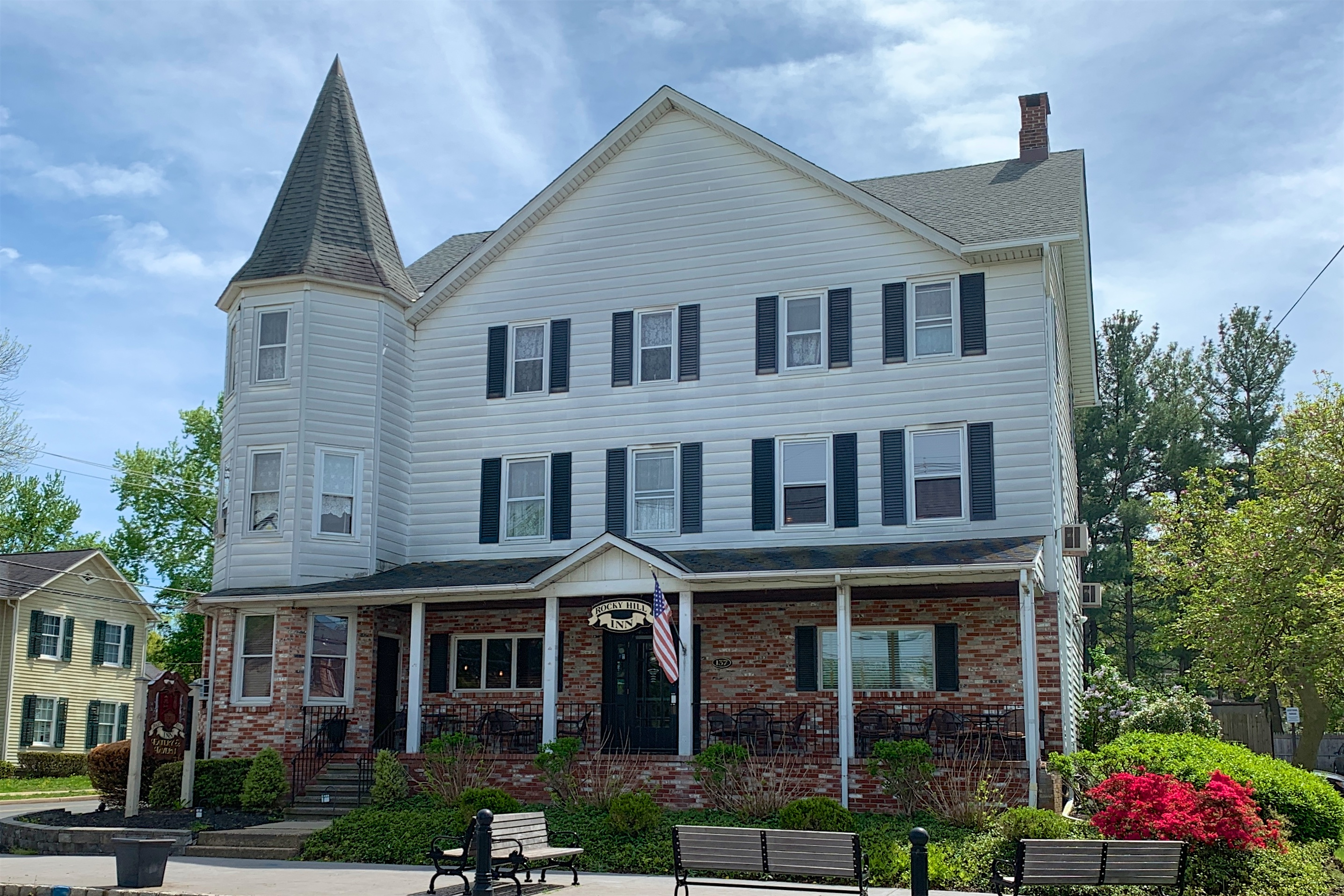
The Rocky Hill Inn, built c. 1825–1830

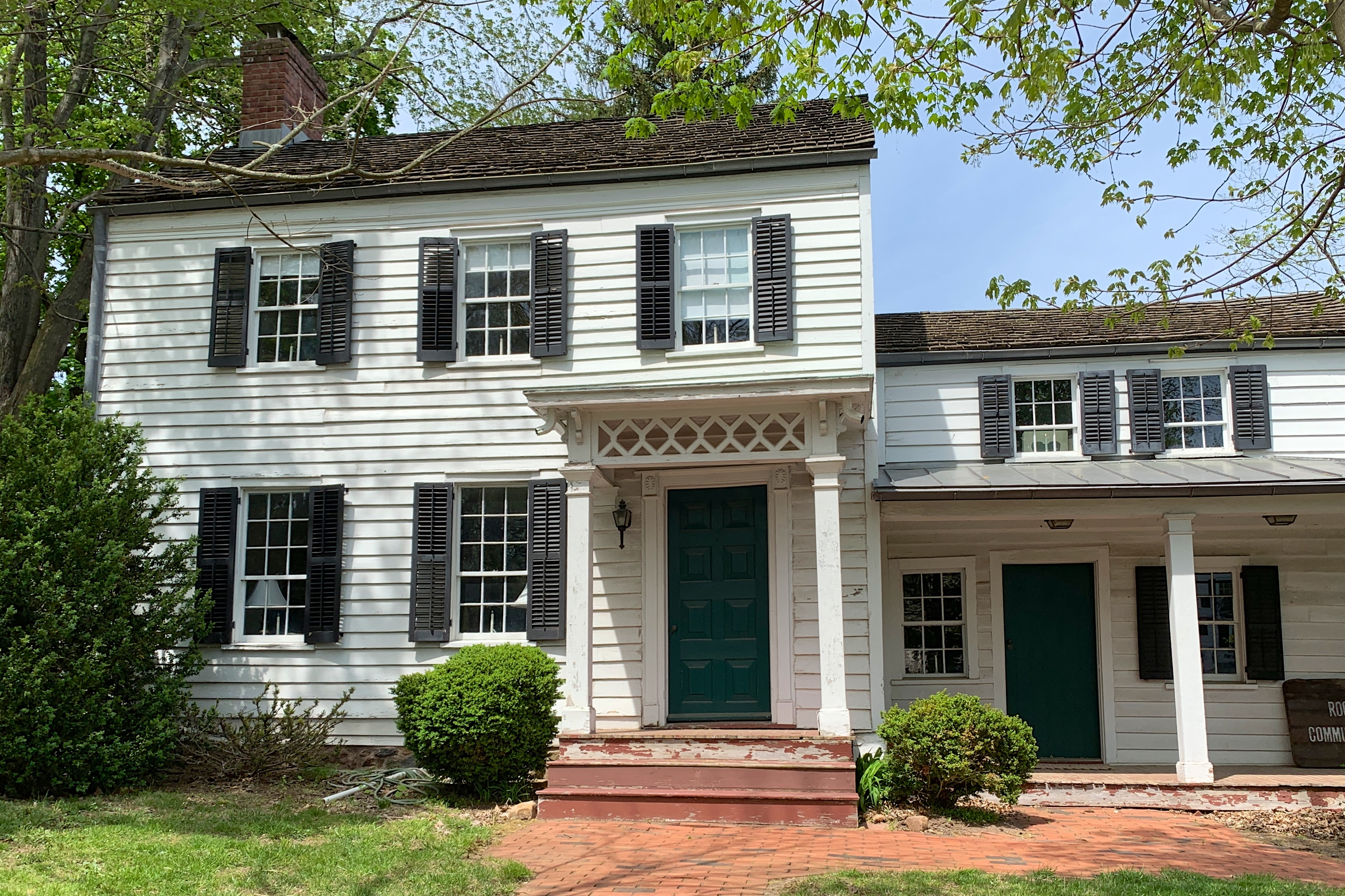
Rocky Hill Community Center, built c. 1840

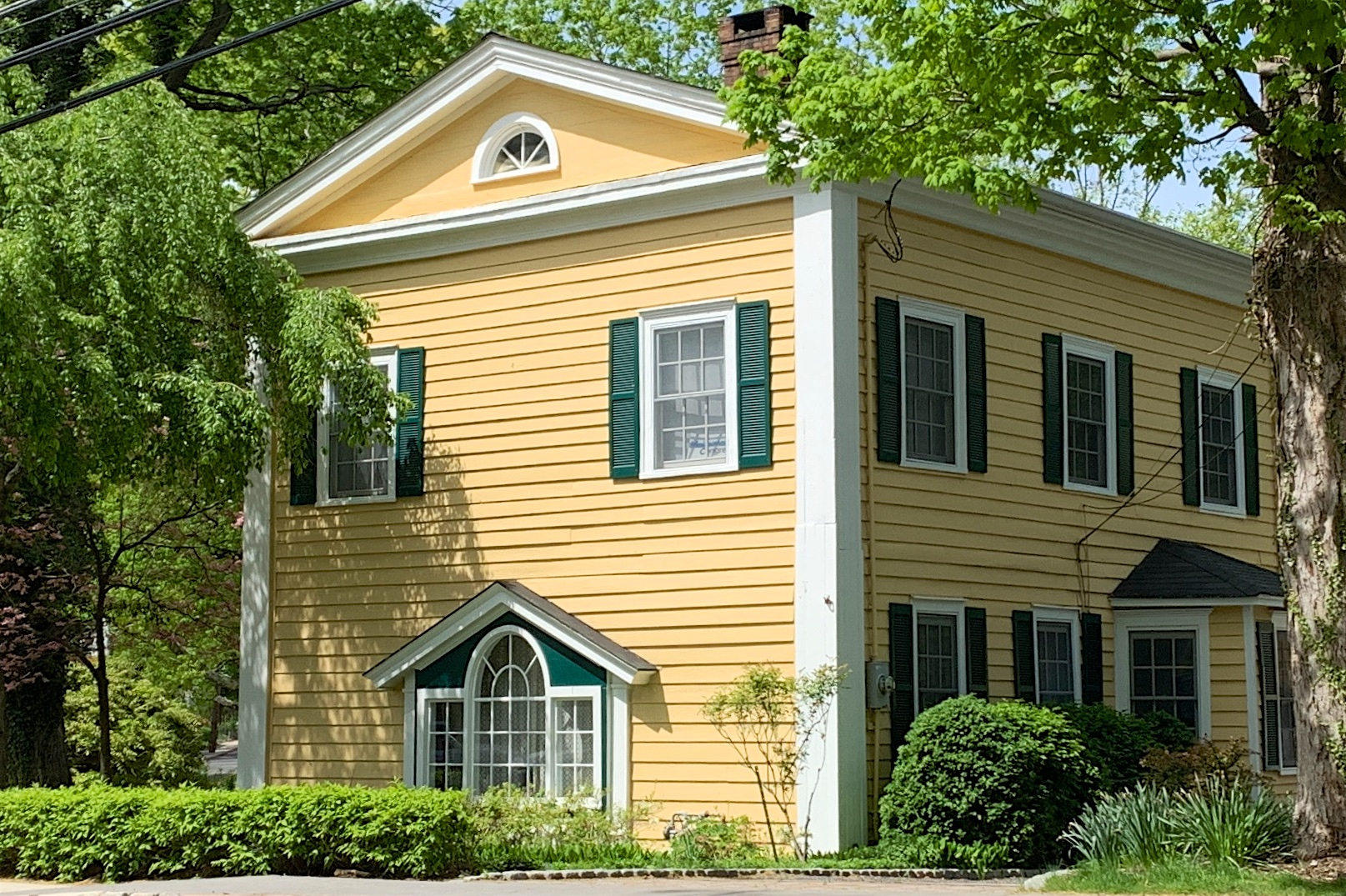
Former schoolhouse, built 1847–48

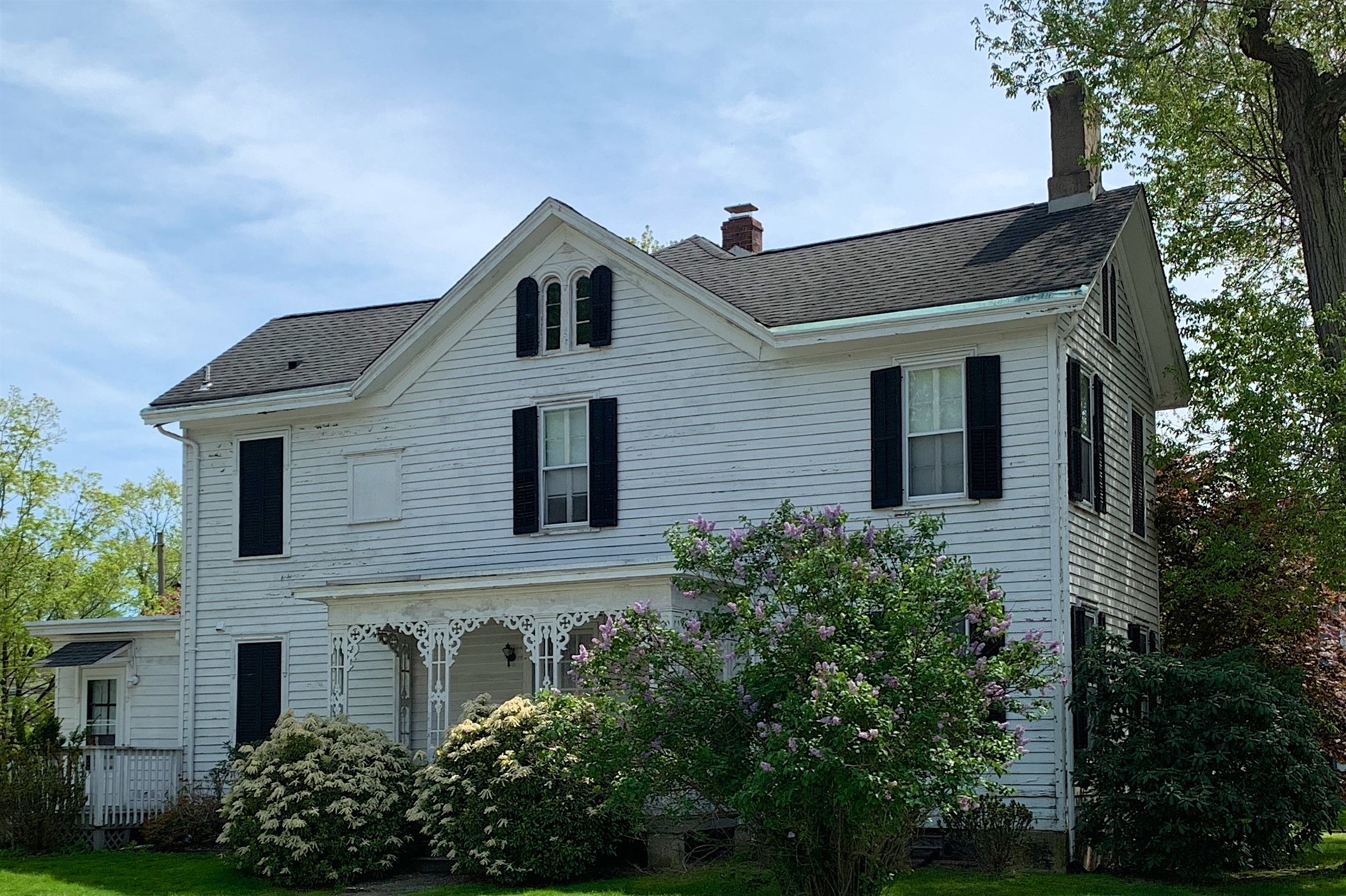
Parsonage for the Dutch Reformed Church, built 1858

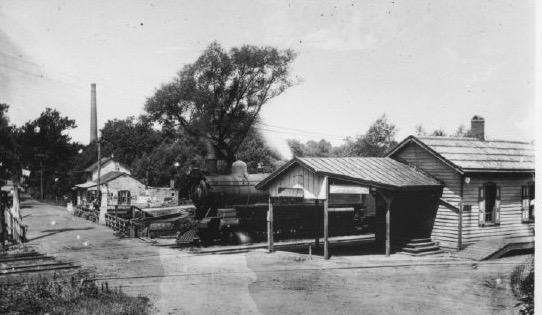
The no longer extant Pennsylvania Railroad depot in Rocky Hill, with the Delaware and Raritan Canal and the smokestack of the Power Station in the background

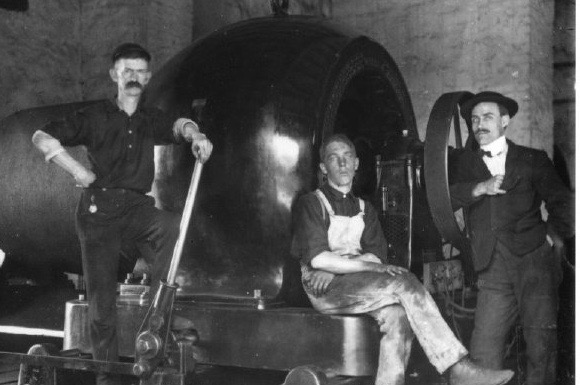
Workmen at the Atlantic Terra Cotta Company works, a major producer of architectural terracotta

== See also ==
- National Register of Historic Places listings in Somerset County, New Jersey
