= Somerset Spectator =

The Somerset Spectator is a regional newspaper in Somerset County, New Jersey that was established on September 11, 1969, by Marsha Senz, Roslyn Westheimer and Judith Quintman as the weekly newspaper that gives "a hoot about Franklin." In the 1990s, the paper became known as "The newspaper for southern Somerset County." The paper's mascot through 2002 was an owl designed by a local artist in 1969.

== History ==
The Spectator had its known office of publication in Franklin from its inception to 2003, when it moved to Hillsborough. In 2001, it became known as "The Spectator", while colloquially continuing to be known as the Somerset Spectator. In 2010, the newspaper moved its main offices to New Brunswick, in neighboring Middlesex County, while maintaining a bureau in Somerset County.

Over the years, it has served as official newspaper for Franklin, 1971–2000; Montgomery Township, 2001–present; Millstone Borough, 1997–99 and 2001–03; Borough of Rocky Hill, 1997–present, all in Somerset County.

Coverage was broadened to include Middlesex County towns adjacent to Somerset County with the move in 2010. The newspaper has included coverage of New Brunswick and North Brunswick from the 1980s onward.
