= John Berrien (major) =

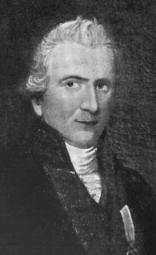
- Berrien around 1778
- Born: c. 1759; Rocky Hill, New Jersey
- Died: November 6, 1815 (aged 55 or 56); Savannah, Georgia, U.S.
- Resting place: Colonial Park Cemetery, Savannah, Georgia, U.S.
- Spouse(s): Margaret Macpherson (1780–1785; her death); Williamina Sarah Moore (1790–1815; his death)

John Berrien (c. 1759 – November 6, 1815) was a brigade major during the American Revolutionary War.

== Early life and career ==
Berrien was born in about 1759 in Rocky Hill, New Jersey, to John Berrien and Lady Margaret Eaton (niece of Lord John Eaton of England). His father, who was justice of the New Jersey Supreme Court, died when John Jr. was thirteen. He moved to the Province of Georgia shortly thereafter, and stayed with his cousins, the LeContes.

He joined the Continental Army at age 16, serving initially as one of General George Washington's aides. He was then commissioned as a second lieutenant in the Georgia Continental Brigade, under General Robert Ware, and also served in Spanish Florida. He served under General Lachlan McIntosh in 1777. He distinguished himself in the Battle of Monmouth, while on Washington's staff, that he was complimented by the Second Continental Congress and made a brigade major at the age of eighteen.

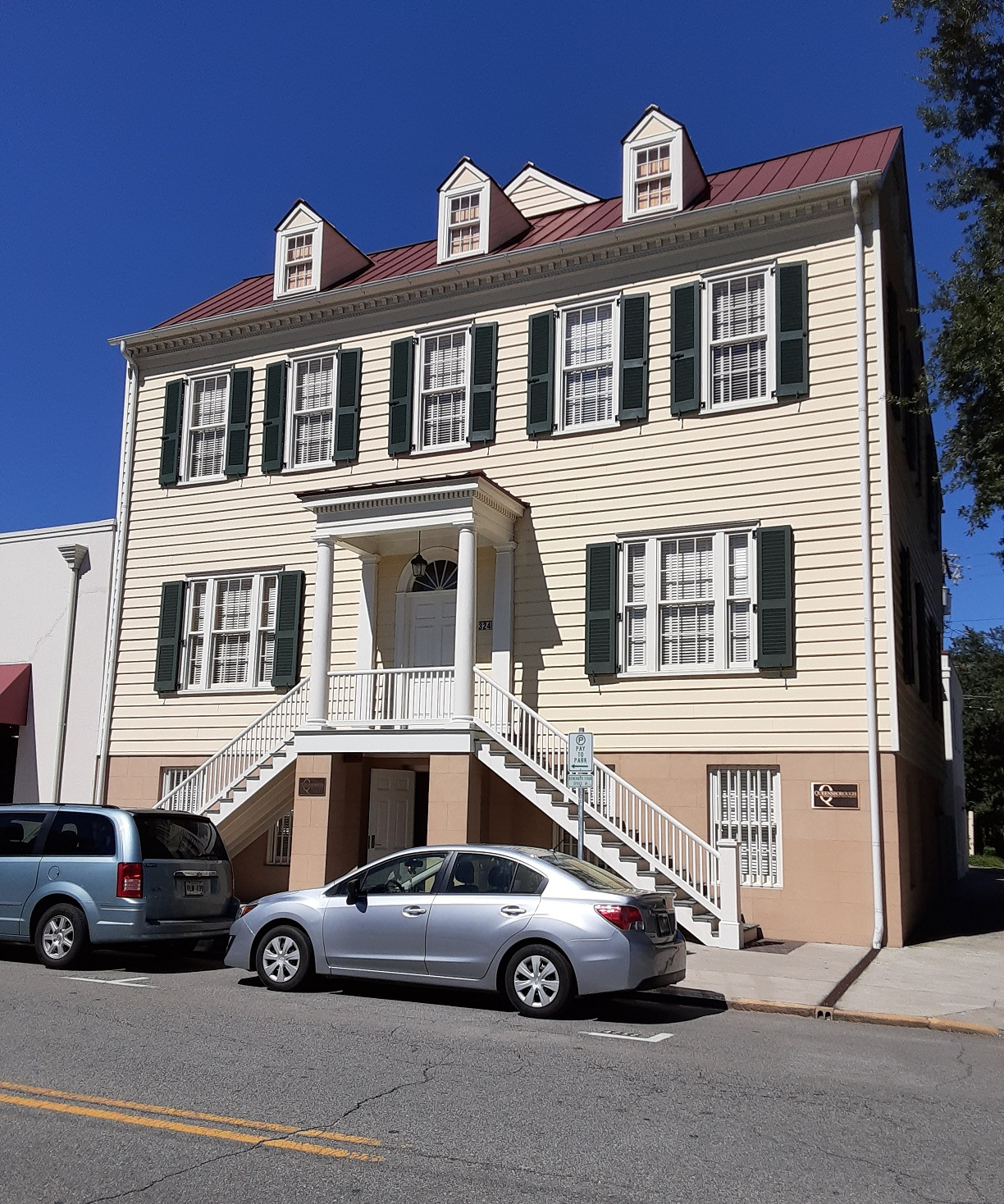
John Berrien House, Savannah, Georgia

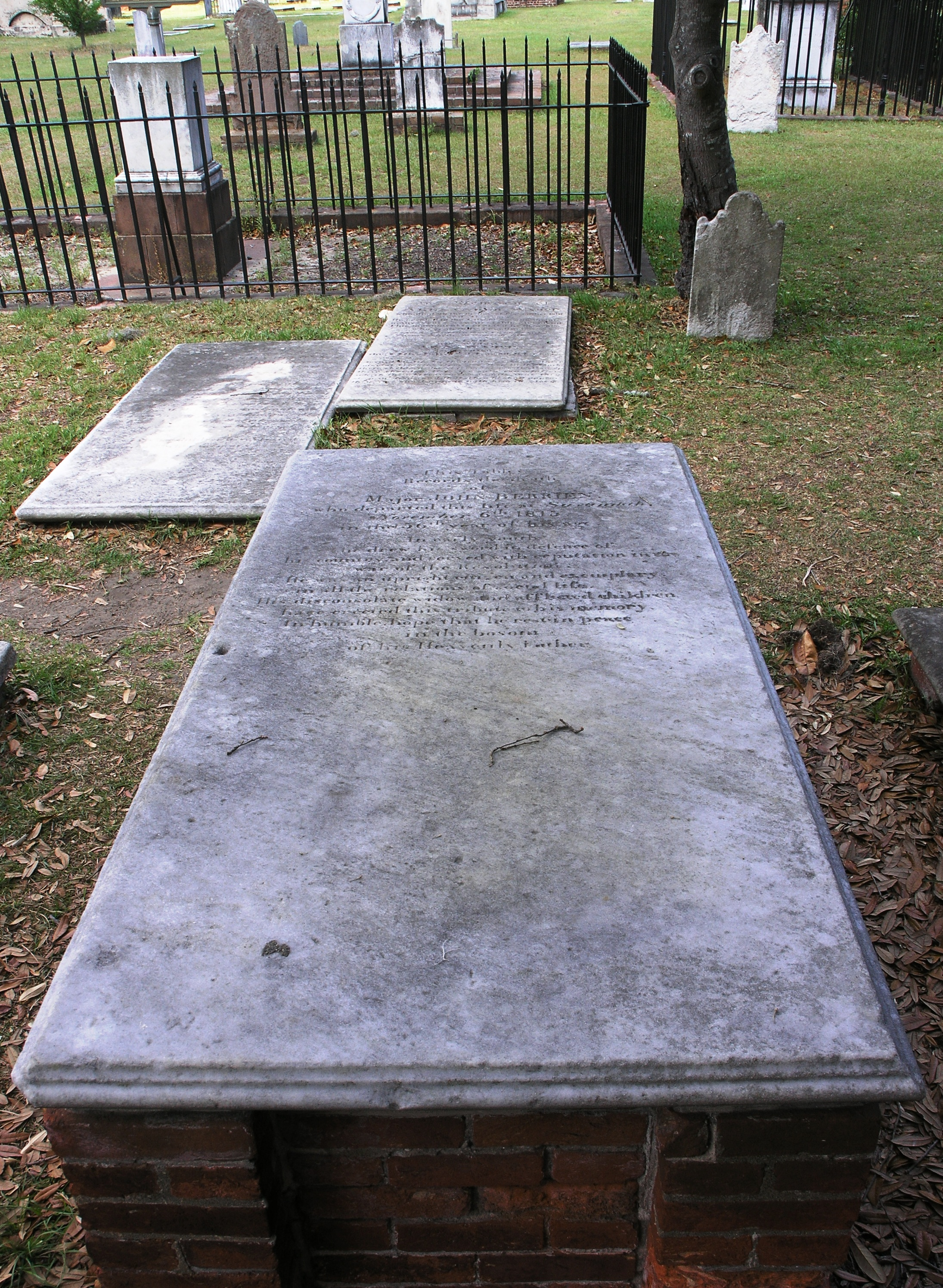
Berrien's grave tablet in Colonial Park Cemetery, Savannah, Georgia

After the war, Berrien undertook privateering expeditions, during which he met Captain John Macpherson. Berrien married Macpherson's daughter, Margaret, in 1780. They had one child, John Macpherson Berrien, in 1781.

On November 21, 1783, General George Washington wrote and delivered his farewell address at Rockingham, the former home of Berrien's father, which Berrien Jr. had inherited.

Shortly thereafter, Berrien returned to Georgia with his family, but Margaret died in McIntosh County in 1785.

Berrien served as justice of the peace and captain of the militia while in Liberty County, Georgia.

The Georgia legislature appointed him Collector of Customs at the Port of Savannah in 1786.

In 1790, Berrien married a second time, to Williamina Sarah Moore (1771–1838), with whom he had seven more children: Richard McAllister (1795), Ruth Lowndes (1798), Julia Maria (1801), Thomas, Sarah, Eliza and James Wemyss Moore (1807). Thomas Berrien fought in the Creek War. J. W. M. Moore was expelled from the United States Military Academy for his participation in the Christmas 1826 cadet mutiny, and in later life became a "great landowner" and commission merchant in Rome, George.

In 1791, he built a house at today's 322–324 East Broughton Street in Savannah, Georgia. He served again as Collector of Customs at the port, and was also an alderman between 1791 and 1795.

Berrien was a member of Savannah's Christ Church. He was also an original member of the Society of Cincinnati, serving as president of the Georgia Society. He was a member of Solomon's Lodge, the masonic lodge established by the colony of Georgia founder General James Oglethorpe.

Berrien sold his Savannah home in 1797 after becoming the state treasurer in the new state capital of Louisville, Georgia.

=== Death ===
Berrien died on November 6, 1815, aged 55 or 56. He is interred in Savannah's Colonial Park Cemetery. His second wife survived him by 23 years.
