= Justice Court Building =

- U.S. National Register of Historic Places
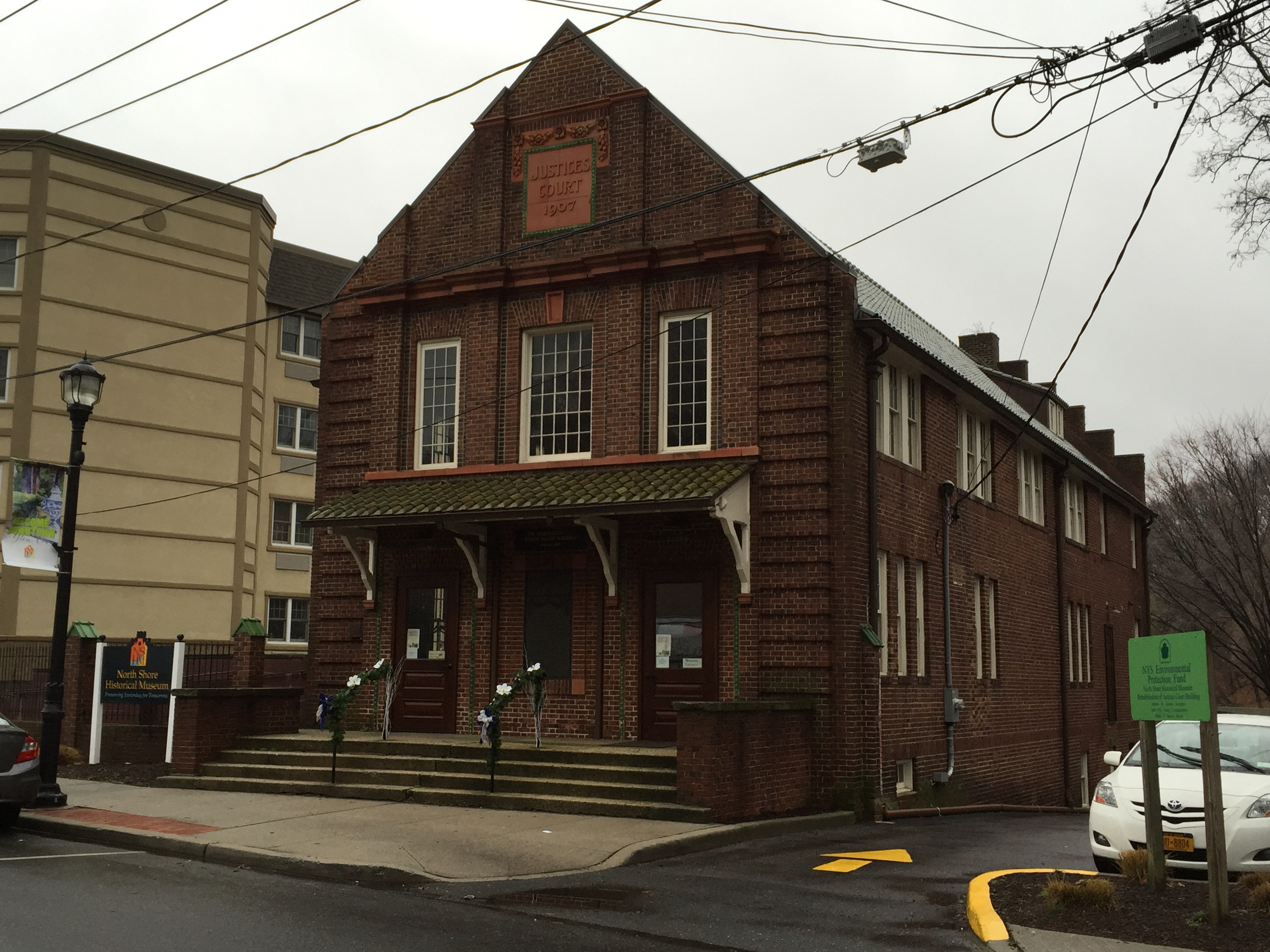

- Location within New York Location within the United States
- Location: Jct. of Town Path Ext. and Glen Cove Hwy., Glen Cove, New York
- Coordinates: 40°51′44″N 73°37′34″W
- Area: 1.3 acres (0.53 ha)
- Built: 1907
- Architect: Stephen F. Voorhees
- Architectural style: Dutch Colonial Revival
- NRHP reference No.: 90000691
- Added to NRHP: April 26, 1990

The Justice Court Building is a historic court and municipal building located in Glen Cove in Nassau County, New York. Built for the city between 1907 and 1909, it was designed by the architect Stephen F. Voorhees (1878–1965) of Eidlitz & McKenzie. The 3-story, rectangular red brick building has a steeply pitched roof covered with green clay tile. A 1 1/2-story rear addition was built in 1923, used for some time as a jail. It is decorated with ceramic-glazed moldings and molded terra cotta decoration and exhibits features of the Dutch Colonial Revival or Collegiate Gothic style. It features a square bell tower. The former rectory contains the museum and is a 2-story rectangular building in the Tudor Revival style.

The building on Glen Street was used for the court, city hall and later as police headquarters. In the early decades, the Women's Exchange was located just to the west of the building; the group raised money to provide social services.

It was listed on the National Register of Historic Places in 1990. The North Shore Historical Museum acquired the building, successfully restored it, and readapted it for use as a museum.
