= Stephen F. Voorhees =

American architect (1878–1965)

- Born: February 15, 1878; Rocky Hill, New Jersey, U.S.
- Died: January 23, 1965 (aged 86); New York City, New York, U.S.
- Occupation: Architect

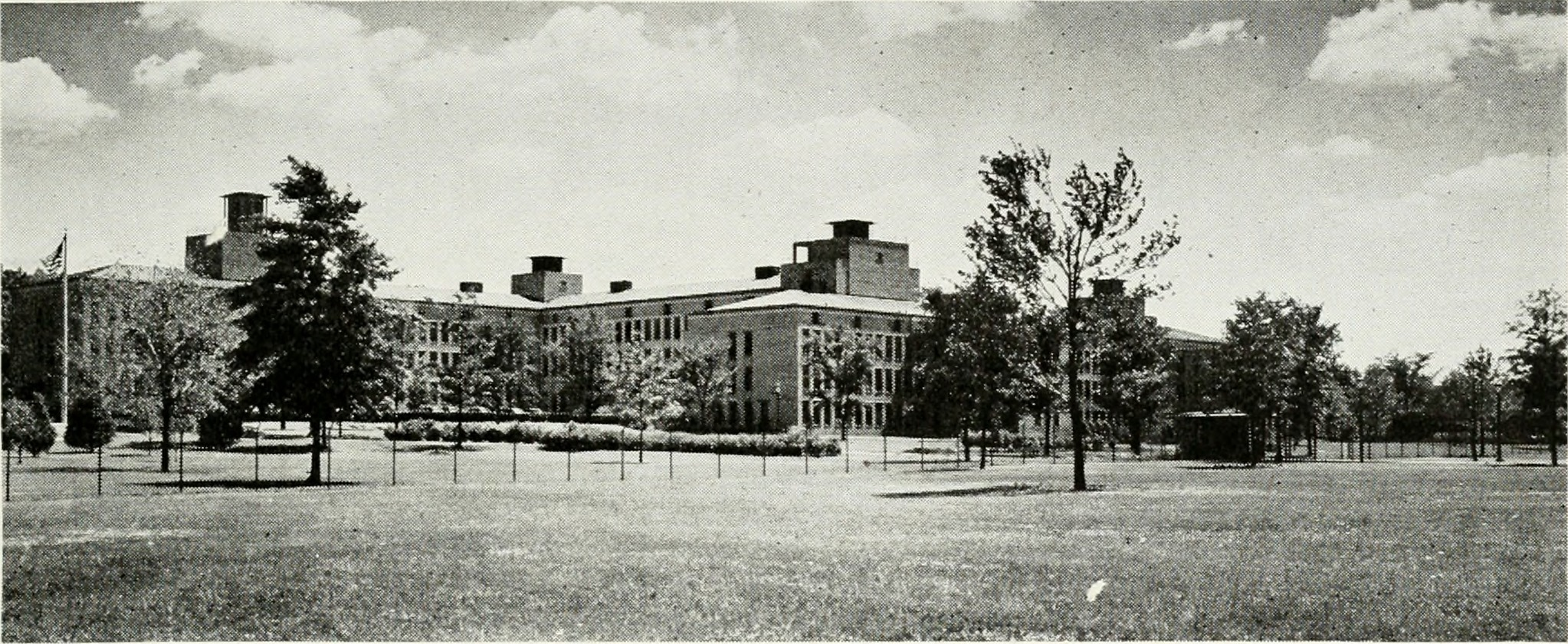
The headquarters of Bell Labs in Murray Hill, New Jersey, designed by Voorhees, Walker, Foley & Smith and completed in 1941.

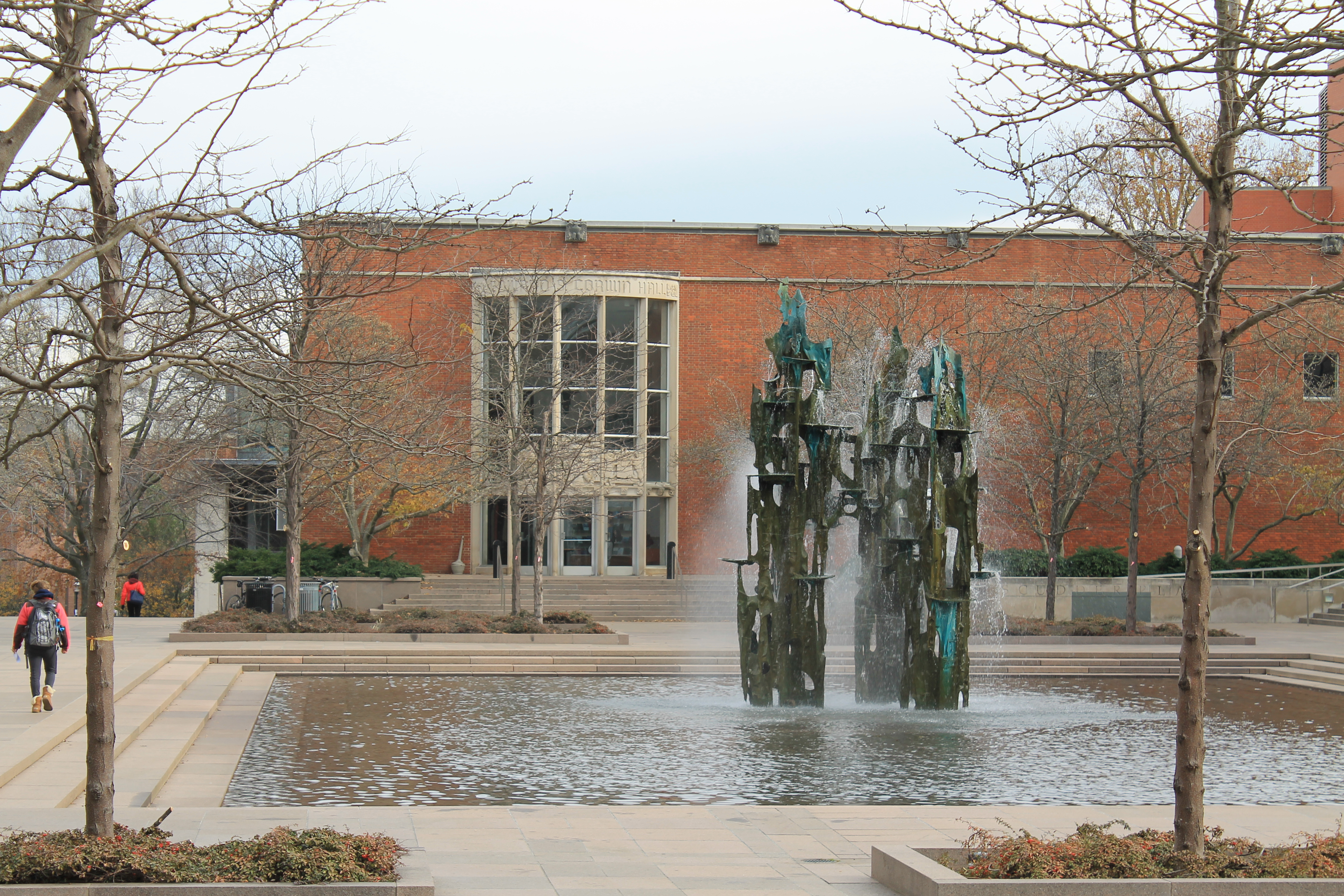
Corwin Hall of Princeton University, completed in 1952.

Stephen Francis Voorhees FAIA (February 15, 1878 – January 23, 1965) was an American architect in practice in New York City from 1910 until 1959. From 1935 to 1937 he was president of the American Institute of Architects.

== Life and career ==
Voorhees was born February 15, 1878, in Rocky Hill, New Jersey. He was educated in the Trenton public schools and at Princeton University, graduating in 1900 with a degree in civil engineering. In 1902 he joined the firm of Eidlitz & McKenzie, architects and engineers, in New York City. As a designer, he was responsible for the Justice Court Building in Glen Gove, completed in 1909. In 1910 Eidlitz retired and Voorhees and another employee, Paul Gmelin, joined McKenzie in partnership to form the firm of McKenzie, Voorhees & Gmelin. When McKenzie died in 1926, Ralph Thomas Walker joined the partnership and the firm became Voorhees, Gmelin & Walker. The practice was later reorganized several times, and was renamed Voorhees, Walker, Foley & Smith in 1939 and Voorhees, Walker, Smith & Smith in 1955. In 1959 Voorhees retired from practice, and the firm was renamed Voorhees, Walker, Smith, Smith & Haines. Though no longer an active member of the firm, Voorhees was retained as a consultant. His last important work was the Engineering Quadrange at Princeton, completed in 1962. The office is still in business (2022) as HLW International.

Major works designed by Voorhees included buildings for the New York Telephone Company in New York City, Bell Labs in Murray Hill, New Jersey, the Prudential Insurance Company in Newark, New Jersey, and buildings for Harvard University, the Massachusetts Institute of Technology and Princeton University.

Voorhees joined the American Institute of Architects in 1919, and was elected a Fellow in 1926. In 1935 he was elected president, and was reelected in 1936. Voorhees remained active in the AIA until 1959, when his membership was suspended for two years due to ethics allegations. In 1960 this was reversed, but Voorhees did not return.

Voorhees was a trustee of Princeton University, the Metropolitan Museum of Art and the Stevens Institute of Technology. He was awarded honorary Doctor of Engineering degrees from Princeton in 1937 and Rensselaer Polytechnic Institute in 1939, and a Doctor of Fine Arts from New York University in 1939.

== Personal life and death ==
Voorhees was married in 1907 to Mabel Aleda Buys. They had no children. Voorhees died January 23, 1965.

Voorhees had a life-long interest in photography and filmmaking, and in 1926 was a founder of the Amateur Cinema League.
