= John Berrien House =

Historic house in Savannah, Georgia

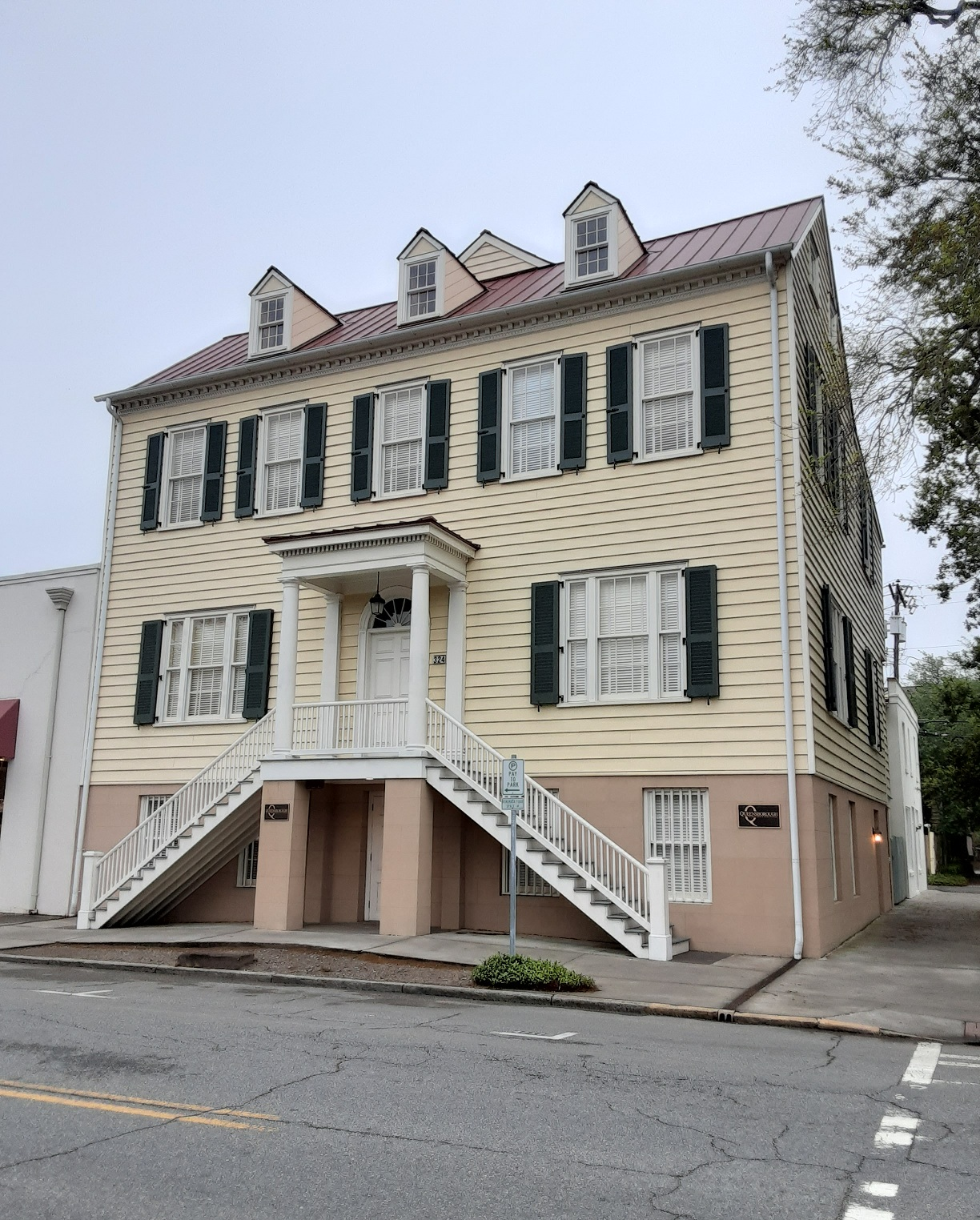
- The building in 2022
- Interactive map of the John Berrien House area

General information
- Location: Savannah, Georgia, U.S., 322–324 East Broughton Street
- Coordinates: 32.0780080°N 81.087769°W
- Completed: circa 1794 (232 years ago)

Technical details
- Floor count: 3

The John Berrien House is a historic home in Savannah, Georgia, United States. It is located at 322–324 East Broughton Street, at its intersection with Habersham Street, and was built around 1794. One of the oldest extant buildings in Savannah, it is now part of the Savannah Historic District, and was built for major John Berrien, an army officer during the American Revolutionary War. Berrien lived in the house until 1797, when he moved to Louisville, Georgia. He sold the property to William Stephens, of Beaulieu Plantation. Stephens died in the home in 1882, at which point John Macpherson Berrien brought it back into the Berrien family. He lived there periodically until his death, also in the home, in 1856. Berrien's son-in-law Francis Bartow inherited the home, and he sold it to William Lake three years later.

Lake split the property into two townhouses in 1871, with his brother-in-law, pharmacist Dr. Benjamin Hardee, occupying the eastern side. He had his offices on the first floor and lived in the upper storey.

The gardens that original owner Berrien had laid out in the western lot of the two lots he purchased were replaced by a row of townhouses.

The property was converted into a tenement in 1916. The building was raised over three feet the following year, with the original ground floor demolished and replaced with modern commercial space. The interior of the upper floors were divided into smaller rooms, thus original details were lost or covered up.

The building was remodeled between 2012 and 2016. The stucco that had been added to its exterior in the 20th-century changes was removed, revealing the original clapboard siding, which was made of beaded cypress. Its removal also revealed the home's original cornice. The building was lowered, onto an 18th-century-style ground floor construction.

== See also ==
- Buildings in Savannah Historic District
