= John Berrien =

American judge (1711–1772)

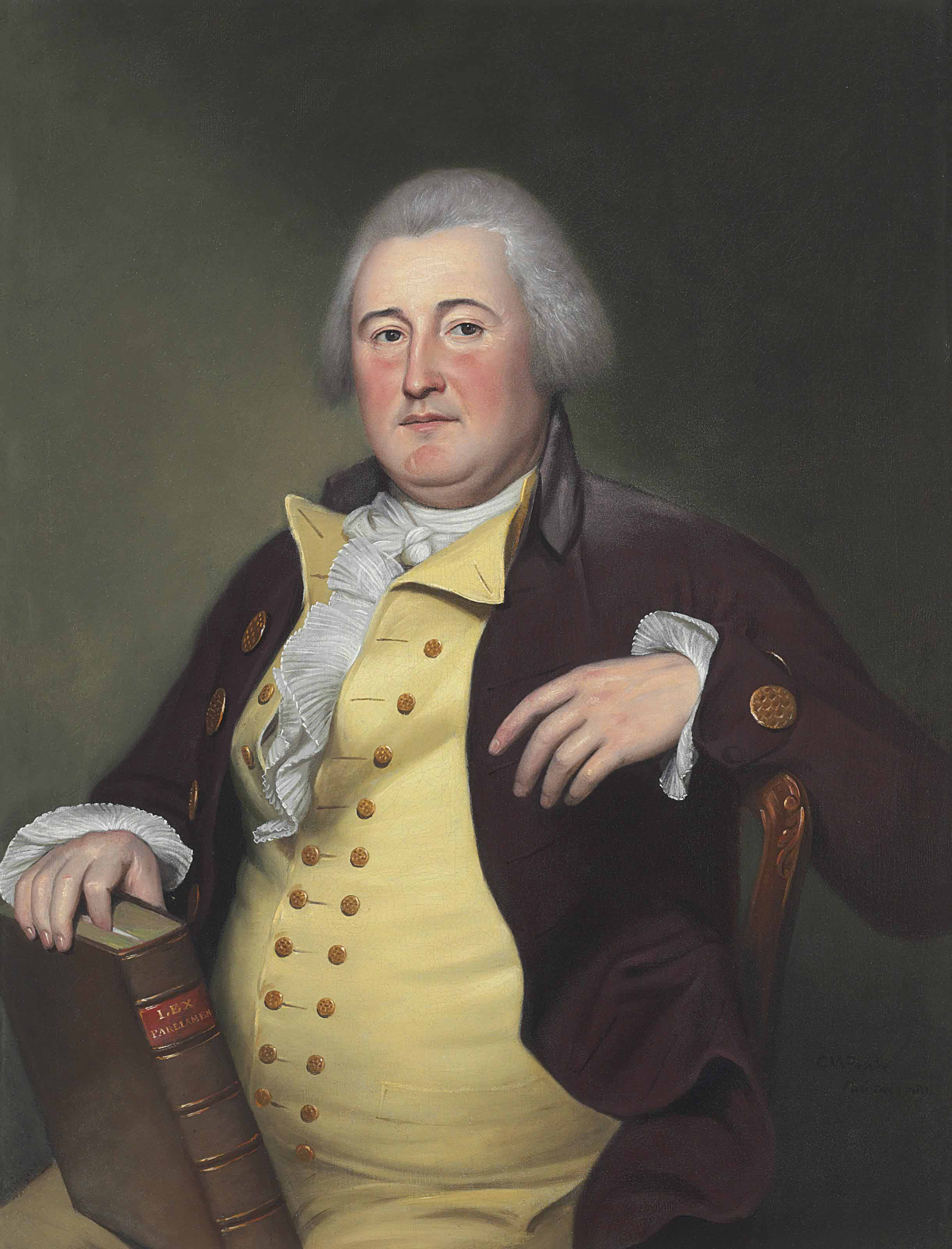
- Portrait of Berrien by Charles Willson Peale
- Born: November 19, 1711; Newtown, New York
- Died: April 22, 1772 (aged 60); Rocky Hill, New Jersey
- Burial place: Princeton Cemetery
- Occupation: Judge

John Berrien (November 19, 1711 – April 22, 1772) was a farmer and merchant from Rocky Hill, New Jersey. He was appointed a justice of the New Jersey Supreme Court in 1764 and was a trustee of the College of New Jersey, now Princeton University, for eleven years.

== Biography ==
Berrien was born on November 19, 1711, at Newtown on Long Island, now known as Elmhurst, Queens. He was the grandson of Cornelius Jansen Berrien. His parents were Peter Berrien and Elizabeth Woodhull Edsall.

After his first wife died, and they had no children. In 1759 he married again, to Lady Margaret Eaton. He and Margaret had a total of six children. Their son John Berrien (1759–1815) became a brigade major during the American Revolutionary War.

Although Berrien was a prosperous and prominent individual, on April 21, 1772, he drowned himself by jumping into the Millstone River. He was believed to have committed suicide, because of "lunacy", as one account said at the time. His will divided his property equally among his wife and six children. He is buried in Princeton Cemetery.

His house Rockingham, near Rocky Hill, New Jersey was used by General George Washington as his last headquarters during the war. Congress leased it for Washington for three months while the legislators were in residence in Princeton. Washington wrote his final address to the army in 1783 while staying there.
