= Rocky Hill, New Jersey =

Borough in Somerset County, New Jersey, US

- Borough
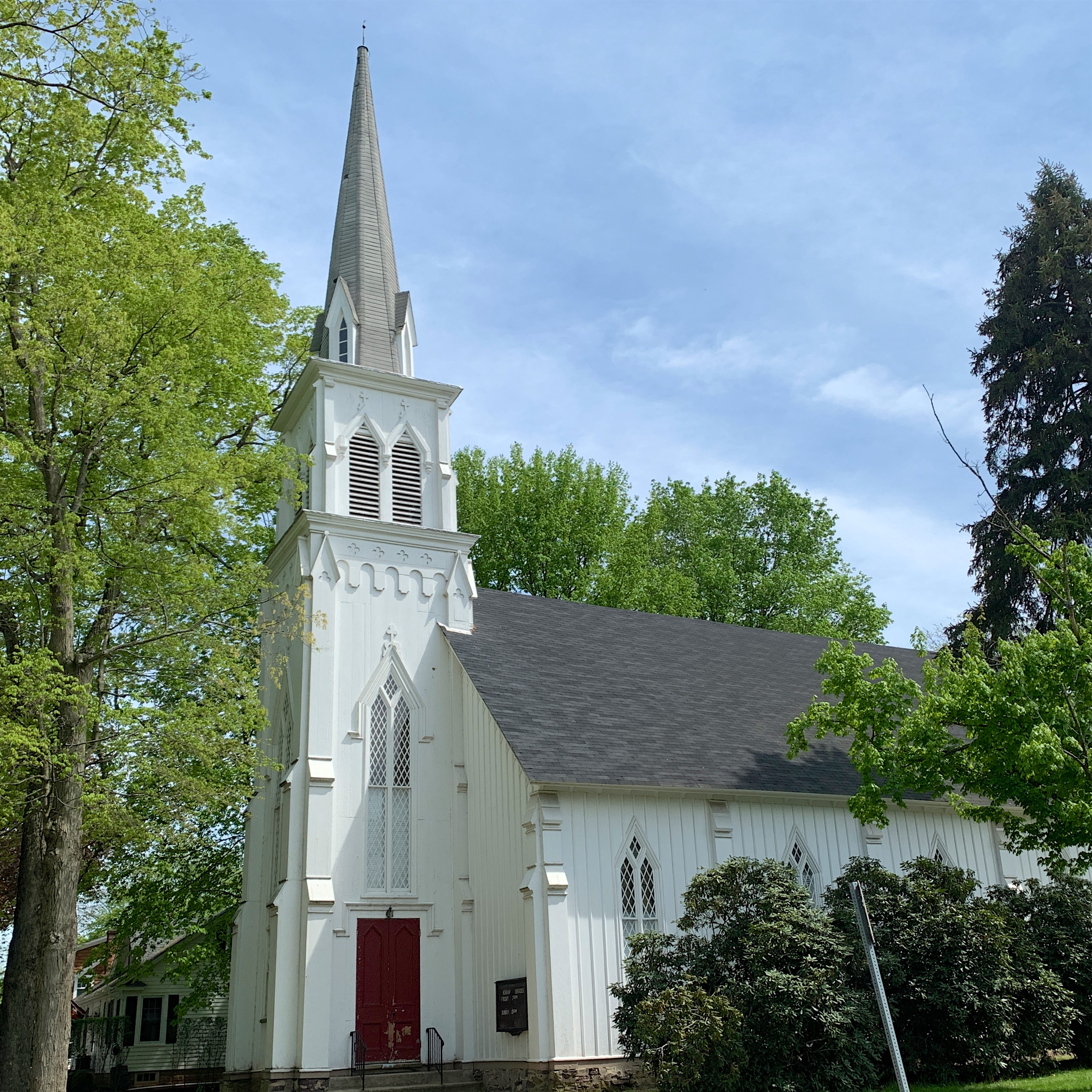
- Dutch Reformed Church, built 1856, at the heart of the Rocky Hill Historic District

- Seal

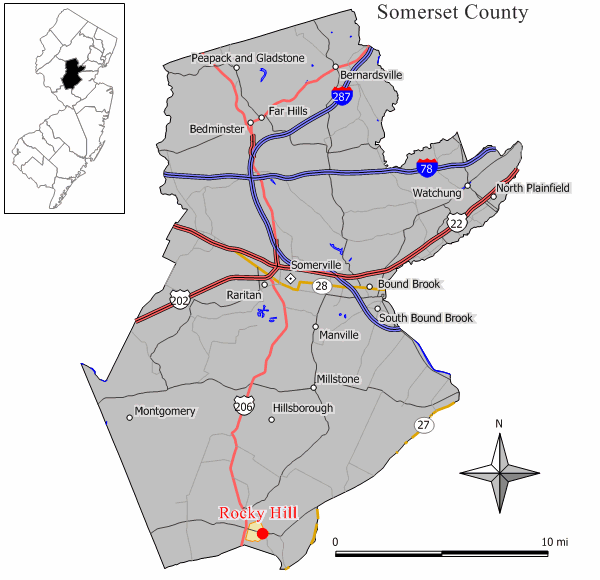
- Location of Rocky Hill in Somerset County highlighted in yellow (right). Inset map: Location of Somerset County in New Jersey highlighted in black (left).

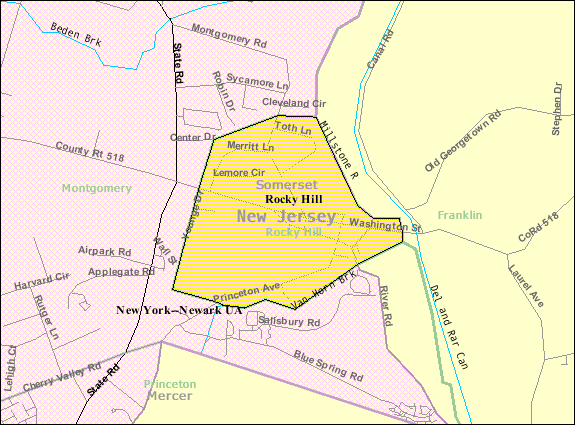
- Census Bureau map of Rocky Hill, New Jersey

- Location in Somerset County Location in New Jersey Location in the United States
- Coordinates: 40.400347°N 74.638922°W
- Country: United States
- State: New Jersey
- County: Somerset
- Incorporated: December 18, 1889

Government
  - Type: Borough
  - Body: Borough Council
  - Mayor: Robert Uhrik (D, term ends December 31, 2026)
  - Municipal clerk: Vacant

Area
  - Total: 0.61 sq mi (1.59 km^{2})
  - Land: 0.61 sq mi (1.58 km^{2})
  - Water: 0.0039 sq mi (0.01 km^{2}) 0.49%
  - Rank: 539th of 565 in state 21st of 21 in county
- Elevation: 108 ft (33 m)

Population (2020)
  - Total: 743
  - Estimate (2023): 740
  - Rank: 545th of 565 in state 20th of 21 in county
  - Density: 1,216.4/sq mi (469.7/km^{2})
  - Rank: 358th of 565 in state 10th of 21 in county
- Time zone: UTC−05:00 (Eastern (EST))
  - Summer (DST): UTC−04:00 (Eastern (EDT))
- ZIP Code: 08553
- Area code: 609 Exchanges: 252, 279, 430, 921, 924
- FIPS code: 3403564320
- GNIS feature ID: 0885376
- Website: www.rockyhill-nj.gov

Rocky Hill is a borough in Somerset County, in the U.S. state of New Jersey. Named for the Rocky Hill Ridge, this historic village is nestled within the heart of the Raritan Valley region, located alongside the course of the Millstone River.

As of the 2020 United States census, the borough's population was 743, an increase of 61 (+8.9%) from the 2010 census count of 682, which in turn reflected an increase of 20 (+3.0%) from the 662 counted in the 2000 census.

== History ==
The earliest European settlement in the area began after John Harrison negotiated the purchase of land in 1701 from the Lenape Native Americans. Speaking an Algonquian language, they had occupied the area for centuries prior to the arrival of European settlers. Bands of Lenape lived along the coast from Connecticut through New York and New Jersey and south to Maryland and Delaware.

In 1783, during the American Revolutionary War, General George Washington camped at Rockingham, the house owned by the Berrien family. He passed through the area again in 1789 on his way to New York City for his inauguration as President of the United States. Before roads were improved, it was known as the Devil's Featherbed because it was difficult to travel the rocky terrain by horse and wagon.

Rocky Hill was incorporated as a borough by an act of the New Jersey Legislature on December 18, 1889, from portions of Montgomery Township. This was based on the results of a referendum held four days earlier.

== Geography ==
According to the United States Census Bureau, the borough had a total area of 0.61 square miles (1.59 km^{2}), including 0.61 square miles (1.58 km^{2}) of land and <0.01 square miles (0.01 km^{2}) of water (0.49%). A large portion of Rocky Hill is taken up by Van Horne Park.

The borough borders the Somerset County municipalities of Franklin Township and Montgomery Township.

== Ecology ==
According to the A. W. Kuchler U.S. potential natural vegetation types, Rocky Hill would have an Appalachian Oak (104) vegetation type with an Eastern Hardwood Forest (25) vegetation form.

== Demographics ==
Historical population
Census	Pop.	Note	%±
1900	354		—
1910	502		41.8%
1920	305		−39.2%
1930	512		67.9%
1940	404		−21.1%
1950	537		32.9%
1960	528		−1.7%
1970	917		73.7%
1980	717		−21.8%
1990	693		−3.3%
2000	662		−4.5%
2010	682		3.0%
2020	743		8.9%
2023 (est.)	740	▼	−0.4%
Population sources: 1900–1920; 1900–1910 1910–1930; 1940–2000 2000; 2010 2020

=== 2010 census ===
The 2010 United States census counted 682 people, 280 households, and 189 families in the borough. The population density was 1,101.4 per square mile (425.3/km^{2}). There were 292 housing units at an average density of 471.6 per square mile (182.1/km^{2}). The racial makeup was 91.64% (625) White, 1.47% (10) Black or African American, 0.00% (0) Native American, 2.35% (16) Asian, 0.00% (0) Pacific Islander, 1.47% (10) from other races, and 3.08% (21) from two or more races. Hispanic or Latino of any race were 4.84% (33) of the population.

Of the 280 households, 29.3% had children under the age of 18; 56.4% were married couples living together; 8.6% had a female householder with no husband present and 32.5% were non-families. Of all households, 26.4% were made up of individuals and 8.2% had someone living alone who was 65 years of age or older. The average household size was 2.40 and the average family size was 2.95.

23.2% of the population were under the age of 18, 4.7% from 18 to 24, 21.3% from 25 to 44, 32.4% from 45 to 64, and 18.5% who were 65 years of age or older. The median age was 45.9 years. For every 100 females, the population had 103.0 males. For every 100 females ages 18 and older there were 91.2 males.

The Census Bureau's 2006–2010 American Community Survey showed that (in 2010 inflation-adjusted dollars) median household income was $88,929 (with a margin of error of +/− $14,448) and the median family income was $102,917 (+/− $21,668). Males had a median income of $88,333 (+/− $16,491) versus $57,083 (+/− $7,607) for females. The per capita income for the borough was $47,582 (+/− $7,276). About none of families and 3.3% of the population were below the poverty line, including none of those under age 18 and none of those age 65 or over.

=== 2000 census ===
As of the 2000 United States census there were 662 people, 284 households, and 189 families residing in the borough. The population density was 982.0 inhabitants per square mile (379.2/km^{2}). There were 295 housing units at an average density of 437.6 per square mile (169.0/km^{2}). The racial makeup of the borough was 95.17% White, 1.36% African American, 0.45% Asian, 0.60% Pacific Islander, 0.91% from other races, and 1.51% from two or more races. Hispanic or Latino of any race were 3.93% of the population.

There were 284 households, out of which 24.3% had children under the age of 18 living with them, 60.9% were married couples living together, 4.9% had a female householder with no husband present, and 33.1% were non-families. 27.8% of all households were made up of individuals, and 12.7% had someone living alone who was 65 years of age or older. The average household size was 2.33 and the average family size was 2.82.

In the borough the population was spread out, with 20.2% under the age of 18, 3.3% from 18 to 24, 28.1% from 25 to 44, 31.1% from 45 to 64, and 17.2% who were 65 years of age or older. The median age was 44 years. For every 100 females, there were 98.2 males. For every 100 females age 18 and over, there were 95.6 males.

The median income for a household in the borough was $79,469, and the median income for a family was $100,314. Males had a median income of $54,375 versus $50,357 for females. The per capita income for the borough was $48,357. About 2.5% of families and 2.7% of the population were below the poverty line, including 1.8% of those under age 18 and 5.3% of those age 65 or over.

== Government ==
=== Local government ===
Rocky Hill is governed under the borough form of New Jersey municipal government, which is used in 218 municipalities (of the 564) statewide, making it the most common form of government in New Jersey. The governing body is comprised of the mayor and the borough council, with all positions elected at-large on a partisan basis as part of the November general election. The mayor is elected directly by the voters to a four-year term of office. The borough council includes six members elected to serve three-year terms on a staggered basis, with two seats coming up for election each year in a three-year cycle. The borough form of government used by Rocky Hill is a "weak mayor / strong council" government, in which council members act as the legislative body. The mayor presides at meetings and votes only in the event of a tie. The mayor can veto ordinances subject to an override by a two-thirds majority vote of the council. The mayor makes committee and liaison assignments for council members, and most appointments are made by the mayor with the advice and consent of the council.

As of 2022, the mayor of Rocky Hill is Democrat Robert Uhrik, whose term of office ends December 31, 2022. Members of the Borough Council are Council President Edgar L. "Trey" Delaney (D, 2024), Susan P. Bristol (I, 2023), Jonathan Lee (D, 2022; appointed to serve an unexpired term), Catherine Plunkett (D, 2022), Ken Rizzi (D, 2023; appointed to serve an unexpired term), Denise Varga (D, 2024).

In January 2022, the borough council selected Jonathan Lee from a list of three candidates nominated by the Democratic municipal committee to fill the seat expiring in December 2022 that had been held by Rasheeda Pretto until she resigned from office.

Rasheeda Pretto was appointed to fill the borough council seat expiring in December 2020 that had been held by Robert Uhrik until he stepped down to take office as mayor, though she chose to run for a full three-year term rather than to run for the remainder of the term. In November 2019, Amy Kirtland won a write-in campaign to fill the balance of Uhrik's council term.

At the January 2015 reorganization meeting, the borough council selected Robert Ashbaugh to fill the vacant seat expiring in December 2015 of Jeffrey Donohue, who vacated the seat when he took office as mayor.

=== Federal, state, and county representation ===
Rocky Hill is located in the 12th Congressional District and is part of New Jersey's 16th state legislative district

For the 119th United States Congress, New Jersey's 12th congressional district is represented by Bonnie Watson Coleman (D, Ewing Township). New Jersey is represented in the United States Senate by Democrats Cory Booker (Newark, term ends 2027) and Andy Kim (Moorestown, term ends 2031).

For the 2026–2027 session, the 16th legislative district of the New Jersey Legislature is represented in the New Jersey Senate by Andrew Zwicker (D, South Brunswick) and in the General Assembly by Mitchelle Drulis (D, East Amwell Township) and Roy Freiman (D, Hillsborough Township).

Somerset County is governed by a five-member Board of County Commissioners, whose members are elected at-large to three-year terms of office on a staggered basis, with one or two seats coming up for election each year. At an annual reorganization meeting held in the first week of January, the board selects a Director and deputy director from among its members. As of 2025, Somerset County's County Commissioners are Director Shanel Robinson (D, Franklin Township, term as commissioner ends 2027; term as director ends 2026), Deputy Director Paul Drake (D, Hillsborough Township, term as commissioner and as deputy director ends 2026), Melonie Marano (D, Green Brook Township, 2028), Elizabeth Graner (D, Bernards Township, 2026; elected to serve an unexpired term) and Sara Sooy (D, Bedminster Township, 2027).

Constitutional officers, elected on a countywide basis are Clerk Steve Peter (D, Somerville, 2027), Sheriff Darrin Russo (D, Franklin Township, 2028) and Surrogate Bernice "Tina" Jalloh (D, Franklin Township, 2030).

=== Politics ===
As of March 2011, there were a total of 527 registered voters in Rocky Hill, of which 183 (34.7% vs. 26.0% countywide) were registered as Democrats, 190 (36.1% vs. 25.7%) were registered as Republicans and 151 (28.7% vs. 48.2%) were registered as Unaffiliated. There were 3 voters registered to other parties. Among the borough's 2010 Census population, 77.3% (vs. 60.4% in Somerset County) were registered to vote, including 100% of those ages 18 and over (vs. 80.4% countywide).

United States presidential election results for Rocky Hill
Year	Republican		Democratic		Third party(ies)	
Year	No.	%	No.	%	No.	%
2024	98	23.44%	313	74.88%	7	1.67%
2020	100	21.65%	355	76.84%	7	1.52%
2016	107	25.97%	291	70.63%	14	3.40%
2012	137	34.60%	252	63.64%	7	1.77%
2008	154	36.67%	258	61.43%	8	1.90%
2004	181	42.29%	241	56.31%	6	1.40%
2000	153	41.69%	193	52.59%	21	5.72%

In the 2012 presidential election, Democrat Barack Obama received 63.6% of the vote (252 cast), ahead of Republican Mitt Romney with 34.6% (137 votes), and other candidates with 1.8% (7 votes), among the 397 ballots cast by the borough's 532 registered voters (1 ballot was spoiled), for a turnout of 74.6%. In the 2008 presidential election, Democrat Barack Obama received 258 votes (61.0% vs. 52.1% countywide), ahead of Republican John McCain with 154 votes (36.4% vs. 46.1%) and other candidates with 8 votes (1.9% vs. 1.1%), among the 423 ballots cast by the borough's 511 registered voters, for a turnout of 82.8% (vs. 78.7% in Somerset County). In the 2004 presidential election, Democrat John Kerry received 241 votes (56.3% vs. 47.2% countywide), ahead of Republican George W. Bush with 181 votes (42.3% vs. 51.5%) and other candidates with 6 votes (1.4% vs. 0.9%), among the 428 ballots cast by the borough's 501 registered voters, for a turnout of 85.4% (vs. 81.7% in the whole county).

Gubernatorial election results for Rocky Hill
Year	Republican		Democratic		Third party(ies)	
Year	No.	%	No.	%	No.	%
2025	97	25.39%	281	73.56%	4	1.05%
2021	99	30.28%	225	68.81%	3	0.92%
2017	106	35.33%	184	61.33%	10	3.33%
2013	150	53.96%	119	42.81%	9	3.24%
2009	153	51.00%	122	40.67%	25	8.33%
2005	152	48.25%	155	49.21%	8	2.54%

In the 2013 gubernatorial election, Republican Chris Christie received 54.0% of the vote (150 cast), ahead of Democrat Barbara Buono with 42.8% (119 votes), and other candidates with 3.2% (9 votes), among the 282 ballots cast by the borough's 535 registered voters (4 ballots were spoiled), for a turnout of 52.7%. In the 2009 gubernatorial election, Republican Chris Christie received 153 votes (50.2% vs. 55.8% countywide), ahead of Democrat Jon Corzine with 122 votes (40.0% vs. 34.1%), Independent Chris Daggett with 23 votes (7.5% vs. 8.7%) and other candidates with 2 votes (0.7% vs. 0.7%), among the 305 ballots cast by the borough's 522 registered voters, yielding a 58.4% turnout (vs. 52.5% in the county).

United States Senate election results for Rocky Hill1
Year	Republican		Democratic		Third party(ies)	
Year	No.	%	No.	%	No.	%
2024	102	24.46%	308	73.86%	7	1.68%
2018	114	30.24%	246	65.25%	17	4.51%
2012	137	35.40%	242	62.53%	8	2.07%
2006	159	45.43%	186	53.14%	5	1.43%

United States Senate election results for Rocky Hill2
Year	Republican		Democratic		Third party(ies)	
Year	No.	%	No.	%	No.	%
2020	115	24.78%	341	73.49%	8	1.72%
2014	98	32.78%	190	63.55%	11	3.68%
2013	70	35.18%	126	63.32%	3	1.51%
2008	174	43.61%	214	53.63%	11	2.76%

== Education ==
The Montgomery Township School District is a comprehensive public school district, consisting of five school facilities in Montgomery Township, that serves students in pre-kindergarten through twelfth grade from both Montgomery Township and Rocky Hill. As of the 2020–21 school year, the district, comprised of five schools, had an enrollment of 4,498 students and 403.1 classroom teachers (on an FTE basis), for a student–teacher ratio of 11.2:1. Schools in the district (with 2020–21 enrollment data from the National Center for Education Statistics) are Orchard Hill Elementary School with 727 students in grades Pre-K–2, Village Elementary School with 634 students in grades 3–4, Montgomery Lower Middle School with 743 students in grades 5–6, Montgomery Upper Middle School with 776 students in grades 7–8 and Montgomery High School with 1,577 students in grades 9–12. Rocky Hill had been a non-operating school district that had sent all of its students to the Montgomery Township School District, as part of a sending/receiving relationship. With the termination of the non-operating district, Rocky Hill operates as part of the Montgomery district.

Rocky Hill is home to the Rocky Hill Cooperative Nursery School, which was established in 1957.

== Historic district ==
Rocky Hill Historic District is a 176-acre (71 ha) historic district encompassing the historic core of the borough of Rocky Hill in Somerset County, New Jersey. The village is approximately one square mile and traces its beginnings to the 18th century, when George Washington stayed at Rockingham, and its major growth period to the second quarter of the 19th century, as a stop between Princeton and New Brunswick. The district encompasses a total of 145 buildings, most notable of being the Dutch Reformed Church that was built in 1856 in the Carpenter Gothic style. The district was added to the National Register of Historic Places on July 8, 1982, for its significance in archeology, architecture and commerce. The historic villages of Kingston and Harlingen are also located relatively close by to the village of Rocky Hill.

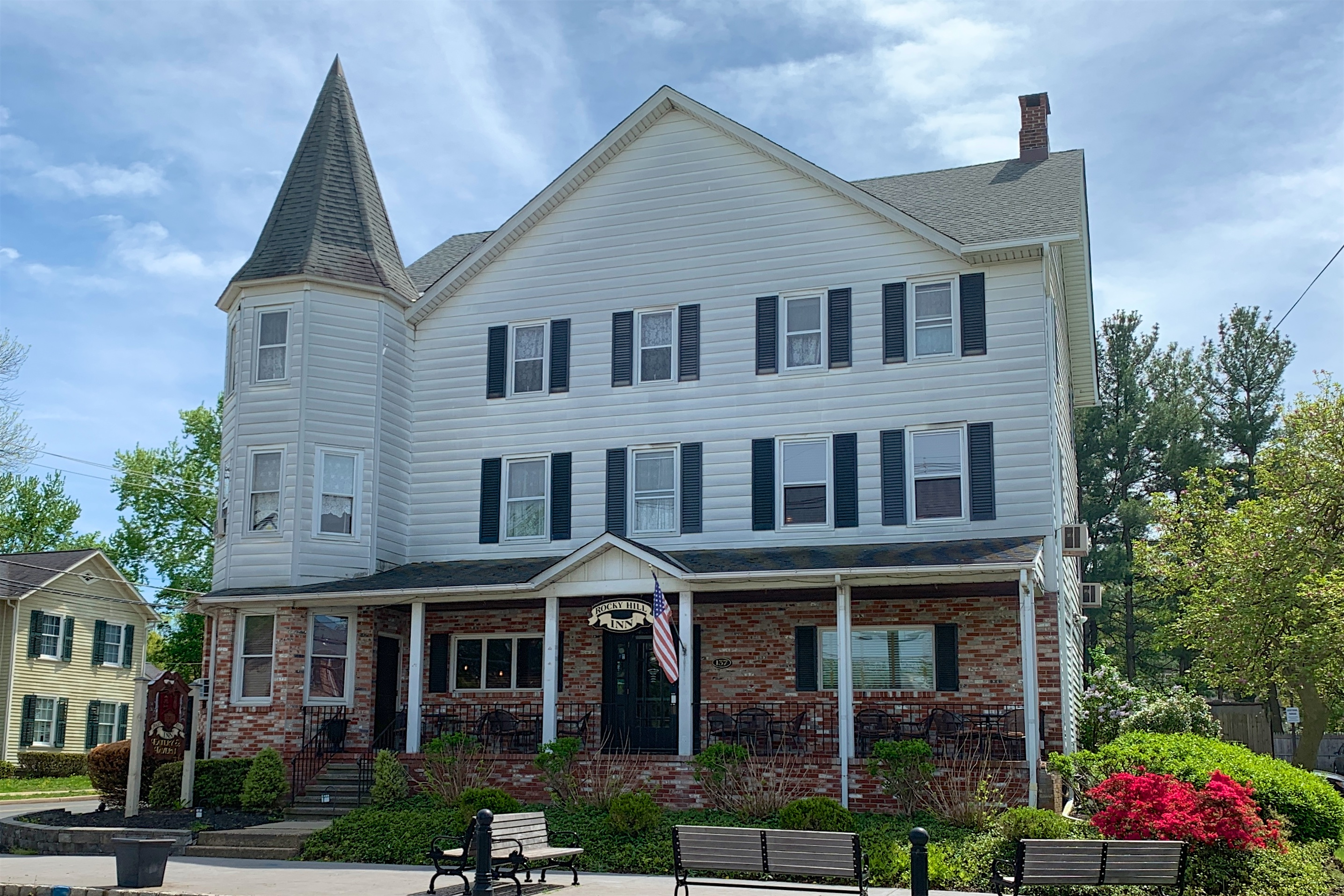
The Rocky Hill Inn, built c. 1825–1830

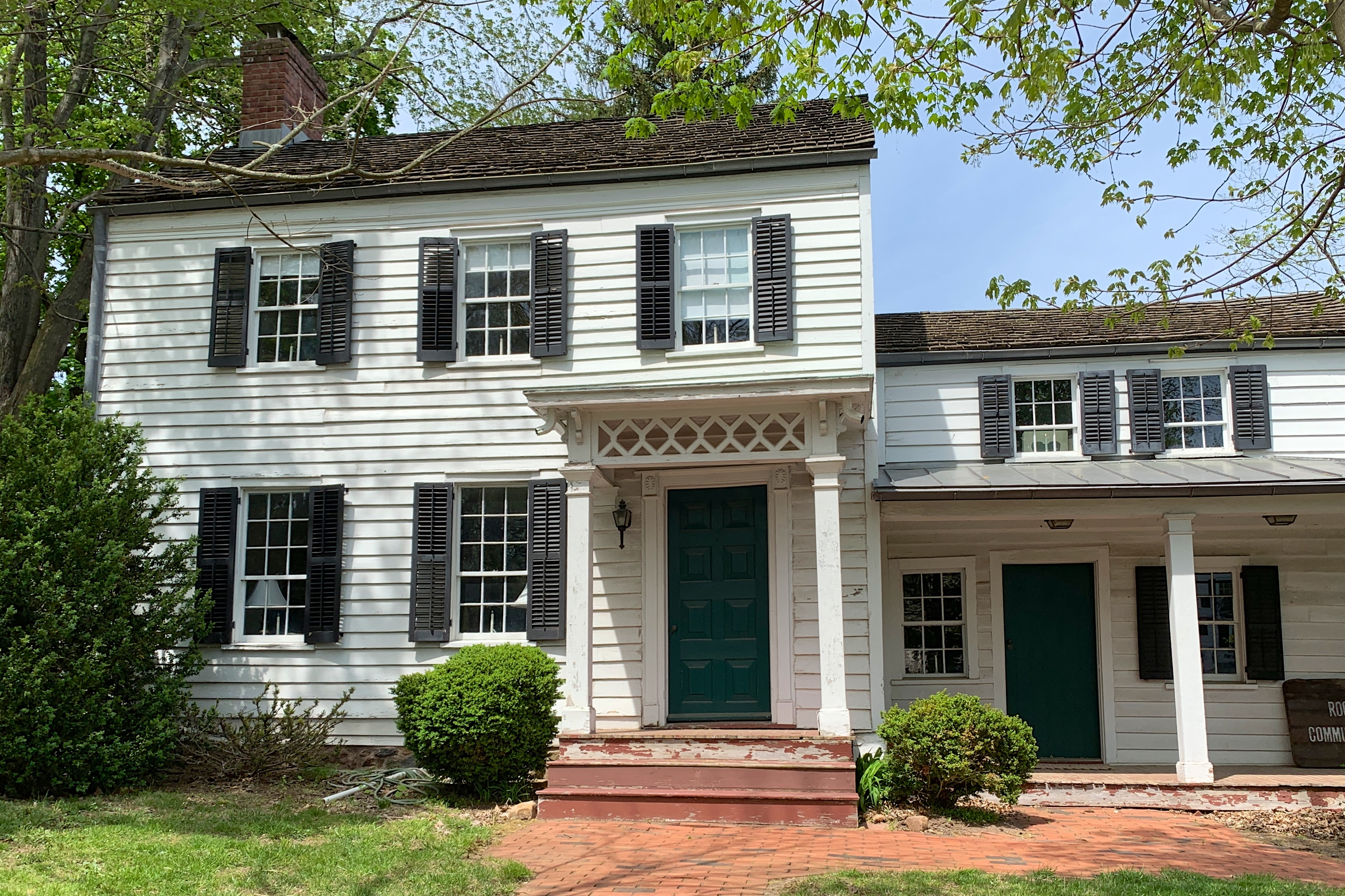
Rocky Hill Community Center, built c. 1840

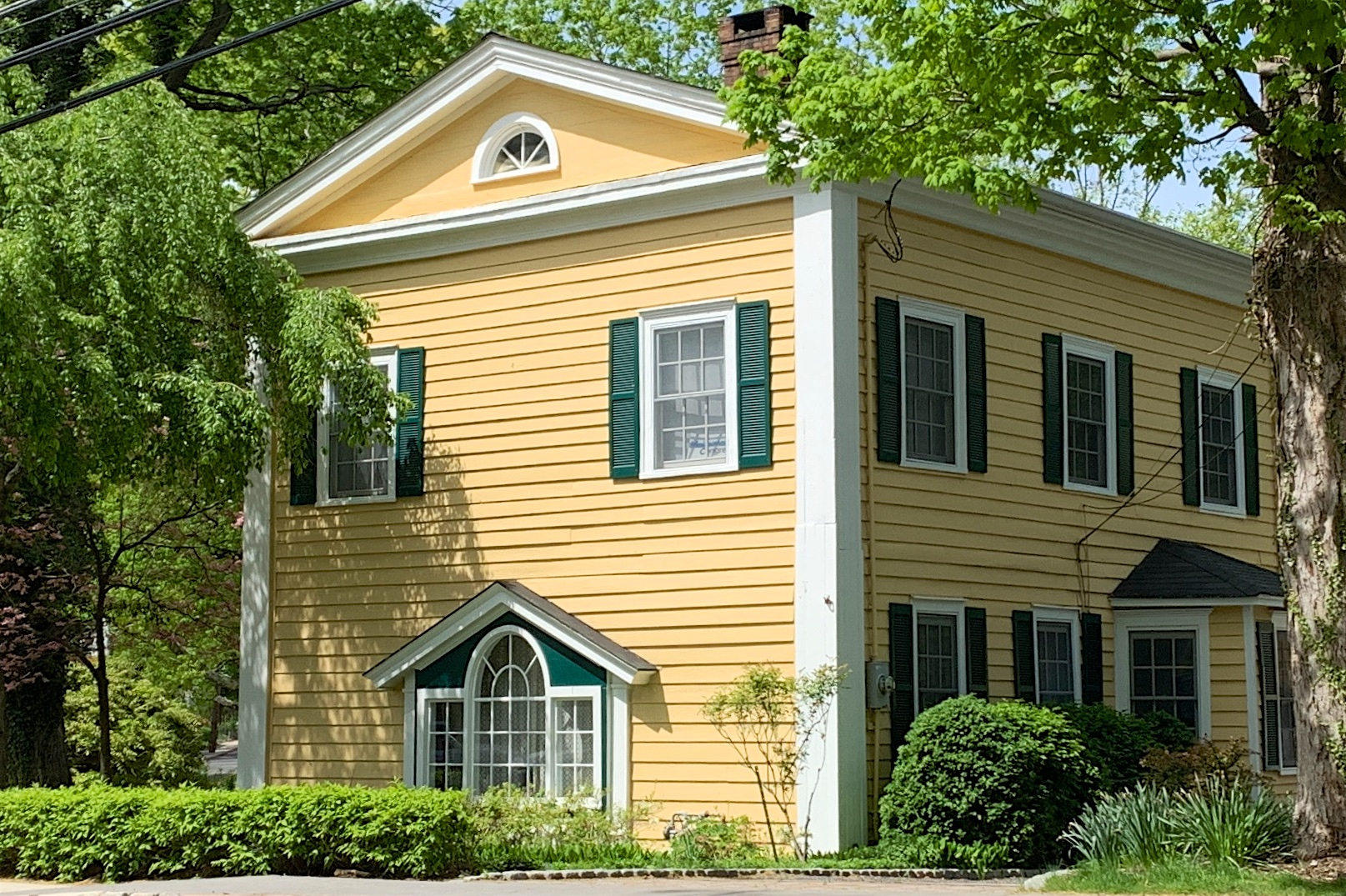
Former schoolhouse, built 1847–48

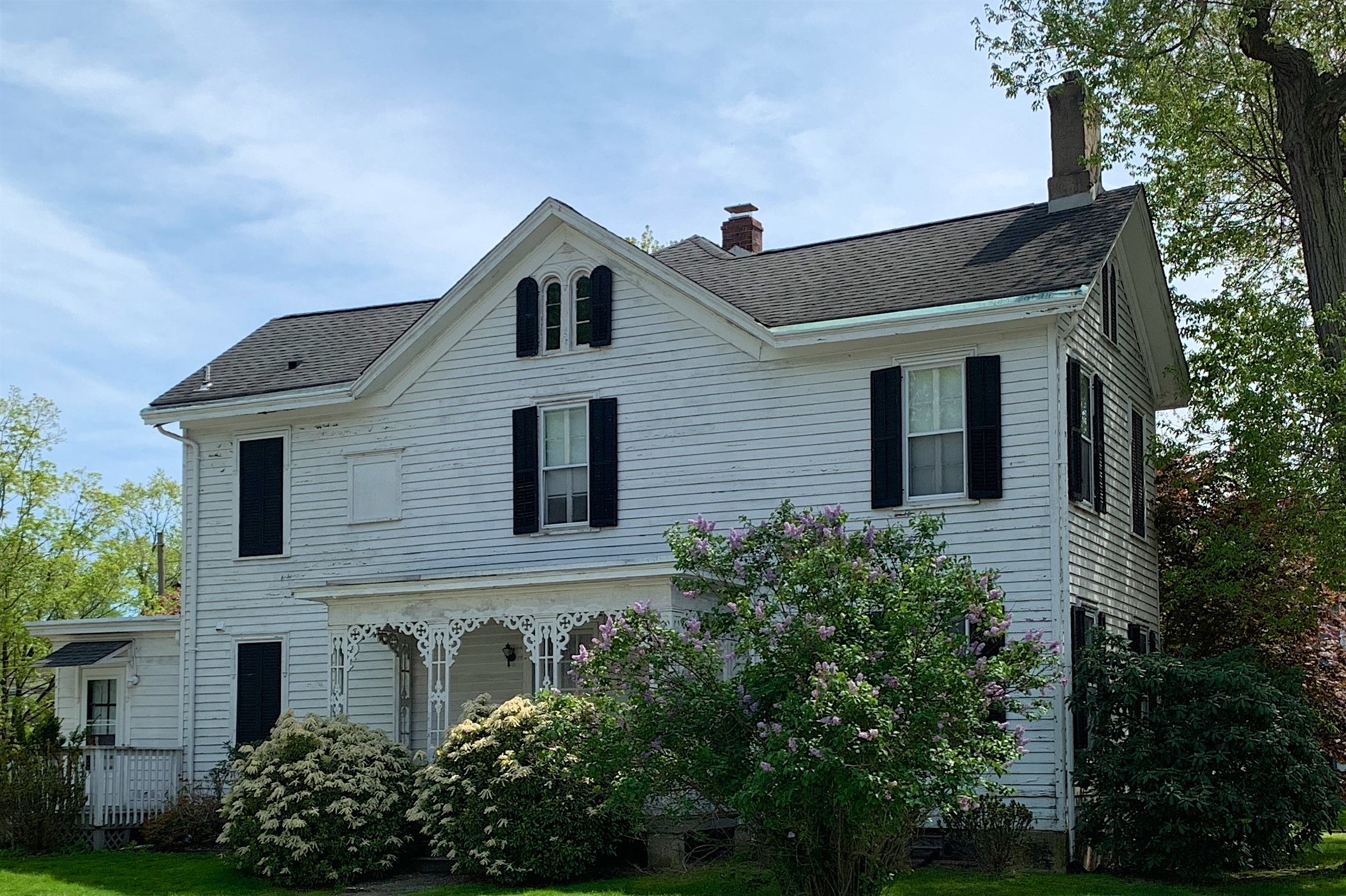
Parsonage for the Dutch Reformed Church, built 1858

== Infrastructure ==
=== Emergency services ===
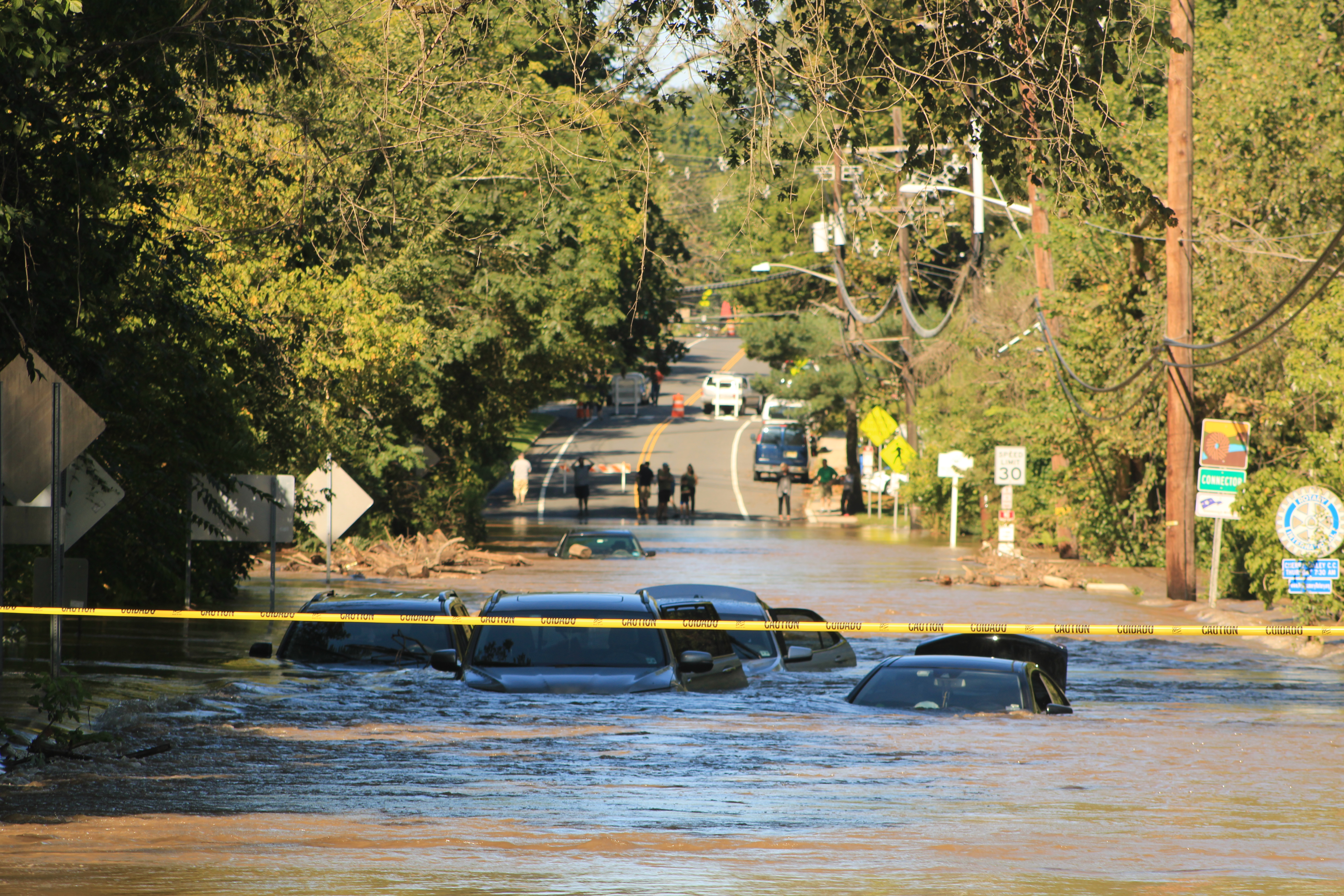
During Hurricane Ida, the Millstone River, and much of the Raritan Basin at large, suffered from massive flooding. Pictured here, is the County Route 518 bridge connecting Rocky Hill and Franklin Township overflowed by the floodwaters from the Millstone River, with abandoned cars submerged.

Police coverage is provided by the New Jersey State Police, from the Kingwood Station in Kingwood Township in Hunterdon County.

Fire protection is offered by the Rocky Hill Hook & Ladder Co #1/Station 53 Fire.

Emergency Medical Services are provided by the Rocky Hill First Aid and Rescue Squad (53 Rescue), which had been temporarily decommissioned as of March 2011 by Resolution 2011–33. An aggressive recruitment and training program under new operational and executive leadership led to Rocky Hill First and Rescue Squad returning to full primary EMS coverage in October 2012, covering all shifts on a scramble basis and offering mutual aid to squads based in Franklin Township, Kingston, and Princeton.

=== Transportation ===
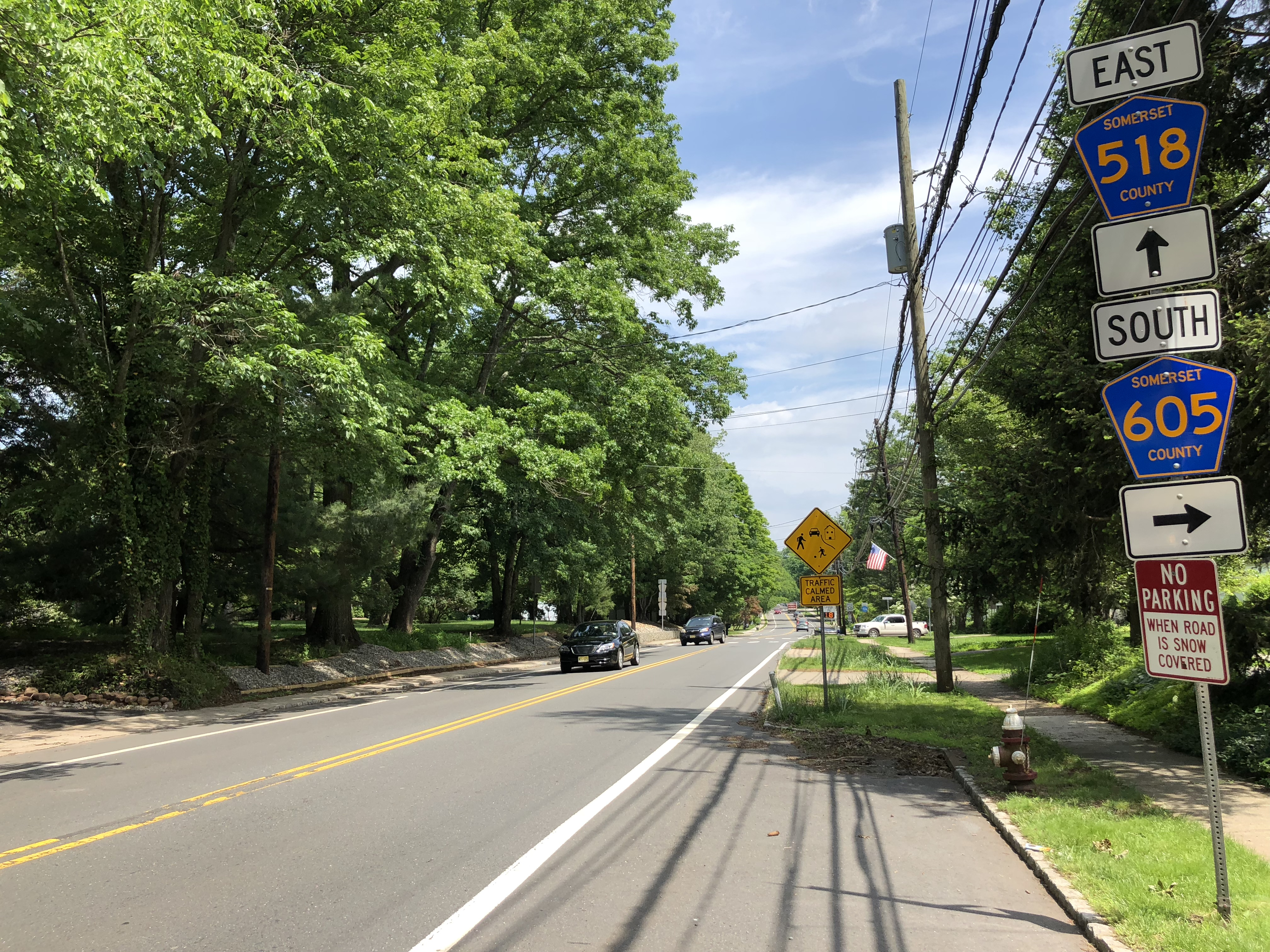
County Route 518 at the intersection with County Route 605 in Rocky Hill

==== Roads and highways ====
As of May 2010, the borough had a total of 4.38 miles (7.05 km) of roadways, of which 2.88 miles (4.63 km) were maintained by the municipality and 1.50 miles (2.41 km) by Somerset County.

The major road that passes through is County Route 518, which runs for 1 mile (1.6 km) through the borough and provides access to U.S. Route 206 to the west and Route 27 to the east. The nearest limited access roads are at least 25 minutes away, such as Interstate 287, Interstate 295 and the New Jersey Turnpike (Interstate 95).

==== Airport ====
Princeton Airport, serving the neighboring borough of Princeton, is located in Montgomery Township, just west of Rocky Hill.

=== Healthcare ===
Penn Medicine Princeton Medical Center is a 355-bed regional non-profit, tertiary and academic medical center located in nearby Plainsboro Township. The hospital services the greater Princeton region in central New Jersey. It is owned by the Penn Medicine Health System and is the only such hospital in the state of New Jersey.

Other nearby regional hospitals and healthcare networks that are accessible to Rocky Hill, include the Somerville division and the New Brunswick division of Robert Wood Johnson University Hospital (RWJUH), along with Saint Peter's University Hospital, also in New Brunswick.

== Notable people ==
People who were born in, residents of, or otherwise closely associated with Rocky Hill include:

- John Berrien (1711–1772), justice of the New Jersey Supreme Court and trustee of the College of New Jersey, now Princeton University
- John Berrien Jr. (1759–1815), army officer during the Revolutionary War
- John Macpherson Berrien (1781–1856), served as United States Attorney General and represented Georgia in the United States Senate
- Anthony Cassar (born 1996), freestyle wrestler who was the NCAA Division I champion
- Tom Malinowski (born 1965), diplomat and politician who represented New Jersey's 7th congressional district from 2019 until the beginning of 2023
- Stephen F. Voorhees (1878–1965), architect in practice in New York City from 1910 until 1959, who was president of the American Institute of Architects from 1935 to 1937.
- George Washington, stayed in Rockingham, the house of the Berrien family, in the late summer of 1783, while Congress was in session in Princeton
