= Rockingham (house) =

Historic house in New Jersey, United States

- U.S. National Register of Historic Places
- New Jersey Register of Historic Places
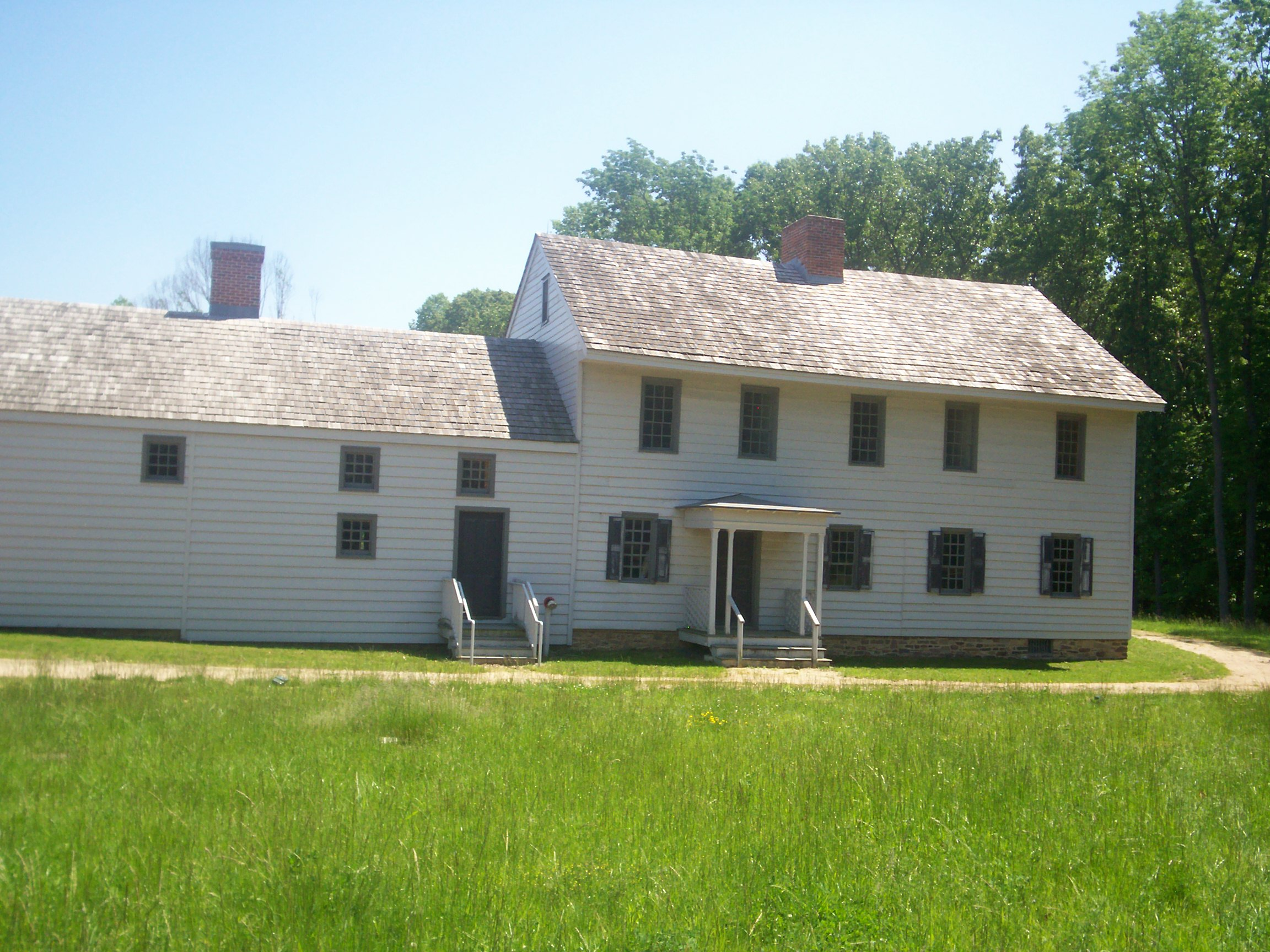
- Back of house in 2007

- Location within Somerset County, New Jersey Location within New Jersey Location within the United States
- Location: 84 Laurel Avenue; Franklin Township, New Jersey
- Coordinates: 40°23′3″N 74°37′8″W
- Area: 5.5 acres (2.2 ha)
- Built: c. 1710
- Architectural style: Colonial vernacular
- NRHP reference No.: 70000394
- NJRHP No.: 2499

Significant dates
- Added to NRHP: December 18, 1970
- Designated NJRHP: September 28, 2009

Rockingham is a historic house that was the home of John Berrien (1711–1772). It served as George Washington's final headquarters of the Revolutionary War. It is located at 84 Laurel Avenue, Franklin Township in Somerset County, New Jersey. It was listed on the National Register of Historic Places in 1970.

The house was originally located on the hillside east of the Millstone River at Rocky Hill. Since the end of the 19th century, it has been moved within southern Franklin Township several times, and is now closer to Kingston than to Rocky Hill. The residence is a featured stop on the Millstone River Valley Scenic Byway.

The oldest portion of the house was built as a two-room, two-story saltbox style house c. 1710; a kitchen and additional rooms were added on in the early 1760s, expanding with the Berrien family. The first reference to the house as "Rockingham" does not appear until a 1783 newspaper advertisement to sell the house. The name was likely given in honor of the Marquess of Rockingham.

The house was added to the National Register of Historic Places on December 18, 1970, for its significance in military and social history. Additional documentation was approved on January 11, 2010, after the house was last moved in 2001.

== John Berrien ==
John Berrien was a surveyor and land agent from Long Island whose business brought him into the Millstone River valley in the 1730s. In 1735, he purchased the small house that overlooked the river.

Berrien eventually was elected as a judge, first in Somerset County. He was eventually appointed to the Supreme Court of New Jersey.

== Marriage and family ==
His first wife, Mary Leonard, of Perth Amboy, New Jersey, died in 1758 without bearing children.

The next year, he married Margaret Eaton, whose father founded Eatontown, New Jersey. Together, John and Margaret had six children, four boys (including John Berrien Jr.) and two girls.

Despite his apparent prosperity and social prominence, John Berrien drowned by suicide, jumping into the Millstone River in 1772, leaving his estate in the hands of his wife. His will split his property equally among her and their six children. He is buried in Princeton Cemetery.

== George Washington ==
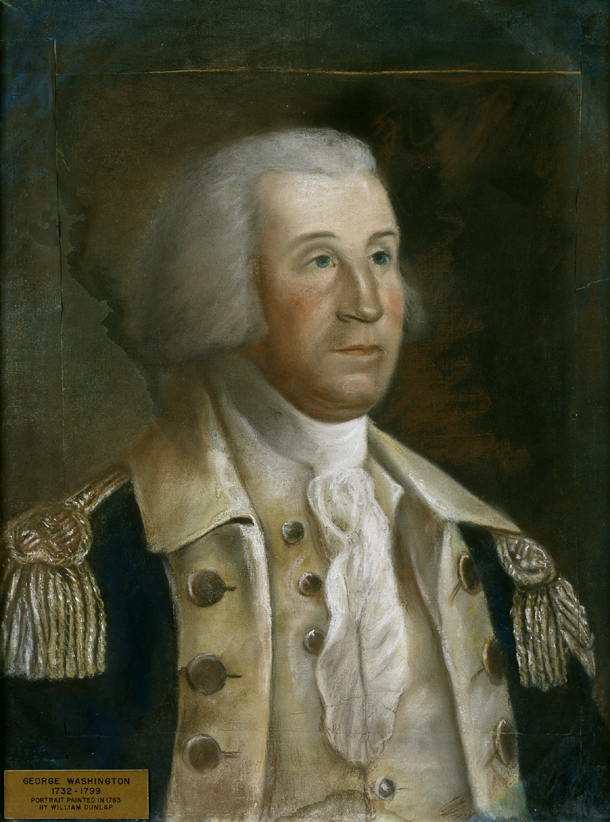
George Washington, painted by William Dunlap during Washington's stay at Rockingham.

General George Washington stayed at Rockingham from August 23, 1783, to November 10, 1783. He was invited to the area by Congress, who were headquartered in Nassau Hall in Princeton while awaiting news of the signing of the Treaty of Paris to officially end the Revolutionary War.

Washington was accompanied by three aides-de-camp, a troop of between twelve and twenty-four life guards, his servants and, until early October, his wife Martha Washington. He spent his time at Rockingham entertaining Congress and other local figures until word of the end of the War reached him on October 31. On November 2, Washington composed his Farewell Orders to the Armies of the United States at Rockingham, a document dismissing his troops and announcing his retirement from the Army.

== House sold ==
In 1802, Margaret Berrien sold the house to Frederick Cruser, who continued to expand the property. Storage space and servants sleeping quarters were added to the kitchen wing, a second-story balcony was added to the front of the house, and the roofline raised to accommodate a third-story attic. The Cruser family occupied Rockingham until 1841. The house changed hands many times until the 1890s, when the property was bought by the Rocky Hill Quarry Company.

== Moves ==
=== 1897 move ===
The first move of the house was in 1897 to remove it from the Rocky Hill Quarry Company property in Rocky Hill. Kate McFarlane and Josephine Swann helped create the Washington Headquarters Association of Rocky Hill, which raised the money to purchase the structure and move it away from the quarry. In August 1897, the house was opened to the public. In 1935, ownership was turned over to the state of New Jersey.

=== 1956 move ===
By 1956, the quarry had expanded, and the house again was too close to active quarrying. Rockingham was moved a half mile eastward along County Route 518.

=== 2001 move ===
The house made its final move in 2001. It sits on a 27-acre (110,000 m^{2}) lot on Kingston-Rocky Hill Road, adjacent to the Delaware and Raritan Canal, on the outskirts of Kingston. The site reopened to the public in 2004 and is open year-round.

== Timeline ==
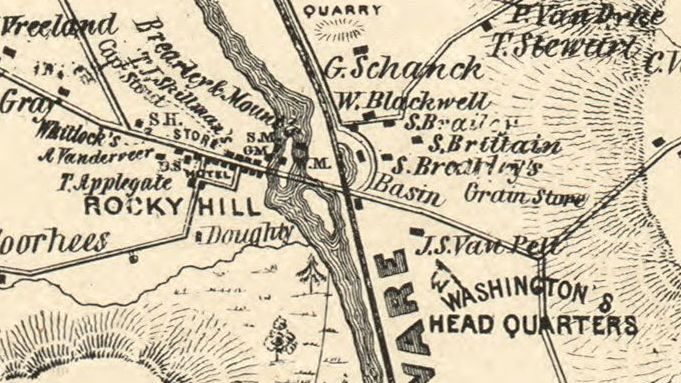
1850 map showing the location of Rockingham, then owned by J.S. (James Stryker) Van Pelt

Rockingham has been owned by many individuals and moved three times since it was built:

- c. 1710 House built on the hillside east of the Millstone River at Rocky Hill: 40°23′54″N 74°37′32″W
- 1735 John Berrien buys house and property
- 1783 George Washington uses Rockingham as headquarters
- 1802 House sold to Frederick Cruser
- 1841 House sold to Henry Duryee
- 1847 House sold to James Stryker Van Pelt
- 1869 House sold to David H. Mount
- 1872 House sold to Martin A. Howell
- c. 1890 House and property sold to Rocky Hill Quarry Company
- 1897 House moved away from quarry, first move: 40°23′52″N 74°37′15″W
- 1956 House moved farther away from quarry, second move: 40°24′10″N 74°36′50″W
- 2001 House moved near Kingston, third move: 40°23′3″N 74°37′8″W

== Gallery ==
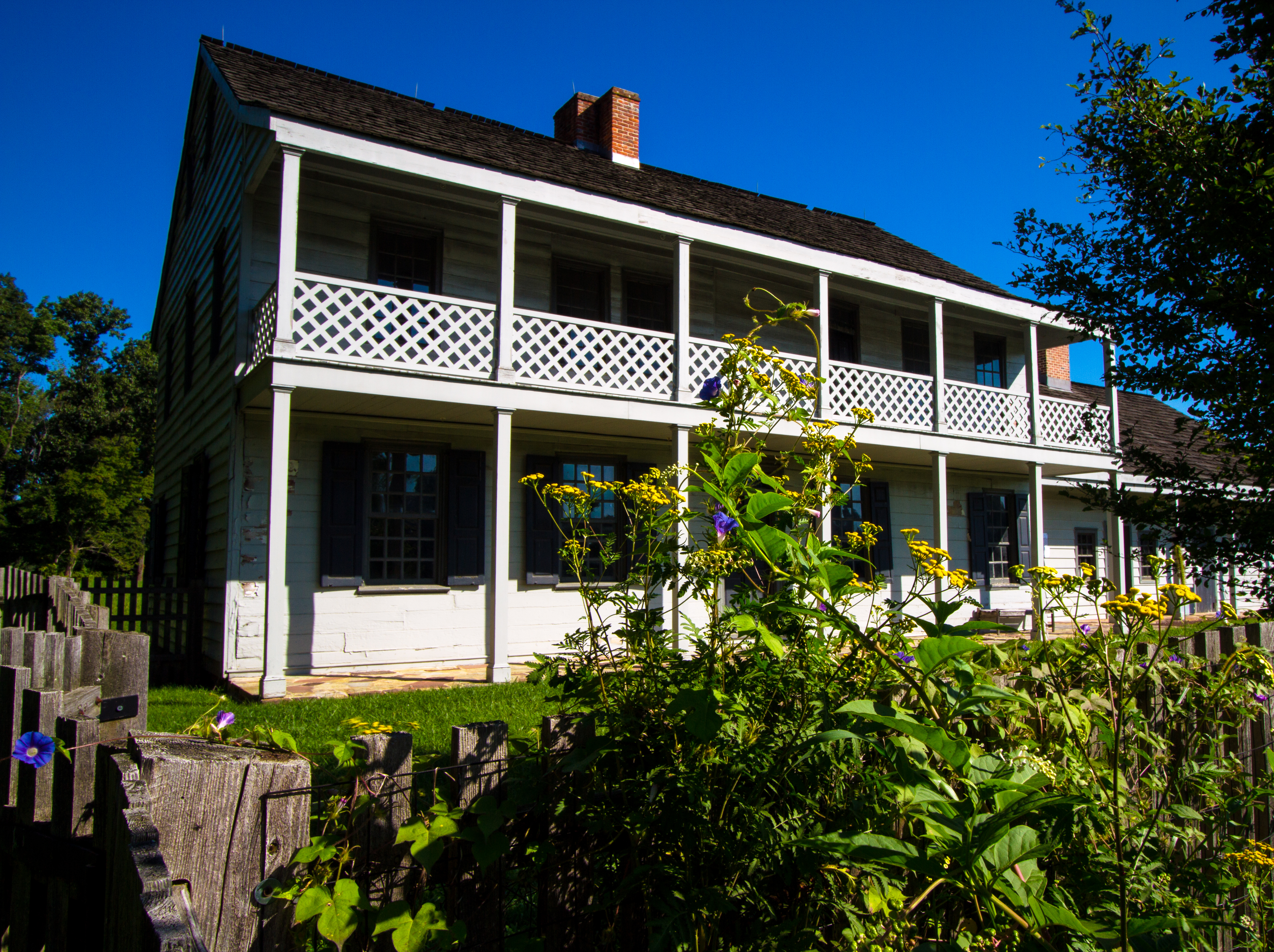
Front of Rockingham in 2014

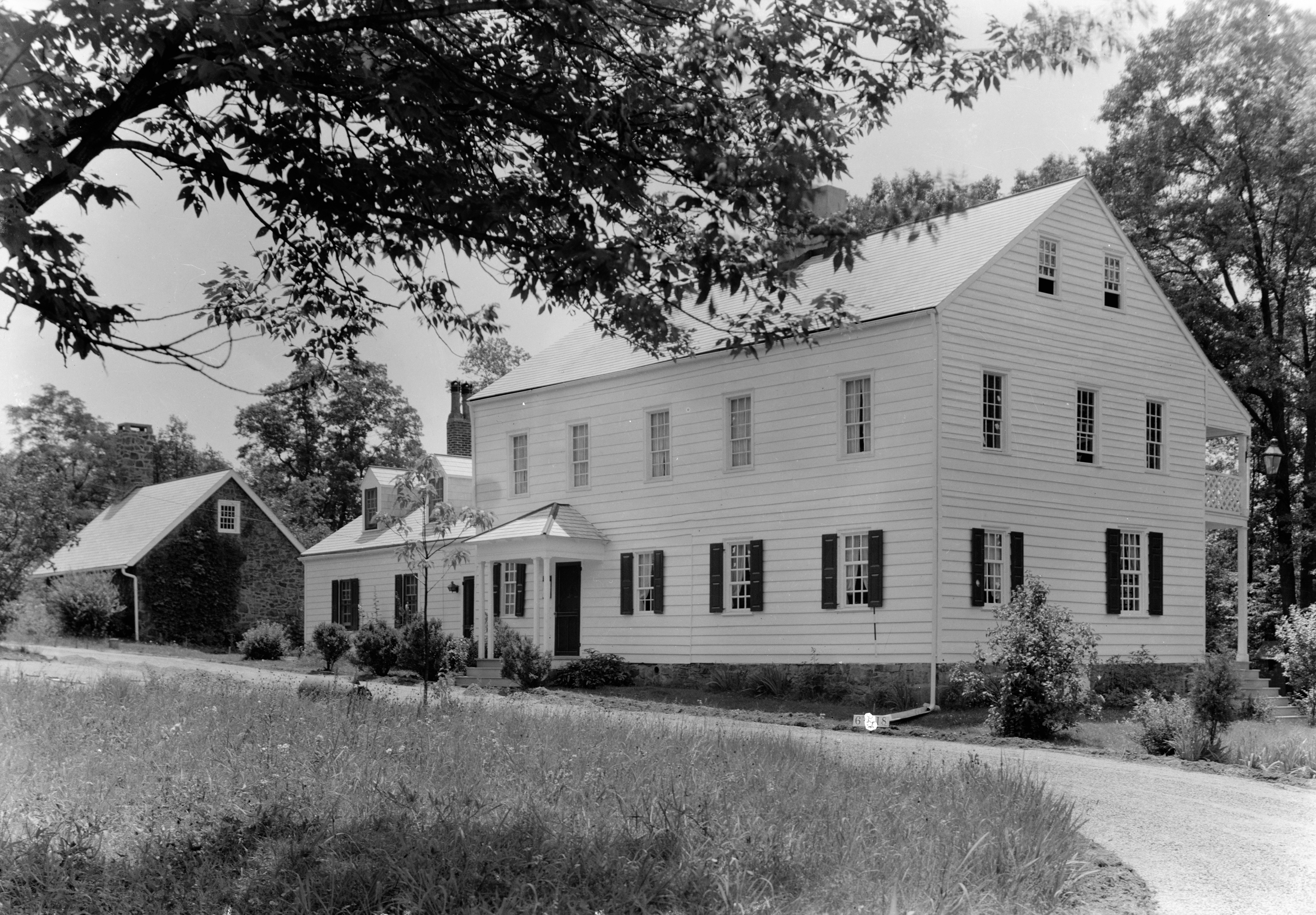
Back of Rockingham c. 1910 with stone outer house still in place before the move

== See also ==
- List of the oldest buildings in New Jersey
- List of Washington's Headquarters during the Revolutionary War
