= Heathcote Brook =

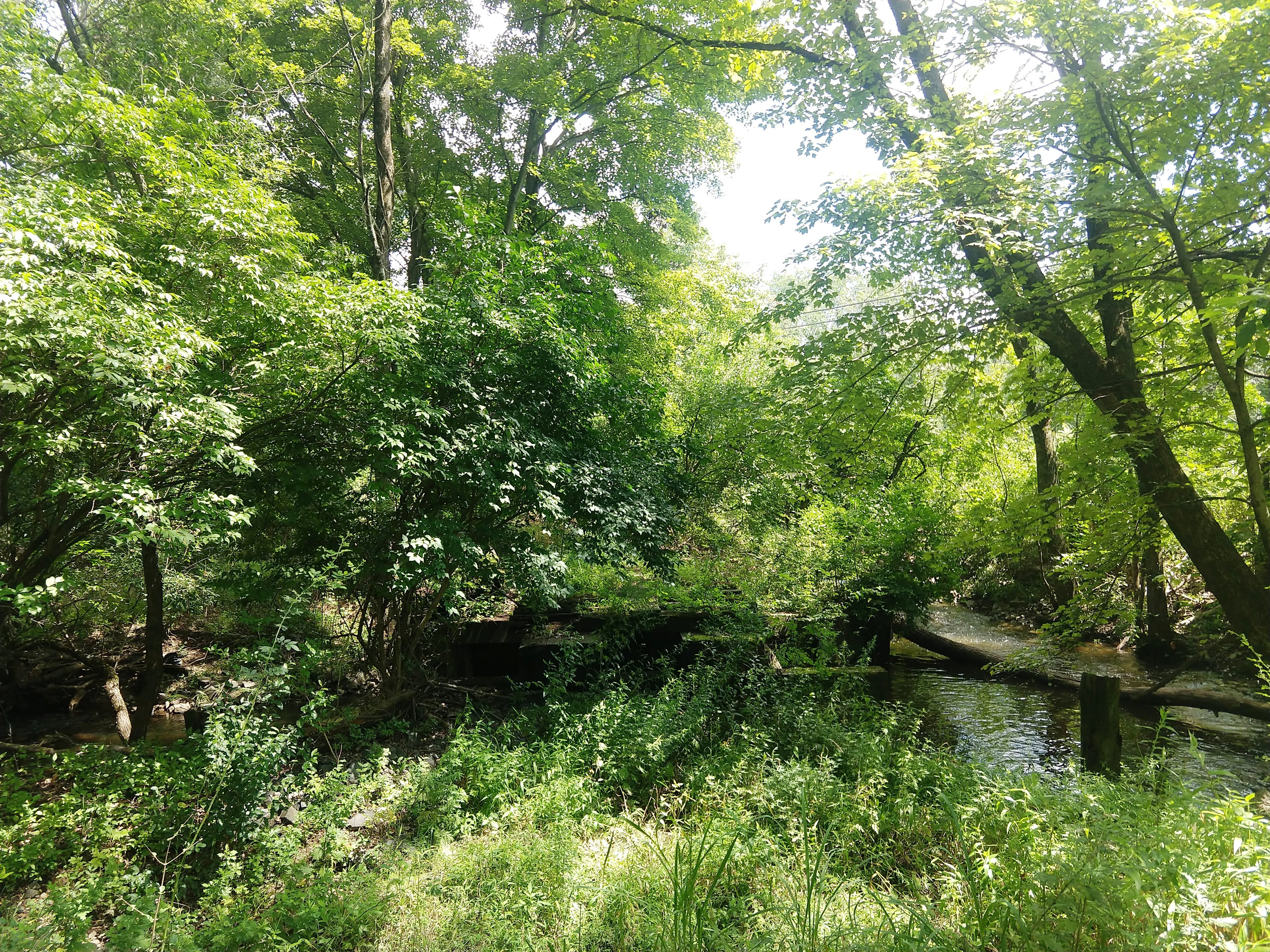
- Heathcote Brook at former Kingston Branch railroad bridge

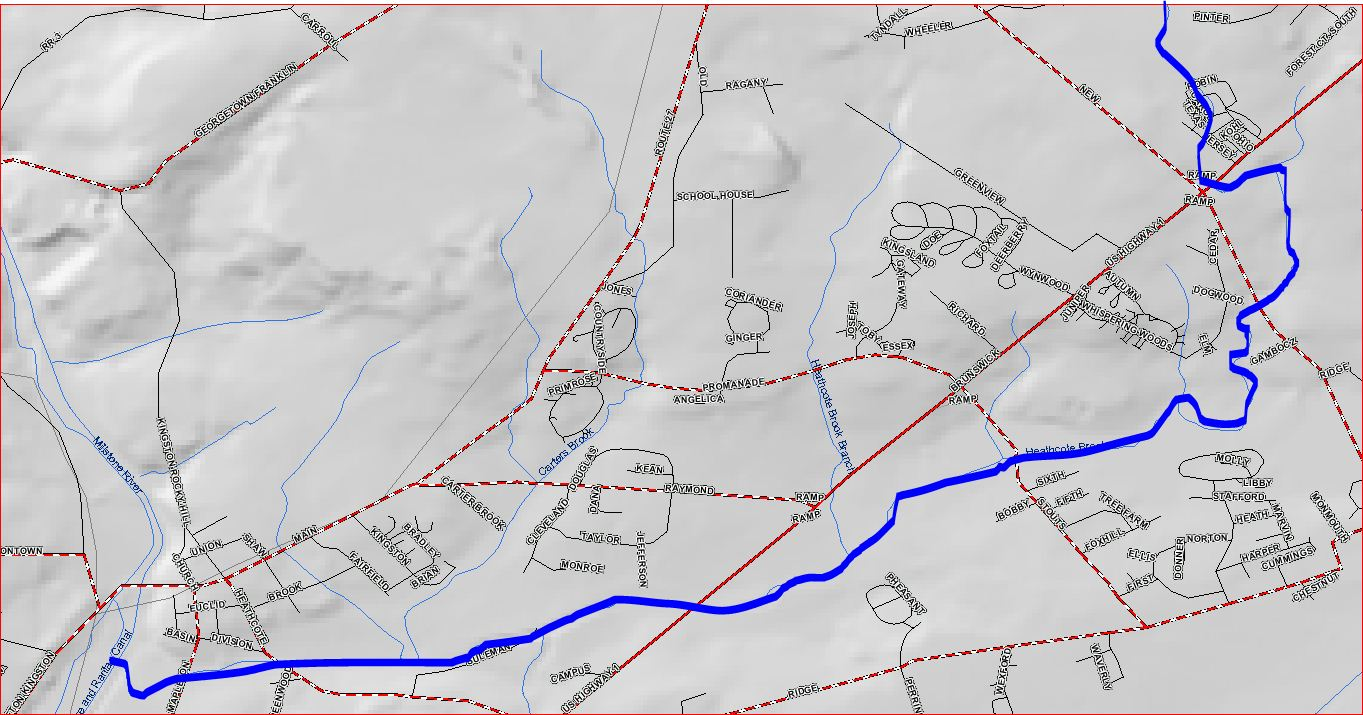
- Heathcote Brook map

Location
- Country: United States

Physical characteristics
- Source
  - coordinates: 40°24′32″N 74°33′34″W
- Mouth
  - coordinates: 40°22′25″N 74°37′12″W
  - elevation: 52 ft (16 m)

Basin features
- Progression: Millstone River, Raritan River, Atlantic Ocean
- River system: Raritan River system
- Tributaries
  - left: Carters Brook, Heathcote Brook Branch

Heathcote Brook, also known as Heathcote Run, is a tributary of the Millstone River in central New Jersey in the United States.

== Course ==
Heathcote Brook starts at 40°24′32″N 74°33′34″W, near the intersection of New Road and Route 1. It runs through a residential area and crosses Route 1. It runs parallel to Route 1, picking up several tributaries until it crosses Route 1. It then joins with the Carters Brook, crosses Heathcote Road, and drains into the Millstone River at 40°22′25″N 74°37′12″W.

== Accessibility ==
Numerous road crossings make it easily accessible.

== Tributaries ==
- Carters Brook
- Heathcote Brook Branch

== Sister tributaries ==
- Beden Brook
- Bear Brook
- Cranbury Brook
- Devils Brook
- Harrys Brook
- Indian Run Brook
- Little Bear Brook
- Millstone Brook
- Peace Brook
- Rocky Brook
- Royce Brook
- Simonson Brook
- Six Mile Run
- Stony Brook
- Ten Mile Run
- Van Horn Brook

== See also ==
- List of rivers of New Jersey
