= Devils Brook =

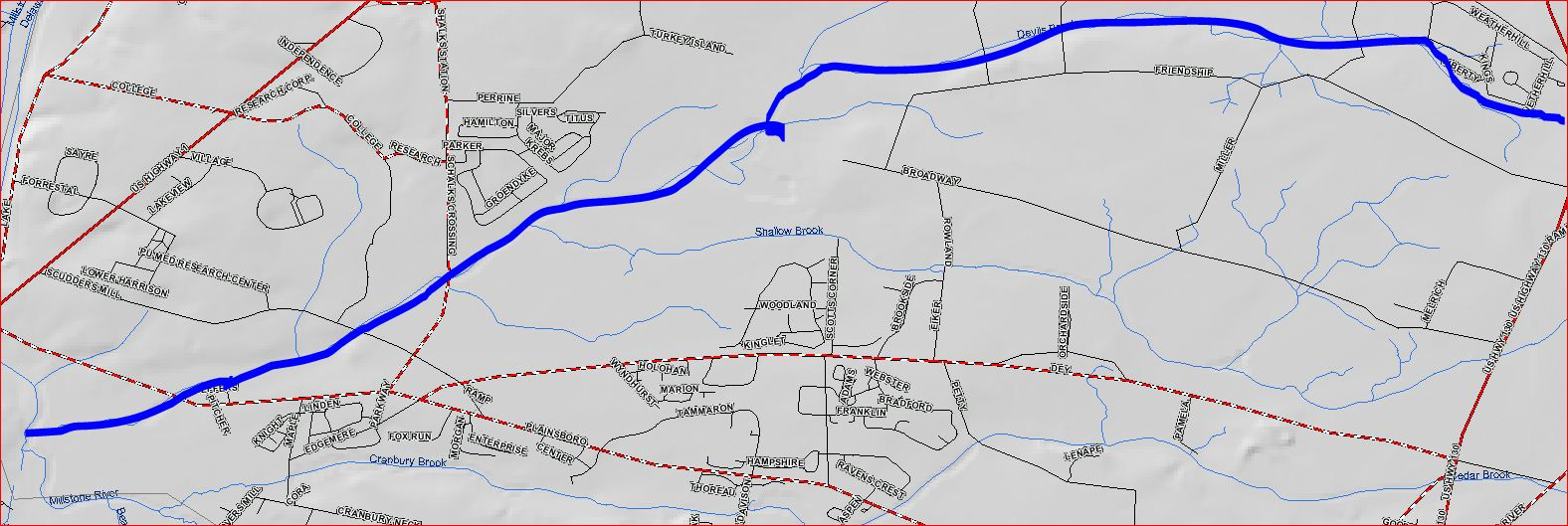
- Devils Brook map

Location
- Country: United States

Physical characteristics
- Source
  - coordinates: 40°21′22″N 74°29′47″W
- Mouth
  - coordinates: 40°19′49″N 74°37′27″W
  - elevation: 59 ft (18 m)

Basin features
- Progression: Millstone River, Raritan River, Atlantic Ocean
- River system: Raritan River system
- Tributaries
  - left: Shallow Brook

Devils Brook is a tributary of the Millstone River in central New Jersey in the United States.

It is a moderately large brook with numerous unnamed tributaries.

== Course ==
The Devils Brook starts at 40°21′22″N 74°29′47″W, near exit 8A on the New Jersey Turnpike. It flows west, following Friendship Road. It then passes through the Plainsboro Preserve, feeding a marsh. It joins with Shallow Brook, its tributary, and crosses Scudders Mill Road, also known as CR-614. It crosses Princeton-Plainsboro Road in a dammed section known as Gordon Pond. It then drains into the Millstone River at 40°19′49″N 74°37′27″W.

== Accessibility ==
The Devils Brook drains a large area in Mercer and Middlesex counties. There are many tributaries that cross roads, so it is easily accessible.

== Tributaries ==
- Shallow Brook

== Sister tributaries ==
- Beden Brook
- Bear Brook
- Cranbury Brook
- Harrys Brook
- Heathcote Brook
- Indian Run Brook
- Little Bear Brook
- Millstone Brook
- Peace Brook
- Rocky Brook
- Royce Brook
- Simonson Brook
- Six Mile Run
- Stony Brook
- Ten Mile Run
- Van Horn Brook

== See also ==
- List of rivers of New Jersey
