= Bear Brook (Millstone River tributary) =

Location
- Country: United States

Physical characteristics
- Source
  - coordinates: 40°14′5″N 74°32′18″W
- Mouth
  - coordinates: 40°19′30″N 74°37′4″W

Basin features
- Progression: Millstone River, Raritan River, Atlantic Ocean
- River system: Raritan River

Bear Brook is a tributary of the Millstone River in central New Jersey in the United States.

== Course ==
Bear Brook starts at 40°14′5″N 74°32′18″W, near exit 8 on the New Jersey Turnpike. It flows west, crossing the New Jersey Turnpike and Route 130 and flowing through the Bear Brook Park Acquisition. It turns northeast to join another tributary and continues flowing northwest, receiving more tributaries. It crosses CR-571 (Princeton Hightstown Road) and Clarksville Road before draining into the Millstone River at 40°19′30″N 74°37′4″W, near Princeton Junction.

== Sister tributaries ==
- Beden Brook
- Cranbury Brook
- Devils Brook
- Harrys Brook
- Heathcote Brook
- Indian Run Brook
- Little Bear Brook
- Millstone Brook
- Peace Brook
- Rocky Brook
- Royce Brook
- Simonson Brook
- Six Mile Run
- Stony Brook
- Ten Mile Run
- Van Horn Brook

== See also ==
- List of rivers of New Jersey
