= Harrys Brook =

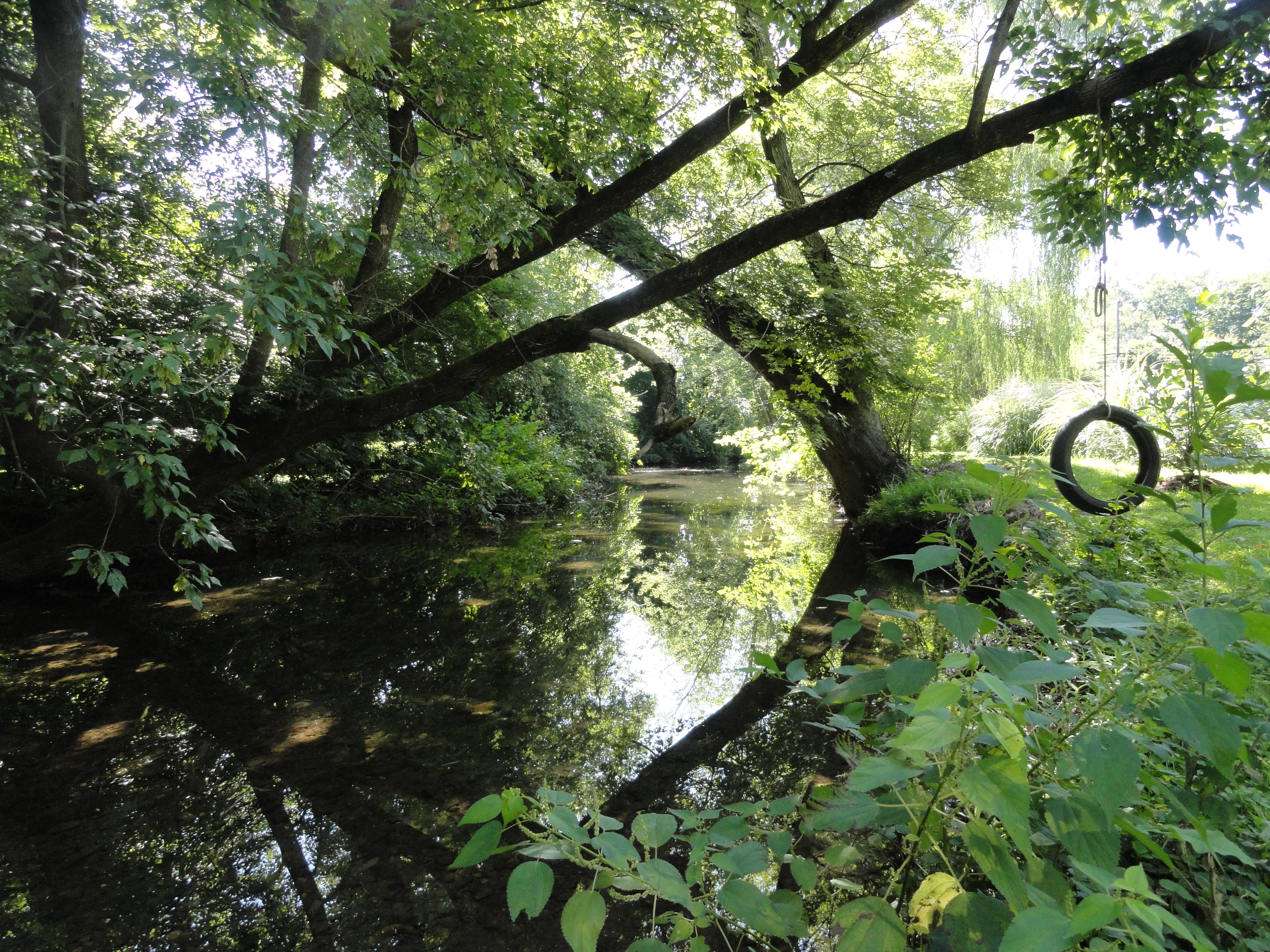

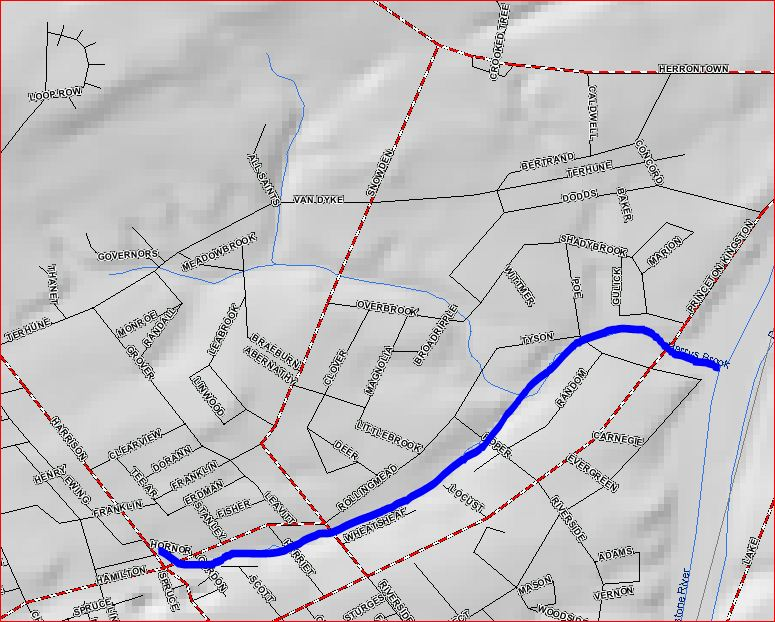
- Map of Harrys Brook

Location
- Country: United States

Physical characteristics
- Source
  - coordinates: 40°21′32″N 74°38′54″W
- Mouth
  - coordinates: 40°21′57″N 74°37′40″W
  - elevation: 52 ft (16 m)

Basin features
- Progression: Millstone River, Raritan River, Atlantic Ocean
- River system: Raritan River system

Harrys Brook, also known as the H. Greenlands Brook, is a tributary of the Millstone River in Mercer County, New Jersey in the United States.

== Course ==
Harrys Brook starts at 40°21′32″N 74°38′54″W, near Princeton North. It flows northeast though the city before meeting with another tributary from the northwest. It crosses Route 27 and drains into the Millstone River at 40°21′57″N 74°37′40″W.

== Sister tributaries ==
- Beden Brook
- Bear Brook
- Cranbury Brook
- Devils Brook
- Heathcote Brook
- Indian Run Brook
- Little Bear Brook
- Millstone Brook
- Peace Brook
- Rocky Brook
- Royce Brook
- Simonson Brook
- Six Mile Run
- Stony Brook
- Ten Mile Run
- Van Horn Brook

== See also ==
- List of rivers of New Jersey
