= Royce Brook =

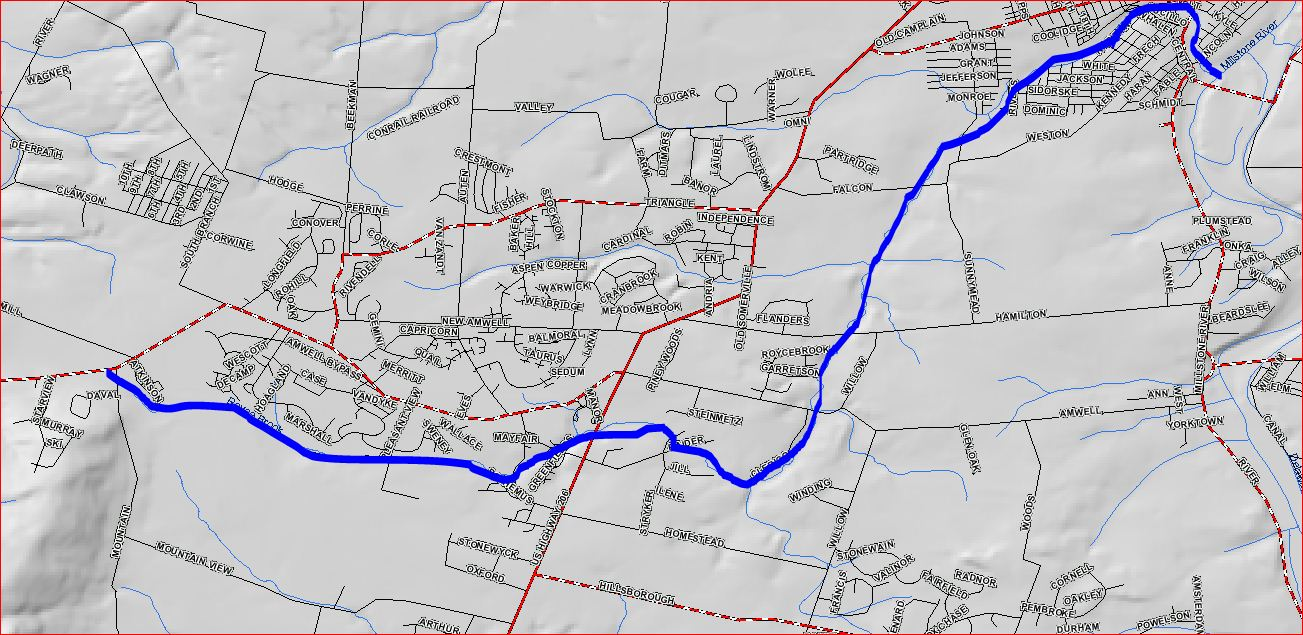
- Map of Royce Brook

Location
- Country: United States

Physical characteristics
- Source
  - coordinates: 40°30′6″N 74°41′48″W
- Mouth
  - coordinates: 40°31′51″N 74°35′14″W
  - elevation: 20 ft (6.1 m)

Basin features
- Progression: Millstone River, Raritan River, Atlantic Ocean
- River system: Raritan River system

Royce Brook (sometimes referred to as Royces Brook, Royces Branch, or Royce Brook River) is a tributary of the Millstone River in Hillsborough and Manville, New Jersey in the United States.

== Path ==
Royce Brook does not have a definite starting point, as it consists of several bodies of water flowing into it within its 16-square-mile (41 km^{2}) watershed. However, the website for the Royce Brook Watershed states that it starts at the edge of Sourland Mountain at 40°30′6″N 74°41′48″W. It tends to run north-east and eventually empties into the Millstone River in Manville at 40°31′51″N 74°35′14″W, which is subsequently deposited into the Raritan River.

== Name ==
The origins of the creek's name is unknown, but there is a street that runs parallel to it in Hillsborough called, "Royce Brook Road." Also, there is a local golf club called, "The Royce Brook Golf Club."

One of the earliest settlers of Hillsborough (other than Lenape) was a man named John Royce (also spelled Royse). It is documented that during the late 17th century he owned a large piece of land. This land is pretty much what is now the entire town of Manville. A map titled "Plan of Somerset County in the Province of New Jersey" surveyed by Benjamin Morgan in 1766 and copied from the original by Lieutenant I Hills Assistant Engineer, identifies a stream as Royses Brook flowing through lot 227, which was owned by a John Royse, before emptying into the Millstone River.

== Flooding ==
As with the Millstone River, the Royce Brook can flood to extreme heights. The power of Hurricane Floyd was such that it literally changed the landscape surrounding the creek and deposited much sediment into the lands surrounding it. A resident whose backyard borders Royce Brook estimates that during Hurricane Floyd, the average height in that particular area rose at least 7 feet (2.1 m) - compared to its estimated average at 1-foot (0.30 m). The majority of rainstorms with enough water erode the riverbed and deposit debris and pollution into the river.

A storm on 15 April 2007 deposited over 7 inches (180 mm) of rain into Royce Brook, which was the most recorded since 1882. However, flooding was less severe than during Hurricane Floyd, which deposited approximately 6 to 7 inches (180 mm) of rain, and therefore resulted in less damage than the April flood.

== Pollution ==
Royce Brook was tested for pollutants during rainstorms in July and October 2006. Tests included dissolved oxygen (DO), nitrate, phosphate, total dissolved solids, electroconductivity, temperature, and pH. It was found to have low dissolved oxygen levels and very high phosphate levels. The researcher of this project suggests that such contamination is from farms or lawns upstream which could be using soils with pesticides on them (which contain phosphates), and the phosphates will flow into Royce Brook during a rainstorm was runoff. High levels of phosphates have been documented as encouraging too many aquatic plants to grow, using dissolved oxygen from the water (limiting it to the fish), which could be the situation in Royce Brook. Additional evidence of high phosphate levels is that the pH of Royce Brook consistently tested as basic, and fertilizers tend to be basic. Also, water flowing over large stones in Royce Brook usually results in large bubbles on the surface of the water, which is usually regarded as a result of high phosphate levels.

An earlier research project was conducted in the late summer of 2004, at the same location of where the 2006 testing occurred. It tested for some of the same factors (e.g. DO, nitrate, phosphate, and pH) as the 2006 test; but was not tested during a rainstorm. There were similar results: dissolved oxygen levels were low, phosphate levels were high, and pH levels were basic (even though the pH tested as normal).

A high level of pollution exists in Royce Brook, especially rusting iron, soda cans, plastic bottles, and plastic bags which was documented in the research project of the summer 2006.

== Roads and railroads ==
A series of roads and railroads cross over Royce Brook.

In Hillsborough

- U.S. Route 206
- Amwell Road
- Hamilton Road
- Falcon Road
- Sunnymead Road
- Central New York Railroad

In Manville

- Whalen Street
- South Main Street

== Sister tributaries ==
- Beden Brook
- Bear Brook
- Cranbury Brook
- Devils Brook
  - Shallow Brook
- Harrys Brook
- Heathcote Brook
- Indian Run Brook
- Little Bear Brook
- Millstone Brook
- Peace Brook
- Rocky Brook
- Simonson Brook
- Six Mile Run
- Stony Brook
- Ten Mile Run
- Van Horn Brook

== Notes ==
1. ^ http://www.sbmwa.org/ws_assess_lvl2.php?id=C0_179_50

== See also ==
- List of rivers of New Jersey
