= Little Bear Brook =

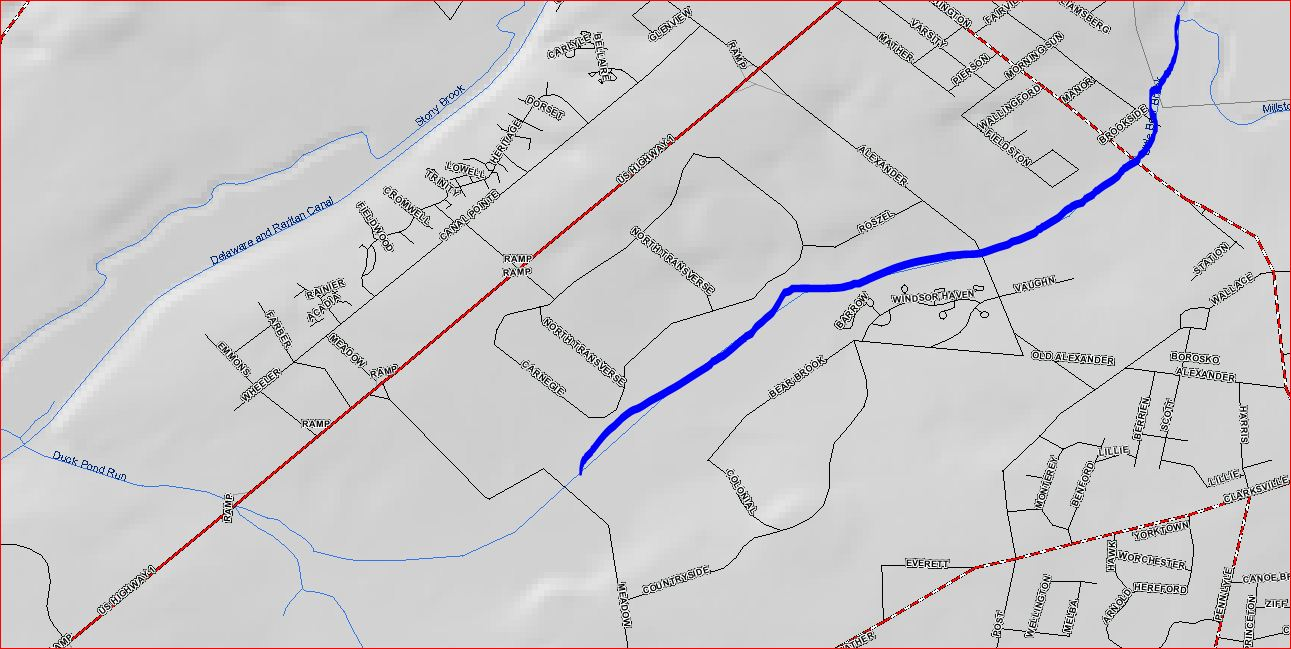
- Map of Little Bear Brook

Location
- Country: United States

Physical characteristics
- Source
  - coordinates: 40°19′1″N 74°38′13″W
- Mouth
  - coordinates: 40°19′43″N 74°37′29″W
  - elevation: 56 ft (17 m)

Basin features
- Progression: Millstone River, Raritan River, Atlantic Ocean
- River system: Raritan River system

Little Bear Brook is a tributary of the Millstone River in Mercer County, New Jersey in the United States.

== Course ==
The Little Bear Brook's source is at 40°19′1″N 74°38′13″W. It flows northeast, crossing Alexander Road and Washington Road (CR-571) before draining into the Millstone River at 40°19′43″N 74°37′29″W.

== Sister tributaries ==
- Beden Brook
- Bear Brook
- Cranbury Brook
- Devils Brook
- Harrys Brook
- Heathcote Brook
- Indian Run Brook
- Millstone Brook
- Peace Brook
- Rocky Brook
- Royce Brook
- Simonson Brook
- Six Mile Run
- Stony Brook
- Ten Mile Run
- Van Horn Brook

== See also ==
- List of rivers of New Jersey
