= Heathcote Brook Branch =

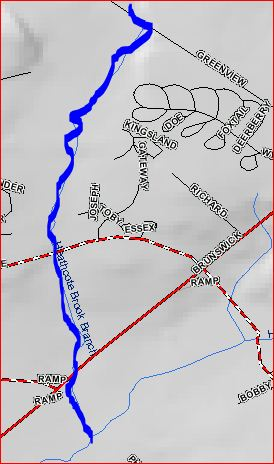
- Heathcote Brook Branch Map

Location
- Country: United States

Physical characteristics
- Source
  - coordinates: 40°24′9″N 74°34′31″W
- Mouth
  - coordinates: 40°22′36″N 74°34′39″W
  - elevation: 72 ft (22 m)

Basin features
- Progression: Heathcote Brook, Millstone River, Raritan River, Atlantic Ocean
- River system: Raritan River system

The Heathcote Brook Branch is a tributary of Heathcote Brook in southern Middlesex County, New Jersey in the United States.

Heathcote Brook Branch flows generally parallel to Carters Brook, another tributary of Heathcote Brook.

== Course ==
The Heathcote Brook Branch source is at 40°24′9″N 74°34′31″W, about equidistant from Route 1 and Route 27. It flows between several housing developments and crosses Promenade Boulevard. It then crosses Route 1 and drains into Heathcote Brook at 40°22′36″N 74°34′39″W.

== Accessibility ==
The Heathcote Brook Branch is small and crosses few roads, so it is not easily accessible. However it may be accessed from Heathcote Brook.

== Sister tributary ==
- Carters Brook

== See also ==
- List of rivers of New Jersey
