= Beden Brook =

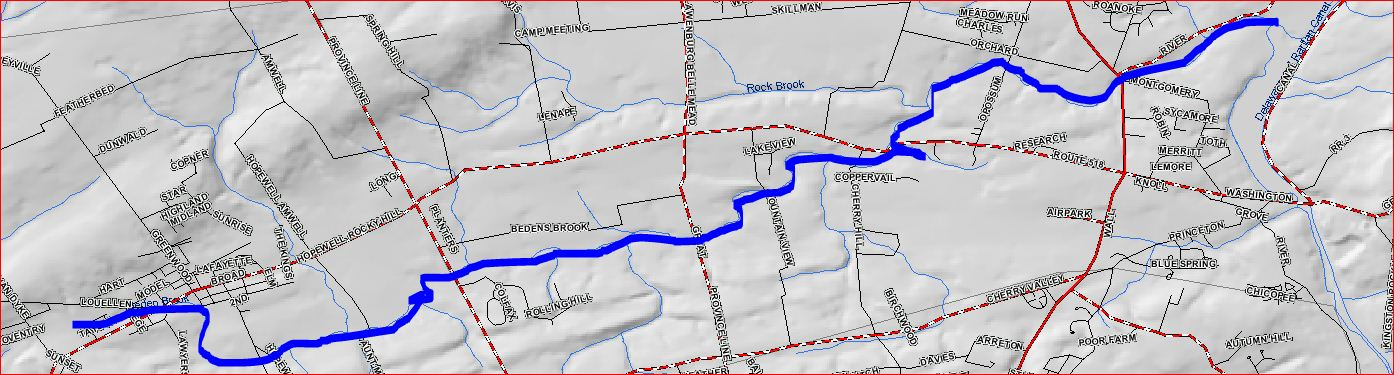
- Map of Beden Brook

Location
- Country: United States

Physical characteristics
- Source
  - coordinates: 40°23′4″N 74°46′34″W
- Mouth
  - coordinates: 40°25′15″N 74°37′54″W
  - elevation: 39 ft (12 m)

Basin features
- Progression: Millstone River, Raritan River, Atlantic Ocean
- Tributaries
  - left: Rock Brook, Pike Run

Beden Brook, also Bedens Brook, Beden's Brook, or Beeden's Brook, is a tributary of the Millstone River in central New Jersey in the United States.

== Course ==
The headwaters of the brook are variously given. The more southerly branch of the stream (the official USGS source at 40°23′4″N 74°46′34″W) rises to the west of Hopewell, flowing east, turning south below Hopewell, and then east again to meet the more northerly branch (sourced at 40°24′57″N 74°46′18″W). This rises on the southern slopes of Sourland Mountain, cutting a valley that defines the west side of Pheasant Hill. It flows south to the junction of the two headwater branches at 40°23′2″N 74°44′36″W. The combined streams then flow eastward, passing through the Bedens Brook Club and Cherry Valley Country Club to the south of Blawenburg. Past Blawenburg, the twisting brook turns to the northeast, and Cherry Run enters from the south. The brook passes under the Georgetown and Franklin Turnpike (CR-518) and receives Rock Brook on the grounds of the former North Princeton Developmental Center. Turning eastward again, the brook passes under U.S. Route 206 and receives Pike Run before emptying into the Millstone River.

== Tributaries ==
- Pike Run
  - Pine Tree Run
  - Back Brook
  - Cruser Brook
- Rock Brook
  - Cat Tail Brook
- Cherry Run (not on USGS GNIS)

== Sister tributaries ==
- Bear Brook
- Cranbury Brook
- Devils Brook
- Harrys Brook
- Heathcote Brook
- Indian Run Brook
- Little Bear Brook
- Millstone Brook
- Peace Brook
- Rocky Brook
- Royce Brook
- Simonson Brook
- Six Mile Run
- Stony Brook
- Ten Mile Run
- Van Horn Brook

== See also ==
- List of rivers of New Jersey
- USGS Coordinates in Google Maps
