= Millstone River =

Tributary of the Raritan River in New Jersey, US

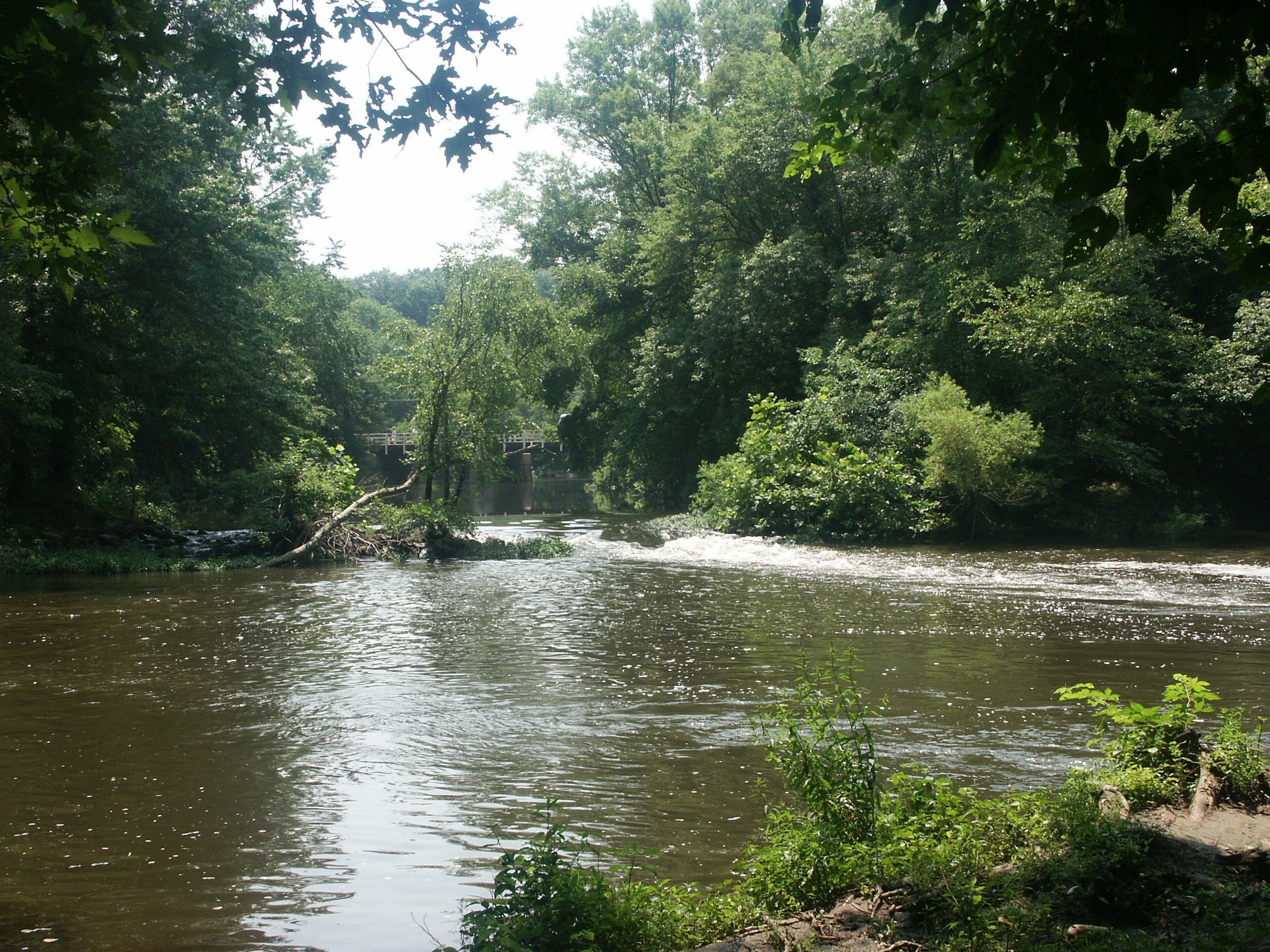
- Millstone River at Rocky Hill

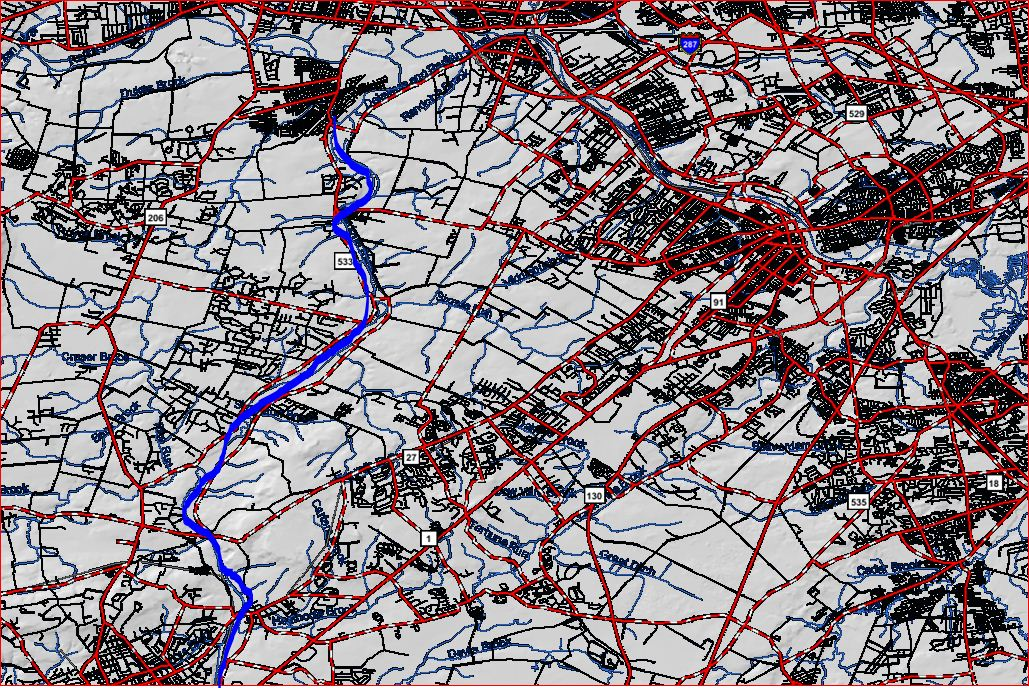
- Map of northern section of Millstone River; see below for map of southern section

Location
- Country: United States
- State: New Jersey
- Counties: Hunterdon, Mercer, Middlesex Monmouth, Somerset

Physical characteristics
- Source
  - coordinates: 40°11′58″N 74°24′48″W
- Mouth
  - coordinates: 40°32′33″N 74°34′0″W
  - elevation: 20 ft (6.1 m)
- Length: 38.6 mi (62.1 km)

Basin features
- Progression: Raritan River, Atlantic Ocean
- River system: Raritan River system
- Tributaries
  - left: Rocky Brook, Bear Brook, Stony Brook, Harrys Brook, Beden Brook, Royce Brook
  - right: Cranbury Brook, Devils Brook, Heathcote Brook, Simonson Brook, Ten Mile Run, Six Mile Run

The Millstone River is a 38.6-mile-long (62.1 km) tributary of the Raritan River in central New Jersey in the United States.

The Millstone River begins in western Monmouth County and flows westward through northern Mercer County / southern Middlesex County, and northward through southern Somerset County, before draining into the Raritan River at Manville. Almost three quarters of its length is paralleled by the Delaware and Raritan Canal. Both the Millstone River and parallel canal provide drinking water to large portions of central New Jersey and provide recreational uses as well.

Parts of the river demarks the border between Middlesex and Mercer Counties, which also forms the boundaries between the Second and Third Districts of the Federal Reserve.

== Course ==
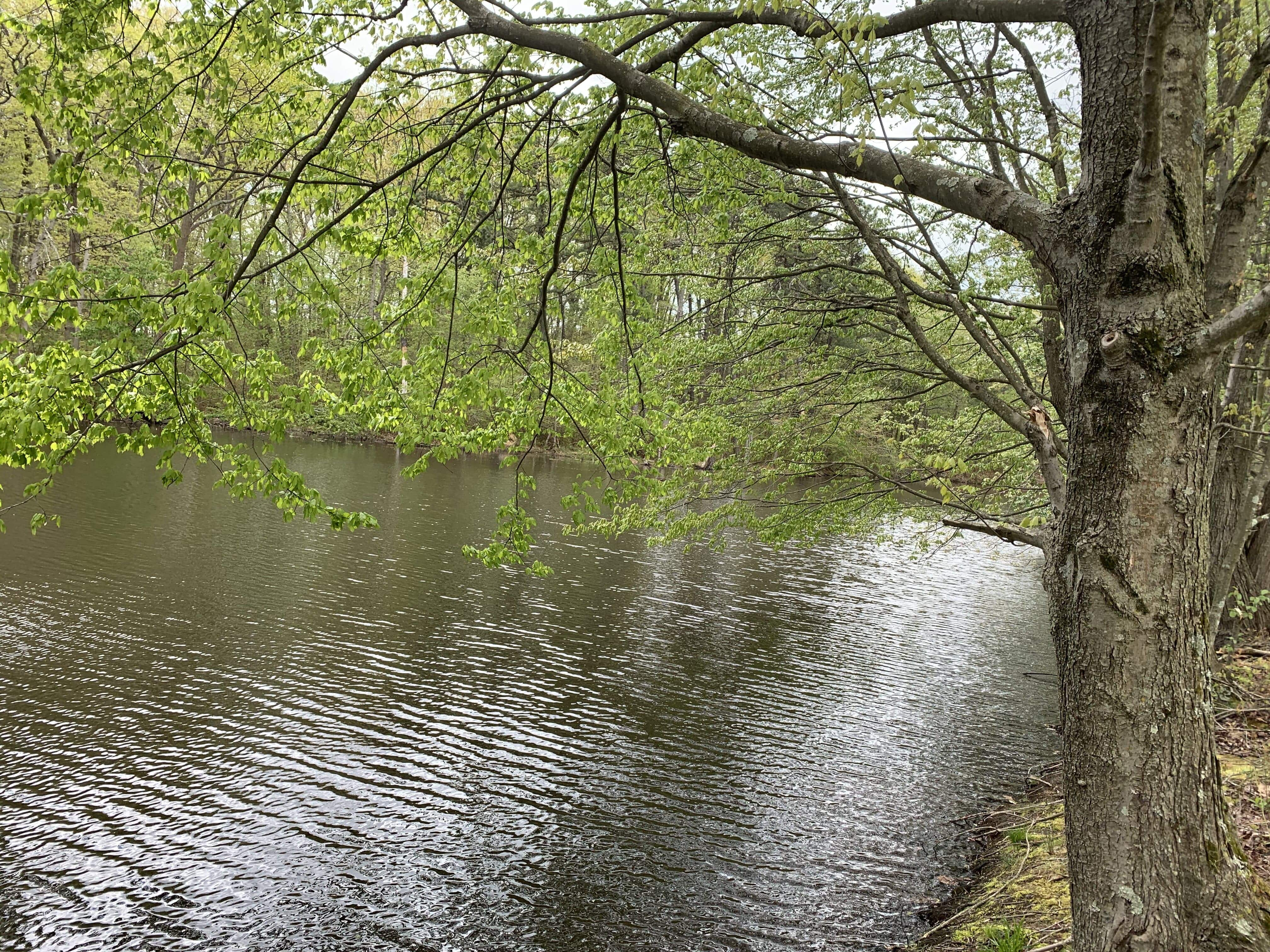
The Millstone River flowing in Millstone Township, where the headwaters for the river are located.

The Millstone River starts in western Monmouth County at 40°11′58″N 74°24′37″W, near CR-524 (Stage Coach Road). It flows northeast and turns north before picking up a tributary and crossing CR-1, Sweetmans Lane. It then crosses Baird Road before crossing SR-33 and flowing past the watershed of the Cranbury Brook.

It turns west, crossing Perrineville Road and Applegarth Road. Meanwhile, it receives many small tributaries. It crosses the New Jersey Turnpike, before flowing through the East Windsor Open Space Acquisition. It then crosses CR-639 and Route 130 before picking up a tributary and flowing into Fischer Acres Associates. It crosses Old Cranbury Road and turns southwest before receiving Rocky Brook and making a turn to the northwest.

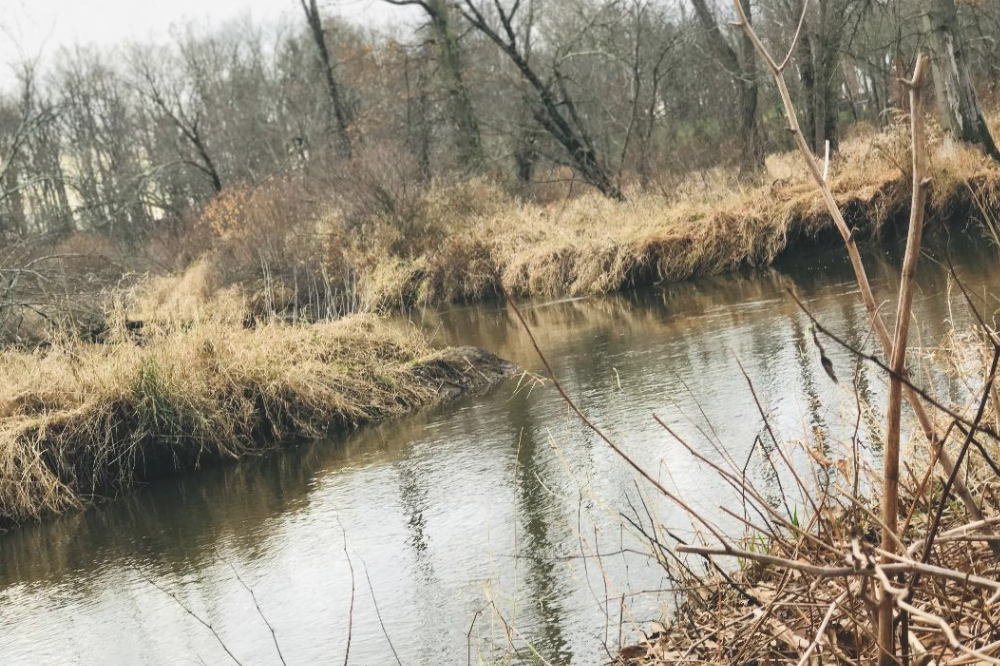
The Millstone River flowing in Plainsboro Township.

It then turns west and crosses Old Trenton Road, John White Road, and Southfield Road before flowing alongside the West Windsor Planning Incentive and crossing Cranbury Road. It receives Cranbury Brook and Bear Brook before receiving Devils Brook and crossing US-1 (Brunswick Pike). It then flows into Carnegie Lake and crosses the D&R Canal, which it closely parallels the rest of its downstream journey.

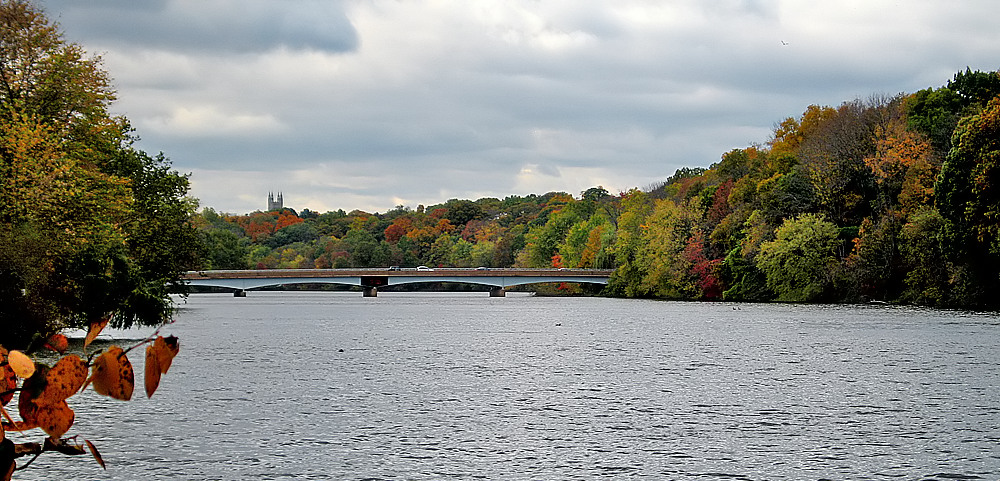
Carnegie Lake, with Princeton University's Cleveland Tower in the background.

It turns northeast, receiving Stony Brook from the southwest before turning north again. It receives Harrys Brook and exits the Carnegie Lake. It then enters the D&R Canal State Park before crossing NJ27. It receives Beden Brook before crossing the Griggstown Causeway and receiving the Simonson Brook directly afterward. By the time it receives Beden Brook, it is paralleled by CR-533, River Road.

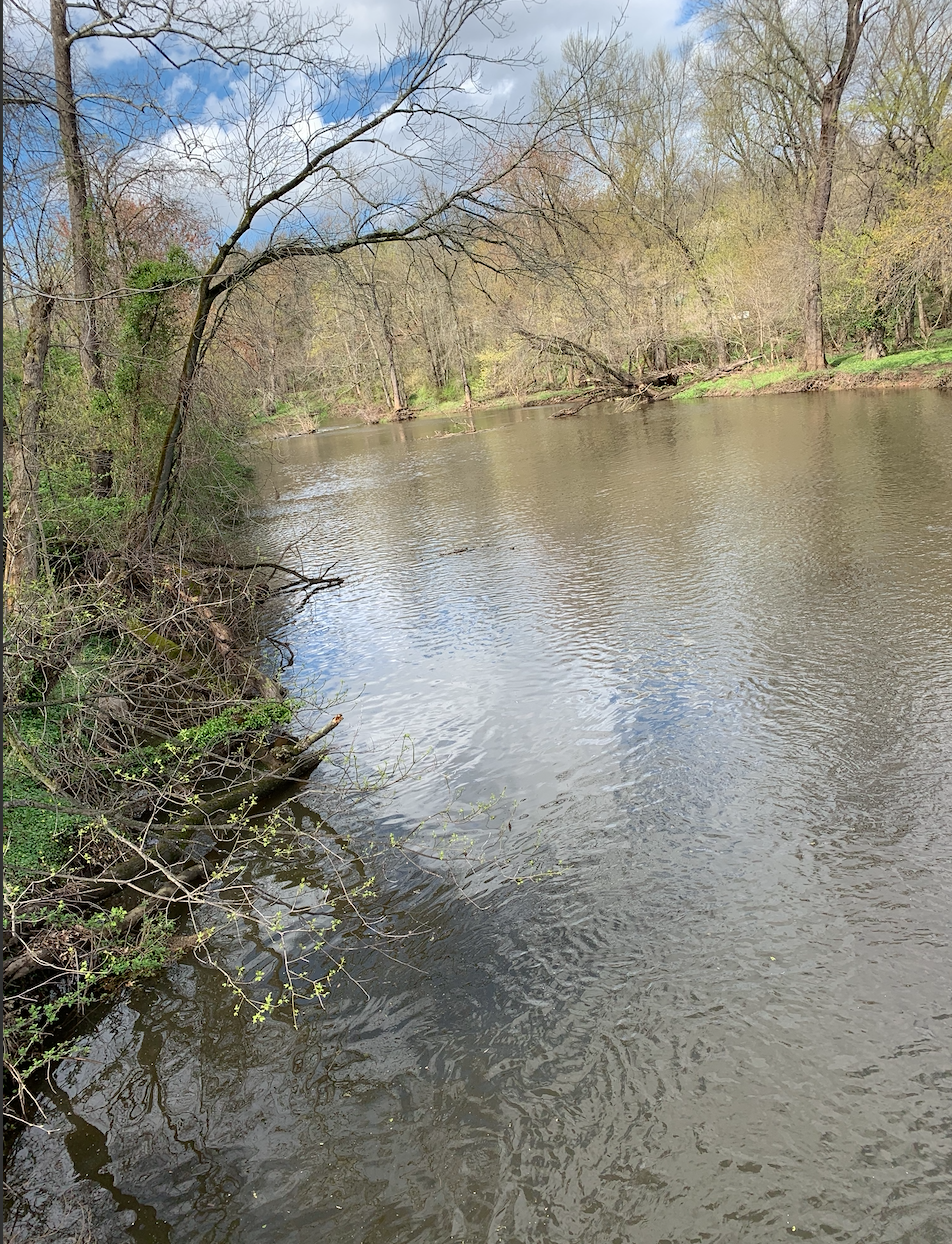
The Millstone River flowing in Rocky Hill.

It then receives the Ten Mile Run and Six Mile Run before crossing Blackwells Mills Road. It receives a tributary from Colonial Park and crosses Weston Causeway. It receives Royce Brook before flowing past the Somerset Christian College, one of the few structures built on the land between the D&R Canal and the Millstone River. By the time it crosses Royce Brook, CR-533 has separated from it and turned into Manville. It joins the Raritan River at 40°32′33″N 74°34′0″W.

== Flooding ==
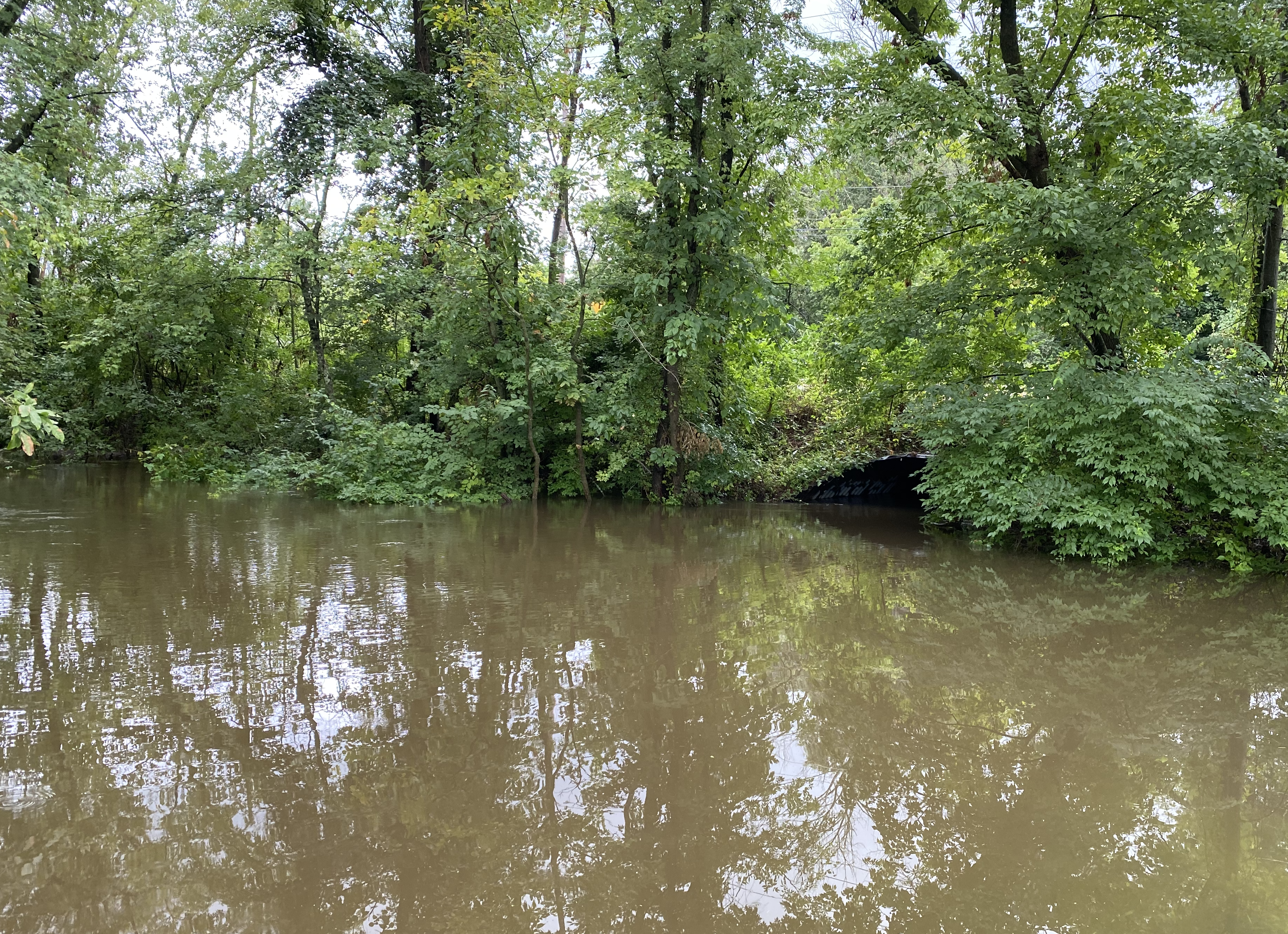
During Hurricane Henri, the Millstone River overflowed and nearly submerged a nearby pedestrian tunnel in the D&R Canal State Park near Kingston.

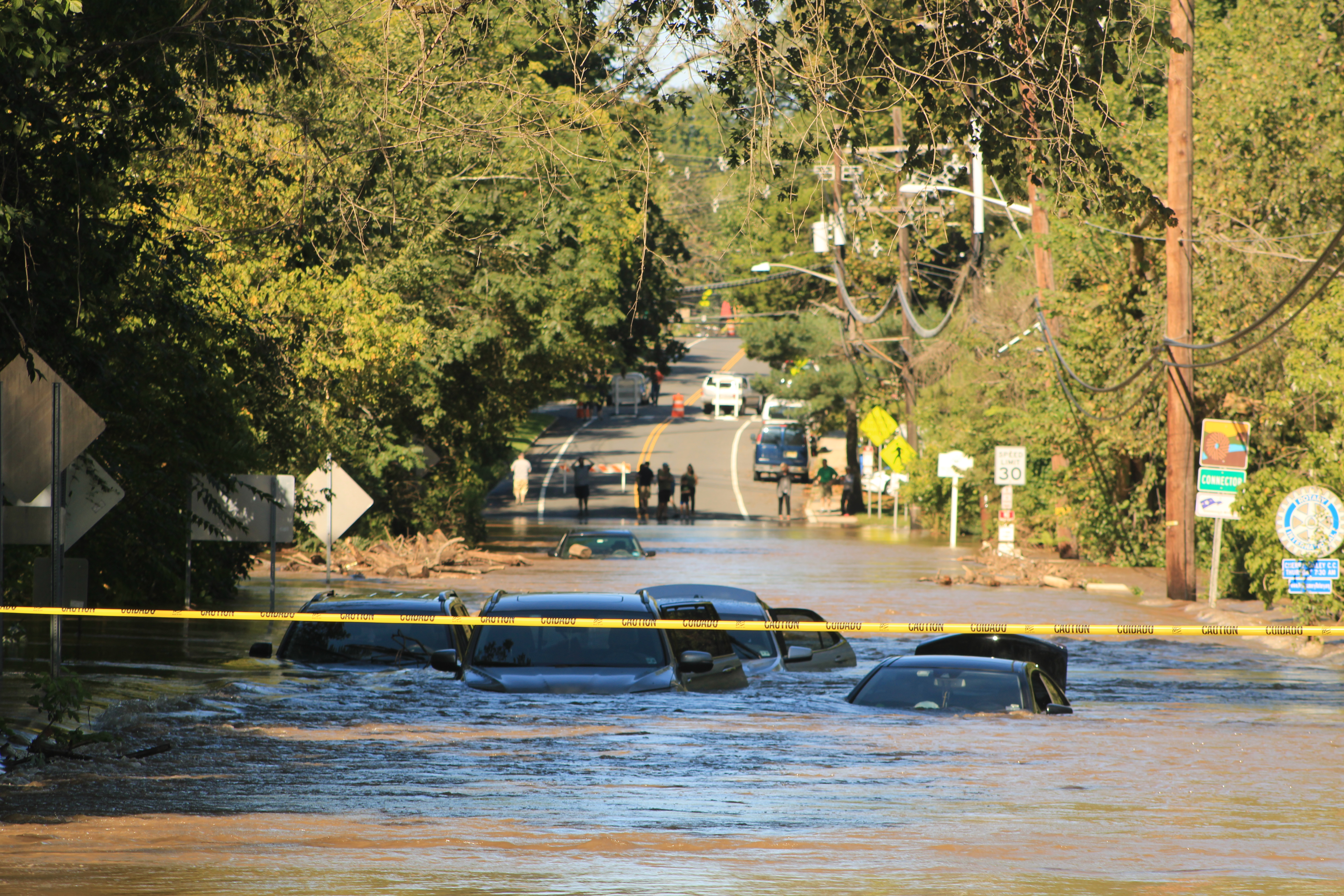
During Hurricane Ida, the Millstone River, and much of the Raritan Basin at large, suffered from massive flooding. Pictured here, is the Georgetown Franklin Turnpike bridge connecting Rocky Hill and Franklin Township overflowed by the Millstone River, with abandoned cars submerged in the floodwaters.

The Millstone River basin has suffered a number of severe flooding events over the past 200 years. Hurricane Floyd in September 1999 produced a particularly severe flood in the basin, especially in the Lost Valley section of Manville, which sits on a flood plain between the Millstone River and the Raritan River. Severe flooding once again occurred after Hurricane Irene swept through the area in 2011.

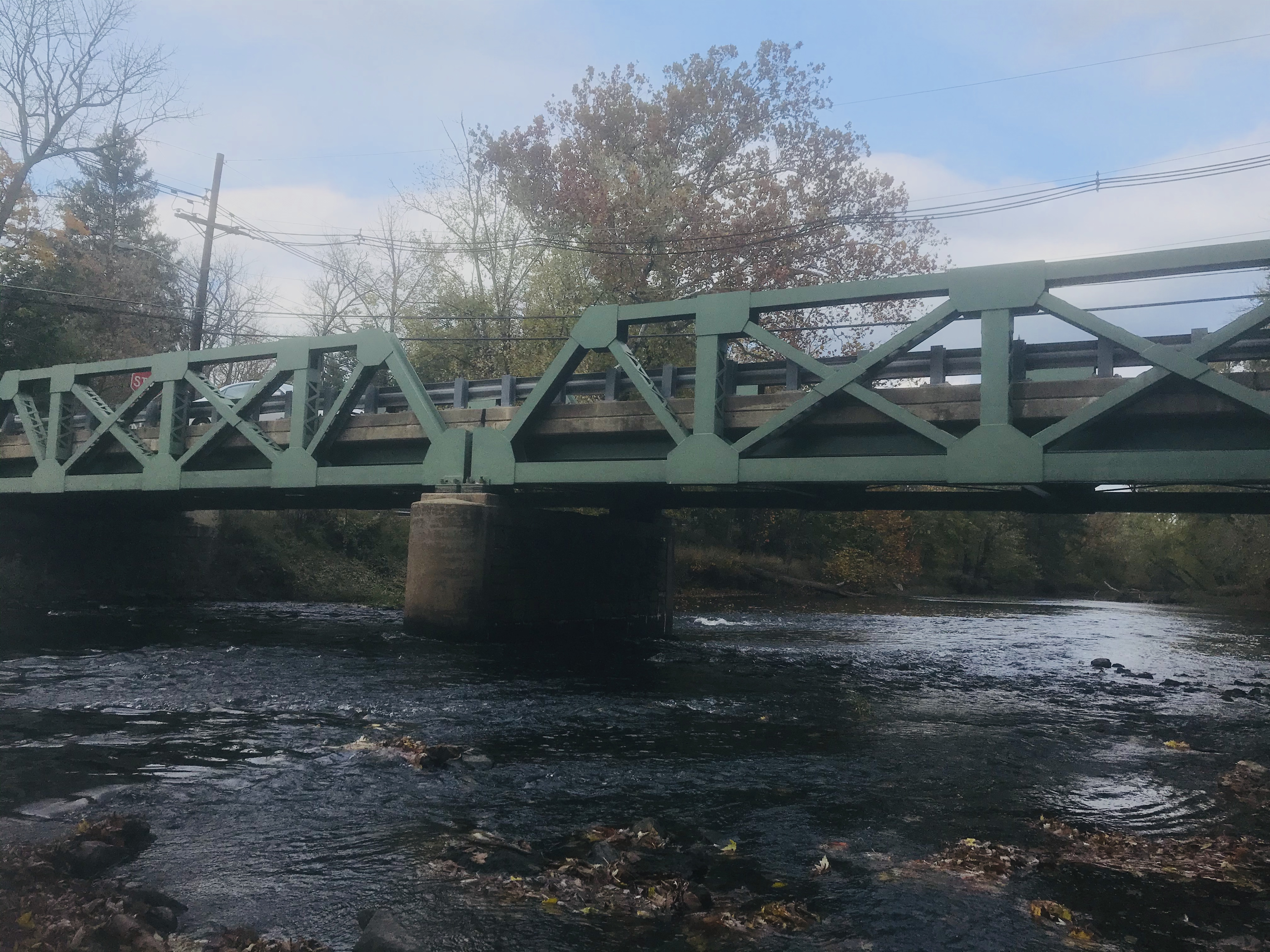
The Millstone River's northern course near Griggstown.

In 2016 the U.S. Army Corps of Engineers and New Jersey Department of Environmental Protection jointly conducted a flood risk management feasibility study on the Millstone River Basin to determine if flooding can be mitigated or controlled. The study focused on Manville, determined to be at highest risk from flooding, but concluded that none of the suggested improvements were economically feasible and therefore recommended no federal action to reduce flood risk.

== Water supply ==
The Millstone River provides drinking water to tens of thousands of households and businesses in Central New Jersey. A water intake pumping station is located where the Millstone River and Raritan River meet. The water is purified and distributed by the New Jersey American Water.

== Commercial history ==
In earliest colonial times as land routes began to supplant sea shipping, commerce between the emerging centers New York City and Philadelphia was carried by stage coach along a direct route from South Amboy to Bordentown. Much later that route became a railroad.

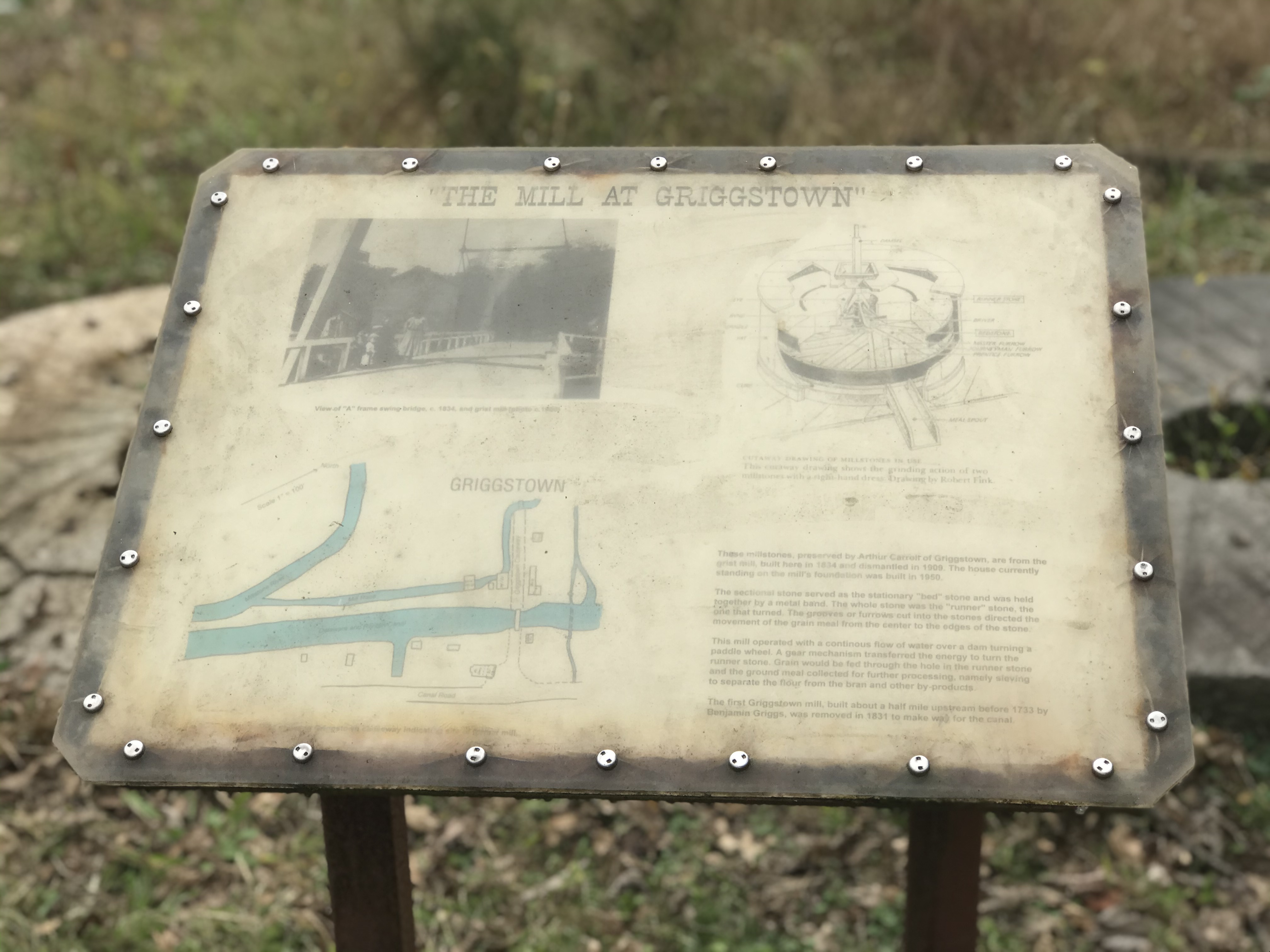
The Mill at Griggstown was one of several mills situated on the D&R Canal in its largely parallel stretch with the Millstone River up to New Brunswick.

A series of New Jersey towns still extant sprouted up along the stage coach route, including South Amboy, Sayreville, South River, Spotswood, Helmetta, Jamesburg, Cranbury, Hightstown, Windsor, Robbinsville, and Bordentown. In general, the stage coach took a bee-line route, straight as the crow flies, between the Raritan Bay at South Amboy and the Delaware River at Bordentown.

As the country grew and its economy began to thrive, large buoyant barges supported by water on canals emerged as much more suitable for heavy shipping. Unlike the stage coaches, however, routes for canals were obliged to follow the most level land — riverbeds. Hence the importance of the Millstone River which provides a north–south waterway through New Jersey connecting the two great cities of Philadelphia and New York.

The Millstone River is an important tributary of the Raritan River. The Raritan River empties into the Raritan Bay, a bay of the Atlantic Ocean. The Raritan Bay is contiguous to New York Harbor and separates the New York City Borough of Staten Island (Richmond County) from Central New Jersey along with the Arthur Kill a more narrow channel of water between Staten Island and New Jersey.

As the Raritan River flows eastward towards Raritan Bay, it joins the Millstone River flowing north in the vicinity of Bound Brook, New Jersey. The Millstone River traces an arc through several New Jersey Counties, originating in Monmouth County and flowing more-or-less west through Mercer County, then northwest through Somerset County, then northward towards Bound Brook.

== Delaware and Raritan Canal ==
The Delaware and Raritan Canal runs along east side of the Millstone River for much of its length, from Lake Carnegie near the border between West Windsor Township and Princeton to the location where the Millstone River empties into the main course of the Raritan River in Franklin Township.

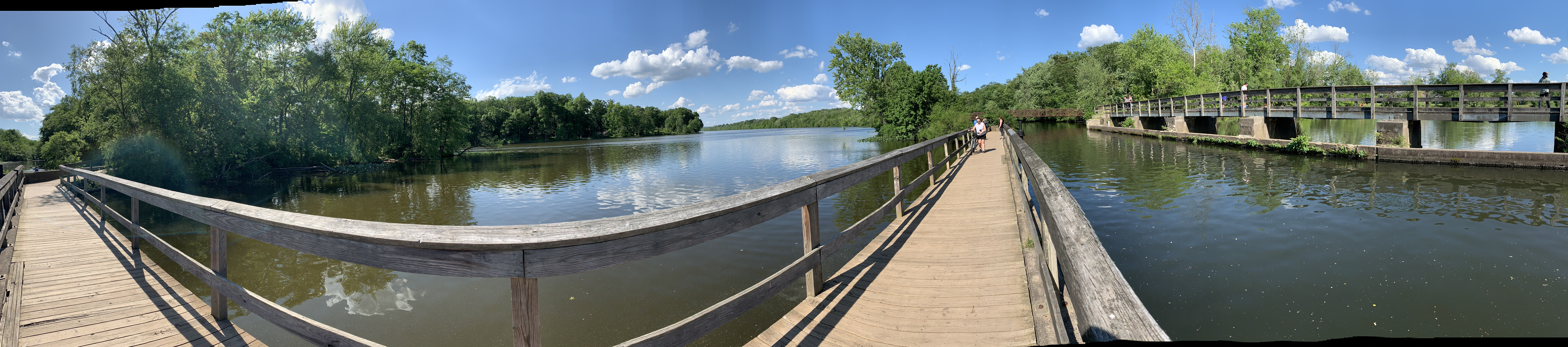
Panorama of the Millstone River as it crosses under the D&R Canal in West Windsor Township.

There the canal continues along the right (south) bank of the Raritan. The land between canal and river is a flood plain that generally consists of swamps, wooded areas and some farmland. A number of spillways allow water to run off from the canal into the Millstone River during periods of heavy water flow.

In Lawrenceville, New Jersey, at a site known as Bakers Basin today located along U.S. Route 1, the canal makes the few mile remaining connection into Trenton, the state capital, and then into the Delaware River.

Hence the Millstone and Raritan Rivers enabled the major shipping route between New York and Philadelphia in the early 19th century. From New York, of course, goods could be shipped north along the Hudson River and Erie Canal to upstate New York, and thence to Western Pennsylvania, Ohio, and other Great Lakes States upstream of Niagara Falls.

== Gallery ==
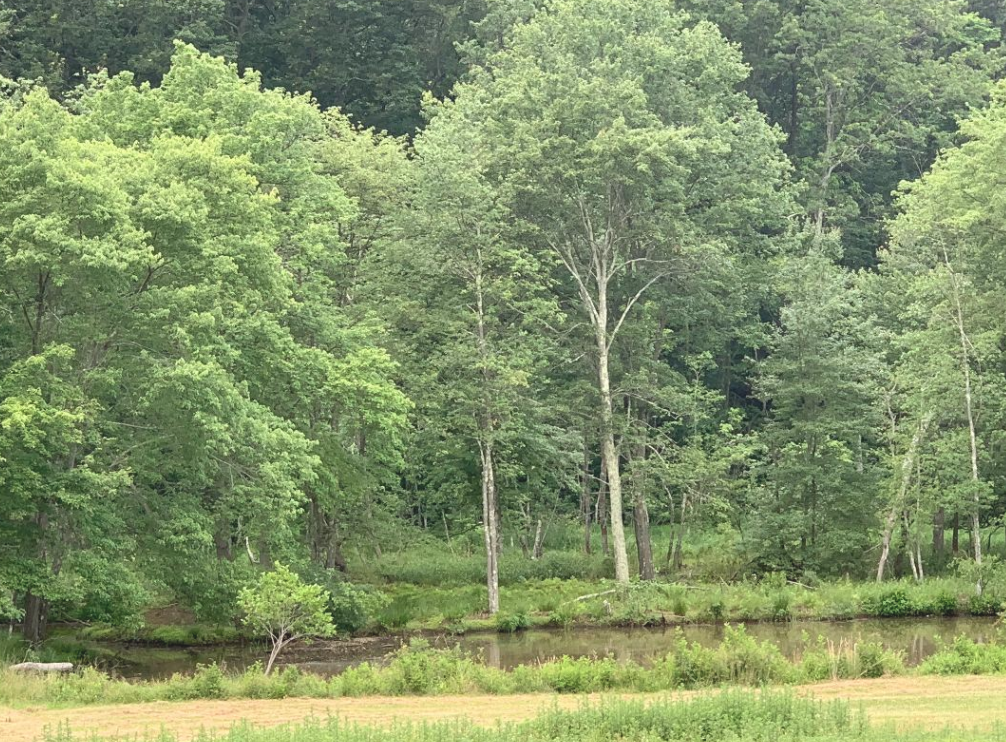
Millstone River flowing in Millstone Township (Monmouth County).

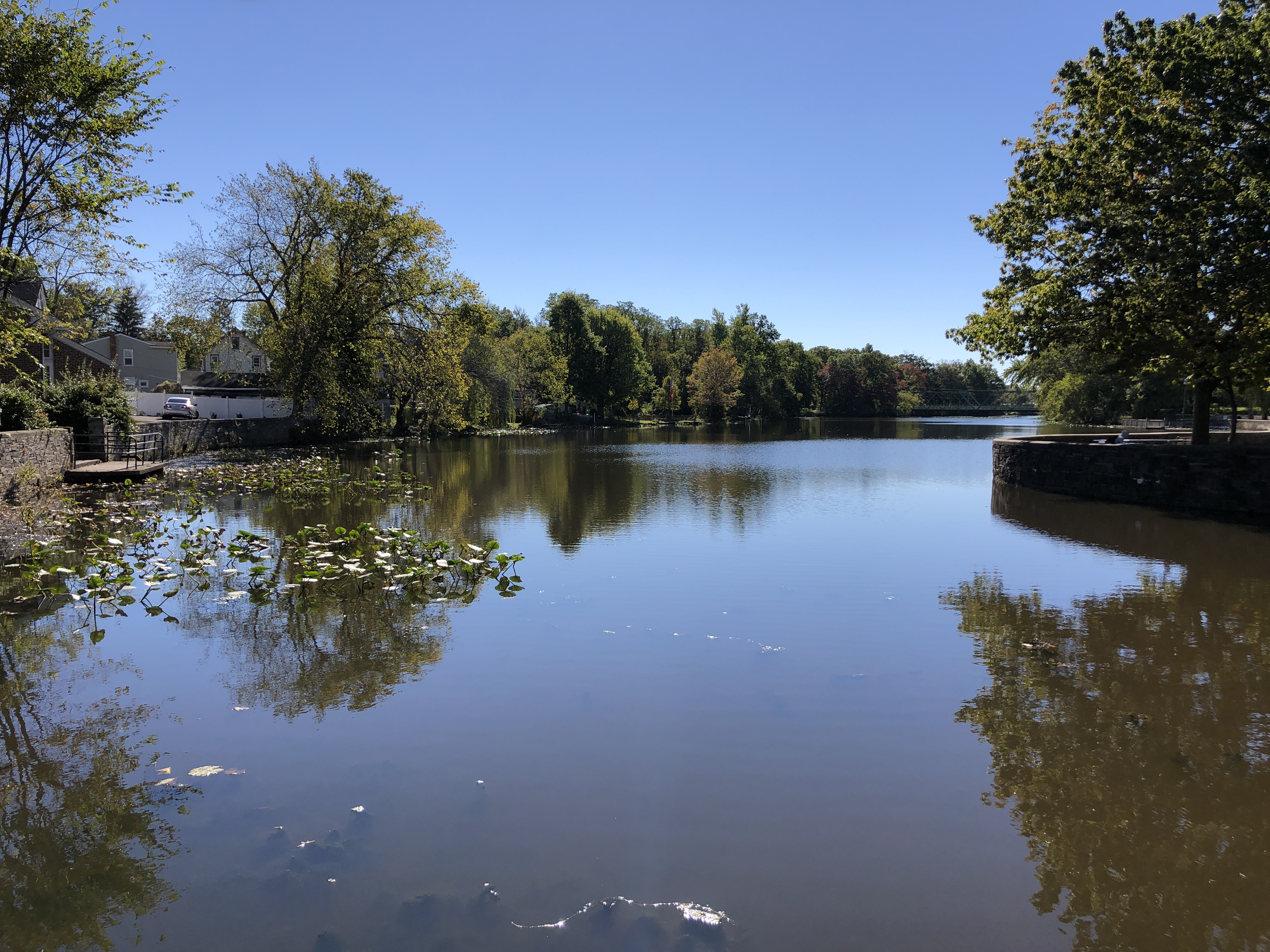
Peddie Lake in Hightstown (Mercer County).

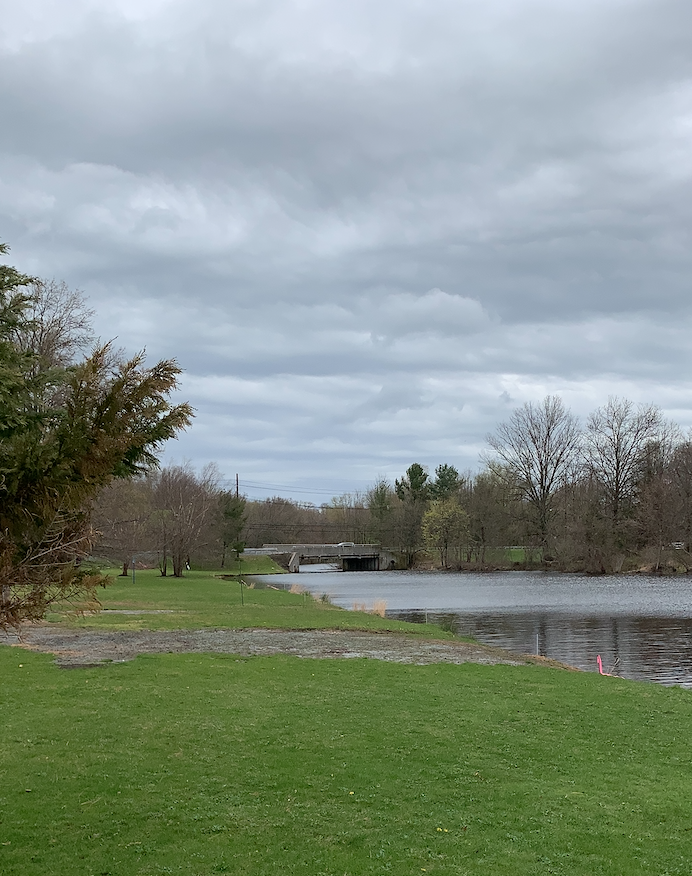
Gordon Pond, a dammed section of Devils Brook in Plainsboro Township (Middlesex County).

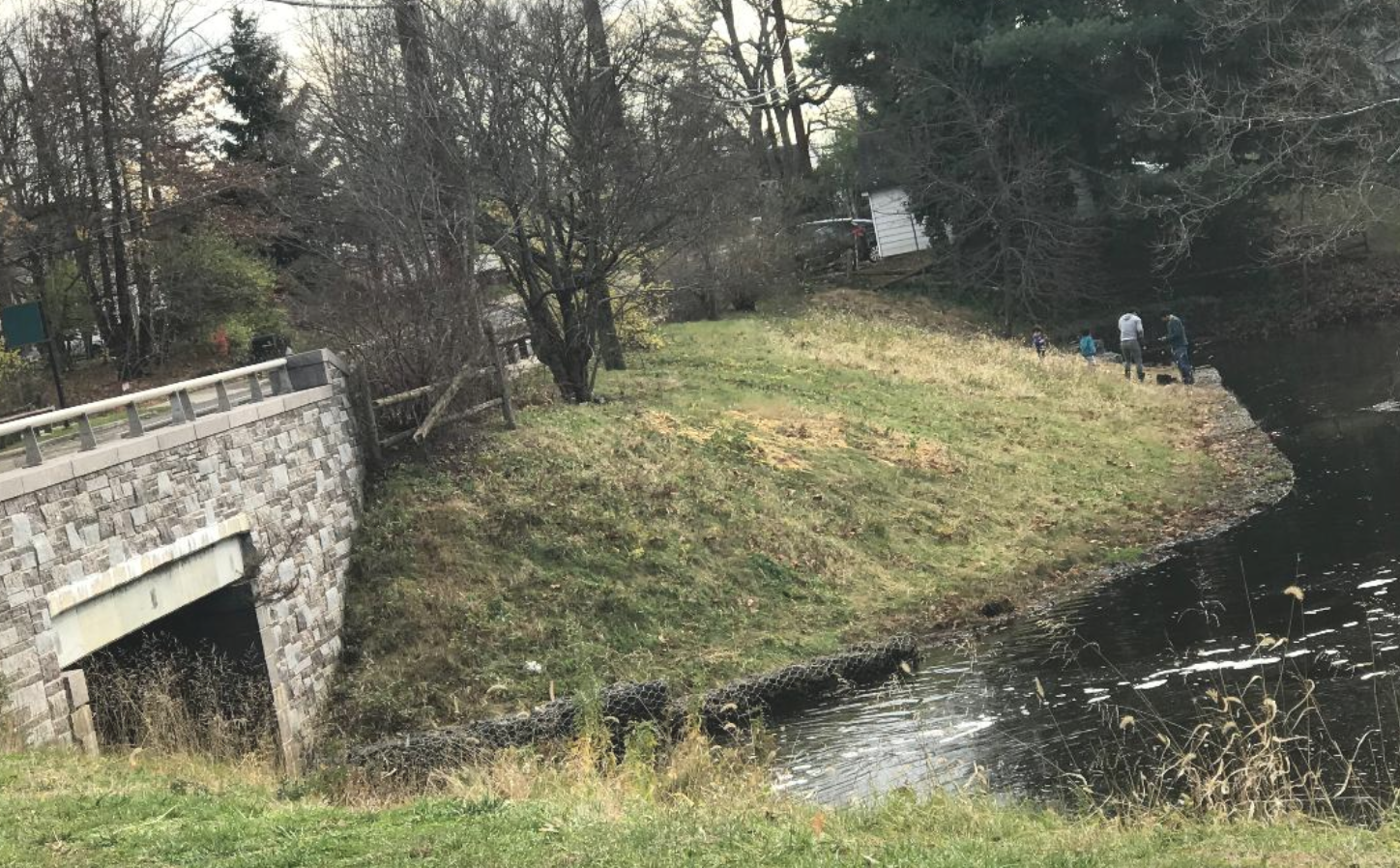
Family fishing on Devils Brook on Thanksgiving.

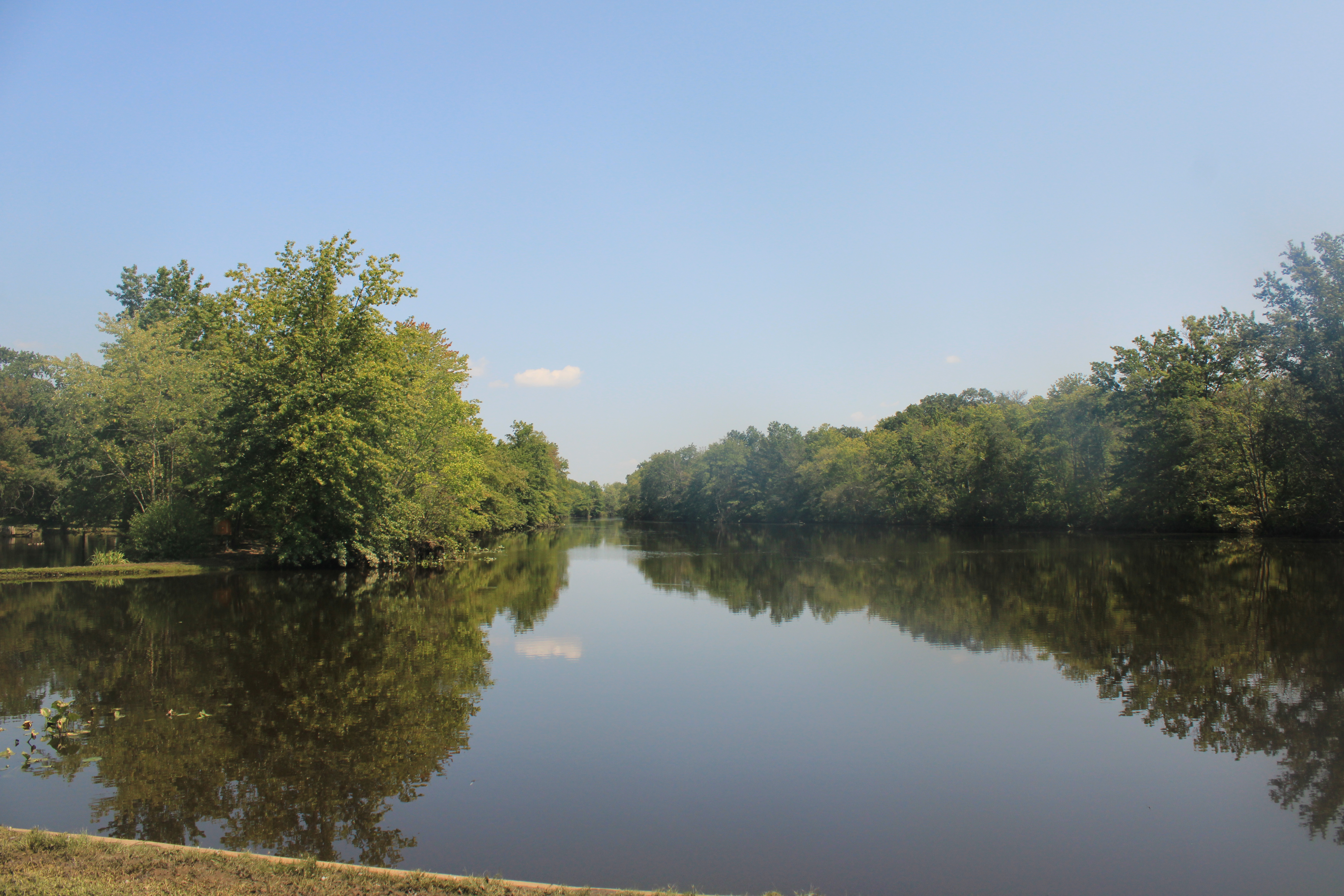
Mill Pond Park, a dammed lake of Devils Brook.

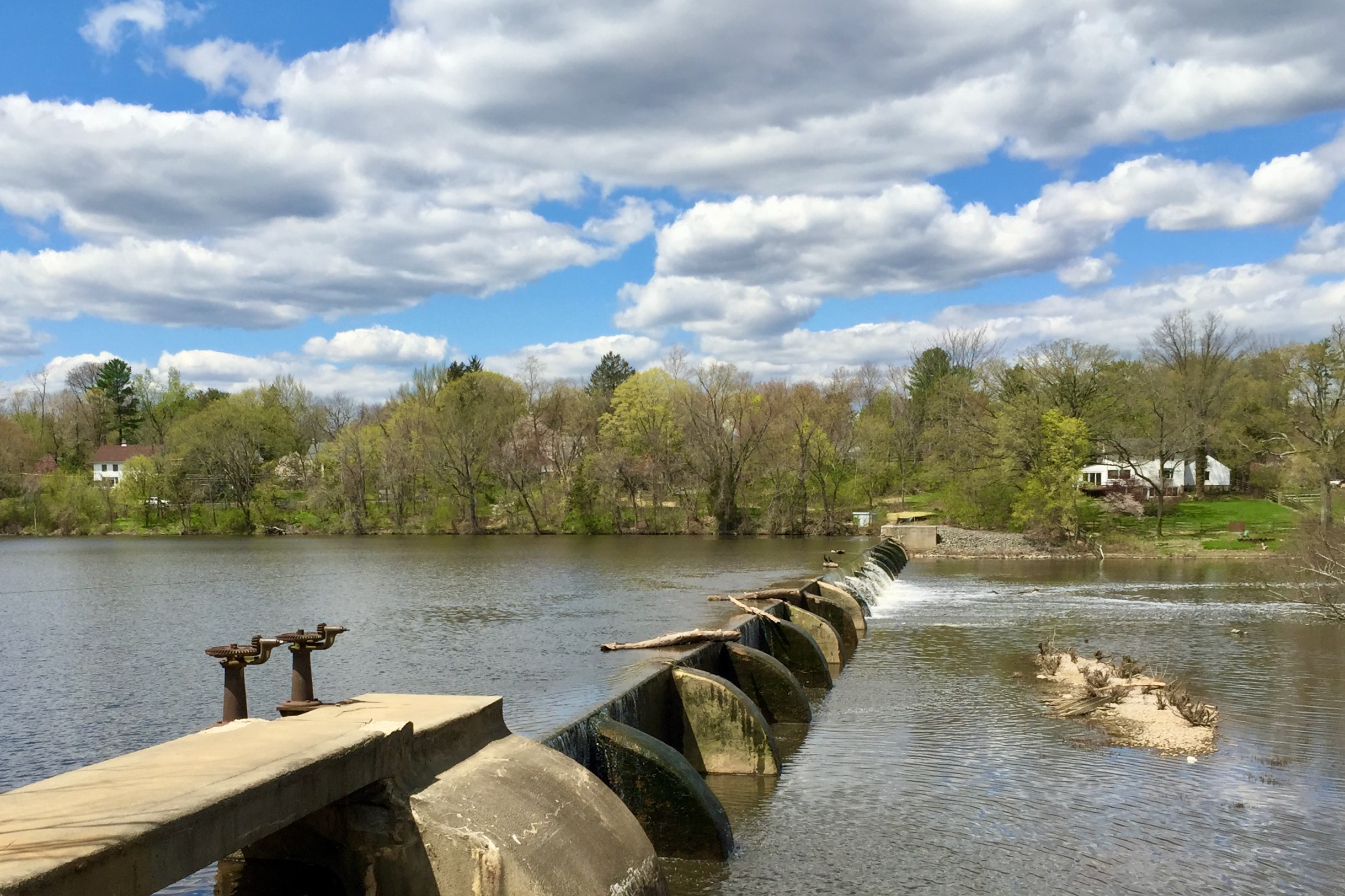
Dam forming Lake Carnegie in Princeton (Mercer County).

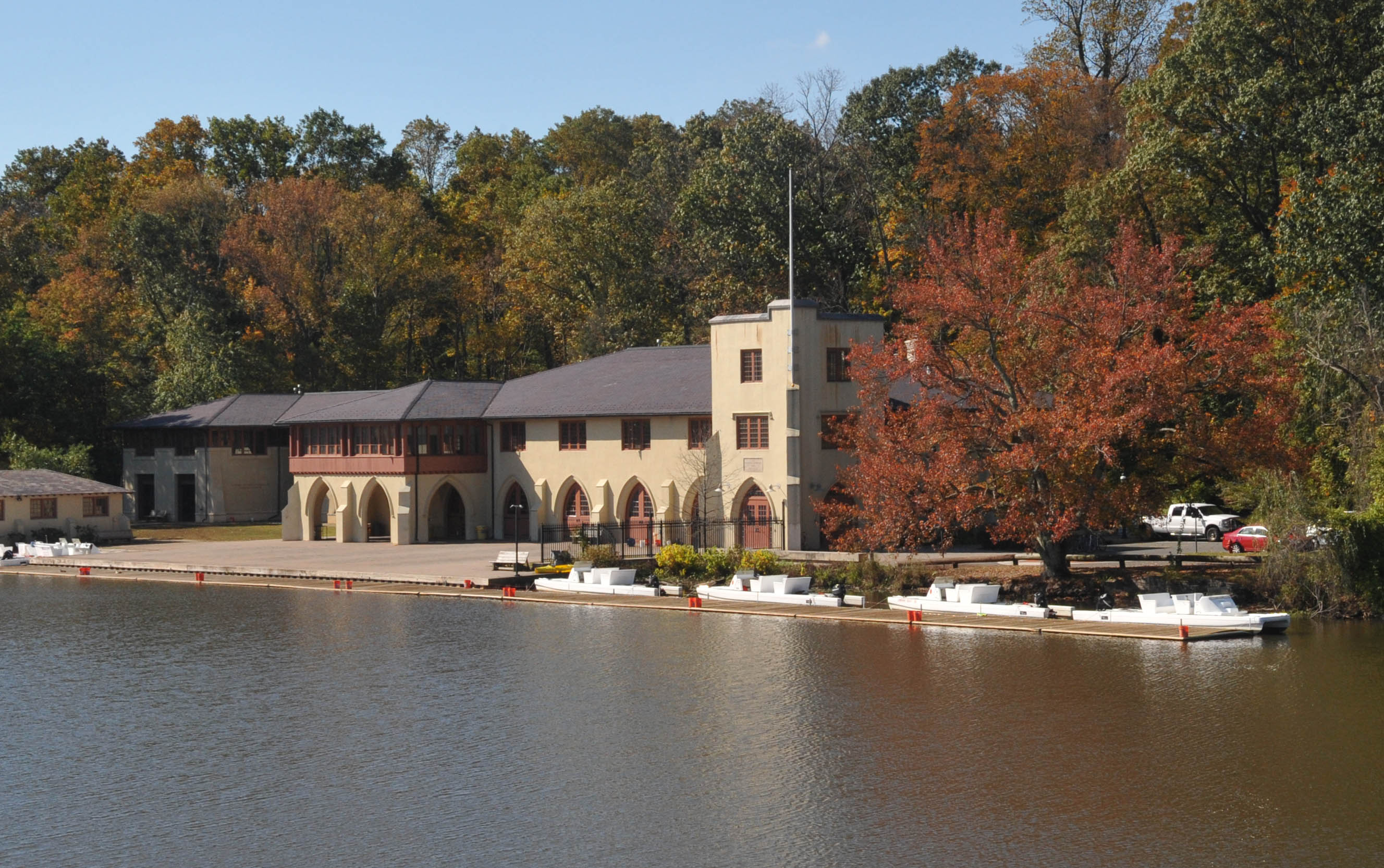
The boathouse, home to Princeton Rowing and the US Olympic rowing team.

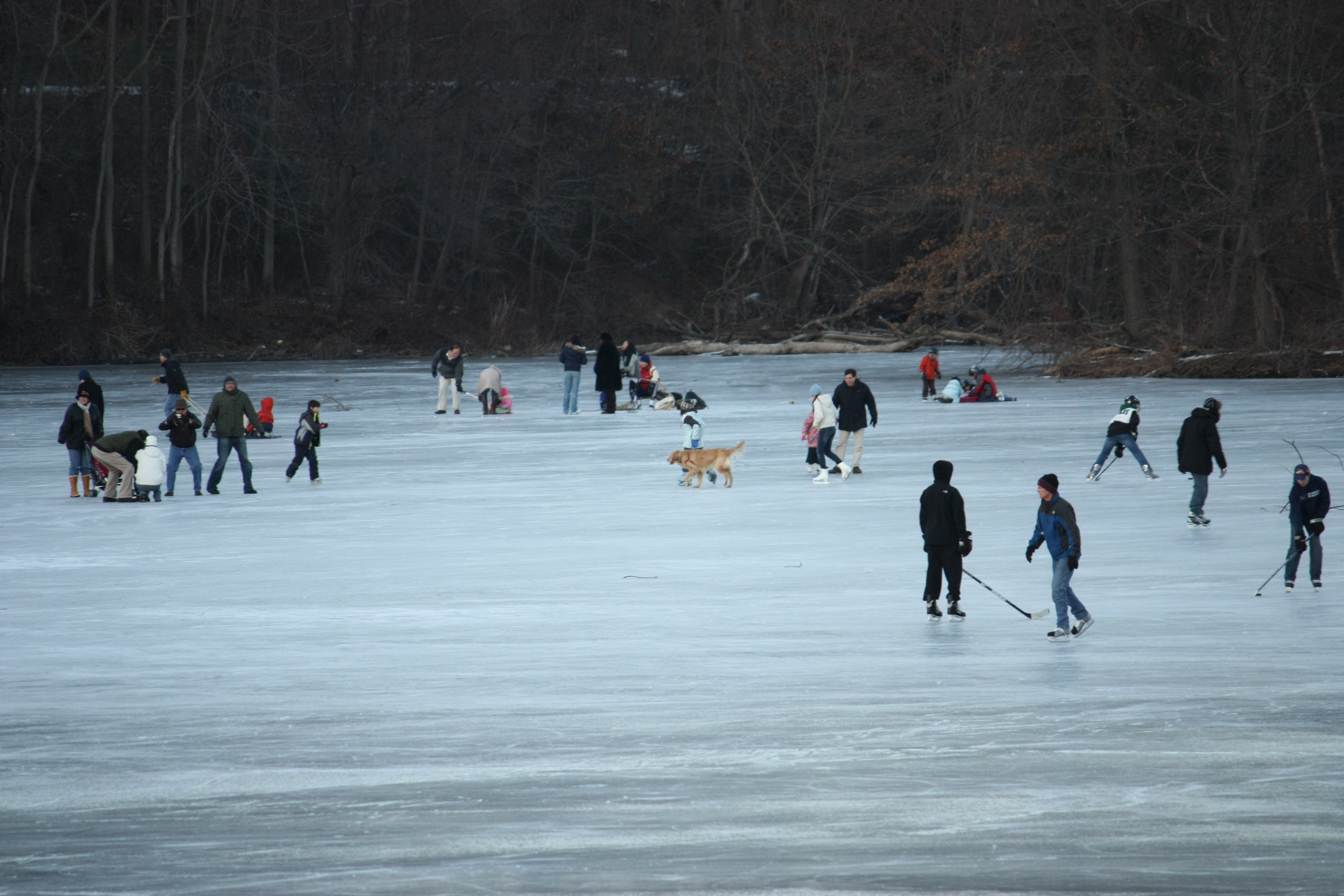
When the conditions are right, ice skating is a popular winter excursion for local residents to do on Lake Carnegie.

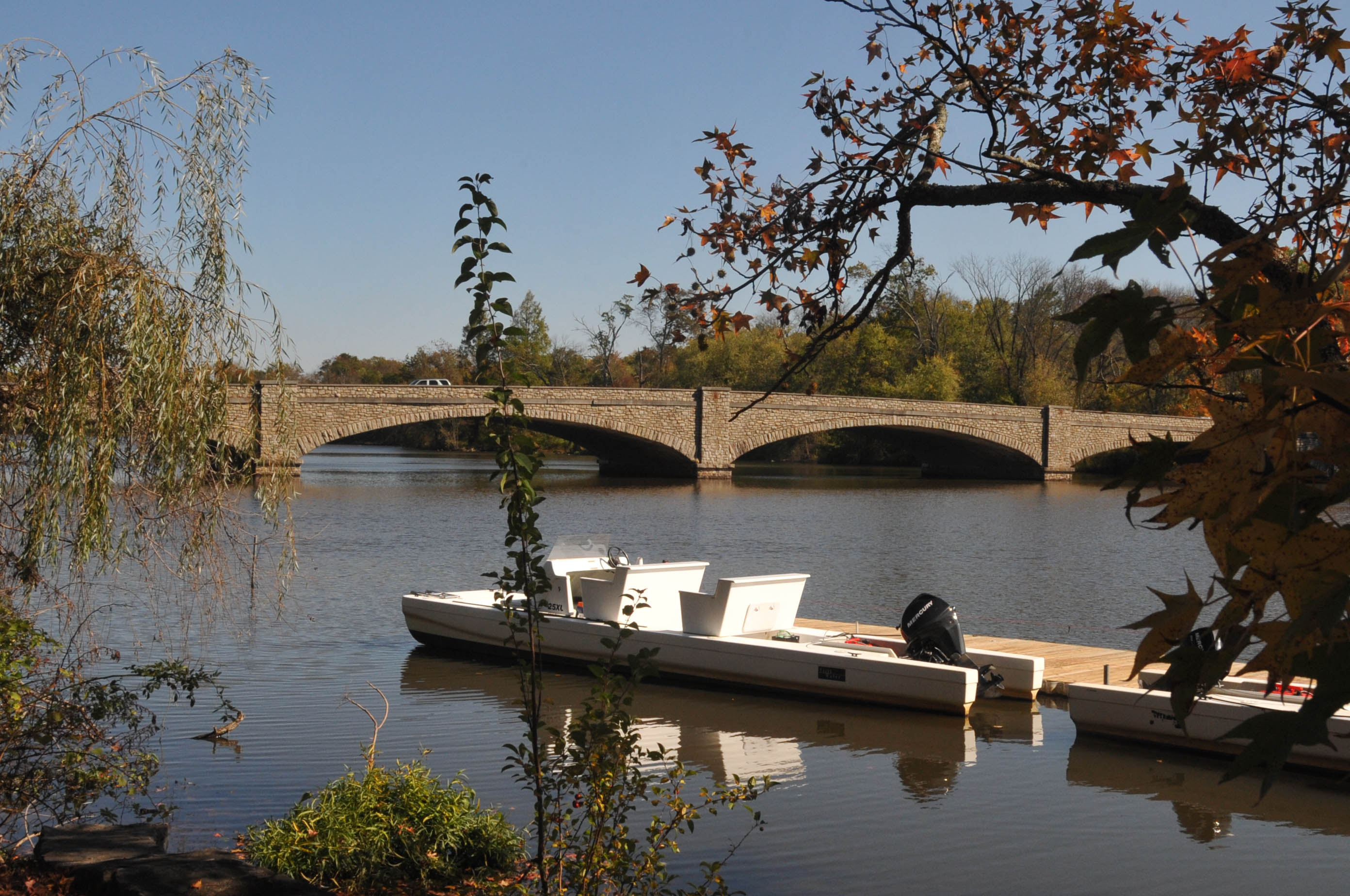
The Washington Road bridge crossing over the Millstone River and D&R Canal near Lake Carnegie.

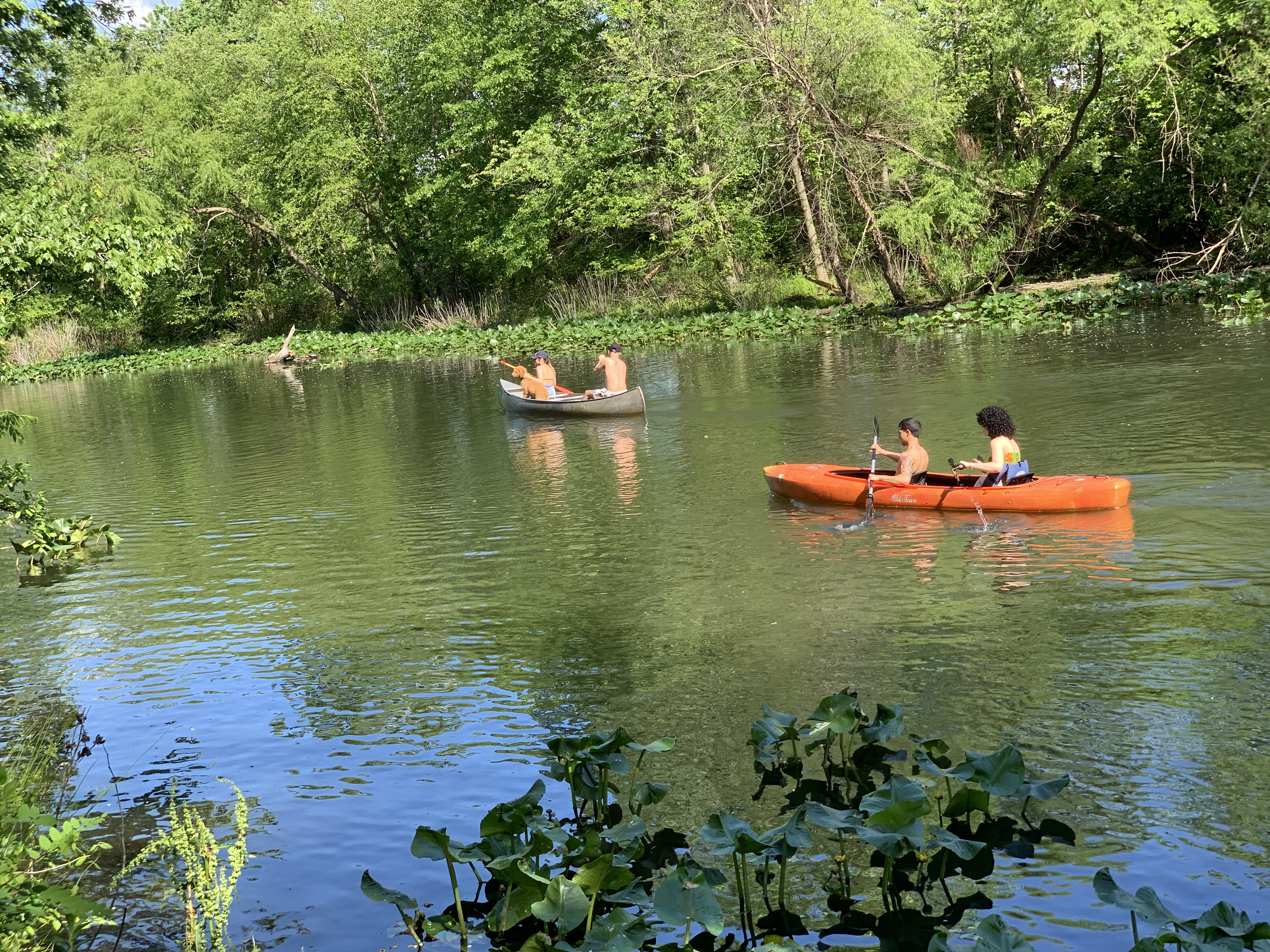
When the weather is right, the D&R Canal and its corresponding river attracts many rowers. Pictured in Princeton in summer 2020.

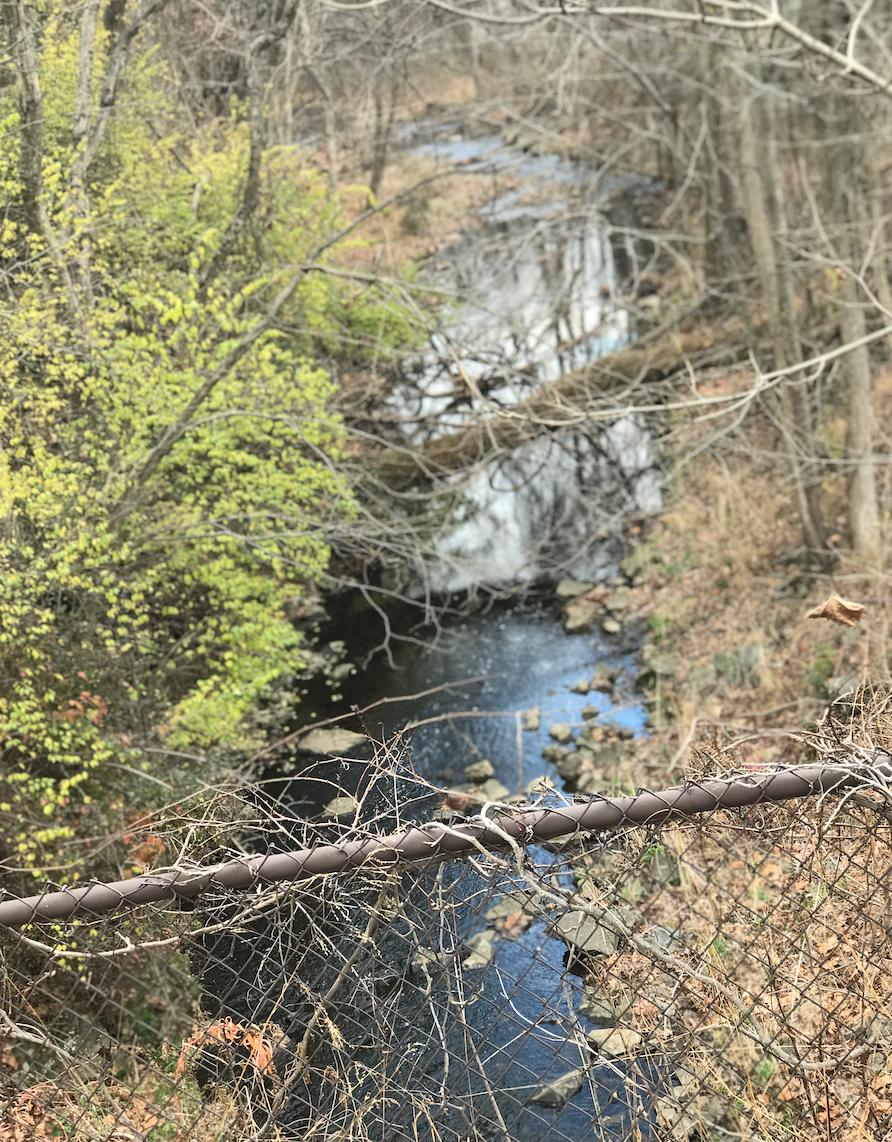
Brook flowing towards the main stem of the Millstone River in Rocky Hill (Somerset County).

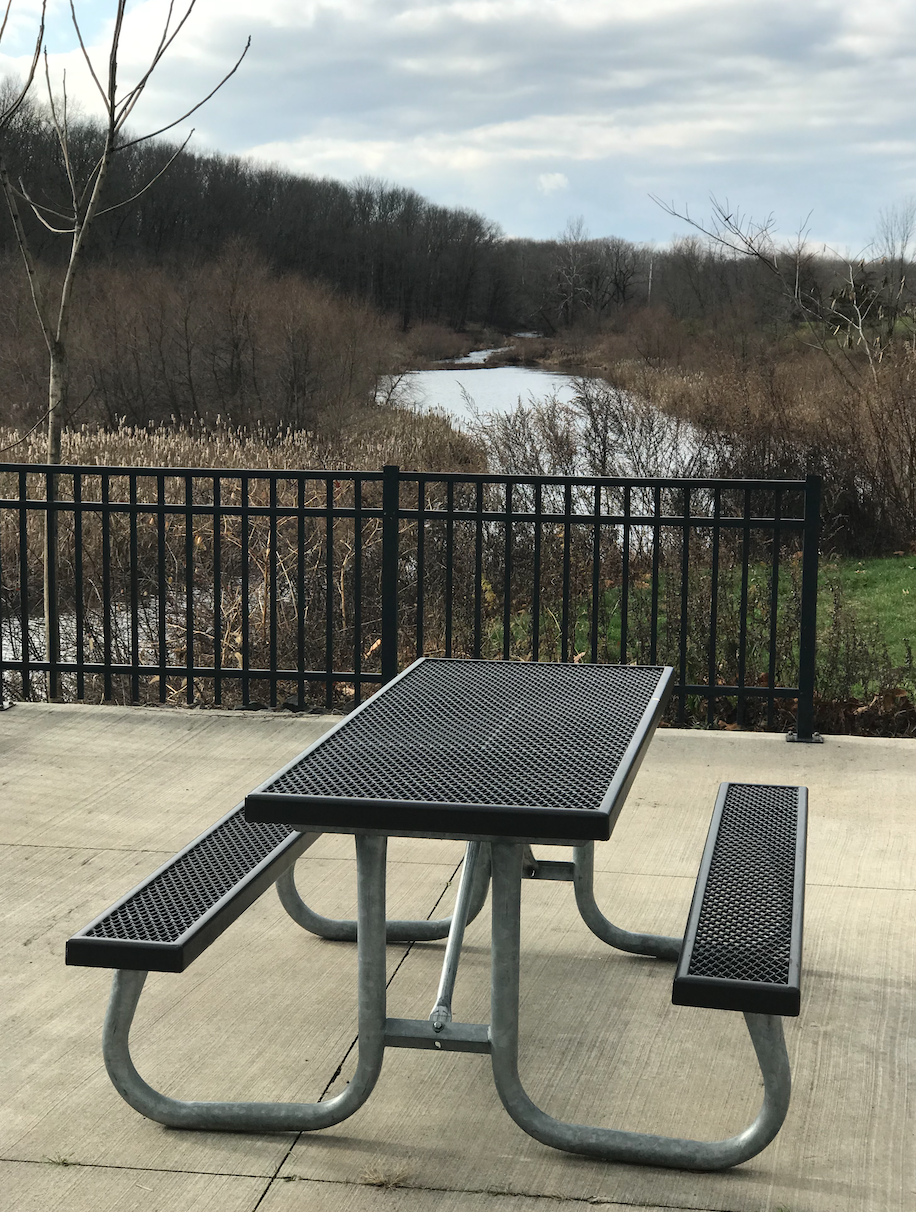
Sylvan Lake in Skillman Park in Skillman (Somerset County).

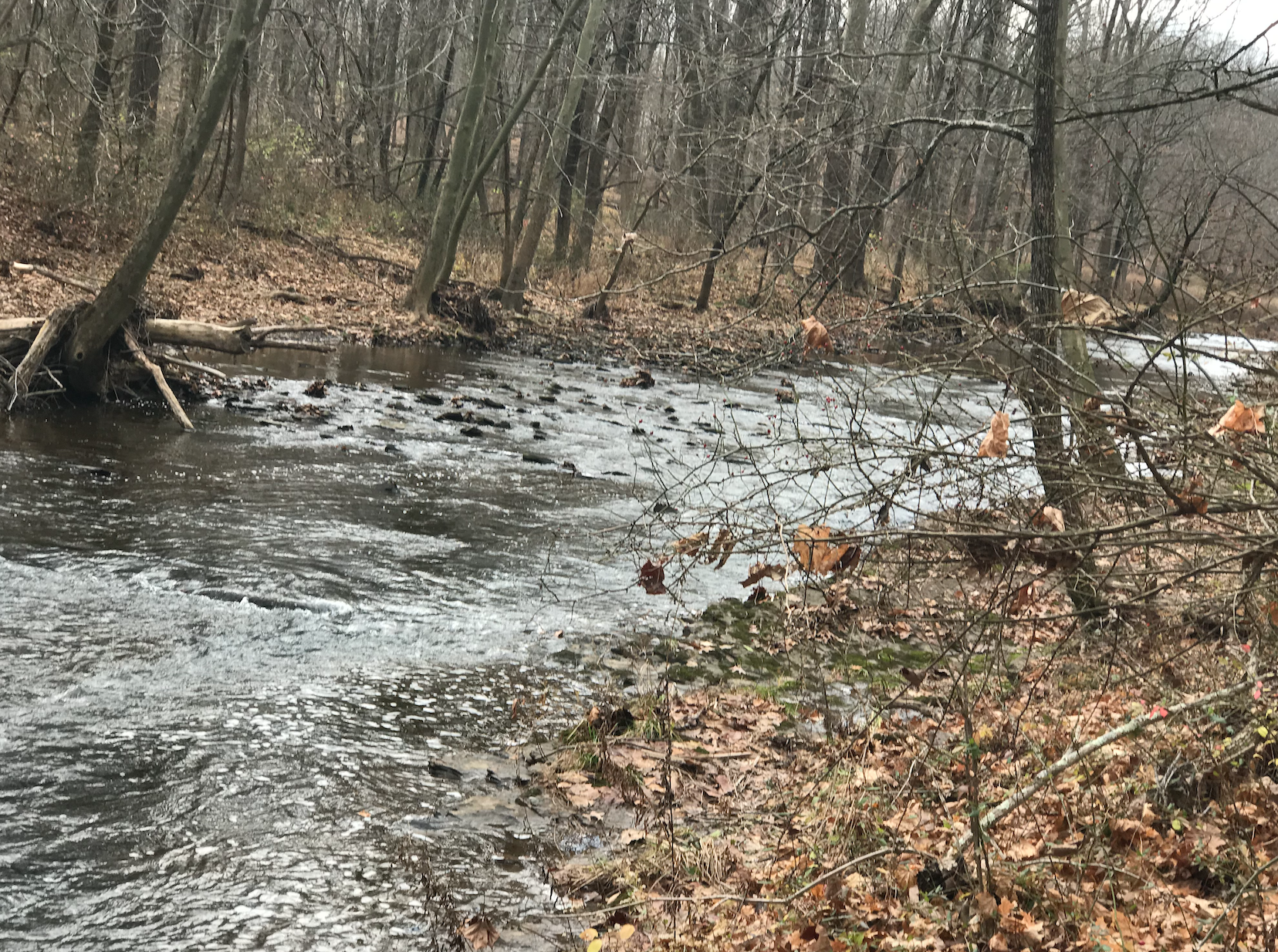
Rock Brook flowing through Skillman Park.

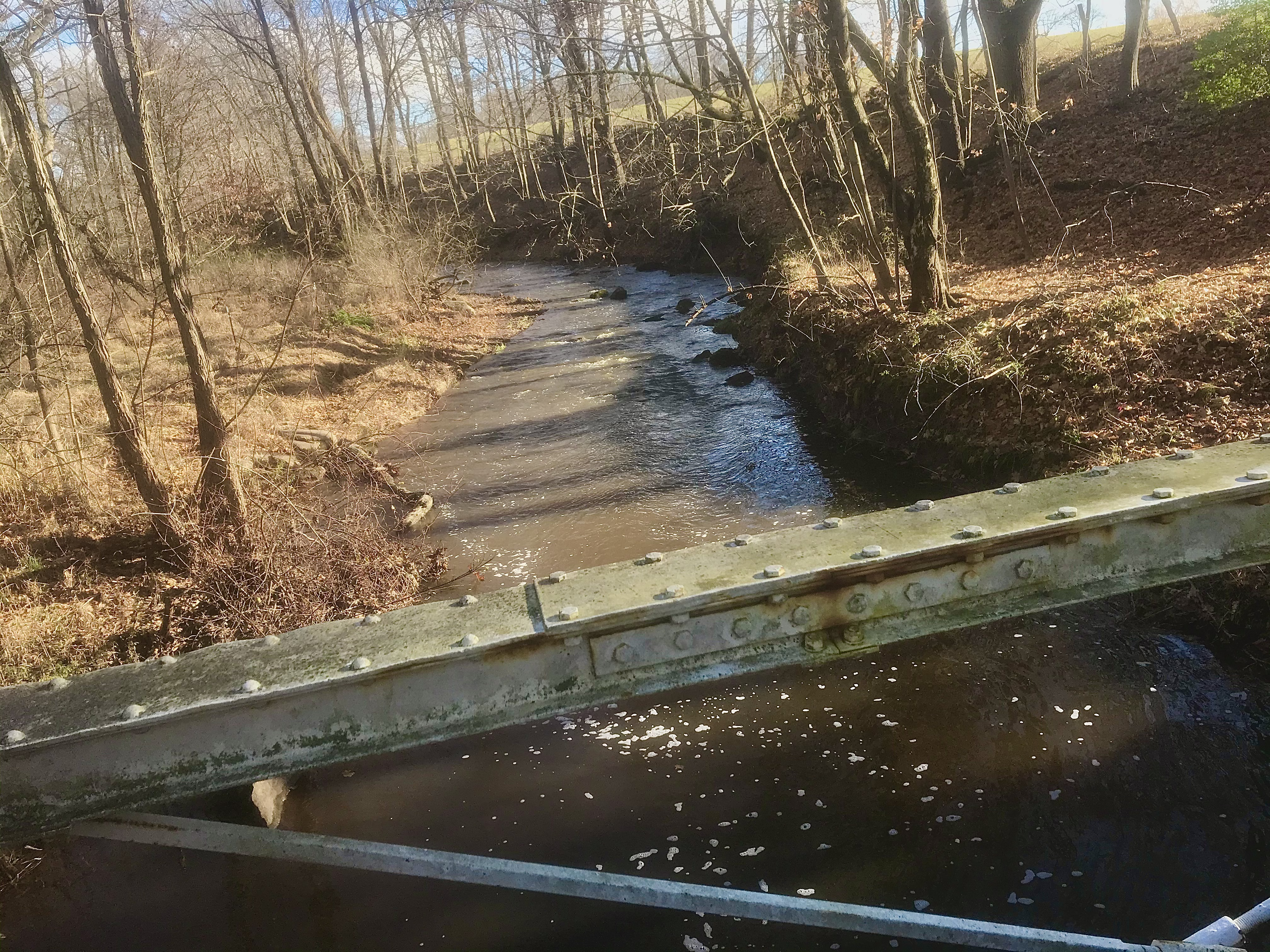
Ten Mile Run in Franklin Township (Somerset County).

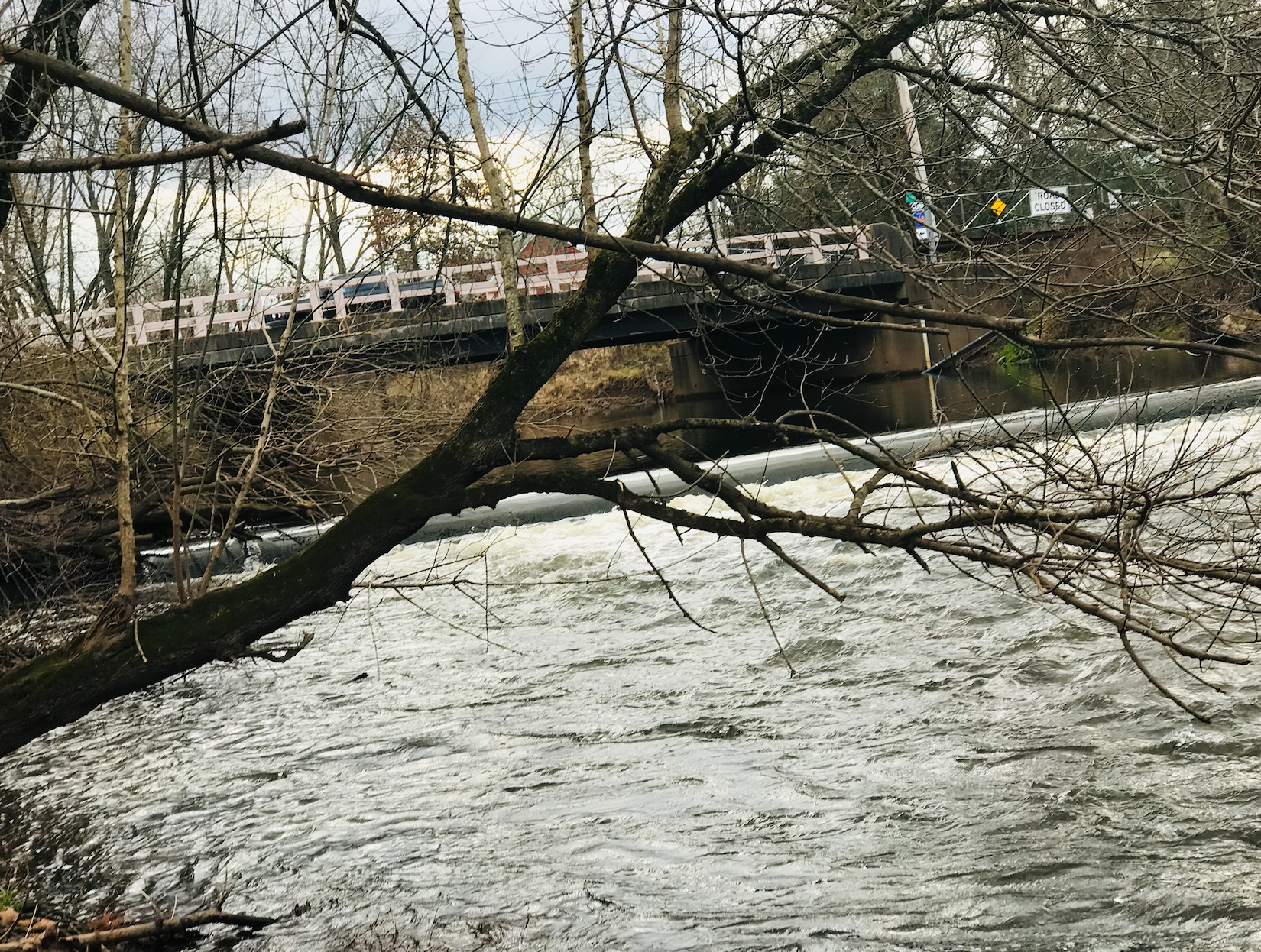
Millstone River near the eastern border of Hillsborough Township (Somerset County).

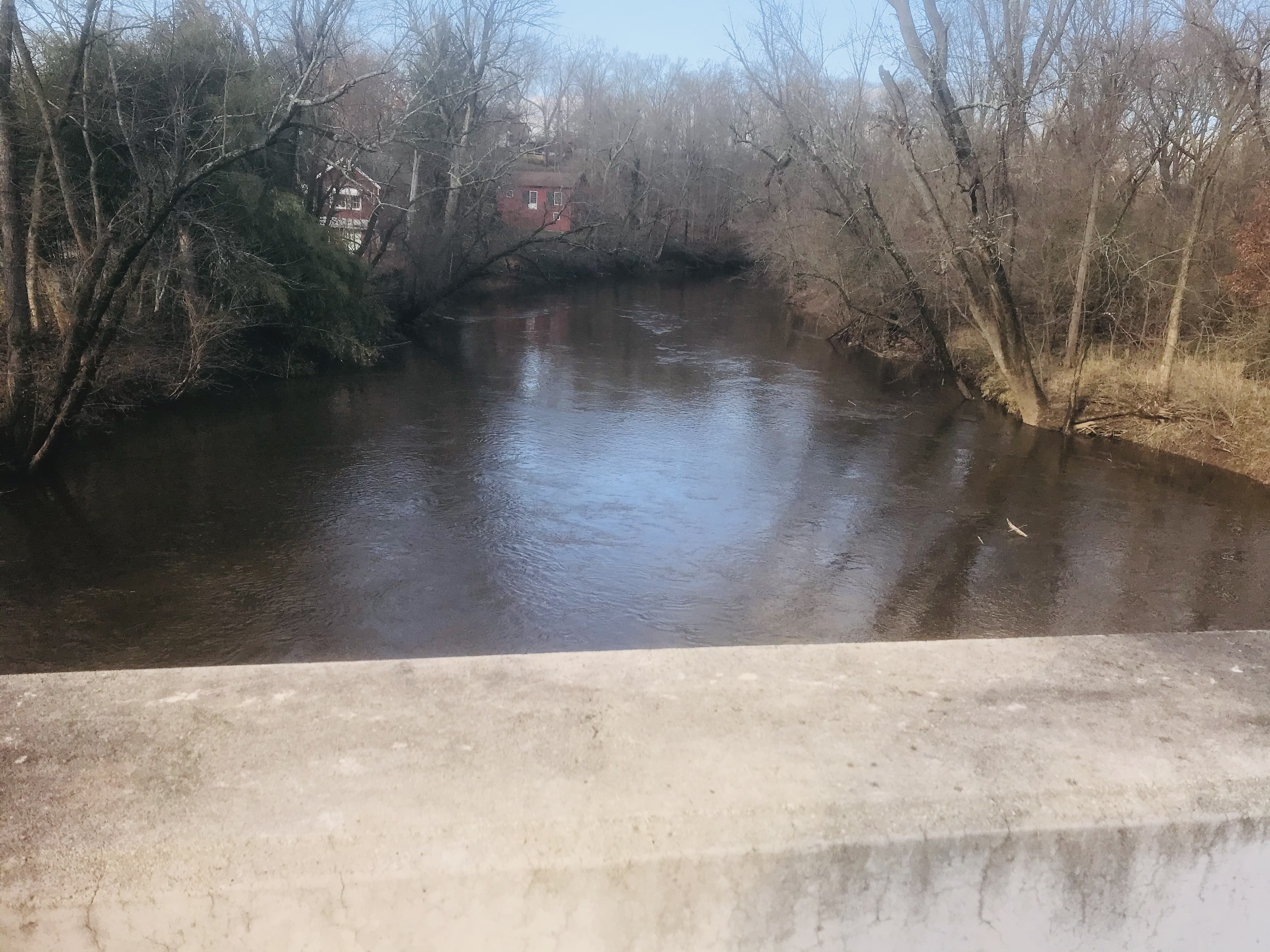
Millstone River flowing near Millstone Borough (Somerset County).

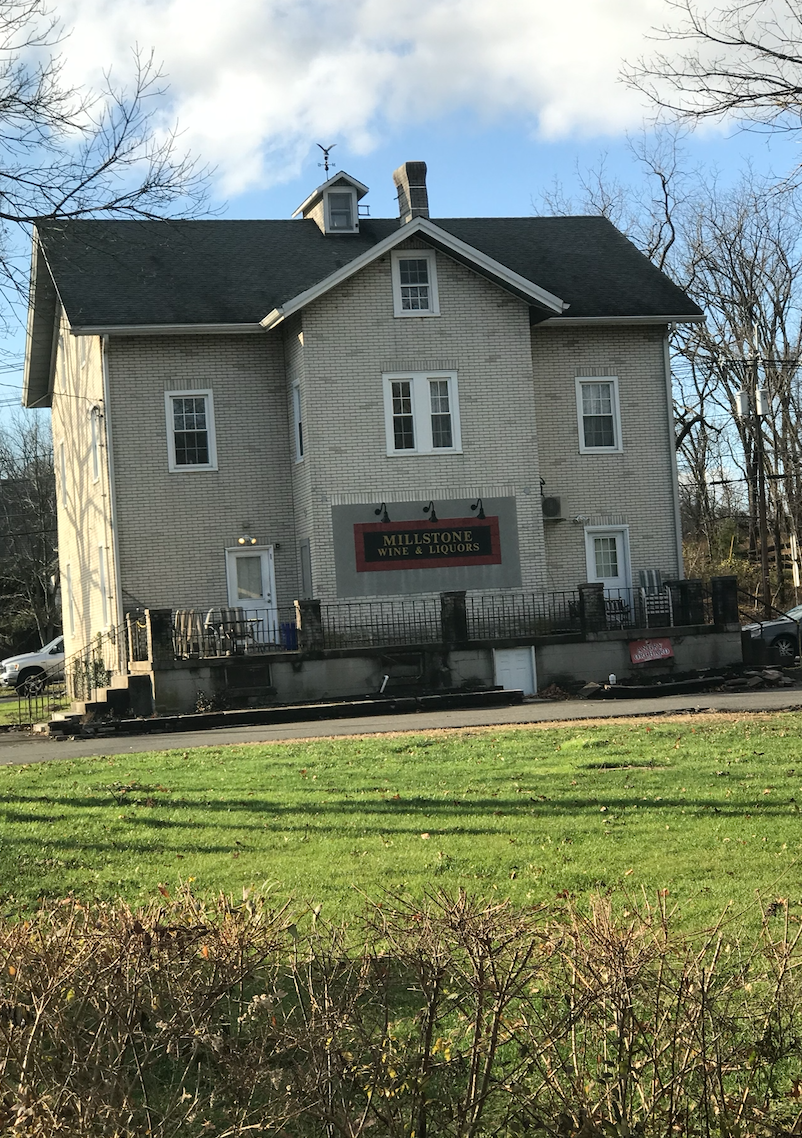
Millstone Wine & Liquor is located right along the Millstone River.

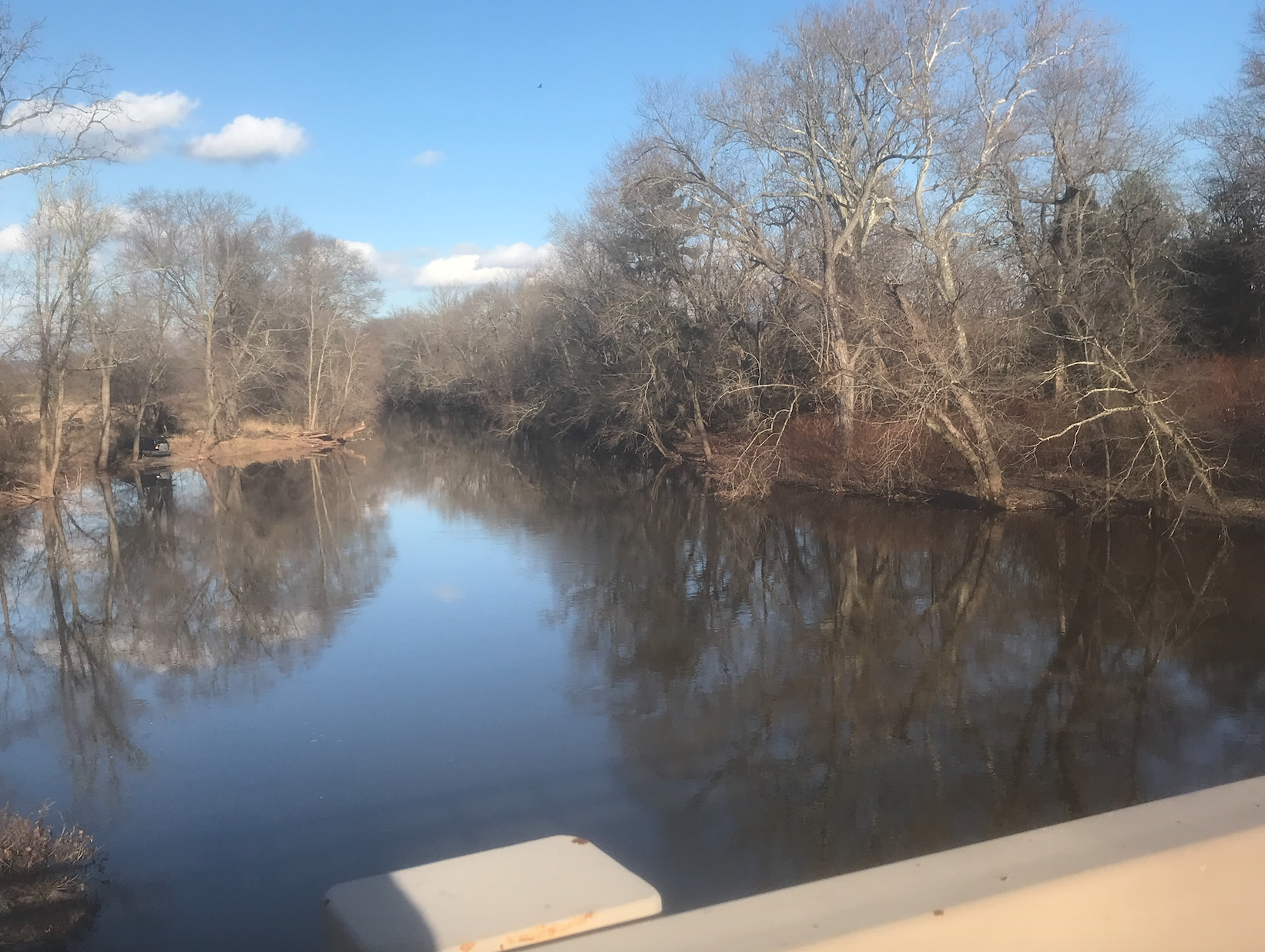
The Millstone River downstream under the Manville Causeway in Manville (Somerset County).

== Tributaries ==
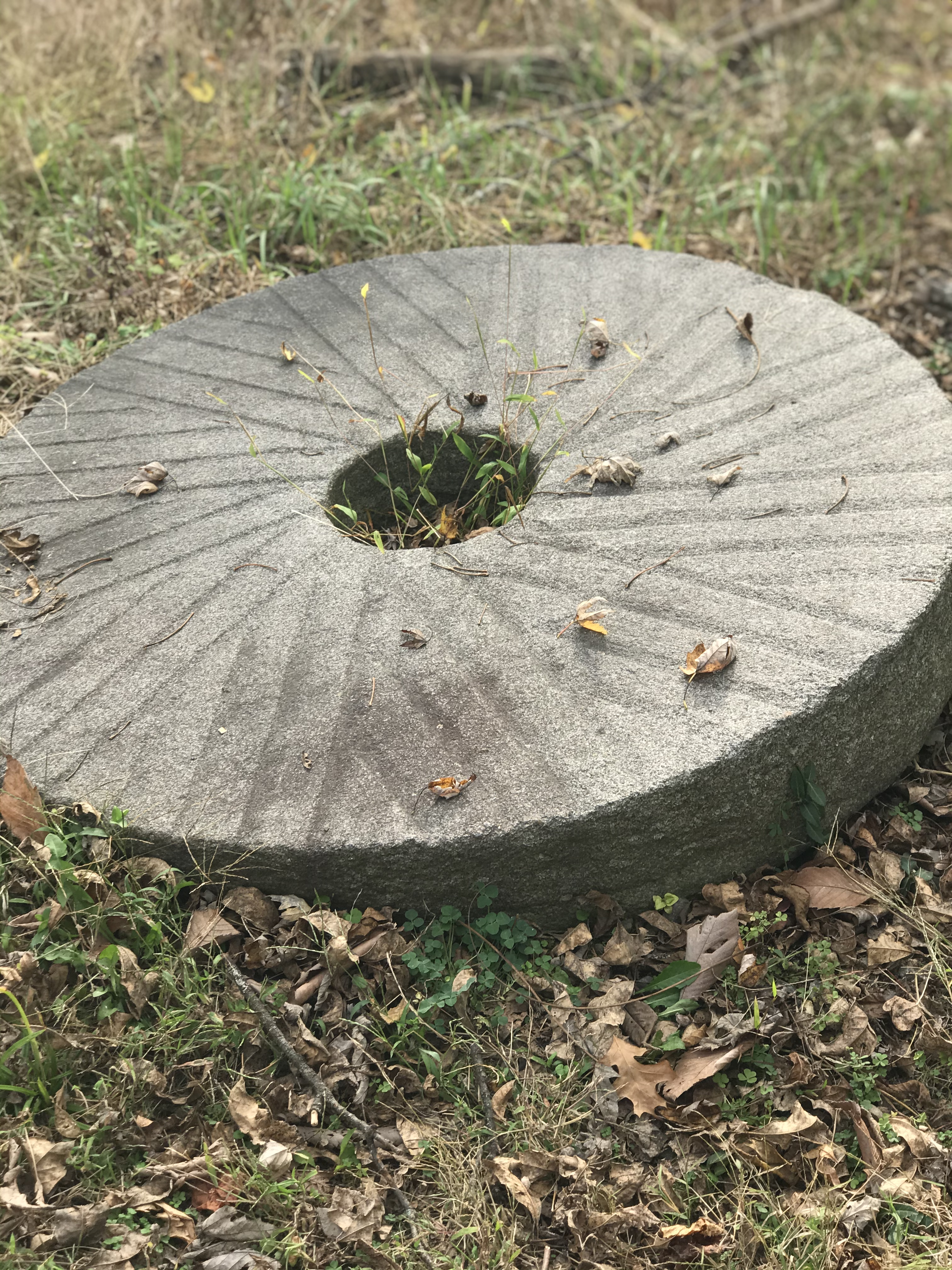
An example of what a millstone looked like.

- Beden Brook
  - Pike Run
  - Rock Brook
- Bear Brook
- Cranbury Brook
  - Cedar Brook
- Devils Brook
  - Shallow Brook
- Harrys Brook
- Heathcote Brook
  - Carters Brook
  - Heathcote Brook Branch
- Indian Run Brook
- Little Bear Brook
- Millstone Brook
- Peace Brook
- Rocky Brook
  - Timber Run
- Royce Brook
- Simonson Brook
- Six Mile Run
- Stony Brook
  - Baldwins Creek
  - Duck Pond Run
  - Honey Branch
  - Lewis Brook
  - Peters Brook
  - Stony Brook Branch
  - Woodsville Brook
- Ten Mile Run
- Van Horn Brook

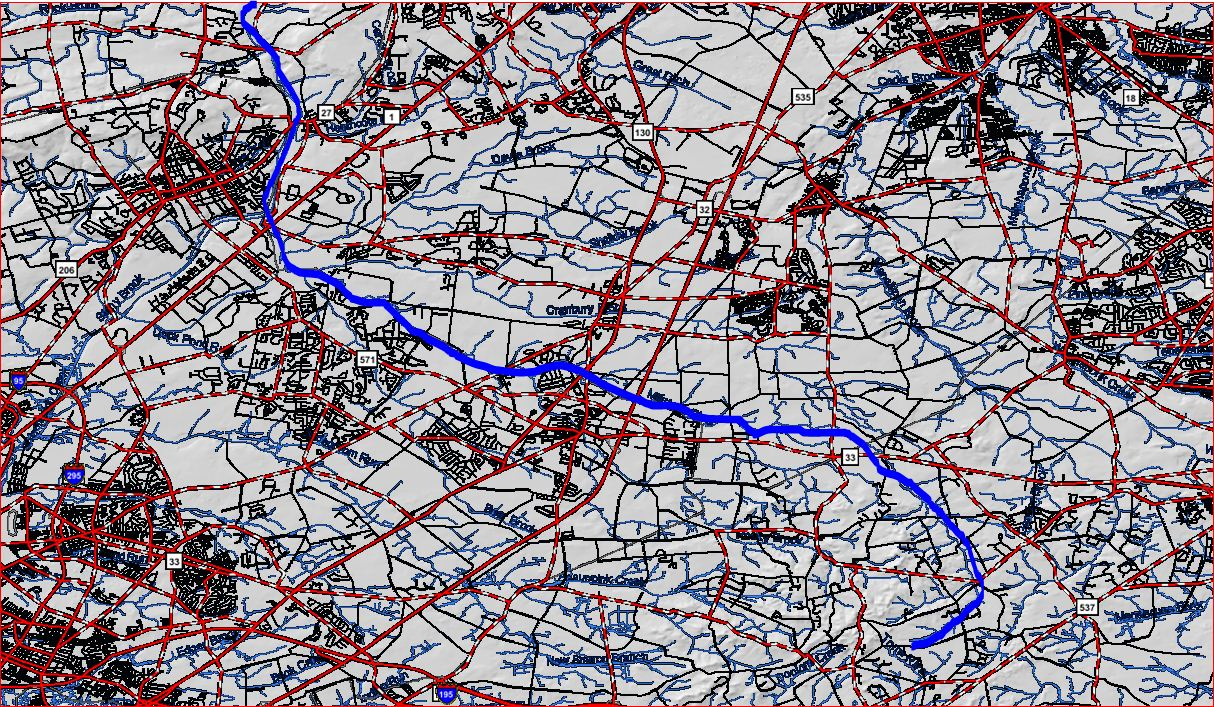
Map of southern section of the Millstone River; see above for northern section

== Crossings ==
- New Jersey Route 33 in Millstone Township, New Jersey
- New Jersey Turnpike
- U.S. Route 130 connecting Cranbury Township, New Jersey to East Windsor Township, New Jersey
- U.S. Route 1 connecting Plainsboro Township, New Jersey to West Windsor Township, New Jersey
- New Jersey Route 27 connecting Kingston, New Jersey to Princeton, New Jersey
- County Route 518 connecting Griggstown, New Jersey to Rocky Hill, New Jersey
- Griggstown Causeway connecting Griggstown, New Jersey to Hillsborough, New Jersey
- Blackwell Mills
- Amwell Avenue
- Interstate 287

== See also ==
- List of rivers of New Jersey
- Battle of Millstone (Battle of Van Nest's Mill)
