= Cranbury Brook =

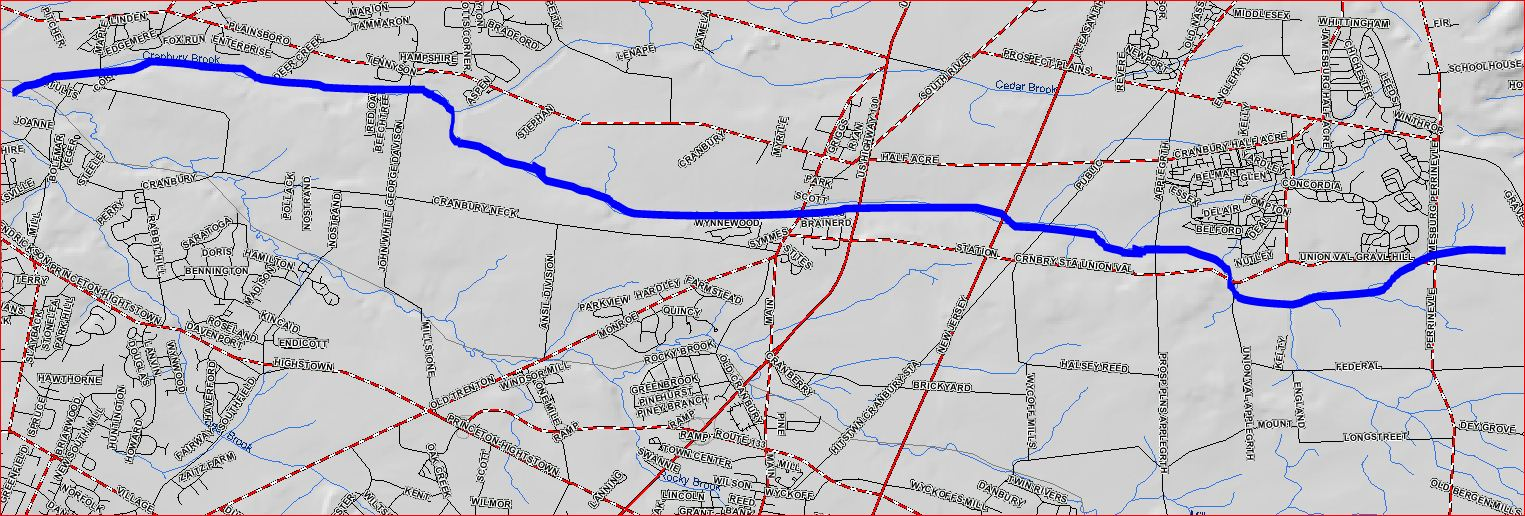
- Map of Cranbury Brook

Location
- Country: United States

Physical characteristics
- Source
  - coordinates: 40°15′37″N 74°24′5″W
- Mouth
  - coordinates: 40°19′26″N 74°36′47″W
  - elevation: 52 ft (16 m)

Basin features
- Progression: Millstone River, Raritan River, Atlantic Ocean
- Tributaries
  - left: Cedar Brook

Cranbury Brook, also known as Cranberry Brook, is a tributary of the Millstone River in Middlesex and Monmouth Counties, New Jersey in the United States.

== Course ==
Cranbury Brook starts at 40°15′37″N 74°24′5″W, near the intersection of Route 33, Dugans Grove Road, and Iron Ore Road. It flows westward, crossing Perrineville Road. It receives several tributaries from the area and crosses Union Valley Road and Applegarth Road. It then crosses the New Jersey Turnpike, and is dammed to form Brainerd Lake. As a lake it crosses Route 130 and South Main Street in the town of Cranbury. It continues flowing west through the Cranbury Preserve and receives the Cedar Brook. It then crosses George Davison Ave and forms another dammed section known as Plainsboro Pond. It then crosses Maple Ave and drains into the Millstone River at 40°19′26″N 74°36′47″W.

== Accessibility ==
Cranbury Brook is easily accessed by many road crossings and dammed sections such as Brainerd Lake.

== Sister tributaries ==
- Beden Brook
- Bear Brook
- Devils Brook
- Harrys Brook
- Heathcote Brook
- Indian Run Brook
- Little Bear Brook
- Millstone Brook
- Peace Brook
- Rocky Brook
- Royce Brook
- Simonson Brook
- Six Mile Run
- Stony Brook
- Ten Mile Run
- Van Horn Brook

== See also ==
- List of rivers of New Jersey
