= Ten Mile Run (New Jersey) =

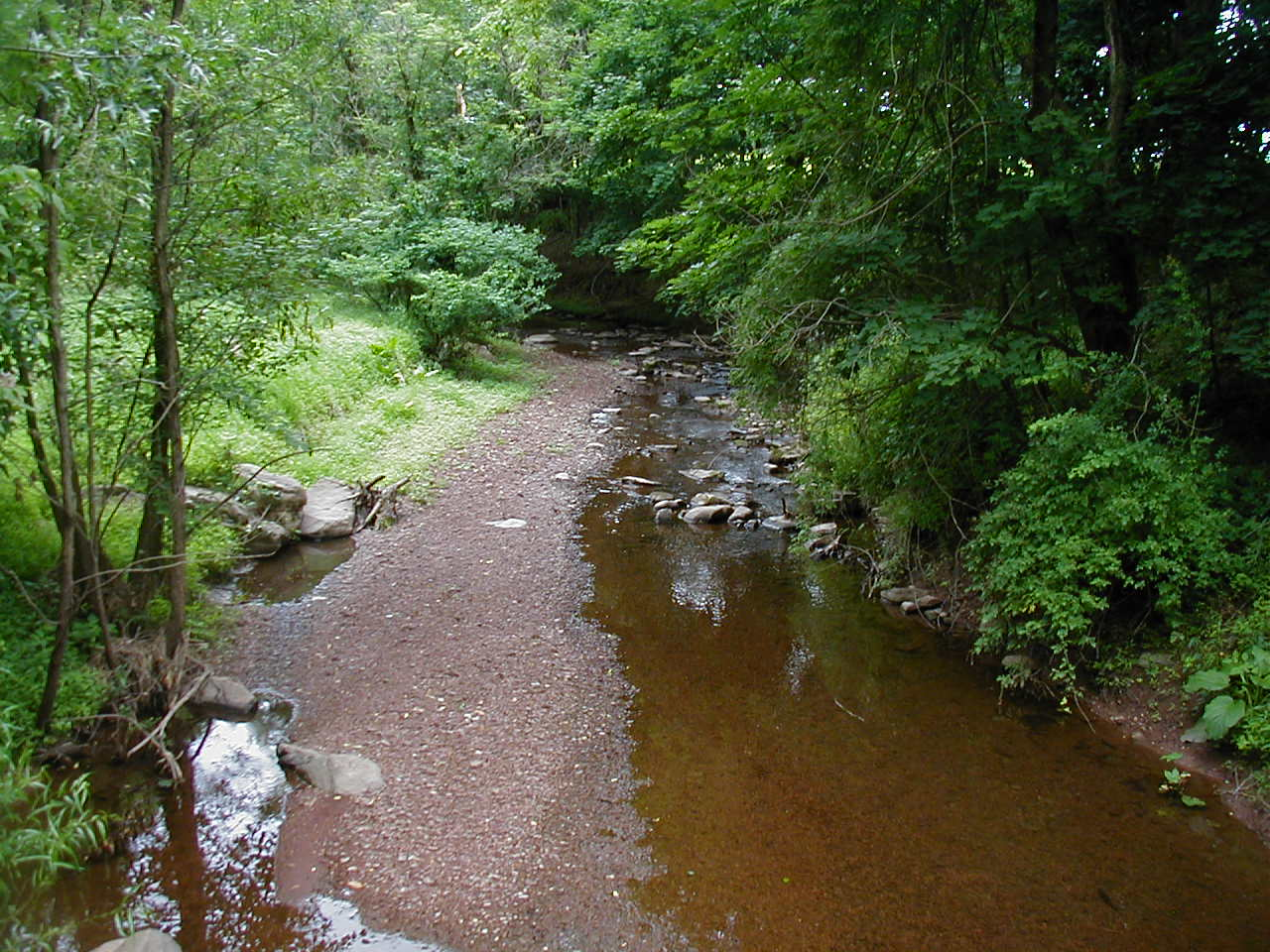
- Ten Mile Run crossing Canal Road, near its mouth at the Millstone River

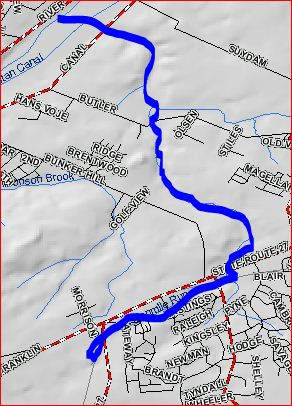
- Map of local area showing Ten Mile Run (highlighted)

Location
- Country: United States

Physical characteristics
- Source
  - coordinates: 40°24′39″N 74°35′27″W
- Mouth
  - coordinates: 40°27′28″N 74°35′29″W
  - elevation: 39 ft (12 m)

Basin features
- Progression: Millstone River, Raritan River, Atlantic Ocean

Ten Mile Run is a tributary of the Millstone River, draining an area in southern South Brunswick and southern Franklin Park, New Jersey in the United States.

Its name is derived from the distance early surveyors estimated it was from the Raritan River on the historic Kings Highway, now Route 27.

== Course ==
Ten Mile Run starts at 40°24′39″N 74°35′27″W, near the intersection of the Georgetown-Franklin Turnpike and Route 27. It crosses Route 27 and Gateway Boulevard. It then runs through the edge of a residential development and crosses New Road. It then joins several other tributaries that come from the development. It crosses Route 27 again, where it is marked with a sign. It follows a course roughly parallel to Bunker Hill Road and flows through Bunker Hill Golf Course. It crosses Butler Road and receives more tributaries. It flows through the T&C Preservation Land adjacent to the Delaware and Raritan Canal and drains into the Millstone River at 40°27′28″N 74°35′29″W.

== Accessibility ==
Ten Mile Run is accessible by both road and trail in many places, such as the Bunker Hill Golf Course, the Bunker Hill Natural Area, the Ten Mile Run Greenway, and several others.

== Animal life ==
Ten Mile Run is home to a multitude of small fishes with sizes ranging from 1 to 6 inches. It also is home to several frogs in the slow-moving places. Several crayfish may be found through baiting or diligent searching.

== Terrain ==
Ten Mile Run is generally rocky. Its tributaries in the residential development are completely rocky and come from springs routed underground through storm drainage systems. Near Butler Road, the stream has natural floors, smooth rocks covering the streambed. They tend to be slippery from underwater plants. Some shale cliffs are present near the stream, similar to but smaller than the ones lining the Nine Mile Run. Farther downstream, sandy streambeds predominate.

== Sister tributaries ==
- Beden Brook
- Bear Brook
- Cranbury Brook
- Devils Brook
- Harrys Brook
- Heathcote Brook
- Indian Run Brook
- Little Bear Brook
- Millstone Brook
- Peace Brook
- Rocky Brook
- Royce Brook
- Simonson Brook
- Six Mile Run
- Stony Brook
- Van Horn Brook

== Gallery ==
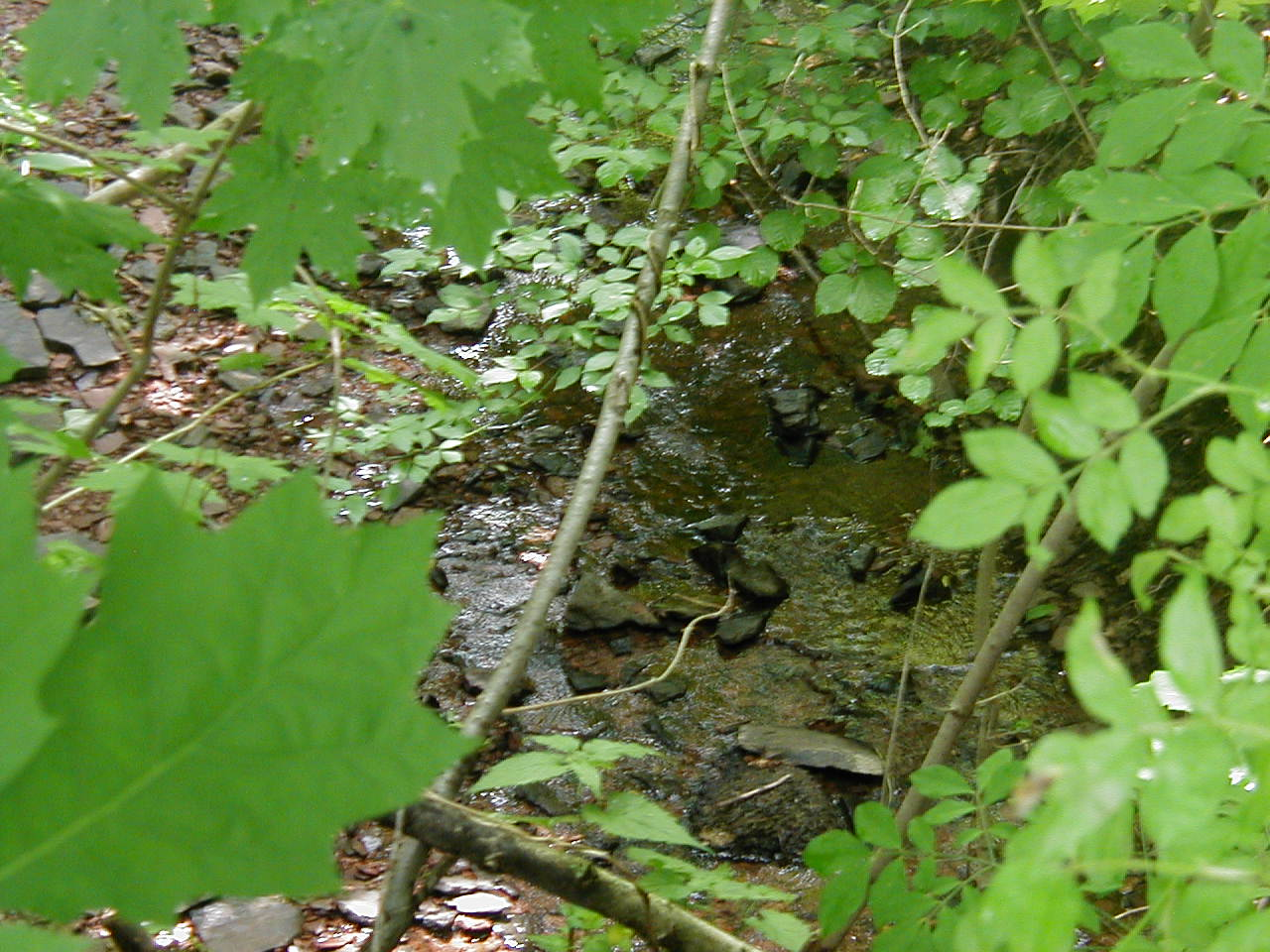
Ten Mile Run near its source, crossing Allston Road

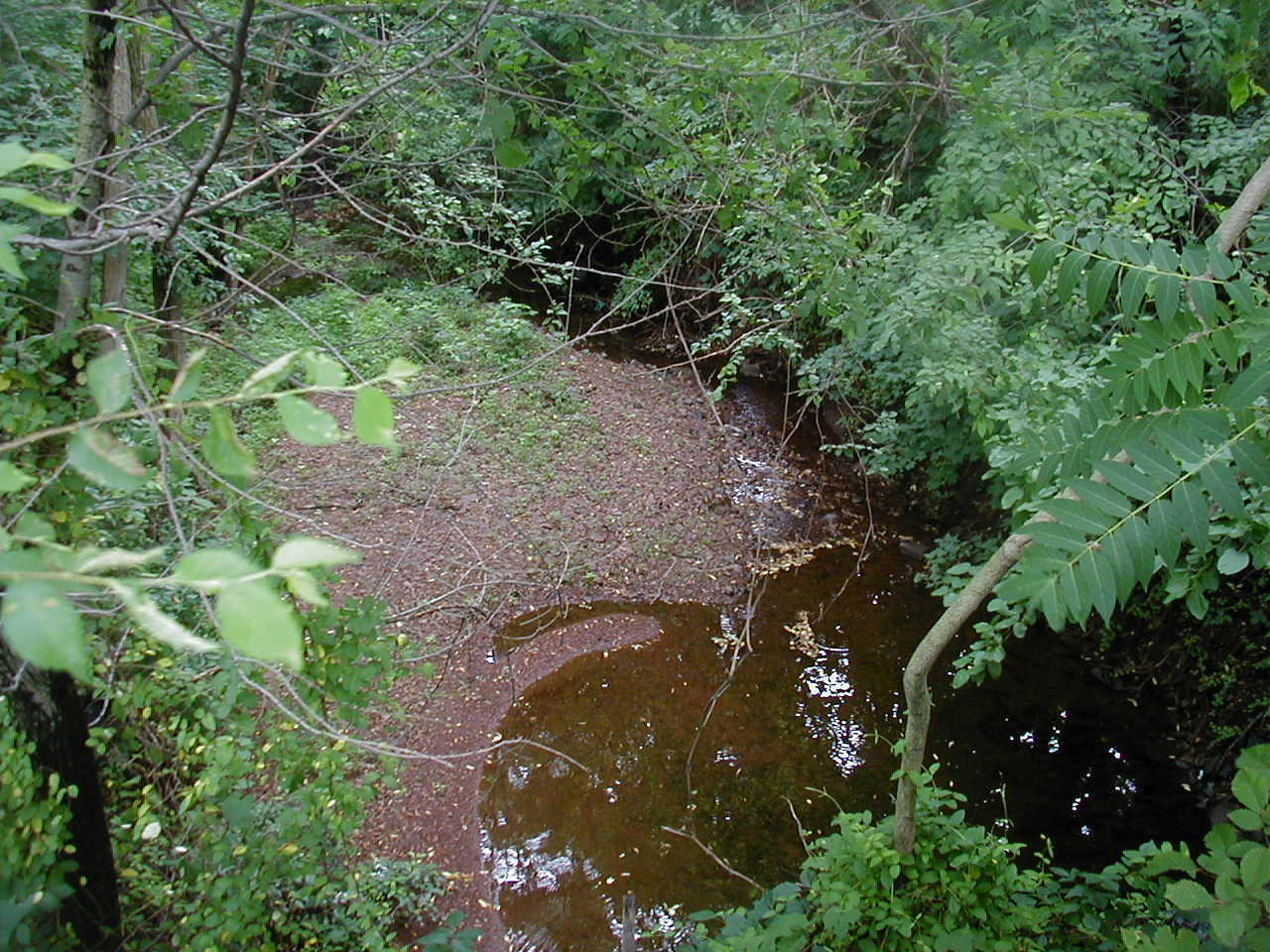
Ten Mile Run crossing New Road

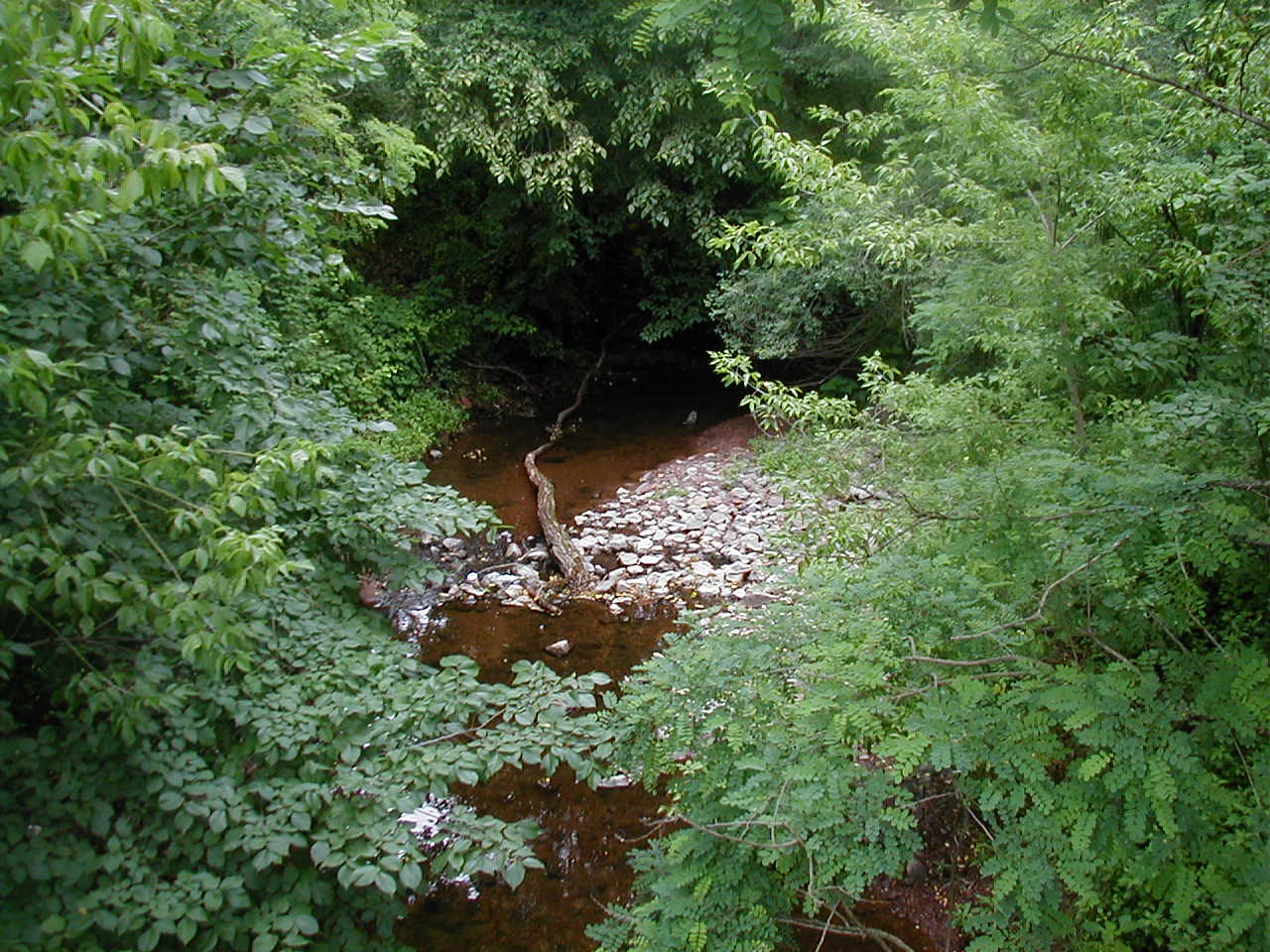
Ten Mile Run crossing New Road

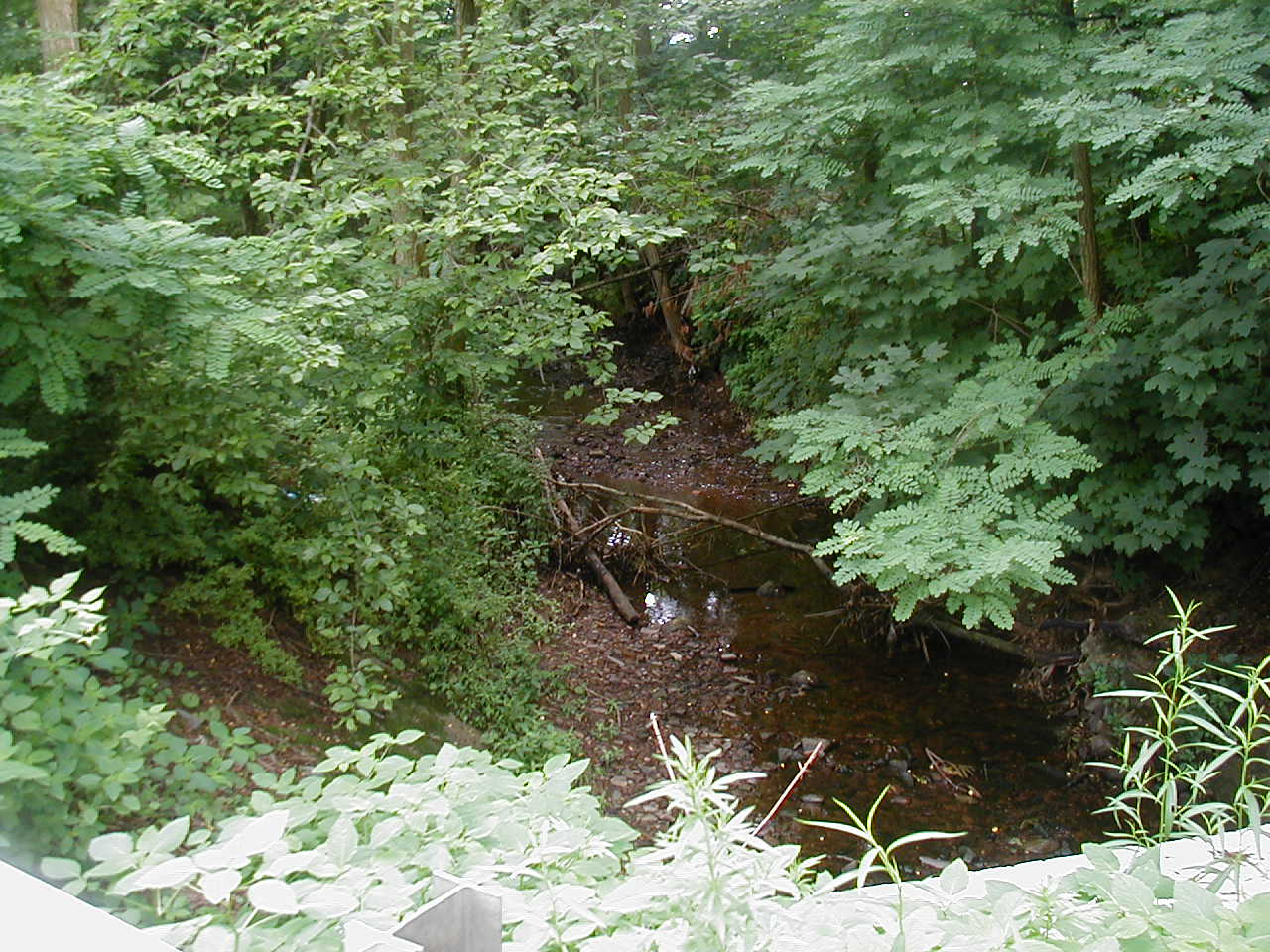
A branch of the Ten Mile Run crossing New Road at Kingsley Park

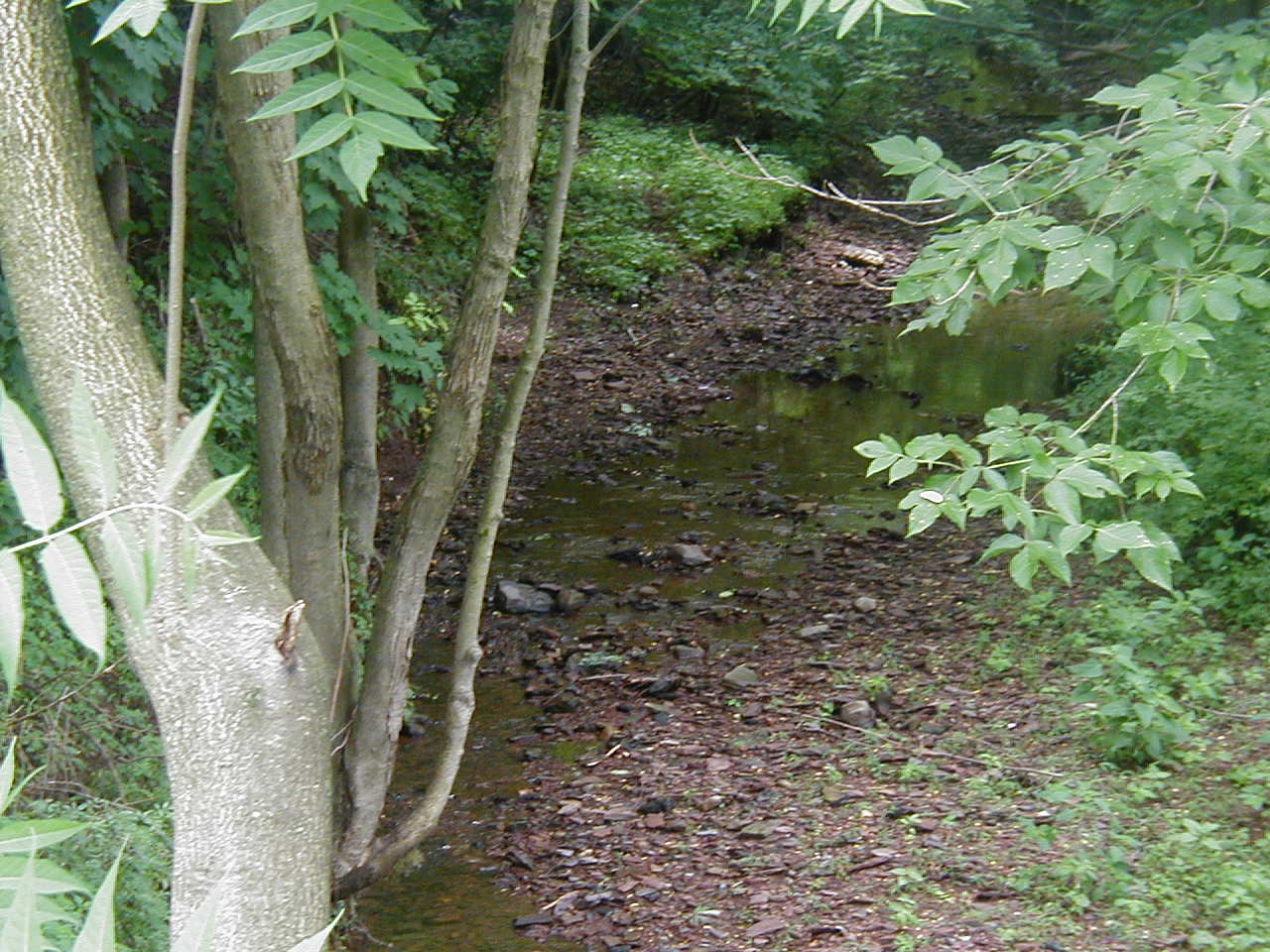
A branch of the Ten Mile Run crossing New Road near Kingsley Park

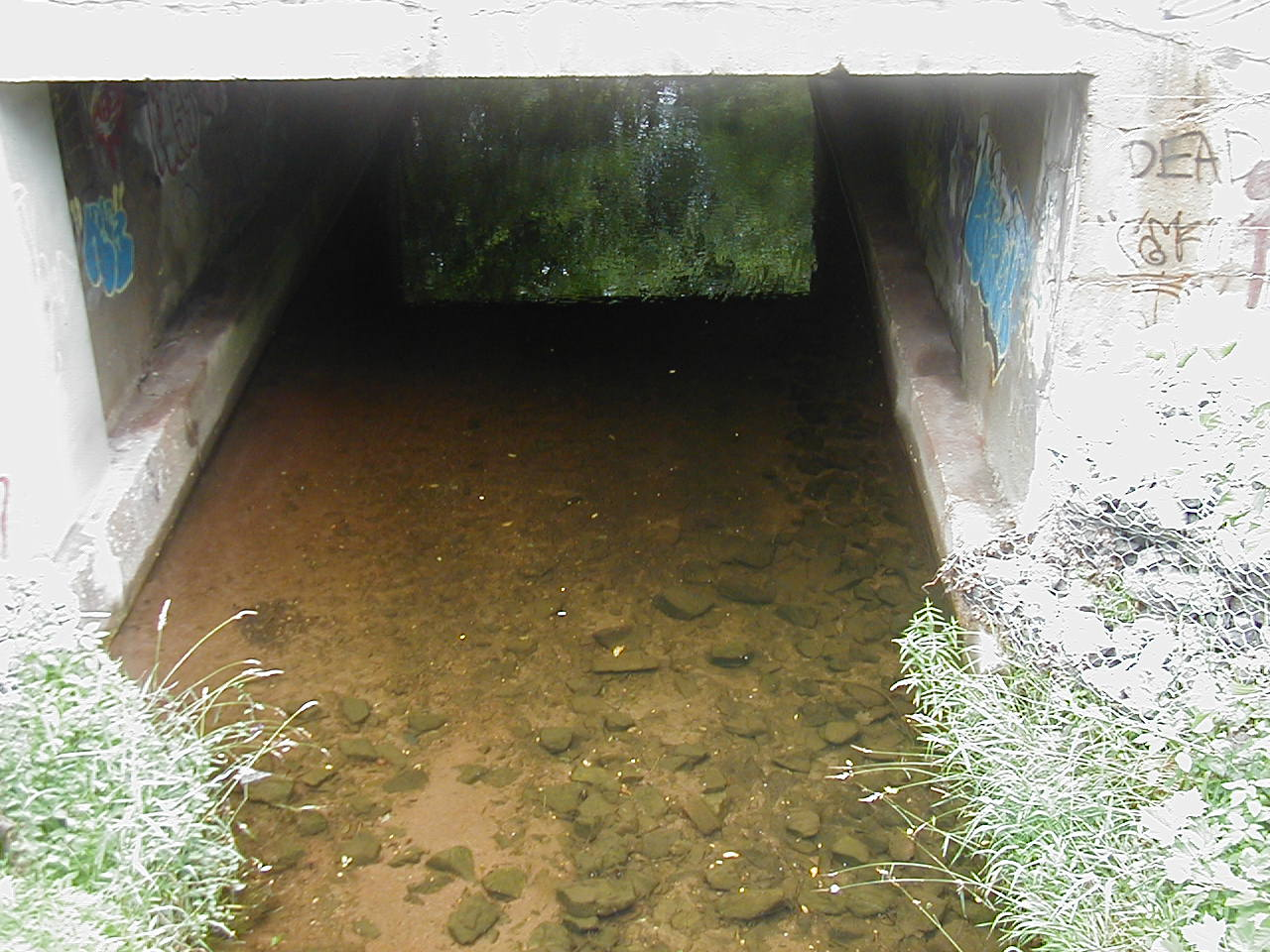
Ten Mile Run crossing Route 27; viewed from a nearby pedestrian bridge

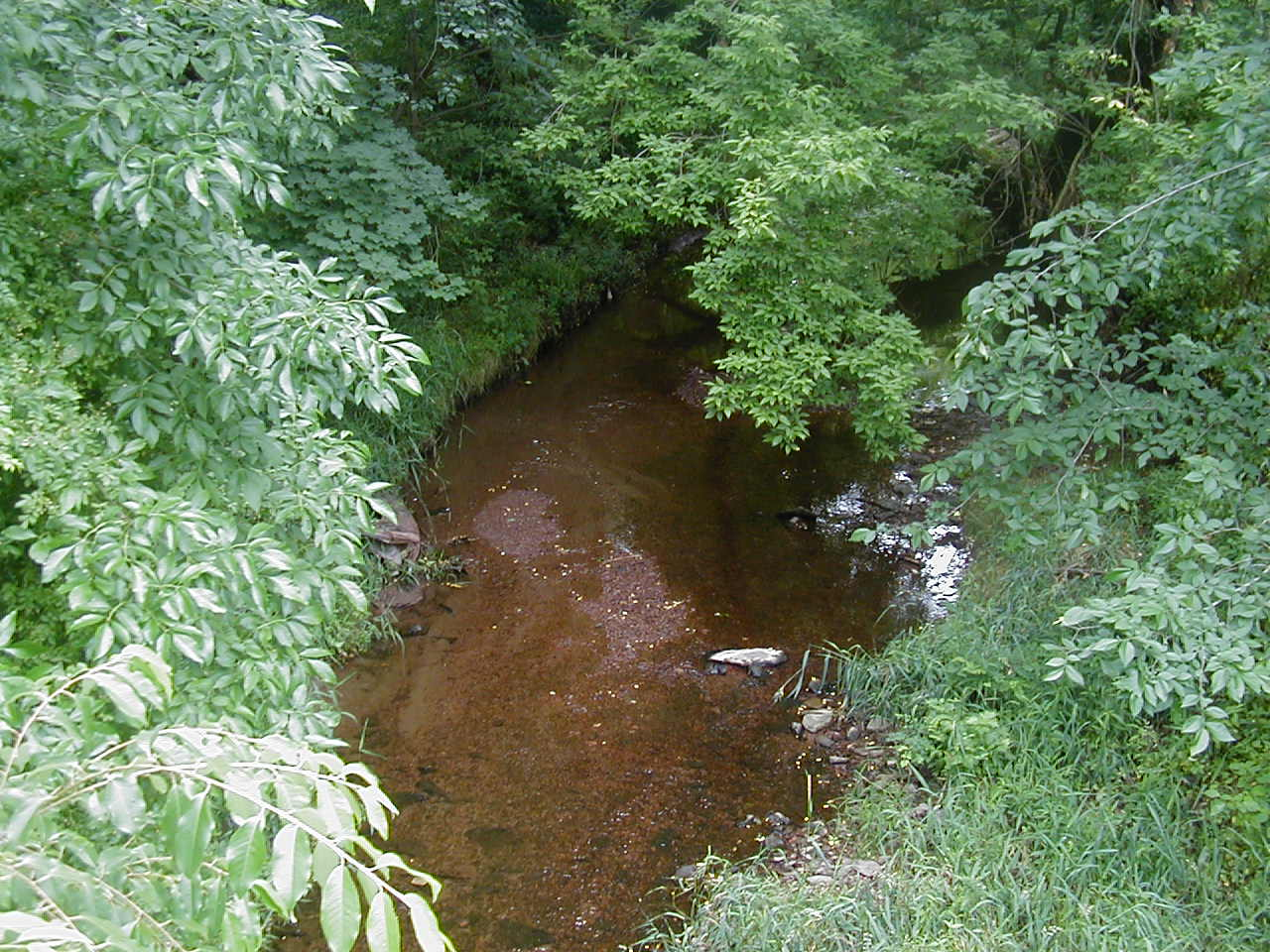
Ten Mile Run crossing Route 27, ten miles from the Raritan River crossing on Route 27

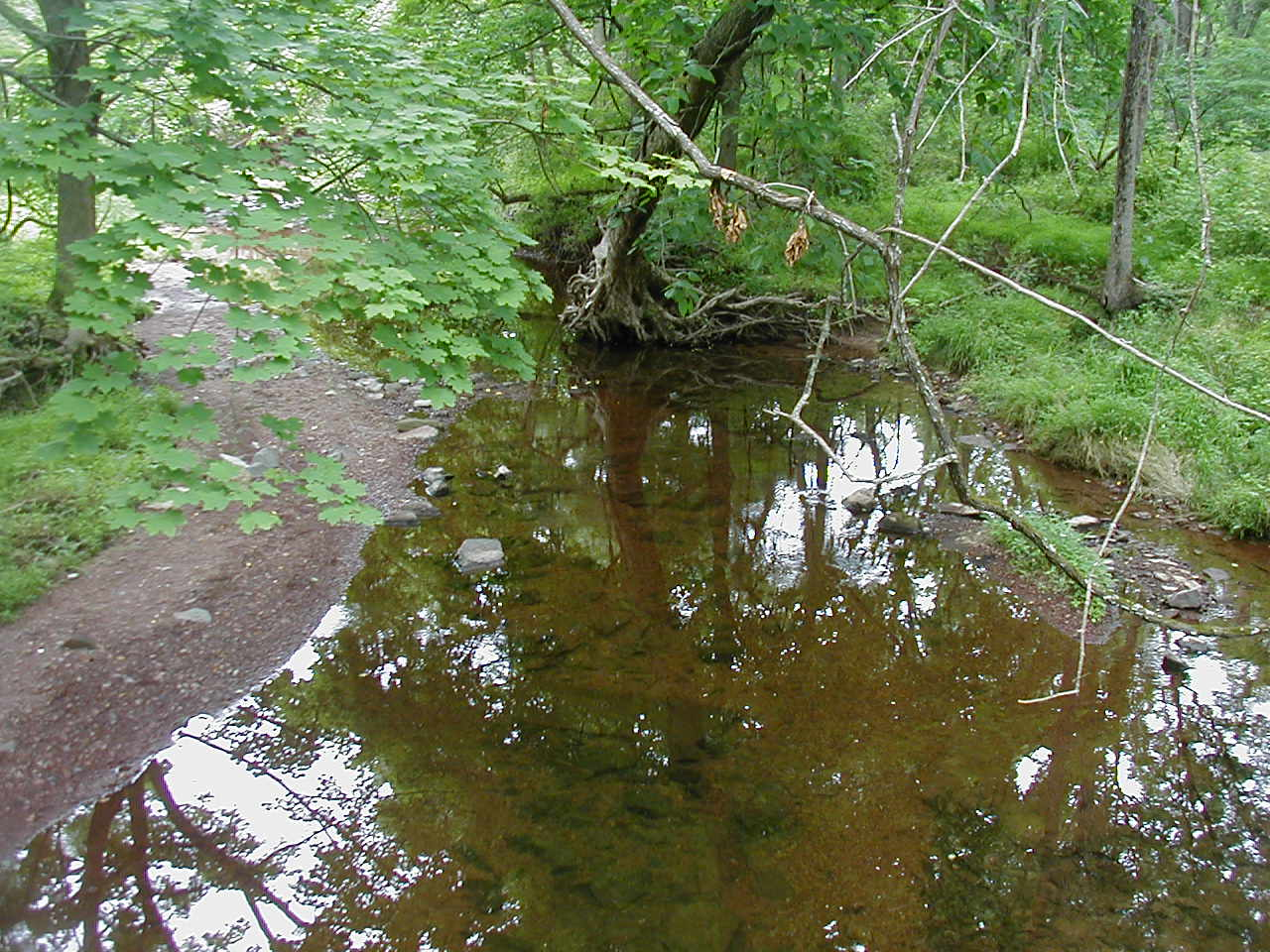
Ten Mile Run crossing Butler Road, in the Butler Road Natural Area

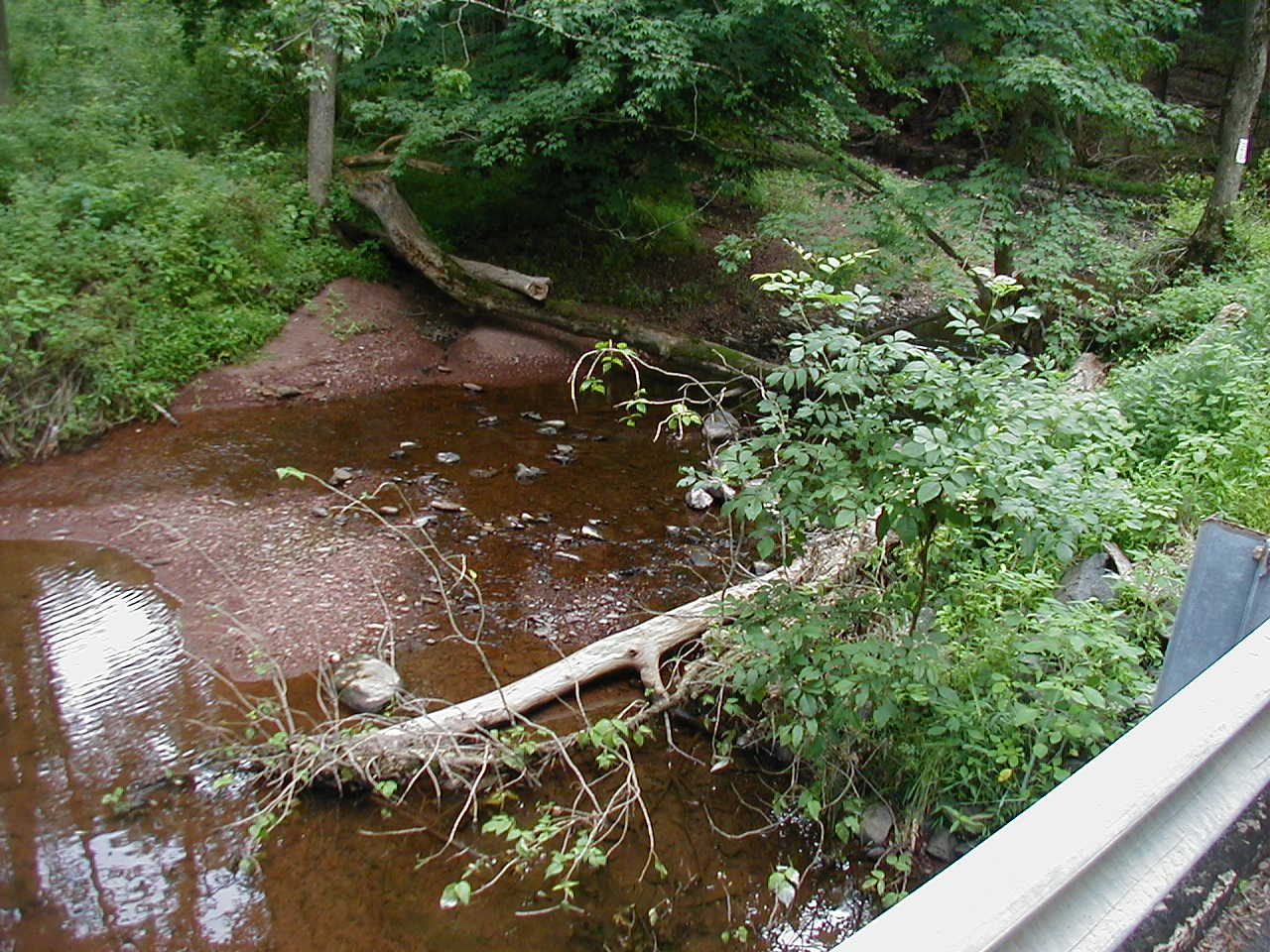
Ten Mile Run crossing Butler Road

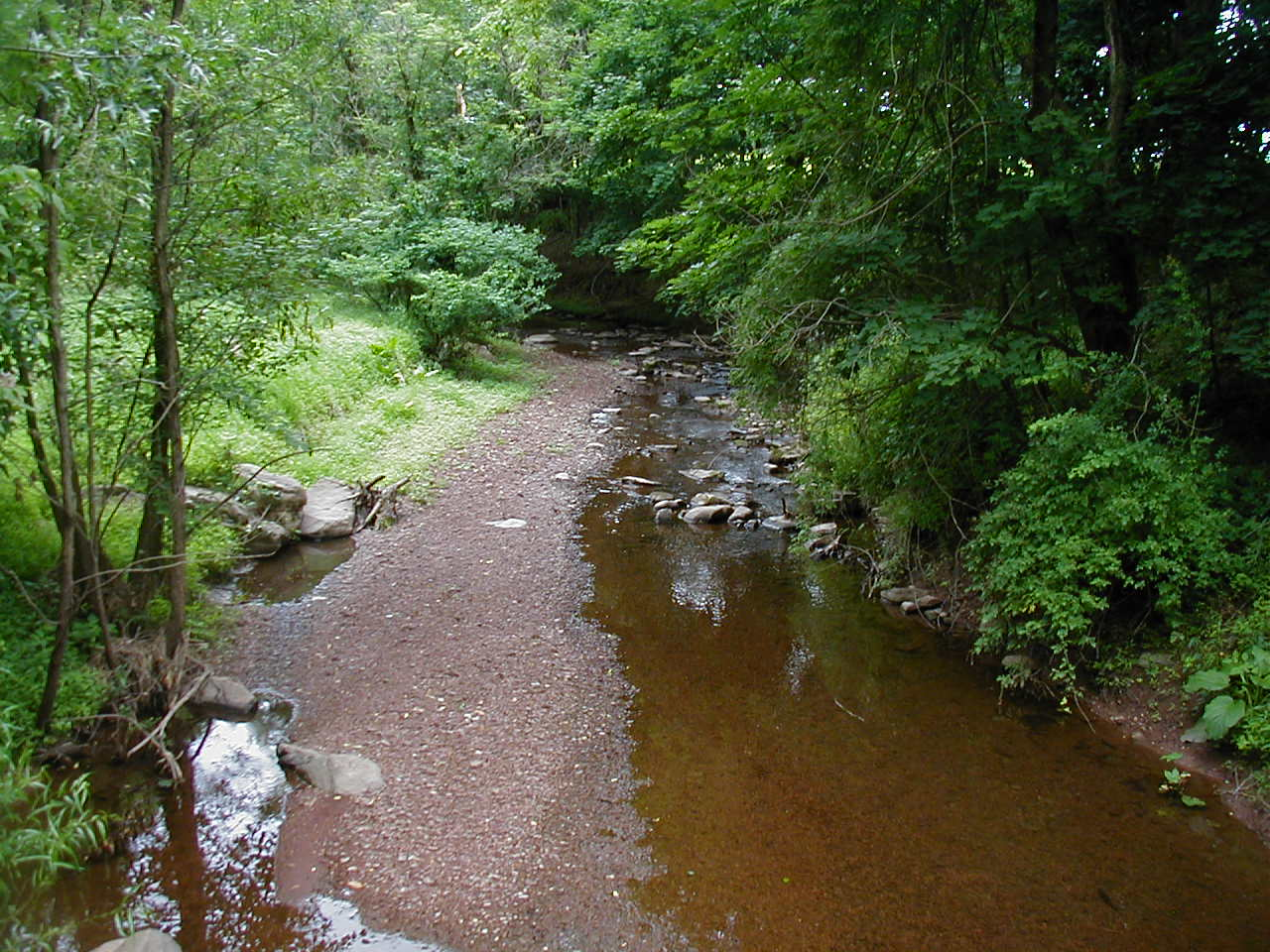
Ten Mile Run crossing Canal Road, just before its mouth

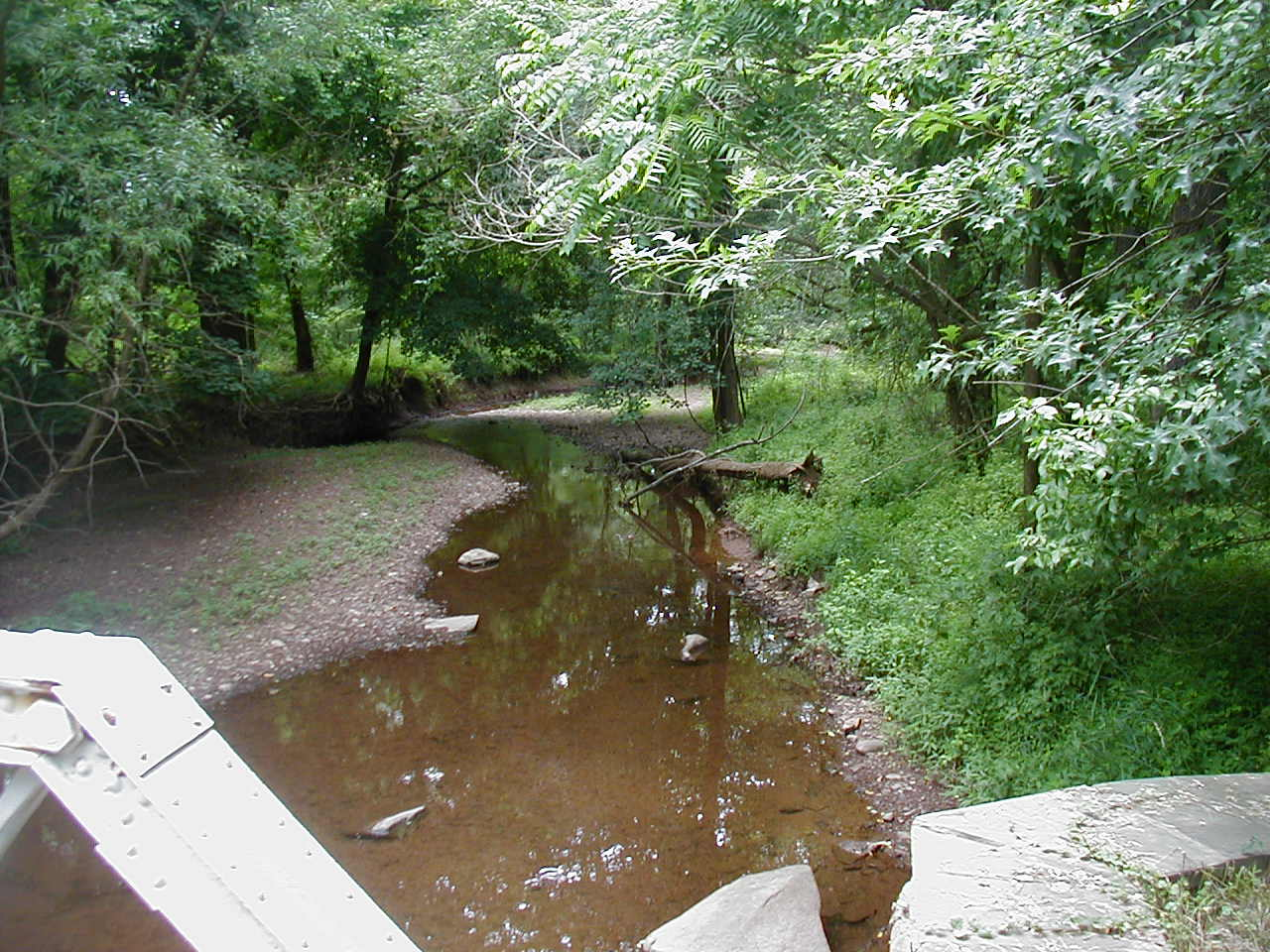
Ten Mile Run crossing Canal Road

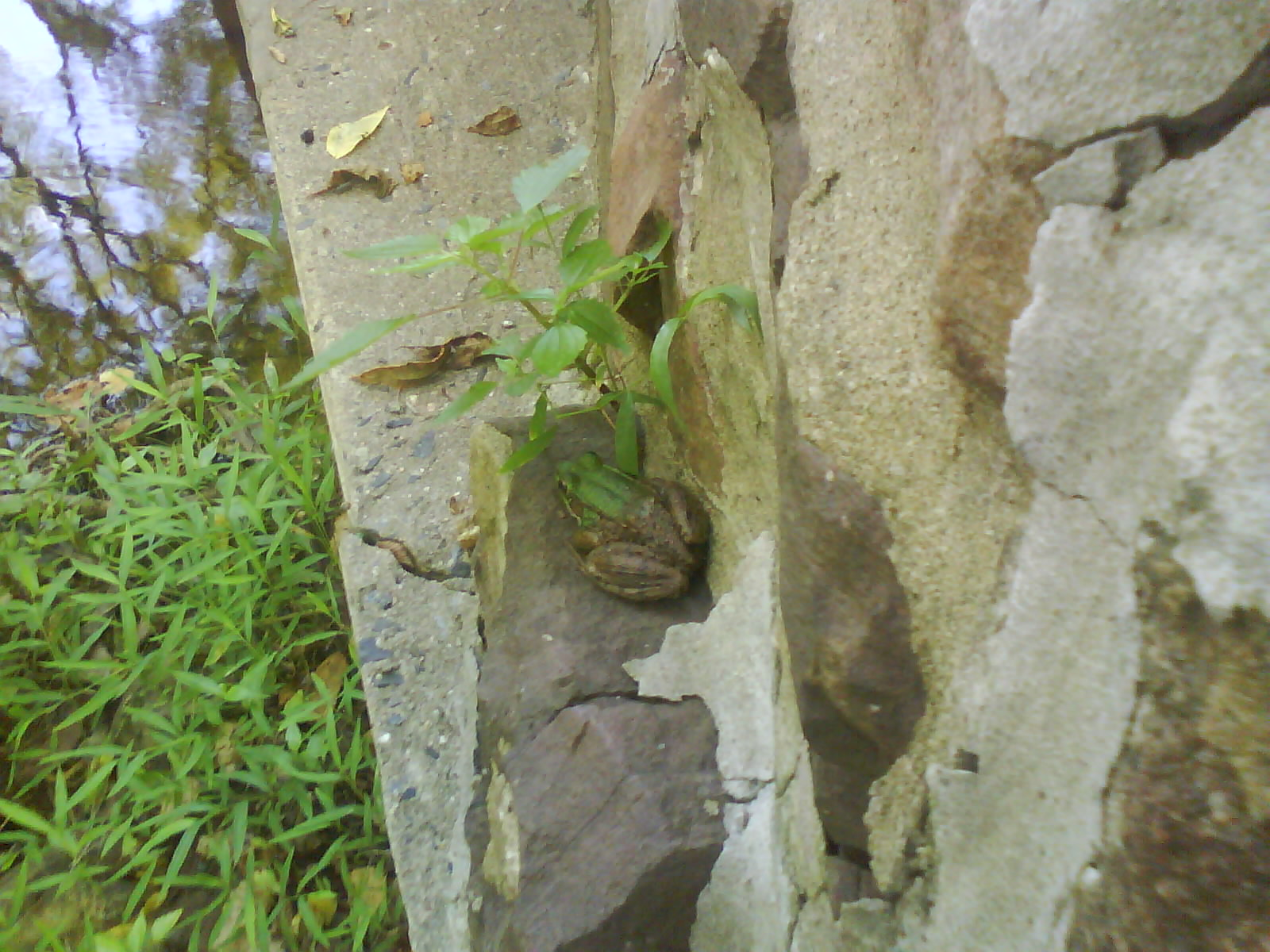
Frog perched on a ledge near the Ten Mile Run

== See also ==
- List of rivers of New Jersey
- Raritan River
- Millstone River
