= Simonson Brook (New Jersey) =

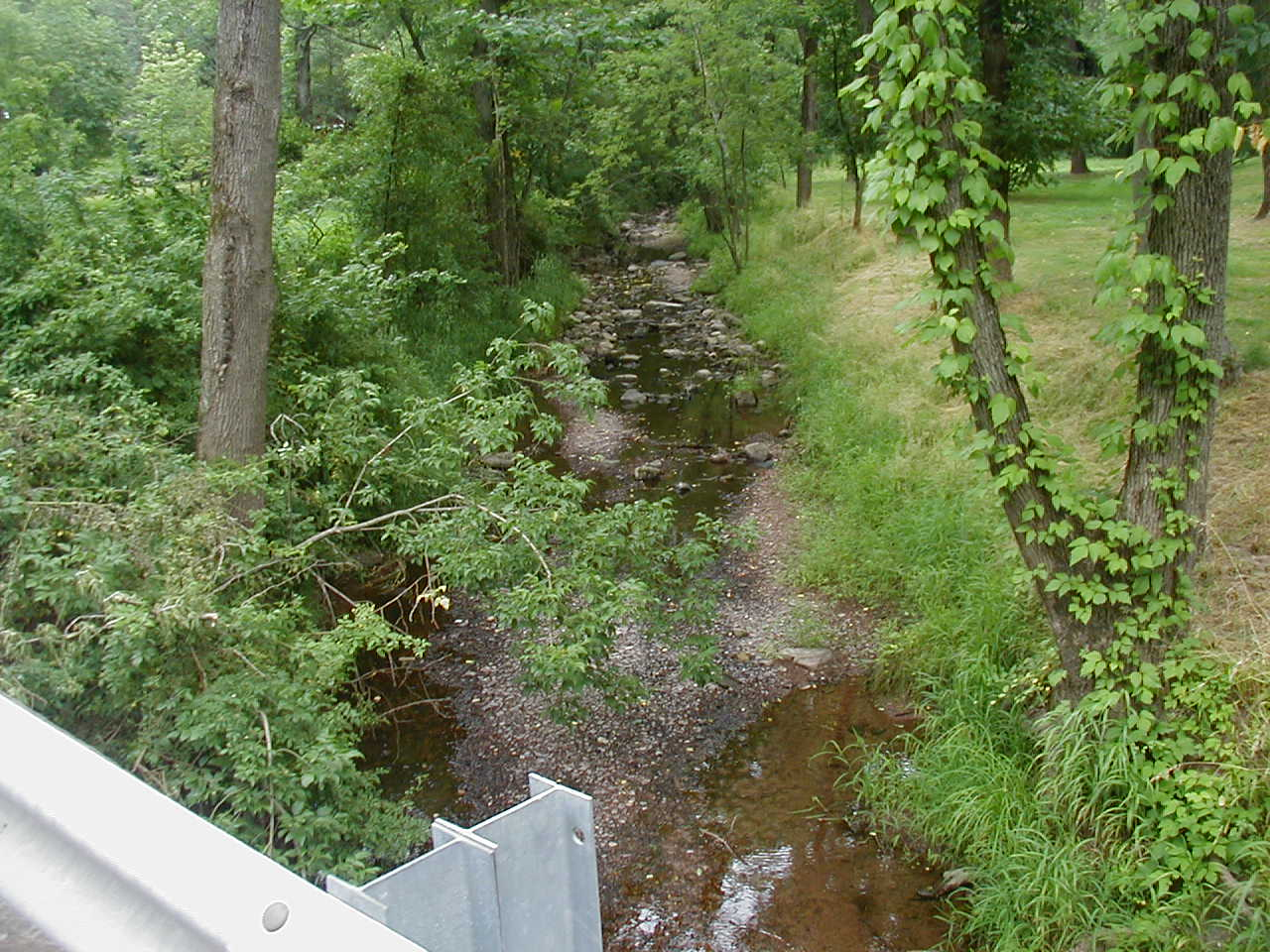
- Simonson Brook crossing Canal Road, near its mouth at the Millstone River

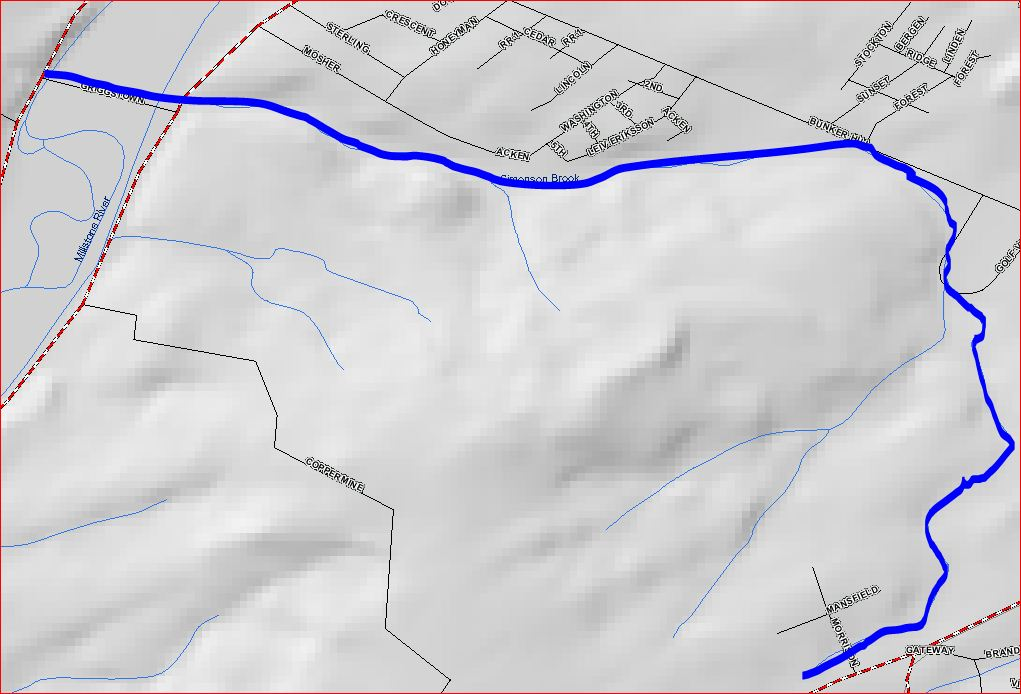
- Map of Simonson Brook

Location
- Country: United States

Physical characteristics
- Source
  - coordinates: 40°24′58″N 74°35′29″W
- Mouth
  - coordinates: 40°26′21″N 74°37′3″W
  - elevation: 36 ft (11 m)

Basin features
- Progression: Millstone River, Raritan River, Atlantic Ocean

Simonson Brook, also known as Sunonson Brook, is a tributary of the Millstone River in southern Franklin Park, Somerset County, New Jersey in the United States. Historically it was also known as Simonson's Brook, named for the Simonson family that had settled in the area prior to the construction of the Delaware and Raritan Canal.

== Course ==
Simonson Brook starts at 40°24′58″N 74°35′29″W, in southwestern Franklin Park near Route 27. It has several tributaries draining the area near Route 27. It runs through two housing developments then runs into the woods and flows near Bunker Hill Road, passing through the Bunker Hill Environmental Center and the Griggstown Native Grassland Preserve. It then crosses under Canal Road and under the Delaware and Raritan Canal, before draining into the Millstone River at 40°26′21″N 74°37′3″W.

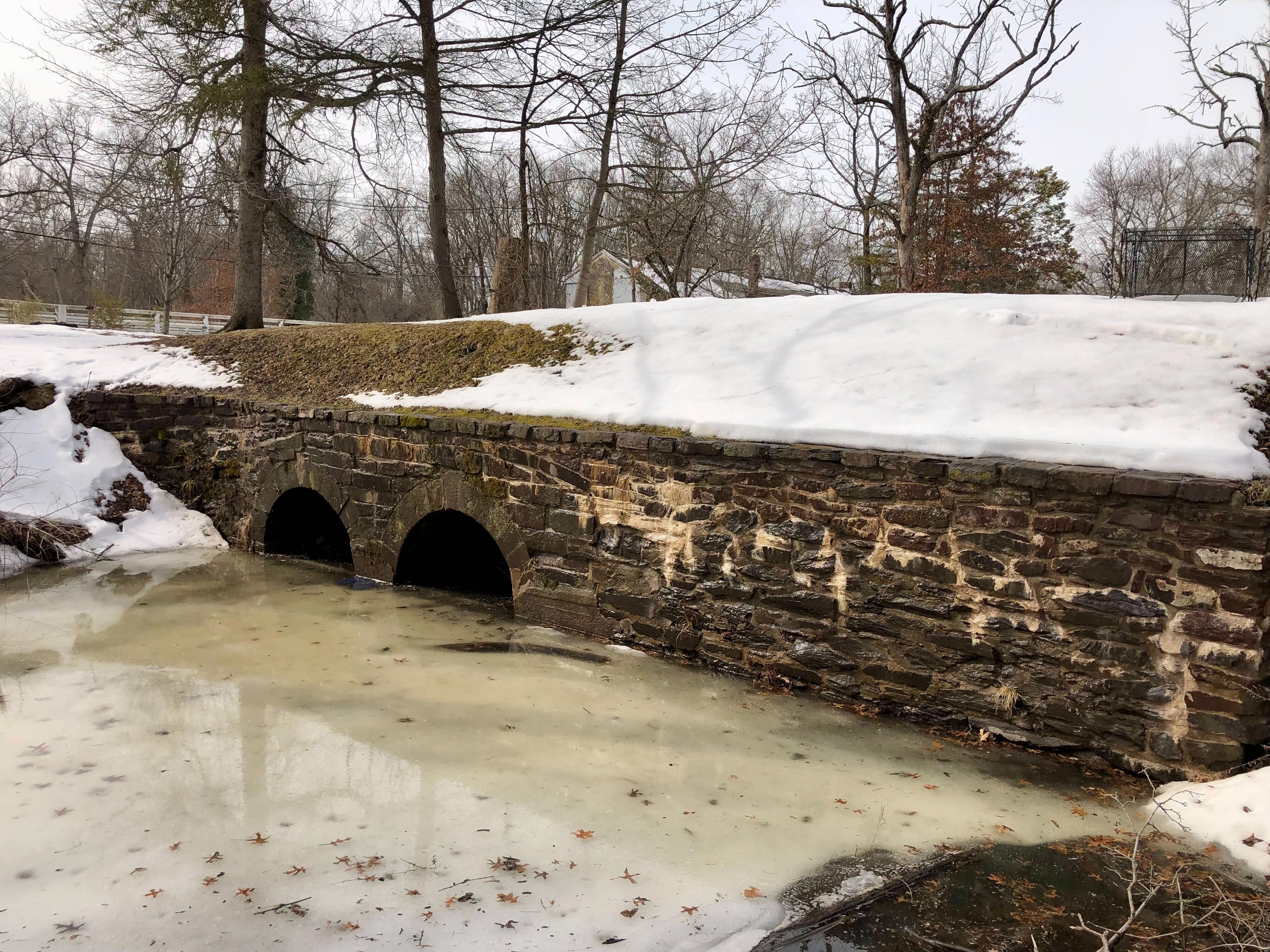
Simonson Brook passes under the Delaware and Raritan Canal in a double arch stone culvert constructed in the early 1830s.

The brook passes under the Delaware and Raritan Canal through a double stone arch culvert constructed at the same time as the canal itself in the early 1830s.

Simonson Brook is smaller than its fellow brooks, the Ten Mile Run and the Six Mile Run. Many of its stream beds are dry in summer.

== Accessibility ==
Simonson Brook can be accessed by trails in the Griggstown Native Grassland Preserve, part of the Ten Mile Run Greenway. It also crosses several roads, such as Barbieri Court and Ridings Parkway. It is easily accessible at Canal Road.

== Animal life ==
Simonson Brook has several slow spots which are home to frogs. It is characterized by deep pools in some tributaries which hold many fish.

== Terrain ==
This stream is very rocky near its mouth, with broken slate covering the streambed. Occasional deep pools exist on the streambed. It is fed by periodic springs, making it dry up very easily when it is not raining. Fish have a difficult time living in the stream because it dries up often.

== Sister tributaries ==
- Beden Brook
- Bear Brook
- Cranbury Brook
- Devils Brook
- Harrys Brook
- Heathcote Brook
- Indian Run Brook
- Little Bear Brook
- Millstone Brook
- Peace Brook
- Rocky Brook
- Royce Brook
- Six Mile Run
- Stony Brook
- Ten Mile Run
- Van Horn Brook

== Gallery ==
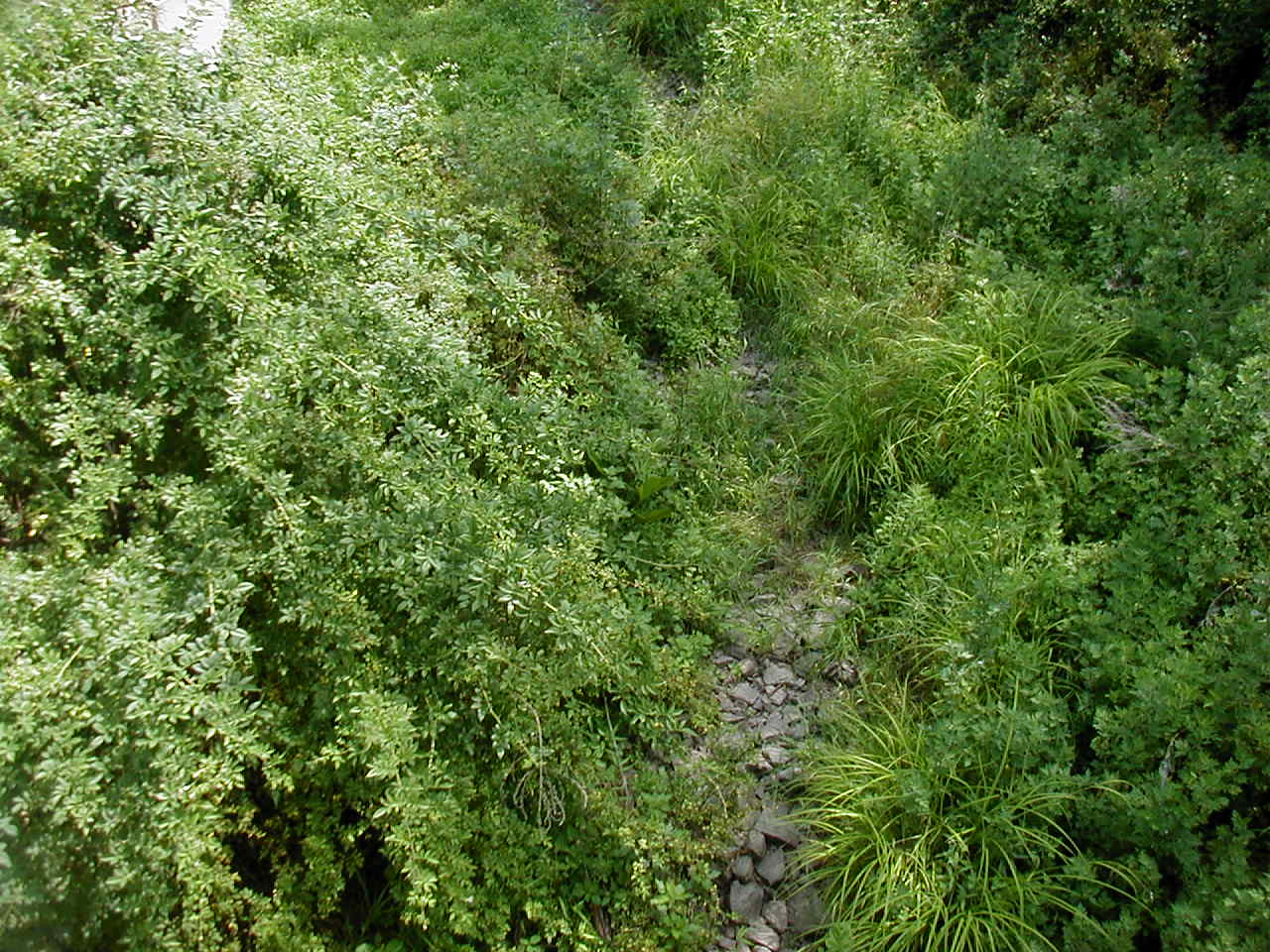
A branch of the Simonson Brook at Ridings Parkway, a dry bed

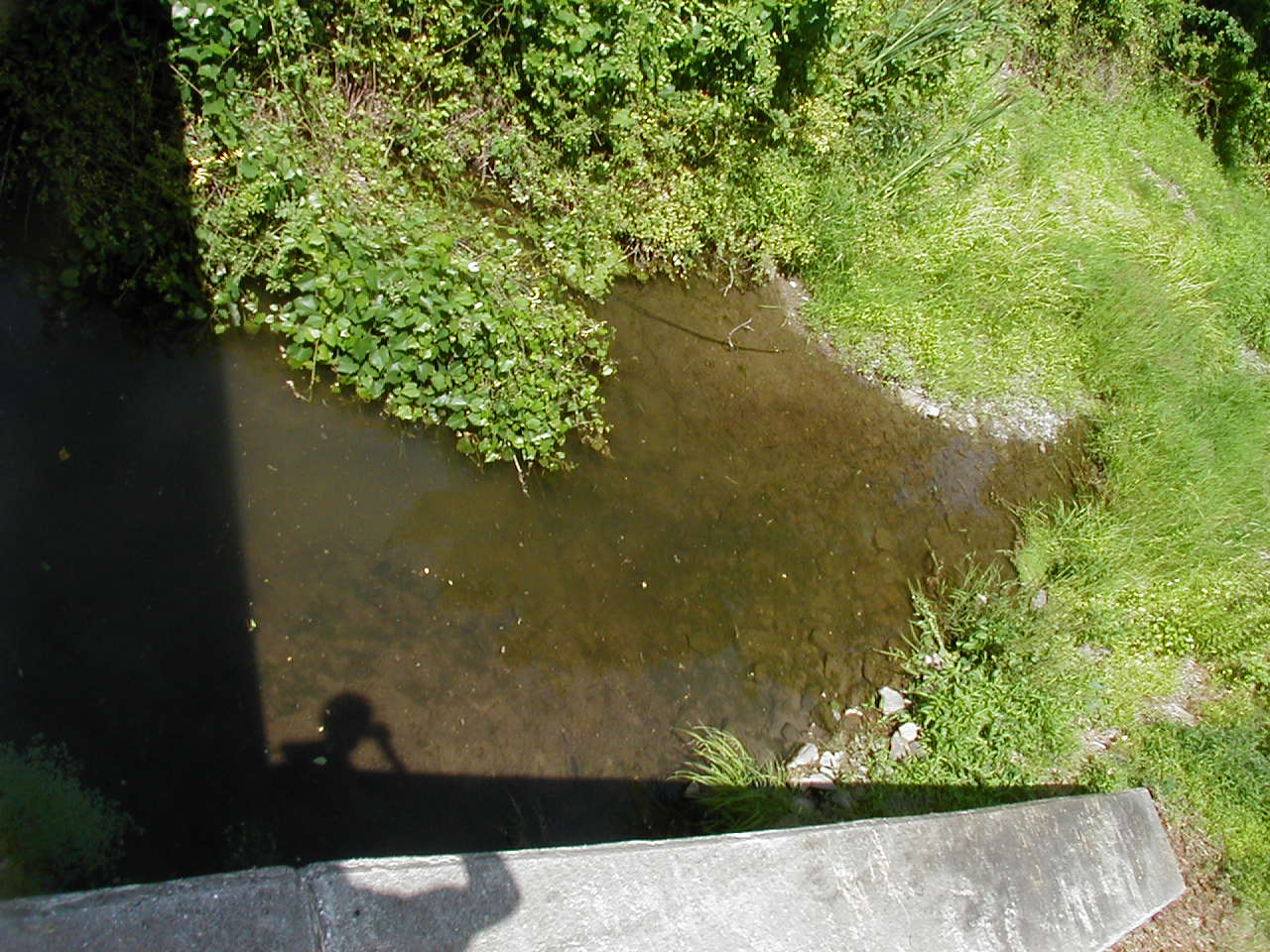
A branch of the Simonson Brook at Ridings Parkway, a deep pool containing many fish

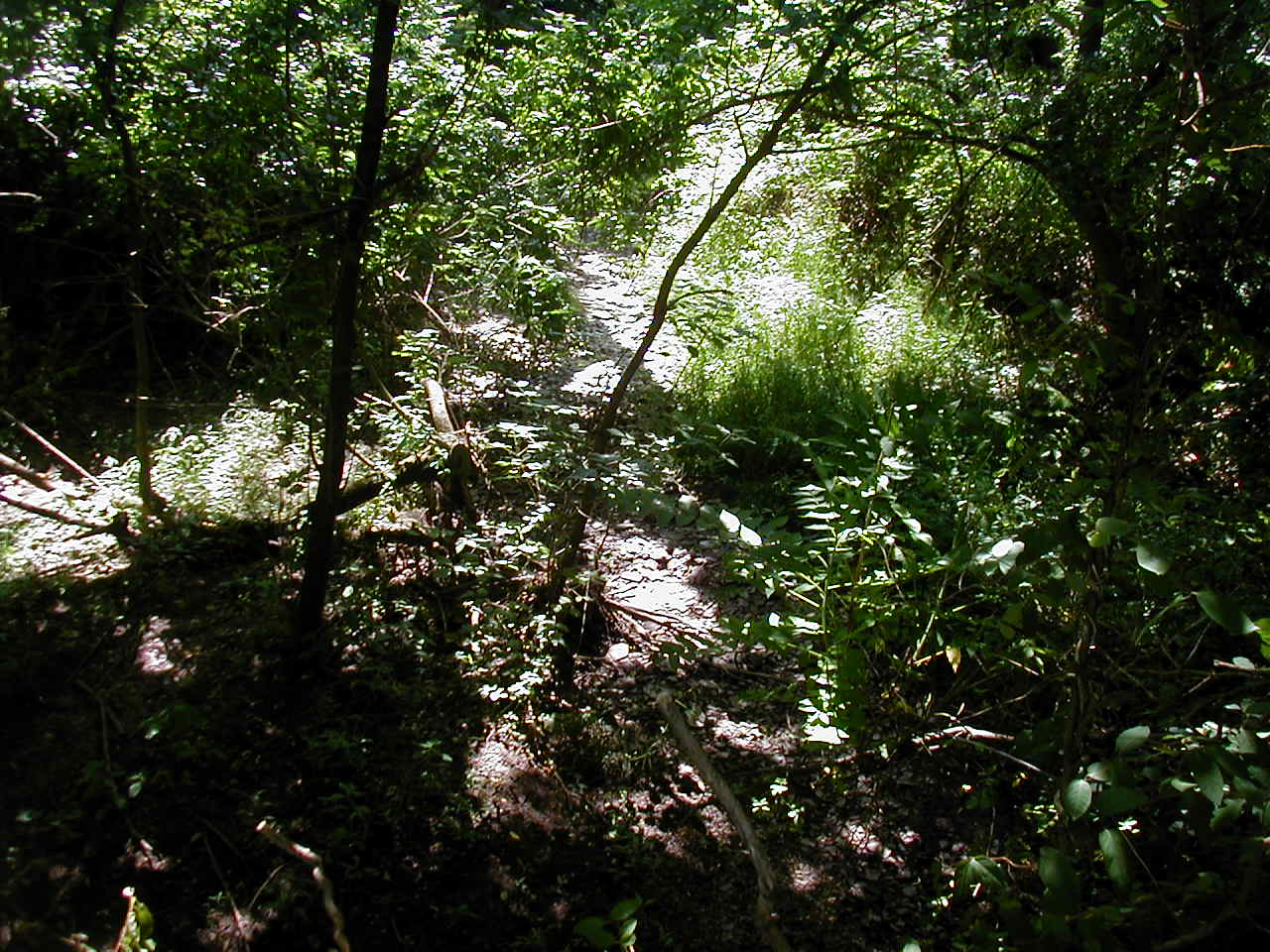
Simonson Brook at Morrison Ave, a dry bed

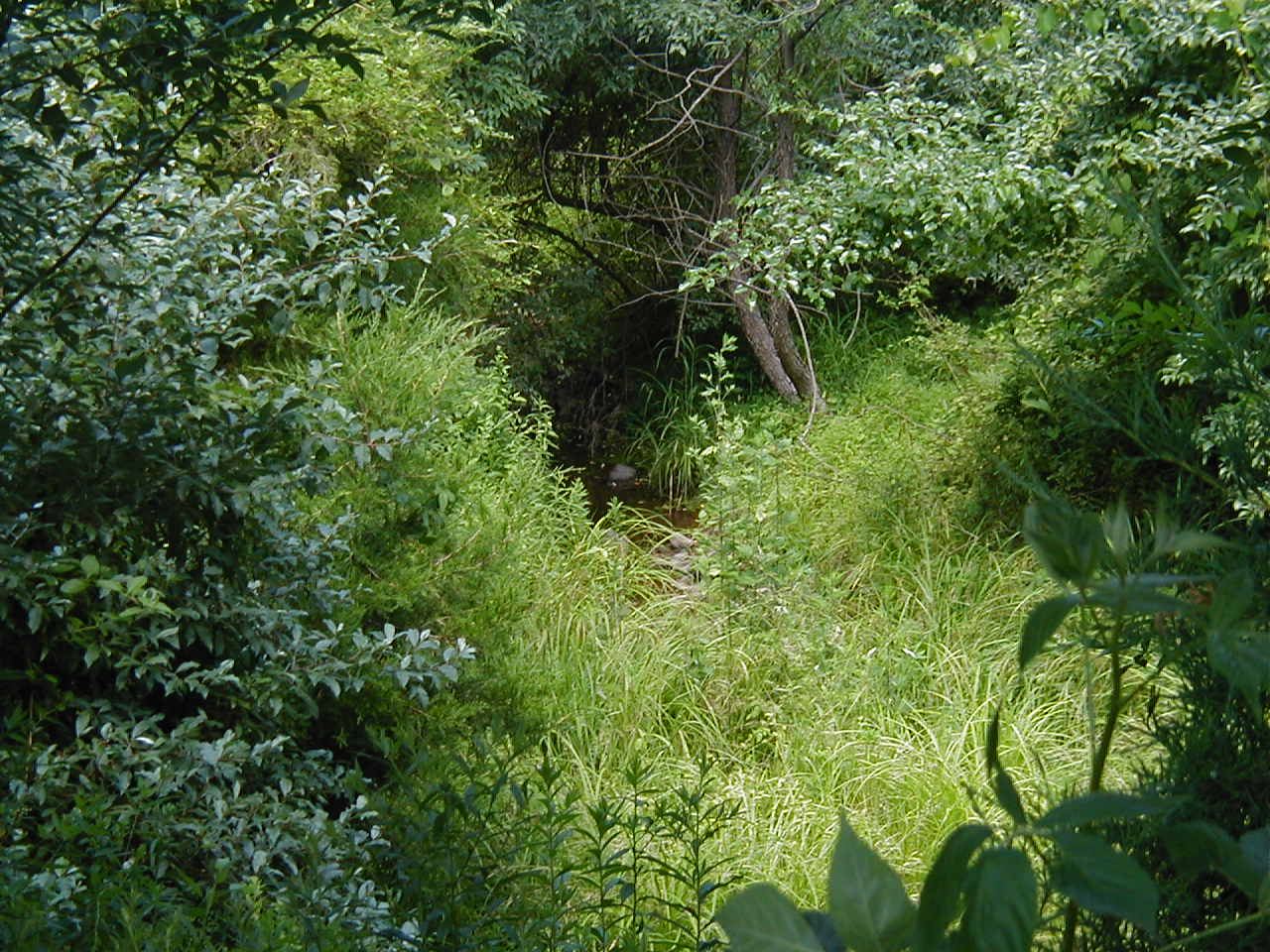
Simonson Brook at Morrison Ave, a small stream flowing through wetlands

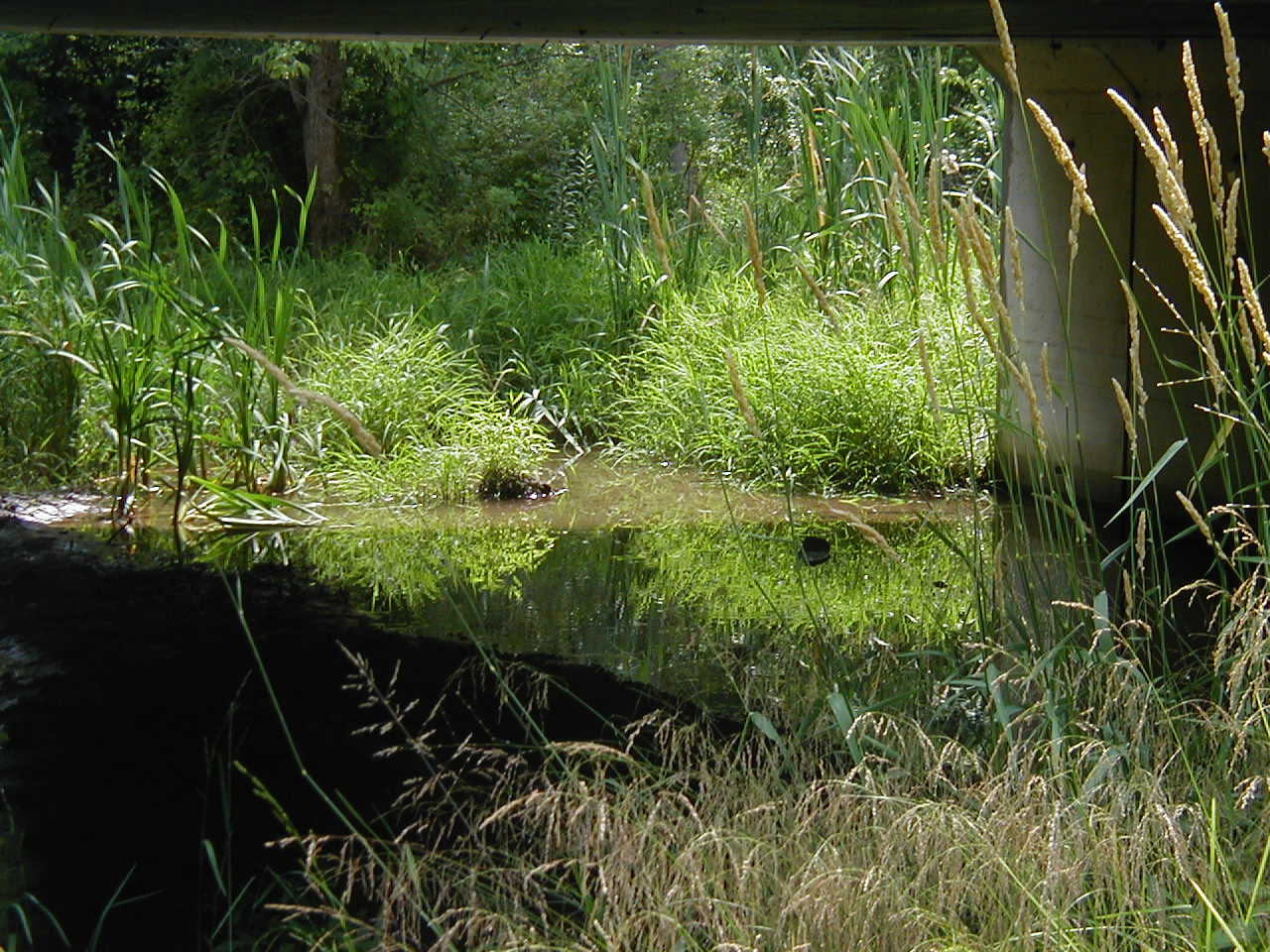
Simonson Brook at Barbieri Court, under a pipe

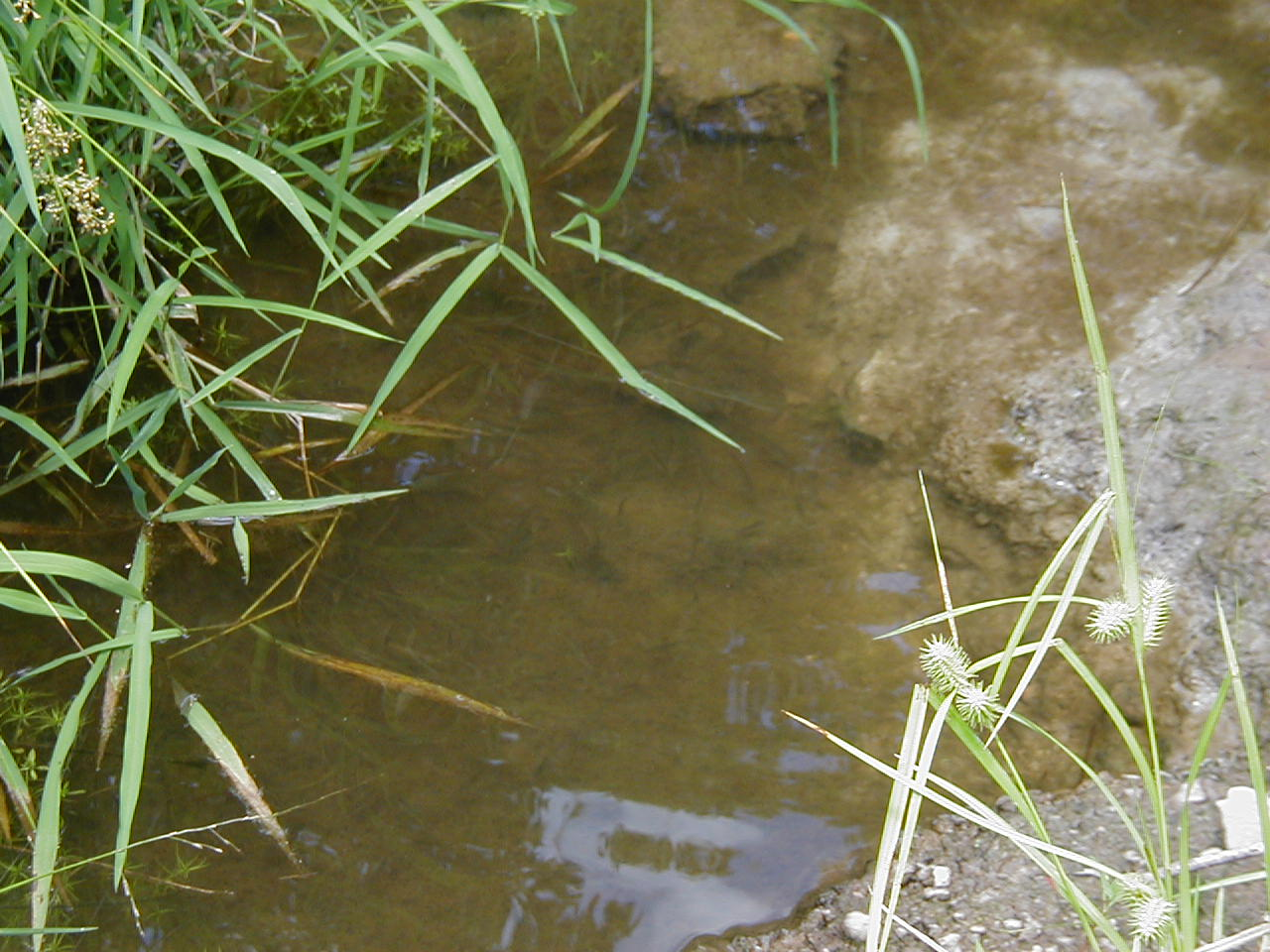
Simonson Brook at Barbieri Court, a small pool where fish live

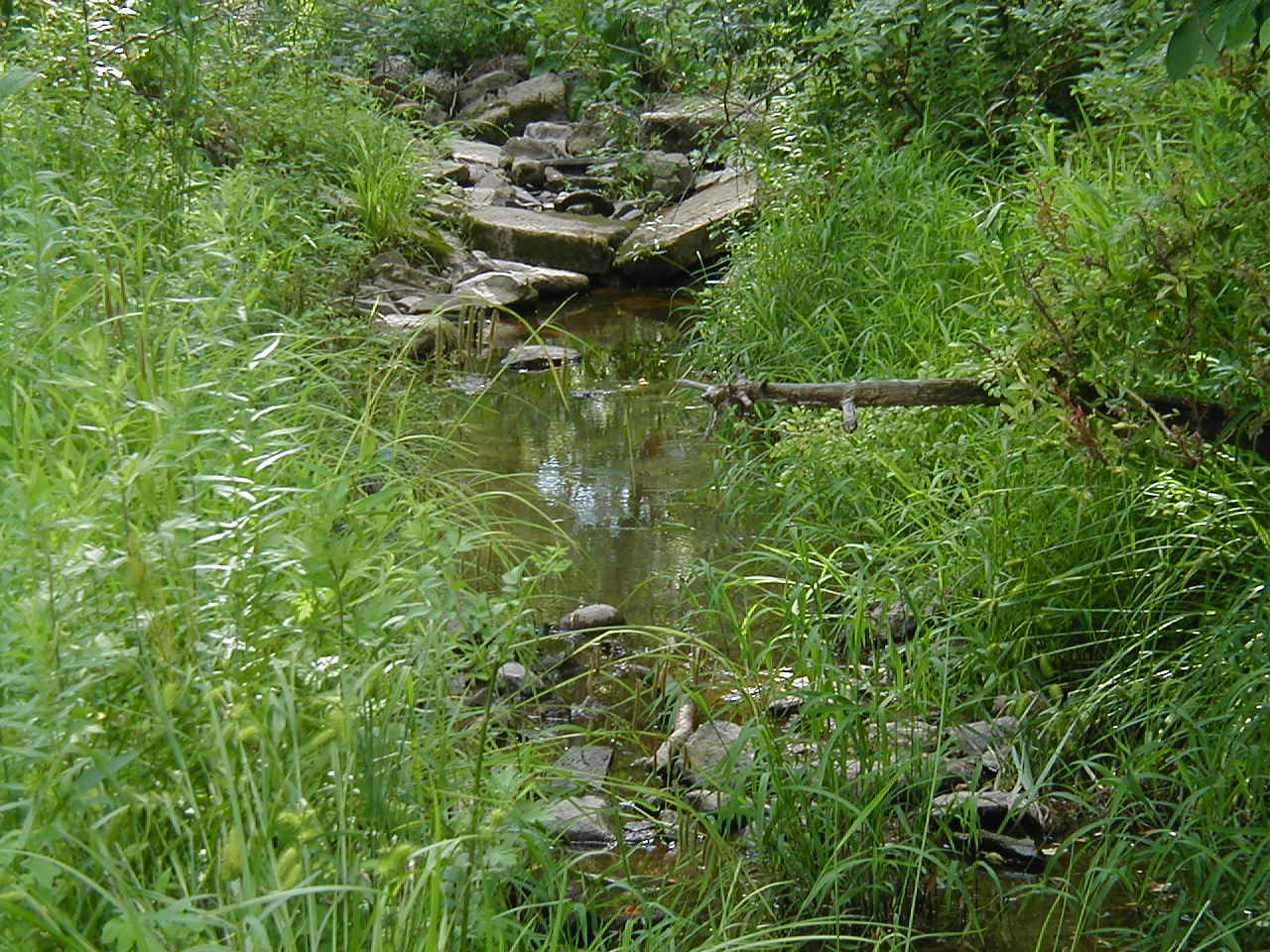
Simonson Brook at Barbieri Court, the drainage of the pool

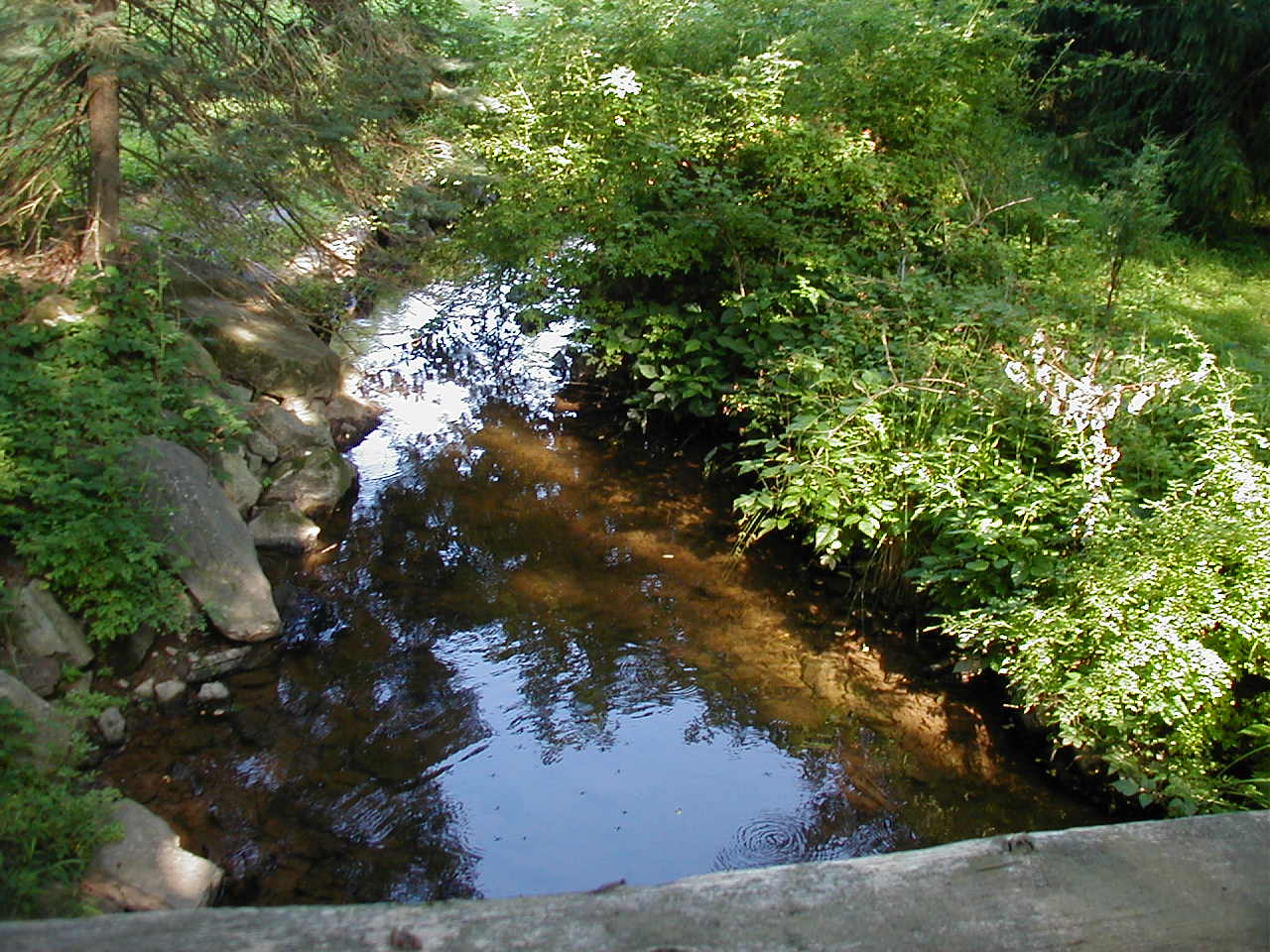
Simonson Brook running through the Bunker Hill Environmental Center

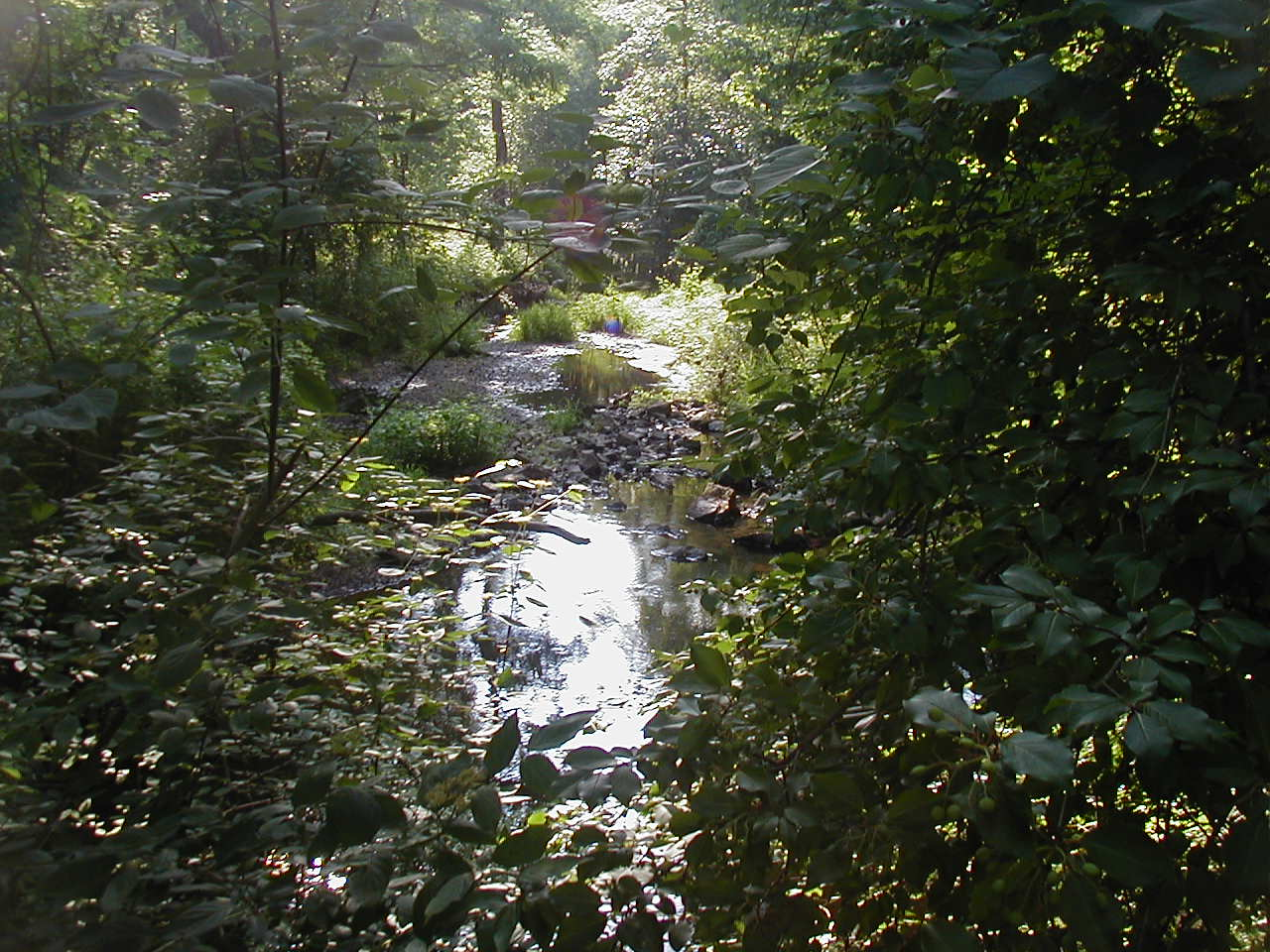
Simonson Brook running through the Bunker Hill Environmental Center

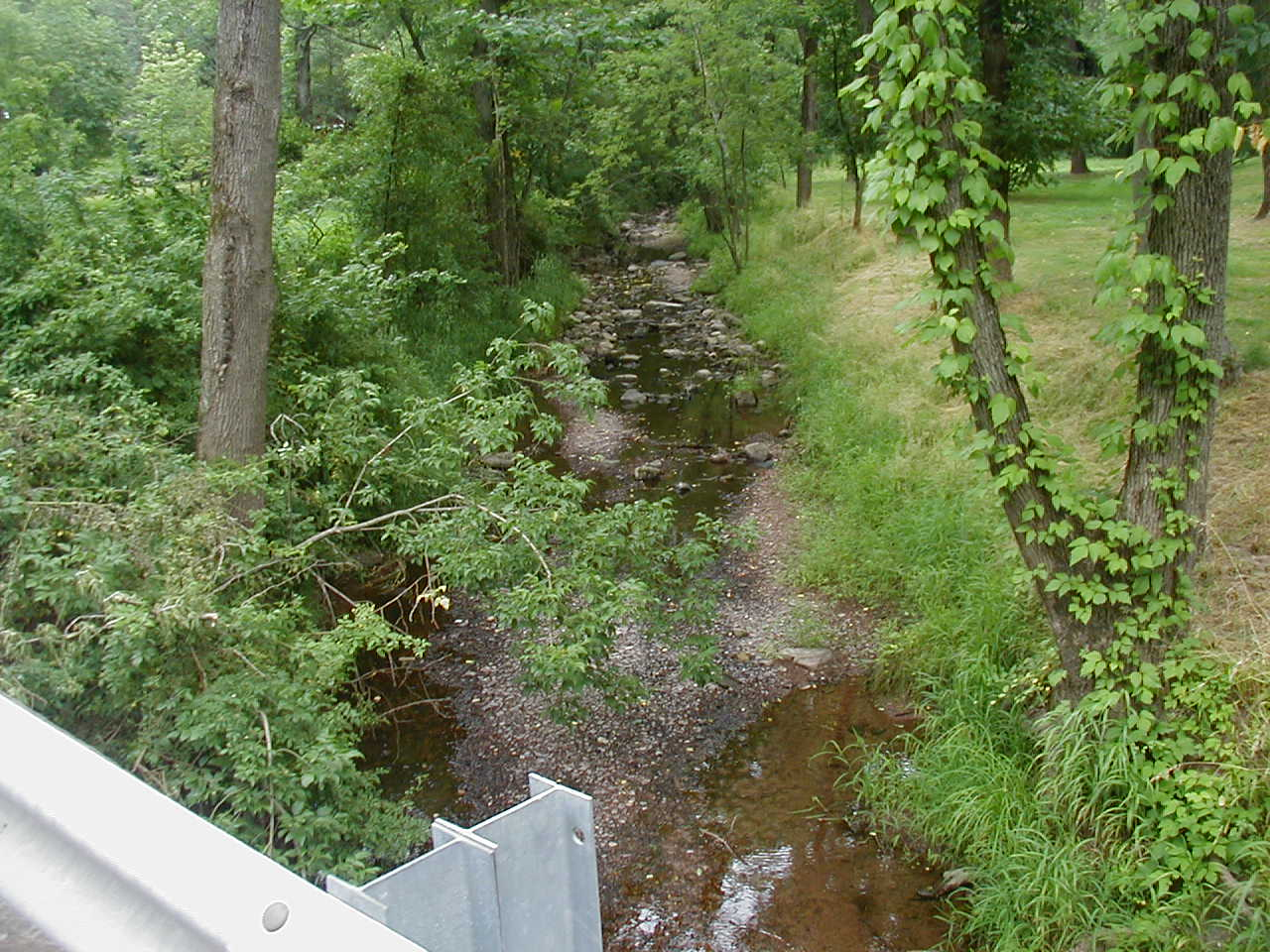
Simonson Brook at Canal Road, facing upstream

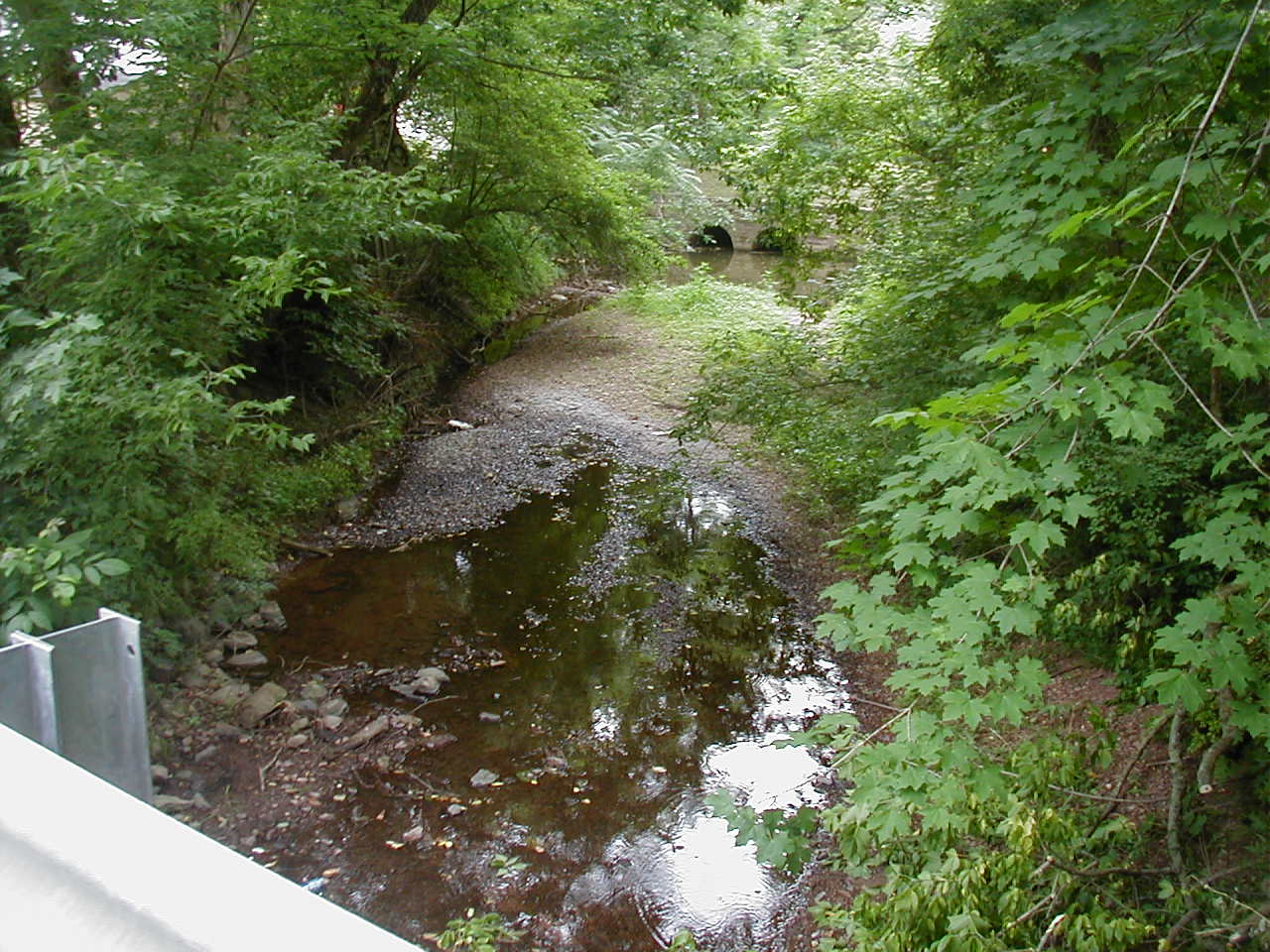
Simonson Brook at Canal Road, facing downstream

== See also ==
- List of rivers of New Jersey
