= Nine Mile Run (New Jersey) =

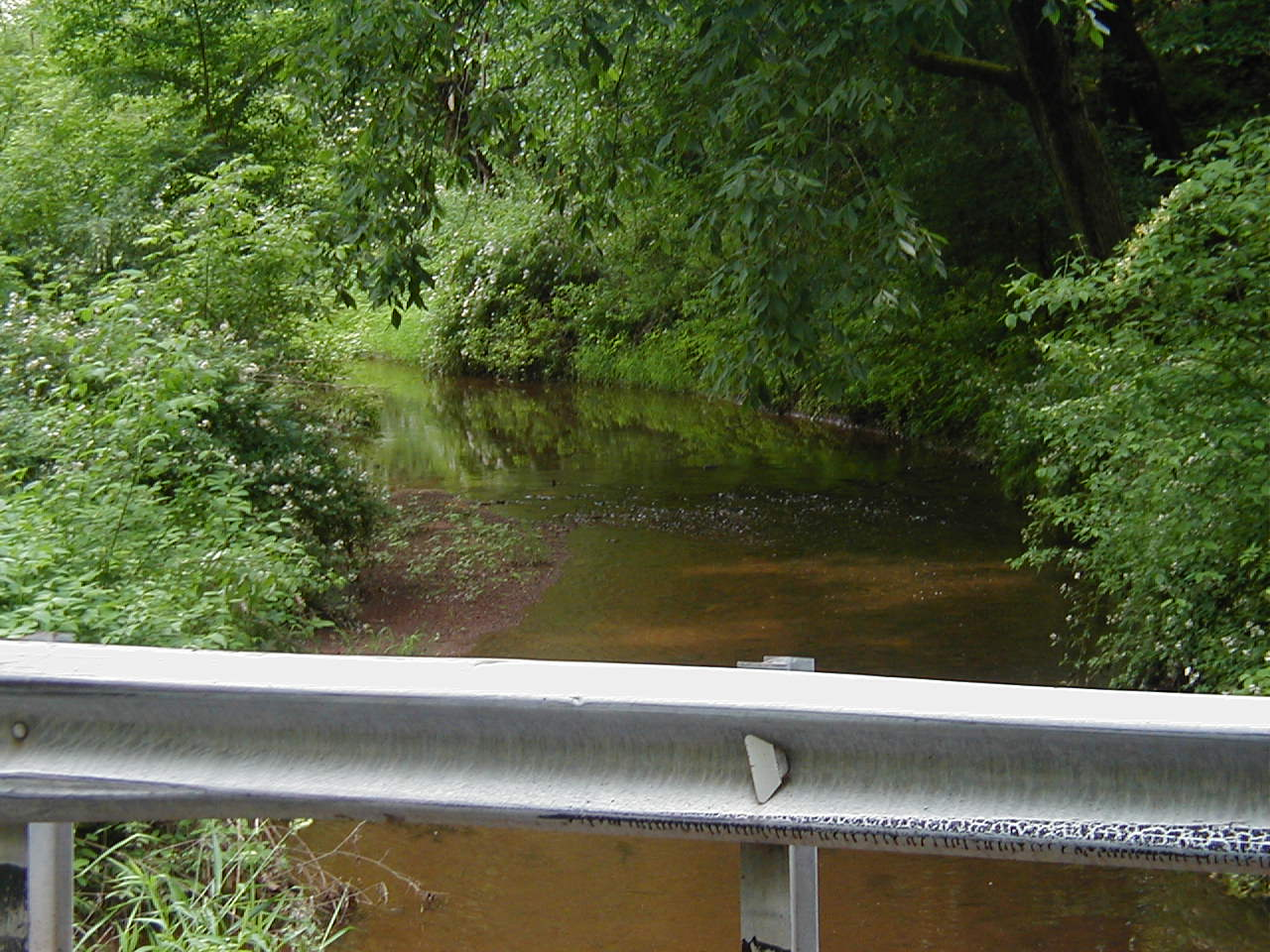
- Nine Mile Run near its mouth

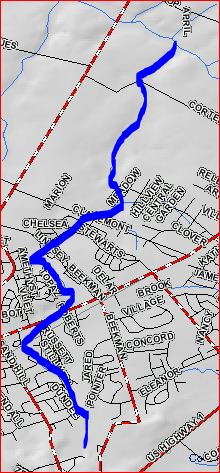
- Map of Nine Mile Run

Location
- Country: United States

Physical characteristics
- Source
  - coordinates: 40°24′51″N 74°32′57″W
- Mouth
  - coordinates: 40°28′00″N 74°32′13″W
  - elevation: 59 ft (18 m)

Basin features
- Progression: Six Mile Run, Millstone River, Raritan River, Atlantic Ocean

Nine Mile Run, known as Ninemile Run according to the USGS GNIS, is a moderately large tributary of the Six Mile Run, one of the branches of the Millstone River, in central New Jersey in the United States.

== Course ==
The official source of the Nine Mile Run is at 40°24′51″N 74°32′57″W. It is found between Sand Hill Rd and Old Beekman Rd in Kendall Park, South Brunswick. Another more visible source, although it is not the official source, is a long narrow marsh beside Sand Hills Road across from the intersection of Stillwell Road and Sand Hills Road.

The stream flows north from the source through a housing development and intersects Route 27 nine miles from where the highway crosses the Raritan River in New Brunswick, hence its name. The crossing on Route 27 is not easy to find because it has been covered with plants and greenery. However, it may be visible as a pipe on the right side of Route 27 in the area across from Stillwell Road when driving south. It can also be seen diagonal to the intersection between Stillwell Road and Route 27. From Route 27, the Nine Mile Run meanders through a wooded area and crosses Beekman Road. It then crosses Claremont Road and travels through the end of a housing development on Bennington Parkway. Continuing north, the stream encounters another wooded area, part of the land set aside for the Six Mile Run Reservoir Site, and crosses Cortelyous Road under a narrow bridge. It then joins the Six Mile Run east of South Middlebush Road in Franklin Township 40°28′00″N 74°32′13″W.

== Animal life ==
The stream is home to tadpoles and several varieties of small fish. It is shallow in many areas, too shallow for large fish to live in. There are occasional deep pools that bigger fish live in. Turtles are sometimes found along the banks or in moist areas. In the marsh farther upstream, there are many frogs and tadpoles, along with a turtle that lives near a deep pool.

== Accessibility ==
The stream is easy in most places to walk through, though the rocks are slippery from underwater plants. It runs in many places through woods with dense brush on either side, making it hard to access in most places.

There are many roads that cross this stream, so accessing it is not a problem.

== Terrain ==
The stream has varying terrain. Upstream, it is a fast flowing small stream with a generally rocky streambed. By Beekman Road, it slows down while still retaining a rocky bottom. Past Bennington Parkway, it gradually becomes more muddy and wide. Near its mouth at Cortelyous Lane, it is very muddy, slow, and wide.

Some sides have steep banks. The banks are composed of shale in certain places. In one location there is a 12 feet (3.7 m) high shale cliff. It is dangerous to climb because the shale is very crumbly. Some areas have natural floors composed of rock polished smooth by the stream's abrasive action.

Several tributaries feed this stream, and they have varied terrain. One that drains a pond near Claremont Road is very muddy and home to frogs. Another one that drains springs near Bennington Parkway is rocky and contains several fish.

== Sister tributaries ==
- Cross Brook
- Steep Hill Brook
- Middlebush Brook

== Gallery ==
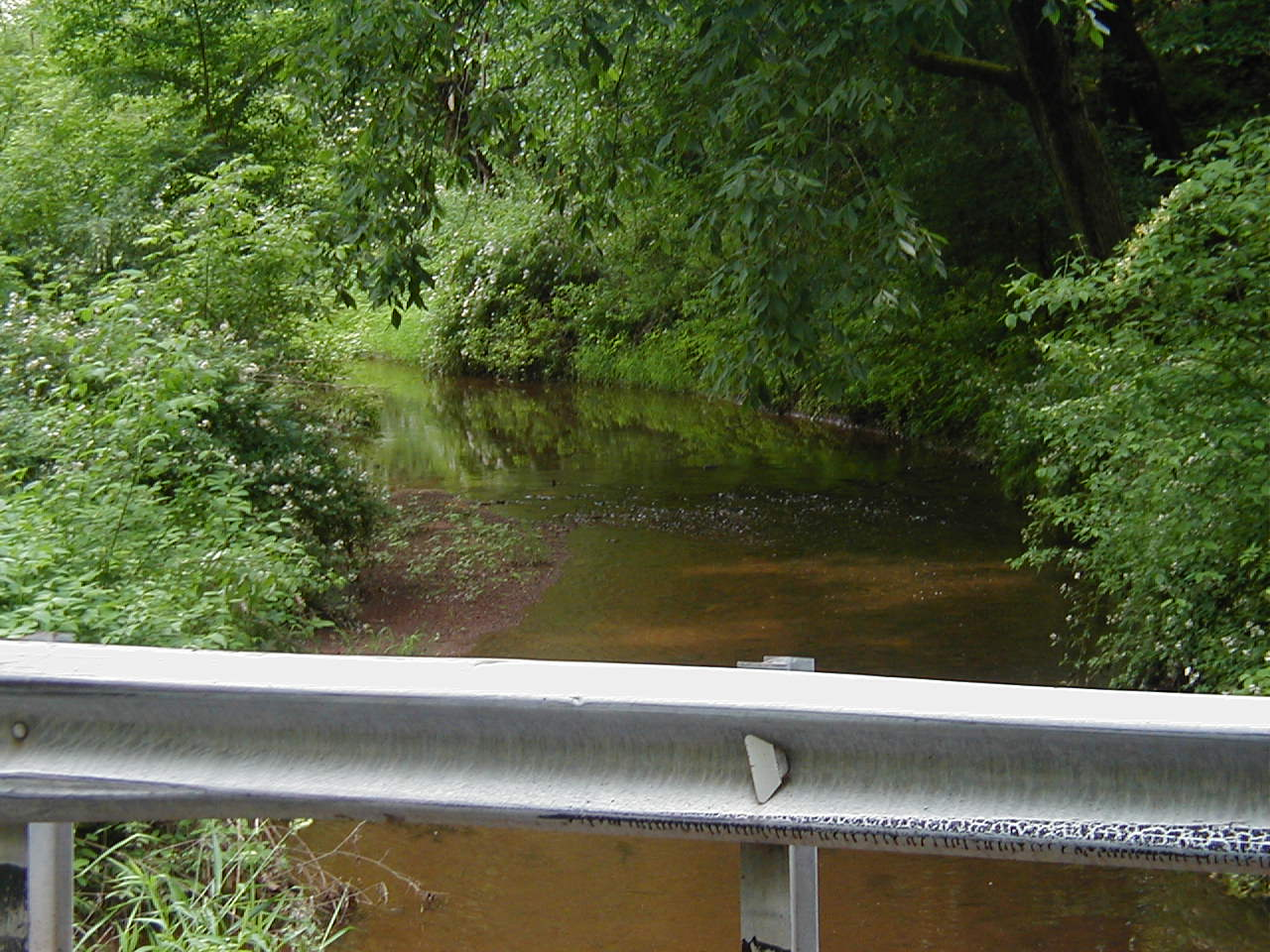
Nine Mile Run at Cortelyous Road, just before its mouth

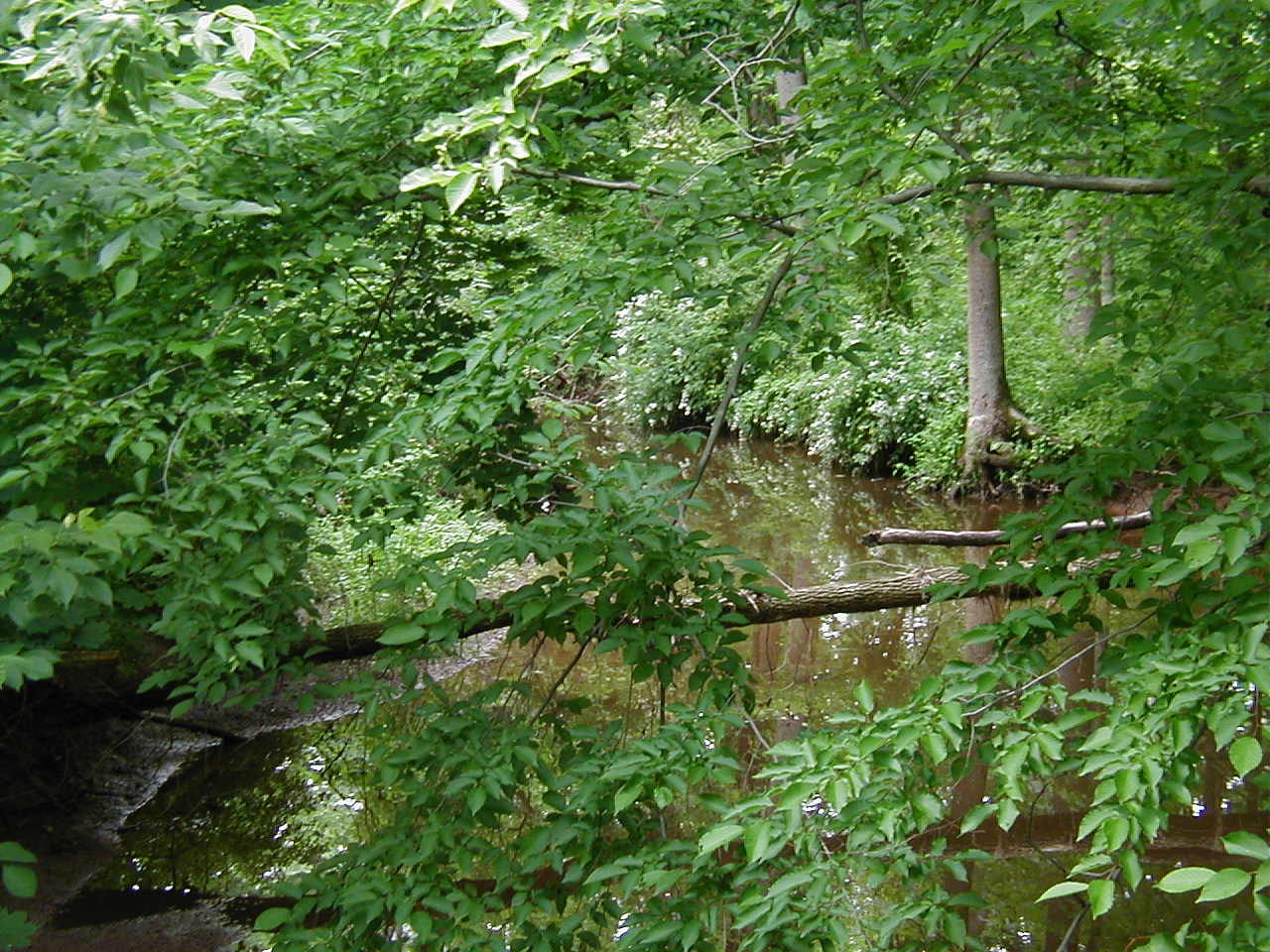
Nine Mile Run at Cortelyous Road, just before its mouth

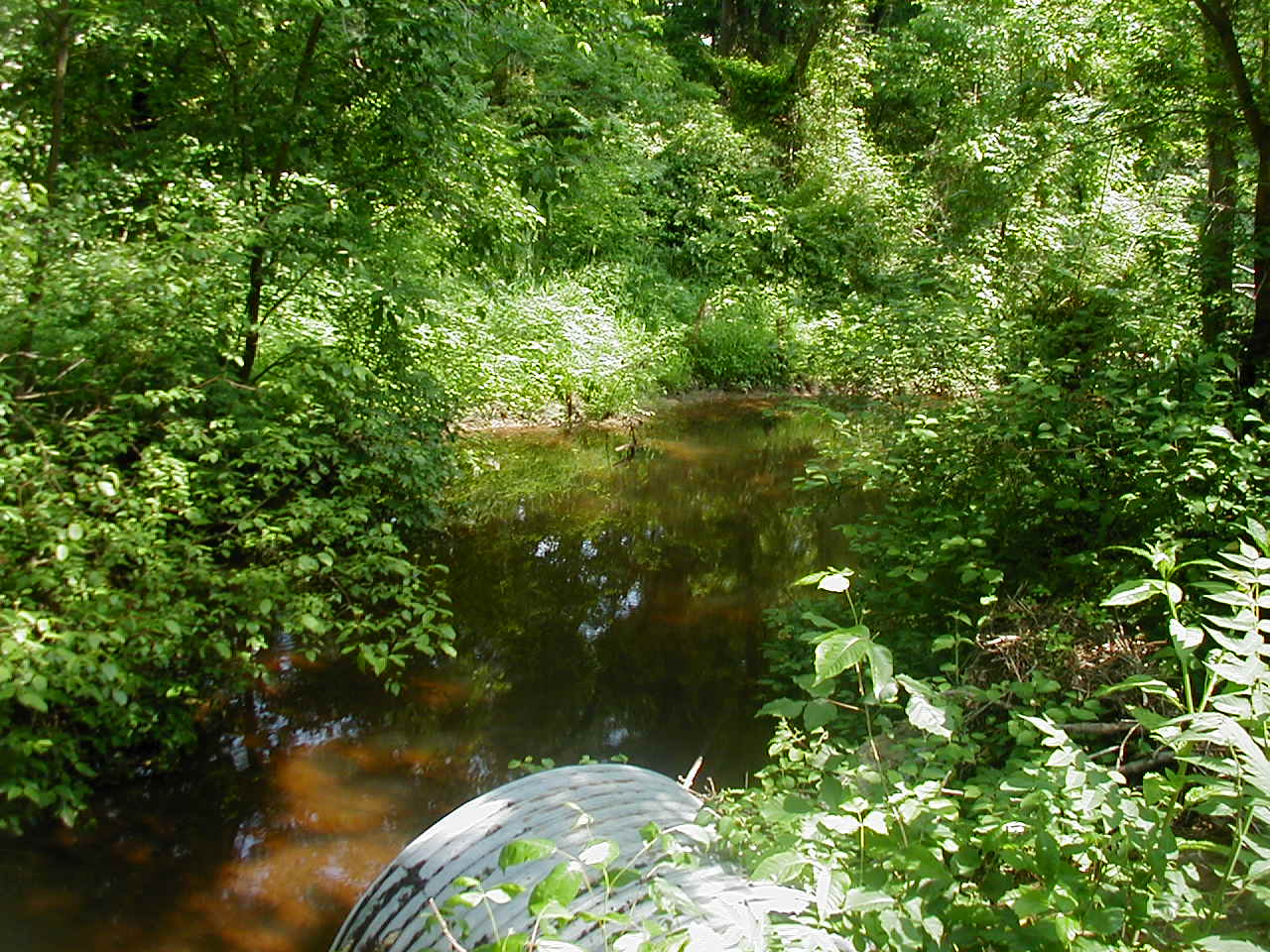
Nine Mile Run at the end of a housing development

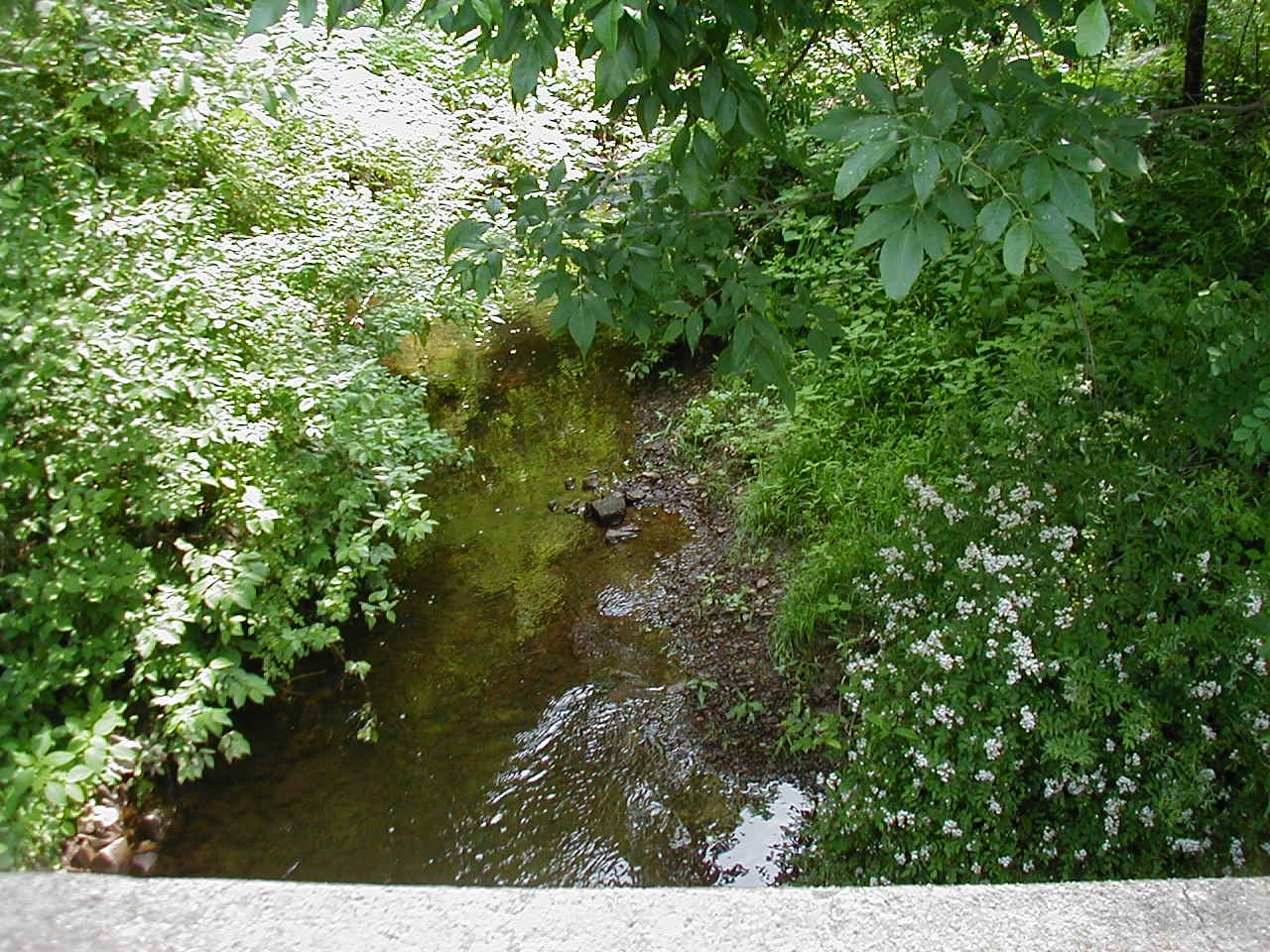
Nine Mile Run crossing Claremont Road

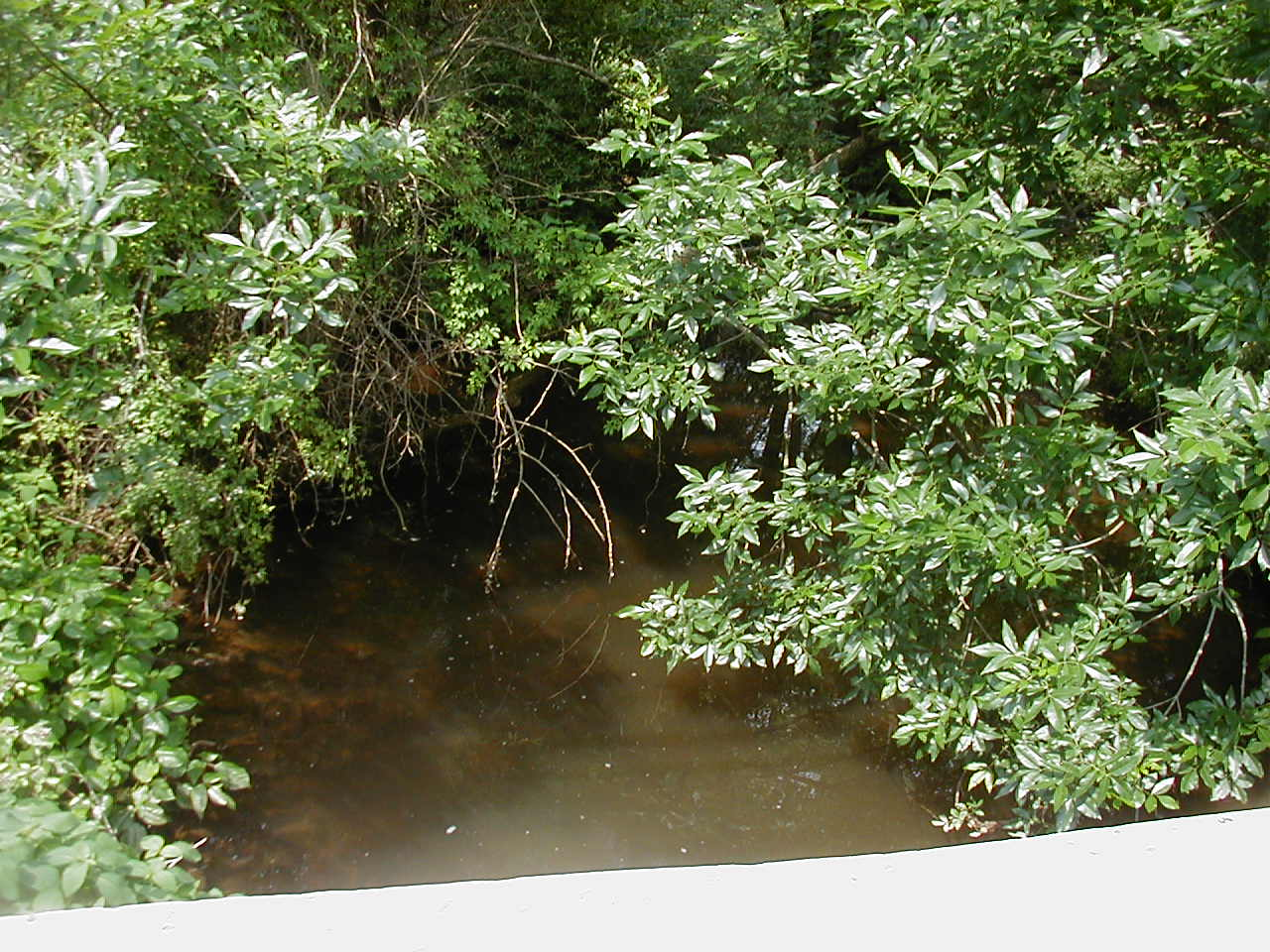
Nine Mile Run crossing Claremont Road

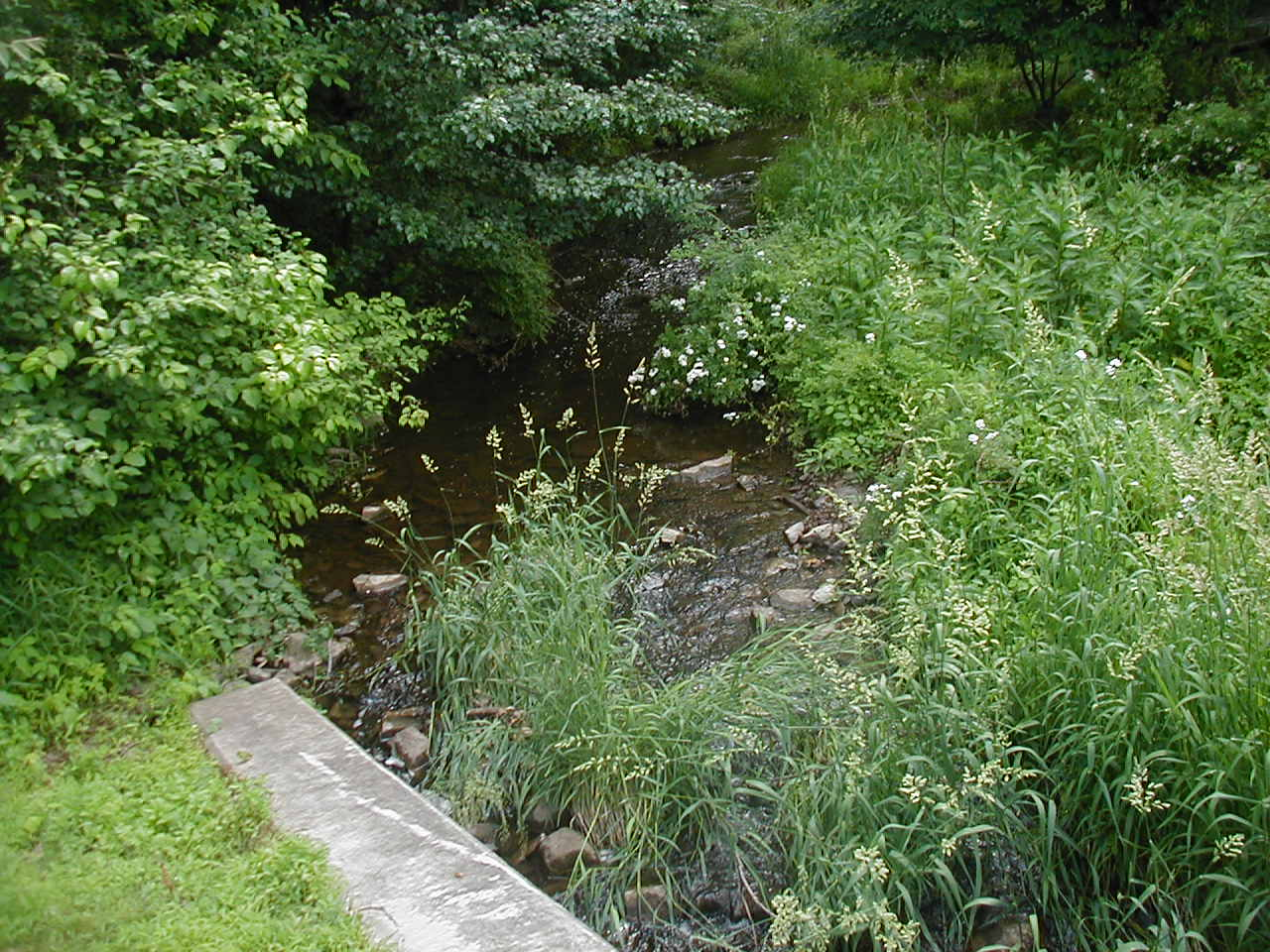
Nine Mile Run crossing Beekman Road

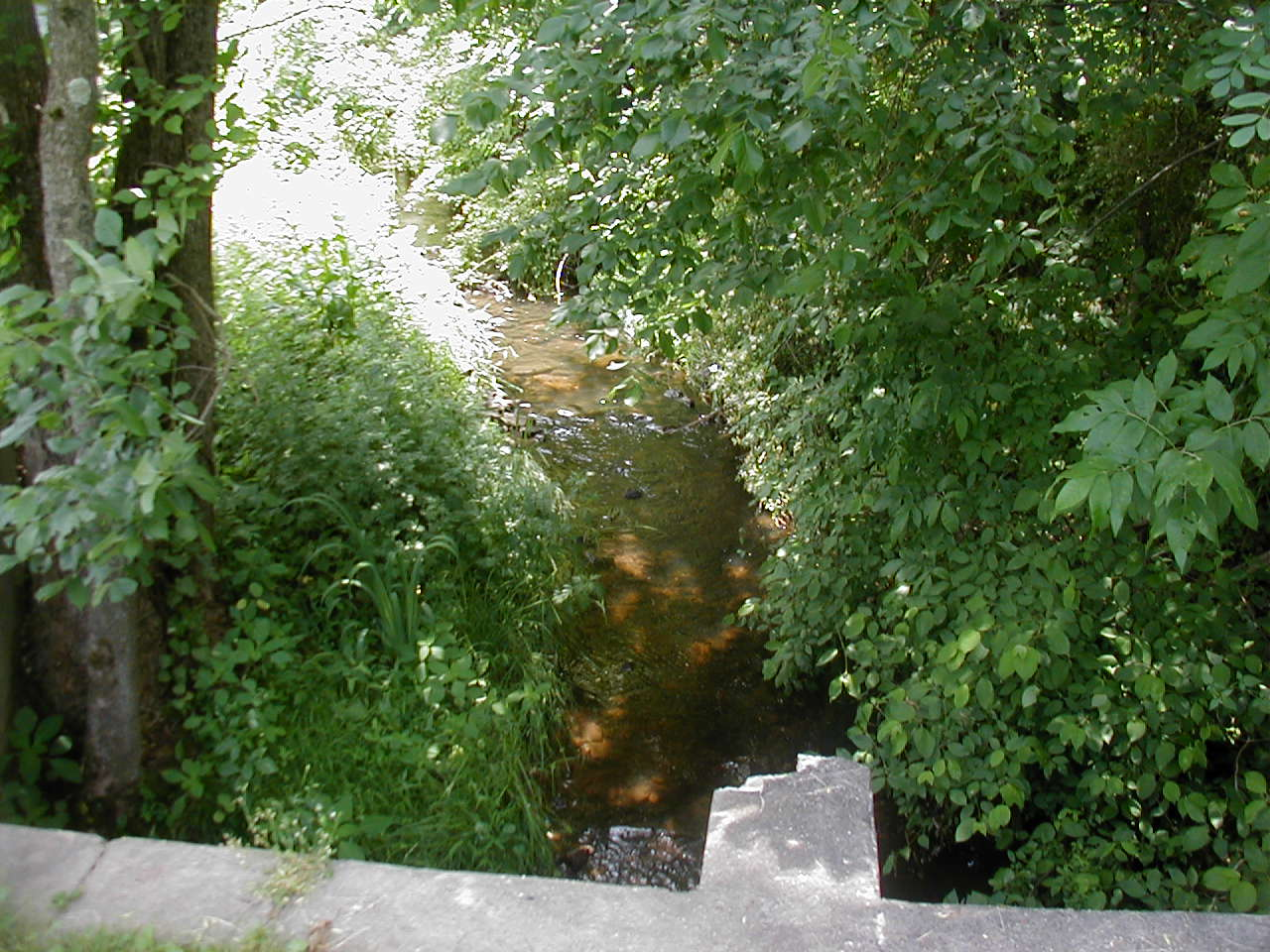
Nine Mile Run crossing Route 27

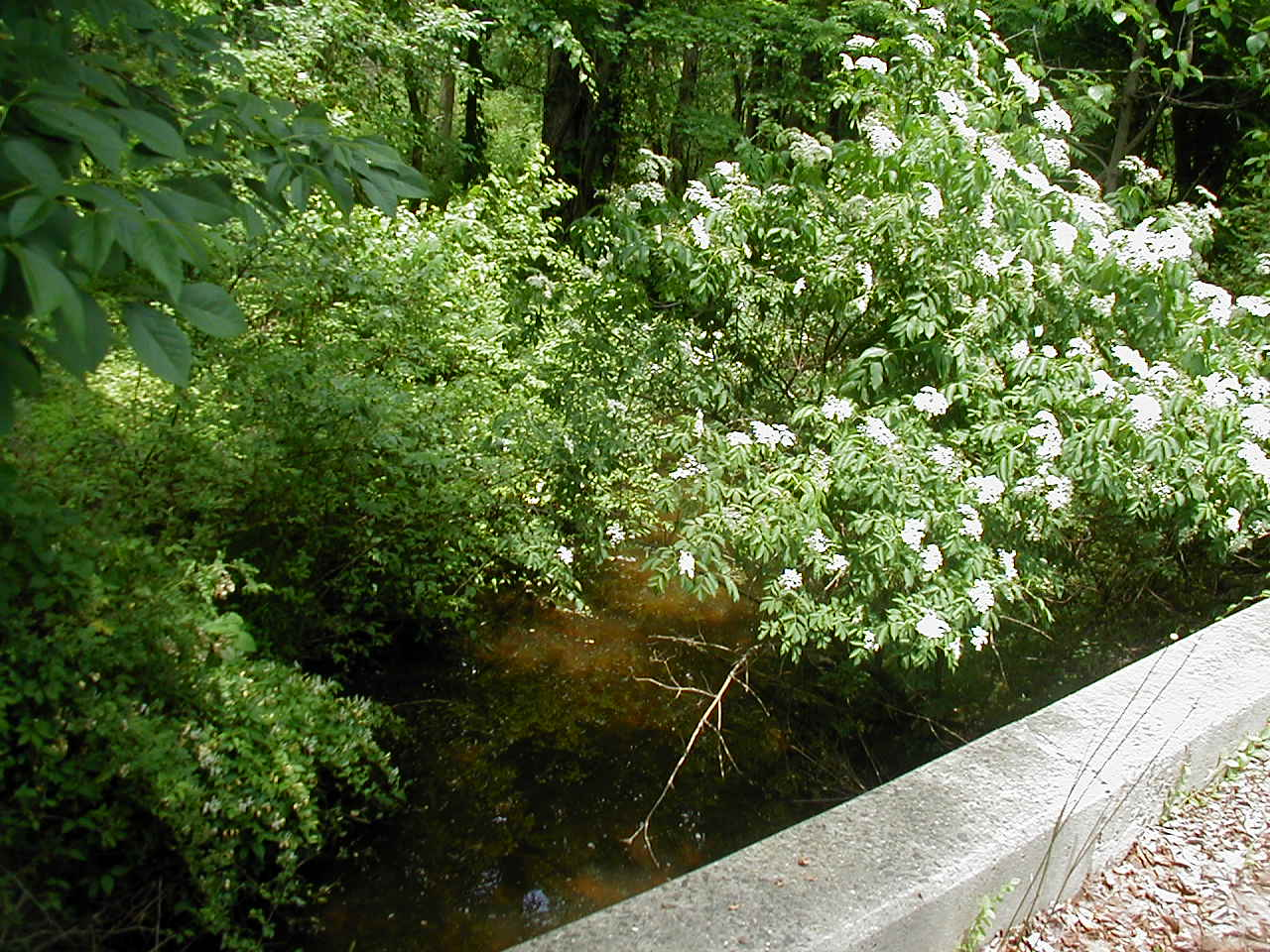
Nine Mile Run crossing Route 27

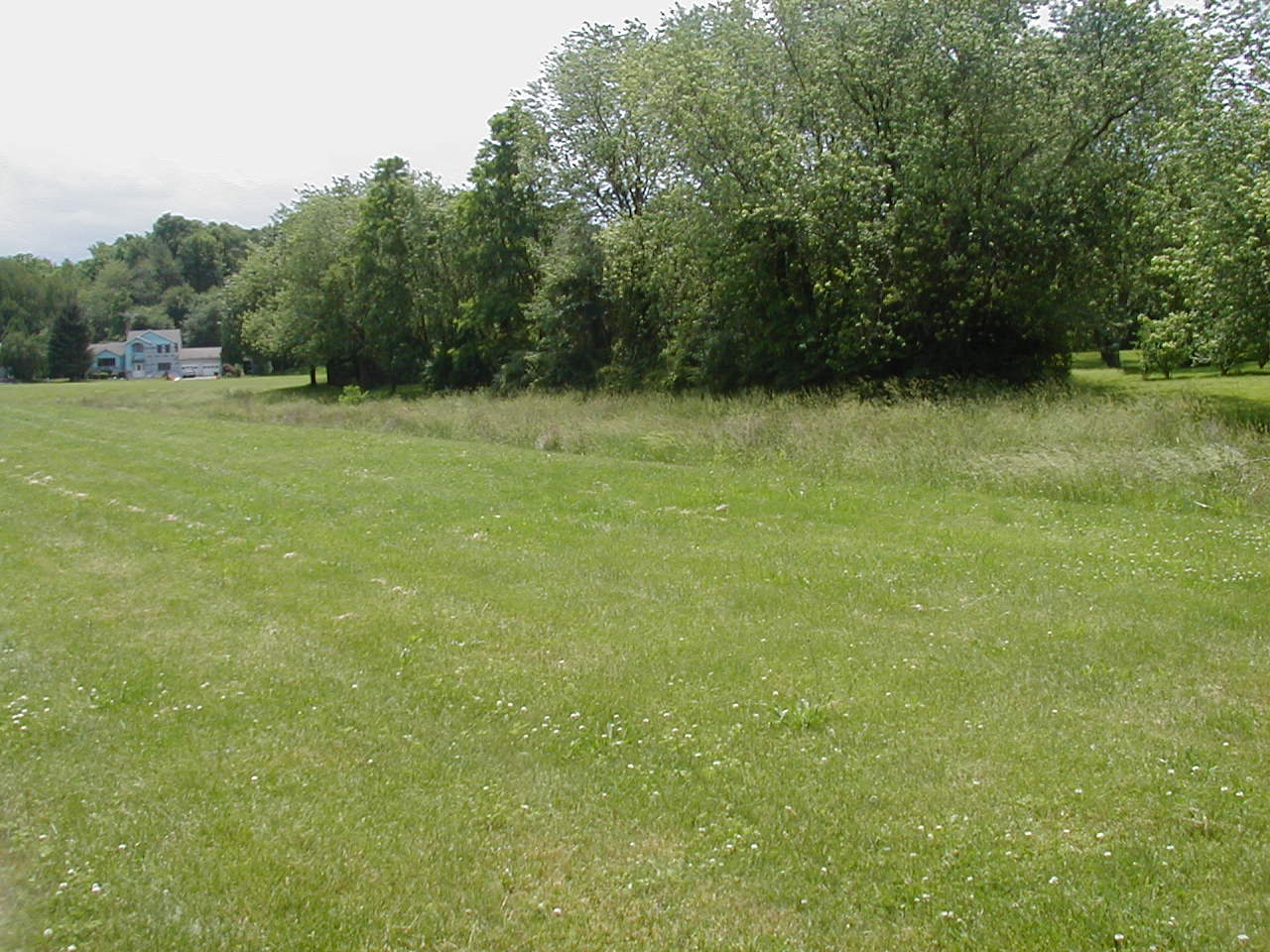
A marsh, one of the sources of the Nine Mile Run

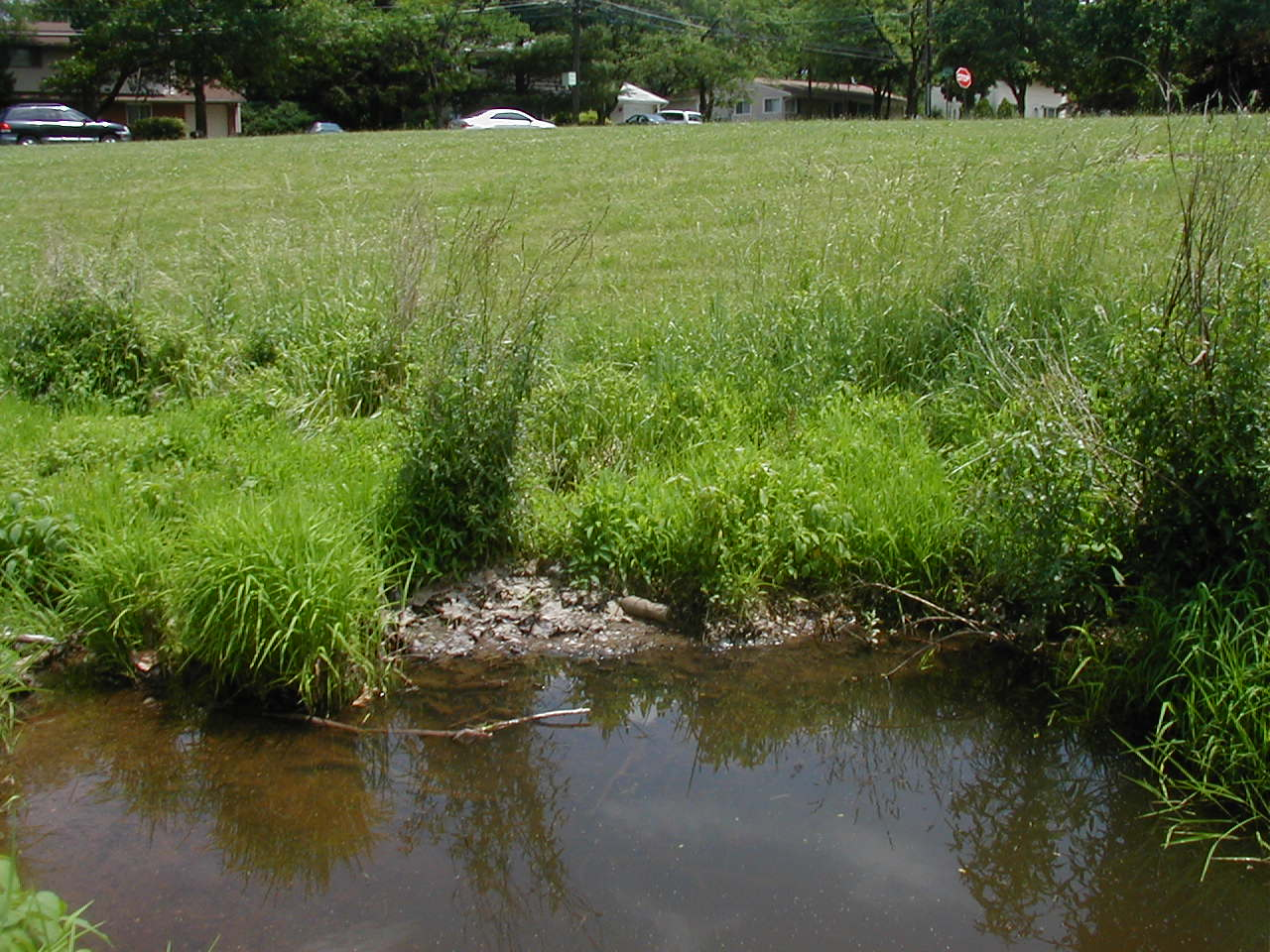
A pool of water at a marsh, one of the sources of the Nine Mile Run

== See also ==
- List of rivers of New Jersey
