= Six Mile =

Six Mile and Sixmile may refer to:

== Communities ==
- Sixmile (Bibb county), Alabama
- Six Mile (Morgan County), Alabama
- Six Mile, Georgia
- Six Mile, South Carolina, Pickens County
- Six Mile Township, Franklin County, Illinois
- Six Mile Bottom, England
- Six Mile Grove Township, Swift County, Minnesota
- Six Mile, Papua New Guinea
- Six Mile, Lae, Papua New Guinea
- Hayden, Indiana, also known as Six Mile

== Other ==
- Six Mile Water, a river in Northern Ireland
- Six Mile Bottom railway station, England
- Six Mile Grove, a band

== See also ==
- Six Mile Creek (disambiguation)
- Six Mile Island (disambiguation)
- Six Mile Lake (disambiguation)
- Six Mile Run (disambiguation)
