= Six Mile Run =

Six Mile Run may refer to the following in the U.S. state of New Jersey:

- Six Mile Run (New Jersey), a tributary of the Millstone River
- Six Mile Run, New Jersey, several different but related features in Franklin Township
- Six Mile Run Reformed Church, a Dutch Reformed church listed on the NRHP in Somerset County
- Six Mile Run Reservoir Site, part of the Delaware and Raritan Canal State Park
- Franklin Park, New Jersey, a community once known as Six Mile Run

== See also ==
- Six Mile Creek (disambiguation)
