= Franklin Park, New Jersey (disambiguation) =

Franklin Park, New Jersey may refer to:

- Franklin Park, New Jersey, census-designated place within Franklin Township, Somerset County
- Franklin Park, Middlesex County, New Jersey, adjacent to the first Franklin Park in North Brunswick and South Brunswick townships, Middlesex County
- Franklin Park, Trenton, New Jersey, unrelated to the first two, located in the city of Trenton, Mercer County
