= Steep Hill Brook (New Jersey) =

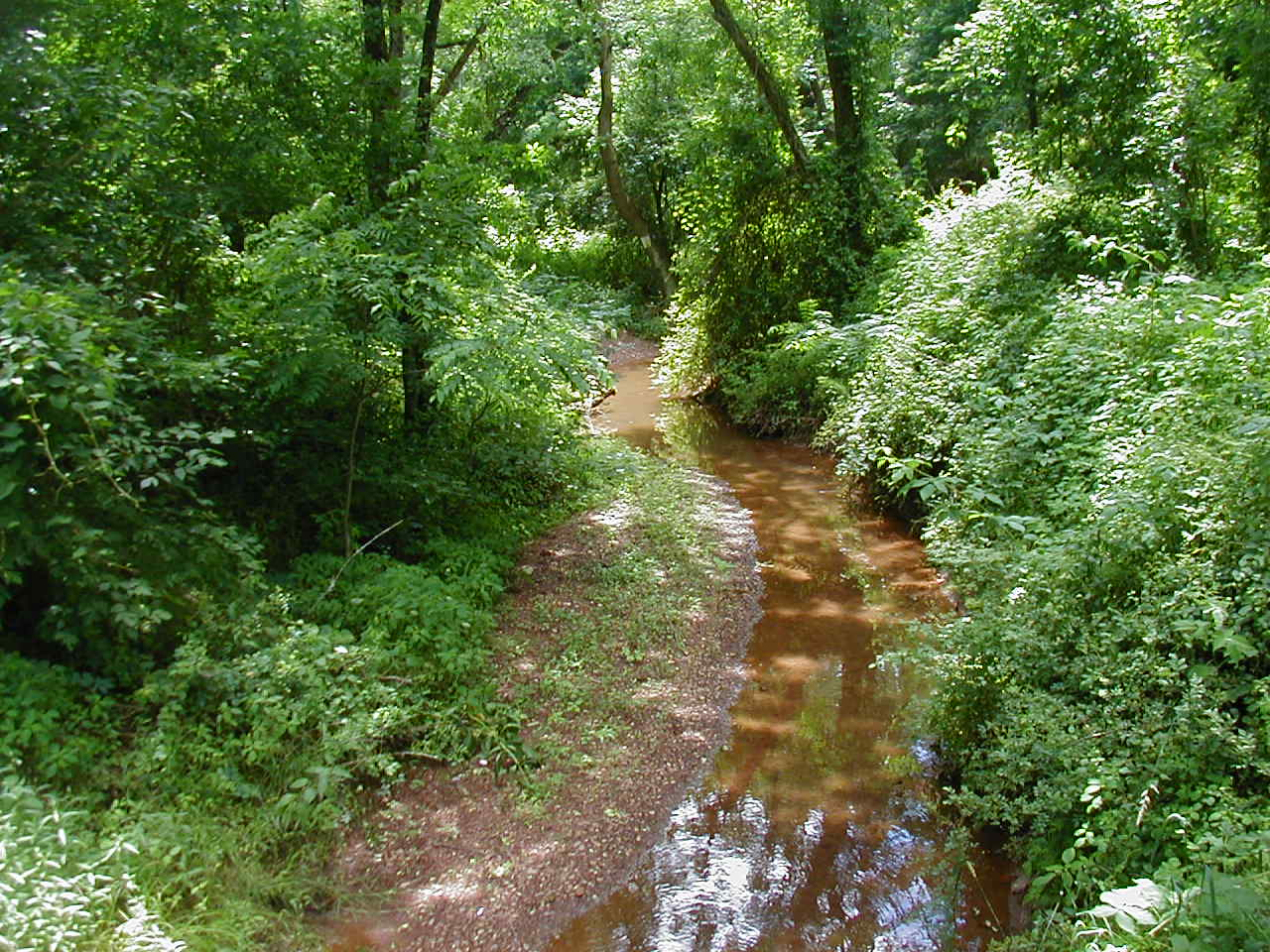
- Steep Hill Brook viewed from Blackwells Mills Road

Location
- Country: United States

Physical characteristics
- Source
  - coordinates: 40°29′43″N 74°32′41″W
- Mouth
  - coordinates: 40°28′24″N 74°33′32″W
  - elevation: 56 ft (17 m)

Basin features
- Progression: Six Mile Run, Millstone River, Raritan River, Atlantic Ocean
- River system: Raritan River system

Steep Hill Brook is a tributary of Six Mile Run in central and north central Franklin Park, Somerset County, New Jersey in the United States.

== Course ==
Steep Hill Brook's source is at 40°29′43″N 74°32′41″W, in a pond near the intersection of Amwell Road and Van Cleef Road. It starts in Scott Farm, a local farm bordering Van Cleef Road and Amwell Road. It flows south into the Six Mile Run Reservoir Site, a preserved area around Six Mile Run. It crosses Blackwells Mills Road and drains into Six Mile Run at 40°28′24″N 74°33′32″W.

== Accessibility ==
Steep Hill Brook is a rather short stream. It only crosses one road, Blackwells Mills Road, where it is easily accessible on one side. It can be accessed by some trails in the woods too.

== Animal life ==
Steep Hill Brook has many fish, as they prefer the oxygenated environment. There are several frogs in the slow moving places, although the fine gravel is less hospitable to them than mud.

== Terrain ==
The streambed of Steep Hill Brook is composed of fine reddish gravel in most places. Some shale cliffs may be found along its banks. This stream is generally medium-fast flowing and shallow. "Sandbars" formed by accumulation of gravel are common. Short stalactites may be found growing at the bridge at Blackwells Mills Road.

== Sister tributaries ==
- Cross Brook
- Nine Mile Run
- Middlebush Brook

== Gallery ==
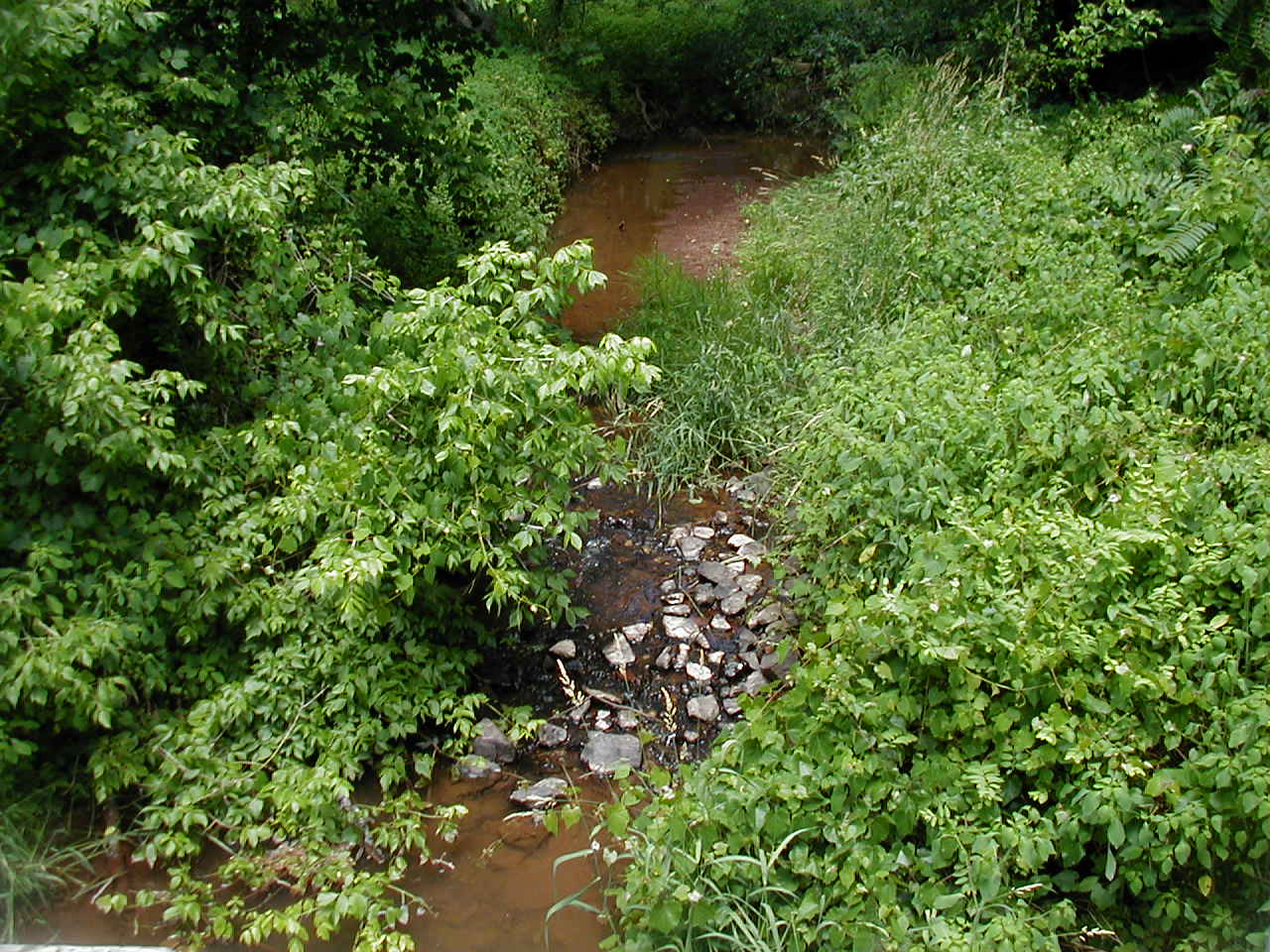
Steep Hill Brook Crossing Blackwells Mills Road

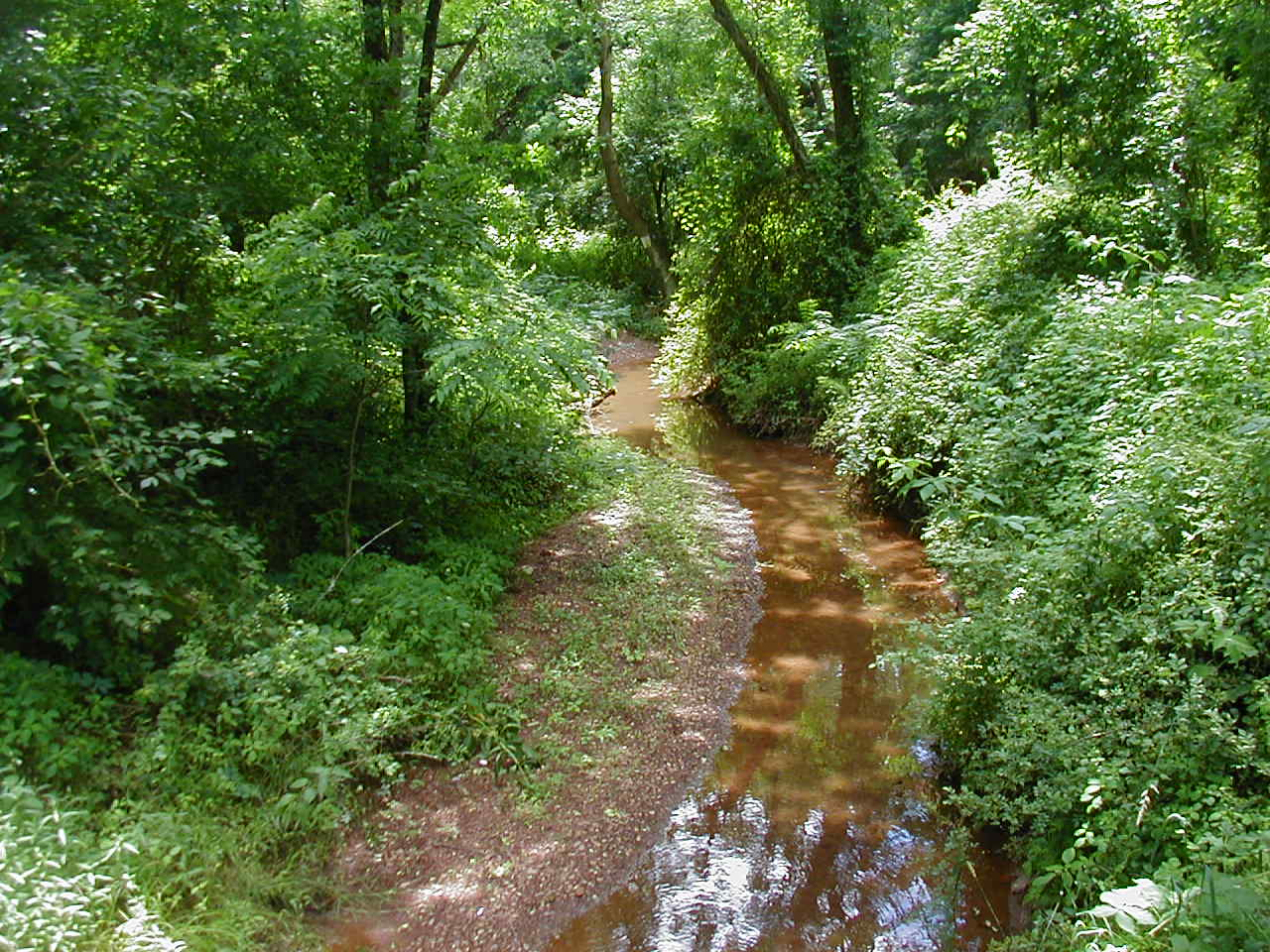
Steep Hill Brook Crossing Blackwells Mills Road

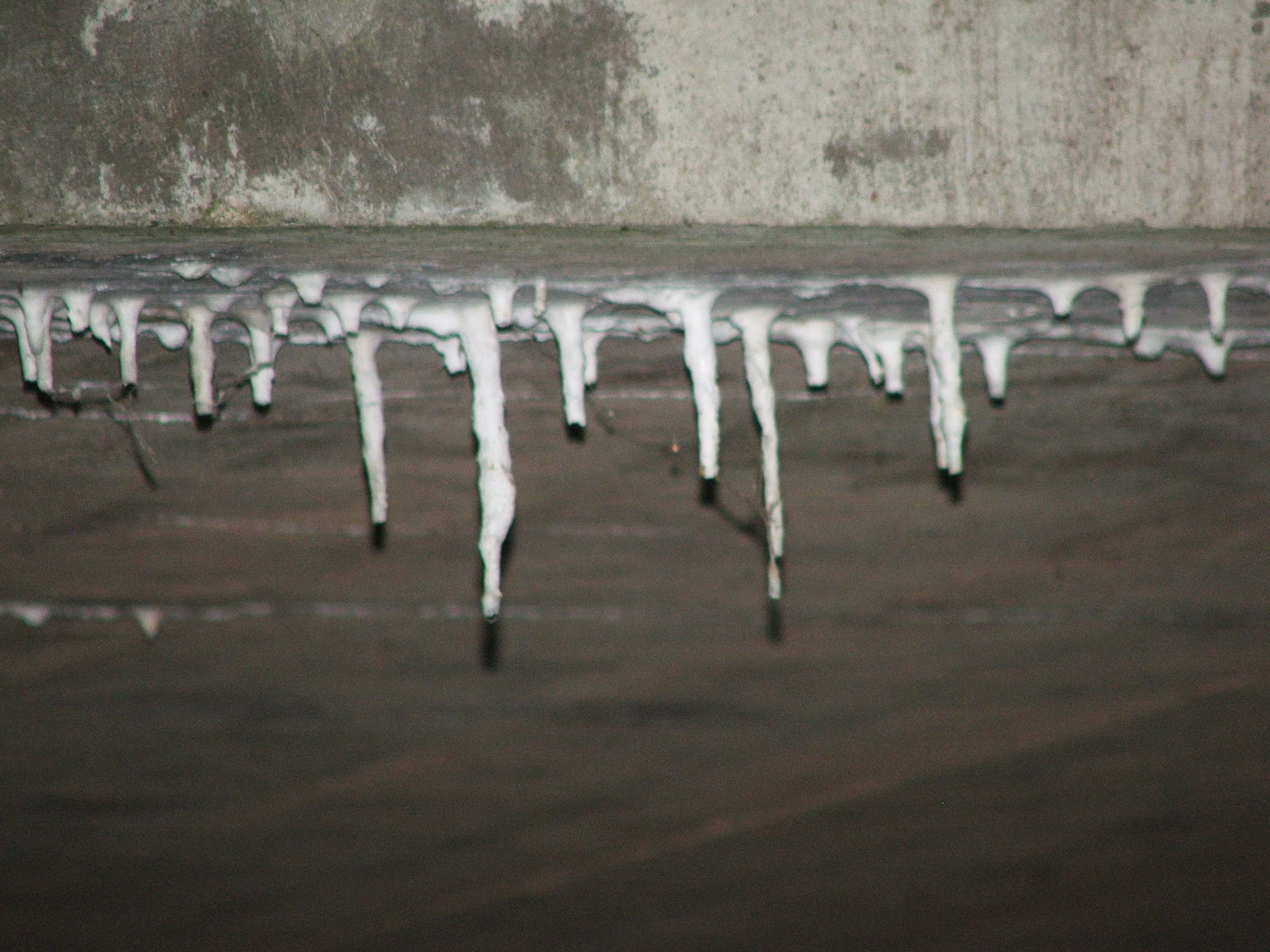
Stalactites at Steep Hill Brook

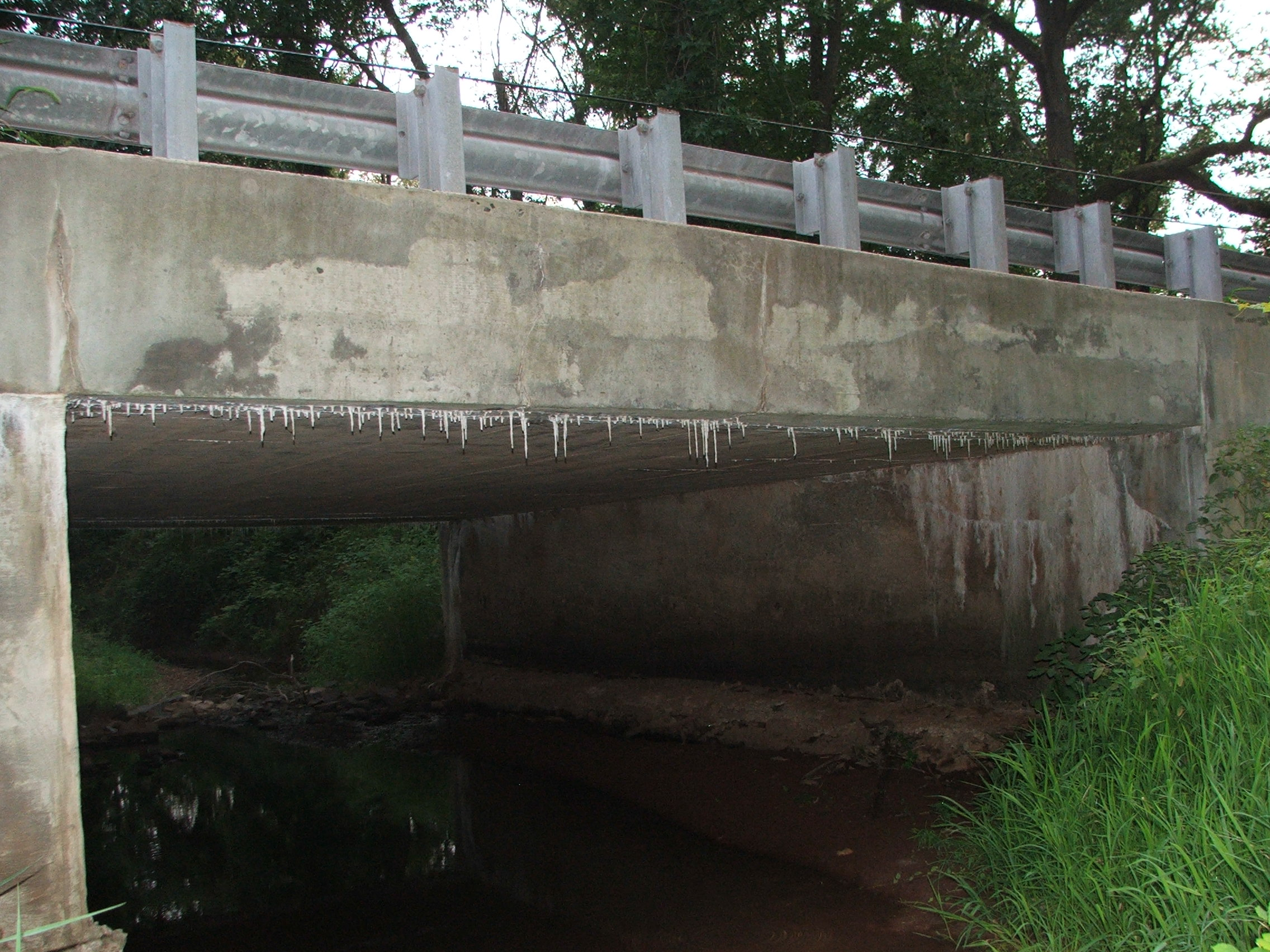
Zoomed out version of stalactites to get a perspective on the size

== See also ==
- List of rivers of New Jersey
