= Six Mile Lake =

Six Mile Lake or Sixmile Lake may refer to:

== In Canada ==
- Six Mile Lake (Nova Scotia)
- Six Mile Lake (Ontario)
  - Six Mile Lake Provincial Park, on the above lake

== In the United States ==
- Six Mile Lake (Alaska)
- Sixmile Lake, Michigan, of Elk River Chain of Lakes Watershed
- Sixmile Lake (Minnesota)
- Sixmile Lake (South Dakota)

== See also ==
- Lake Buel, Massachusetts, once known as Six Mile Pond
