= Cross Brook (New Jersey) =

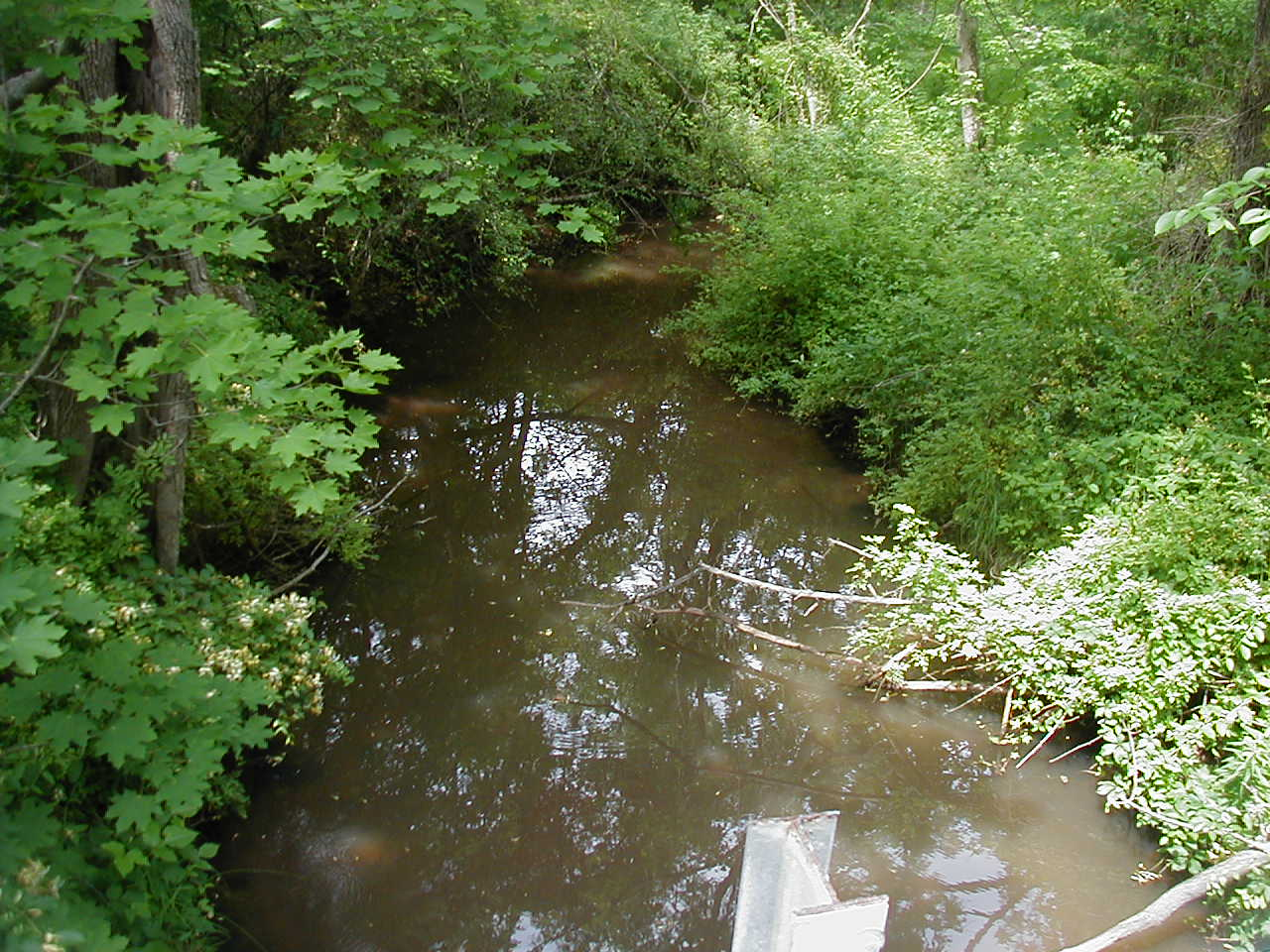
- Cross Brook crossing Jacques Lane

Location
- Country: United States

Physical characteristics
- Source
  - coordinates: 40°27′7″N 74°33′33″W
- Mouth
  - coordinates: 40°28′23″N 74°33′6″W
  - elevation: 59 ft (18 m)

Basin features
- Progression: Six Mile Run, Millstone River, Raritan River, Atlantic Ocean
- River system: Raritan River system

Cross Brook is a tributary of Six Mile Run in Somerset and Middlesex Counties, New Jersey in the United States.

== Course ==
The source of Cross Brook is near Suydam Road in eastern Franklin Park, at 40°27′7″N 74°33′33″W. It flows through the Six Mile Run Reservoir Site and crosses Jacques Lane. After Jacques Lane it drains into the Six Mile Run at 40°28′23″N 74°33′6″W.

== Animal life ==
Cross Brook is a slow-moving stream, although it is not marshy. Some species of fish may be expected to be found in it.

== Terrain ==
The Cross Brook starts as a lake which drains into grasslands, forming a marshy area around its source. It is still muddy farther downstream. It tends to be a wide, slow, deep stream.

== Accessibility ==
Cross Brook is a short stream, only crossing one road. There are a few trails in the woods that lead to it.

== Sister tributaries ==
- Nine Mile Run
- Steep Hill Brook
- Middlebush Brook

== Gallery ==
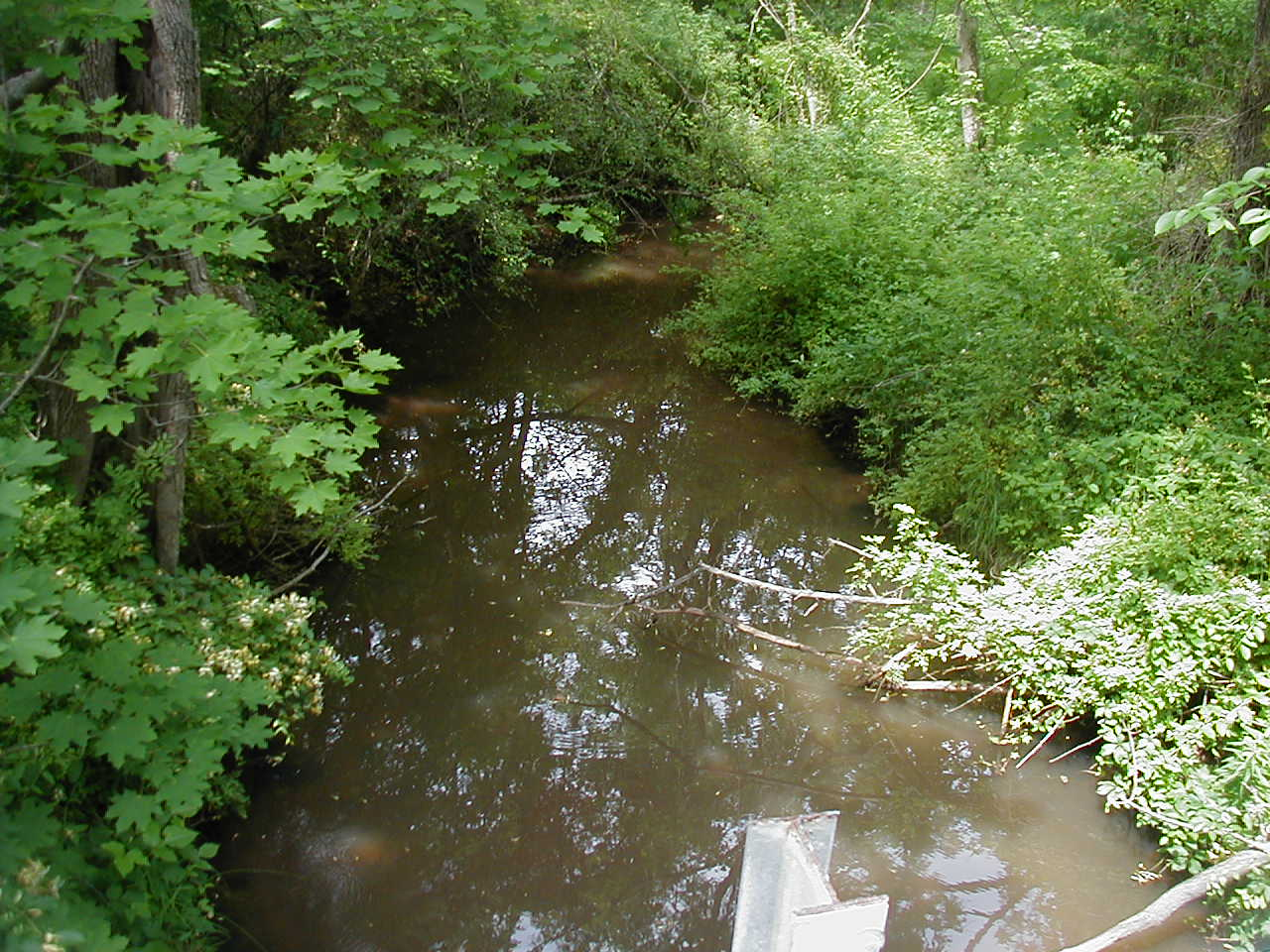
Cross Brook crossing Jacques Lane

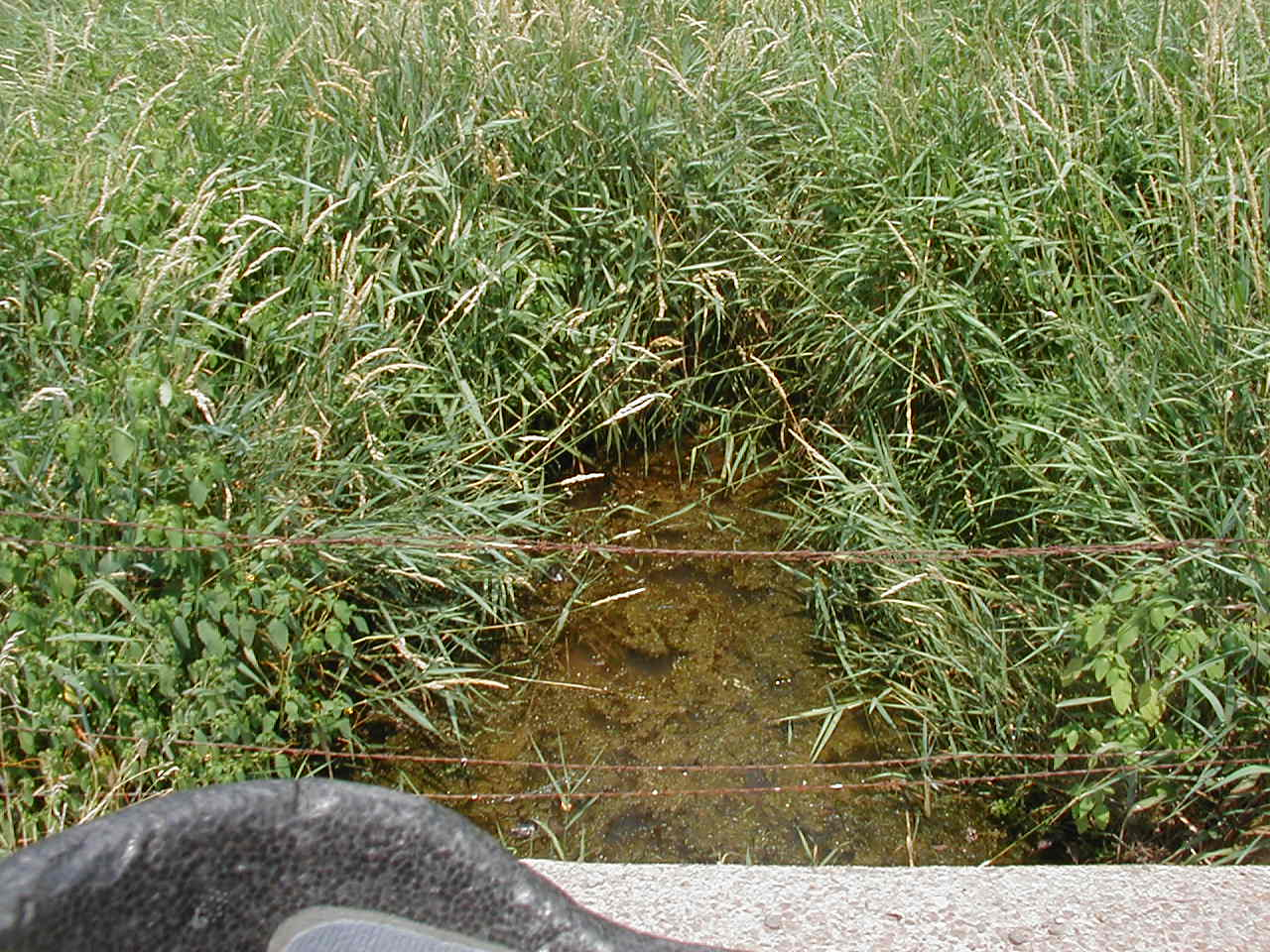
Cross Brook flowing through grasslands near its source

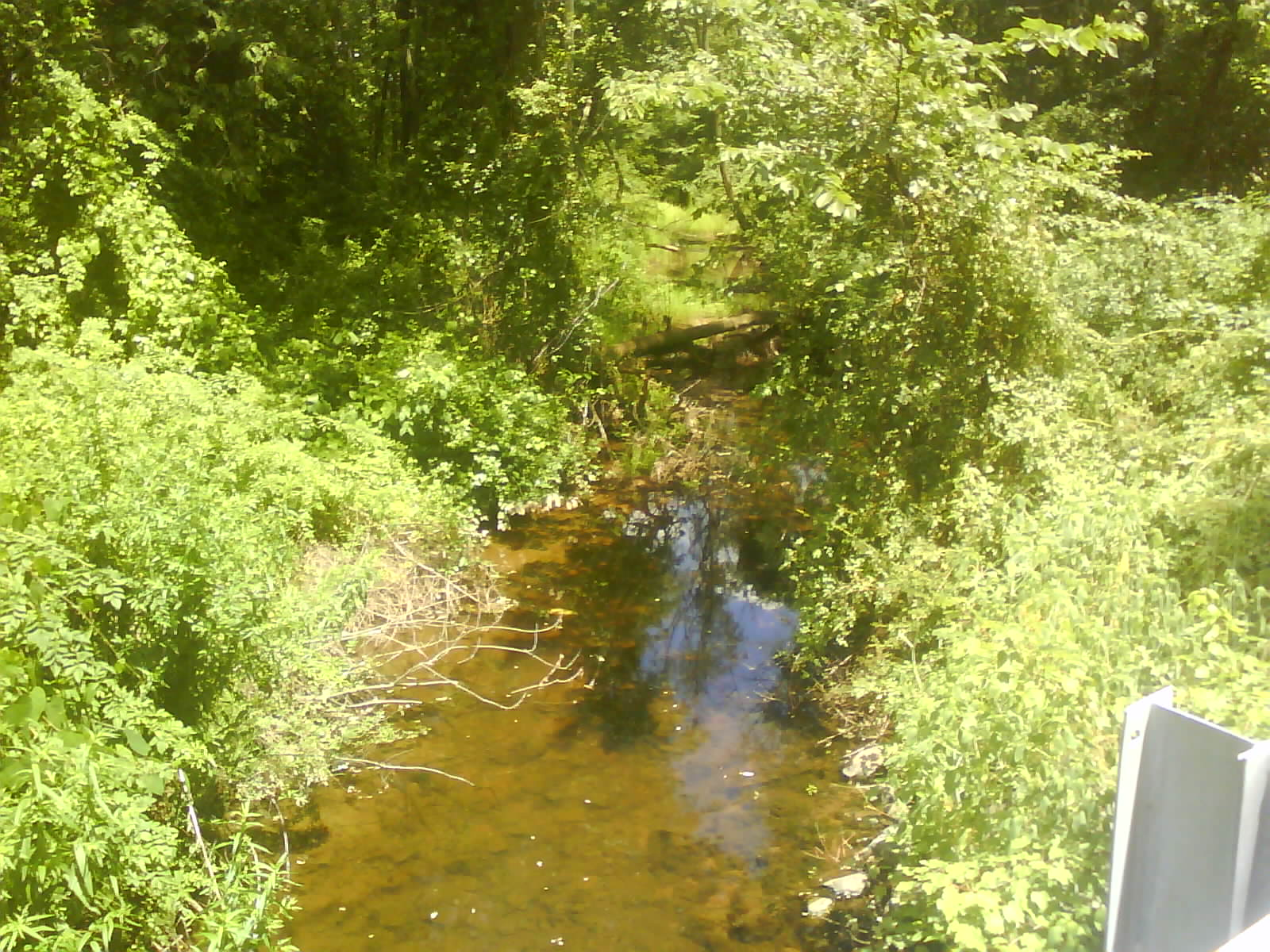
Cross Brook crossing Jacques Lane

== See also ==
- List of rivers of New Jersey
