= Six Mile Creek =

Six Mile Creek or Sixmile Creek may refer to:

== Australia ==
- Six Mile Creek Dam, Queensland

== United States ==
=== Streams ===
Alphabetical by state

- Sixmile Creek (Alaska)
- Six Mile Creek (Minnesota)
- Six Mile Creek (Ithaca), Tompkins County, New York
- Sixmile Creek (Mohawk River tributary), Oriskany, New York
- Six-Mile Creek (Pennsylvania), see List of city parks of Erie, Pennsylvania
- Sixmile Creek (South Dakota)

=== Other ===
- Six Mile Creek Stage Station Historic District, Morris County, Kansas
- Sixmile Creek Formation, a geologic formation in Montana

== See also ==
- Six Mile Run (disambiguation)
- Six Mile (disambiguation)
