= Middlebush Brook (New Jersey) =

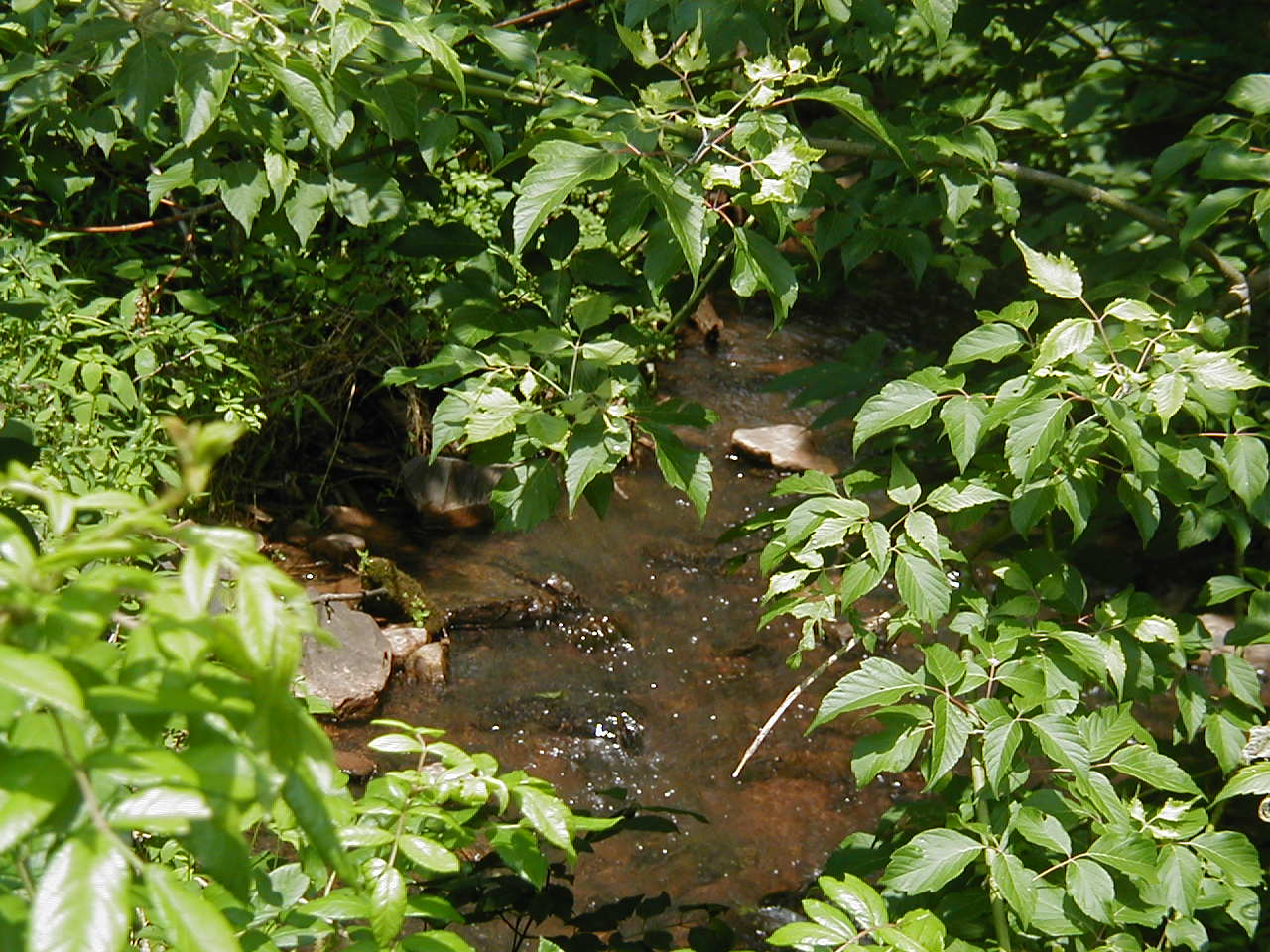
- Middlebush Brook crossing Blackwells Mills Road, near its mouth

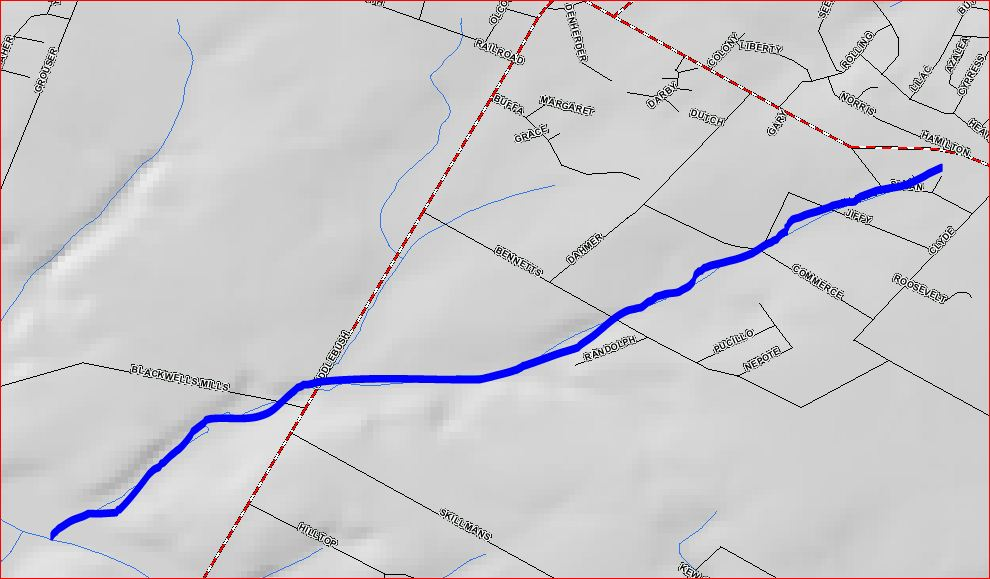
- Middlebush Brook map

Location
- Country: United States

Physical characteristics
- Source
  - coordinates: 40°29′21″N 74°30′41″W
- Mouth
  - coordinates: 40°28′21″N 74°33′02″W
  - elevation: 59 ft (18 m)

Basin features
- Progression: Six Mile Run, Millstone River, Raritan River, Atlantic Ocean

Middlebush Brook is a tributary of Six Mile Run in Somerset County, New Jersey in the United States.

As its name suggests, Middlebush Brook begins in the town of Middlebush. Its source is at 40°29′21″N 74°30′41″W, just south of Hamilton Street in north-western Franklin Park.

== Tributaries ==
This stream has several unnamed tributaries. One closely parallels South Middlebush Road before splitting into two more tributaries. One of them ends in a development near Amwell Road (the same road as Hamilton Street), while the other is a drain for a residential development.

== Course ==
Middlebush Brook starts at 40°29′21″N 74°30′41″W in a commercial development. It exits the commerce area and flows through a marsh, then crossing Bennetts Lane. It runs behind a cow farm then crosses South Middlebush Road right above Blackwells Mills Road. It crosses Blackwells Mills Road a little later on, then drains into Six Mile Run at 40°28′21″N 74°33′02″W.

It has several branches, including one that runs for a distance along South Middlebush Road and one that flows to a residential development near CR-514 (Amwell Road).

== Accessibility ==
This stream flows through wooded areas downstream, where it is not accessible easily. It is accessible upstream though, where it flows through a residential development.

It may be accessed, though with difficulty, at the Blackwells Mills Road crossing.

== Terrain ==
This stream has a streambed composed of small boulders, making it difficult to walk on. Some locations have pebbles. It is not muddy and therefore is not suitable for frogs.

== Sister tributaries ==
- Cross Brook
- Steep Hill Brook
- Nine Mile Run

== Gallery ==
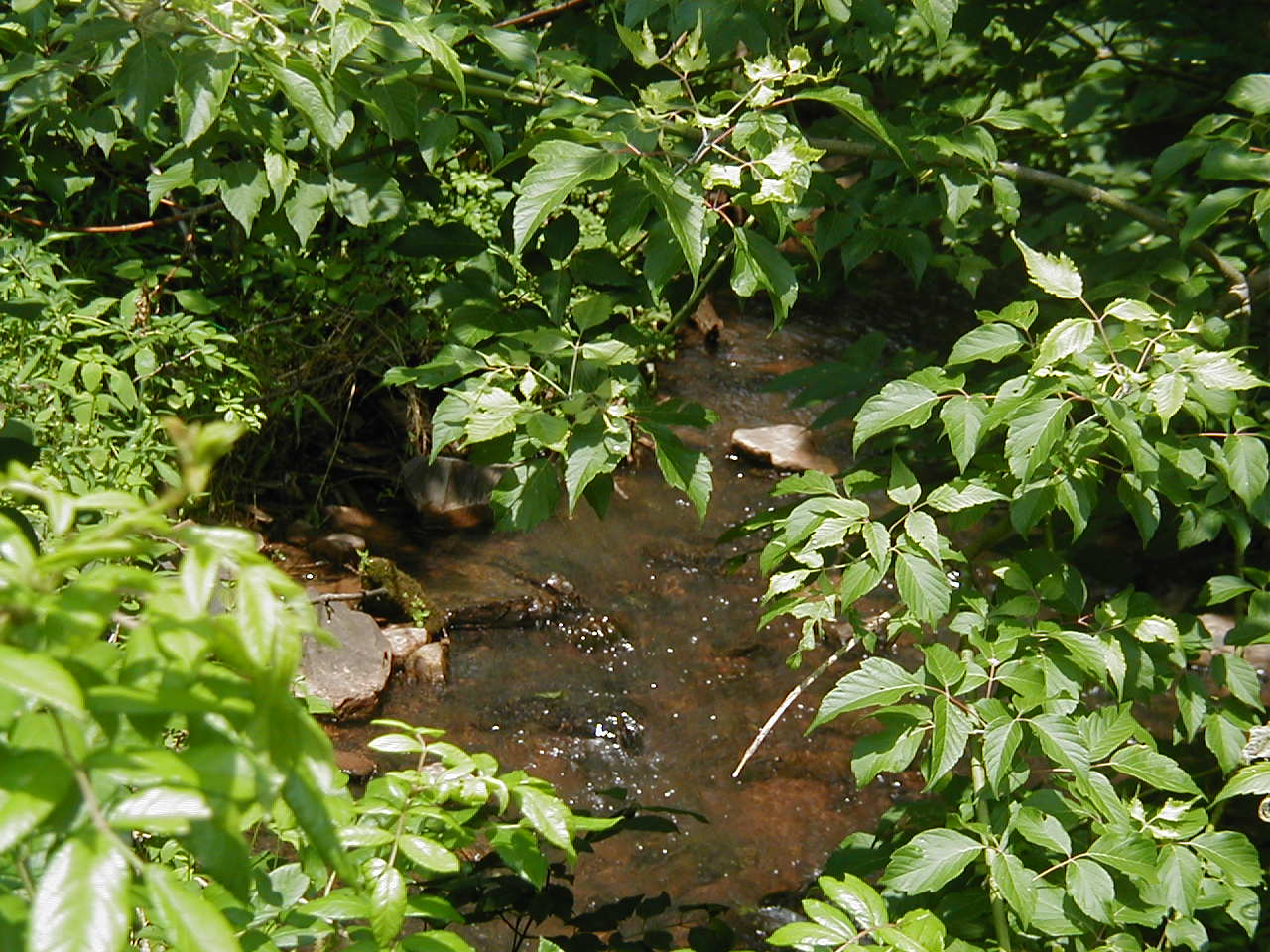
Middlebush Brook at Blackwells Mills Road, just before its mouth

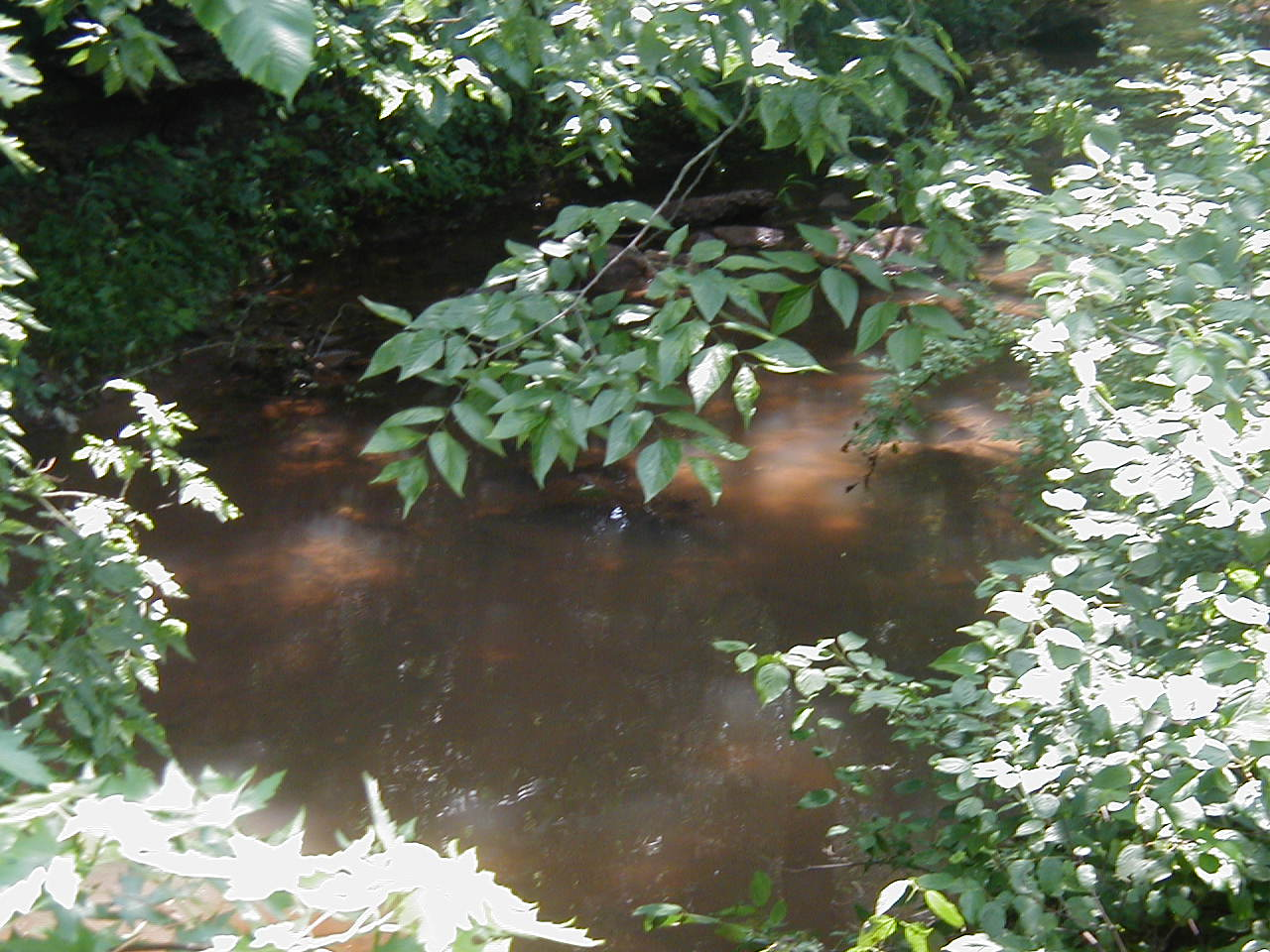
Middlebush Brook at Blackwells Mills Road, just before its mouth

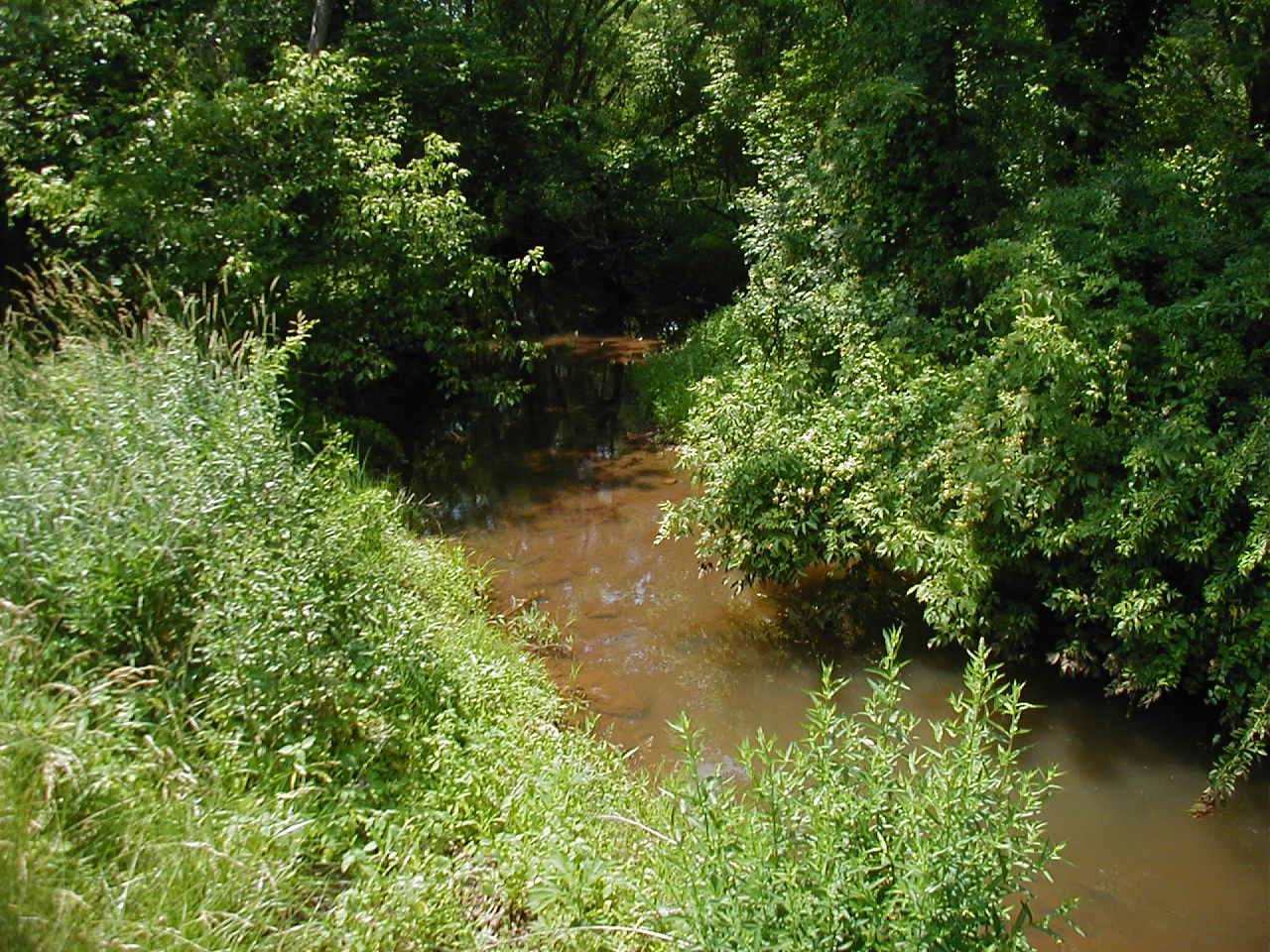
Middlebush Brook crossing South Middlebush Road

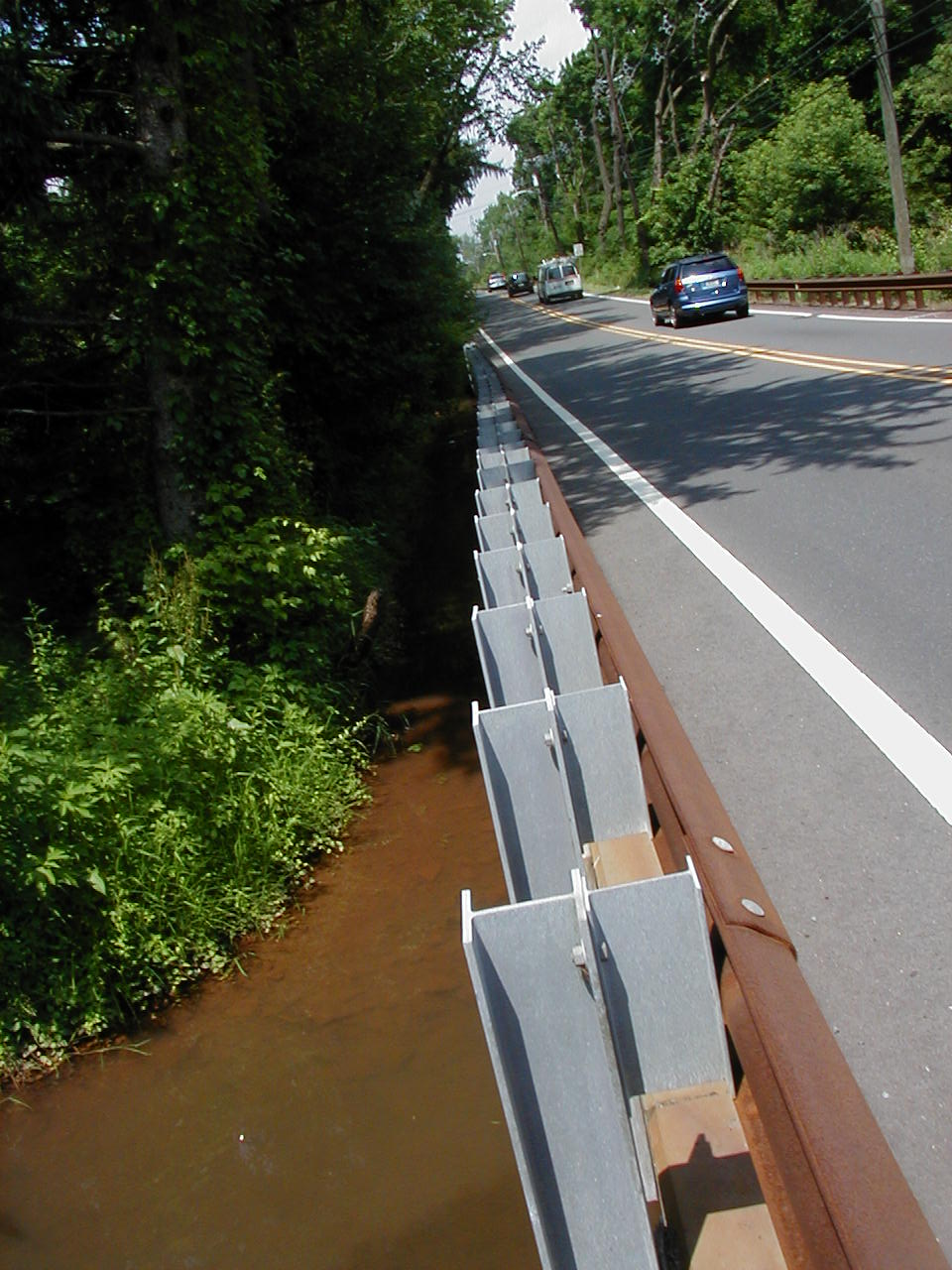
Branch of Middlebush Brook running alongside South Middlebush Road

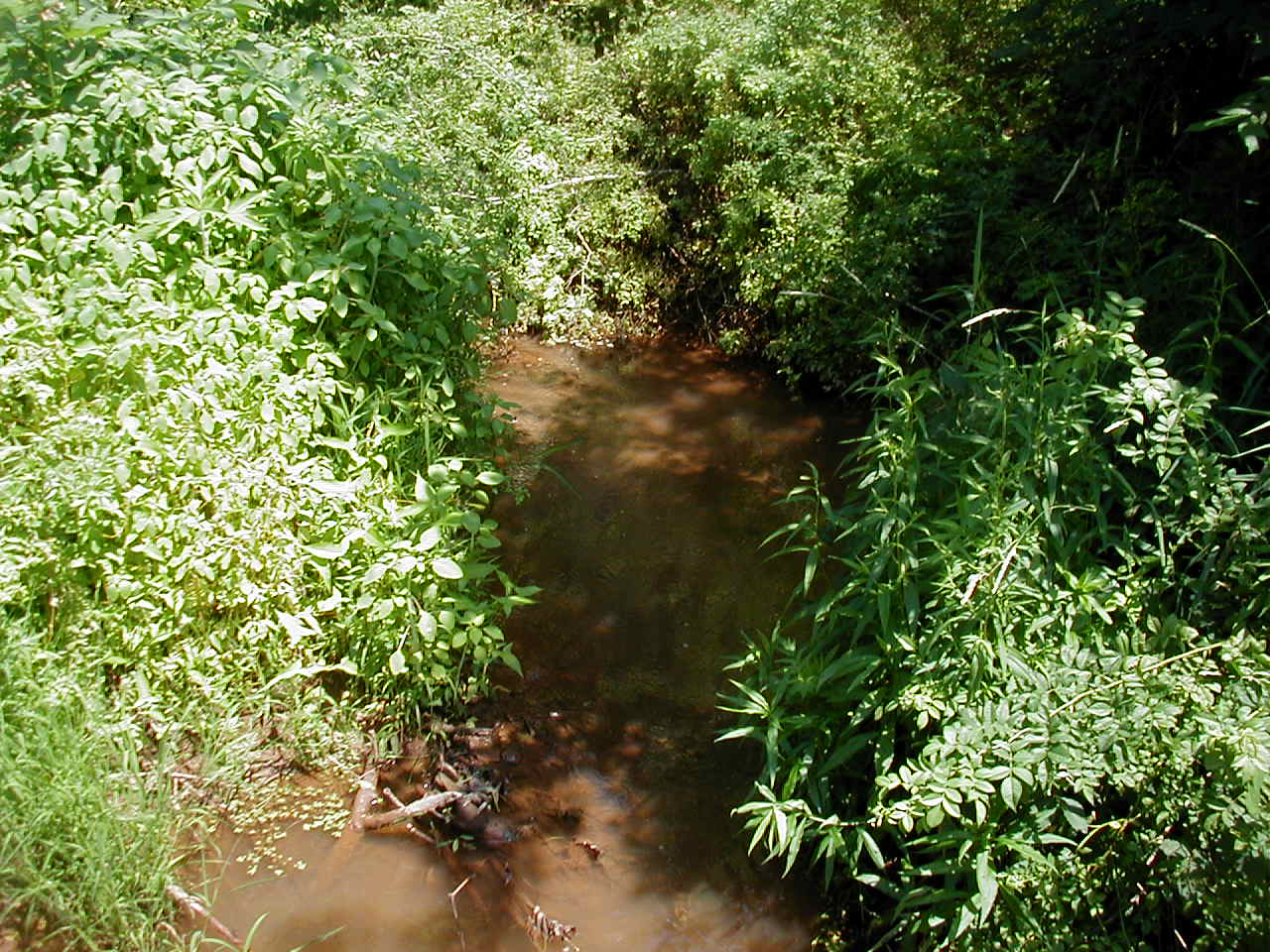
Branch of Middlebush Brook crossing South Middlebush Road

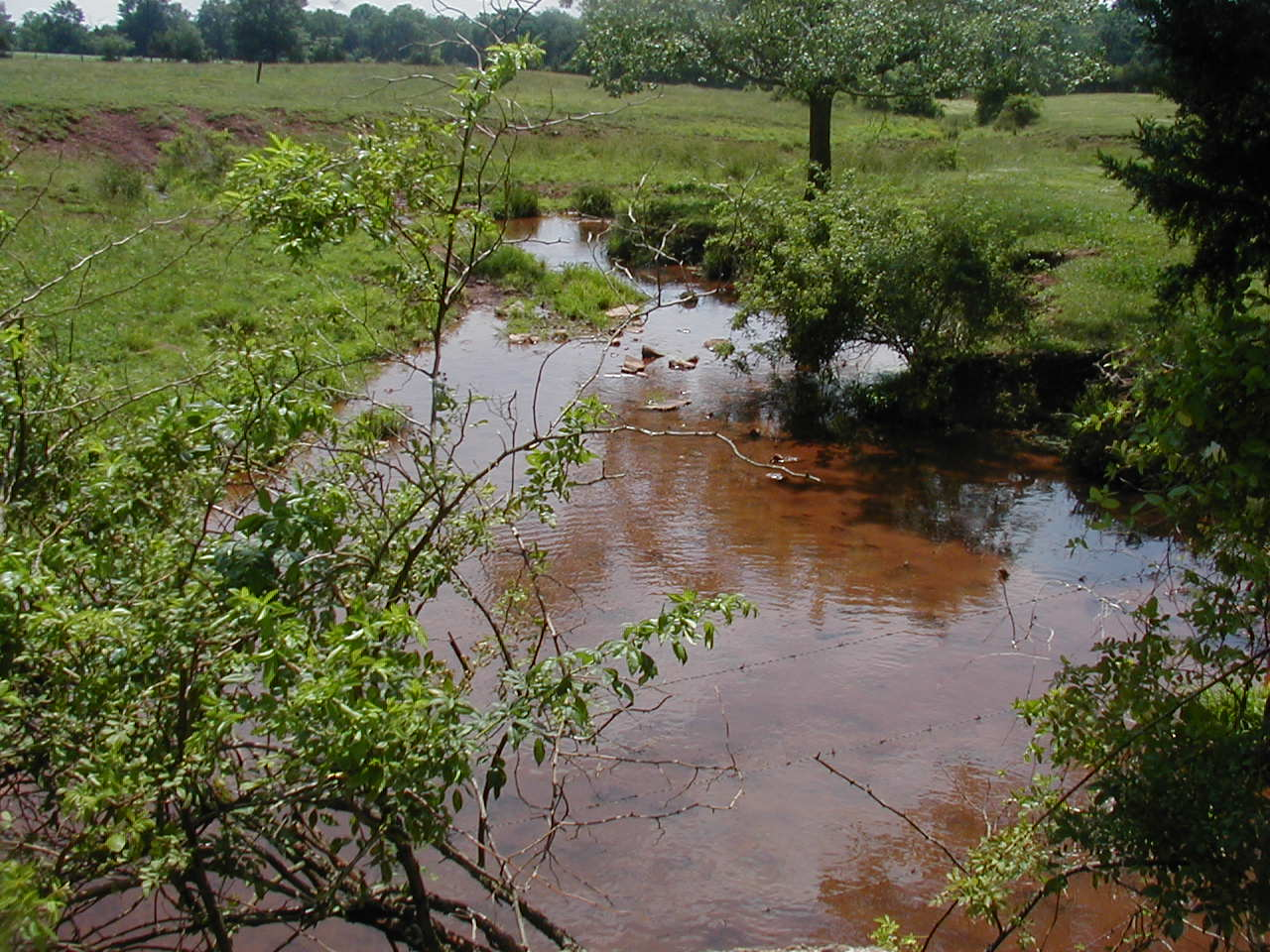
Branch of Middlebush Brook mentioned above running through a dairy farm

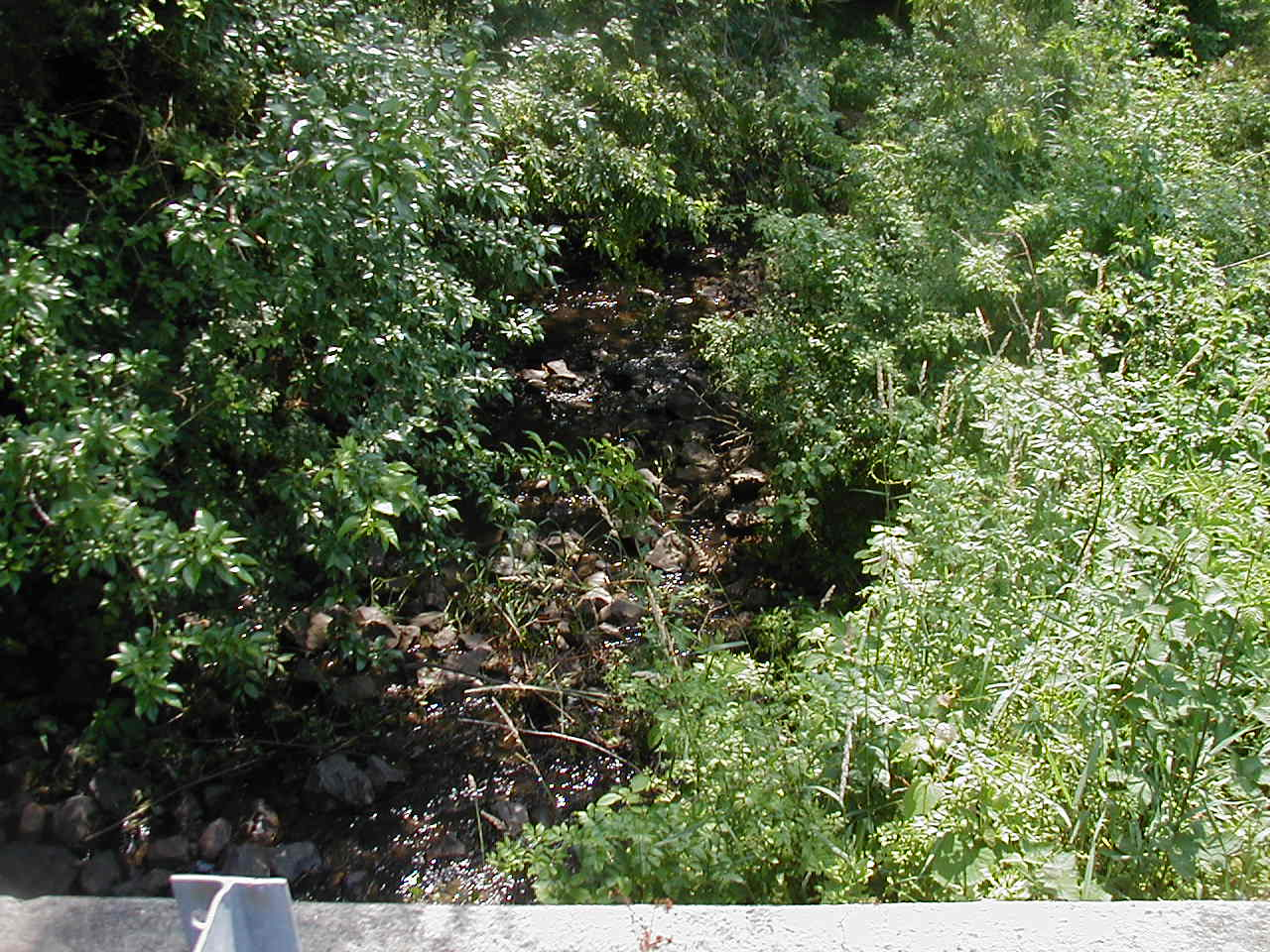
Middlebush Brook crossing Bennets Lane

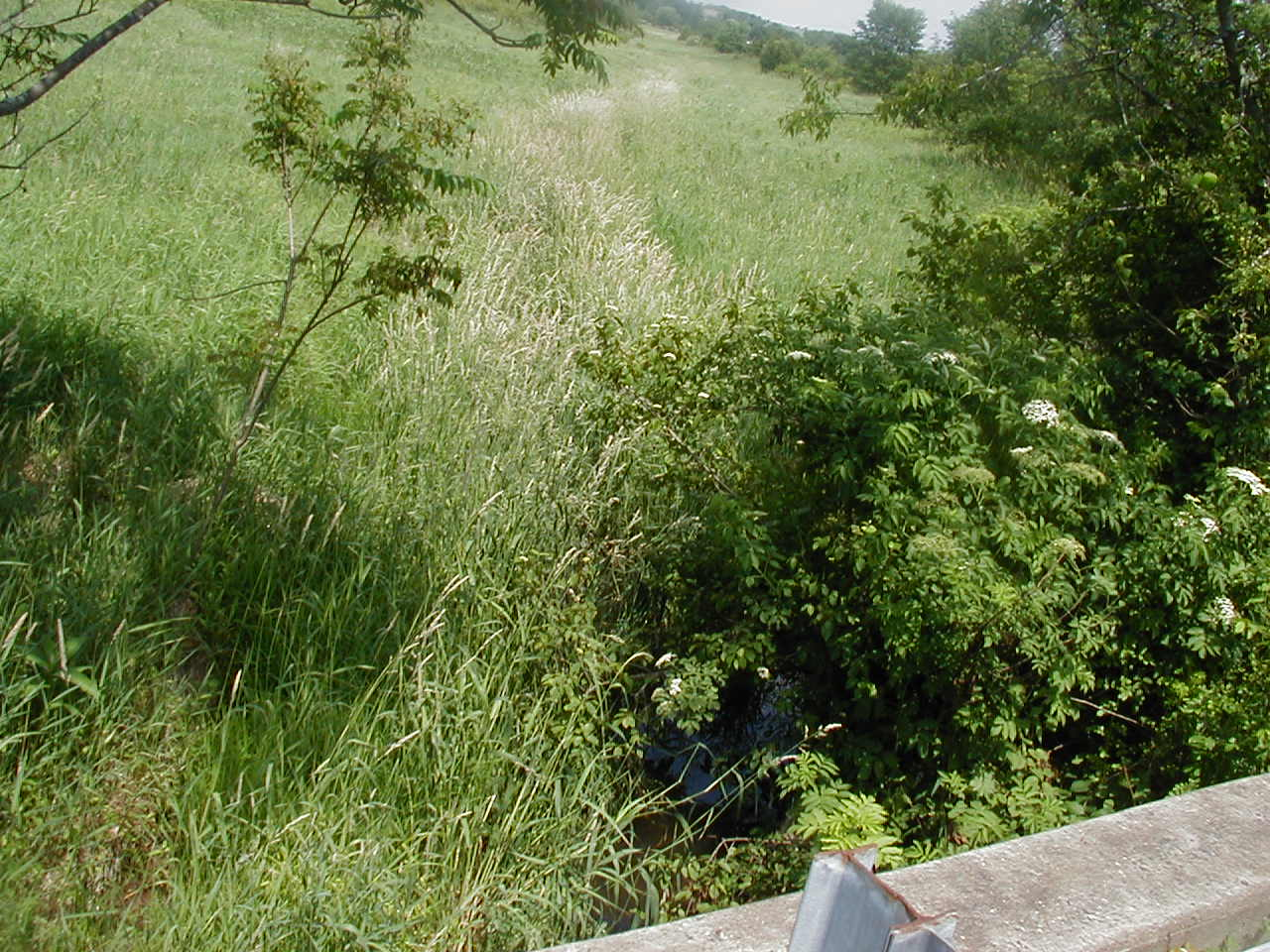
Middlebush Brook crossing Bennets Lane, lost in a marsh

== See also ==
- List of rivers of New Jersey
