= Six Mile Run Reservoir Site =

Part of the Delaware and Raritan Canal State Park

Coordinates: 40.475207°N 74.566569°W

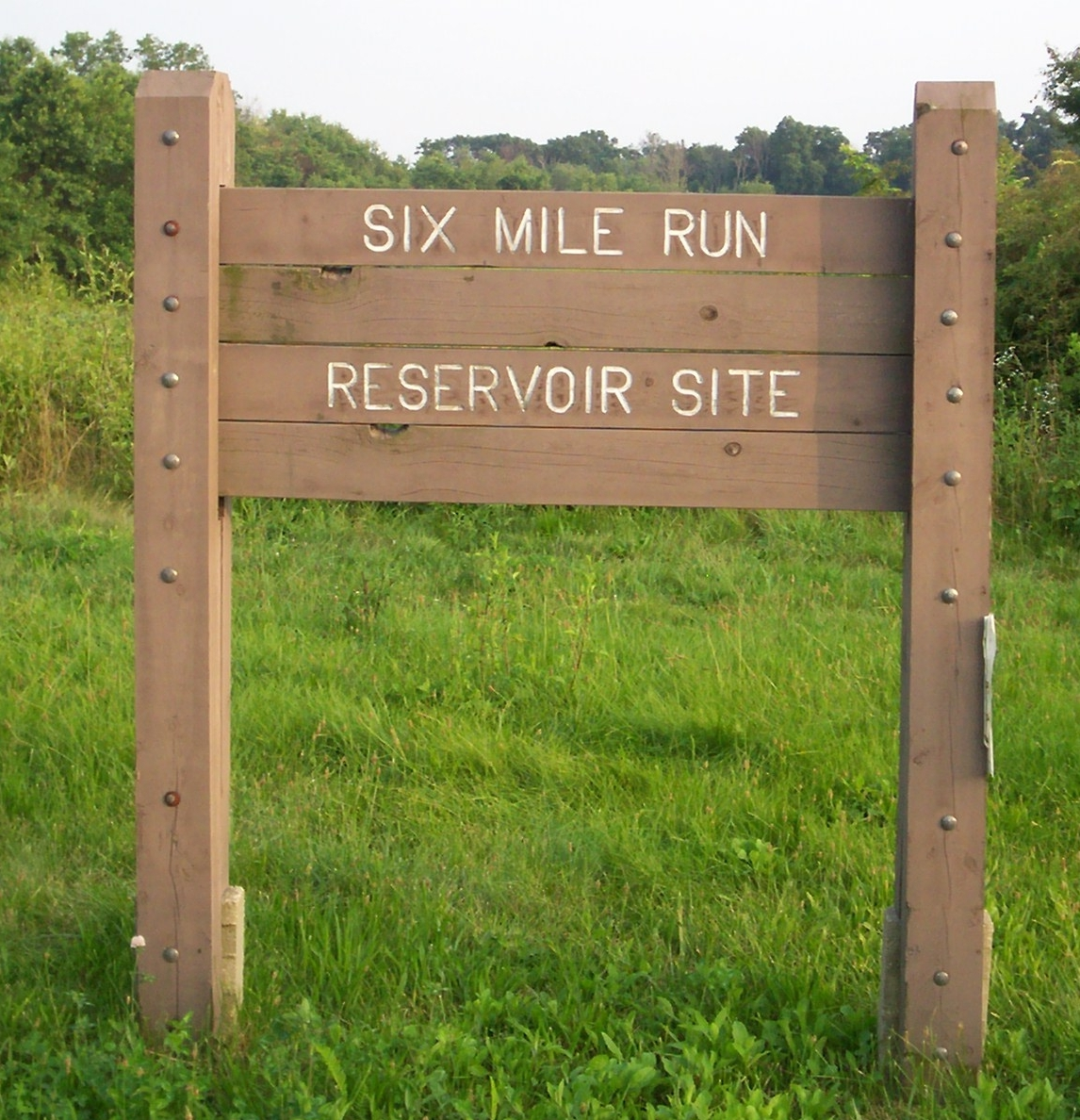
Six Mile Run Reservoir Site

The Six Mile Run Reservoir Site, part of the Delaware and Raritan Canal State Park, is located in Franklin Township, Somerset County, New Jersey, United States. It is adjacent to the Delaware and Raritan Canal. It covers 3,037 acres (12.29 km^{2}). The reservoir plan was to flood the Six Mile Run watershed. The Six Mile Run is a tributary of the Millstone River that, with its tributaries (Cross Brook, Middlebush Brook, Nine Mile Run and Steep Hill Brook and several other unnamed ones), drains a large area in central Franklin Township, Somerset County, New Jersey and western portions of North Brunswick and South Brunswick Townships in Middlesex County, New Jersey. It derives its name, along with other streams (Mile Run, Three Mile Run, Nine Mile Run, and Ten Mile Run), from the distance early surveyors estimated it was from the point where the historic King's Highway (now Rt. 27) left the Raritan River at New Brunswick to the point the roadway crossed the stream. The estimates were not very accurate but the stream names have remained in use ever since.

== History ==
The land first came under serious consideration as a reservoir site with a 1958 referendum. In 1962, the Freeholders of Somerset County were informed on the intention to use the land for this purpose by the New Jersey Division of Water Power and Supply. It was debated and challenged throughout the 1960s by citizens and politicians. The land was acquired by the state of New Jersey in 1970, through the New Jersey Department of Environmental Protection, Division of Water Resources as a future reservoir and recreation area. The reservoir was never built and in 1993 administration of the area was transferred to the New Jersey Division of Parks and Forestry when alternative water supply sources were found.

Because part of the land at the site was taken out of cultivation 39 years ago, the process of "old field succession" has now yielded up trees and foliage that are unique among state park lands. In the section between Canal Road and South Middlebush Road, there are postings describing the foliage and the natural process.
