= Six Mile Lake (Nova Scotia) =

Lake in Nova Scotia, Canada

Six Mile Lake, Nova Scotia
- Location within Nova Scotia
- Location: Halifax Regional Municipality, Nova Scotia
- Coordinates: 44.651554°N 63.712414°W
- Basin countries: Canada

Six Mile Lake, Nova Scotia is a lake about 2 Kilometers west of Halifax City in the Halifax Regional Municipality, Nova Scotia, Canada.

== See also ==
- List of lakes in Nova Scotia
