= Sixmile Lake (Minnesota) =

Lake in the state of Minnesota, United States

- Location within Minnesota
- Location: Cass County, Minnesota
- Coordinates: 47°18′48″N 94°8′34″W
- Type: lake

Sixmile Lake is a lake in Cass County, Minnesota, in the United States.

Sixmile Lake was named from its distance, 6 miles (9.7 km) from the Indian agency on the Leech Lake Indian Reservation.

== See also ==
- List of lakes in Minnesota
