= 6 Mile, Lae =

6 Mile
- Suburb
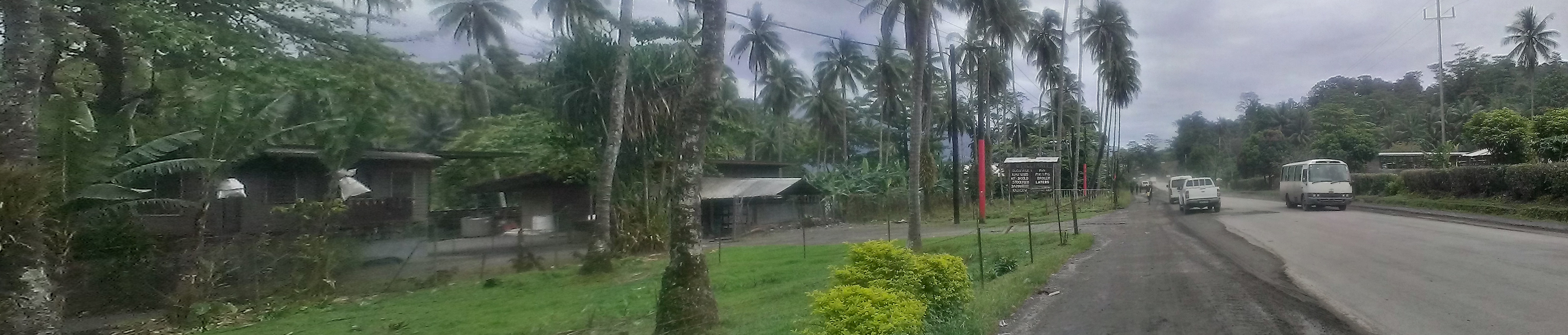
- 6 Mile farm and dairy on foothills of Atzera Range

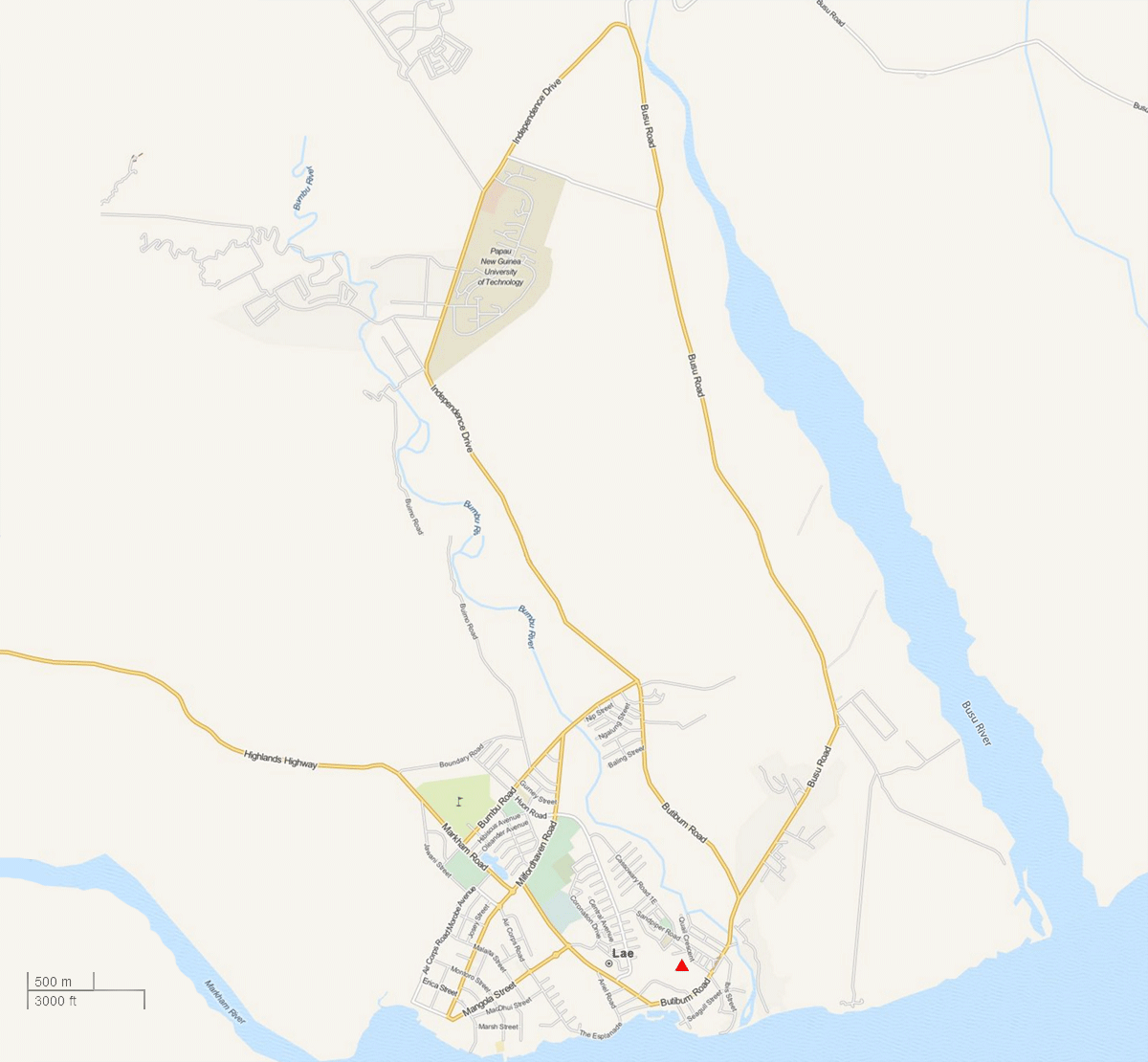
- Location in Lae
- Coordinates: 6°42′19″S 146°55′25″E
- Country: Papua New Guinea
- Province: Morobe Province
- District: Lae District
- Time zone: UTC+10 (AEST)

6 Mile is a suburb of Lae in the Morobe Province, Papua New Guinea.

== Geography ==
6 Mile is located 6 miles (9.7 km) from the center of Lae on the Highlands Highway between the foothills of the Atzera Range and the Markham River. The Atzera Range starts at Bugandi and runs adjacent to the Markham River has an elevation of 280 meters above sea level.

Anticlines in the vicinity of Lae, such as the Atzera Range and hills near Situm, appear to indicate that the Ramu-Markham Fault (which follows the northern edge of the Markham Valley) changes dip close to the surface from a steep ramp to a shallow fault, breaching the surface south of Lae.

The Lae Seismic Zone has been identified between the Atzera Range and Situm which has the potential to generate shallow Mw~7.0 earthquakes and landslides around the Atzera Range. The possibility of major landsides in this area has increased as a result of human modification to the natural vegetation cover through clearing and gardening.

== History ==
Before the construction of the Highlands Highway, a road in the Atzera foothills in the Markham Valley connected Nadzab with Lae and a rough trail on the other side of the Atzeras paralleled this road from Lae to Yalu. Edward's Plantation was located around 5 Mile, Heath's Plantation around 6 Mile, Lane's Plantation and Whittaker's Plantation around 9 Mile and Jensen's Plantation around 10 Mile. On 10 September the 25th Australian Infantry Brigade moved East from Nadzab towards Lae along the Atzera foothills often with fierce battles through these plantations. The battle at Heaths plantation resulted in Richard Kelliher being awarded the Victoria Cross for charging at a Japanese machine gun. The 9th Division approached Lae from the East and on 16 September both units converged on Lae.

The 1983 floods remain the worst natural disaster since the establishment of the town in the late 1920s. Hundreds of people at the Five Mile settlement along the Highland Highway were also affected by mud-slides from the Atzera mountain ranges.

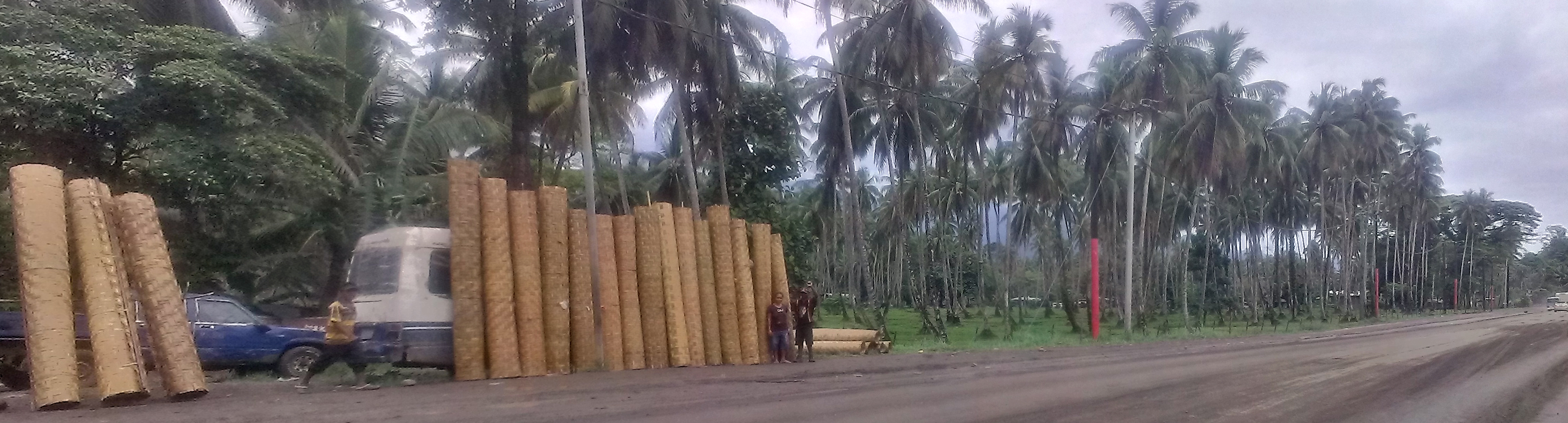
Panoramic photo of a roadside stall selling pre fabricated building walls at 6 Mile, on Nadzab Road, Lae Papua New Guinea

=== Atzera Hills Project ===
In 1978 the Human Ecology Programme of the Department of Minerals and Energy, assisted by the UNEP and UNESCO (Man and the Biosphere MAB Project 11) and in co-operation with the Lae City Council, instigated the Atzera Hills Project, described as an ecologically sound management system to arrest the rapid deterioration and loss of productive capacity of 600 ha of Atzera Hills.

The Atzera project folded after only three years despite efforts to train and raise awareness on the benefits of charcoal, the uptake in PNG households was minimal.

Heavy rains in 2005 resulted in the Morobe administration highlighting the vulnerability of the city to the weather and recommending that a major rehabilitation program be started immediately to reforest the surrounding hills behind the city to prevent soil erosion. This problem has been exacerbated as a result of the increased number of squatter settlements.

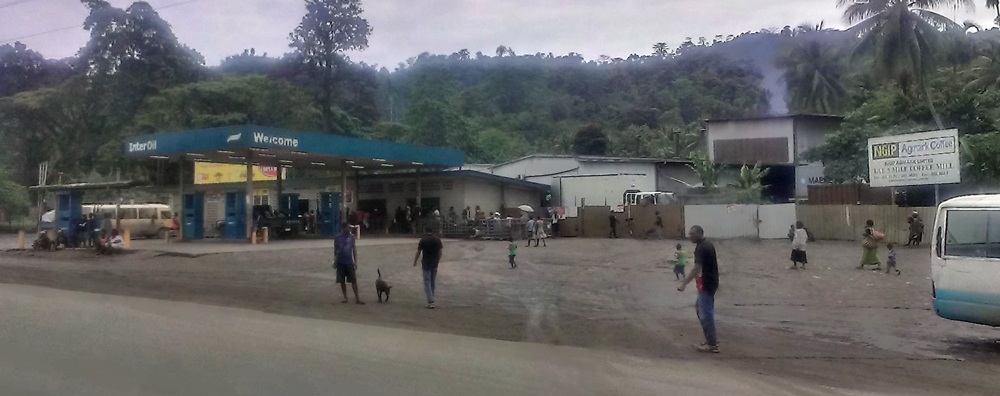
Panoramic photo of Interoil Service station and Agmark Coffee Mill at 5 Mile, on Nadzab Road, Lae Papua New Guinea
