= Six Mile Island =

Six Mile Island or Sixmile Island may refer to:

- Sixmile Island (Pennsylvania), an alluvial island in Allegheny County
- Six Mile Island State Nature Preserve, a national preserve in Kentucky
