= Six Mile Run (New Jersey) =

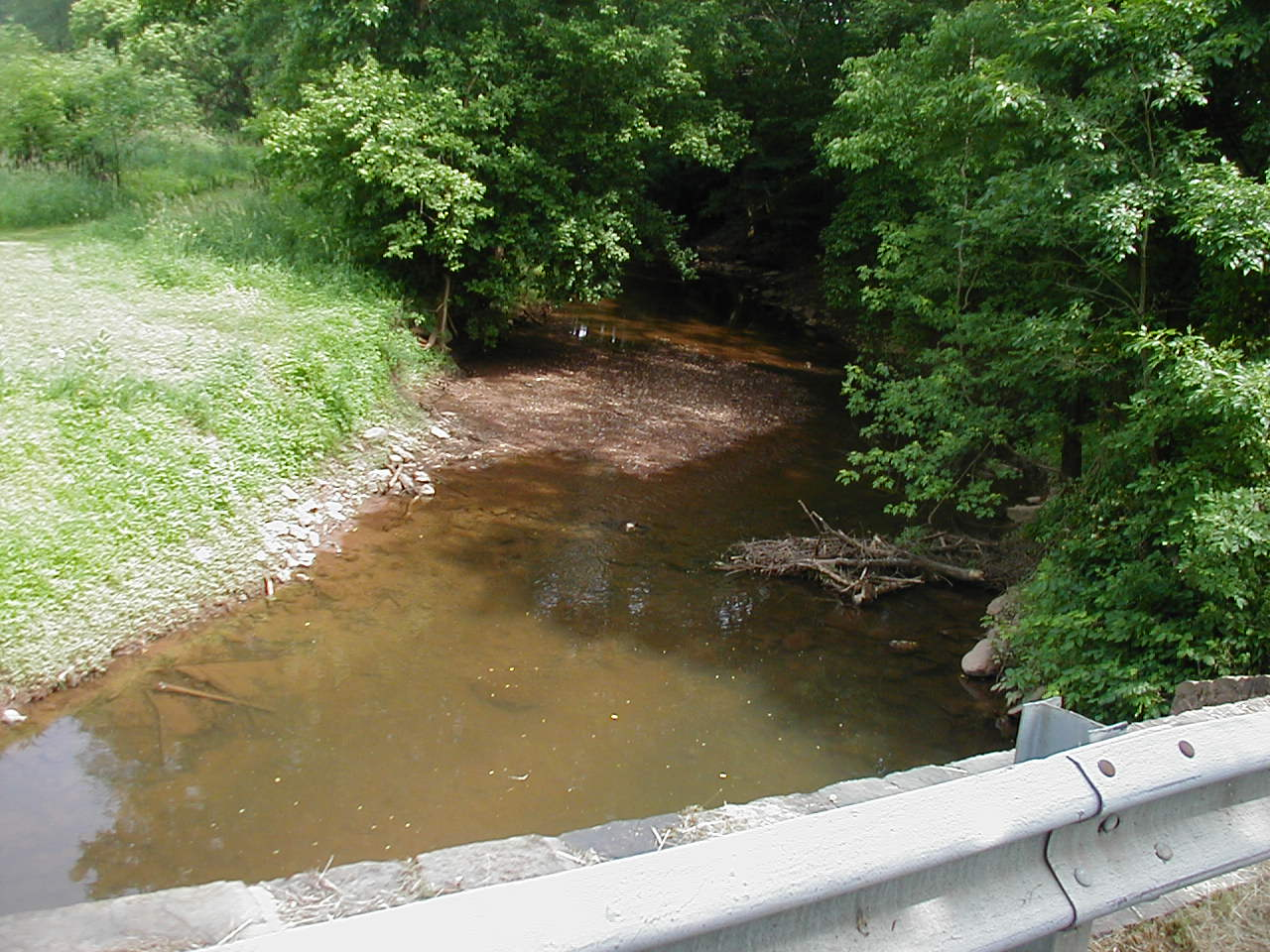
- Six Mile Run near its mouth in the Millstone River

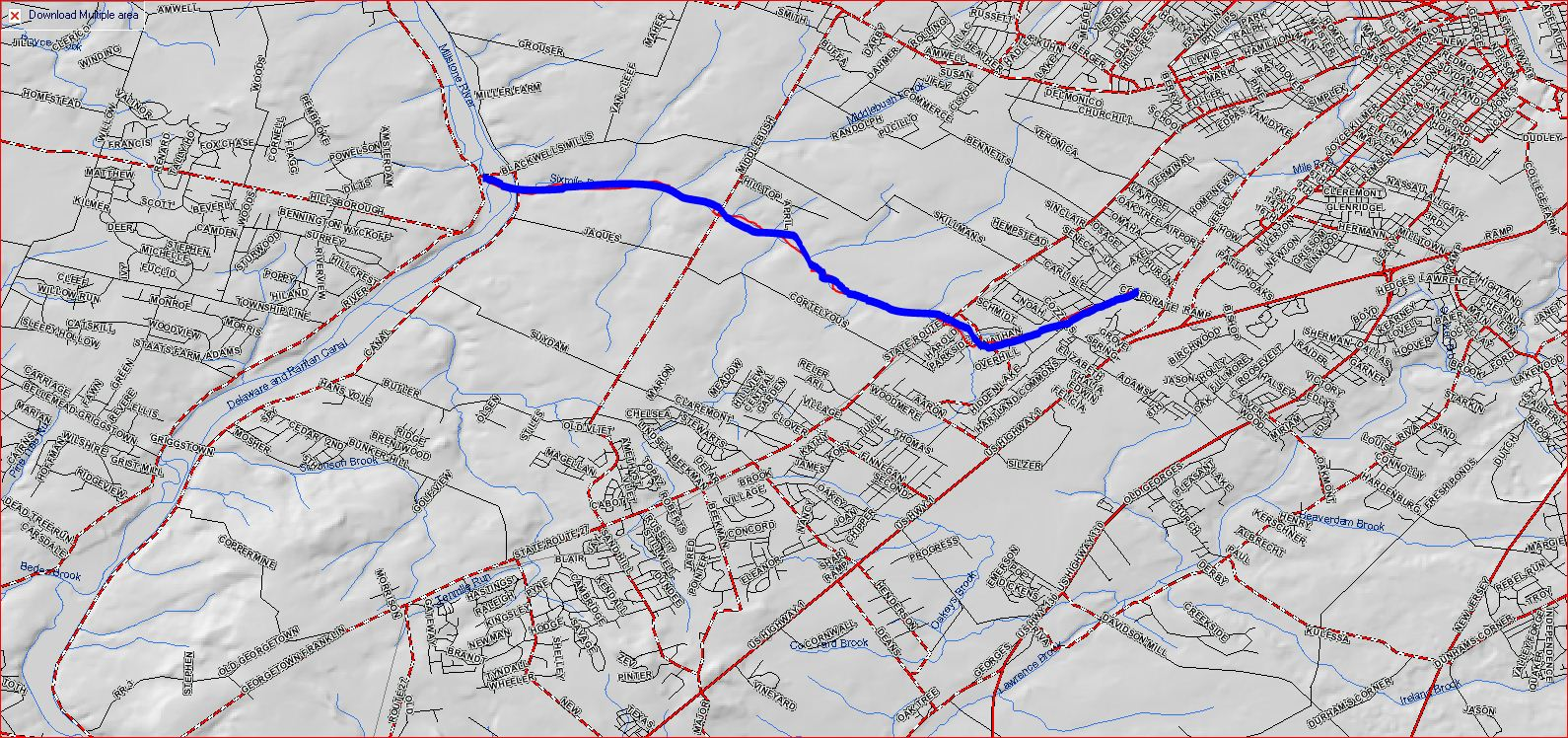
- Map of area with Six Mile Run highlighted

Location
- Country: United States

Physical characteristics
- Source
  - coordinates: 40°27′35″N 74°29′11″W
  - elevation: 39 ft (12 m)
- Mouth
  - coordinates: 40°28′21″N 74°34′20″W

Basin features
- Progression: Millstone River, Raritan River, Atlantic Ocean
- Tributaries
  - left: Steep Hill Brook, Middlebush Brook
  - right: Cross Brook, Nine Mile Run

Six Mile Run is a tributary of the Millstone River that drains a large area in central Franklin Township in Somerset County and as well western portions of North Brunswick and South Brunswick Townships in Middlesex County, New Jersey in the United States.

== Name ==
Six Mile Run derives its name (along with other area streams including Mile Run, Three Mile Run, Nine Mile Run, and Ten Mile Run) from the distance early surveyors estimated it was from the point where the historic King's Highway (now Rt. 27) left the Raritan River at New Brunswick to the point the roadway crossed the stream. The estimates were not very accurate but the stream names have remained in use ever since.

== Course ==
Six Mile Run starts near Corporate Road in North Brunswick 40°27′35″N 74°29′11″W. It crosses Cozzens Lane, then flows through a residential development. It joins up with the drainage from a lake then crosses Rt. 27. It then joins with the Nine Mile Run, a major tributary, and crosses South Middlebush Rd. It then crosses Canal Road and drains into the Millstone River 40°28′21″N 74°34′20″W.

== Accessibility ==
Six Mile Run is easily accessible in several places, including Cozzens Lane and the residential development. It also can be accessed at Route 27, South Middlebush Road, and Canal Road, as well as the D&R Canal Trail. It can be also accessed by trails in the Six Mile Run Reservoir Site.

== Terrain ==
Six Mile Run is generally between rocky and muddy terrain. Near Cozzens Lane, the streambed is rocky with a muddy covering. It is quite deep in many places. Farther downstream in the residential development, the stream becomes more rocky and fast flowing. It then becomes rocky and deep near Route 27, and remains like that for most of its downstream course. It widens considerably when it joins the Nine Mile Run. Near its mouth, it has a mixture of pebbles and sand for its streambed. Many large fish are found in the deep pools near the Delaware and Raritan Canal.

== Tributaries ==
- Cross Brook
- Middlebush Brook
- Nine Mile Run
- Steep Hill Brook

The Six Mile Run has a large unnamed tributary that flows northward, crossing Skillmans Lane, Bennets Lane, and Veronica Avenue.

== Sister Tributaries ==
- Beden Brook
- Bear Brook
- Cranbury Brook
- Devils Brook
- Harrys Brook
- Heathcote Brook
- Indian Run Brook
- Little Bear Brook
- Millstone Brook
- Peace Brook
- Rocky Brook
- Royce Brook
- Simonson Brook
- Stony Brook
- Ten Mile Run
- Van Horn Brook

== Gallery ==
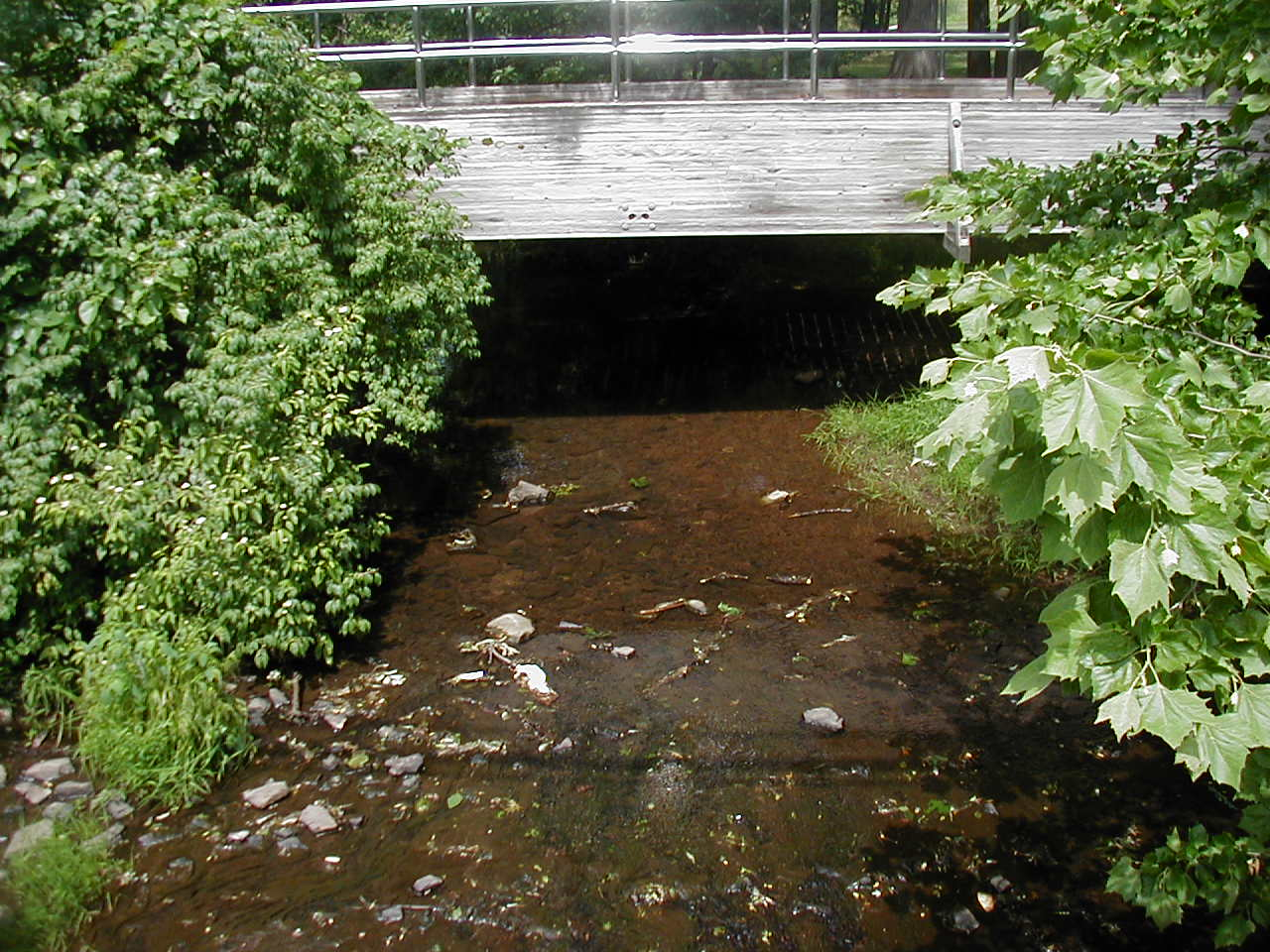
Six Mile Run crossing Cozzens Lane

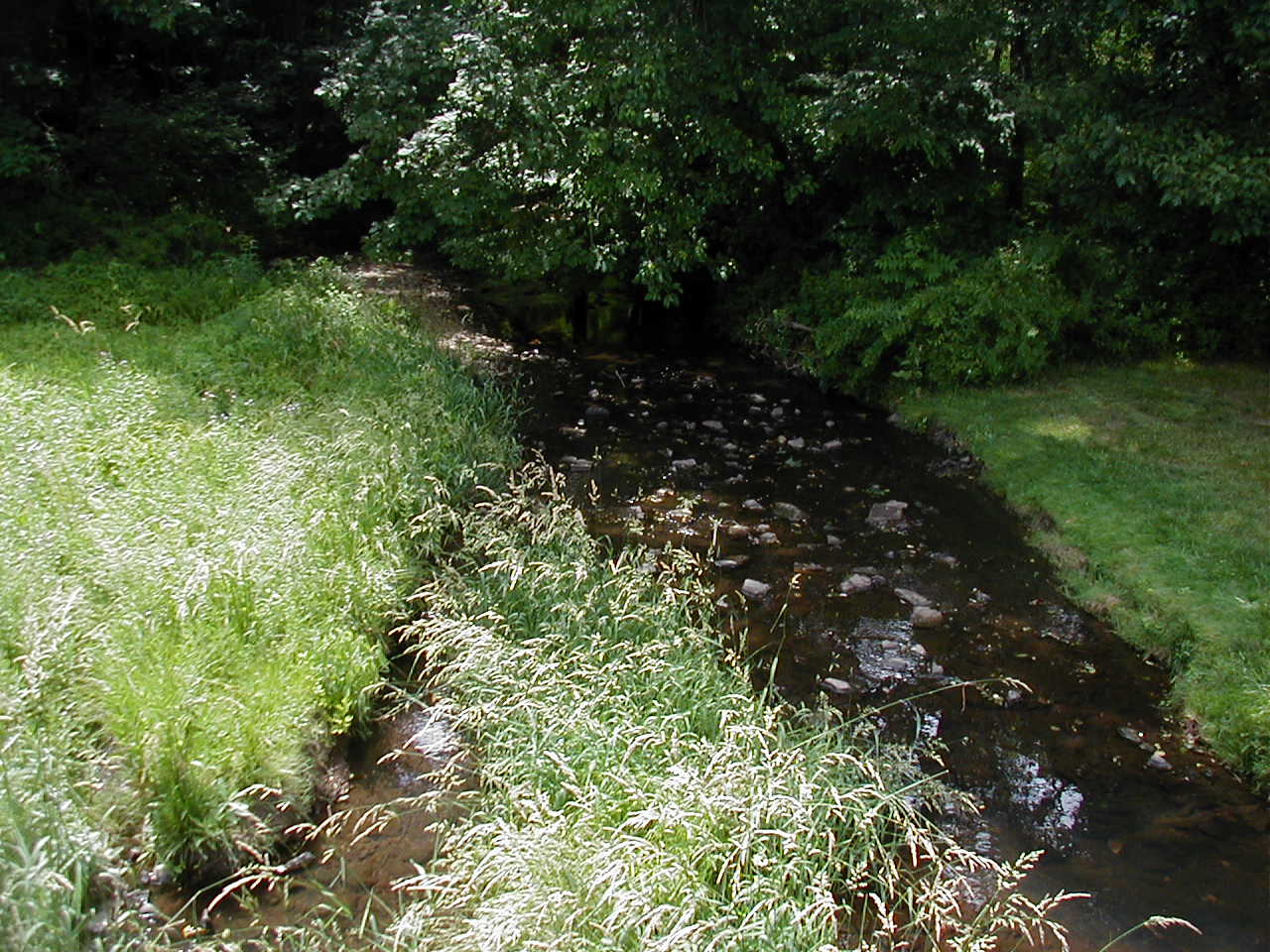
Six Mile Run running through a residential development

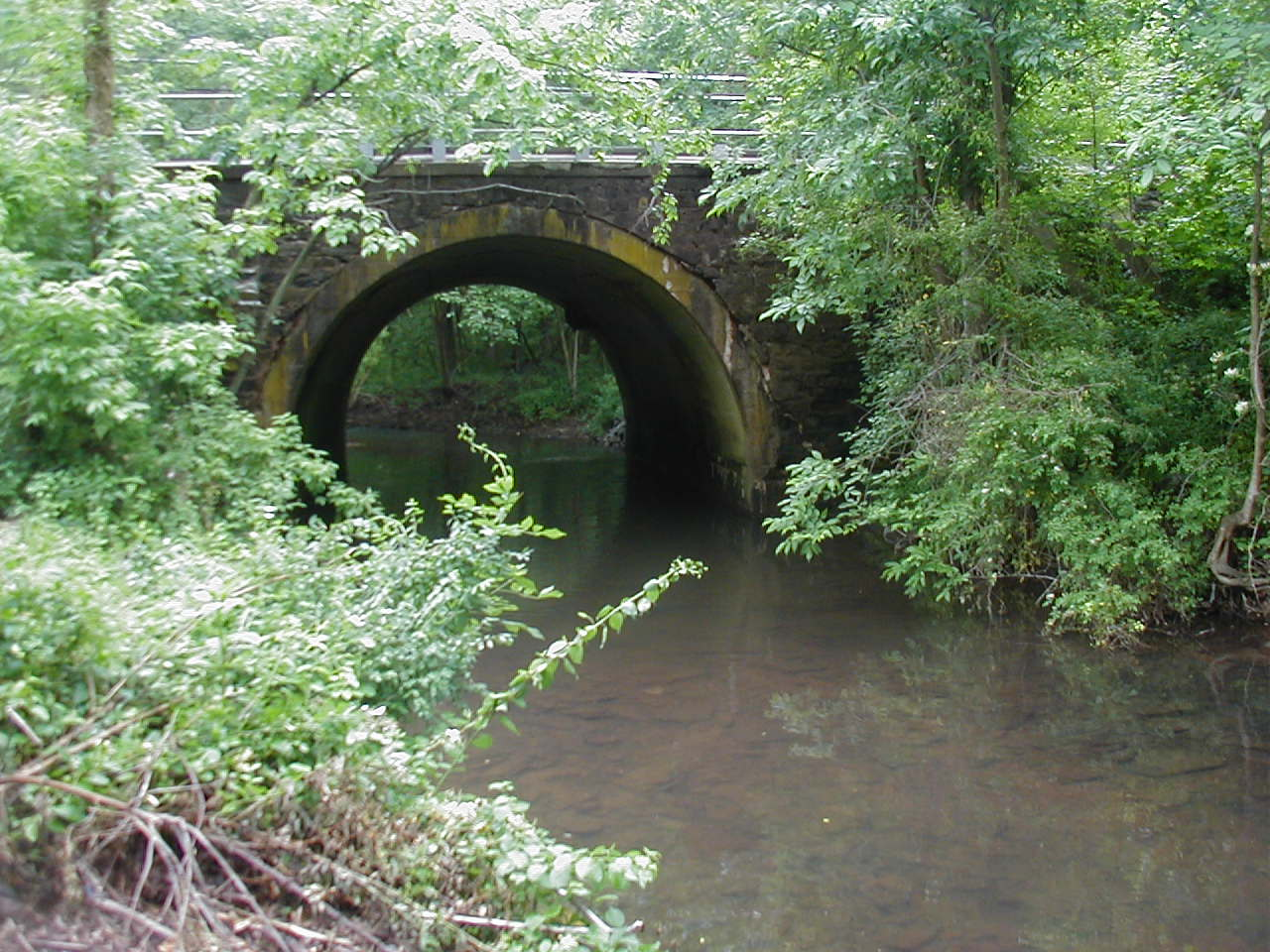
Six Mile Run at Route 27

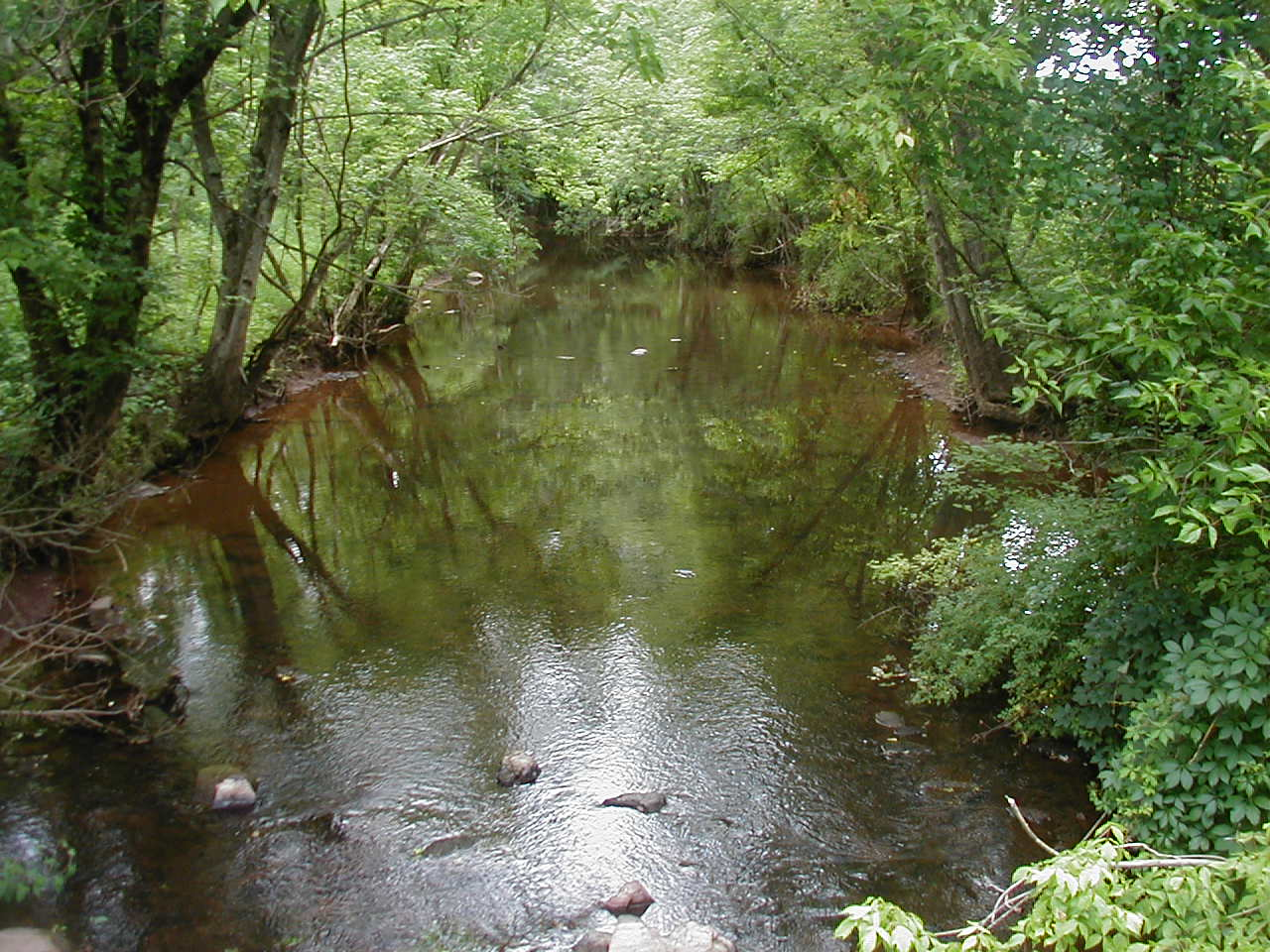
Six Mile Run at South Middlebush Road

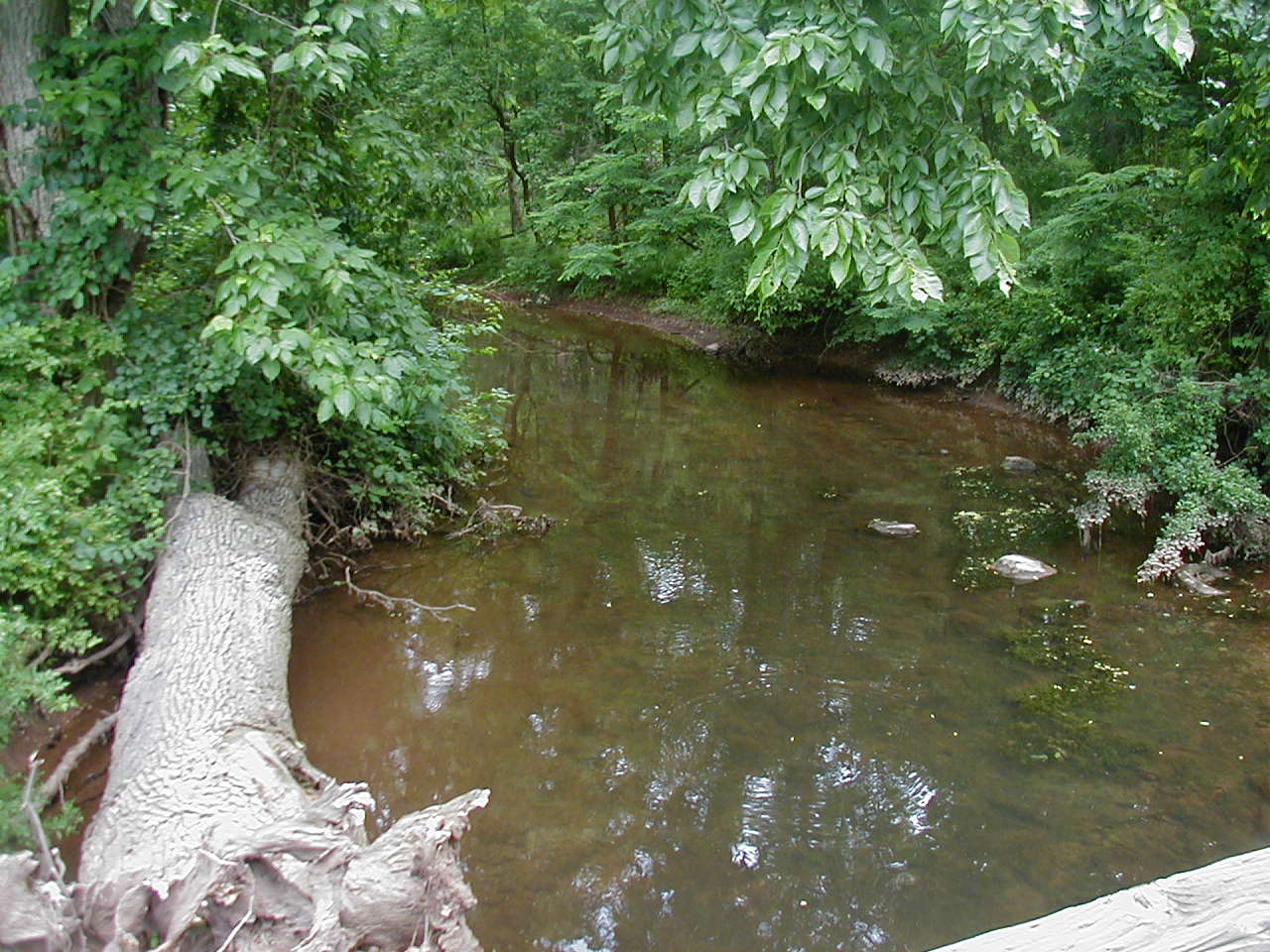
Six Mile Run at South Middlebush Road, other side

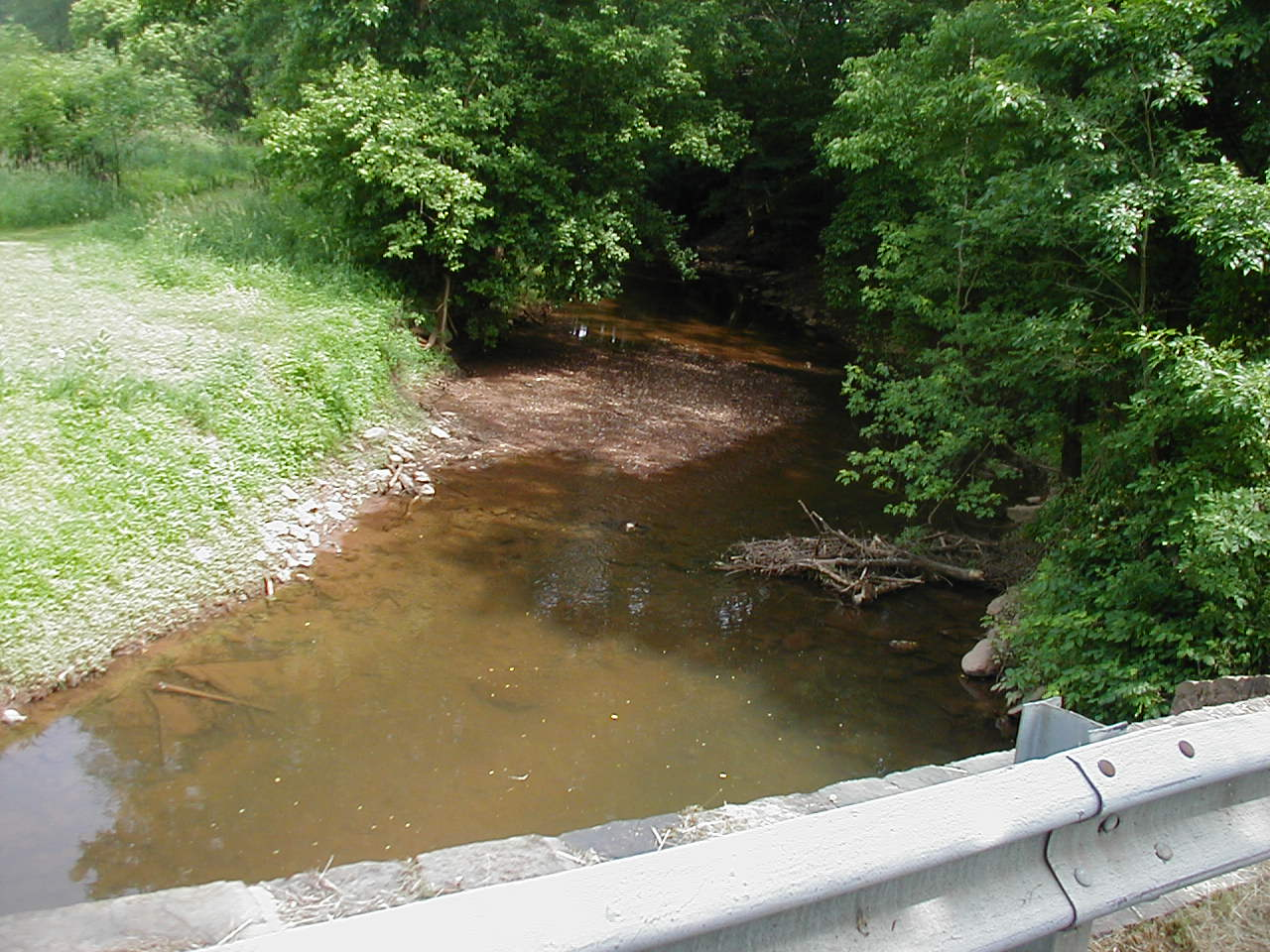
Six Mile Run at Canal Road, near its mouth to the Millstone River

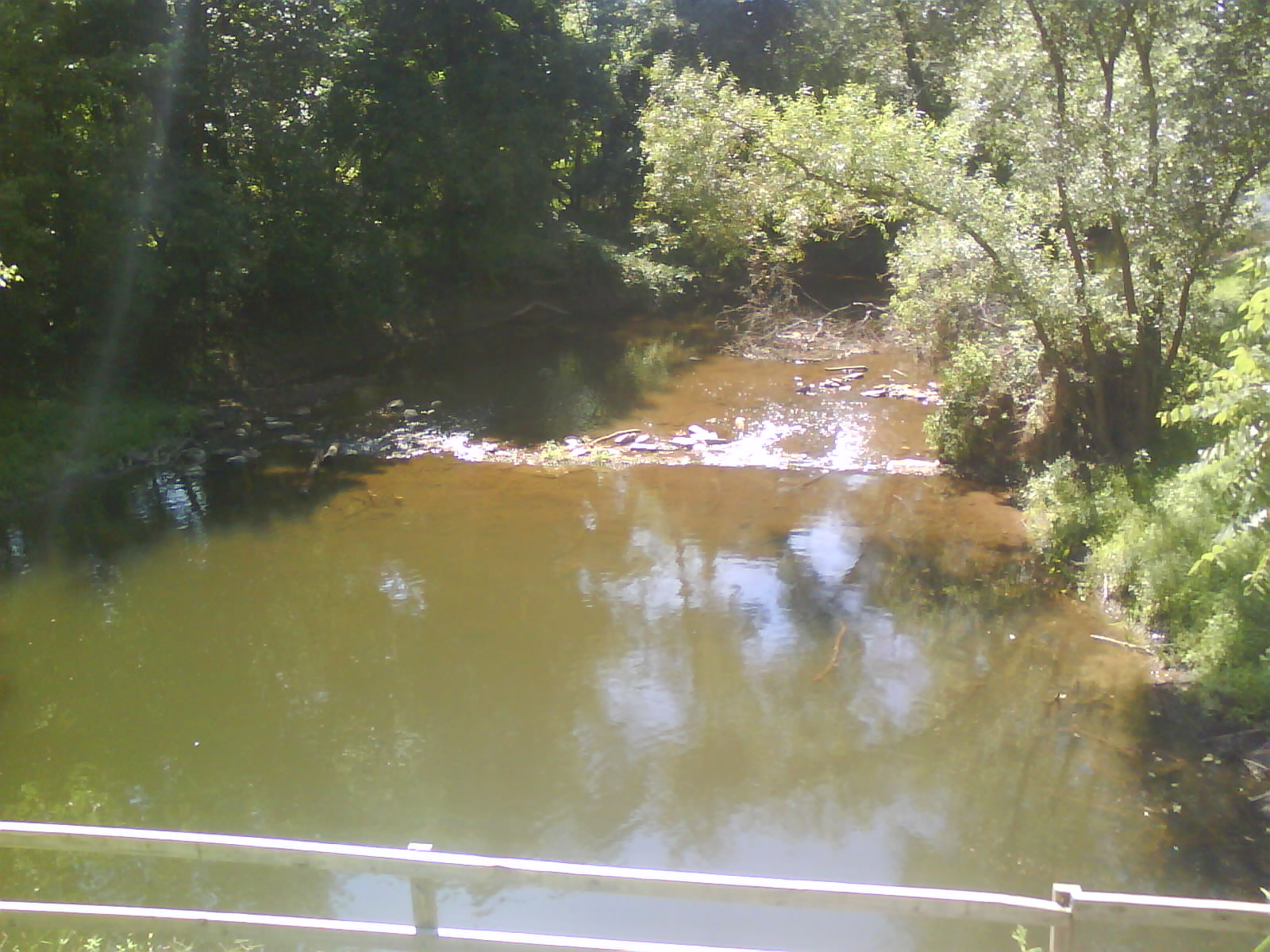
Six Mile Run after the D&R Canal and before the Millstone River, viewed from the canal towpath

== See also ==
- List of rivers of New Jersey
