= Franklin Park, New Jersey =

Populated place in Somerset County, New Jersey, US

- Census-designated place
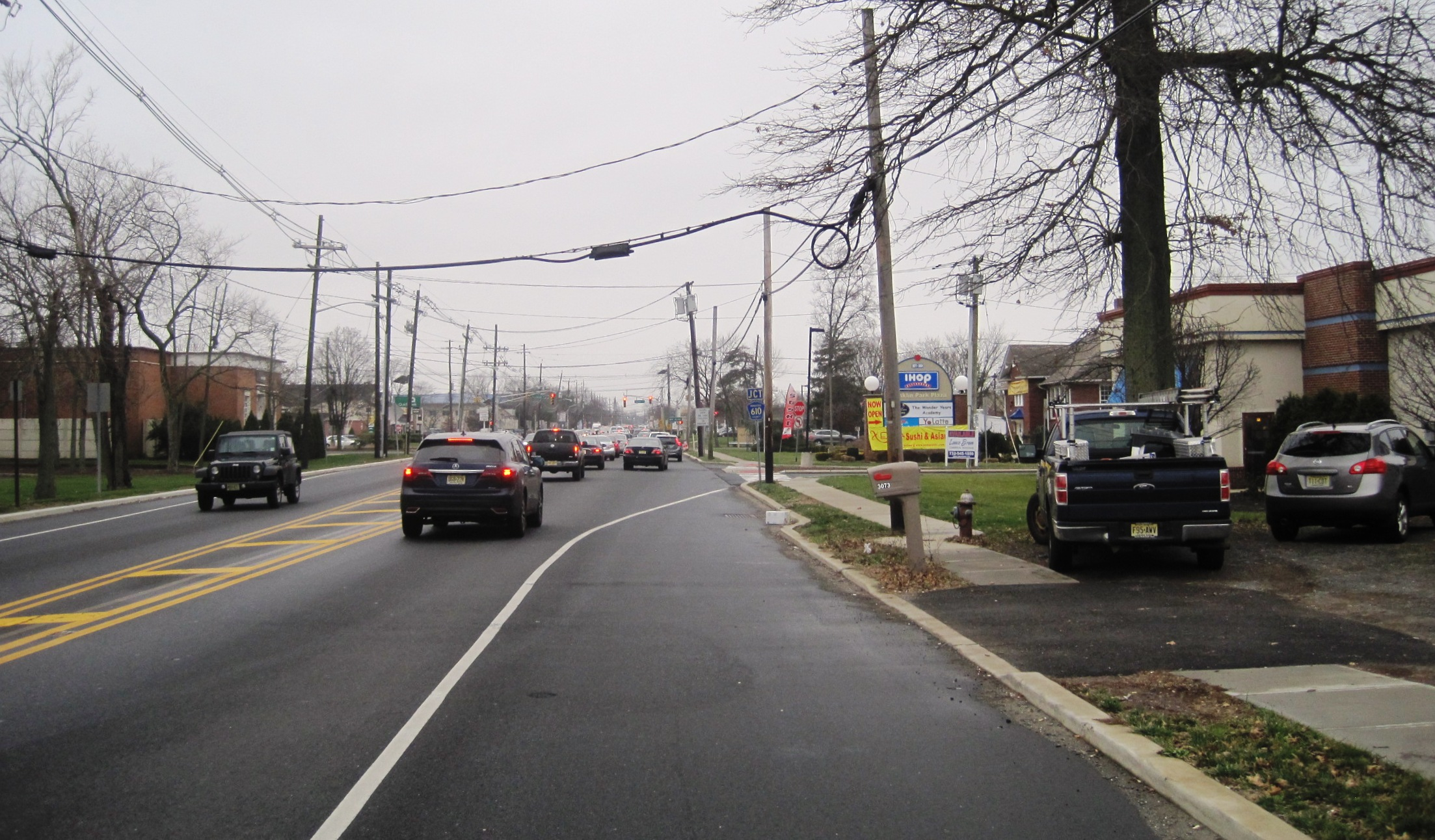
- Looking south along Route 27 in Franklin Park

- Location in Somerset County Location in New Jersey Location in the United States
- Coordinates: 40.444481°N 74.542572°W
- Country: United States
- State: New Jersey
- County: Somerset
- Township: Franklin

Area
  - Total: 2.606 sq mi (6.750 km^{2})
  - Land: 2.605 sq mi (6.746 km^{2})
  - Water: 0.0015 sq mi (0.004 km^{2}) 0.06%
- Elevation: 118 ft (36 m)

Population (2020)
  - Total: 13,430
  - Density: 5,155.5/sq mi (1,990.5/km^{2})
- Time zone: UTC−05:00 (Eastern (EST))
  - Summer (DST): UTC−04:00 (Eastern (EDT))
- ZIP Code: 08823
- Area codes: 732/848
- FIPS code: 34-25020
- GNIS feature ID: 02583991

Franklin Park is an unincorporated community and census-designated place (CDP) located within Franklin Township, in Somerset County, in the U.S. state of New Jersey. As of the 2020 census, Franklin Park had a population of 13,430. Route 27 (historically known as Old Road/King's Highway and once part of the Lincoln Highway system) bisects the village and serves as the dividing line between the two counties. The adjacent sections of South Brunswick and North Brunswick, Middlesex County on the east side of Route 27 are also known as Franklin Park, but are not included within the CDP's boundaries.

The area is served as United States Postal Service ZIP Code 08823.

== History ==
The original name for Franklin Park was "Six Mile Run", which was named for the tributary of the Millstone River that flows through the area and first came to importance about 1710.

In that year a congregation of the Six Mile Run Reformed Church was formed making it the oldest congregation in Franklin Township and remains an important part of the community. The first building was replaced by a new building in 1766 and was later replaced in 1817 by a third structure on the same site. The current building replaced the 1817 church that was destroyed by fire in 1879. The Frelinghuysen Memorial Chapel was added in 1907 and the Fellowship Hall was dedicated in 1958.

Franklin Park, then Six Mile Run, served as the first site of the Somerset County Courthouse and jail from 1714 until 1737 when a fire destroyed the building and the county seat was moved to Millstone, New Jersey. Occasionally Franklin Park was referred to as Somerset Courthouse during the time the courthouse was located here. A commemorative marker is located on Route 27 between Clover Place and Bennington Parkway near the original courthouse site.

Several early taverns were established here and welcomed travelers using King's Highway while headed towards New Brunswick and New York City going north and Princeton, Trenton and Philadelphia going south. Wood's Tavern was operating by 1745 and Gifford's Tavern by the 1760s. John Quincy Adams and Andrew Jackson are known to have stopped at Gifford's Tavern. In 1874, Gifford's Tavern was replaced by the 26-room Beekman's Hotel, aka Franklin House, which operated until it was destroyed by a major fire in 1929. The building occupied by Chauncey's Restaurant (now demolished) was purportedly once a barn of the Beekman's Hotel.

The first post office in Franklin Township was established here in 1826.

The name of the community was formally changed from Six Mile Run to Franklin Park on June 25, 1872.

In the late 19th century in addition to the Beekman's Hotel and another known as Manley's Hotel and the Six Mile Run Reformed Church, the community included a wagon factory, blacksmith, wheelwright, butcher, hay scales, ice house, a school, and a general store called Hullfish's Store, as well as residences for about 110 people.

Today many of the historic commercial buildings are gone but newer commercial buildings have taken their place to serve the rapidly growing population in the surrounding area.

The former Franklin Park School on Route 27, built in 1909, was a two-room building until three more rooms were added in 1931. Renamed the Phillips School in 1954 in honor of Jane E. Phillips, who had earlier invested in a school to be built by that name in honor of her late husband at Ten Mile Run (closed since 1931) and established a trust fund for graduates of the Phillips school to attend New Jersey State Teachers College at Trenton (most recently known as The College of New Jersey), it ceased being used as a public school in 1976. The building was then used by Franklin Township's Recreation Department until 1993 when it was abandoned due to structural problems. After being sold and renovated, it reopened as a privately run pre-school.

The current Franklin Park School section located between Hillview and Central Avenue is the original ten room building constructed in 1957. In 1998, a major expansion, accessed from Eden Road, was completed increasing enrollment capacity from about 130 to over 900 students.

Franklin Park has been served by the Franklin Park Volunteer Fire Company since 1936. Originally housed in the converted South Middlebush one-room schoolhouse that had been relocated to Route 27 in Franklin Park, the company had to build a new building after an oil stove fire destroyed the first firehouse in 1946.

Most of the 2001 anthrax attacks letters had the address of Franklin Park.

== Geography ==
According to the United States Census Bureau, Franklin Park had a total area of 2.607 square miles (6.750 km^{2}), including 2.605 square miles (6.746 km^{2}) of land and 0.002 square miles (0.004 km^{2}) of water (0.06%).

== Demographics ==
Historical population
Census	Pop.	Note	%±
2010	13,295		—
2020	13,430		1.0%
Population sources: 2010 2020

Franklin Park first appeared as a census designated place in the 2010 U.S. census.

=== Racial and ethnic composition ===
Franklin Park CDP, New Jersey – Racial and ethnic composition Note: the US Census treats Hispanic/Latino as an ethnic category. This table excludes Latinos from the racial categories and assigns them to a separate category. Hispanics/Latinos may be of any race.
Race / Ethnicity (NH = Non-Hispanic)	Pop 2010	Pop 2020	% 2010	% 2020
White alone (NH)	3,691	2,953	27.76%	21.99%
Black or African American alone (NH)	3,527	3,727	26.53%	27.75%
Native American or Alaska Native alone (NH)	27	10	0.20%	0.07%
Asian alone (NH)	4,581	4,835	34.46%	36.00%
Native Hawaiian or Pacific Islander alone (NH)	0	4	0.00%	0.03%
Other race alone (NH)	39	79	0.29%	0.59%
Mixed race or Multiracial (NH)	390	413	2.93%	3.08%
Hispanic or Latino (any race)	1,040	1,409	7.82%	10.49%
Total	13,295	13,430	100.00%	100.00%

=== 2020 census ===
As of the 2020 census, Franklin Park had a population of 13,430. The median age was 38.5 years. 20.4% of residents were under the age of 18 and 11.5% were 65 years of age or older. For every 100 females, there were 86.9 males, and for every 100 females age 18 and over, there were 82.3 males age 18 and over.

99.7% of residents lived in urban areas, while 0.3% lived in rural areas.

There were 5,328 households in Franklin Park, of which 32.3% had children under the age of 18 living in them. Of all households, 46.1% were married-couple households, 15.3% were households with a male householder and no spouse or partner present, and 32.1% were households with a female householder and no spouse or partner present. About 26.8% of all households were made up of individuals and 7.0% had someone living alone who was 65 years of age or older.

There were 5,566 housing units, of which 4.3% were vacant. The homeowner vacancy rate was 1.4% and the rental vacancy rate was 4.8%.

=== 2010 census ===
The 2010 United States census counted 13,295 people, 5,310 households, and 3,478 families in the CDP. The population density was 5,104.3 per square mile (1,970.8/km^{2}). There were 5,529 housing units at an average density of 2,122.7 per square mile (819.6/km^{2}). The racial makeup was 31.87% (4,237) White, 27.34% (3,635) Black or African American, 0.33% (44) Native American, 34.53% (4,591) Asian, 0.00% (0) Pacific Islander, 2.29% (305) from other races, and 3.63% (483) from two or more races. Hispanic or Latino of any race were 7.82% (1,040) of the population.

Of the 5,310 households, 34.7% had children under the age of 18; 49.1% were married couples living together; 12.9% had a female householder with no husband present and 34.5% were non-families. Of all households, 27.8% were made up of individuals and 3.4% had someone living alone who was 65 years of age or older. The average household size was 2.48 and the average family size was 3.09.

22.9% of the population were under the age of 18, 5.9% from 18 to 24, 40.6% from 25 to 44, 23.5% from 45 to 64, and 7.1% who were 65 years of age or older. The median age was 34.6 years. For every 100 females, the population had 87.9 males. For every 100 females ages 18 and older there were 83.0 males.

== Notable people ==
People who were born in, residents of, or otherwise closely associated with Franklin Park include:

- Clifford P. Case (1904–1982), member of the U.S. Senate for 18 years and a member of the U.S. House of Representatives before that, who spent his childhood in Franklin Park while his father served as the minister at the Reformed Church.
- Bruce Williams (1932-2019), radio host and former mayor of Franklin Township.
