= Clarksburg, New Jersey =

Populated place in Monmouth County, New Jersey, US

- Unincorporated community
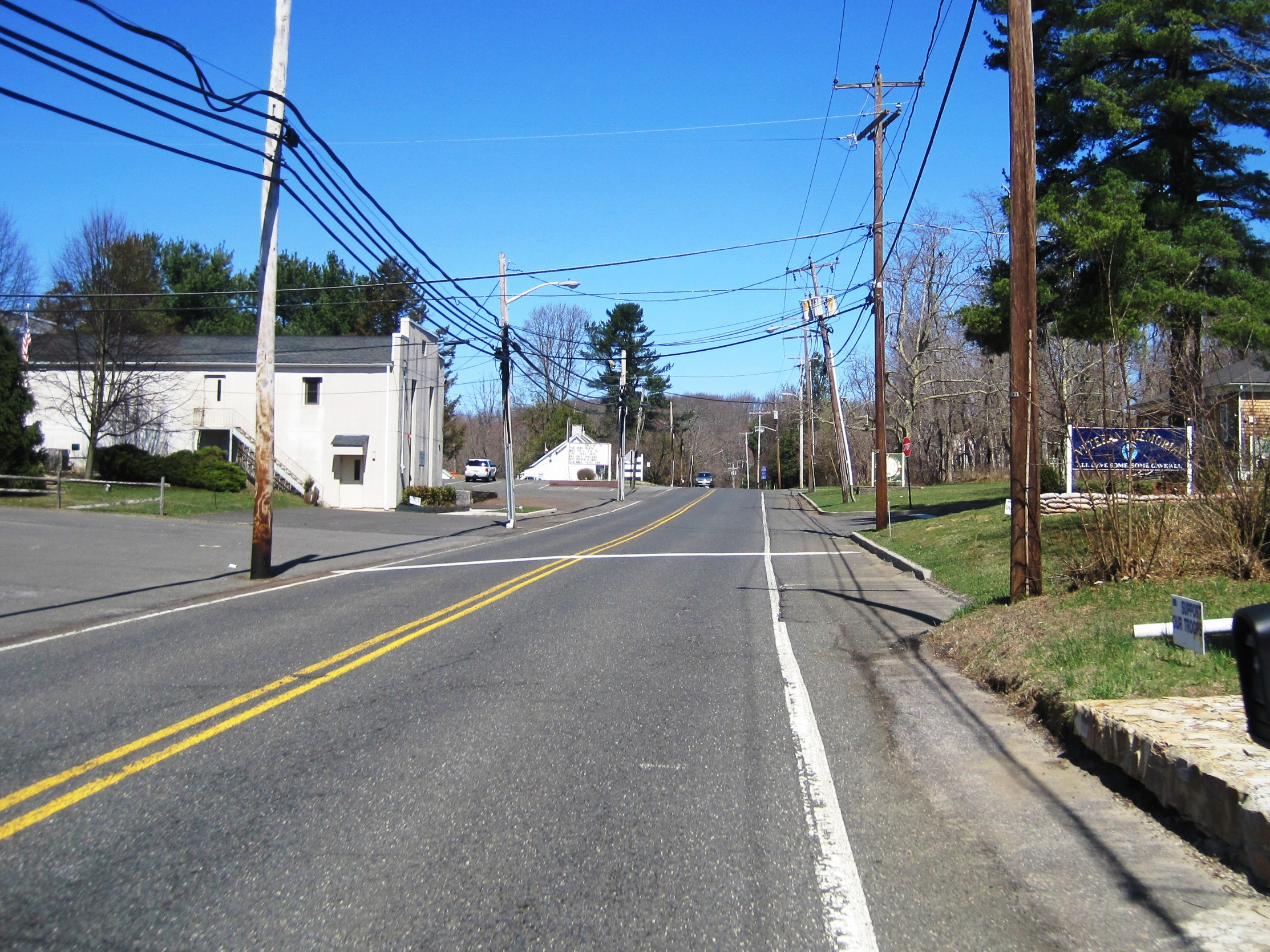
- Center of Clarksburg along Stage Coach Road

- Location in Monmouth County (Inset: Monmouth County in New Jersey) Clarksburg (New Jersey) Clarksburg (the United States)
- Coordinates: 40°11′19″N 74°26′27″W
- Country: United States
- State: New Jersey
- County: Monmouth
- Township: Millstone
- Elevation: 187 ft (57 m)
- ZIP code: 08510
- GNIS feature ID: 0875468

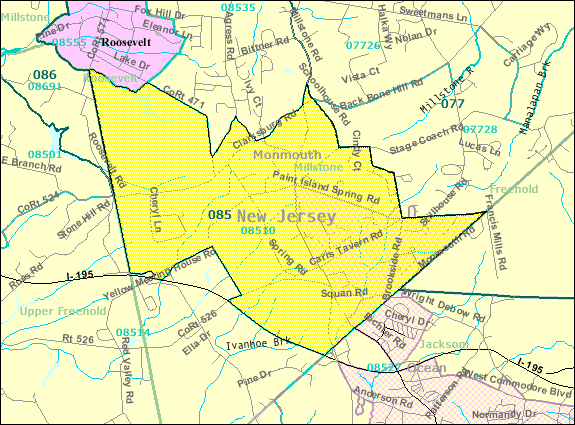
United States Census Bureau map of ZCTA 08510 Clarksburg, New Jersey

Clarksburg is an unincorporated community located within Millstone Township in Monmouth County, in the U.S. state of New Jersey. The area is served as United States Postal Service ZIP code 08510.

As of the 2000 United States census, the population for ZIP Code Tabulation Area 08510 was 2,128.

Clarksburg is located 187 feet (57 m) above sea level.

== Historic sites ==
Clarksburg Methodist Episcopal Church (added in 1999 as Building #99000084) and Clarksburg School (also added in 1999, as Building #99001316) are listed on the National Register of Historic Places.

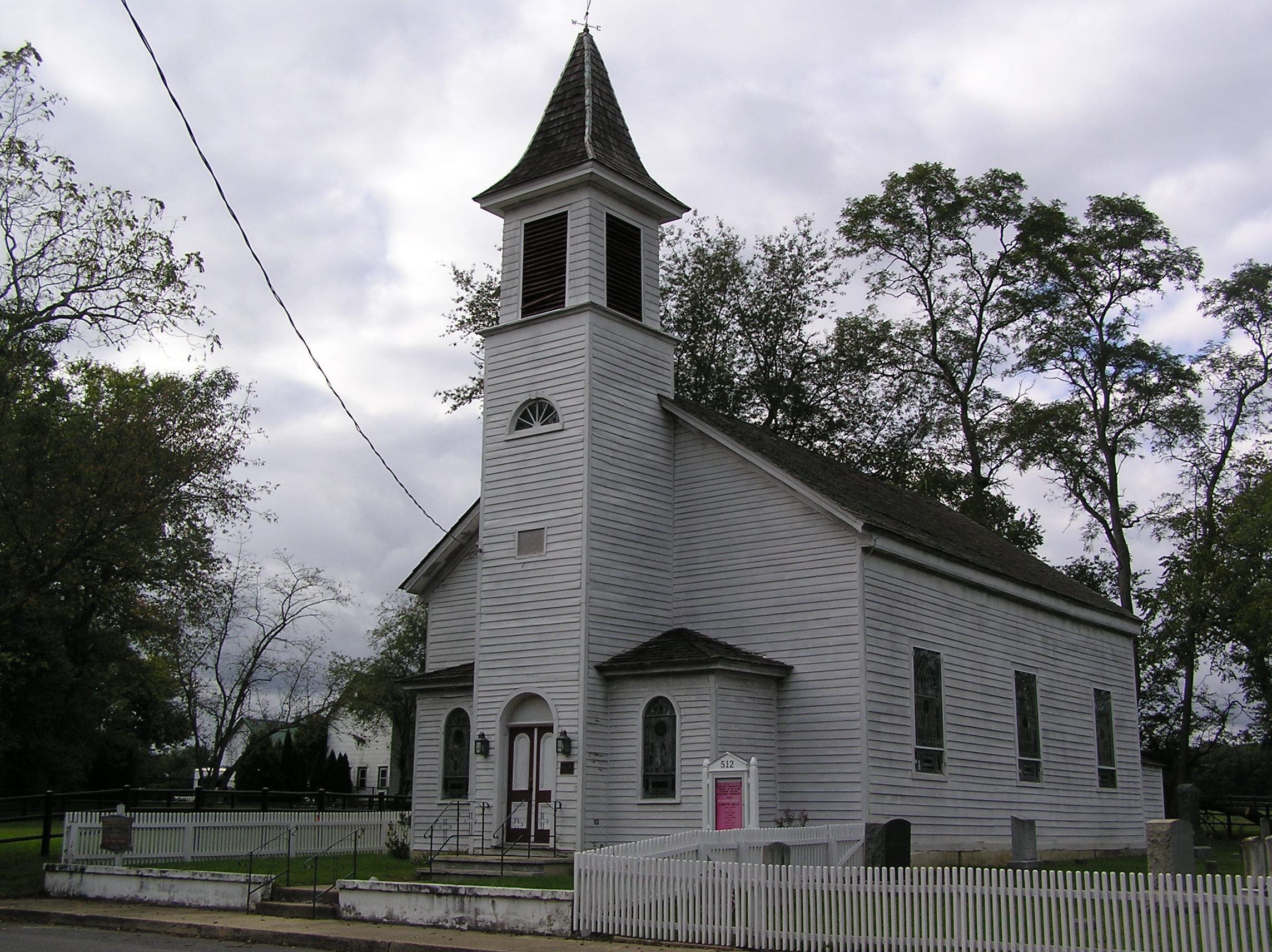
Clarksburg Methodist Episcopal Church

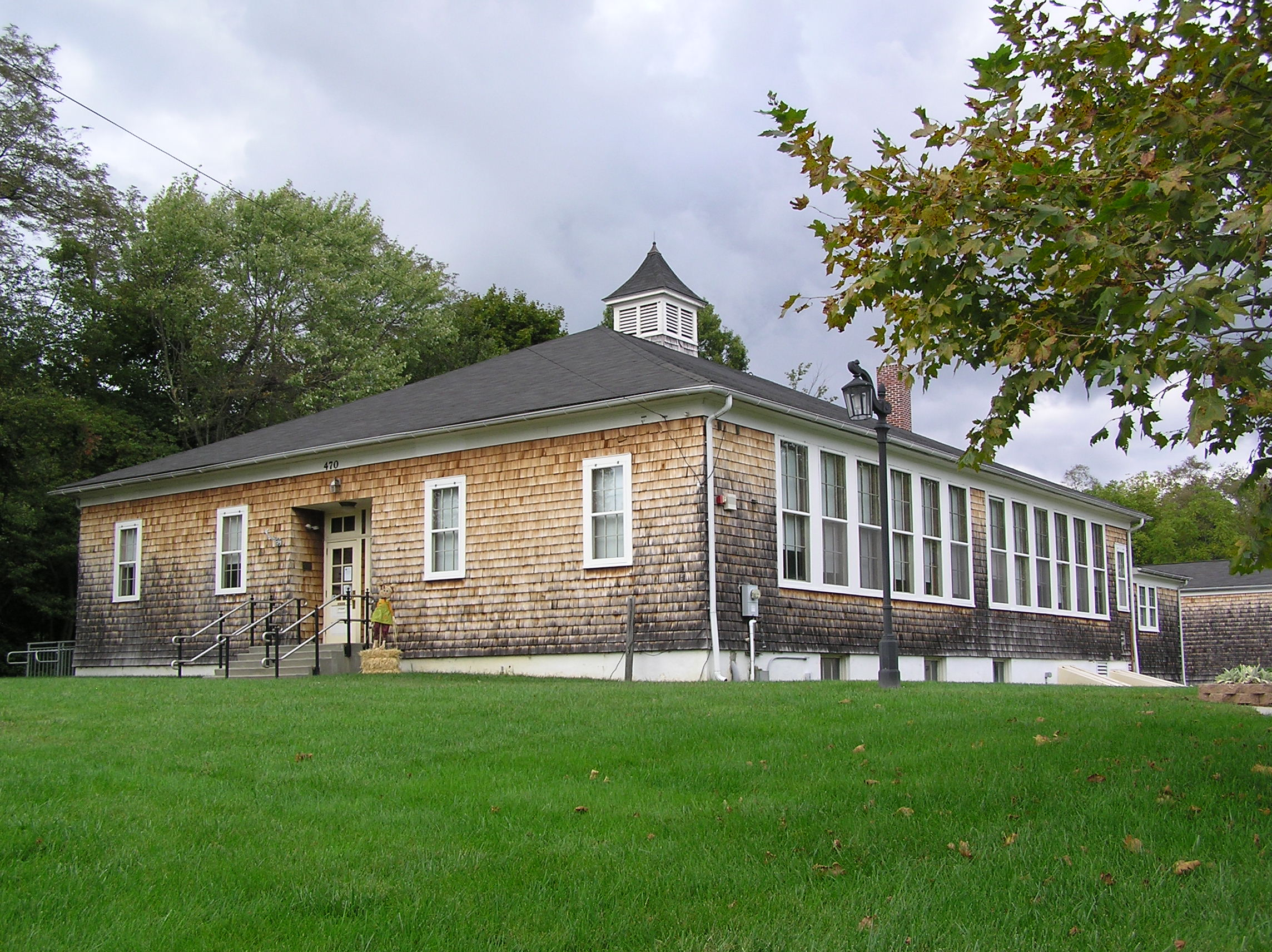
Clarksburg School now the Millstone Municipal Building

== Notable people ==
People who were born in, residents of, or otherwise closely associated with Clarksburg include:

- J. R. Smith (born 1985), National Basketball Association player with the Cleveland Cavaliers.
- Darrin Winston (1966–2008), Major League Baseball player who played two seasons for the Philadelphia Phillies.

== Nearby historic communities ==
- Adelphia in Howell Township
- The Cassville Crossroads Historic District in Jackson Township
- Cookstown in North Hanover Township
- Dutch Neck in West Windsor Township
- Imlaystown in Upper Freehold Township
- Jerseyville in Howell Township
- Lawrenceville in Lawrence Township (Mercer County)
- Leisure Village West in Manchester Township
- Marlboro in Marlboro Township
- Monmouth Junction in South Brunswick
- The Monmouth Battlefield Historic District in Freehold Township and Manalapan Township
- Kingston in Franklin Township and South Brunswick
- New Egypt in Plumsted Township
- Old Bridge in East Brunswick
- Perrineville in Millstone Township
- Plainsboro Center in Plainsboro Township
- The Princeton Battlefield Historic District in Princeton
- Princeton Junction in West Windsor Township
- Tennent in Manalapan Township
- West Freehold in Freehold Township
