= Fair Play, New Jersey =

Populated place in Monmouth County, New Jersey, US

- Unincorporated community
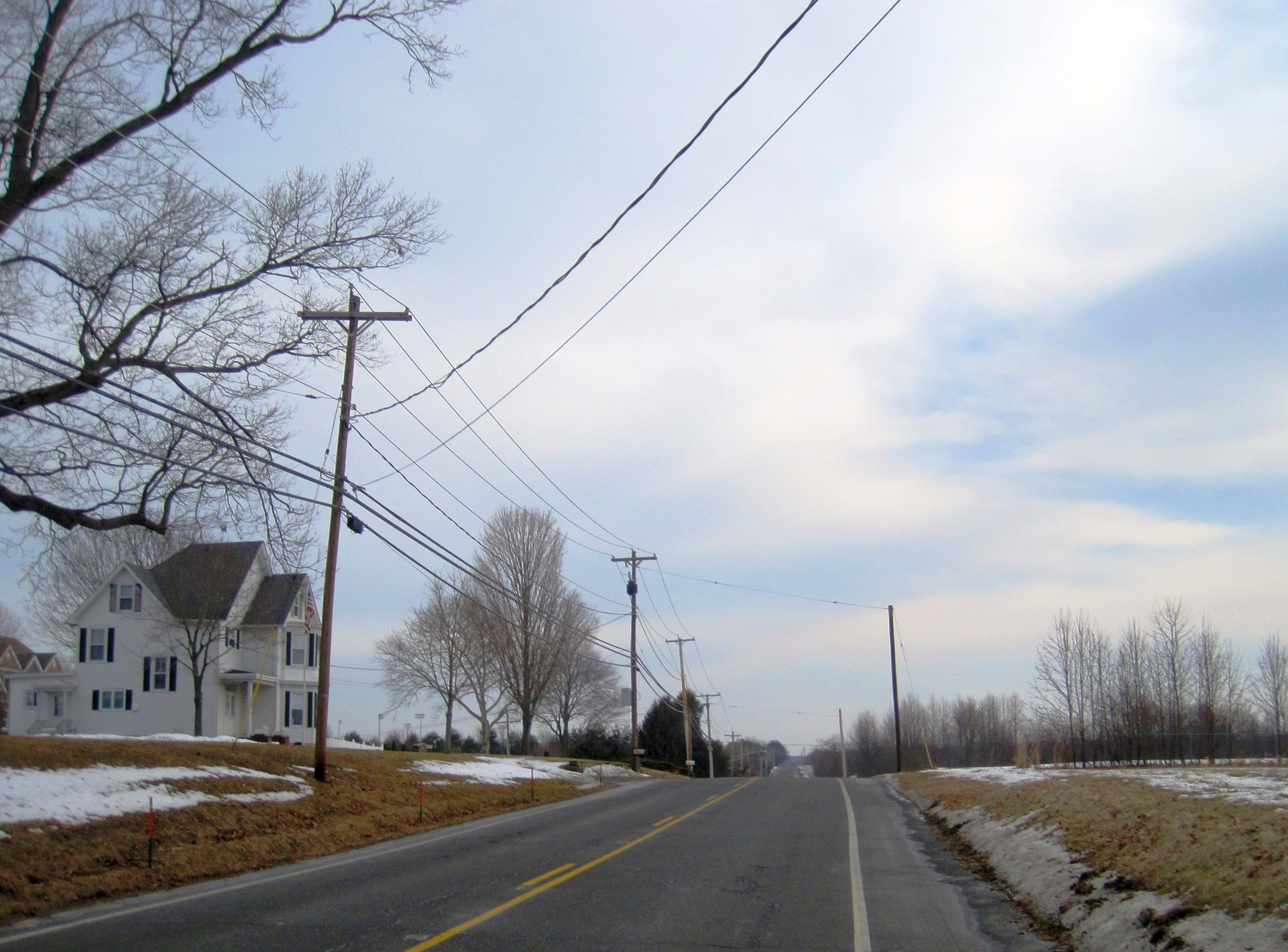
- Fair Play as seen from eastbound CR 1

- Location in Monmouth County (Inset: Monmouth County in New Jersey) Fair Play (New Jersey) Fair Play (the United States)
- Coordinates: 40°14′12″N 74°27′53″W
- Country: United States
- State: New Jersey
- County: Monmouth
- Township: Millstone
- Elevation: 144 ft (44 m)
- GNIS feature ID: 882916

Fair Play is a rural unincorporated community in Millstone Township, Monmouth County, in the U.S. state of New Jersey. It is just south of Disbrow Hill and north of Rocky Brook on County Route 1 (Perrineville Road) at Fairplay Road, west of Perrineville and southeast of Hightstown.

== History ==
The school district in Fair Play had 48 children attending in 1892, and a school house existed in 1889. Since the 1980s, much of the area has been developed as single-family homes in subdivisions.
