= Ely, New Jersey =

Populated place in Monmouth County, New Jersey, US

- Unincorporated community
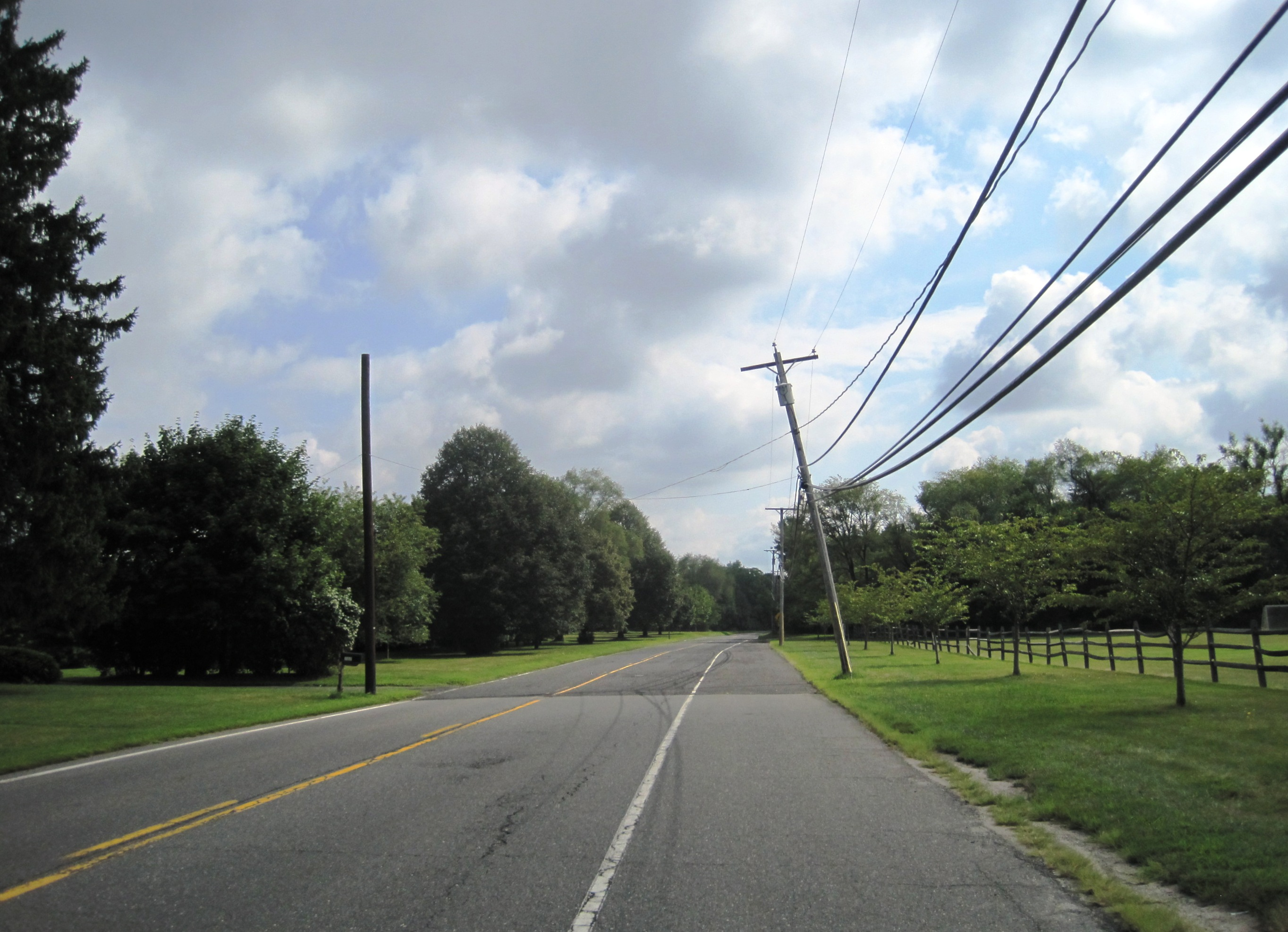
- Along Stage Coach Road (CR 524)

- Location in Monmouth County. Inset: Location of county within the state of New Jersey Ely (New Jersey) Ely (the United States)
- Coordinates: 40°12′11″N 74°23′14″W
- Country: United States
- State: New Jersey
- County: Monmouth
- Township: Millstone
- Elevation: 200 ft (61 m)
- GNIS feature ID: 876181

Ely is an unincorporated community located within Millstone Township in Monmouth County, in the U.S. state of New Jersey. The settlement is named for the Ely family that owned property in the area and operated the Charleston Springs hotel. Today, the settlement is located along Stage Coach Road, County Route 524, in the eastern portion of the township. Most of the area consists of large single-family homes though some farmland and the township-owned Brandywine Soccer Complex are located in the near the settlement.
