= Clarksburg School (Clarksburg, New Jersey) =

- U.S. National Register of Historic Places
- New Jersey Register of Historic Places
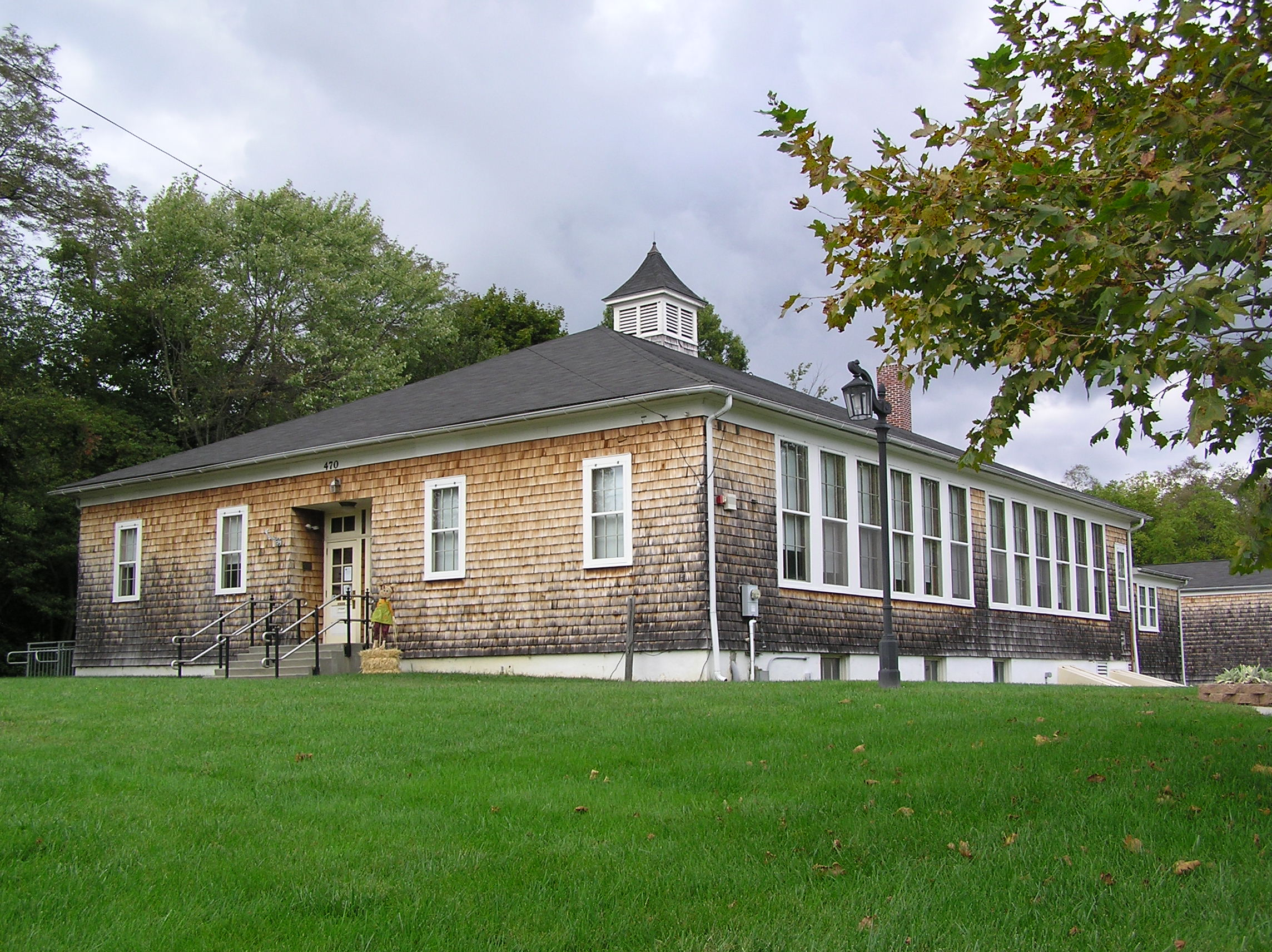

- Location within Monmouth County, New Jersey Location within New Jersey Location within the United States
- Nearest city: Clarksburg, New Jersey
- Coordinates: 40°11′28″N 74°26′33″W
- Area: 2 acres (0.81 ha)
- Built: 1925
- Architect: Conover, Warren H.
- NRHP reference No.: 99001316
- NJRHP No.: 143

Significant dates
- Added to NRHP: November 12, 1999
- Designated NJRHP: September 29, 1999

The Clarksburg School is located in the Clarksburg section of Millstone Township, Monmouth County, New Jersey, United States. The school, designed in a vernacular fashion by Warren H. Conover, was built in 1925 as a four-room schoolhouse. Two additional classrooms were later added on through additions. The school eventually closed in 1995. Following renovations, the building became the municipal building for Millstone, housing the township's administrator, clerk, and finances. It was added to the National Register of Historic Places on November 12, 1999.

== See also ==
- National Register of Historic Places listings in Monmouth County, New Jersey
