= Stone Tavern =

Stone Tavern may refer to:

- Stone Tavern, New Jersey, United States
- Stone Tavern at Roney's Point in West Virginia, United States
