= Rocky Brook =

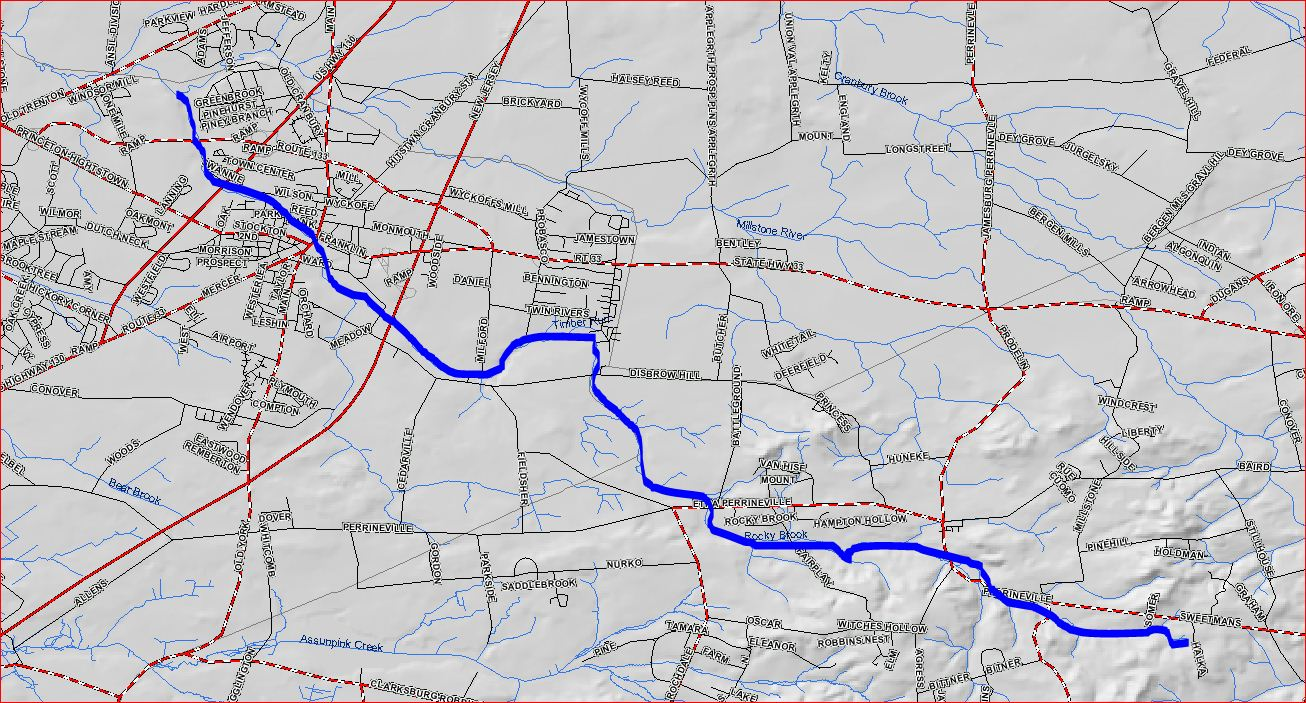
- Map of Rocky Brook

Location
- Country: United States

Physical characteristics
- Source
  - coordinates: 40°13′8″N 74°24′37″W
- Mouth
  - coordinates: 40°17′18″N 74°32′23″W
  - elevation: 79 ft (24 m)

Basin features
- Progression: Millstone River, Raritan River, Atlantic Ocean
- River system: Raritan River system
- Tributaries
  - right: Timber Run

Rocky Brook is a tributary of the Millstone River in Monmouth and Mercer counties, New Jersey, in the United States.

== Course ==
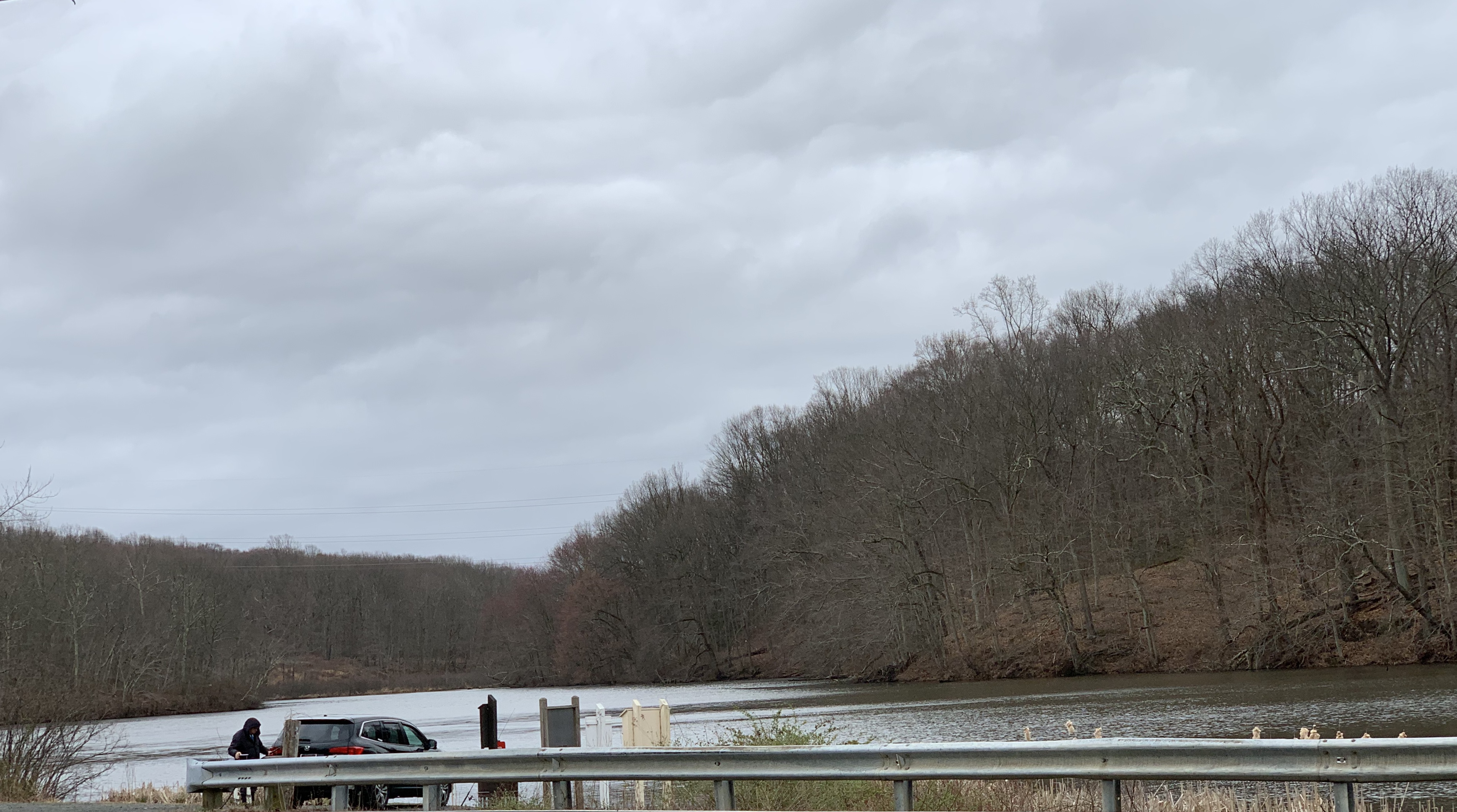
Perrineville Lake, the headwaters for Rocky Brook

Rocky Brook starts at 40°13′8″N 74°24′37″W, near Perrineville. It flows parallel to CR-1 (Sweetmans Lane) before draining into Perrineville Lake. It continues flowing west into the northern areas of Perrineville Lake Park. It then turns northwest and crosses Perrineville Road and flows through the Etra Road Open Space area. It crosses Disbrow Hill Road and drains into the Etra Lake at 40°15′13″N 74°29′59″W.

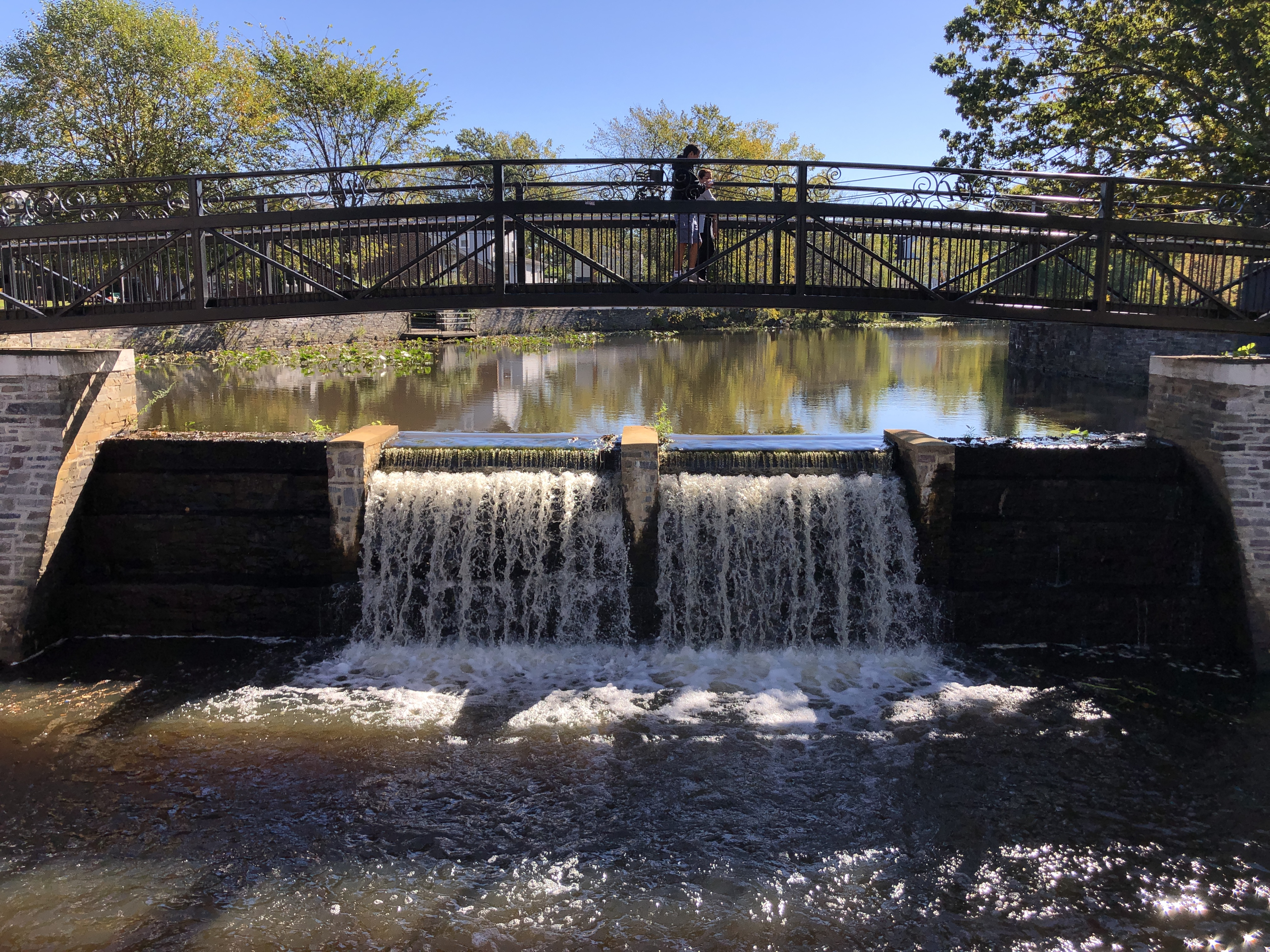
Spillway at Peddie Lake

It continues flowing west alongside Etra Road and crosses the New Jersey Turnpike. It then flows into Peddie Lake in the heart of Hightstown. It crosses Route 33 and flows past the Town Center Plaza and Shopping Center before crossing Route 130 and the Hightstown Bypass. It then flows alongside the East Windsor Open Space Acquisition before draining into the Millstone River at 40°17′18″N 74°32′23″W.

== Tributaries ==
- Timber Run

=== Lakes ===
There are several lakes that flow along the course of the brook. These include:

- Perrineville Lake in Millstone
- Etra Lake in East Windsor
- Peddie Lake in Hightstown (in which it receives its namesake from the nearby Peddie School)

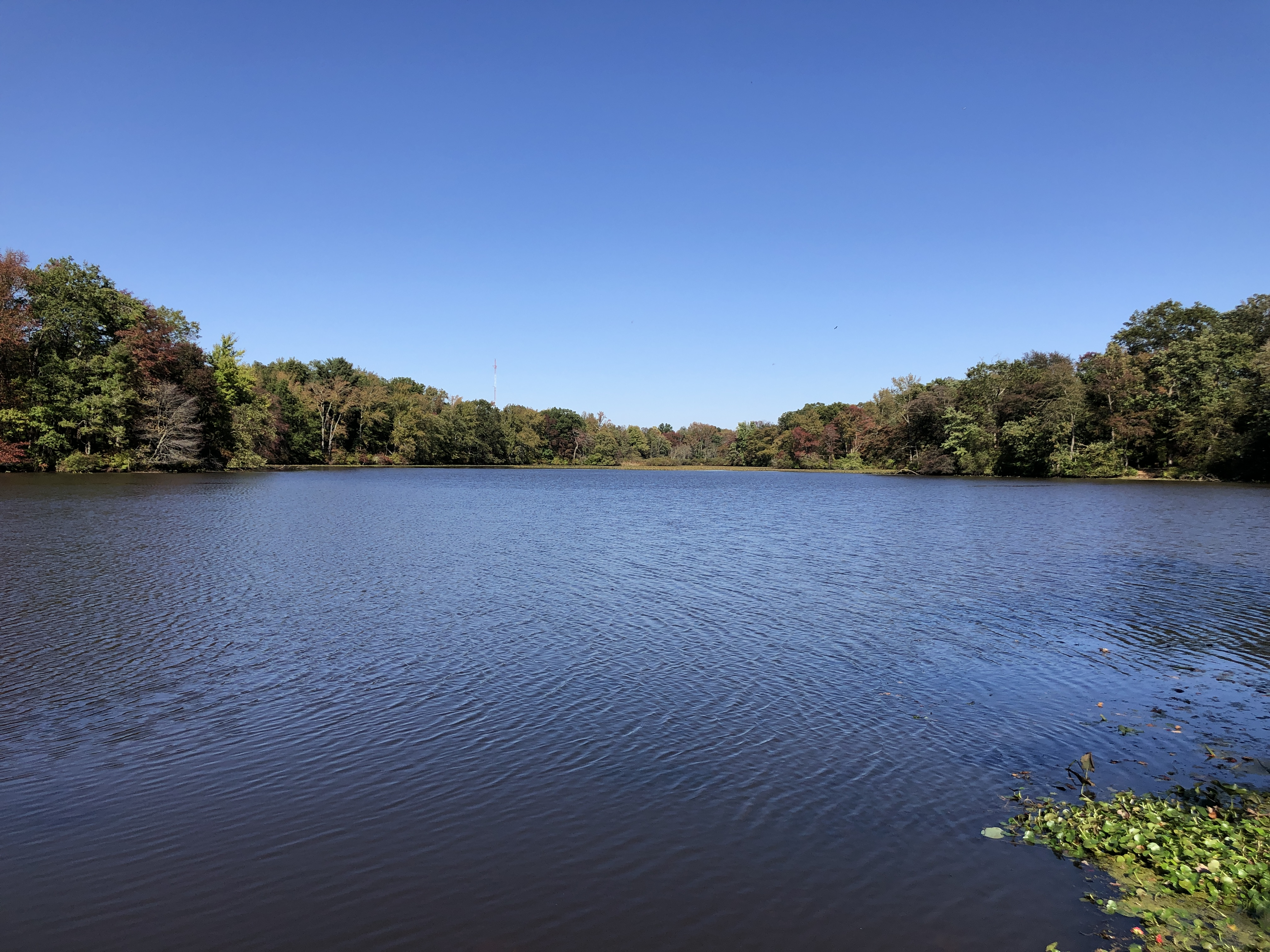
Etra Lake

=== Sister tributaries ===
Rocky Brook's sister tributaries include:

- Beden Brook
- Bear Brook
- Cranbury Brook
- Devils Brook
  - Shallow Brook
- Harrys Brook
- Heathcote Brook
- Indian Run Brook
- Little Bear Brook
- Millstone Brook
- Peace Brook
- Royce Brook
- Simonson Brook
- Six Mile Run
- Stony Brook
- Ten Mile Run
- Van Horn Brook

== See also ==
- List of rivers of New Jersey
