= Clarksburg Methodist Episcopal Church =

Historic church in New Jersey, United States

- U.S. National Register of Historic Places
- New Jersey Register of Historic Places
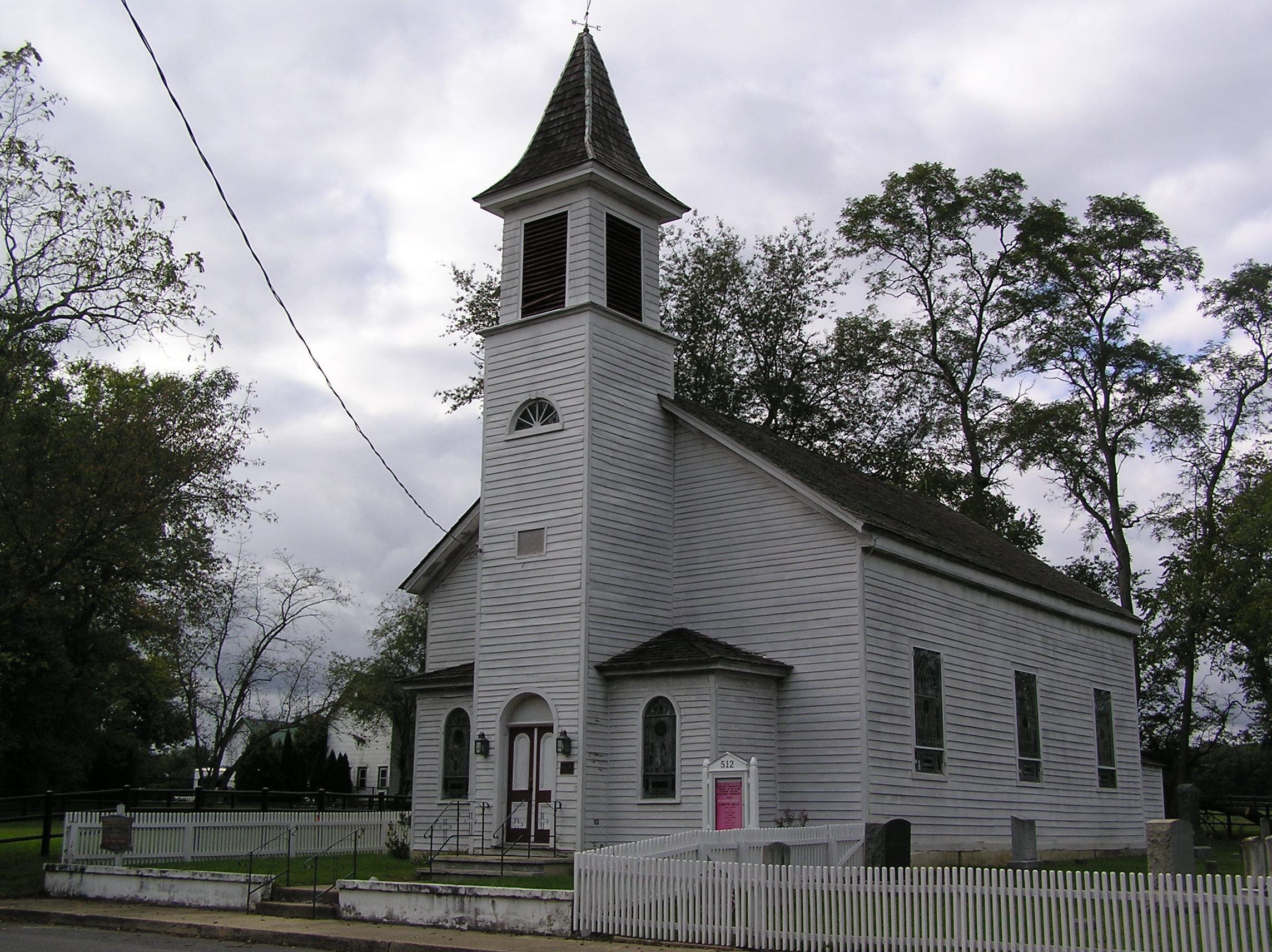

- Location within Monmouth County, New Jersey Location within New Jersey Location within the United States
- Location: 512 Cty Rd. 524, Millstone Township, New Jersey
- Coordinates: 40°11′29″N 74°27′5″W
- Area: 0.5 acres (0.20 ha)
- Built: 1845
- Architect: Thomas Gravitt
- Architectural style: Mid 19th Century Revival
- NRHP reference No.: 99000084
- NJRHP No.: 3364

Significant dates
- Added to NRHP: February 5, 1999
- Designated NJRHP: December 23, 1998

Clarksburg Methodist Episcopal Church (also known as Clarksburg United Methodist Church) is a historic Methodist church at 512 County Road 524 in Millstone Township, Monmouth County, New Jersey, United States.

The church was built in 1845 in a Mid-19th Century Revival style. The building was added to the National Register of Historic Places in 1999.
