= Timber Run =

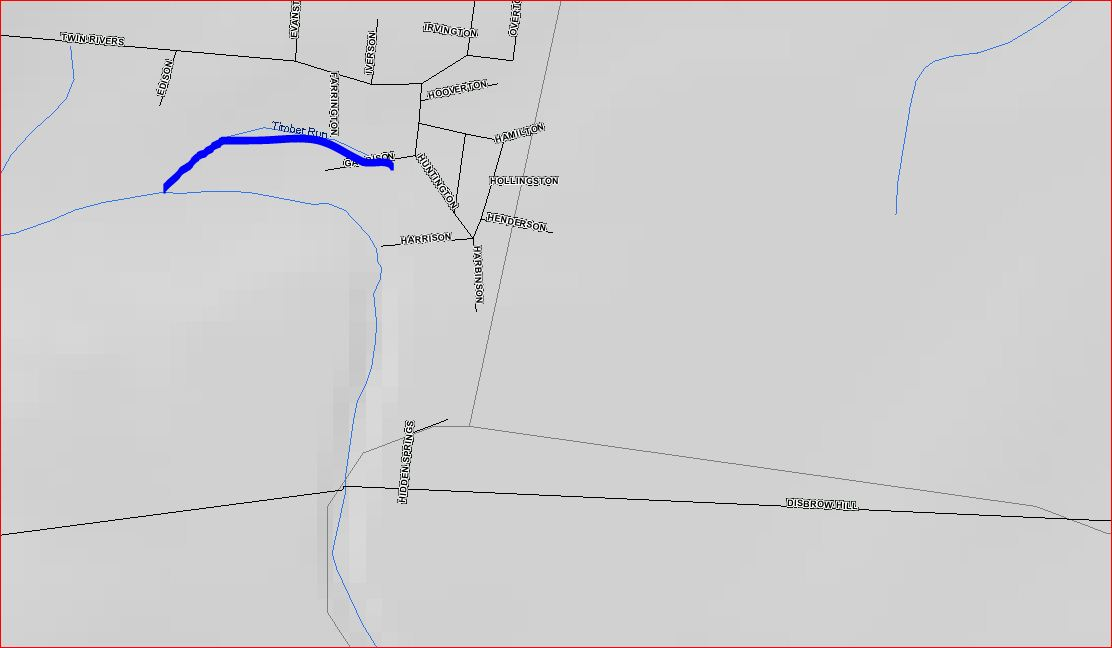
- Map of Timber Run

Physical characteristics
- Source
  - coordinates: 40°15′41″N 74°29′2″W
- Mouth
  - coordinates: 40°15′30″N 74°29′26″W
  - elevation: 108 ft (33 m)

Basin features
- Progression: Rocky Brook, Millstone River, Raritan River, Atlantic Ocean
- River system: Raritan River system

Timber Run is a tributary of Rocky Brook in Mercer County, New Jersey in the United States.

== Course ==
Timber Run starts at 40°15′41″N 74°29′2″W, in a housing development near Franklin Street (SR-33). It flows south and drains into Quad II Lake, which drains into Rocky Brook at 40°15′30″N 74°29′26″W.

== Another nearby creek ==
Another tributary to Rocky Brook that runs nearby is also called Timber Run. This one starts in the middle of a field between Lake Drive and the original alignment of Milford Rd. It flows west-northwest to a point behind a restaurant located a few hundred feet east of the New Jersey Turnpike. From there, the creek turns west-southwest, and continues until it drains into a narrow recessed section of Peddie Lake. Much of this stream is culverted, and parts of its route are diverted around local businesses and Interchange 8 of the Turnpike.

== See also ==
- List of rivers of New Jersey
