= Theresa Miskimen =

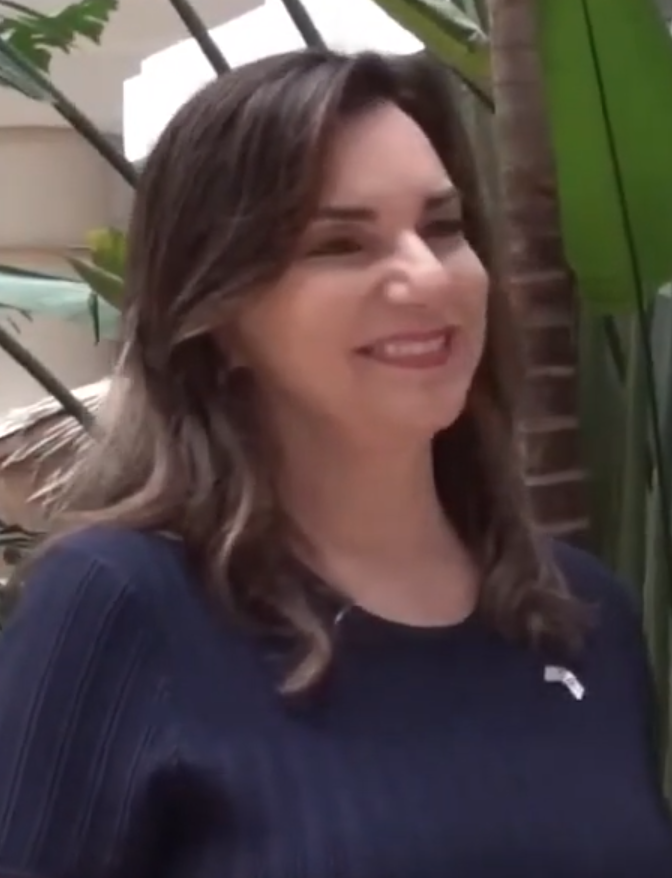
- Miskimen in 2025
- Born: Mayagüez, Puerto Rico
- Education: University of Puerto Rico (BS); University of Puerto Rico School of Medicine (MD)
- Children: 2
- Scientific career
- Fields: Psychiatry
- Institutions: Rutgers University

Theresa M. Miskimen Rivera is a Puerto Rican psychiatrist and professor. She is a clinical professor of psychiatry at Robert Wood Johnson Medical School and serves as the chair and medical director of the department of psychiatry at Hunterdon Medical Center. Miskimen Rivera became the president of the American Psychiatric Association (APA) in May 2025 for the 2025 to 2026 term. She is the first Puerto Rican to hold the position.

== Early life and education ==
Miskimen Rivera was born in Mayagüez, Puerto Rico, the second of four daughters. Her mother was a plant pathologist and her father an entomologist and ecologist, both of whom worked at the Tropical Agricultural Research Station at the University of Puerto Rico at Mayagüez. She was influenced by her maternal grandmother, who encouraged her education. As a child, she was interested in science, building a wet lab at age 13.

Miskimen Rivera studied biology as an undergraduate at the University of Puerto Rico, earning a B.S. in 1986. She then attended the University of Puerto Rico, Medical Sciences Campus, where she earned a M.D. in 1990. A fourth-year elective in child psychiatry in Newark, New Jersey, solidified her decision to enter the field. Following medical school, she moved to the United States and completed her psychiatry residency in 1994 at the University of Medicine and Dentistry of New Jersey (UMDNJ). The same year, Miskimen Rivera received a Lester Granet Clinical and Teaching Excellence Award from New Jersey Medical School. In 1998, she completed a Health Services Research Institute Fellowship with the Association of American Medical Colleges and became a Diplomate in Addiction Psychiatry with the American Board of Psychiatry and Neurology.

== Career ==
Miskimen Rivera is a clinical professor of psychiatry at the Robert Wood Johnson Medical School and is the chair and medical director of the department of psychiatry at Hunterdon Medical Center. Her work focuses on improving access to psychiatric care for bilingual and bicultural communities.

In 2004, New Jersey Governor James McGreevey appointed her to the Youth Suicide Prevention Advisory Council. She received the Teaching Excellence Award in Psychiatry from Robert Wood Johnson Medical School in 2006. The following year, governor Jon Corzine appointed her to the Mental Health Subcommittee of the Campus Security Task Force. She received a U.S. Army Freedom Team Salute commendation in 2009.

In 2010, Miskimen Rivera was appointed by governor Chris Christie to the state's Health Information Technology Commission, where she served until 2012. That same year, she was appointed to a two-year term as a voting member of the U.S. Department of Health & Human Services' Medicare Evidence Development and Coverage Advisory Committee. Also in 2010, she was honored by the National Resource Center for Hispanic Mental Health as an "Outstanding Leader" and received a certificate of special recognition from U.S. senator Bob Menendez for her work in Hispanic mental health advocacy.

Miskimen Rivera is a past secretary general of the American Society of Hispanic Psychiatry and served as an advisor for the "Changing Minds, Advancing Mental Health for Hispanics" project. She has also served as a delegate to the American Medical Association Section Council on Psychiatry. She is a member of the steering committee for the American Academy of Pediatrics' Wellness through Equity and Leadership (WEL) program. In September 2025, during a visit to Puerto Rico, she advocated for a multidisciplinary approach to treating post-traumatic stress related to Hurricane Maria.

=== American Psychiatric Association (APA) involvement ===
Miskimen Rivera is a Distinguished Life Fellow of the American Psychiatric Association (APA). She has held leadership roles within the organization, including president of the New Jersey Psychiatric Association from 2009 to 2010. She served as vice-chair of the Joint Reference Committee from 2016 to 2017 before being elected Speaker of the APA Assembly for the 2017 to 2018 term, becoming the first Hispanic person to hold the office. In 2018, she received the Women's Advocate Award from the APA Women's Caucus. In 2019, she chaired the APA Board of Trustees Ad Hoc Workgroup on Insurance.

In March 2024, Miskimen Rivera was chosen as president-elect of the APA. She officially assumed the presidency in May 2025 for a one-year term. As president, she stated her goals are to address the national shortage of psychiatrists by championing psychiatrist-led multidisciplinary teams, leveraging integrated care models to expand access, retaining telepsychiatry services, and promoting diversity-enhancing interdisciplinary programs.

== Personal life ==
Miskimen Rivera is married to an industrial engineer and has a son and a daughter. As of 2024, she resides in Millstone Township, New Jersey. She practices yoga and meditation.
