= Bairdsville, New Jersey =

Populated place in Monmouth County, New Jersey, US

- Unincorporated community
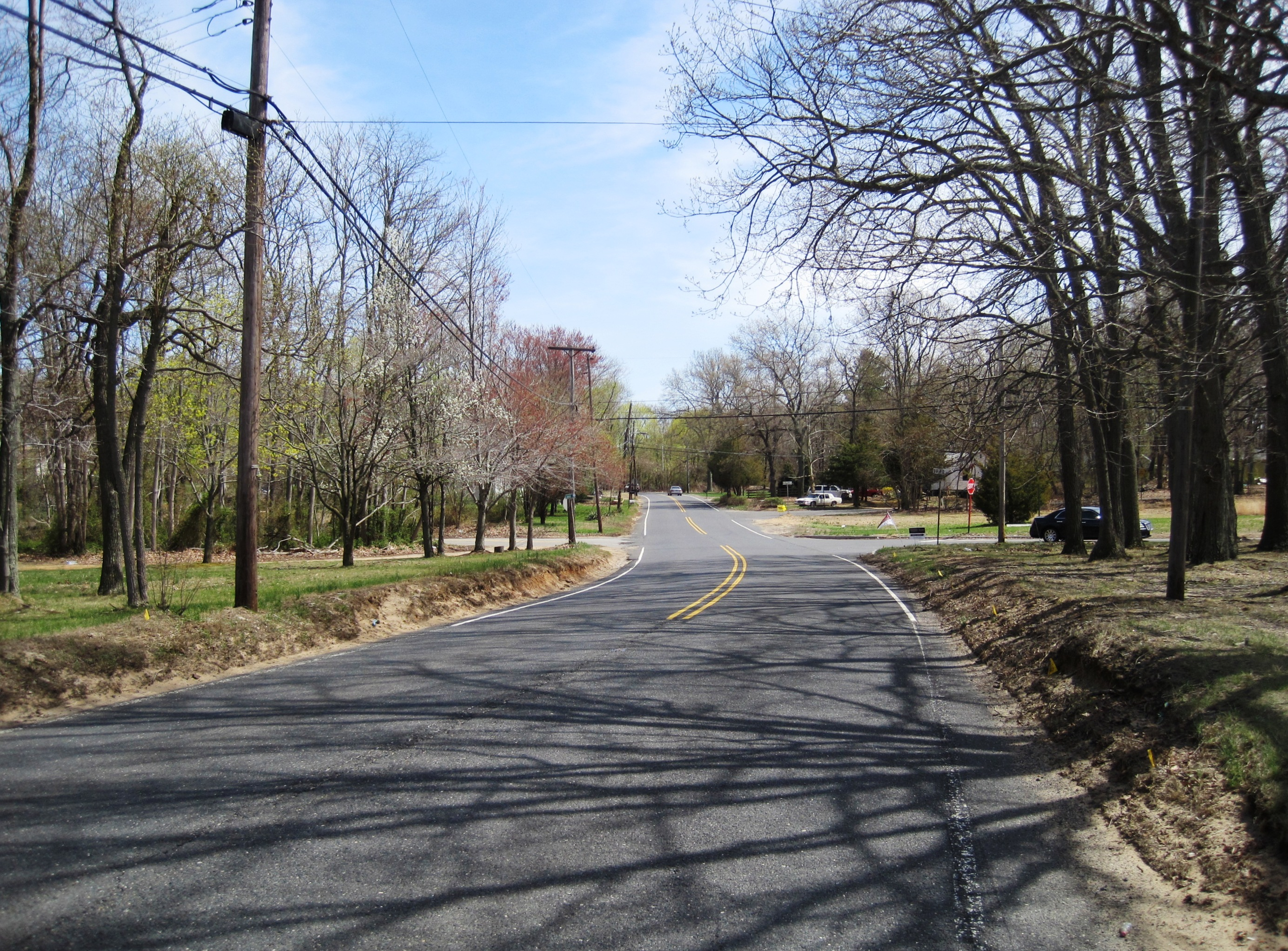
- County Route 527A southbound, approaching Baird Road

- Location of Bairdsville in Monmouth County. Inset: Location of county within the state of New Jersey Bairdsville (New Jersey) Bairdsville (the United States)
- Coordinates: 40°14′31″N 74°23′02″W
- Country: United States
- State: New Jersey
- County: Monmouth
- Township: Manalapan and Millstone
- Elevation: 177 ft (54 m)
- GNIS feature ID: 874461

Bairdsville is an unincorporated community on the border of Manalapan and Millstone townships in Monmouth County, in the U.S. state of New Jersey. The community is centered on the intersection of Woodville Road (County Route 527A) and Baird Road. Near the site of Bairdsville in Millstone is the Thomas Baird Homestead, a home owned by one of the first families to settle in Millstone.
