= Holmeson, New Jersey =

Populated place in Monmouth County, New Jersey, US

- Unincorporated community
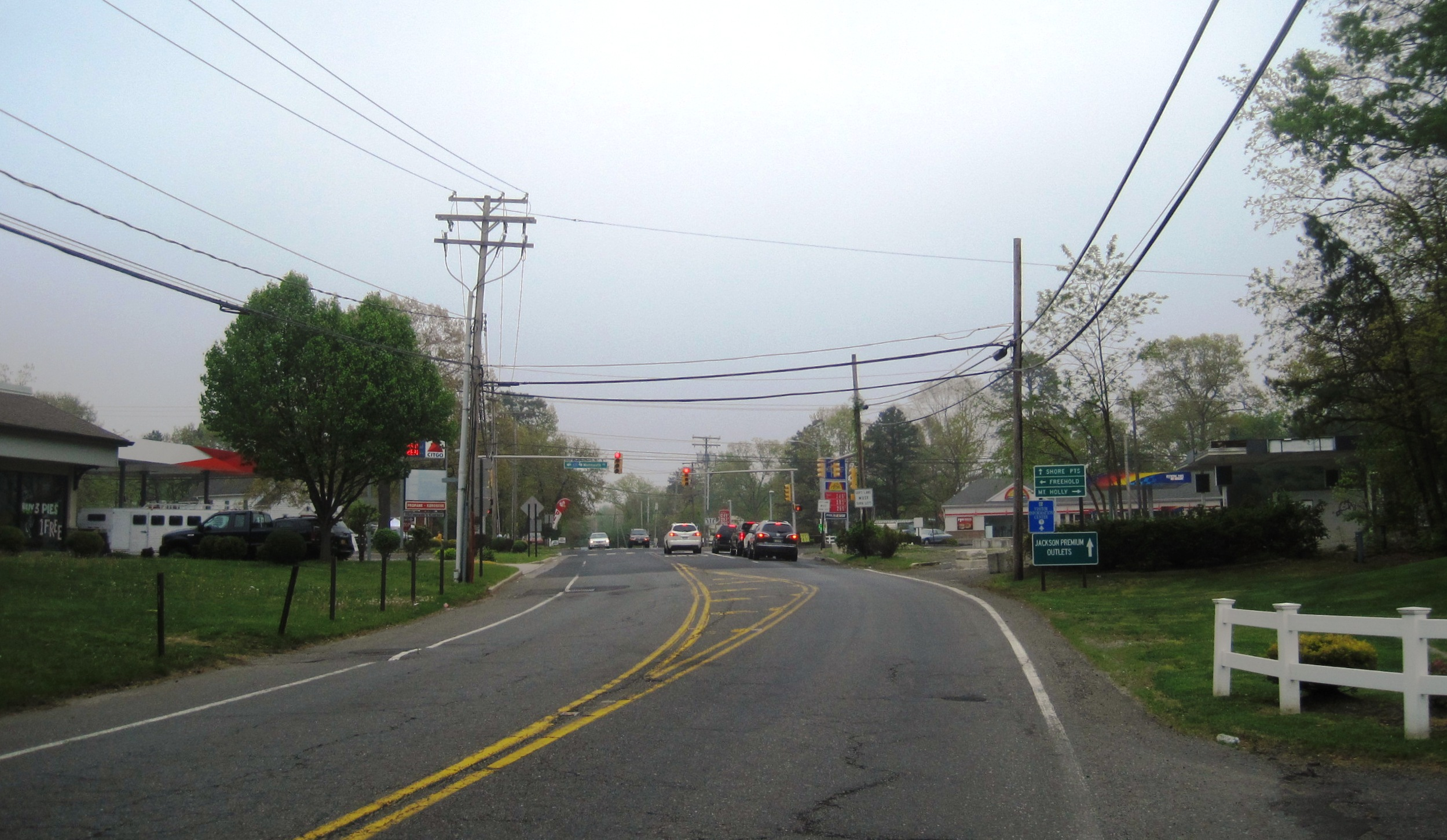
- Approaching the center of Holmeson along CR 526/CR 571 and CR 537

- Location in Monmouth County. Inset: Location of county within the state of New Jersey Holmeson (New Jersey) Holmeson (the United States)
- Coordinates: 40°09′56″N 74°25′01″W
- Country: United States
- State: New Jersey
- County: Monmouth
- Township: Millstone
- Elevation: 161 ft (49 m)
- Time zone: UTC−05:00 (Eastern (EST))
  - Summer (DST): UTC−04:00 (EDT)
- GNIS feature ID: 877187

Holmeson is an unincorporated community located within Millstone Township in Monmouth County, in the U.S. state of New Jersey. As it is located along County Route 537 through which the Monmouth–Ocean county line runs down the center, portions of the community are also located in Jackson Township. Owing to its location near Interstate 195 and Six Flags Great Adventure, the community is mostly made up of gas stations, restaurants, and small businesses though the Jackson Premium Outlets occupies land just south of the community.

The area is served as United States Postal Service ZIP Code 08510; according to the 2020–2024 American Community Survey 5-year estimates, ZIP Code Tabulation Area (ZCTA) 08510 had a population of 5,386.
