= Stone Tavern, New Jersey =

Populated place in Monmouth County, New Jersey, US

- Unincorporated community
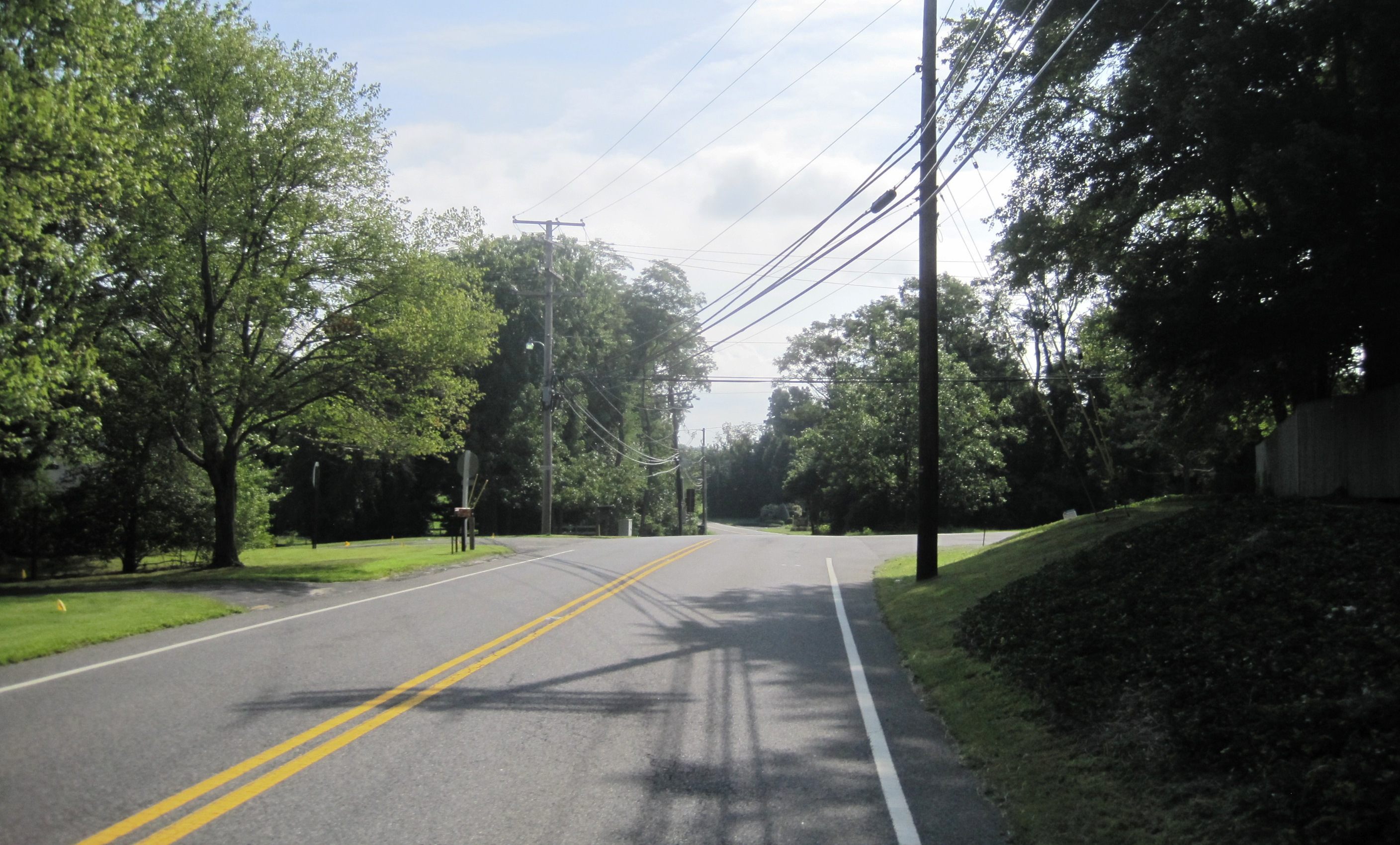
- Stage Coach Road (CR 524)

- Location of Stone Tavern in Monmouth County. Inset: Location of county within the state of New Jersey Stone Tavern (New Jersey) Stone Tavern (the United States)
- Coordinates: 40°11′20″N 74°28′17″W
- Country: United States
- State: New Jersey
- County: Monmouth
- Township: Millstone and Upper Freehold
- Elevation: 210 ft (64 m)
- Time zone: UTC−05:00 (Eastern (EST))
  - Summer (DST): UTC−04:00 (EDT)
- GNIS feature ID: 880930

Stone Tavern is an unincorporated community located on the border of Millstone and Upper Freehold townships in Monmouth County, in the U.S. state of New Jersey.

The community took its name from a stone tavern once called Britton's Tavern. Today the area, located along County Route 524 at the Millstone–Upper Freehold township line, consists mainly of single-family homes in forested rolling terrain.
