= Charleston Springs, New Jersey =

Populated place in Monmouth County, New Jersey, US

- Unincorporated community
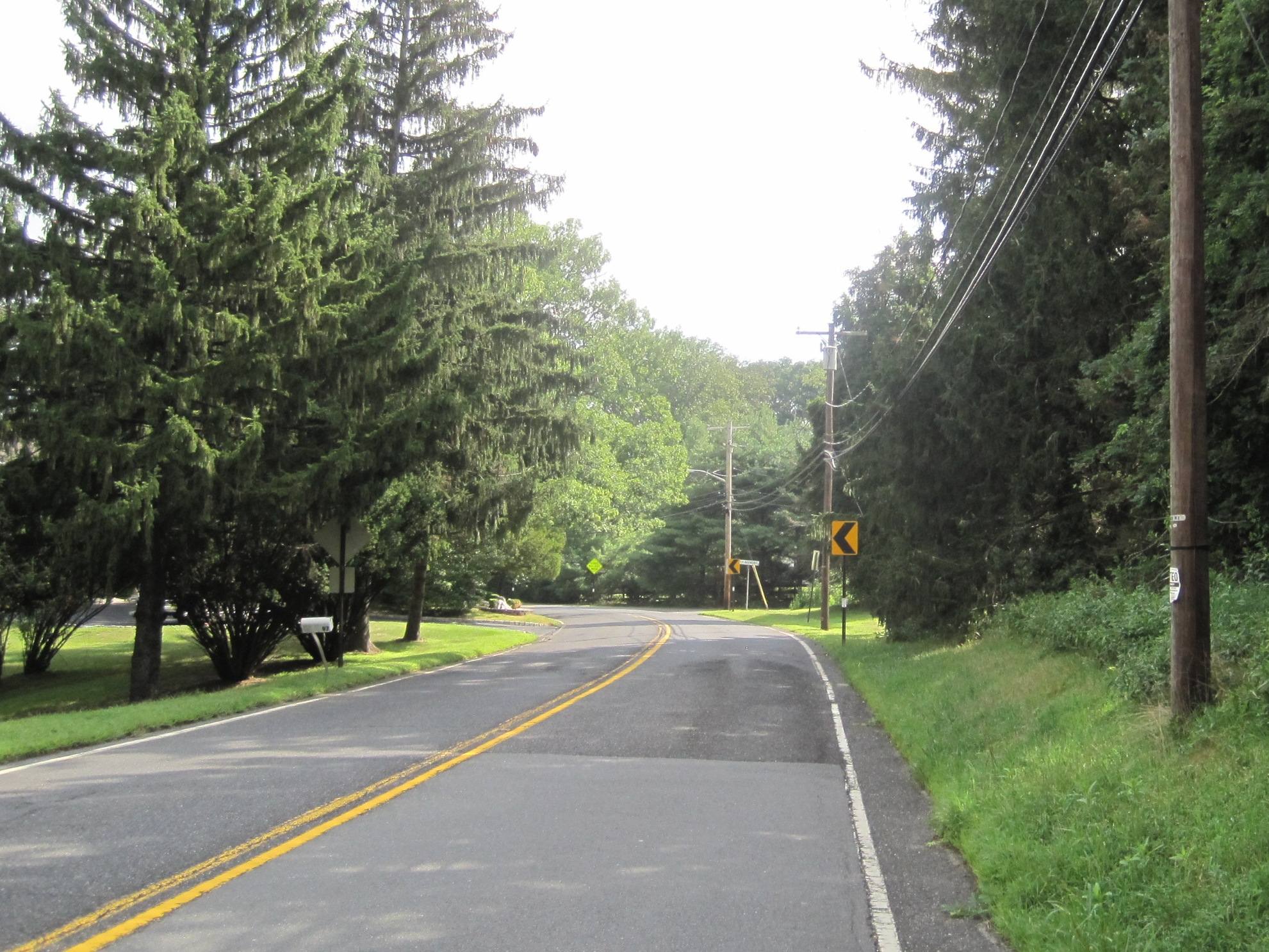
- Charleston Springs as seen from Stage Coach Road (CR 524) approaching Ely Harmony Road

- Location in Monmouth County. Inset: Location of county within the state of New Jersey. Charleston Springs (New Jersey) Charleston Springs (the United States)
- Coordinates: 40°12′02″N 74°22′24″W
- Country: United States
- State: New Jersey
- County: Monmouth
- Township: Millstone
- Elevation: 203 ft (62 m)
- GNIS feature ID: 875372

Charleston Springs is an unincorporated community located within Millstone Township in Monmouth County, in the U.S. state of New Jersey. Stage Coach Road, also designated County Route 524, is the main road that runs through the settlement, with Ely Harmony Road as the intersecting road defining the locality. The Manalapan Brook runs to the west of the center of Charleston Springs and CR 537 runs to the south of the area. The Monmouth County-owned Charleston Springs Golf Course is located one mile (1.6 km) northeast of the center of Charleston Springs on CR 527.
