= Millstone Township, New Jersey =

Township in Monmouth County, New Jersey, US

- Township
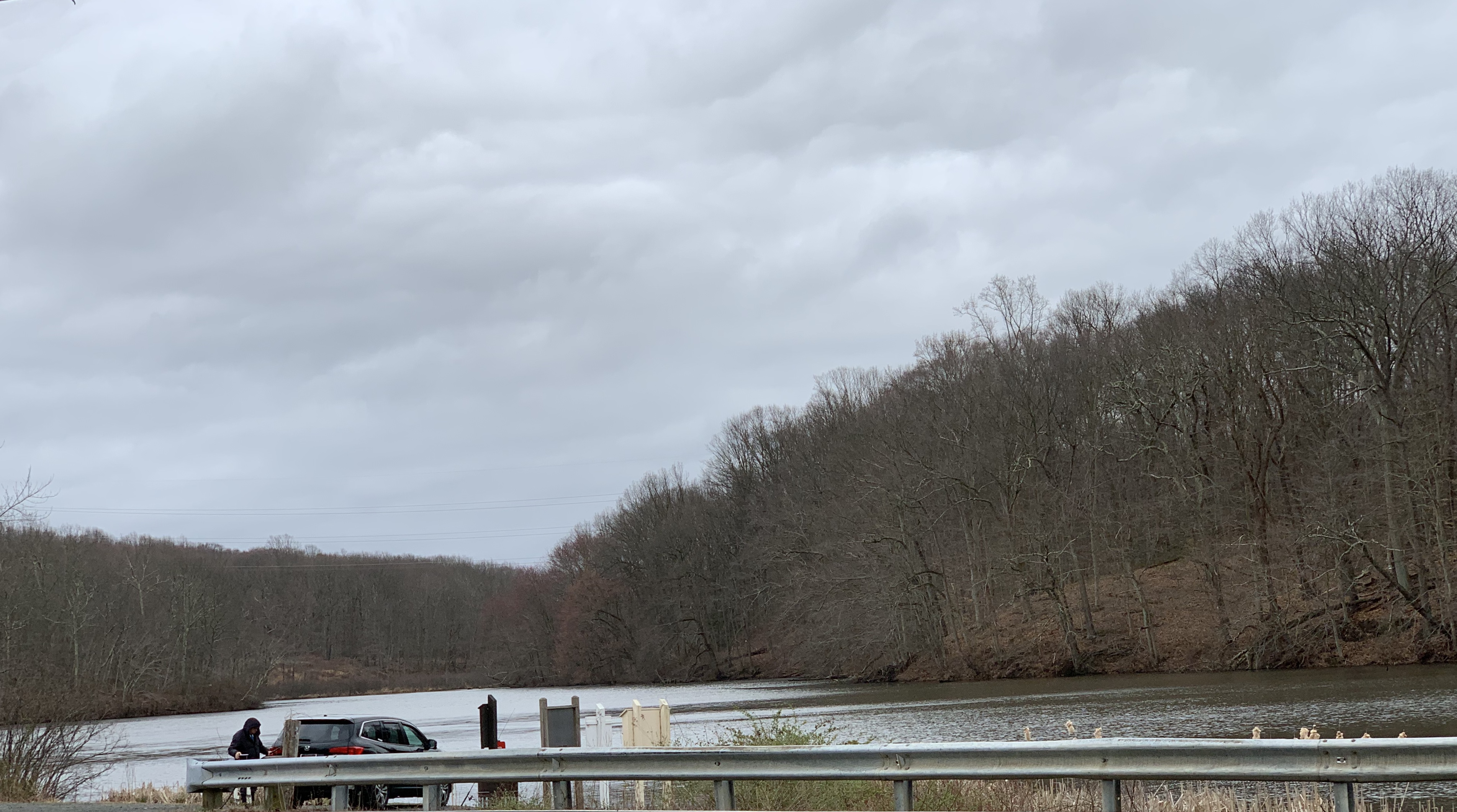
- Perrineville Lake in Millstone, at the headwaters for Rocky Brook, in early spring

- Seal

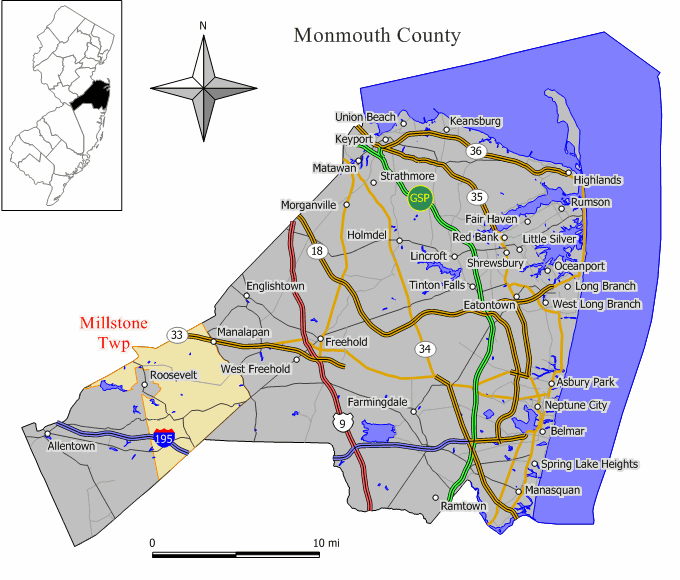
- Location of Millstone Township in Monmouth County highlighted in yellow (right). Inset map: Location of Monmouth County in New Jersey highlighted in black (left).

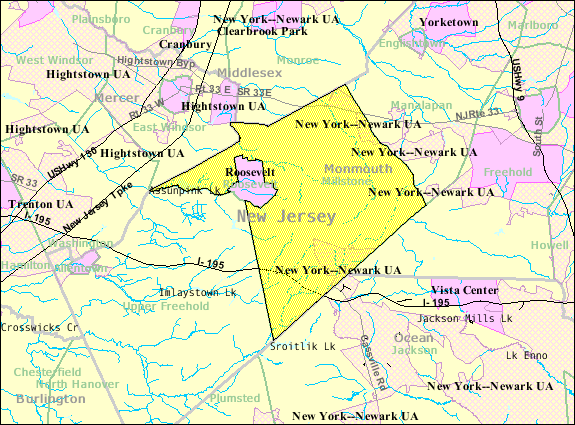
- Census Bureau map of Millstone Township, New Jersey

- Location in Monmouth County Location in New Jersey Location in the United States
- Coordinates: 40.213339°N 74.431681°W
- Country: United States
- State: New Jersey
- County: Monmouth
- Incorporated: February 28, 1844
- Named for: The Millstone River

Government
  - Type: Township
  - Body: Township Committee
  - Mayor: Albert Ferro (R, term ends December 31, 2025)
  - Administrator: Kevin Abernethy
  - Municipal clerk: Kathleen Hart

Area
  - Total: 37.18 sq mi (96.30 km^{2})
  - Land: 36.61 sq mi (94.81 km^{2})
  - Water: 0.58 sq mi (1.49 km^{2}) 1.55%
  - Rank: 64th of 565 in state 5th of 53 in county
- Elevation: 223 ft (68 m)

Population (2020)
  - Total: 10,376
  - Estimate (2023): 10,320
  - Rank: 237th of 565 in state 18th of 53 in county
  - Density: 283.4/sq mi (109.4/km^{2})
  - Rank: 481st of 565 in state 52nd of 53 in county
- Time zone: UTC−05:00 (Eastern (EST))
  - Summer (DST): UTC−04:00 (Eastern (EDT))
- ZIP Codes: 08510 - Clarksburg; 08535 - Perrineville
- Area code: 732 exchanges: 833, 928
- FIPS code: 3402546560
- GNIS feature ID: 0882115
- Website: www.millstonenj.gov

Millstone Township is a township in western Monmouth County, in the U.S. state of New Jersey. The township is located within the Raritan Valley region and is a part of the New York metropolitan area. As of the 2020 United States census, the township's population was 10,376, a decrease of 190 (−1.8%) from the 2010 census count of 10,566, which in turn reflected an increase of 1,596 (+17.8%) from the 8,970 counted in the 2000 census.

The township was named after the Millstone River, a major tributary of the Raritan River, and whose name originated from an incident in which a millstone was dropped into the river. The headwaters for the Millstone River originate in the township.

The township has been ranked as one of the state's highest-income communities. Based on data from the American Community Survey for 2013–2017, Millstone residents had a median household income of $156,891, more than double the statewide median of $76,475 and ranked ninth in the state among municipalities with more than 10,000 residents.

== History ==
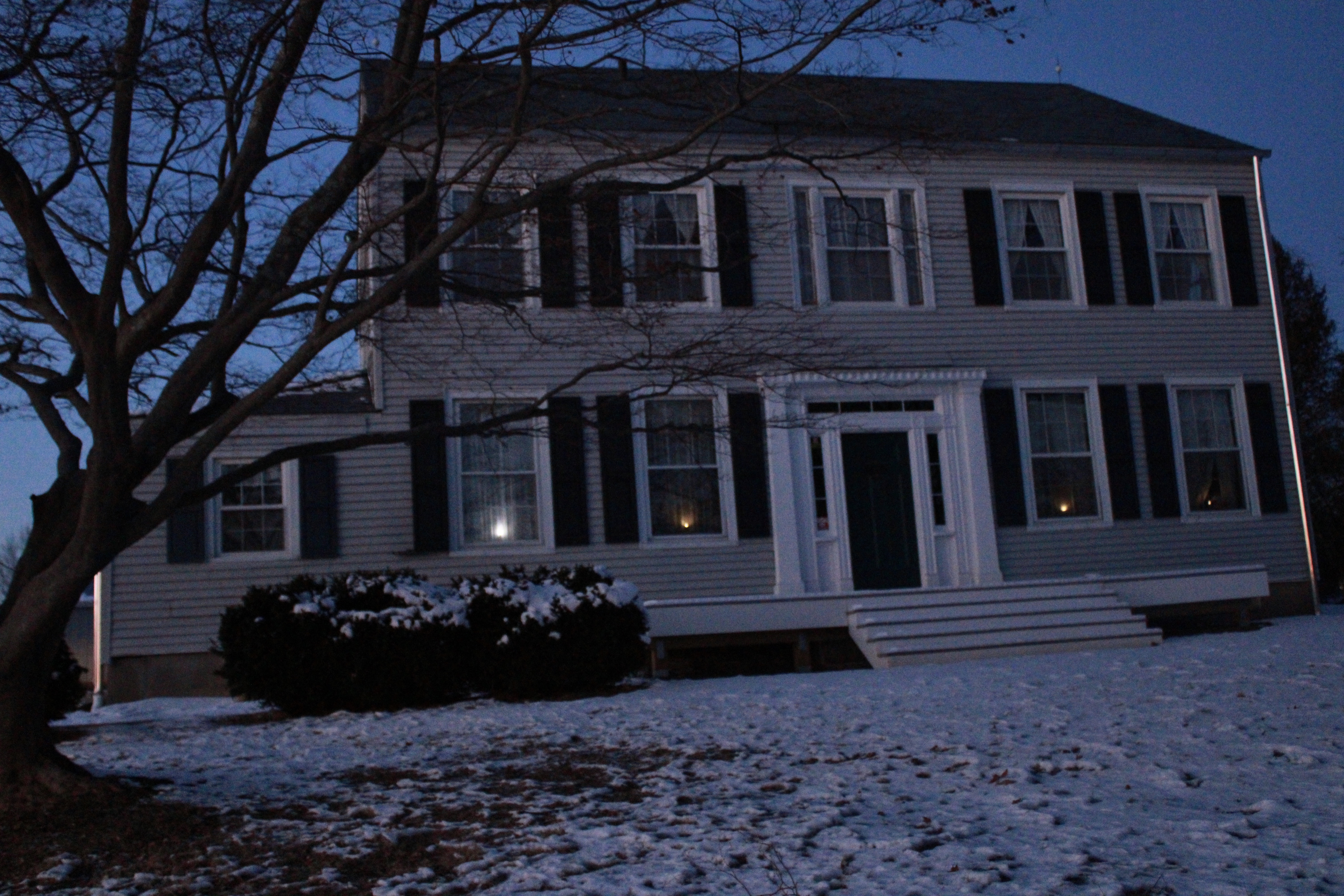
The Thomas Baird Homestead, owned by one of the first families to settle in Millstone, seen at twilight

Millstone was originally inhabited by Lenape Native Americans prior to colonization. The township was said to have been founded by an English tanner, Clark prior to the Revolutionary War. Following colonization, Millstone ended up consisting of several villages, of which Clarksburg retains its historic character the most prominently. John Perrine purchased a large tract of land north of Clarksburg, which became known as Perrineville.

During the American Revolutionary War, Millstone held a secret post for the Continental Army, known as Signal Beacon #21. The Rising Sun Tavern, the township's first business, was used as an outpost by George Washington and later a headquarters for British General Sir Henry Clinton. The tavern accommodated other famous figures such as Benjamin Franklin and Joseph Bonaparte. The tavern was located on a stagecoach route between Philadelphia and Freehold.

United States president Theodore Roosevelt created a presidential retreat in Millstone.

Millstone was formed as a township by an act of the New Jersey Legislature on February 28, 1844, from portions of Freehold Township and Upper Freehold Township, as well as part of Monroe Township in Middlesex County. The portions taken from Monroe Township were relinquished in 1845. On May 29, 1937, portions of the township were taken to form the borough of Jersey Homesteads (now Roosevelt).

The township has been one of the state's highest-income communities. Based on data from the American Community Survey for 2013–2017, Millstone Township residents had a median household income of $156,891, ranked 9th in the state among municipalities with more than 10,000 residents, more than double the statewide median of $76,475.

== Geography ==
According to the United States Census Bureau, the township had a total area of 37.18 square miles (96.30 km^{2}), including 36.61 square miles (94.81 km^{2}) of land and 0.58 square miles (1.49 km^{2}) of water (1.55%).

There are two unincorporated communities within the township served by the United States Postal Service as post offices. Clarksburg is served by post office ZIP Code 08510 and Perrineville is served as ZIP code 08535. Other unincorporated communities and place names located entirely or partially within the township include Baird, Bairdsville, Bergen Mills, Burksville, Carrs Corner, Carrs Tavern, Charleston Springs, Disbrow Hill, Ely, Elys Corner, Fair Play, Hillhurt, Holmeson, Pine Hill, Smithburg, Stone Tavern and Sweetman.

The township borders Freehold Township, Manalapan Township, Roosevelt and Upper Freehold Township in Monmouth County; East Windsor and Robbinsville Township in Mercer County; Monroe Township in Middlesex County; and Jackson Township in Ocean County.

=== Major bodies of water ===
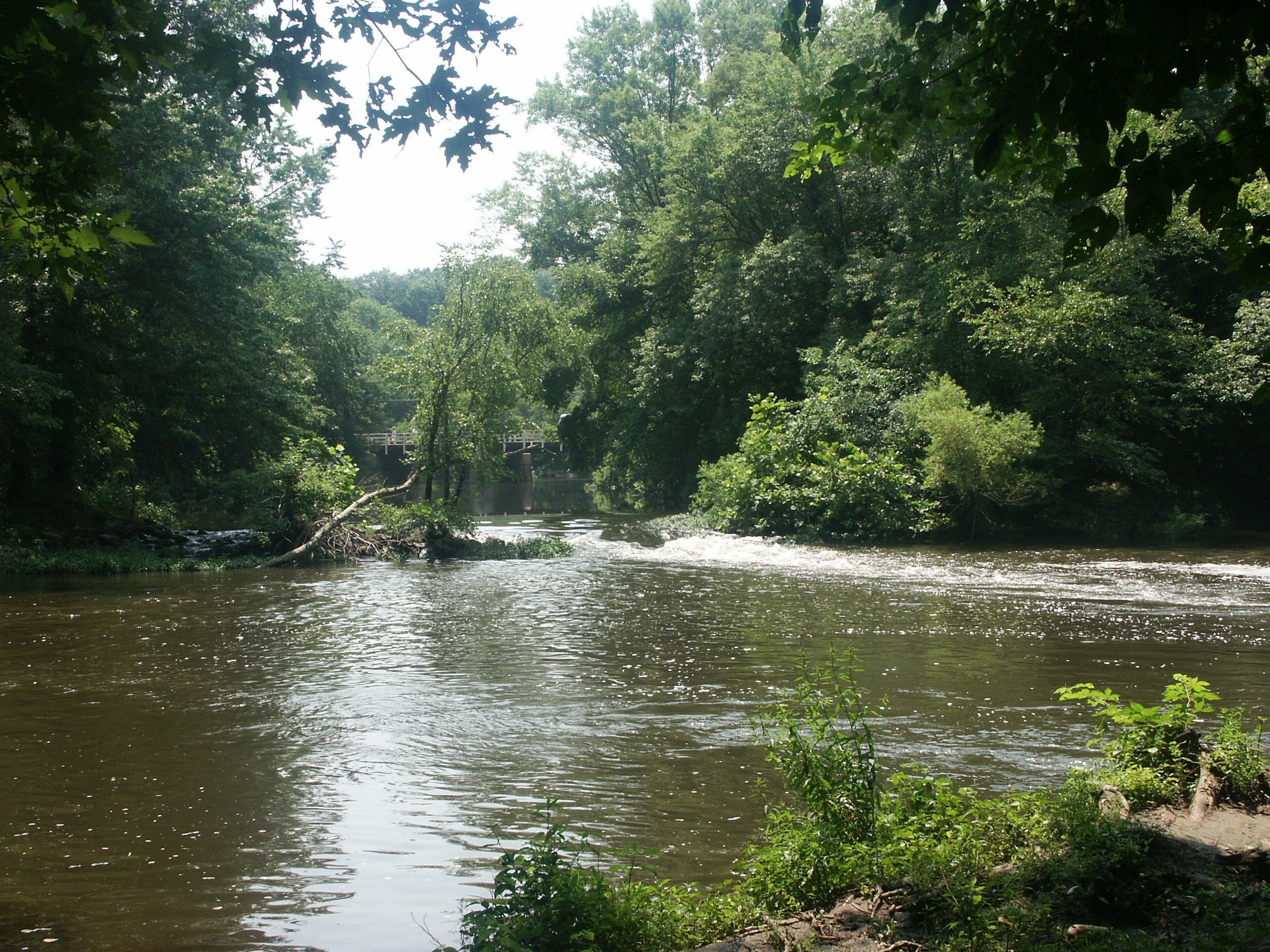
The namesake Millstone River flows through the township.

Due to the township's unique location in the center of New Jersey, it is the home of numerous headwaters for various important rivers, brooks, and streams that flow throughout the state. The township is located on a ridge within the geographic heartland of New Jersey. The township falls within the hillier terrain and fertile soil found in the Inner coastal plain, while a small sliver of the eastern border of the township (which borders Jackson Township) is located within the flat terrain and sandier soil found in the Outer coastal plain.

Much of the township is centrally located within the much larger Raritan Valley region's watershed (as many of its brooks and streams flow into the river). The township is the headwaters for the Millstone River, one of the most important tributaries of the aforementioned river. Part of the township also belongs to the Delaware Valley region's watershed, with the Assunpink Creek and the Doctors Creek flowing through the southern and western sections of the township bordering Upper Freehold Township. Part of the Assunpink Wildlife Preservation Area is located in the township, as well as in portions of Upper Freehold Township, Roosevelt and Robbinsville Township. The reservation offers wetlands and lakes for viewing migratory birds, in addition to mountain biking trails, bridle paths and hiking trails, operated under the supervision of the New Jersey Department of Environmental Protection Division of Fish and Wildlife. Turkey Swamp Park is another nature reservation which features wetlands, hiking trails, and even campgrounds, located in neighboring Freehold Township. The township is also one of only two municipalities in Monmouth County that are part of the Toms River watershed, most of which is located in Ocean County, as it rises from the Millstone and Jackson area, flowing southward through the New Jersey Pine Barrens to the Barnegat Bay.

Other notable bodies of water within the township include:

==== Lakes ====
- Assunpink Lake (located at Assunpink Wildlife Preservation Area)
- Bulk's Lake (located at Charleston Springs Golf Course)
- Perrineville Lake
- Rising Sun Lake

==== Rivers ====
- Barnegat Bay Watershed
  - Metedeconk River
    - North Branch Metedeconk River
  - Toms River
- Delaware River Watershed
  - Assunpink Creek
  - Crosswicks Creek
    - Doctors Creek
- Raritan Basin Watershed
  - Millstone River
    - Rocky Brook
    - Cranbury Brook
  - South River
    - Manalapan Brook

=== Ecology ===
According to the A. W. Kuchler U.S. potential natural vegetation types, Millstone Township would have an Appalachian Oak (104) vegetation type with an Eastern Hardwood Forest (25) vegetation form.

== Demographics ==
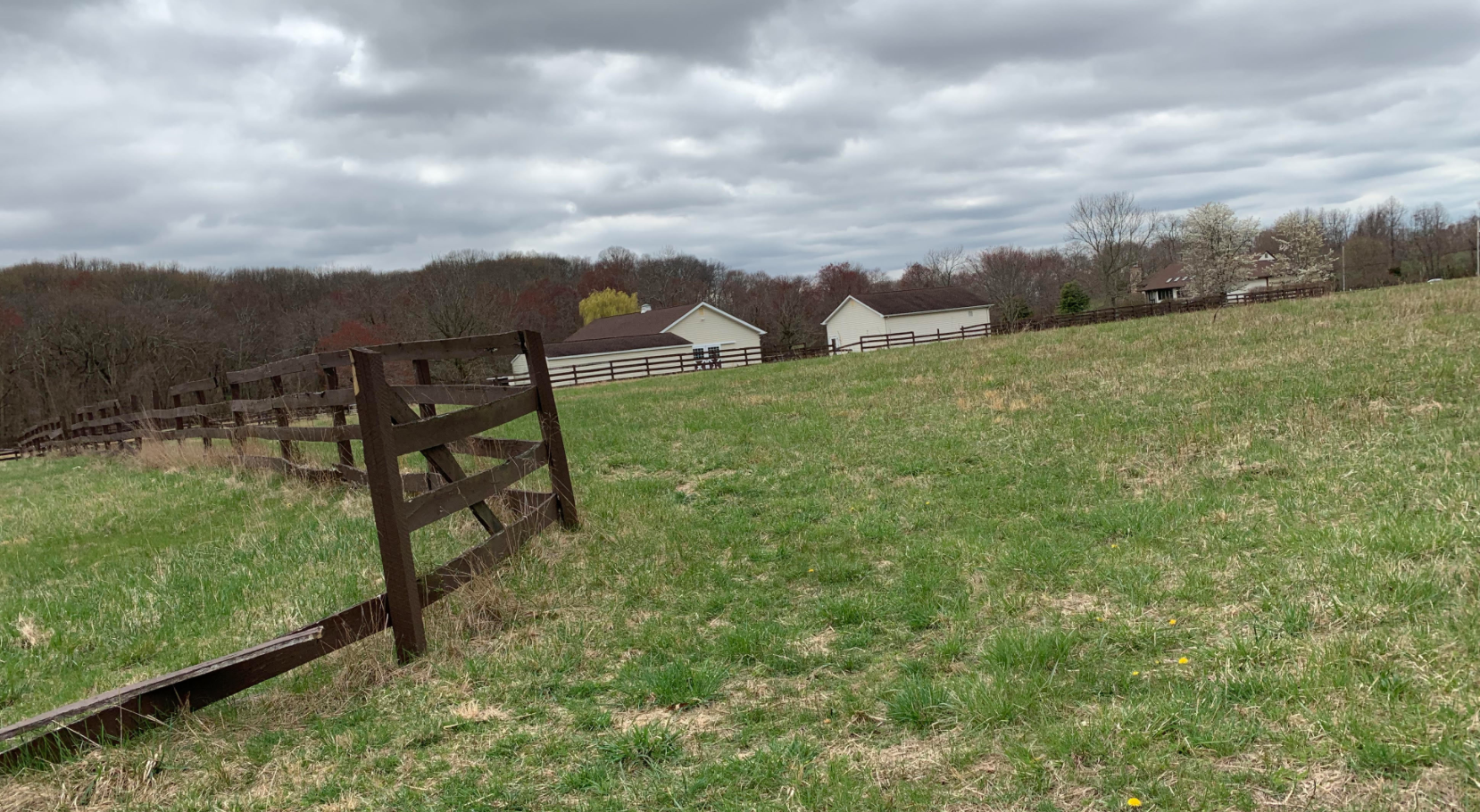
Open fields in Millstone Township

Historical population
Census	Pop.	Note	%±
1850	1,676		—
1860	2,356		40.6%
1870	2,087		−11.4%
1880	2,080		−0.3%
1890	1,782		−14.3%
1900	1,509		−15.3%
1910	1,461		−3.2%
1920	1,405		−3.8%
1930	1,428		1.6%
1940	1,466	*	2.7%
1950	2,100		43.2%
1960	2,550		21.4%
1970	2,535		−0.6%
1980	3,926		54.9%
1990	5,069		29.1%
2000	8,970		77.0%
2010	10,566		17.8%
2020	10,376		−1.8%
2023 (est.)	10,320		−0.5%
Population sources: 1850–1920 1850–1870; 1850 1870 1880–1890; 1890–1910 1910–1930 1940–2000; 2000 2010 2020 *=lost territory in previous decade.

=== 2010 census ===
The 2010 United States census counted 10,566 people, 3,301 households, and 2,888 families in the township. The population density was 288.8 per square mile (111.5/km^{2}). There were 3,434 housing units at an average density of 93.9 per square mile (36.3/km^{2}). The racial makeup was 89.44% (9,450) White, 3.59% (379) Black or African American, 0.17% (18) Native American, 4.51% (476) Asian, 0.00% (0) Pacific Islander, 0.80% (85) from other races, and 1.50% (158) from two or more races. Hispanic or Latino of any race were 5.48% (579) of the population.

Of the 3,301 households, 45.8% had children under the age of 18; 78.5% were married couples living together; 5.6% had a female householder with no husband present and 12.5% were non-families. Of all households, 9.3% were made up of individuals and 3.0% had someone living alone who was 65 years of age or older. The average household size was 3.20 and the average family size was 3.42.

28.4% of the population were under the age of 18, 7.2% from 18 to 24, 18.8% from 25 to 44, 37.4% from 45 to 64, and 8.1% who were 65 years of age or older. The median age was 42.6 years. For every 100 females, the population had 99.4 males. For every 100 females ages 18 and older there were 99.3 males.

The Census Bureau's 2006–2010 American Community Survey showed that (in 2010 inflation-adjusted dollars) median household income was $134,909 (with a margin of error of +/− $15,849) and the median family income was $139,535 (+/− $20,761). Males had a median income of $92,222 (+/− $13,047) versus $66,090 (+/− $14,854) for females. The per capita income for the borough was $50,390 (+/− $5,755). About 0.4% of families and 0.3% of the population were below the poverty line, including 0.7% of those under age 18 and none of those age 65 or over.

=== 2000 census ===
As of the 2000 United States census there were 8,970 people, 2,708 households, and 2,426 families residing in the township. The population density was 244.0 inhabitants per square mile (94.2/km^{2}). There were 2,797 housing units at an average density of 76.1 per square mile (29.4/km^{2}). The racial makeup of the township was 97.83% White, 1.05% African American, 0.10% Native American, 1.43% Asian, 0.03% Pacific Islander, 0.61% from other races, and 0.94% from two or more races. Hispanic or Latino of any race were 3.51% of the population.

There were 2,708 households, out of which 52.8% had children under the age of 18 living with them, 81.4% were married couples living together, 5.5% had a female householder with no husband present, and 10.4% were non-families. 7.5% of all households were made up of individuals, and 2.1% had someone living alone who was 65 years of age or older. The average household size was 3.28 and the average family size was 3.46.

In the township the population was spread out, with 32.8% under the age of 18, 4.5% from 18 to 24, 31.7% from 25 to 44, 25.0% from 45 to 64, and 6.0% who were 65 years of age or older. The median age was 37 years. For every 100 females, there were 99.4 males. For every 100 females age 18 and over, there were 96.0 males.

The median income for a household in the township was $104,561, and the median income for a family was $106,116. Males had a median income of $74,333 versus $50,036 for females. The per capita income for the township was $58,285. About 3.8% of families and 4.9% of the population were below the poverty line, including 6.0% of those under age 18 and 4.8% of those age 65 or over.

== Government ==
=== Local government ===
Millstone is governed under the Township form of New Jersey municipal government, one of 141 municipalities (of the 564) statewide that use this form, the second-most commonly used form of government in the state. The Township Committee is comprised of five members, who are elected directly by the voters at-large in partisan elections to serve three-year terms of office on a staggered basis, with either one or two seats coming up for election each year as part of the November general election in a three-year cycle. At an annual reorganization meeting, the council selects one of its members to serves as mayor and another as deputy mayor.

The Township Committee is Millstone's legislative body. It sets policies, approves budgets, determines municipal tax rates, and passes resolutions and ordinances to govern the town. The Committee also appoints citizen volunteers to advisory boards, the Zoning Board of Adjustment, committees, and commissions. The Committee may investigate the conduct of any department, officer or agency of the municipal government. They have full power of subpoena permitted by Statute.

As of January 2026, the Millstone Township Committee consists of Mayor Albert "Al" Ferro (R, term on committee ends December 31, 2028 and as mayor ends December 31, 2026), Deputy Mayor Chris Morris (R, term on committee 2026; term as deputy mayor ends 2026), Eric Davis (R, 2027), Tara Zabrosky (R, 2027) and Jeff Ziner (R, 2026).

In September 2018, Al Ferro was selected from three candidates nominated by the Republican municipal committee to fill the seat expiring in December 2019 that had been vacated by Robert Kinsey in August due to illness.

=== Federal, state, and county representation ===
Millstone Township is located in the 3rd Congressional District and is part of New Jersey's 12th state legislative district.

For the 119th United States Congress, New Jersey's 3rd congressional district is currently represented Herb Conaway (D, Delran Township). New Jersey is represented in the United States Senate by Democrats Cory Booker (Newark, term ends 2027) and Andy Kim (Moorestown, term ends 2031).

For the 2026–2027 session, the 12th legislative district of the New Jersey Legislature is represented in the State Senate by Owen Henry (R, Old Bridge Township) and in the General Assembly by Robert D. Clifton (R, Matawan) and Alex Sauickie (R, Jackson Township).

Monmouth County is governed by a Board of County Commissioners composed of five members who are elected at-large to serve three-year terms of office on a staggered basis, with either one or two seats up for election each year as part of the November general election. At an annual reorganization meeting held in the beginning of January, the board selects one of its members to serve as director and another as deputy director.

As of 2025, Monmouth County's Commissioners are Director Thomas A. Arnone (R, Neptune City, 2025), Susan M. Kiley (R, Hazlet Township, 2027), Erik Anderson (R, Shrewsbury, 2026), Nick DiRocco (R, Wall Township, 2025), and Deputy Director Ross F. Licitra (R, Marlboro Township, 2026).

Constitutional officers elected on a countywide basis are Clerk Christine Giordano Hanlon (R, 2025; Ocean Township), Sheriff Shaun Golden (R, 2025; Howell Township) and Surrogate Rosemarie D. Peters (R, 2026; Middletown Township).

=== Politics ===
United States presidential election results for Millstone
Year	Republican		Democratic		Third party(ies)	
Year	No.	%	No.	%	No.	%
2024	4,370	66.60%	2,072	31.58%	120	1.83%
2020	4,287	63.19%	2,413	35.57%	84	1.24%
2016	3,732	64.63%	1,845	31.95%	197	3.41%
2012	3,340	65.52%	1,698	33.31%	60	1.18%
2008	3,373	63.59%	1,867	35.20%	64	1.21%
2004	3,289	65.81%	1,668	33.37%	41	0.82%
2000	2,296	56.82%	1,567	38.78%	178	4.40%
1996	1,590	54.25%	974	33.23%	367	12.52%
1992	1,361	48.47%	735	26.18%	712	25.36%

As of March 2011, there were a total of 6,954 registered voters in Millstone Township, of which 1,159 (16.7%) were registered as Democrats, 2,621 (37.7%) were registered as Republicans and 3,171 (45.6%) were registered as Unaffiliated. There were 3 voters registered as Libertarians or Greens.

Gubernatorial election results for Millstone Township
Year	Republican		Democratic		Third party(ies)	
Year	No.	%	No.	%	No.	%
2025	3,406	66.25%	1,702	33.11%	33	0.64%
2021	3,146	72.76%	1,146	26.50%	32	0.74%
2017	2,285	70.48%	916	28.25%	41	1.26%
2013	2,384	80.03%	544	18.26%	51	1.71%
2009	2,875	76.02%	729	19.28%	178	4.71%
2005	2,259	65.94%	1,017	29.68%	150	4.38%

In the 2012 presidential election, Republican Mitt Romney received 65.5% of the vote (3,340 cast), ahead of Democrat Barack Obama with 33.3% (1,698 votes), and other candidates with 1.2% (60 votes), among the 5,134 ballots cast by the township's 7,344 registered voters (36 ballots were spoiled), for a turnout of 69.9%. In the 2008 presidential election, Republican John McCain received 62.8% of the vote (3,373 cast), ahead of Democrat Barack Obama with 34.8% (1,867 votes) and other candidates with 1.2% (64 votes), among the 5,368 ballots cast by the township's 7,032 registered voters, for a turnout of 76.3%. In the 2004 presidential election, Republican George W. Bush received 65.7% of the vote (3,289 ballots cast), outpolling Democrat John Kerry with 33.3% (1,668 votes) and other candidates with 0.6% (41 votes), among the 5,005 ballots cast by the township's 6,603 registered voters, for a turnout percentage of 75.8.

In the 2013 gubernatorial election, Republican Chris Christie received 80.0% of the vote (2,384 cast), ahead of Democrat Barbara Buono with 18.3% (544 votes), and other candidates with 1.7% (51 votes), among the 3,007 ballots cast by the township's 7,363 registered voters (28 ballots were spoiled), for a turnout of 40.8%. In the 2009 gubernatorial election, Republican Chris Christie received 75.8% of the vote (2,875 ballots cast), ahead of Democrat Jon Corzine with 19.2% (729 votes), Independent Chris Daggett with 4.4% (167 votes) and other candidates with 0.3% (11 votes), among the 3,791 ballots cast by the township's 6,938 registered voters, yielding a 54.6% turnout.

United States Senate election results for Millstone Township1
Year	Republican		Democratic		Third party(ies)	
Year	No.	%	No.	%	No.	%
2024	4,136	65.87%	2,039	32.47%	104	1.66%
2018	3,126	68.36%	1,336	29.21%	111	2.43%
2012	3,179	66.16%	1,539	32.03%	87	1.81%
2006	2,059	65.57%	994	31.66%	87	2.77%

United States Senate election results for Millstone Township2
Year	Republican		Democratic		Third party(ies)	
Year	No.	%	No.	%	No.	%
2020	4,278	64.21%	2,277	34.17%	108	1.62%
2014	1,738	66.79%	819	31.48%	45	1.73%
2013	1,270	68.65%	574	31.03%	6	0.32%
2008	3,272	66.59%	1,499	30.50%	143	2.91%

== Education ==
The Millstone Township Schools serve public school students in pre-kindergarten through eighth grade. As of the 2018–19 school year, the district, comprised of three schools, had an enrollment of 1,109 students and 93.0 classroom teachers (on an FTE basis), for a student–teacher ratio of 11.9:1. Schools in the district (with 2018–19 enrollment data from the National Center for Education Statistics) are Millstone Township Primary School with 386 students in grades Pre-K–2, Millstone Township Elementary School with 321 students in grades 3–5 and Millstone Township Middle School with 400 students in grades 6–8.

Students in ninth through twelfth grades for public school attend Allentown High School in Allentown, as part of a sending/receiving relationship with the Upper Freehold Regional School District, which also includes students from Allentown and Upper Freehold Township. As of the 2018–19 school year, the high school had an enrollment of 1,206 students and 89.5 classroom teachers (on an FTE basis), for a student–teacher ratio of 13.5:1.

== Infrastructure ==
=== Emergency services ===
==== Police ====
The township does not have a local police department. Millstone Township is patrolled by the New Jersey State Police's Hamilton Station.

==== EMS ====
The Millstone Township Fire Department provides EMS with a staffed ambulance, 24/7. The Millstone Township First Aid Squad was closed in 2020. The First Aid squad was replaced by an EMS division within the Millstone Township Fire Department. This is now the municipality's only official provider of 24/7 Basic Life Support (BLS) Ambulance services. The division is made up of a mix of full-time career personnel and dedicated volunteer Emergency Medical Technicians (EMTs) in order to guarantee around the clock shift coverage. The Millstone Township Fire Department provides EMS to all of Millstone Township and Roosevelt Borough. The EMS is located in the center of Millstone on Stagecoach Road.

==== Fire ====
The local fire department consists of 19 career firefighters that provide fire protection, rescue, and are the BLS ambulance provider. Between the hours of 6 am and 6 pm, 6 personnel are on duty. 5 personnel are on duty from 6pm to 6 am, along with volunteer firefighters. In 2025, the department promoted its first full-time fire chief from within its ranks.

=== Transportation ===
==== Roads and highways ====
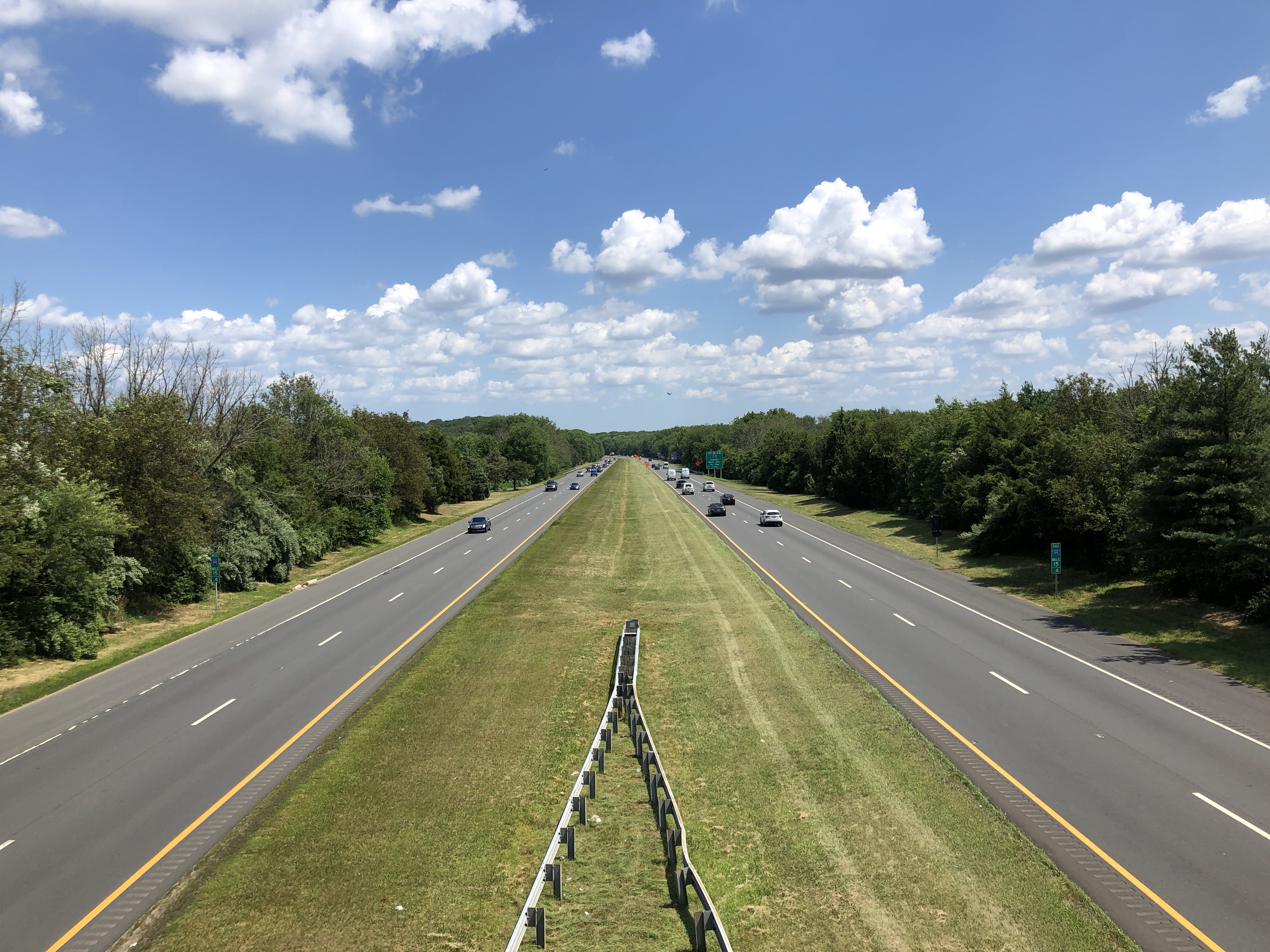
Interstate 195 in Millstone Township

As of May 2010, the township had a total of 150.87 miles (242.80 km) of roadways, of which 122.47 miles (197.10 km) were maintained by the municipality, 23.68 miles (38.11 km) by Monmouth County and 4.72 miles (7.60 km) by the New Jersey Department of Transportation.

Interstate 195 is the main highway serving Millstone Township. It crosses the southern part of the township, connecting to Upper Freehold and Jackson townships. Half of an interchange is located in Millstone (Exit 16 for CR 537) with the other half in Jackson.

CR 524, CR 526, CR 527, CR 537, and CR 571 are the main county highways which pass through Millstone Township. CR 539 also passes through the township, but there are no intersections prior to it entering Robbinsville/Upper Freehold on the south and East Windsor on the north. A small portion of Route 33 passes through the northern tip of the township prior to entering Manalapan Township and Monroe Township.

The New Jersey Turnpike (also known as Interstate 95) is accessible in neighboring Robbinsville Township (Exit 7A), East Windsor (Exit 8) and Monroe Township (Exit 8A).

=== Healthcare ===
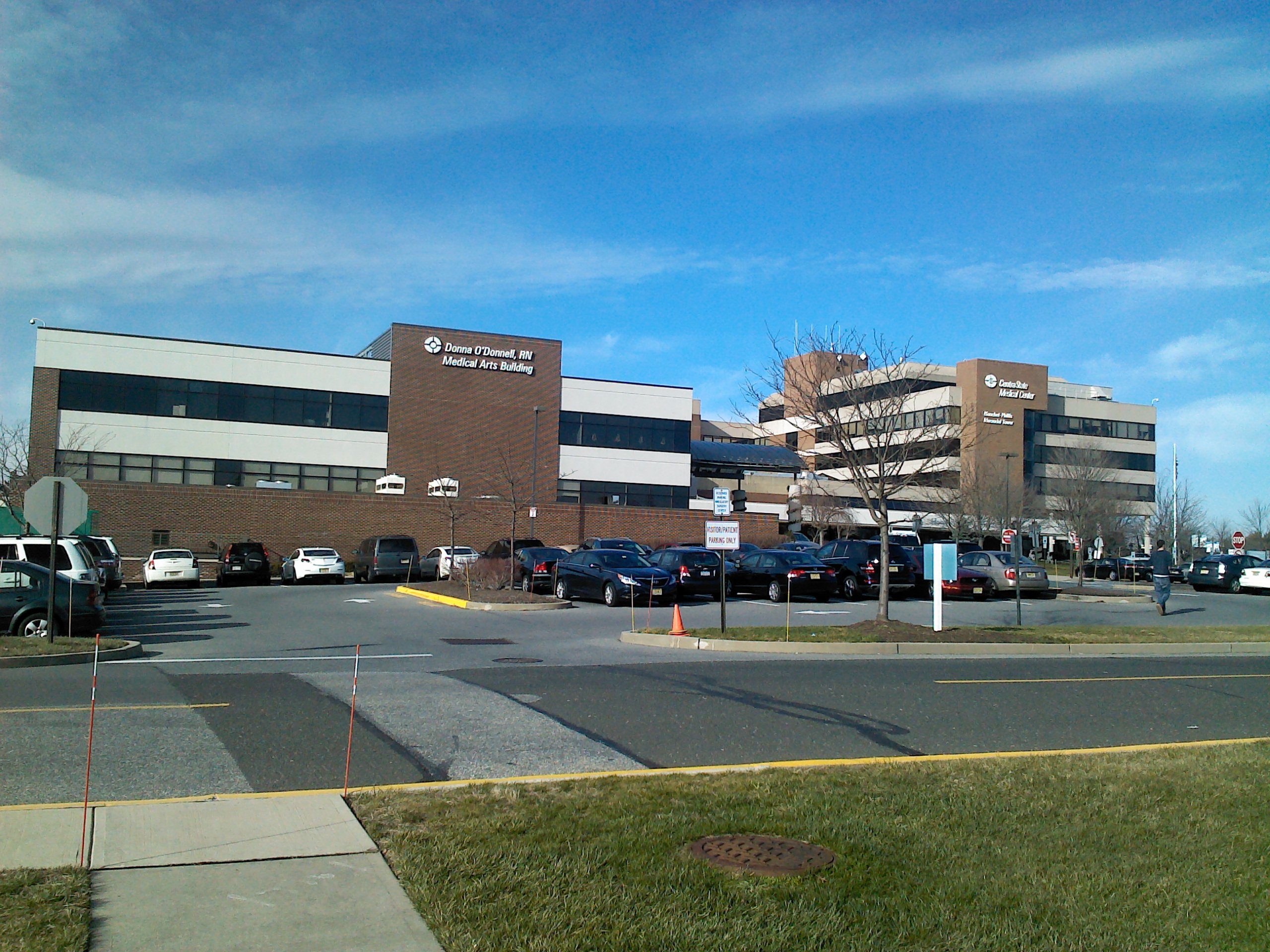
CentraState Medical Center

Millstone Township is served by CentraState Healthcare System. Located in neighboring Freehold Township, the 287-bed hospital is a partner of Atlantic Health System and is affiliated with Rutgers Robert Wood Johnson Medical School. CentraState Healthcare system also provides healthcare through its various family practices in communities across western Monmouth and southern Middlesex counties in Central Jersey. Family practices that are accessible to Millstone include locations in East Windsor and Monroe Township.

The next closest hospitals to the township are the Hamilton Division of Robert Wood Johnson University Hospital in nearby Hamilton Township, Penn Medicine Princeton Medical Center in nearby Plainsboro Township, and the Old Bridge Division of Raritan Bay Medical Center in nearby Old Bridge Township.

== Notable people ==
People who were born in, residents of, or otherwise closely associated with Millstone Township include:

- Sydney Cummings (born 1999), footballer who plays as a defender for the Brown Bears and the Guyana women's national team
- Dave Gallagher (born 1960), MLB outfielder who played for nine seasons, for the New York Mets, Philadelphia Phillies, Baltimore Orioles, Anaheim Angels, Chicago White Sox and Cleveland Indians
- Andy Miller (born 1968), harness racing driver
- Julie Miller (born 1972), harness racing driver and trainer
- Theresa Miskimen, psychiatrist and professor who became the president of the American Psychiatric Association in May 2025
- RZA (born 1969), member of Wu-Tang Clan
- Chris Smith (born 1987), basketball player for Hapoel Galil Elyon of the Israeli Liga Leumit
- J. R. Smith (born 1985), National Basketball Association player with the Cleveland Cavaliers
- Darrin Winston (1966–2008), Major League Baseball player who played two seasons for the Philadelphia Phillies

== See also ==
- Clarksburg Historic District
- Perrineville Historic District
