= Perrineville, New Jersey =

Populated place in Monmouth County, New Jersey, US

- Unincorporated community
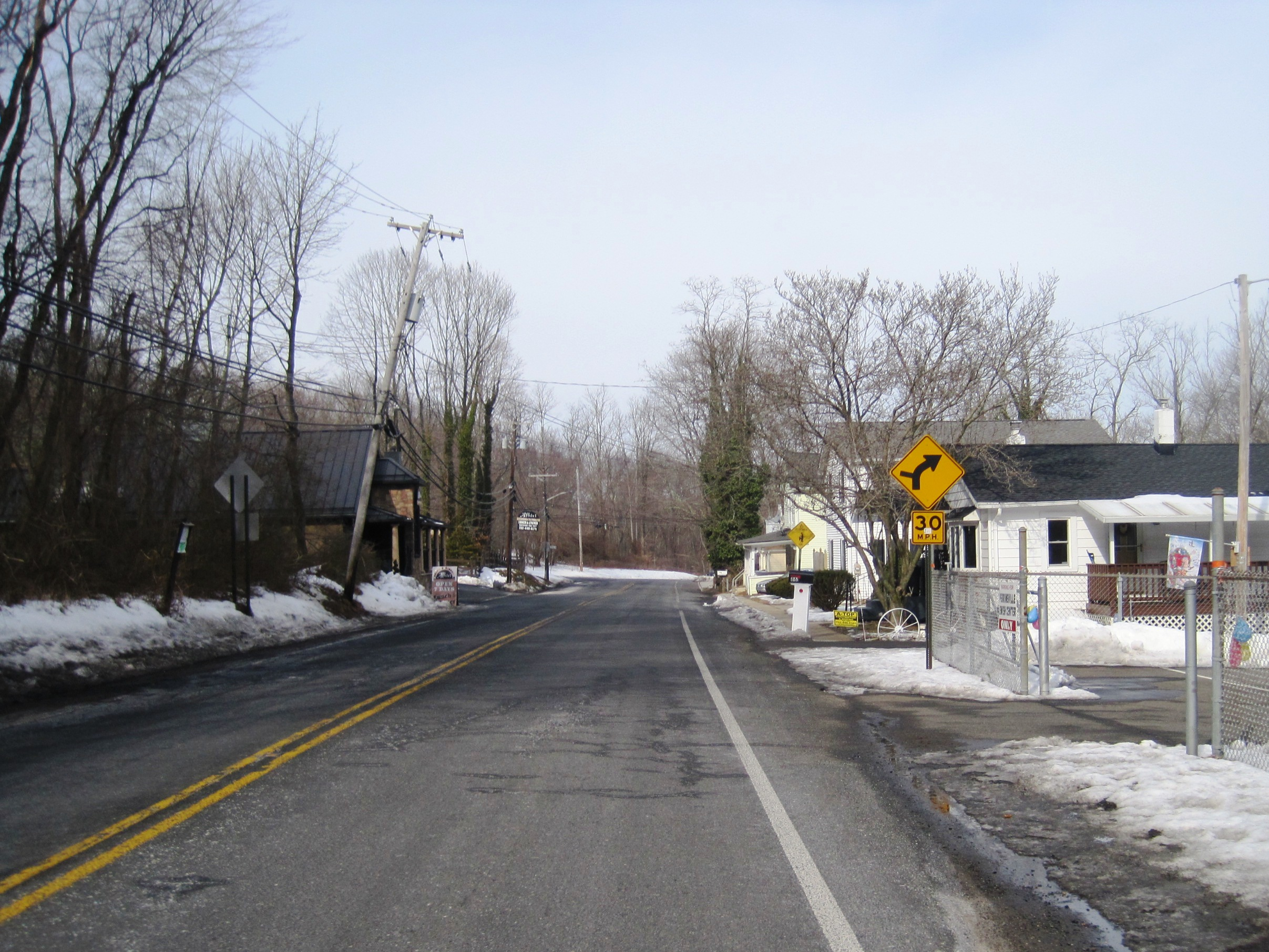
- Center of Perrineville from westbound CR 1

- Location of Perrineville in Monmouth County Inset: Location of county within the state of New Jersey Perrineville (New Jersey) Perrineville (the United States)
- Coordinates: 40°13′42″N 74°26′27″W
- Country: United States
- State: New Jersey
- County: Monmouth
- Township: Millstone
- Elevation: 154 ft (47 m)
- ZIP Code: 08535
- GNIS feature ID: 879240

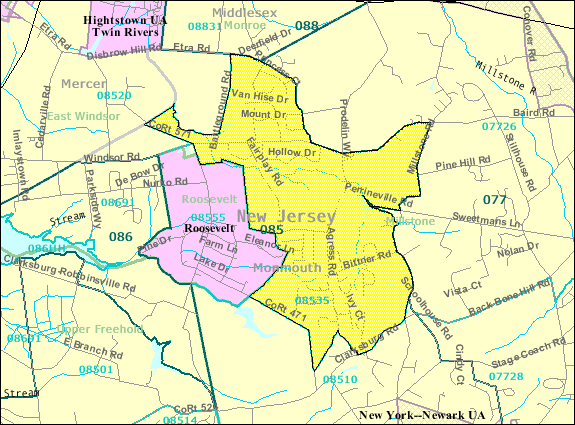
United States Census Bureau map of ZCTA 08535 Perrineville, New Jersey

Perrineville is an unincorporated community located within Millstone Township in Monmouth County, in the U.S. state of New Jersey. The area is served as United States Postal Service ZIP Code 08535.

According to the 2020–2024 American Community Survey 5-year estimates, ZIP Code Tabulation Area (ZCTA) 08535 had a population of 4,999.

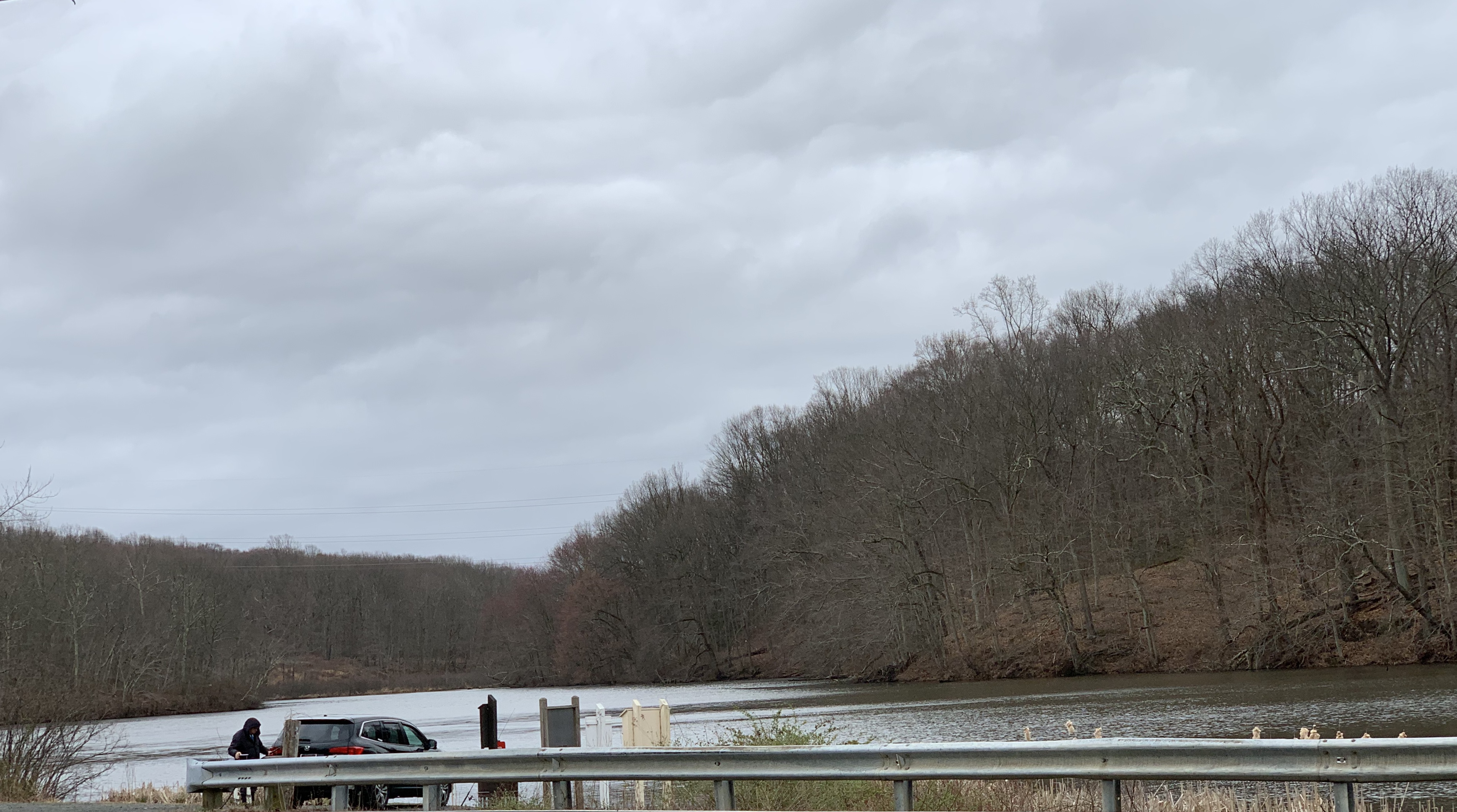
Perrineville Lake in early spring

Perrineville is located 157 feet (48 m) above sea level and is centered on Perrineville Road (County Route 1) near Agress Road. A lake in the center of the community, Perrineville Lake, is a preserved area maintained by the Monmouth County Park System.

Perrineville is home to the Perrineville Jewish Center, a synagogue established in 1910 in the center of the community. More than 130 families attend prayer services regularly, led by Rabbi Sheldon Schevelowitz.
