= Spruce Run (Raritan River tributary) =

River in Hunterdon County, New Jersey

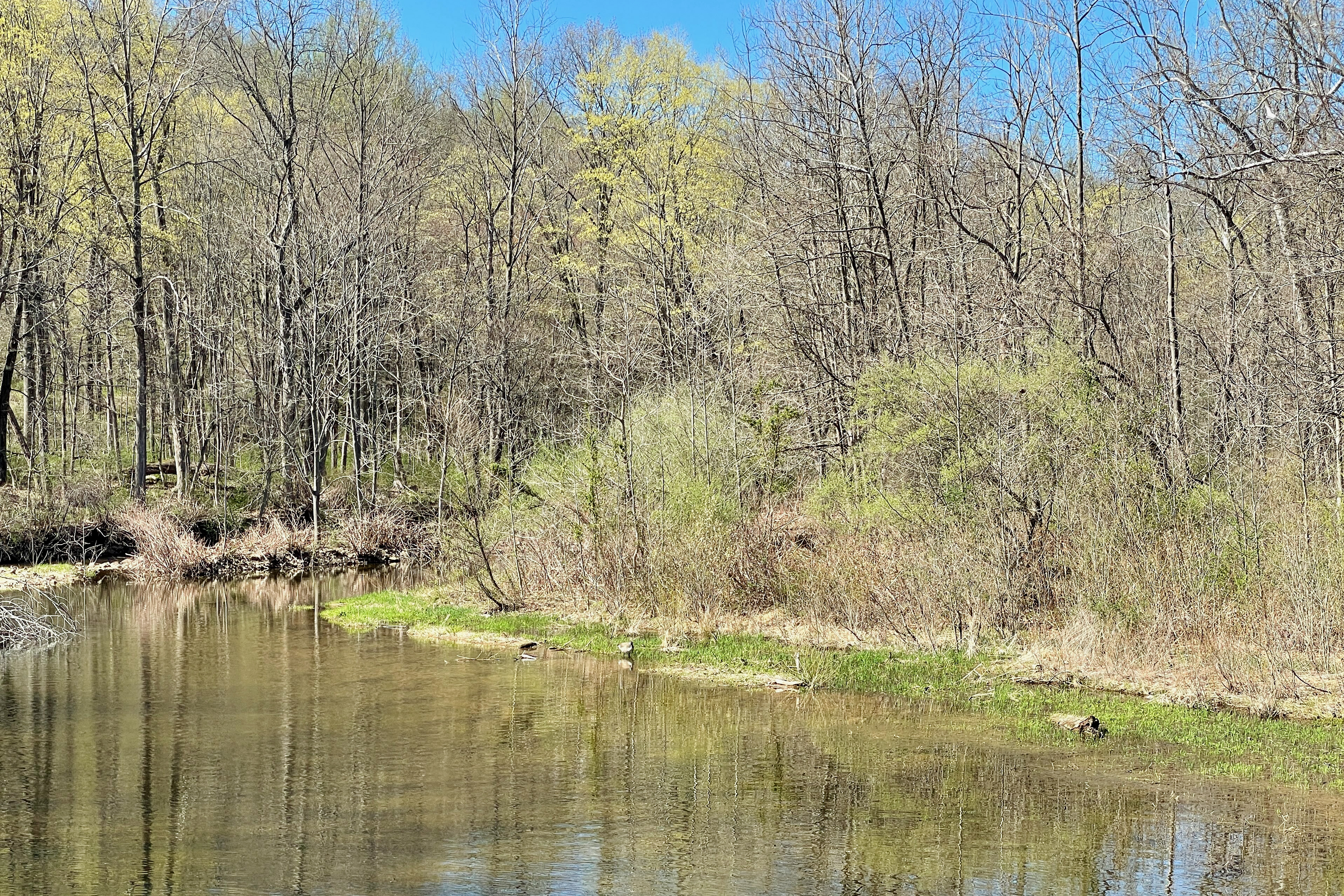
- Spruce Run near the Spruce Run Reservoir

- Location within Hunterdon County, New Jersey Location within New Jersey Location within the United States

Location
- Country: United States
- State: New Jersey
- County: Hunterdon

Physical characteristics
- Source: Schooley's Mountain
  - coordinates: 40°45′48″N 74°51′23″W
- Mouth: South Branch Raritan River
  - coordinates: 40°40′26″N 74°55′2″W

Basin features
- River system: Raritan River
- GNIS feature ID: 880826

Spruce Run is a tributary of the Raritan River in Hunterdon County, New Jersey. It starts from the southwestern slope of Schooley's Mountain, northeast of Anthony in Lebanon Township, and flows southwest toward Glen Gardner. It then flows south toward Clinton, where it joins the South Branch Raritan River. The Mulhockaway Creek is a tributary and flows from Jug Mountain. The southern slopes of the Musconetcong Mountain drain into the Spruce Run.

== History ==
In 1964, the Spruce Run Reservoir Dam was built by the New Jersey Water Supply Authority, forming the Spruce Run Reservoir. The reservoir is the third largest in the state and is encompassed by the Spruce Run Recreation Area. The source of the stream is protected, located in Crystal Springs Preserve, a county park. In addition, several sections of the stream are protected for fishing, hiking and nature observation.

== Gallery ==
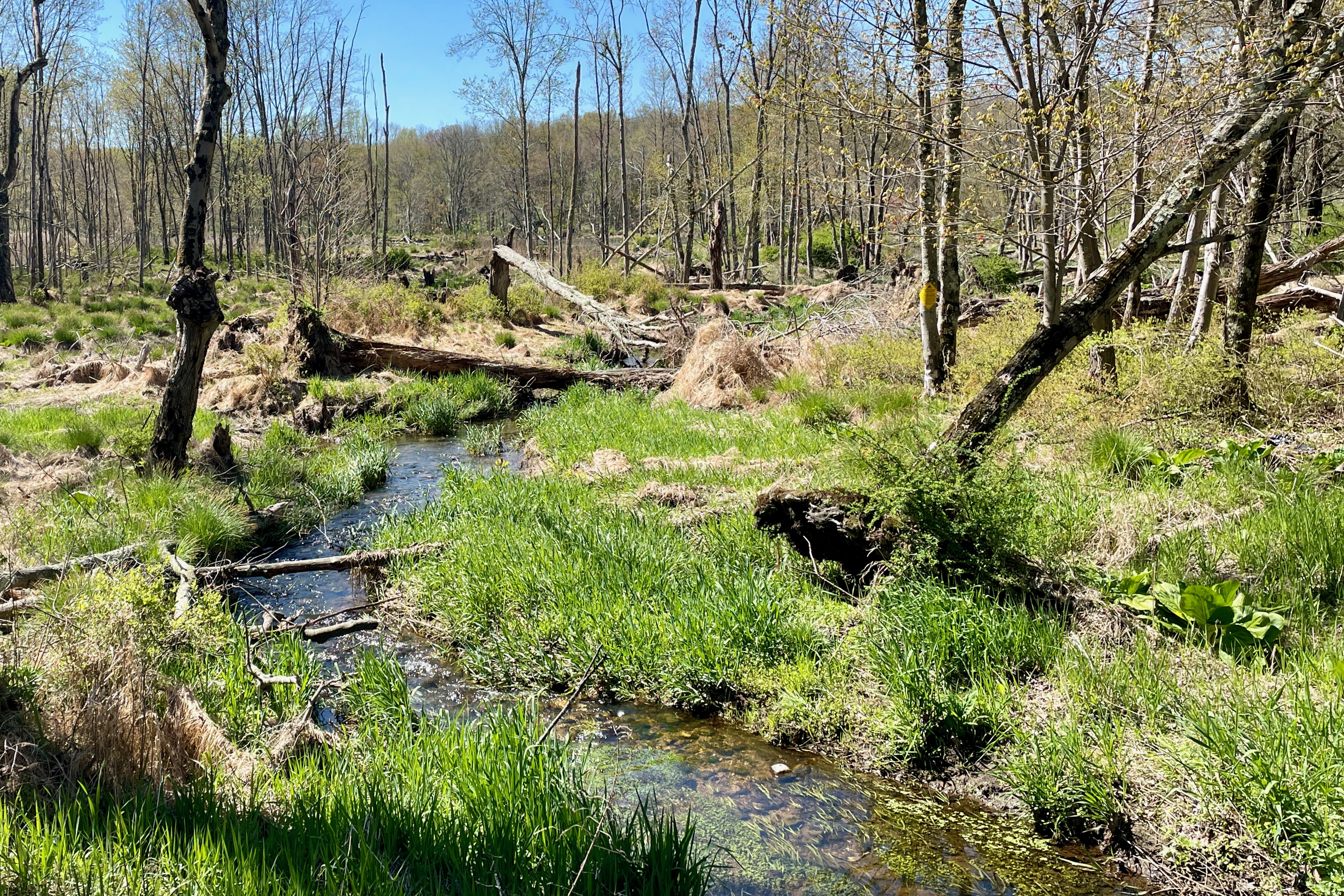
Near its source in Crystal Springs Preserve

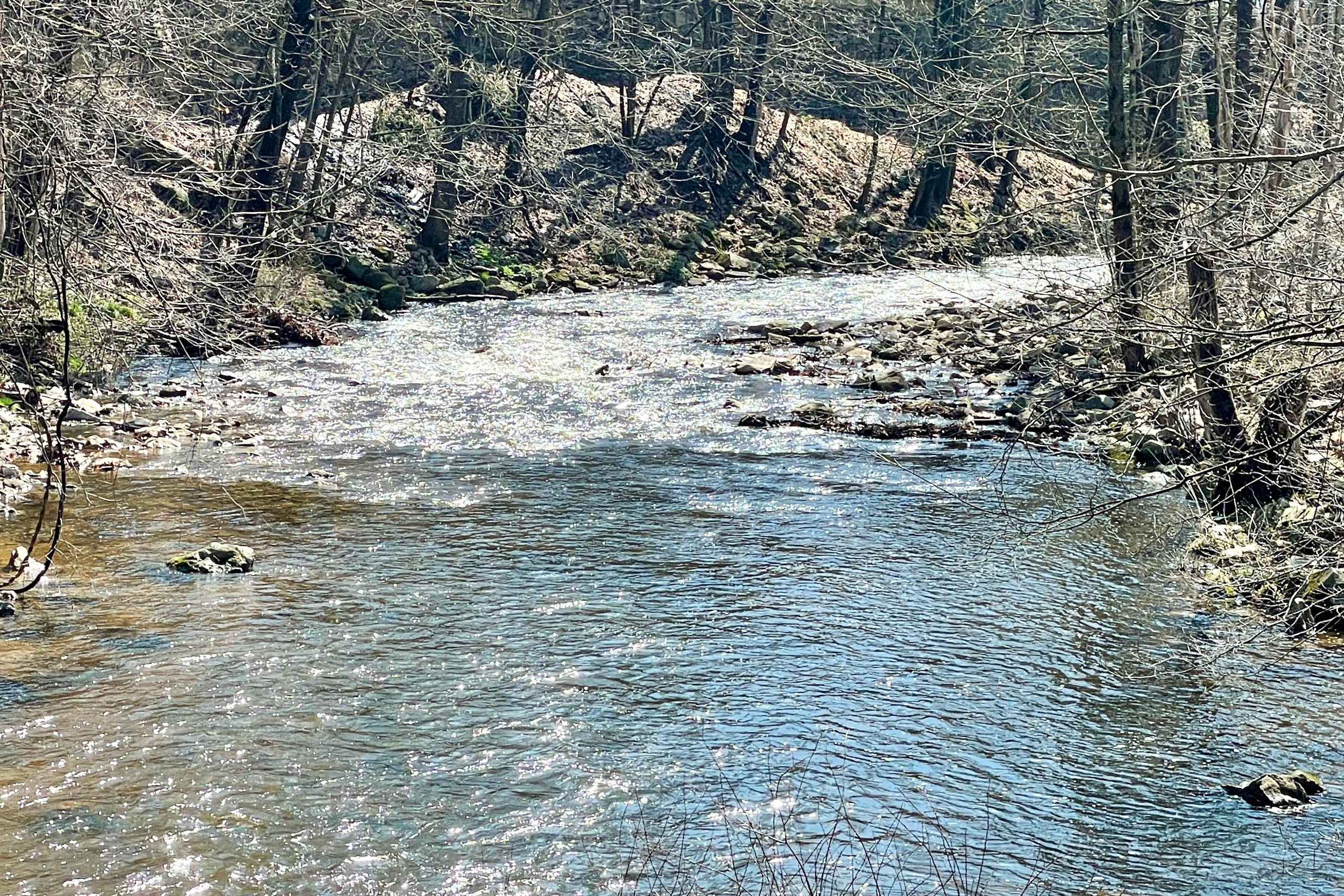
Rapids in Glen Gardner

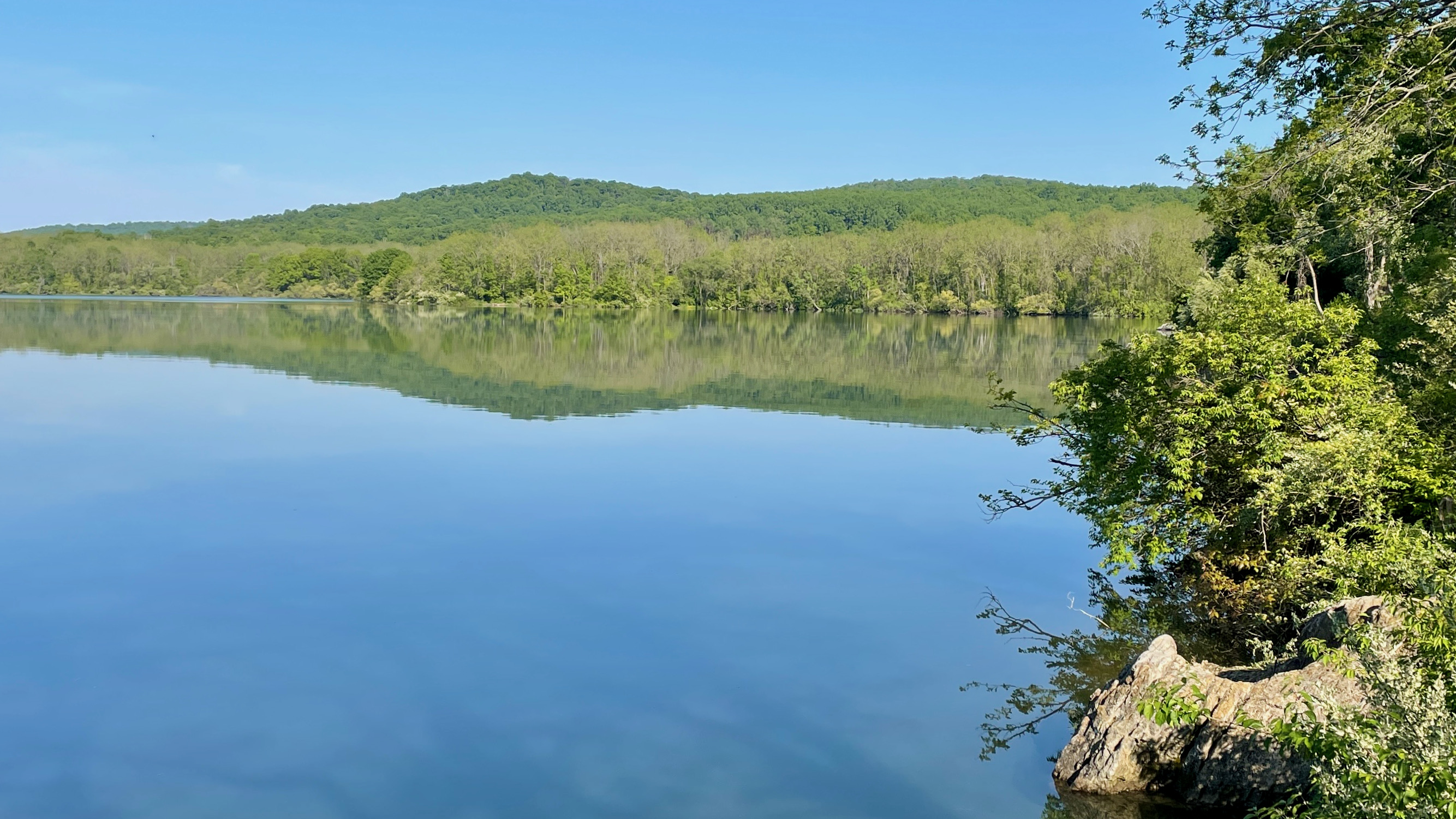
Spruce Run Reservoir

== See also ==
- List of rivers of New Jersey
