= Driscoll Bridge =

Governor Alfred E. Driscoll Bridge
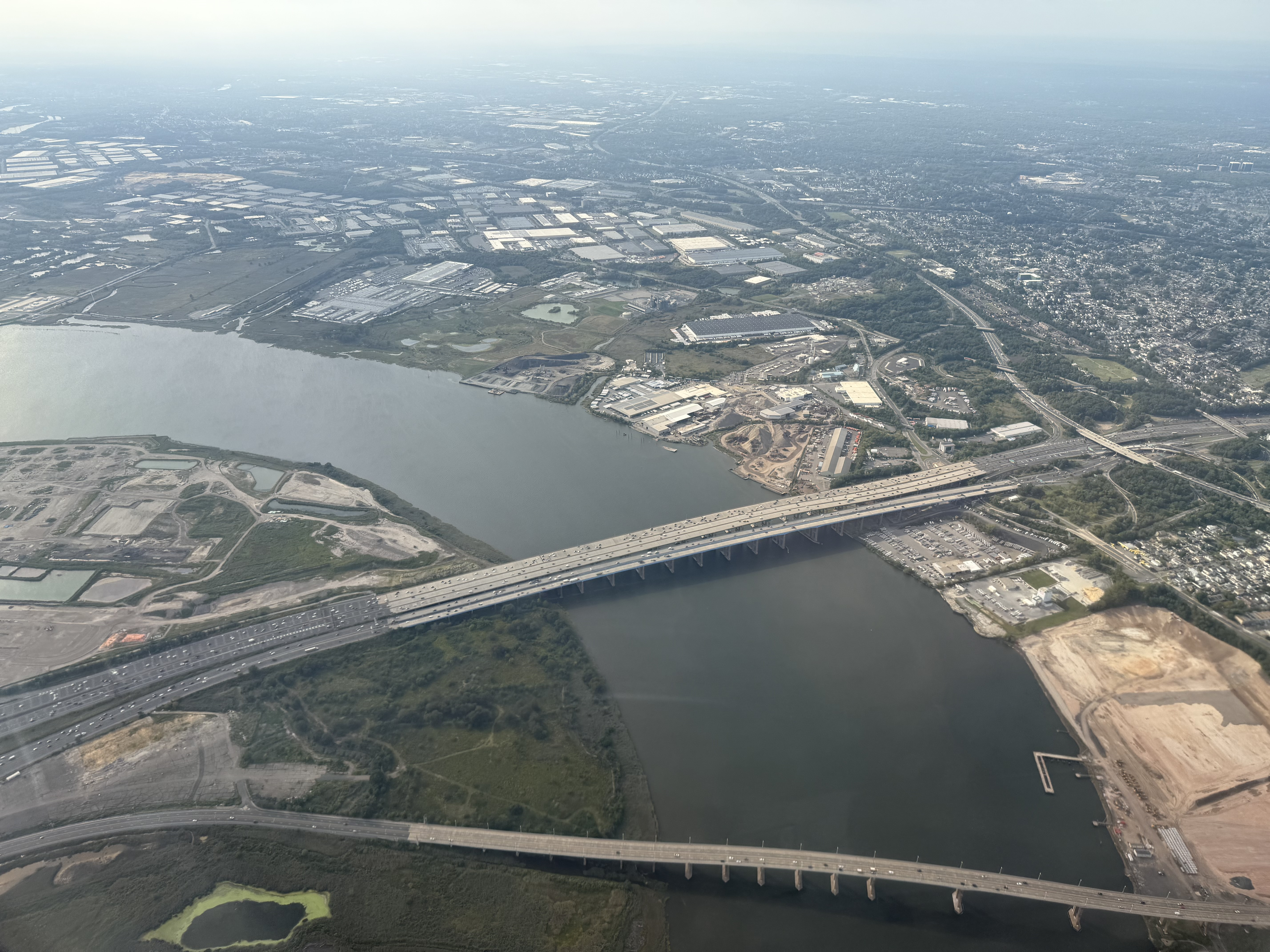
- Aerial view of the Driscoll Bridge (larger top span near center), Veiser and Edison Bridges (immediately below) and the Victory Bridge (bottom) in September 2025
- Coordinates: 40.5093°N 74.3013°W
- Carries: 15 lanes of G.S. Parkway
- Crosses: Raritan River
- Locale: Woodbridge, New Jersey and Sayreville, New Jersey in Middlesex County
- Official name: Alfred E. Driscoll Bridge
- Other name: Driscoll Bridge
- Maintained by: New Jersey Turnpike Authority

Characteristics
- Design: Box girder bridge

History
- Architect: Robinson & Steinman
- Construction start: 1952
- Opened: July 30, 1954; May 3, 2006 (southbound span)
- Rebuilt: 1970-1972, 2006-2009

Statistics
- Toll: As of January 1, 2025: $2.30 for cars with cash; $2.17 for cars with E-ZPass (southbound only)

Location
- Interactive map of Governor Alfred E. Driscoll Bridge

The Governor Alfred E. Driscoll Bridge, (colloquially referred to as the Driscoll Bridge) is a bridge on the Garden State Parkway in the central portion of the U.S. state of New Jersey, spanning the Raritan River near its mouth in Raritan Bay. The bridge connects the Middlesex County communities of Woodbridge Township on the north with Sayreville on the south. With a total of 15 travel lanes and 6 shoulder lanes, it is the world's widest and one of the busiest motor vehicle bridges. Only 30 feet (9.1 m) east of the Driscoll Bridge is the Edison Bridge, which carries U.S. Route 9. The bridge offers views of some of the taller buildings in the Lower Manhattan skyline, the New Brunswick skyline, the Verrazzano–Narrows Bridge, and the Outerbridge Crossing.

== History ==
The northbound lanes of the bridge were opened to the public with little fanfare on July 30, 1954.

In 1955, a new pier was built to allow for potential expansion.

The span was originally built with two lanes in each direction; however, this quickly proved to be inadequate, and in an attempt to reduce congestion, the bridge was restriped with six 10 feet (3.0 m) lanes in 1957.

In 1970, an expansion project began. The bridge was closed for reconstruction, to allow for the installation of a third column built on the 1955 piers in addition to a fully divided roadway deck. Work was completed in 1972, at which point the bridge was converted to serving ten lanes of traffic total.

The bridge was formally renamed in 1974 for former Governor Alfred E. Driscoll, who advocated for and oversaw the construction of the Garden State Parkway and New Jersey Turnpike.

In 1984, the timber medians were replaced with concrete barriers, allowing for the addition of one lane in each direction.

By the 2000s, the bridge was inadequate, as its narrow width and lack of emergency lanes created bottlenecks in each direction. Because of this, the bridge was later restriped to have twelve 10 feet (3.0 m) lanes, six each way.

Construction on a new southbound bridge started on September 25, 2002, and the new bridge opened to traffic on May 3, 2006. The existing span was then closed for rehabilitation, and it reopened on May 20, 2009, with eight lanes and two shoulders. The new configuration has seven southbound lanes on the newly constructed span on Parkway South, and the existing span was reduced from twelve lanes to eight lanes, with the other two converted into shoulders. The northbound span is also divided, with four lanes on each side. There are a total of five lanes of Parkway North traffic and three right lanes at Exit 127 meaning that the west side contains four lanes for through traffic on the Parkway, and the east side contains three right lanes for Exit 127 and one lane for through traffic on the Parkway. For a time, the bridge's 15 travel lanes and 6 shoulder lanes made it "the widest motor-vehicle bridge in the world by number of lanes", according to the New Jersey Turnpike Authority.

A project to repaint the original bridge began in 2012.

The speed limit on the Garden State Parkway was 45 miles per hour (72 km/h) approaching and traversing the Driscoll Bridge. However, in February 2020, the speed limit was raised to 55 miles per hour (89 km/h).

== Tolls ==
All southbound traffic crossing the Driscoll Bridge pays a toll at either the Raritan Toll Plaza or exit 125 on the Garden State Parkway, which is just north of the toll plaza. As of January 1, 2025, the toll for passenger cars at the Raritan Toll Plaza is $2.30 with cash and $2.17 with E-ZPass. Southbound exit 125 is for E-ZPass users only and also has a toll of $2.17.

== Murder on the bridge ==
On February 17, 2010, Shamshiddin Abdur-Raheem was sentenced to life in prison for the murder of his daughter by throwing her off the bridge. The body of an infant matching the girl's description was found on the south bank of the Raritan River on April 24 and was later identified as the missing girl through DNA testing.

== See also ==
- List of crossings of the Raritan River
