= Raritan River Project =

The Raritan River Project was founded by the Edison Wetlands Association (EWA) in 1995 to protect human health, quality of life, and the environment against threats, including pollution, overdevelopment, and lack of public access to waterways.

The Raritan River is the longest river solely in New Jersey, flowing through 49 municipalities, including an industrial corridor known as Central New Jersey’s “Chemical Belt”. The Raritan also flows through many of New Jersey’s 18,500 contaminated industrial sites, making it the twelfth most polluted river in U.S.

Over 200 contaminated sites are adjacent or drain into the lower Raritan River, including abandoned industrial sites, Superfund sites, old landfills, dredge dumping areas and old army arsenals. Residents continue to be exposed to toxic waste through recreational use of the river and eating contaminated fish despite warning that it may be hazardous to their health. The mission of the Raritan River Project is to clean up and protect the lower reaches of the Raritan River by identifying and reducing sources of contamination. The goal of the EWA is to stop the ongoing pollution, clean up the existing contamination and restore the watershed.
