= Spruce Run Recreation Area =

State park in Hunterdon County, New Jersey, United States

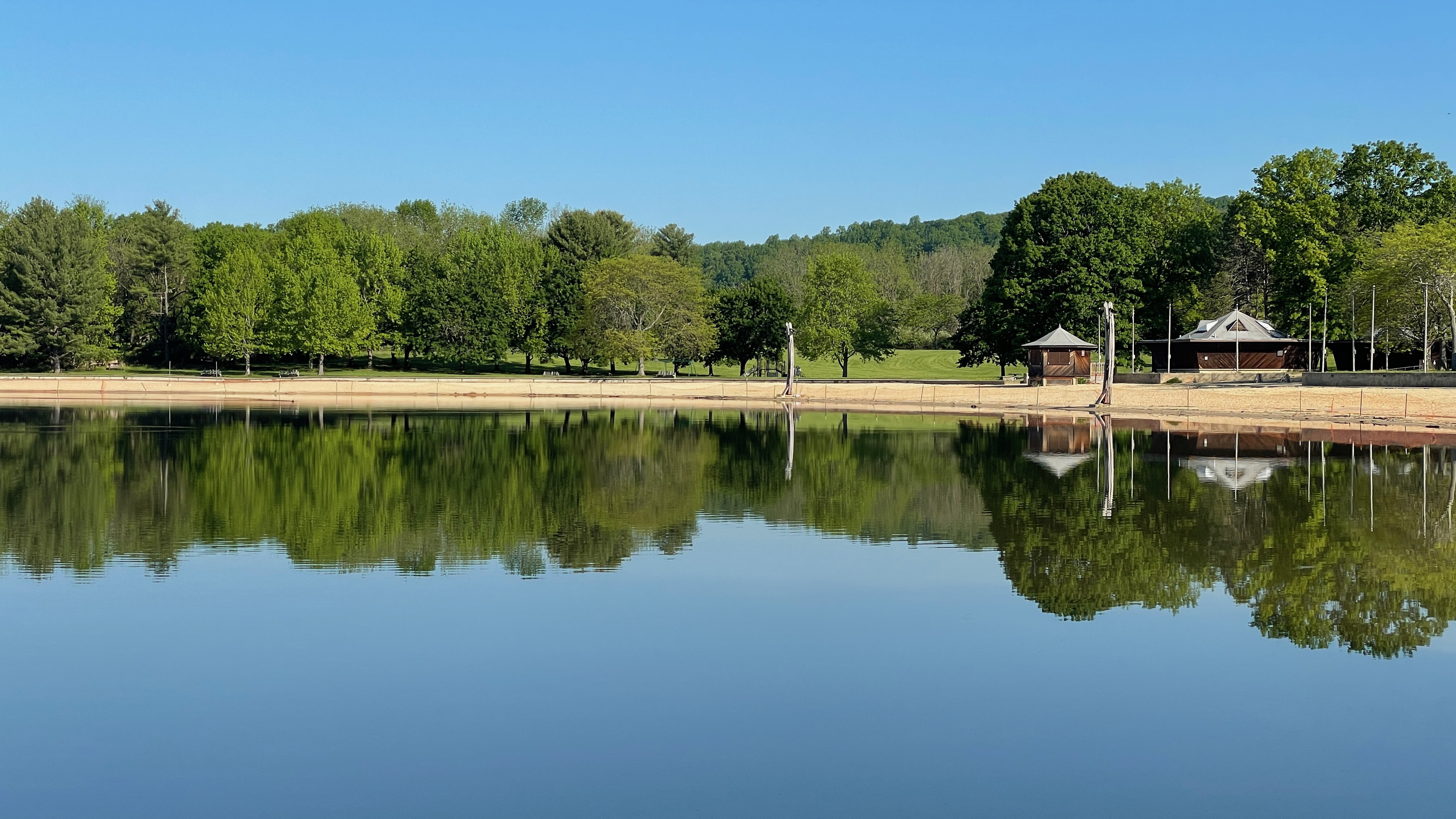
- Spruce Run Beach Area

- Location within Hunterdon County, New Jersey Location within New Jersey Location within the United States
- Coordinates: 40°39′46″N 74°56′20″W
- Area: 2,030 acres (8.2 km^{2})
- Operator: New Jersey Division of Parks and Forestry
- Website: Official website

Spruce Run Recreation Area is a 1,290-acre (5.2 km^{2}) New Jersey state recreation area located in Union Township and Clinton Township in Hunterdon County, New Jersey, United States. It encompasses the Spruce Run Reservoir that is used as a backup reservoir to protect the state from prolonged droughts. The reservoir is the third largest in the state, after Round Valley and Wanaque Reservoir. The reservoir is used for recreation purposes, including hunting, fishing, boating and swimming.

== History ==
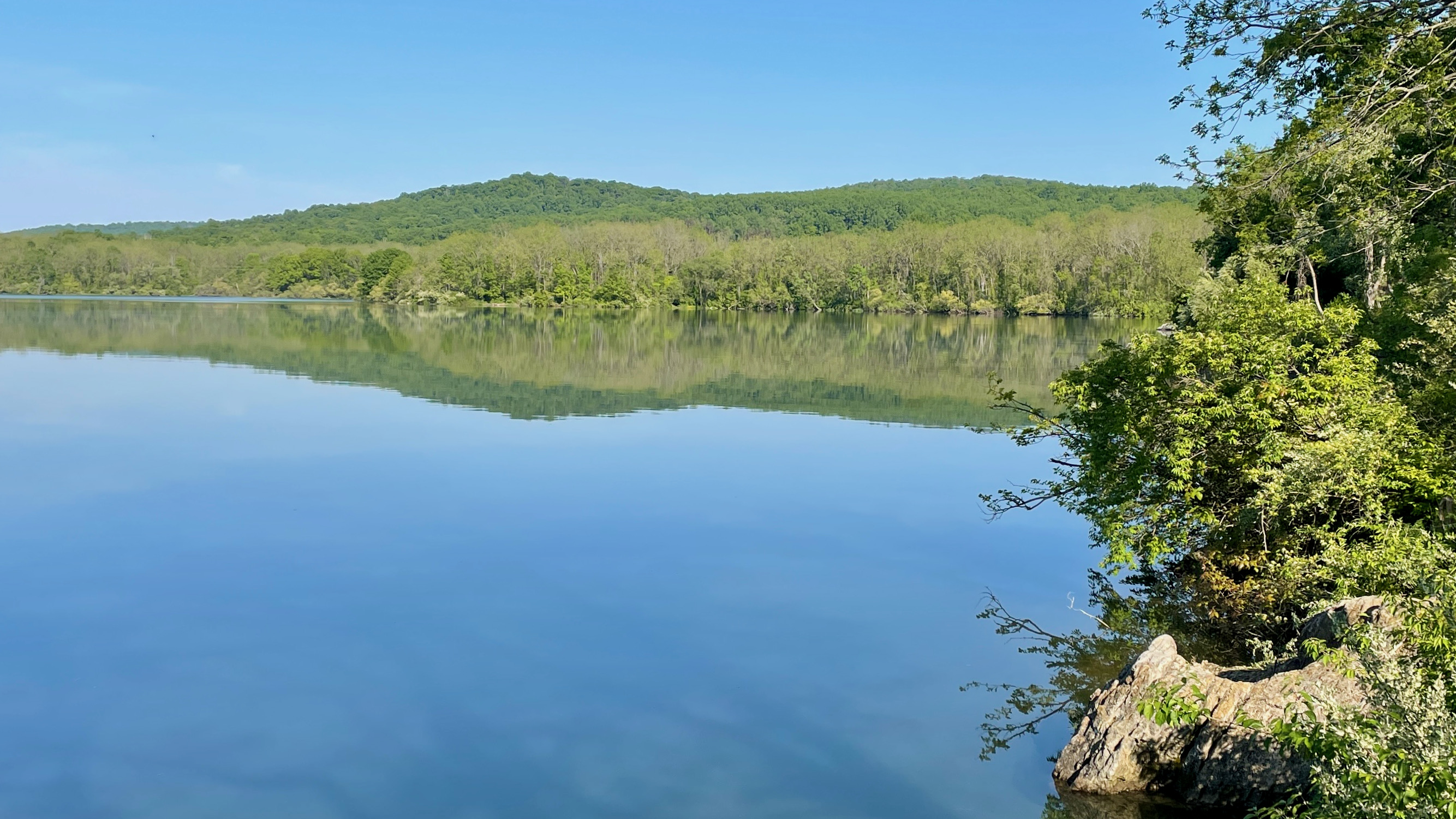
Spruce Run Reservoir

Spruce Run Reservoir Dam was a 1964 project of the New Jersey Water Supply Authority with municipal water supply as its primary use. The earthen dam is 93 feet (28 m) high, with a length of 5,400 feet (1,600 m) at its crest. The reservoir has a maximum capacity of 46,770 acre-feet (57,690,000 m^{3}) and a normal capacity of 33,670 acre-feet (41,530,000 m^{3}). The reservoir is on land formerly used for farming and metal works over the past few centuries. Prior to European colonization of the area, the land underneath the reservoir was important to the local Native Americans. Of the known Native American sites in Union Township, the majority were found on land inundated by the reservoir. The reservoir was formed by creating a series of dams that allowed two major sources, the Spruce Run and its tributary, the Mulhockaway Creek, to flood the basin that was created. In the 1920s the Elizabethtown Water Company took interest in buying the land and building a reservoir to provide for the growing water demands. The Great Depression postponed any plans to build the reservoir. The state of New Jersey resumed plans to build the reservoir in 1956, and by 1964 construction of the reservoir was completed.

At times of drought, Spruce Run feeds water into the nearby south branch of the Raritan River to supply water to more populated areas of the state downstream. The reservoir can store up to 11 billion gallons of water (42,000,000 cubic metres (1.5×10^{9} cu ft)) at full capacity. Along with Round Valley Reservoir, the reservoirs play a critical role in supply raw water to much of northern New Jersey. Water levels at the reservoir fluctuate greatly throughout the year, which has led to decreased vegetation in the photic zone. This has a variety of repercussions for fish in the lake including decreased structure and habitat for juvenile fish. In recent years the reservoir's water levels have been lowered significantly for large portions of the year.

== State park ==
The state park offers a variety of activities for patrons to enjoy. Fishing, hunting, camping, swimming, picnicking, and walking are all popular activities at the park. As with all New Jersey state parks, alcohol is prohibited within the park and reservoir. The park maintains 67 campsites which come equipped with a picnic table, fire ring, and parking spot large enough for most camping trailers and RVs. Campsites are $20 a night for in-state residents, and $25 a night for out-of-state visitors. There are also three cabins that are available for rent at the park. The campgrounds are open from April 1 through October 31.

There is a swimming beach inside the park with a staff of lifeguards when the beach is open. Swimming in the reservoir is not allowed outside of the designated swimming area. The park offers boat rentals. Available boats include pontoon boats, motor boats, and row boats. Outboards on rental boats do not exceed 10 horsepower, in accordance with the horsepower regulations for the reservoir. If a boat has a motor larger than 10 horsepower the motor should be above the waterline to ensure it is not in use. The park also offers dry boat storage for a yearly fee. In season the boats are stored near the boat launch. During the off season boats are moved to a winter storage area. The reservoir is very popular for sailing. Sailboats are limited to 25 feet (7.6 m) in length and 30 feet (9.1 m) in height above the waterline. The Hunterdon Sailing Club is based at the lake. The club runs organized sailboat racing on Sunday afternoons and Wednesday evenings in the spring, summer, and fall. They offer lessons to beginner sailors as well.

== Fishing ==
The reservoir is home to 29 different species of game fish. The Division of Fish and Wildlife supplies annually trout hatchlings to the lake and its tributaries. Other species that can be caught include largemouth bass, northern pike, smallmouth bass, carp, hybrid striped bass, yellow perch, multiple different species of sunfish, and several types of catfish including channel catfish. In the past, the state stocked the reservoir with tiger muskellunge.

Due to the reservoir's high nutrient levels the water is very conducive to primary production. As a result, the reservoir has an abundant alewife population. Since alewife inhabit open water in search of plankton, they escape predation of traditional gamefish such as largemouth bass. The state began stocking hybrid striped bass to the reservoir to increase the quality of fishing in the lake. The hybrids utilize the open water of reservoir providing a new species for anglers without reducing the quality of fishing for other game fish like largemouth bass and northern pike.

Fishing access at the reservoir is plentiful. The state park offers plenty of access for anglers throughout its shoreline. Access within the park is maintained by the park and is very well maintained offering many different locations. There are other access points to the reservoir for shore fishing along Van Syckels Road. Angling from a boat is a very popular tactic. Since the reservoir is over a thousand acres, to effectively fish large portions of the reservoir a boat of some type is necessary. The reservoir allows boats access at all hours as long as the lake remains ice free. Night fishing is very popular during summer months for anglers targeting hybrid striped bass and catfish. If the reservoir freezes over in the winter ice fishing is allowed. Popular species for ice fishing include yellow perch, northern pike, and crappie.

== Wildlife ==
The reservoir and surrounding park also provides habitat for many different species of animals. Whitetail deer are very common within the park. Bow hunting for deer is allowed. The large reservoir provides habitat for many species of waterfowl. Waterfowl hunting is allowed in the park with firearms as long as the hunter is below the high waterline.
