= Edison Bridge (New Jersey) =

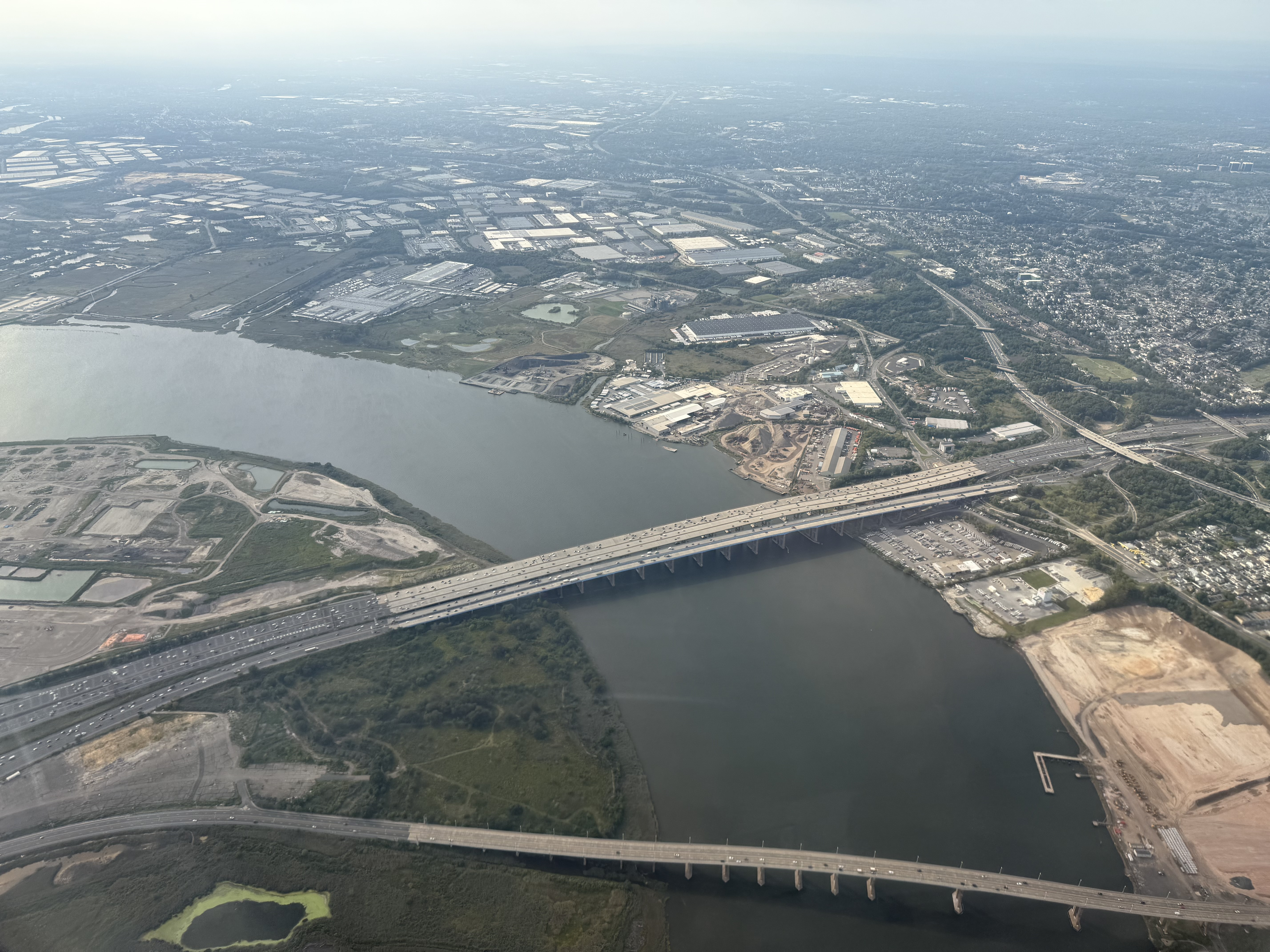
- Aerial view of the Driscoll Bridge (larger top span near center), Vieser and Edison Bridges (immediately below) and the Victory Bridge (bottom) in September 2025
- Coordinates: 40°30′32″N 74°18′02″W
- Carries: 6 lanes of US 9
- Crosses: Raritan River
- Locale: Woodbridge, New Jersey and Sayreville, New Jersey
- Official name: Thomas Alva Edison Memorial Bridge
- Other name: Ellis S. Vieser Memorial Bridge
- Maintained by: NJDOT

Characteristics
- Design: Girder
- Total length: 4,391 feet (1,338 m)
- No. of spans: 29

History
- Construction start: September 26, 1938
- Opened: October 11, 1940
- Inaugurated: December 14, 1940

Location
- Interactive map of Edison Bridge

The Edison Bridge (officially the Thomas Alva Edison Memorial Bridge) and the Vieser bridge (officially the Ellis S. Vieser Memorial Bridge) are a pair of bridges that carry U.S. Route 9 over the Raritan River near its mouth in Raritan Bay in New Jersey. The bridge, which connects Woodbridge on the north with Sayreville on the south, was opened to weekend traffic starting on October 11, 1940, and was opened permanently on November 15, 1940. As of 2003, the bridge carries more than 82,000 vehicles daily and is owned and operated by the New Jersey Department of Transportation. It also runs directly parallel to the Driscoll Bridge, which carries the Garden State Parkway.

== Construction ==
The design of the Edison Bridge was the direct responsibility of Morris Goodkind, chief engineer of the bridge division of the New Jersey State Highway Department, a position he had held since 1925.

The bridge is named for Thomas Edison. Construction on the bridge was started on September 26, 1938. The Edison Bridge was officially dedicated on December 14, 1940, with the ribbon cut by Mrs. Mina Edison Hughes, widow of the inventor. Also participating in the ceremonies were New Jersey Governor A. Harry Moore, and then Governor-elect Charles Edison, son of the inventor, along with the bridge's designer, Morris Goodkind.

The final design called for a bridge with 29 spans and an overall length of 4,391 feet (1,338 m). The nine spans over the river would consist of three continuous span girders of record-setting proportions. The main girder over the navigation channel would be 650 feet (200 m) in length, consisting of a 250-foot (76 m) span flanked by two 200-foot (61 m) spans, and would set a new U.S. record for length. The two other continuous girders were each 600 feet (180 m) in length, consisting of three 200-foot (61 m) spans.

The final cost of the bridge was $4,696,000. More than 65,000 cubic yards (50,000 m^{3}) of masonry, 50 percent buried from sight, went into the foundations, piers, and deck of the bridge. Over 2,500,000 pounds (1,133.98 metric tons) of reinforcing steel and 19,000,000 pounds (8,618.26 metric tons) of structural steel were used.

== Rehabilitation ==
As part of a $48 million construction project, a major overhaul of the aging sixty-year-old bridge was undertaken, to address issues relating to the advanced age of the structure and to bring it up to the latest highway standards. The rehabilitated northbound span of the bridge was opened on to traffic on October 21, 2003, and marked the long-awaited conversion of the old Edison Bridge from a one-span, 4-lane structure with no shoulders to a two-span bridge with a total of six lanes with shoulders.

On November 19, 2001, the southbound span was officially renamed "The Ellis S. Vieser Memorial Bridge" in a bill sponsored by Senator Joseph Kyrillos. Ellis S. Vieser, founder of the New Jersey Alliance for Action, had died on 18 June 2001. The Vieser name is rarely used by the public, with most referring to both spans as either the Edison Bridge or Route 9 Raritan River Bridge.

== See also ==
- List of bridges documented by the Historic American Engineering Record in New Jersey
- List of crossings of the Raritan River
