= Edison Wetlands Association =

Nonprofit environmental organization in New Jersey, USA

The Edison Wetlands Association was founded by noted activist Robert Spiegel in 1989 as a nonprofit environmental organization devoted to the cleanup of hazardous waste sites and the preservation of open space in densely populated central New Jersey.

EWA advocates for the cleanup of over 60 toxic waste sites, working to protect public health and the environment. EWA founded its Community Assistance Remediation Program in 2002 to empower disadvantaged grassroots citizens groups in the remediations and balanced redevelopments of local contaminated sites in their communities. Spiegel has testified three times on the Superfund before the U.S. Senate, as well as the United States National Academy of Sciences.

EWA's Conservation Program pursues the preservation of the little remaining open space in densely populated Middlesex County, as well as conservation measures. EWA developed the first-ever Middlesex County Birds report and checklist, as well as the Bald Eagle Sightings report, documenting the comeback of an endangered American icon in an urban and suburban crossroads.

EWA's leadership has been profiled in publications as diverse as the late Molly Ivins' bestselling 2003 book, Bushwhacked, and Tony Hiss's Geraldine R. Dodge publication, H2O: Highlands To Ocean. The organization is also regularly featured in United States national and regional media coverage.

== Current Campaigns ==
American Cyanamid

History- The American Cyanamid site is approximately 575 acres in size, located adjacent to the Raritan River and lies above the Brunswick Aquifer, New Jersey's second largest source for drinking water. Located in Bound Brook, NJ approximately 14,000 people live within a three-mile radius of the site. During approximately 64 years of operation, the company American Cyanamid has produced over 800 chemicals including pharmaceutical, dyes and textile chemicals, organic pigments rubber compounds, and various intermediate chemicals. During this time plant operators routinely dumped hazardous wastes, sludge, and other by-products into lagoons and pits located on the property. The lagoons and pits contained approximately 877,000 tons of waste material, causing extensive soil and groundwater contamination. Plant operators routinely dumped hazardous wastes, sludge, and other by-products into lagoons and pits located on the property. These lagoons and pits contained approximately 877,000 tons of waste material, causing extensive soil and groundwater contamination. The ATSDR Health Assessment stated contaminated groundwater, soil, and surface water were the identifiable human exposure pathways associated with the site, and potential human exposure to contaminated well water may have occurred for approximately 45 years before a groundwater control program was initiated in 1982. The ATSDR Site Review and Update Report claimed that site data reviewed indicated that any on-site groundwater contaminants that were not captured by the production wells were ultimately discharged into the Raritan River. In 1983 the site was placed on the National Priorities list, and eventually listed as a Superfund Site. Two Administrative Consent Orders were signed, one requiring to pump and treat groundwater at the rate of 650,000 gallons per day. American Home Products Corporation, now known as Wyeth, purchased American Cyanamid Company in 1994 and assumed full responsibility for environmental remediation at the site. NJDEP is the lead agency for the site.

Current Battles- The EWA is currently pushing Pfizer to fully remediate the site, arguing that the site is highly toxic and places a significant risk not only to the residents of the town, but to the residents of nearby communities due to the sites close proximity to the Raritan River. Furthermore, they have expressed the concerns of members of the surrounding communities who believe that the EPA has been coerced into an incomplete cleanup plan that has Pfizers interests at heart over the publics. The EPA has suggested a remediation plan that includes environmental caps and redeveloping a portion of it in the future. This redevelopment will occur on the site which is located within a flood plain, something the EPA failed to address in their feasibility study released in early 2012. The mayor of Bridgewater, the New Jersey Department of Environmental Protection, and other key community leaders also came out to endorse the plan without considering the amount of increased flooding that is going to take place if such a plan is implemented. The EWA is pushing a different plan that encompasses a complete remediation of the soil that will not leave the community at further risk.

Pompton Lakes

History- The EWA is currently pushing for a Superfund status for Pompton Lakes, a community located in northern New Jersey. DuPont began manufacturing explosives in the town when it acquired Laflin & Rand Powder Company in 1902. During World War 1, employment and production at the factories surged, where the company size increased from 300 to a high of 7,500. Production mainly focused on munitions, including rifle and hand grenades, blasting caps, detonating fuses, boosters, and primer. During World War II production and employment once again increased, and employees were bussed in from surrounding cities to meet this demand. Once again production centered around munitions.

The end of the War brought in additional demands for manufacturing and explosives that lasted for roughly three decades. It was during this time where the contamination of the town became most prevalent. For decades the Acid Brook which ran through the munition factory carried contaminants such as mercury through the town into the Lake. Due to these issues, the company has been ordered by the New Jersey State, and Federal Government to remediate the site, however residents have complained that the company has dragged its feet. In 2008 it had been discovered that toxic vapors were seeping from the soil into around 430 homes that were located near the toxic groundwater. A 2009 study also had shown elevated cancer rates in the area

DuPont has claimed that it had does all it can, and Bonnie Bellow a spokeswomen for the EPA stated that the reason why the site has not received a Superfund designation was because the plant was still in operation when cleanup efforts began in the 1980s. The EWA and the Citizens for a Clean Pompton Lakes have disagreed, believing that the government has taken much too long of a time in the cleanup, and that a Superfund designation would force DuPont to spend the more money and clean up the site faster. New Jersey Senator Robert Menendez also agreed, and sent a letter to federal EPA commissioner Lisa Jackson, asking why a Superfund designation has not even been considered for the site, even though it clearly meets all of the specifications.

== New Green Media ==
Also run by the EWA is NewGreenMedia.tv, a website which presents a single clearinghouse for green, sustainable, and environmental news across New Jersey. The site is designed the population of New Jersey informed on the various issues that affect them. Examples of this include posting Administration warnings to the public to take precautions against mosquitos, information about the findings of algae located off of New Jersey Beaches, and reporting on calls from environmentalists to prevent further development from going into Barnegat Bay.

In addition to original stories and videos, NewGreenMedia provides daily breaking news from mainstream media, such as posting an NBC News report on dozens of dead birds falling from the sky onto New Jersey beaches.

== Wild New Jersey ==
As the only daily nature blog in the Garden State, WildNewJersey.tv reaches over 140,000 readers as a one-stop source for everything need on wildlife and conservation in the Northeast. Founded by the nonprofit Edison Wetlands Association, WildNewJersey.tv offers daily breaking news, features, photo investigations, and videos about New Jersey's wildlife, conservation, and nature events.

The blog is updated four times daily to cover everything from the bears and bobcats of the rugged northwest N.J., to birds of Cape May, to the skyscraper-dwelling peregrine falcons of Jersey City, to the dolphins, seals, and sharks of our coastline.

WildNewJersey.tv also depends on readers to contribute their own sightings and stories, press releases, eye-catching photos, colorful anecdotes, links to interesting articles and sites, and event announcements.

== Triple C Ranch ==
In addition to its environmental justice, conservation, and sustainability efforts, EWA also runs the Triple C Ranch, which is also the last farms in Middlesex County New Jersey.

The 40-acre ranch is located in the center of the Dismal Swamp Conservation area, which consists of approximately 1,2000 acres of environmentally sensitive wetlands, upland forest, and meadows.

EWA had become involved with the farm after it had fallen into considerable disrepair, finally purchasing the property from the estate of Christopher C Christensen in April 2001. Since then EWA has rehabilitated the barn, chicken coop, and other structures located on the site. Furthermore, EWA created a network of trails in the area that provide a variation of recreational opportunity, ranging from fishing, wildlife photography and bird watching.

The farm is open to the public every Saturday and Sunday, 11-4 from May to Mid-November. Other activities the Triple C Ranch provides is the opportunity to interact with a host of animals, which include a pot bellied pig (Edison), 5 goats (Cowie, Peanut, Savannah, Creampuff and Peppy), a pony (Shorty), ram (Jack), chickens (Tofu and Sucky), roosters (Blackjack and Rusty), and ducks (Lucy and Patrick). The farm itself also lays host to many animals native to the area, including hawks, herons, turtles, and deer.

The EWA also provides an Environmental Education program designed to foster a love for the outdoors as well as environmental awareness. Some activities include environmental scavenger hunts, and wildlife analysis.

== See also ==
- Raritan River Project
