= Peters Brook (Raritan River tributary) =

Stream in Somerset County, New Jersey

Coordinates: 40°35′28″N 74°37′54″W

Peters Brook is a tributary of the Raritan River that flows south through Bridgewater Township and Somerville, New Jersey, in the United States. Some of its tributaries include Ross Brook and Mac's Brook.

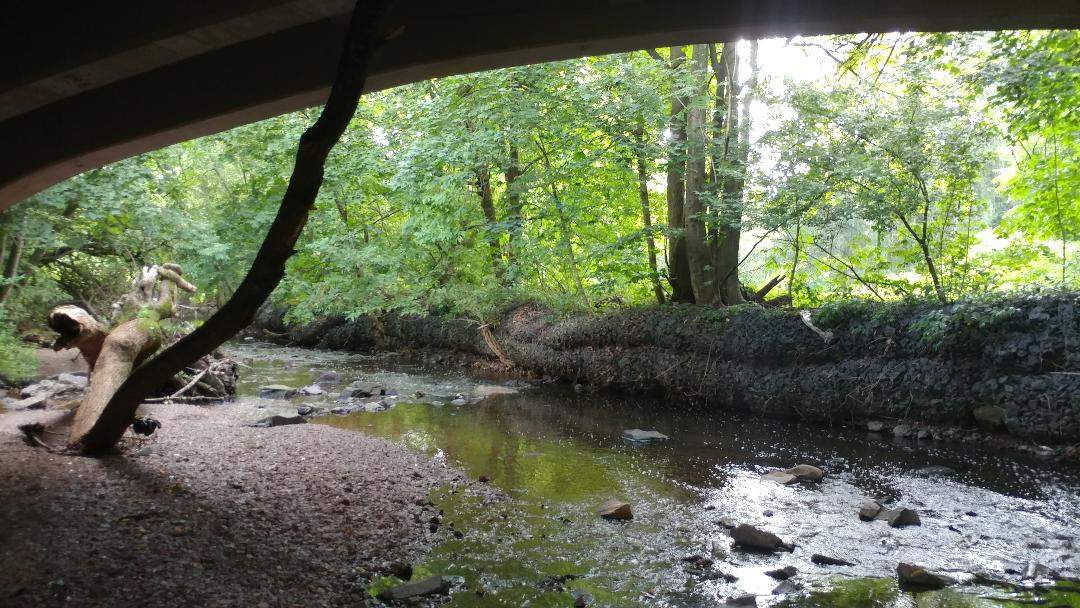
Peters Brook, Somerville, New Jersey

Peters Brook is approximately six miles long, beginning near the west side of I-287 and emptying into the Raritan River south of Somerville.

The Brook is named for Peter Van Nest, son of Dutch immigrant Pieter Van Nest. The homestead of the Van Nest family was in nearby Raritan near Glaser Avenue.

Peters Brook is notable for having high phosphate levels and flooding, receiving large amounts of stormwater.

== Peters Brook Greenway ==
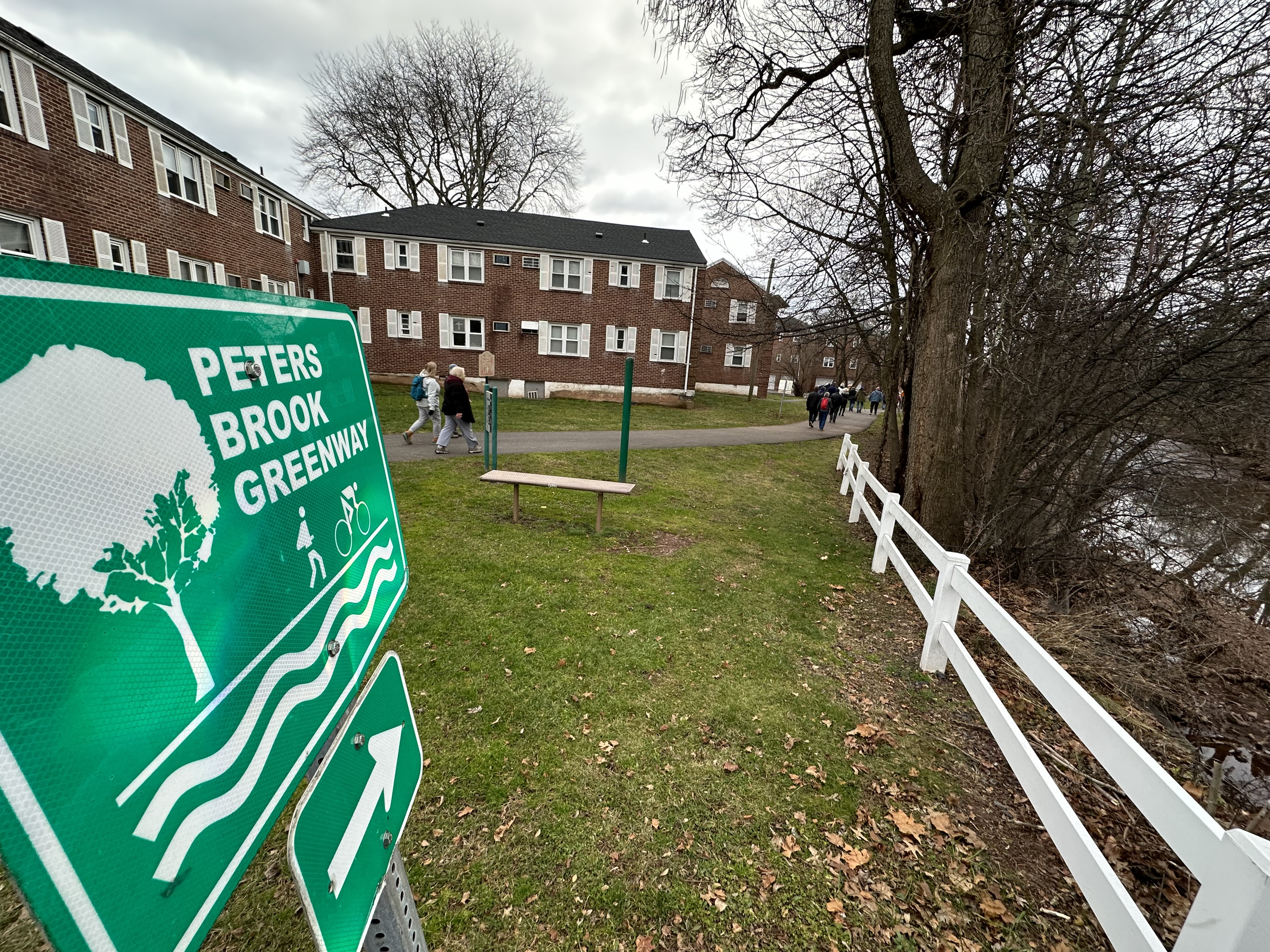
Greenway entry point at Mountain Avenue in Somerville

A 1.5-mile-long gravel pathway in Somerville traces the course of the brook through the borough. The trail is about eight feet wide and runs from Mountain Avenue to High Street. The brook also traverses Flockhart Park, which is accessible from US-202 South in Bridgewater right before the Somerset Shopping Center and Somerville Circle exit. Flockhart Park was named after former Somerville Mayor Thomas Flockhart.

== Crossings ==
=== In Bridgewater ===
- Talamini Road
- Garretson Road
- Somerset Corporate Boulevard
- US 22
- US 202

=== In Somerville ===
- Mountain Avenue
- Mercer Street
- Davenport Street
- North Bridge Street
- Grove Street
- East Cliff Street
- East High Street (1911)
- East Main Street
- South Side Avenue

== See also ==
- List of rivers of New Jersey
