= Raritan River =

Major river in the U.S. state of New Jersey

Raritan River Rariton
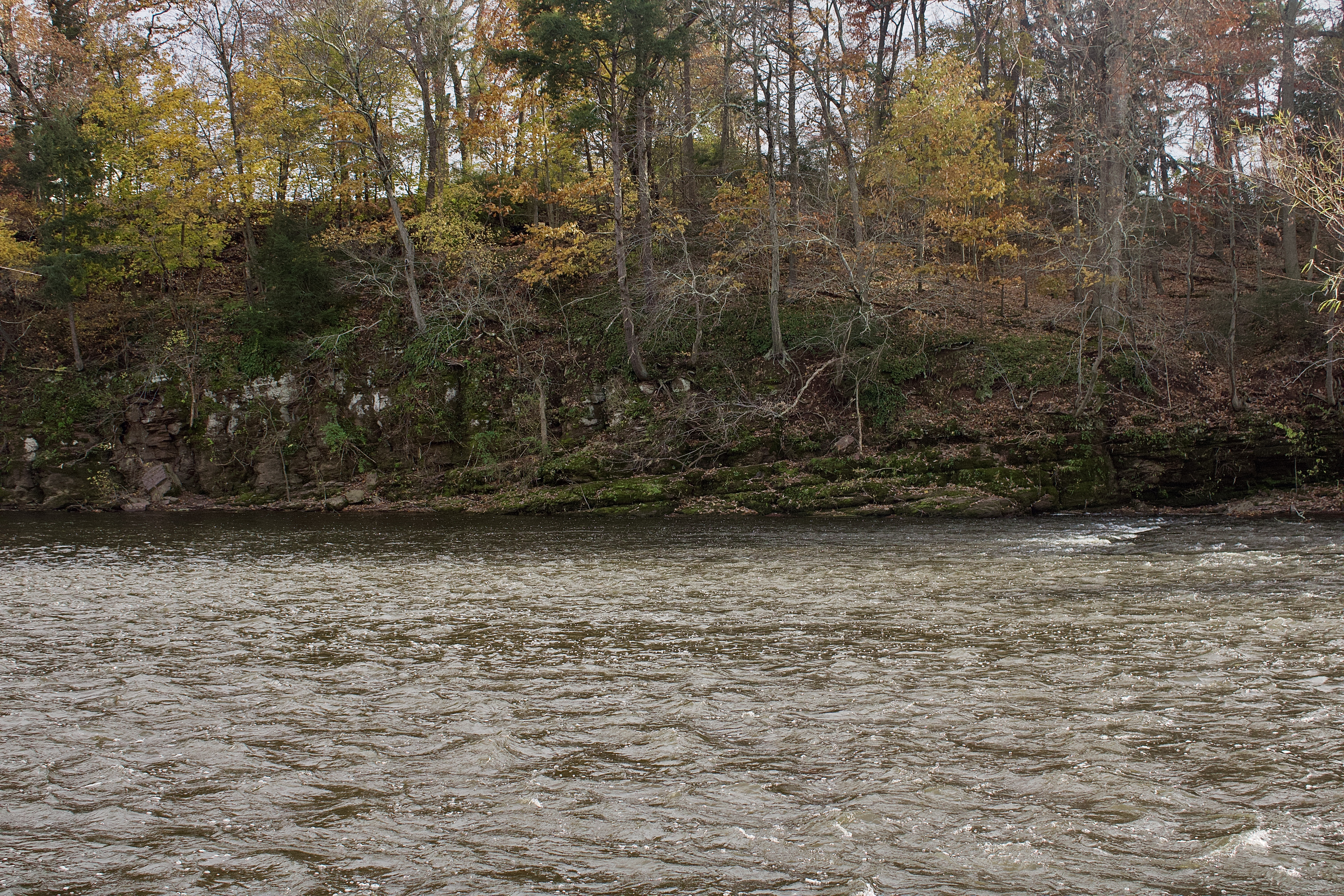
- Raritan River as seen from Bridgewater Township, New Jersey

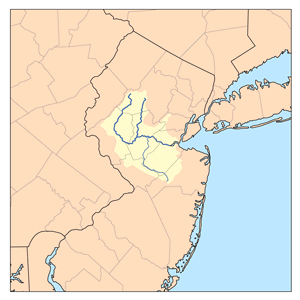
- Raritan River watershed: empties near Staten Island in Raritan Bay on the Atlantic Ocean.
- Etymology: Raritan Indian tribe

Location
- Country: United States
- State: New Jersey
- Counties: Hunterdon, Mercer, Middlesex, Monmouth, Morris, Somerset, Union
- Municipalities: Raritan, Clinton, Bridgewater Township, Somerville, Bound Brook, South Bound Brook, Piscataway, Franklin Township, New Brunswick, Highland Park, Edison, East Brunswick, Sayreville, Woodbridge, Perth Amboy, South Amboy

Physical characteristics
- Source
  - location: Confluence of South Branch Raritan River and North Branch Raritan River
  - coordinates: 40°33′20″N 74°41′14″W
  - elevation: 47.7 ft (14.5 m)
- Mouth
  - location: Raritan Bay
  - coordinates: 40°29′41″N 74°16′17″W
  - elevation: 0 ft (0 m)
- Length: 69.6 mi (112.0 km)
- Basin size: 1,100 sq mi (700,000 acres; 2,800 km^{2})
- Width
  - average: 200 ft (61 m)
- Depth
  - minimum: 9 ft (2.7 m)
  - maximum: 25 ft (7.6 m)
- Discharge
  - location: Bound Brook
  - average: 1,070 cu ft/s (30 m^{3}/s)
  - minimum: 100 cu ft/s (2.8 m^{3}/s)
  - maximum: 10,800 cu ft/s (310 m^{3}/s)

Basin features
- Population: ~1.2 million
- Tributaries
  - left: Peters Brook, Cuckles Brook, Middle Brook, Green Brook, Mill Brook, Red Root Creek, Crows Mill Creek
  - right: Dukes Brook, Millstone River, Fox Creek, Mile Run, Lawrence Brook, South River
- Bridges: Victory Bridge, Edison Bridge, Driscoll Bridge, New Jersey Turnpike, U.S. Highway No. 1 Bridge, highway bridge over South River at the town of South River

The Raritan River is a river of the U.S. state of New Jersey. Its watershed drains much of the mountainous areas in the northern and central sections of the state, emptying into the Raritan Bay near Staten Island on the Atlantic Ocean.

== History ==
Geologists assert that the lower Raritan provided the course of the mouth of the Hudson River from the late Pleistocene to the early Holocene. Toward the end of the last ice age, the Narrows was blocked by glacial till and the Hudson flowed along the Watchung Mountains to present-day Bound Brook, then followed the course of the Raritan eastward into Lower New York Bay.

The name Raritan possibly derives from a branch of the Lenape people called the Nariticongs, the first people known to settle the Raritan Valley.

Following conflict with the arriving Dutch colonists, the native people of the region, especially the Sanhican, were forced to sell their territory near the Raritan Bay and move further inland along the river valley. As English colonists took over the region, they took advantage of the river's location between New York and Philadelphia as well as a road network developed by the Lenape to turn the region into a transportation and commercial hub. As a result, the Raritan River became an important waterway for colonial travel and trade, allowing for the development of trade centers like Raritan Landing and New Brunswick, where agricultural and raw material goods could be sold.

During the American Revolutionary War, the river was the site of guerilla warfare by American militiamen against British patrols, culminating in the Battle of Bound Brook where a large British force attacked an American outpost south of the river.

The success of the Erie Canal (completed in 1825) sparked a "canal fever" in the United States, catalyzing the construction of the Delaware and Raritan Canal (D&R) between New Brunswick on the Raritan and Bordentown on the Delaware River. The D&R was completed in 1834 and provided a critical link between Philadelphia (and the rest of the greater Mid-Atlantic region, at large) and New York (and the rest of the greater New England region, at large), as these cities were situated along the crucial rivers of the Delaware and the Hudson, respectively. The vast majority of traffic along the canal was Pennsylvania anthracite coal with the rest consisting mostly of agricultural and textile goods. At its peak in 1866 the D&R transported more cargo than the Erie Canal. In 1932 the D&R canal shut down for commercial use. In 1974 the canal was developed as a state park for recreational use and remains in use as a water supply for central New Jersey. Various mill towns were formed along the canal and the aforementioned river (and tributaries), most notably (from south to north / west to east) being Trenton, Kingston, Blackwells Mills, Griggstown, Hillsborough, Manville, Chester, Bernards, Clinton, Raritan, Milltown, and Woodbridge.

== Description ==
The main Raritan River forms at the confluence of the North Branch Raritan River and the South Branch Raritan River, just west of Somerville at the border of Bridgewater, Branchburg, and Hillsborough Townships.

The North Branch Raritan River's headwaters are located in Mendham Borough and it flows from out of Morris County southward into Somerset County, to the southern end of the Watchung Mountains. The South Branch Raritan River's headwaters are located at Budd Lake (a glacial remnant a few miles northeast of Hackettstown), and it flows out of Morris County, through the heart of Hunterdon County, and along the western edge of Somerset County.

After the confluence of the North and South branches, the Raritan River flows for approximately 16 mi (26 km), before slowing in tidewater at New Brunswick. Its estuary extends 14 mi (23 km) more, entering the western end of Raritan Bay at South Amboy.

Comprehensive measures have been taken to reduce the pollution and increase the water quality. These actions have benefited the fish population which include (but are not limited to) largemouth bass, smallmouth bass, sunfish, catfish, trout, chain pickerel, american eels, carp and yellow perch. Pike can be found in relative abundance in some portions of the river like Clinton and Califon. An occasional Musky has been taken out of the Raritan as well. The tidal portions of the river host migratory salt water species such as striped bass, fluke, winter flounder, weakfish and bluefish. Recently, efforts to restore anadromous fish populations have been made, done by removing many of the obsolete dams and the constructing dam bypass infrastructure. Hopefully this will result in restoring shad, striped bass, and sturgeon populations in the river. Many songbirds, wading birds, and waterfowl make their homes in and along the length of the river, such as mallards, canadian geese, great blue herons, double-crested cormorants, and common mergansers. Common songbirds include the american robin, song sparrow, northern mockingbird, common grackle, and the Red-winged blackbird. Crustaceans such as blue claw crab, fiddler crabs and green crabs are also found in the tidal sections of the river. Crayfish can be found farther upstream.

The river is also used for recreational boating, including use by the rowing team of Rutgers University in New Brunswick. The river is featured in the title of Rutgers' alma mater, On the Banks of the Old Raritan, and its flooding is mentioned in the song.

Near its mouth, the river is spanned by the Raritan Bay Drawbridge, a New Jersey Transit railroad bridge which carries the North Jersey Coast Line; the Victory Bridge which carries Route 35 (connecting Perth Amboy and Sayreville, New Jersey); the Edison Bridge, which carries U.S. Route 9 (connecting Woodbridge Township and Sayreville); and the Driscoll Bridge, which carries the Garden State Parkway (connecting Woodbridge Township and Sayreville).

== Water supply ==
The Raritan River is an important source of drinking water for the central portion of New Jersey. A water filtration plant operated by New Jersey American Water is located in Somerset and draws its water at the confluence of the Raritan River and its largest tributary (the Millstone River), providing an average of 132,000,000 US gallons (500,000 m^{3}) of water per day.

The New Jersey Water Supply Authority operates two reservoirs off of the Raritan river, the Spruce Run Reservoir and Round Valley Reservoir, and controls releases of water to ensure the “minimum passing flow rates” enforced by the New Jersey Department of Environmental Protection. Additionally, the Delaware and Raritan Canal, managed by the New Jersey Water Supply Authority, serves as a water supply that pumps over 100,000,000 US gallons (380,000 m^{3}) of water per day from the Delaware to the Raritan river and serves over 1 million customers along the way

== Flooding ==
The Raritan River has persistent flooding problems when excessive rain from storms affects the river basin. Historically, the flooding problems mainly affected the town of Bound Brook, which is partially built on a natural floodplain at the junction of several tributaries, and Manville, which has a large neighborhood known as Lost Valley that lies on the floodplain between the Raritan River and its largest tributary river, which is known as the Millstone River. However, extensive flood control measures over several decades significantly reduced flooding risk in Bound Brook. Other towns in the Raritan River basin also experience flooding to a lesser degree.

Record flooding in the aftermath of Hurricane Floyd in September 1999 (42.13 ft (12.84 m)) flood crest, 14 ft (4.3 m) above flood stage) caused renewed interest in a flood control project called the Green Brook Flood Control Project, which is designed to protect Bound Brook from a 150-year flood. In August 2011, record flooding occurred once again after Hurricane Irene swept through the area. This problem was exacerbated by well-above average rainfall that fell in the weeks before the storm hit, and spurred completion of the Army Corps of Engineers flood control project. As of 2015, the current status of this project is:

1. The R2 levee system is functionally complete – The R2 Levee System is designed to provide Bound Brook with protection from a 150-year flood level. The levee is built to the height of the raised Talmage Avenue Bridge.
2. Closure gates along Raritan are functionally complete – The gate closures across the New Jersey Transit railroad tracks on the western side of Bound Brook and at the South Main Street railroad underpass that leads to Queens Bridge have been completed and are used to keep flood waters out of Bound Brook.
3. The new Talmadge Avenue Bridge that connects Bound Brook and Bridgewater, New Jersey is functionally complete. The replacement bridge was built to the height of the R2 Levee to prevent Middle Brook and Raritan River waters from entering Bound Brook from the west.
4. To improve water flow through Bound Brook, the former Conrail bridge over the Raritan River and its associated railroad embankment that were located east of Bound Brook were removed during 2007. The bridge and embankment, when they were in place, acted to block the river flow through the Bound Brook area. To build the main Bound Brook R2 levee, the bridge and embankment needed to be removed.

== Gallery ==
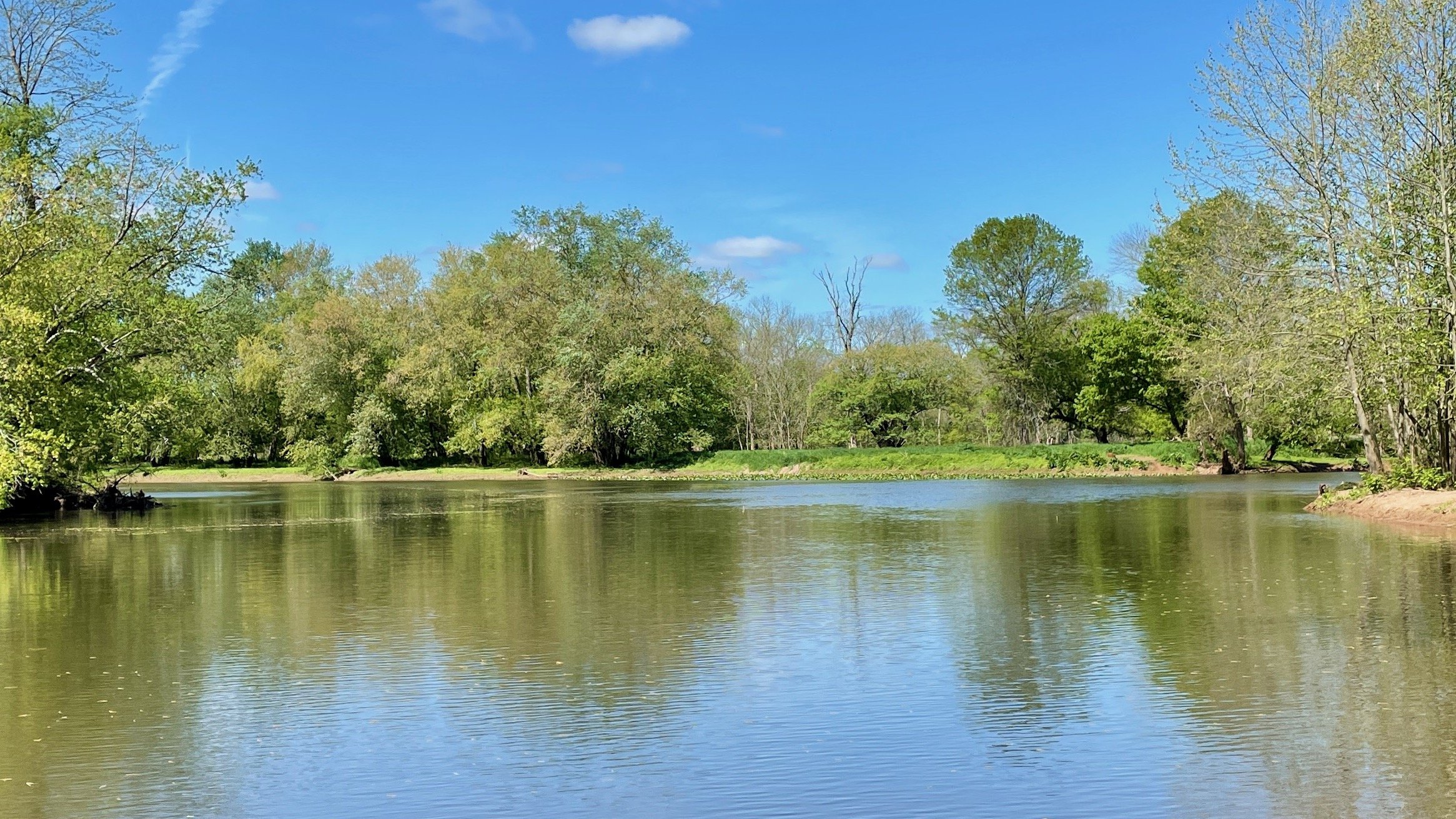
Confluence of the South Branch and the North Branch with the Raritan River in Branchburg

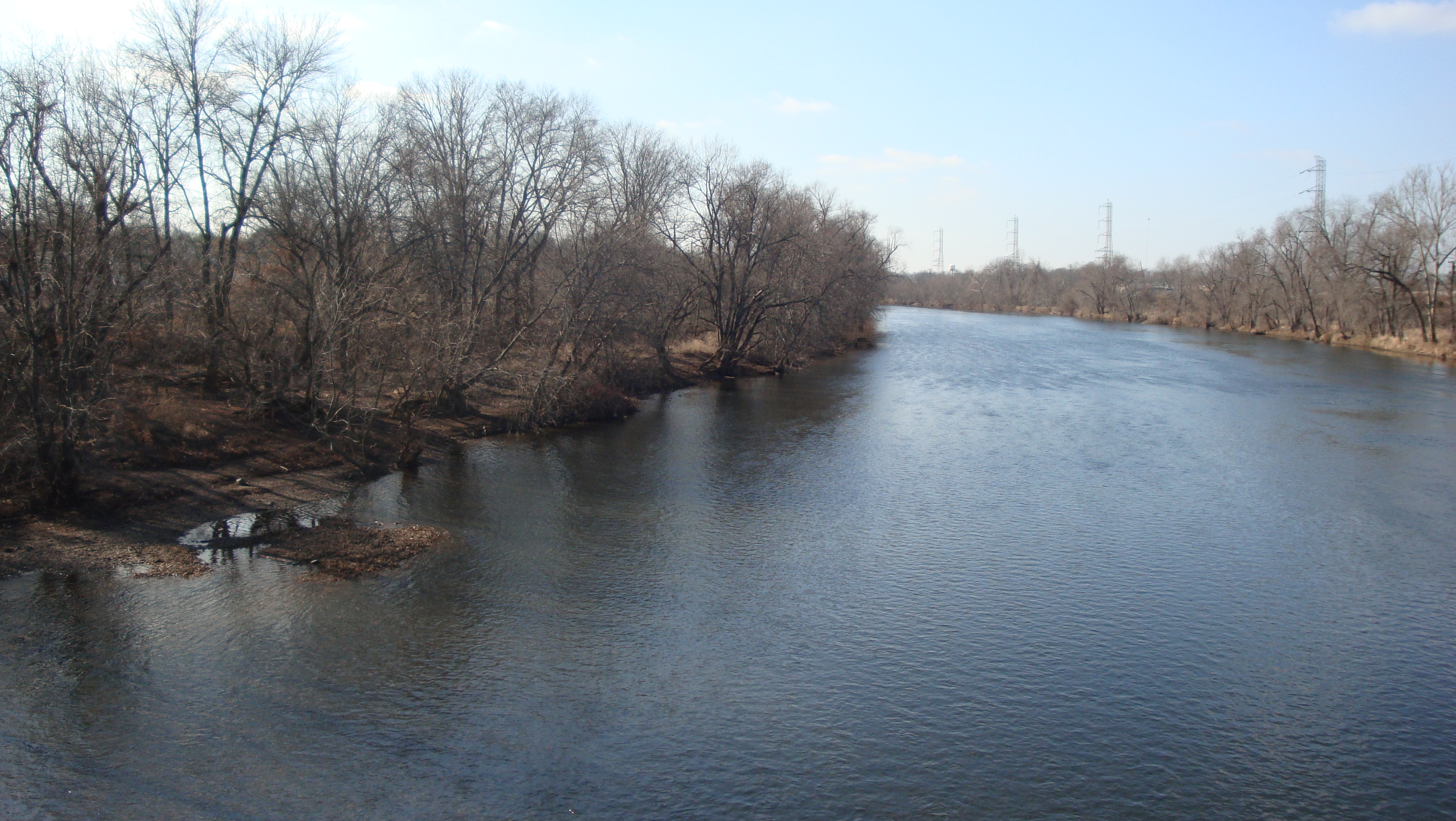
Raritan River viewed from Queens Bridge in Bound Brook

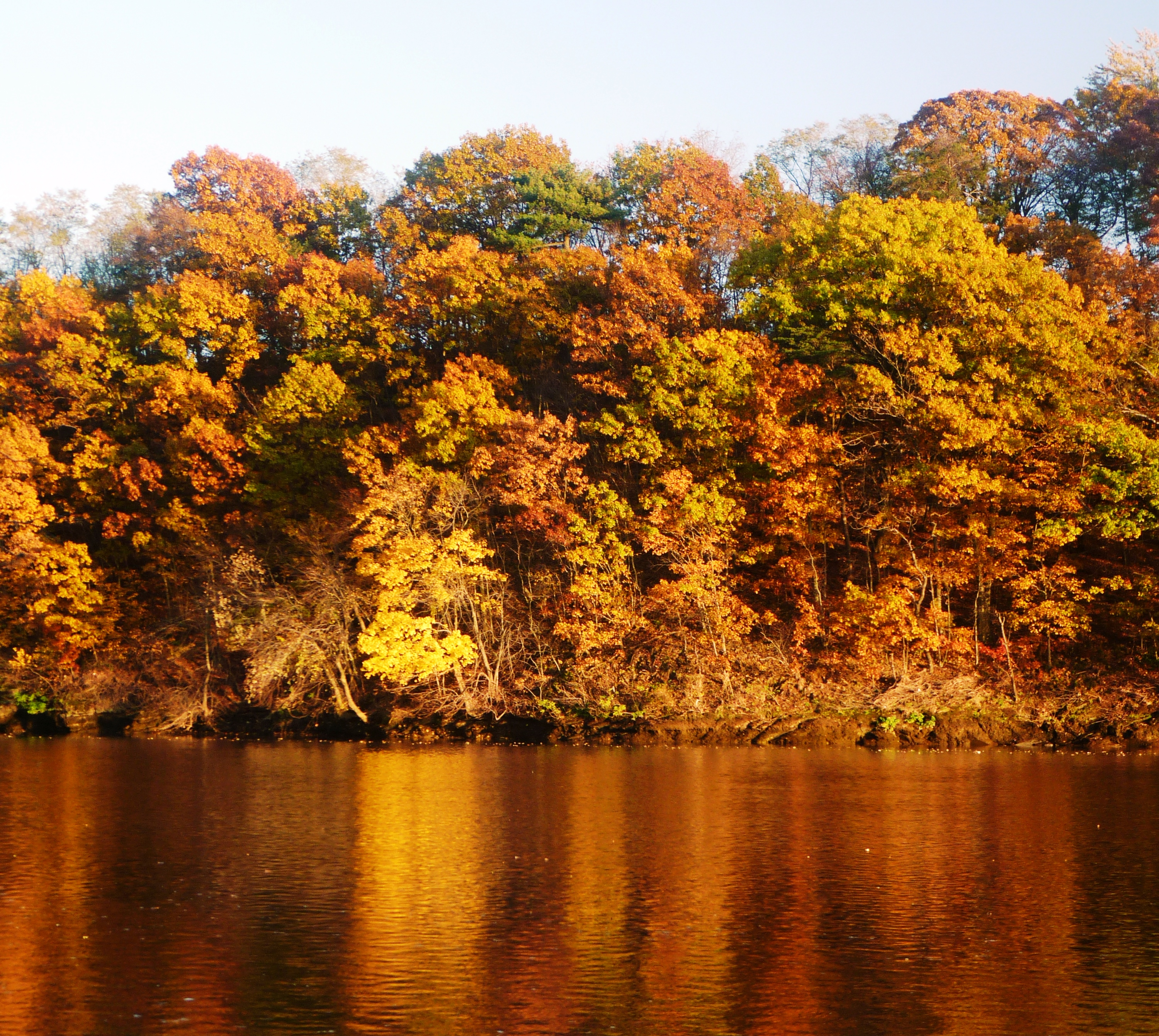
Raritan River at the Fall Line, as seen from Highland Park

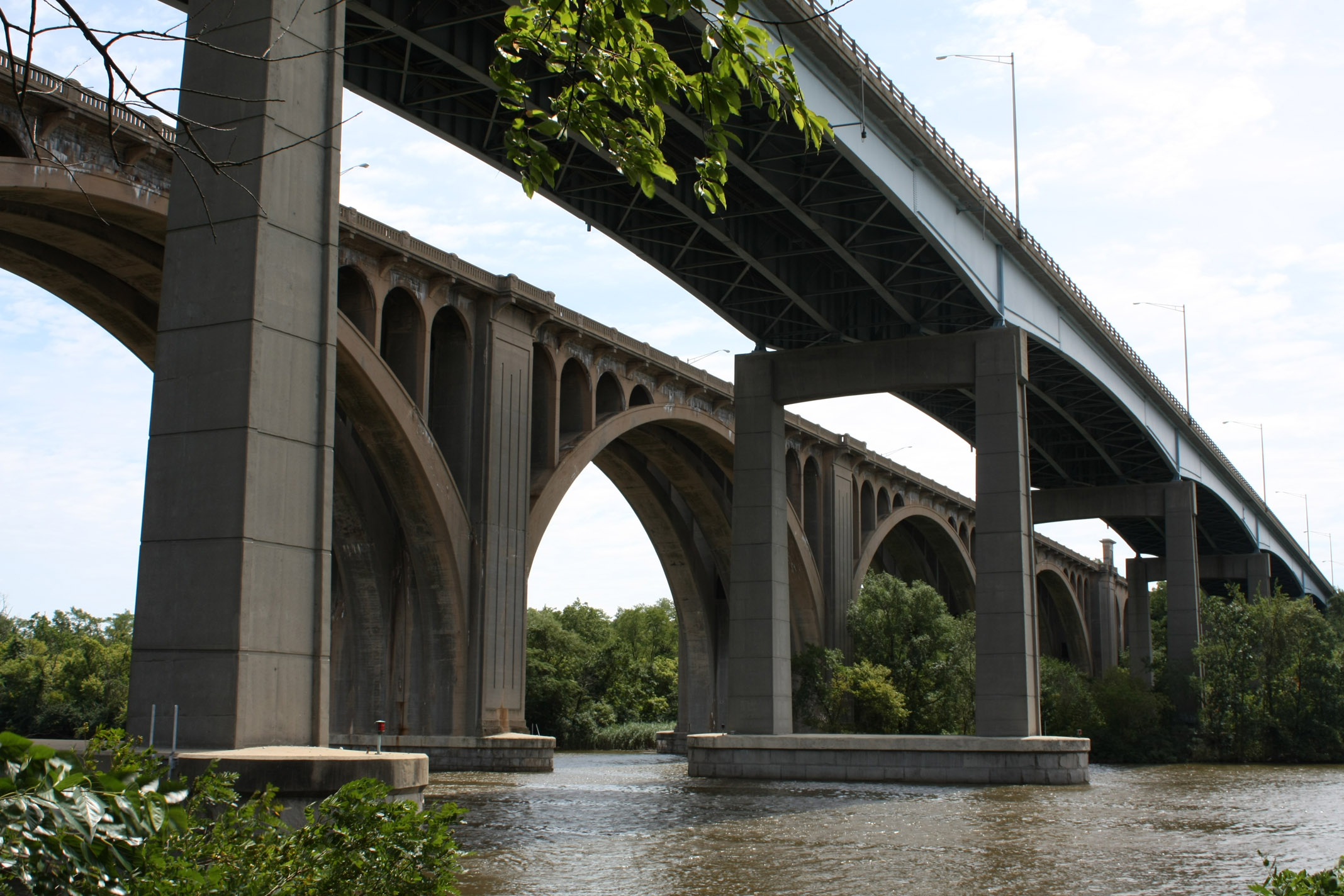
The Donald and Morris Goodkind Bridges over the Raritan River, connects New Brunswick with Edison

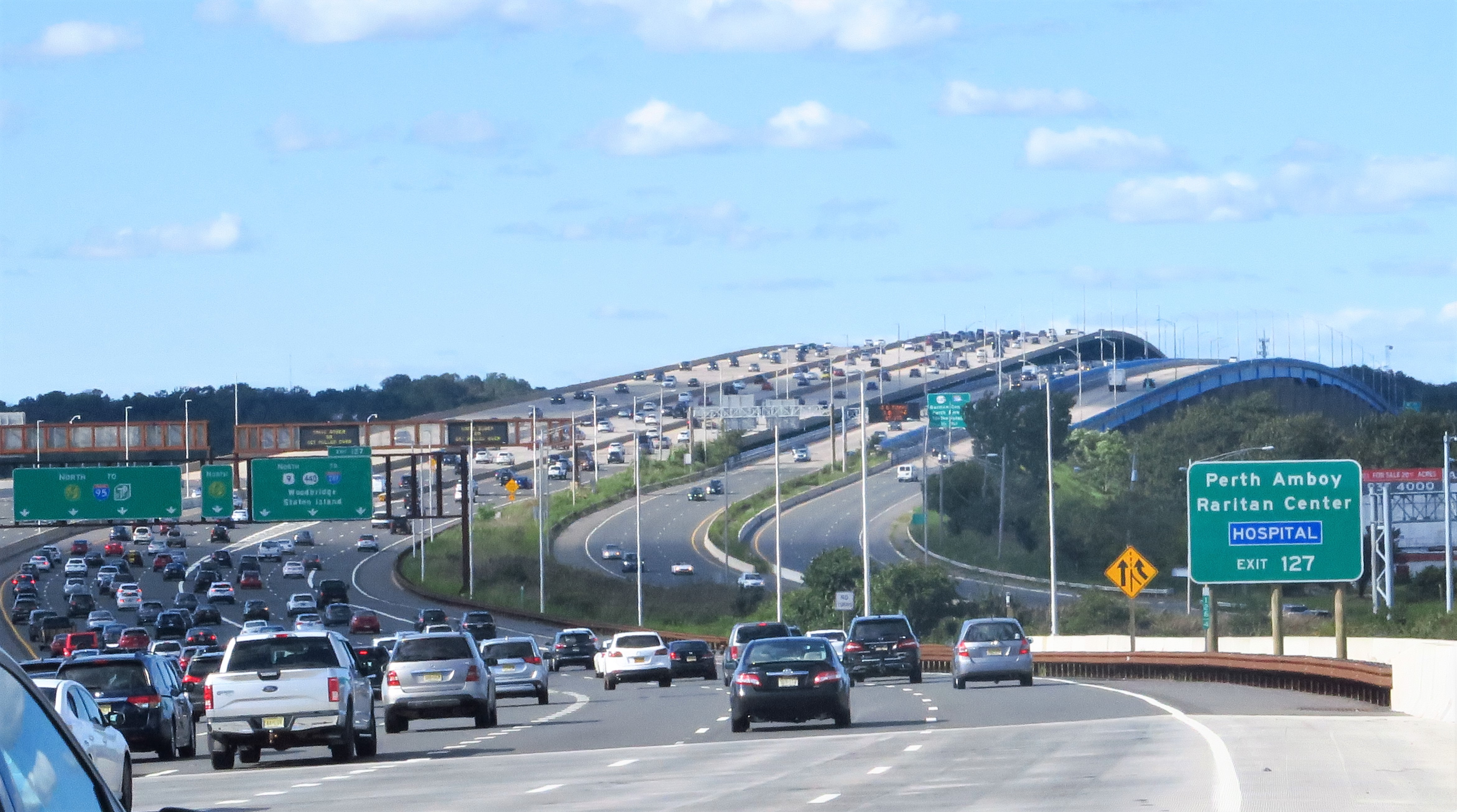
The Driscoll Bridge, with a total of 15 travel lanes and 6 shoulder lanes, is one of the world's widest and busiest motor vehicle bridges, as it crosses the Raritan River, connecting Sayreville and Woodbridge

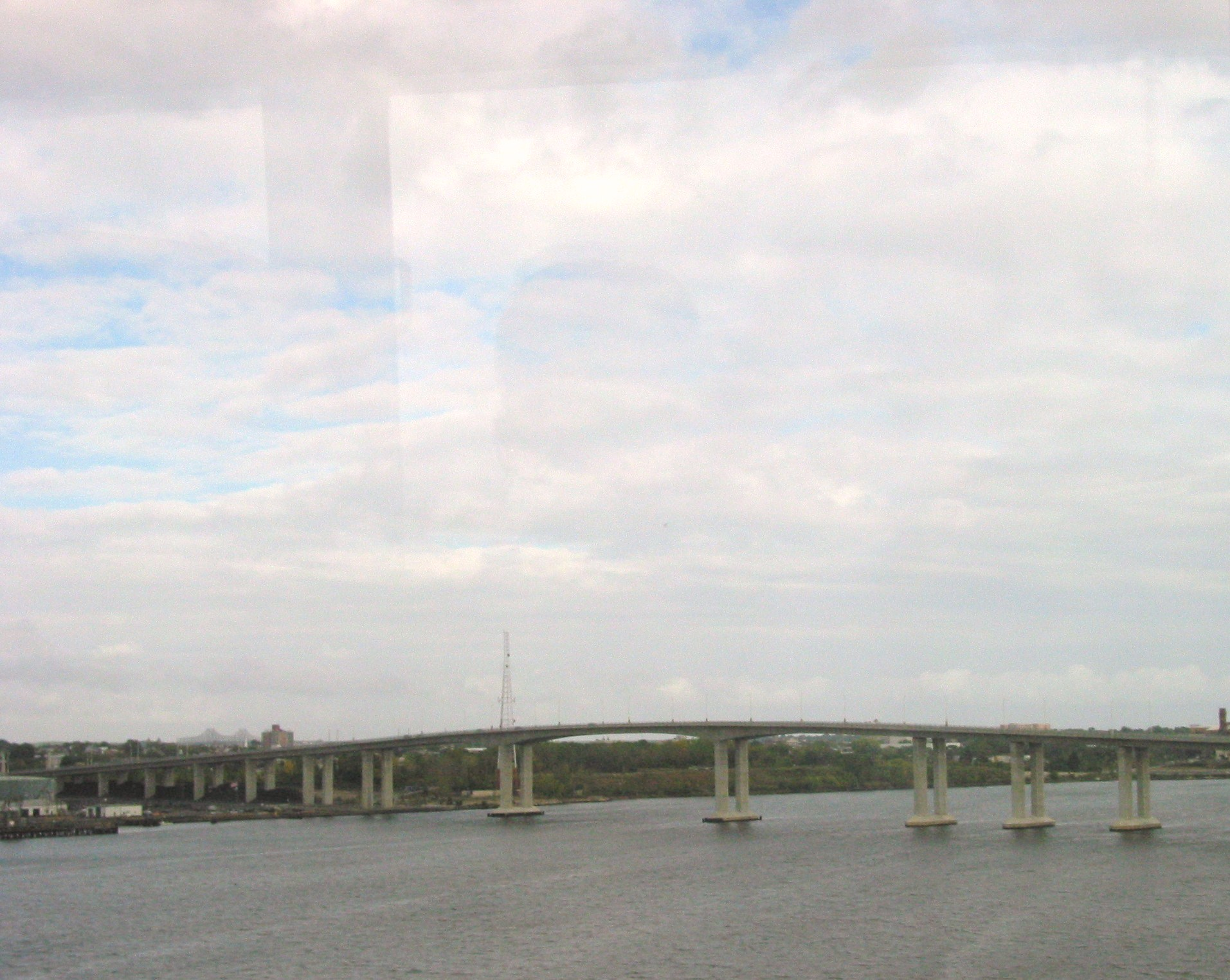
The Victory Bridge over the Raritan River, as seen from the Edison Bridge, it connects Sayreville with Perth Amboy
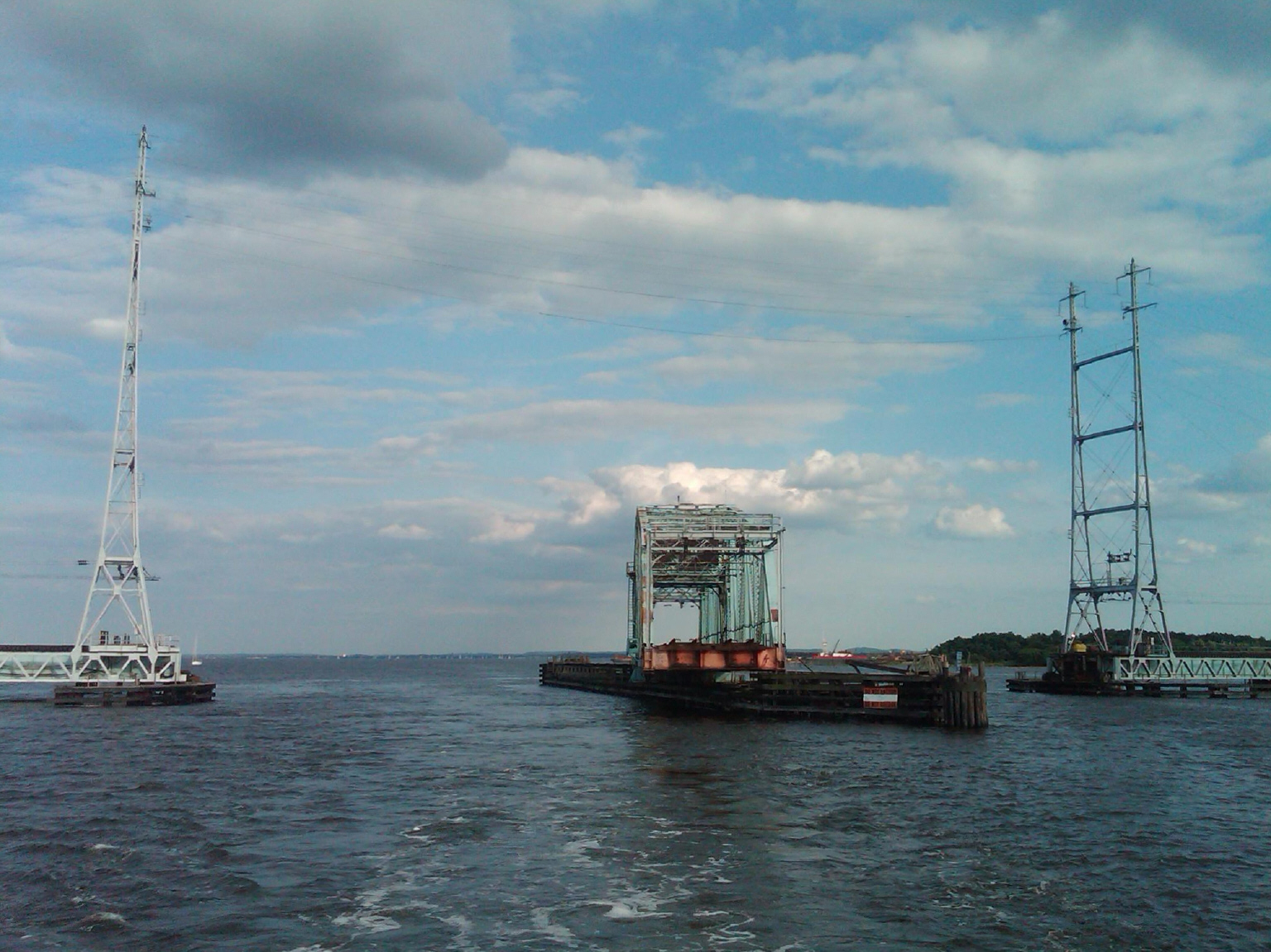
Raritan Bay Drawbridge in its open position, between Perth Amboy and South Amboy, right before the Raritan River drains out into the Raritan Bay

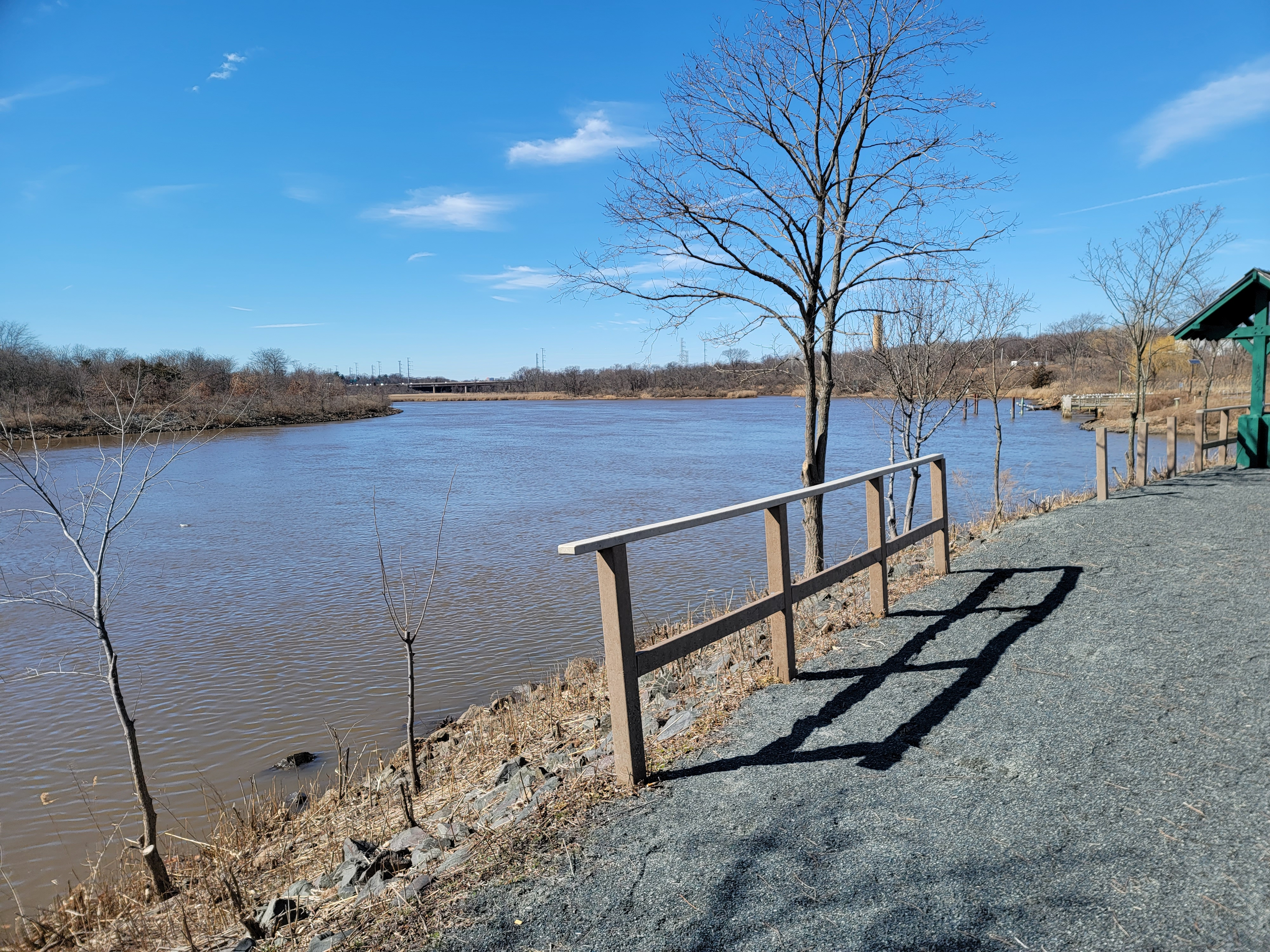
View of the Raritan River from the Edison Boat Basin

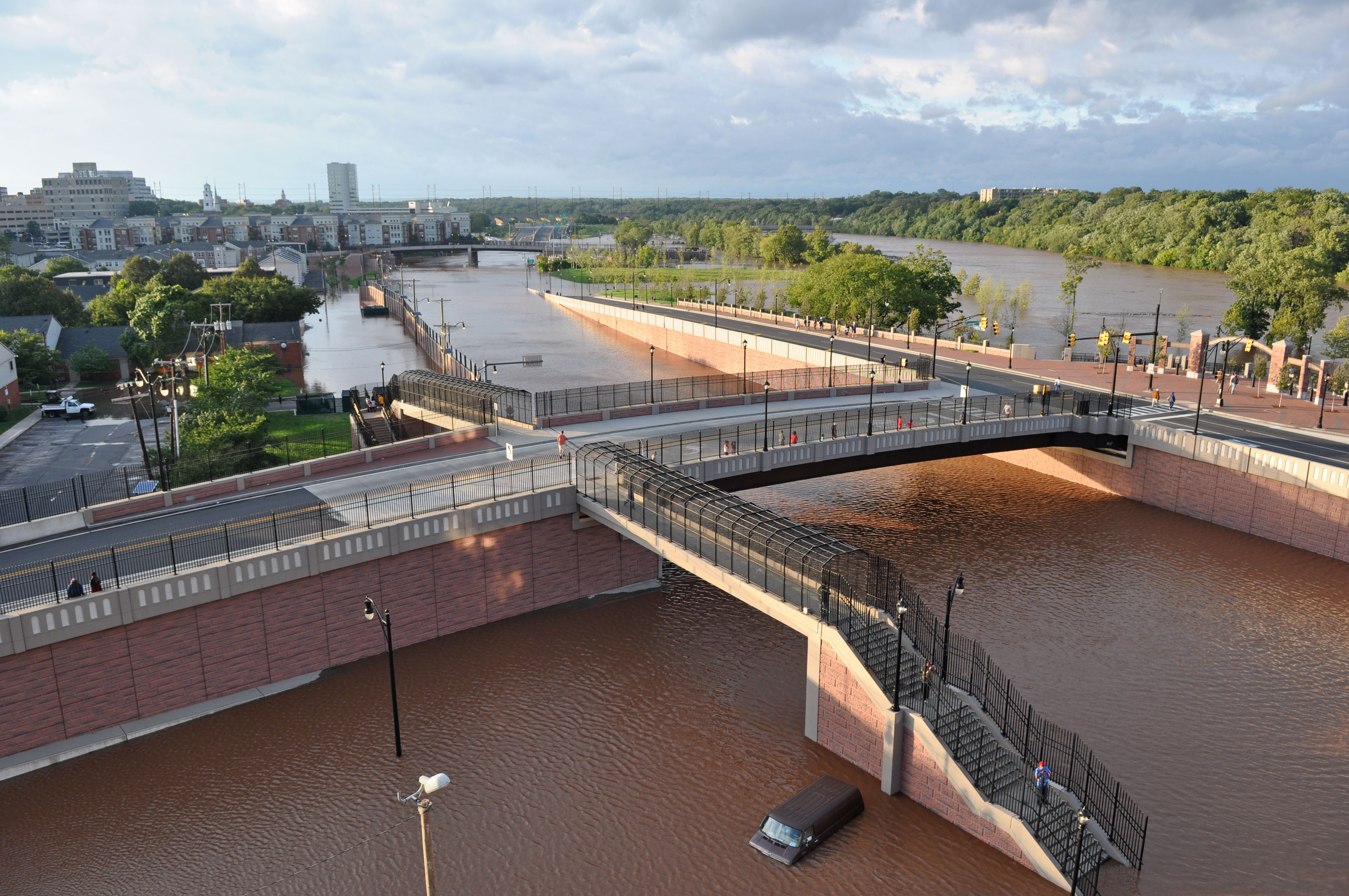
Flooding damage from Tropical Storm Irene in New Brunswick

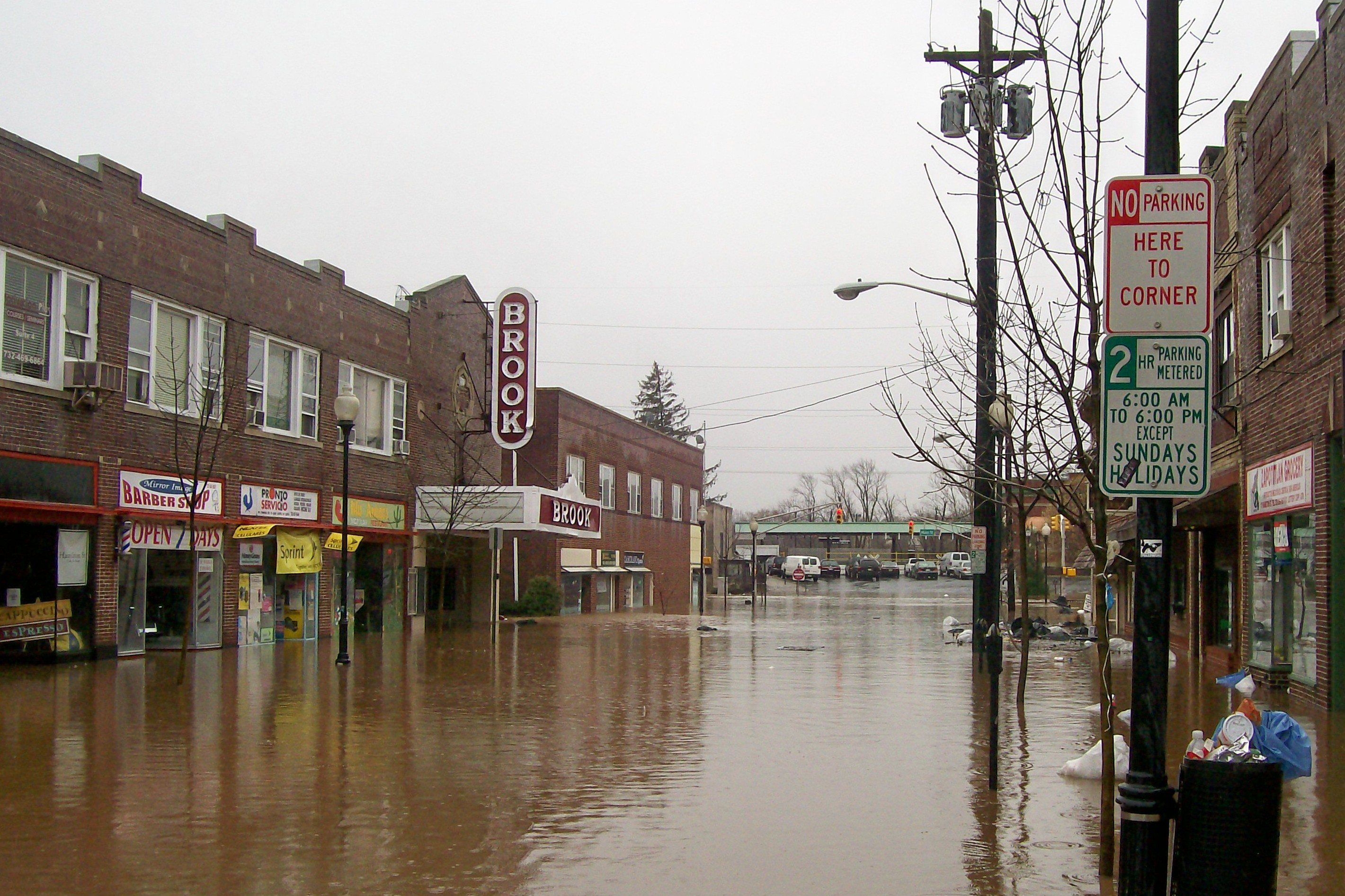
The Raritan River flooding Bound Brook, Spring Nor'easter, April 16, 2007

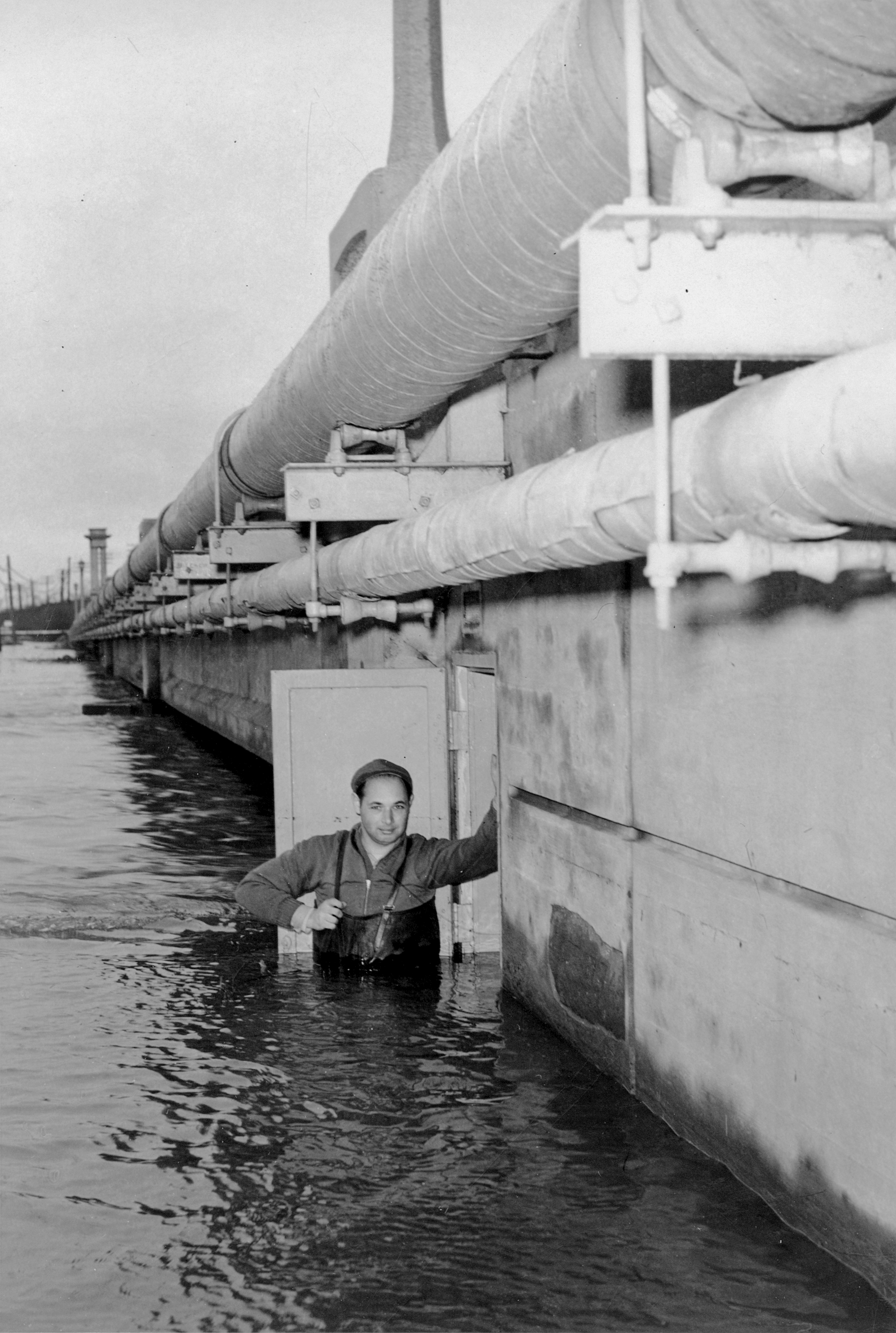
A gauge inspector and the Manville gage house built into Van Veghten's Bridge abutment during the flood of December 31, 1948

== Communities on the Raritan ==
(In alphabetical order with 2020 population)

- Bound Brook (11,988)
- Bridgewater (45,977)
- East Brunswick (49,715)
- Edison (107,588)
- Franklin Township (68,364)
- Highland Park (15,072)
- Hillsborough (43,276)
- Manville (10,953)
- Middlesex (14,636)
- New Brunswick (55,266)
- Perth Amboy (55,436)
- Piscataway (60,804)
- Raritan (7,835)
- Sayreville (45,345)
- Somerville (12,346)
- South Amboy (9,411)
- South Bound Brook (4,863)
- Woodbridge (103,639)

== Tributaries ==
The Raritan river is formed by the confluence of:

- North Branch Raritan River
- South Branch Raritan River

Its main tributaries are:

- Green Brook
- Lawrence Brook
- Millstone River
- South River

Others are:

- Arrarat Creek
- Crows Mill Creek
- Cuckels Brook
- Dukes Brook
- Garron Creek
- Manalapan Brook
- Middle Brook
- Mile Run
- Buell Brook
- Mill Brook
- Padilla Creek
- Peters Brook
- Pine Creek
- Randolph Brook
- Red Root Creek

== Lakes ==
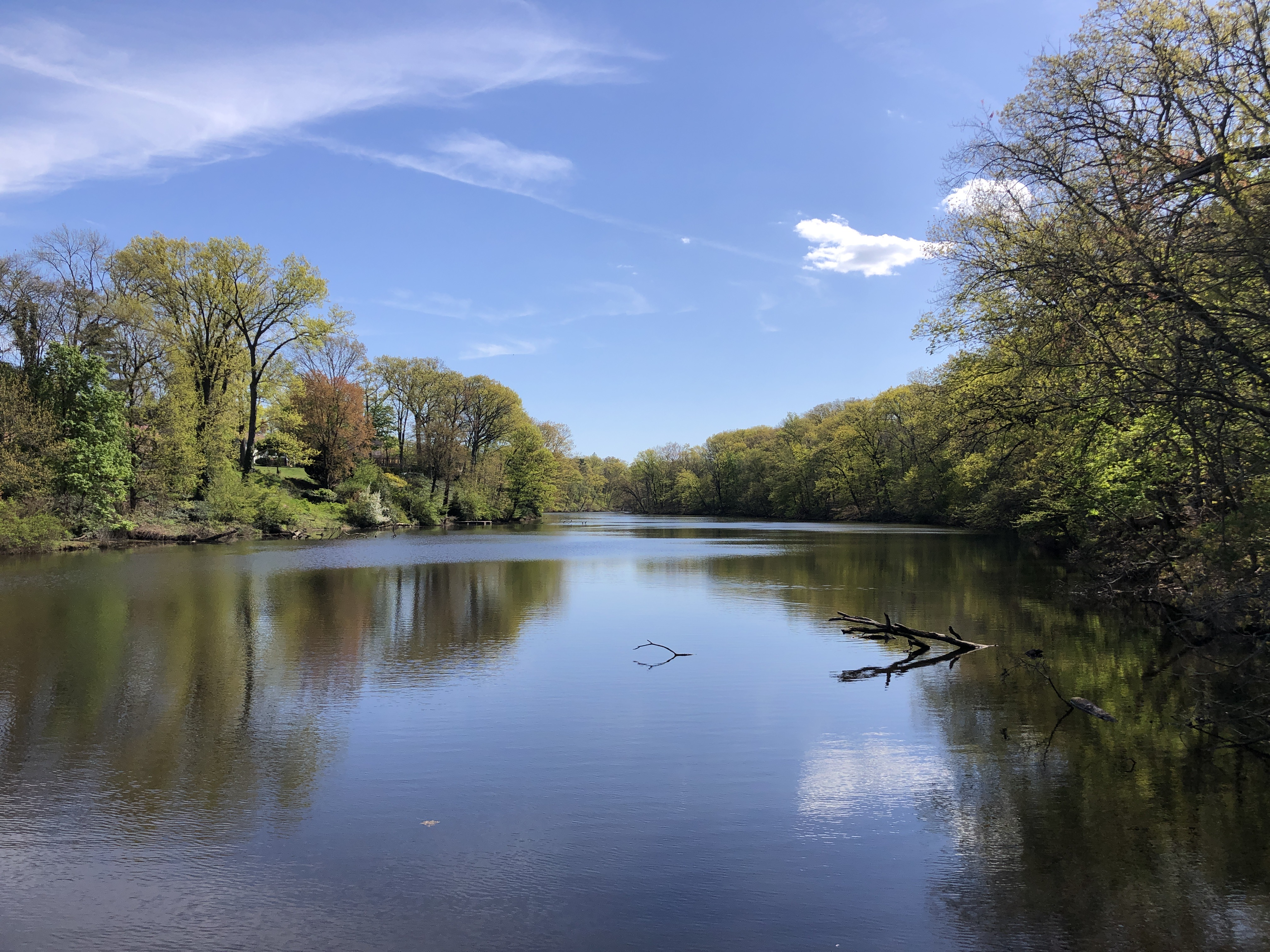
Westons Mill Pond, with East Brunswick on the left and Rutgers University on the right

Lakes that are located within the Raritan Basin include:

- Budd Lake
- Dismal Swamp
- Duhernal Lake
- Lake Manalapan
- Lake Carnegie
- Lake Surprise
- Lake Topanemus
- Manasquan Reservoir
- Round Valley Reservoir
- Spruce Run Reservoir
- Westons Mill Pond

== See also ==
- 2024 New Jersey drone sightings
- List of New Jersey rivers
- Geography of New York-New Jersey Harbor Estuary
- List of crossings of the Raritan River
- Raritan Bay
- Raritan Bayshore
- Sandy Hook Bay
- Delaware and Raritan Canal
- Delaware and Raritan Canal State Park
- Manasquan River
- Navesink River
- Passaic River
- Rahway River
- Shrewsbury River
- Arthur Kill
- Raritan River Project
- Hudson Canyon
