= Lake Topanemus =

Park in Freehold Township, New Jersey, United States

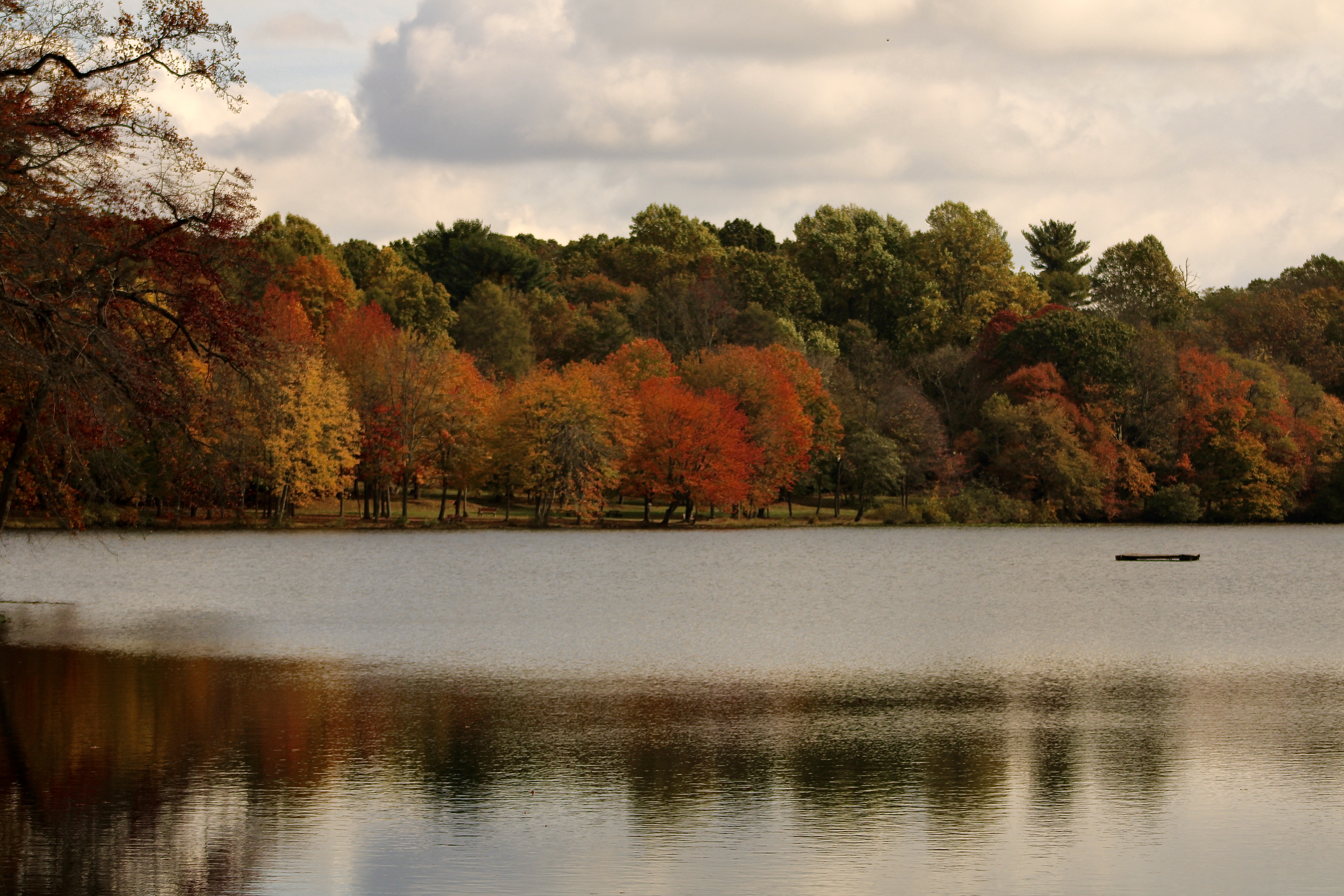
- Lake Topanemus during the autumn months
- Interactive map of Lake Topanemus
- Type: Suburban park
- Location: Monmouth County, New Jersey
- Coordinates: 40°16′35″N 74°16′54″W
- Area: 71 acres (29 ha)
- Operator: Freehold Borough and Freehold Township
- Status: Open all year

Lake Topanemus is a 71-acre (29 ha) suburban park located in Freehold Township, New Jersey, but owned and operated by Freehold Borough, New Jersey. The park's pond was originally the site of Forman's Mill in the 1800s.

The pond's attractions, include freshwater fishing, paddle boating, and canoeing. The park is also known for its picturesque nature trails, playgrounds, outdoor calisthenics, and open fields. The lake is located on the course of McGellairds Brook, which drains to Matchaponix Brook.

== Nomenclature ==
The name "Topanemus" can be found in other nomenclature in the general region. As immigrants from Scotland were emigrating to western Monmouth County during the 1600s, they encountered the indigenous Lenape people that had already lived there. The Lenape referred to the region where they dwelled, in modern-day western Monmouth County, as Topanemus. By the 1690s, Scottish Presbyterians and Quakers had begun to establish themselves in the Topanemus region. Located in neighboring Marlboro Township, New Jersey, the Topanemus Cemetery was the site of a Quaker Meeting House and cemetery (before European colonization, was the former Indian village and burial ground), it dates back to 1692.

Old Tennent Church in neighboring Manalapan Township, New Jersey was emblematic of the immense Scottish influence during the early Colonial period. The Topanemus namesake continues to live on, through street signs, historical place-markers, and park names. In neighboring Millstone Township, New Jersey is where YMCA's Camp Topanemus is located, often mistaken for Lake Topanemus and/or for having a connection.

== Park information ==
The park features nature trails, benches, picnic tables, a playground, open fields, and a beautiful array of native plants, trees, and shrubs. During the appropriate season, canoes, paddleboats, kayaks, and rowboats can be seen used by residents on the lake. During the winter season, some residents opt for ice-skating. Every year, Freehold Borough, New Jersey hosts Olde Freehold Day in the park. It is the borough's annual seasonal celebration, with a wide assortment of family friendly activities, such as: paddle boats, food trucks, vendors, kids attractions, and live music venues, along with some reenactments of life in the general area during the colonial period.

== Gallery ==
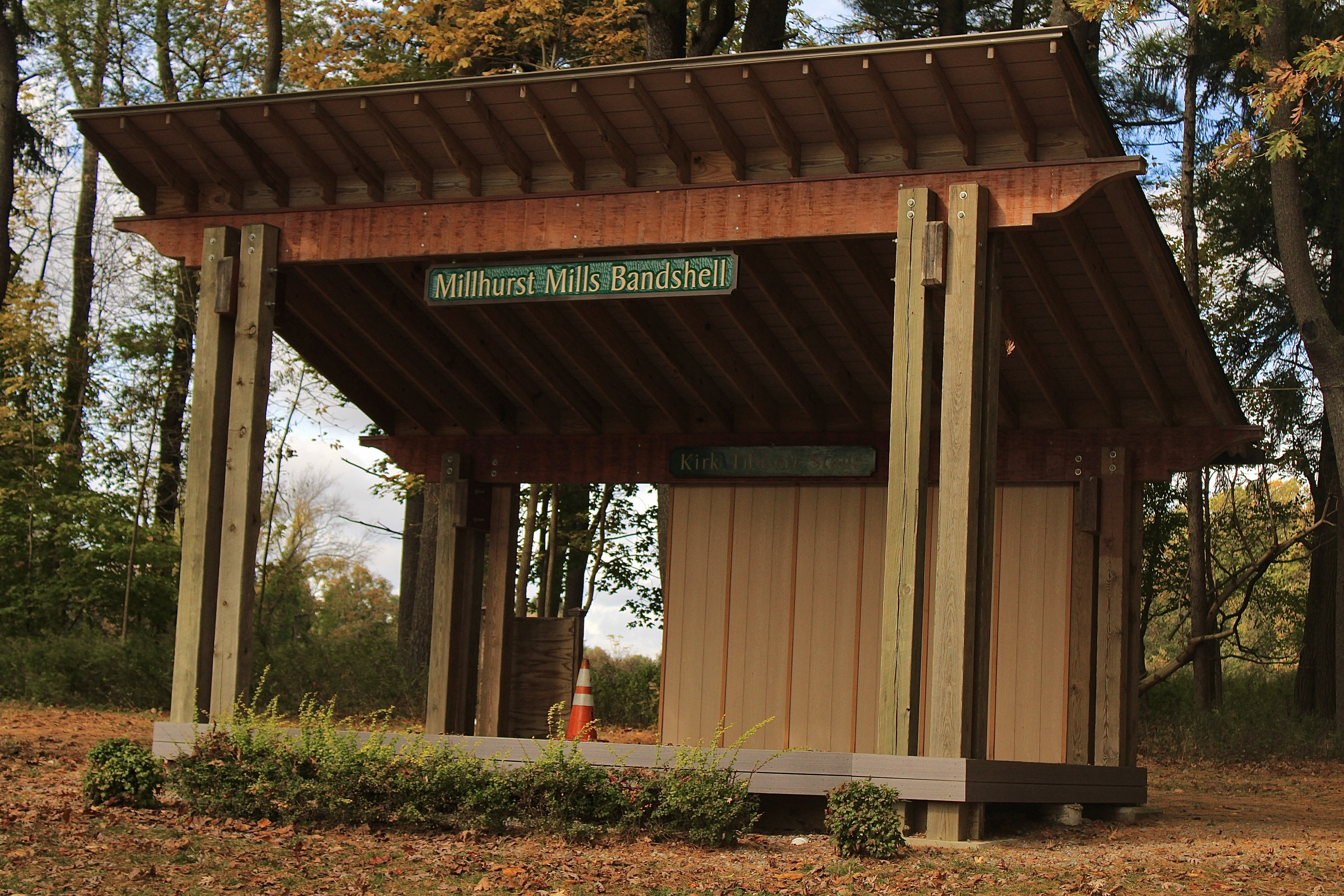
Kirk Tibbet Stage, constructed at Millhurst Mills

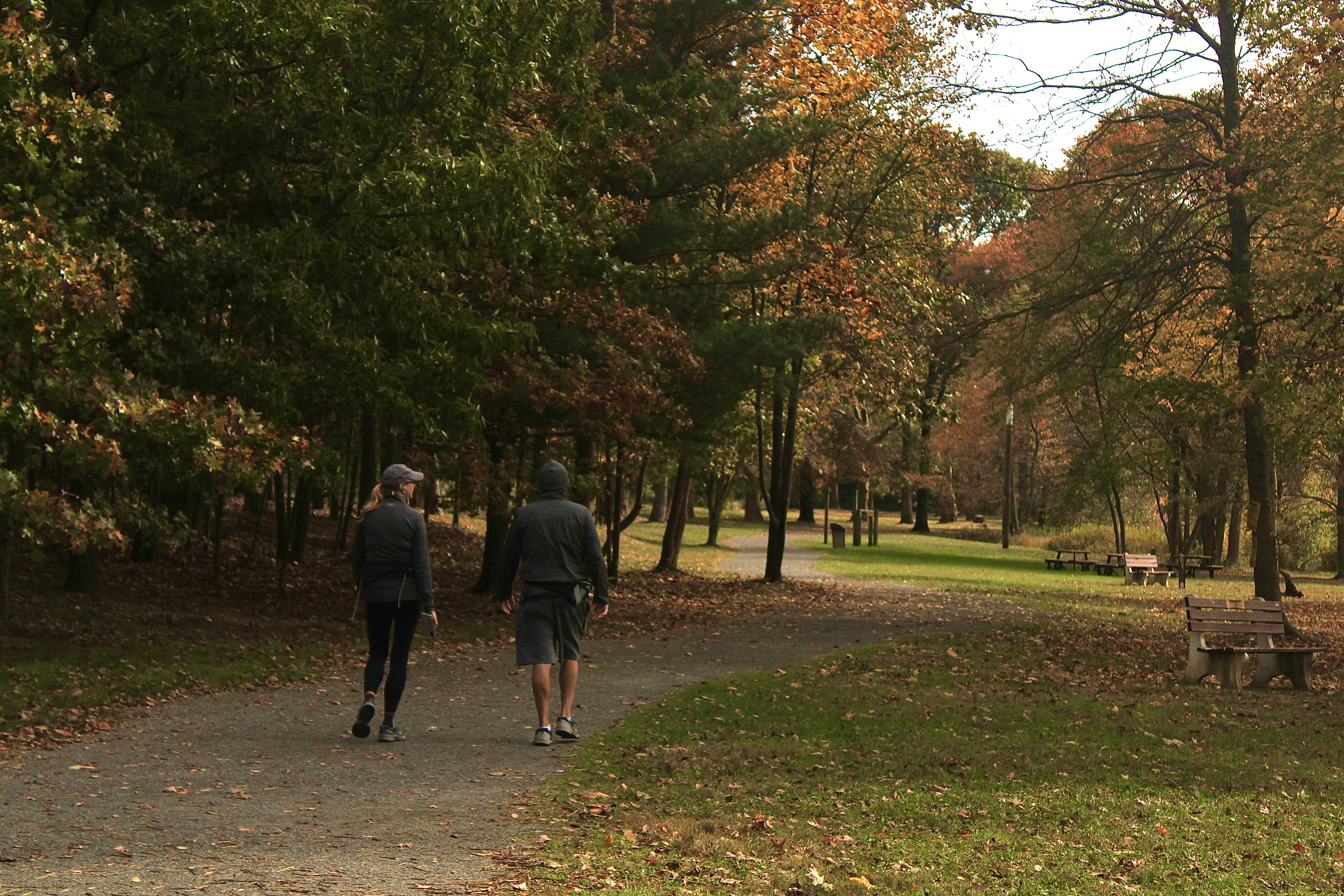
Park visitors

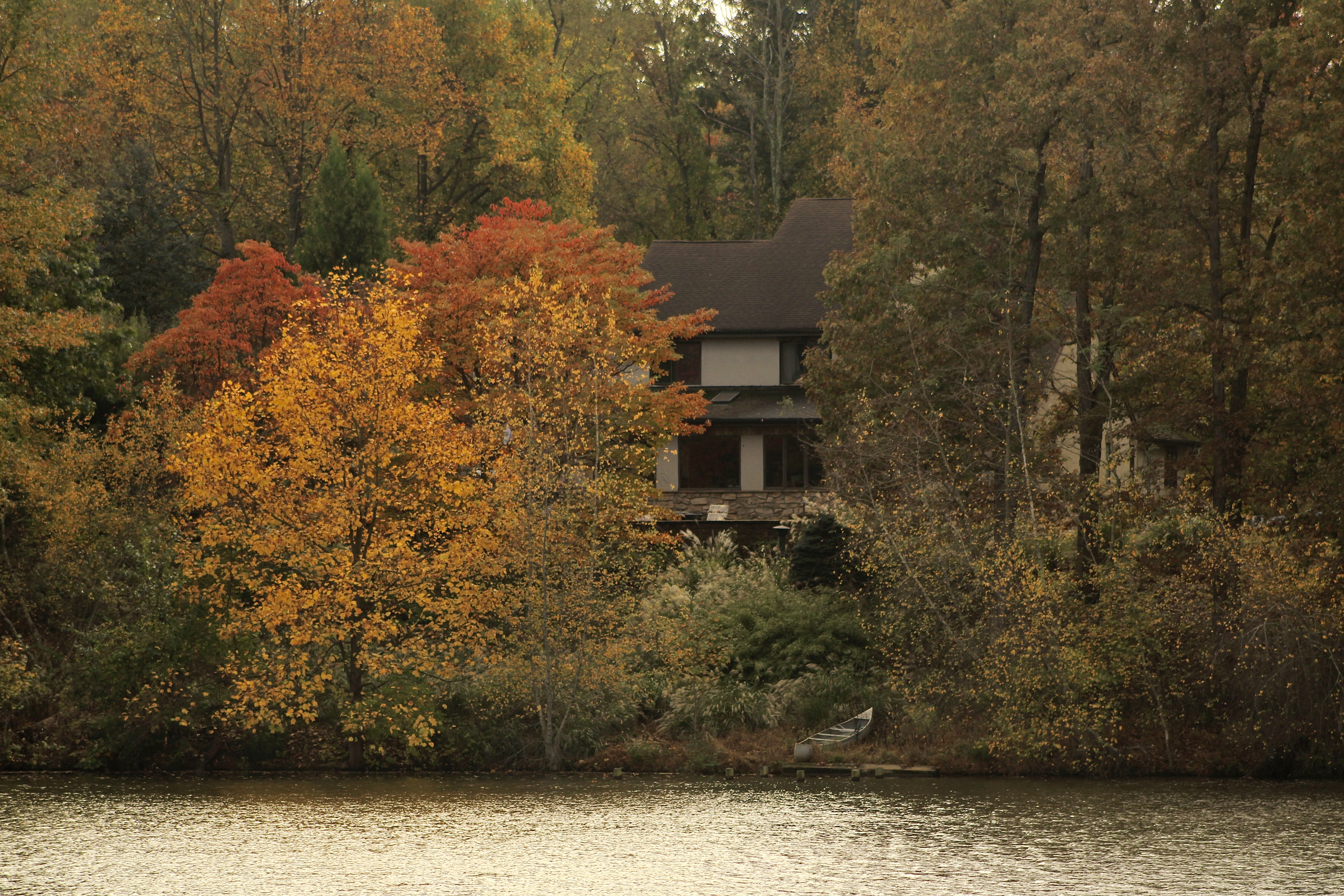
Residence located on the lake

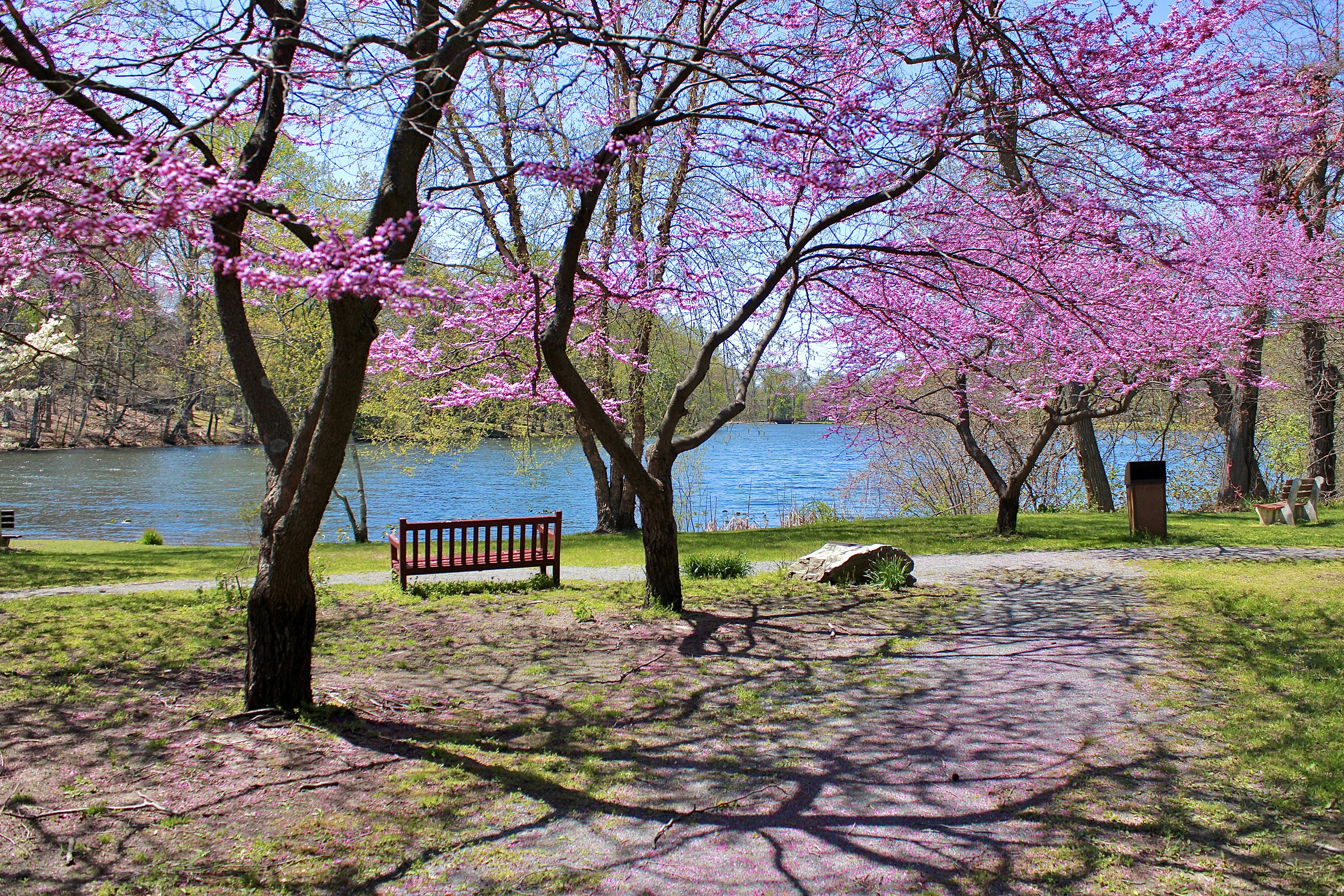
Cherry blossoms
