= Victory Bridge (New Jersey) =

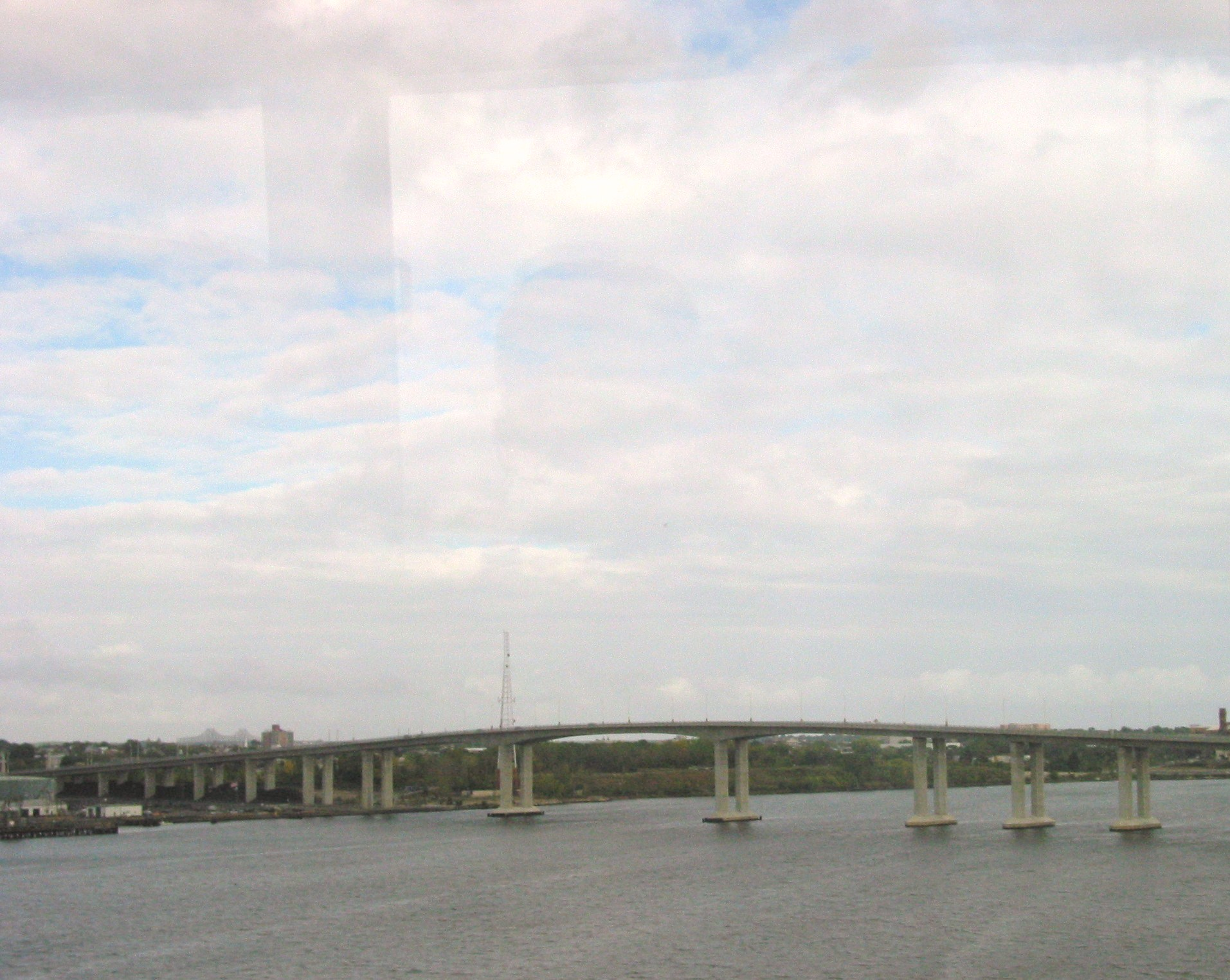
- The Victory Bridge as seen from the Edison Bridge
- Coordinates: 40°30′28″N 74°17′31″W
- Carries: 4 lanes of Route 35, bikes/pedestrians
- Crosses: Raritan River
- Locale: Sayreville, New Jersey and Perth Amboy, New Jersey
- Maintained by: NJDOT

Characteristics
- Design: segmental precast concrete

History
- Opened: June 24, 1926 (original bridge, demolished 2004); June 8, 2004 (new bridge); September 2, 2005 (northbound bridge)

Location
- Interactive map of Victory Bridge

The Victory Bridge is a highway bridge in the U.S. state of New Jersey that carries Route 35 over the Raritan River, connecting the Middlesex County communities of Perth Amboy on the north and Sayreville to the south. The bridge is operated and maintained by the New Jersey Department of Transportation (NJDOT).

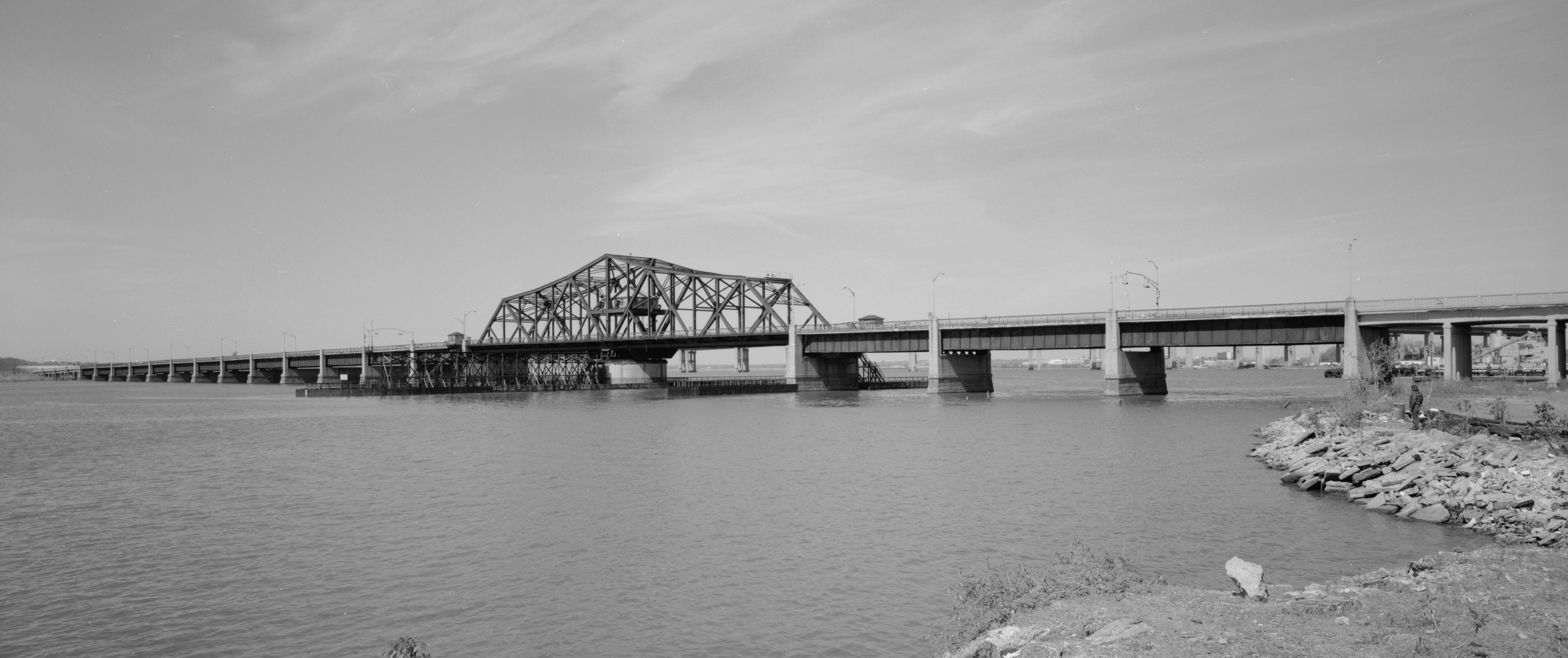
Photo of the original Victory Bridge

The new bridge replaced the original Victory Bridge, a swing bridge dedicated to the U.S. troops who served in World War I and opened in June 1926 at ceremonies attended by 200,000 people. The original bridge was in turn a replacement for the County Bridge, a swing bridge designed for pedestrians and carriages. At the time of its construction, the original 360-foot Victory bridge (110 m) was the longest such structure in New Jersey.

The new bridge consists of twin structures (northbound and southbound), each carrying two 12-foot travel lanes (3.7 m), a 10-foot bike lane/outside shoulder (3.0 m) and a 3-foot shoulder (0.91 m). The southbound bridge also has a 6-foot-wide sidewalk (1.8 m). The bridge was designed with a record-setting 134-meter main span (440 ft)—the longest precast cantilever segmental construction in the United States. To reduce the construction time, the NJDOT selected the segmental precast concrete construction method for both the superstructure and substructure. The department estimated that by using this type of approach, it would reduce the duration of construction by at least one year and save millions of dollars in life cycle costs.

Construction on the first half of the new high level fixed bridge across the Raritan River was completed on June 8, 2004. The old Victory Bridge was then demolished and the new northbound parallel bridge was constructed in its place. The new, northbound section of the bridge opened to traffic on September 2, 2005. The new high-level fixed bridge eliminates traffic delays caused when opening the former low-level swing bridge to allow boat traffic to pass through.

At each end of the new bridge are concrete stanchions, containing the original bridge's dedication plaque on one side and the new one's on the other. On the bridge's light poles, a feature arriving with the new bridge, are plaques honoring various battles in which American troops participated.

In the decade through 2014, nearly 80 individuals have attempted suicide by jumping off the new Victory Bridge, resulting in 22 deaths. In February 2011, The City of Perth Amboy sent a resolution to Governor Chris Christie and the New Jersey General Assembly requesting the addition of a fence along the Victory Bridge. Currently there are no phones along the bridge route but there are suicide hotline numbers listed along the bridge's route. Following the temporary closure of the pedestrian sidewalks and bike lanes in October 2014, NJDOT officials installed five-foot-high (1.5 m) fences along both sides to prevent further suicides.

== See also ==
- List of bridges documented by the Historic American Engineering Record in New Jersey
- List of crossings of the Raritan River
