= List of rivers of New Jersey =

This is a list of streams and rivers of the U.S. state of New Jersey.

The list of New Jersey rivers includes streams formally designated as rivers, as well as smaller streams such as branches, creeks, drains, forks, licks, runs, etc. found throughout the state. Among the major rivers in New Jersey are the Manasquan, Maurice, Mullica, Passaic, Rahway, Raritan, Musconetcong, Hudson and Delaware rivers. Throughout history, the Delaware and Raritan rivers have played a crucial role in transporting goods and people from the Atlantic Ocean into the inland areas, and they were once connected by the Delaware and Raritan Canal. Today, these rivers, along with the streams that feed them, provide sport and recreation for many people.

== By drainage basin ==
=== Hudson River Basin ===
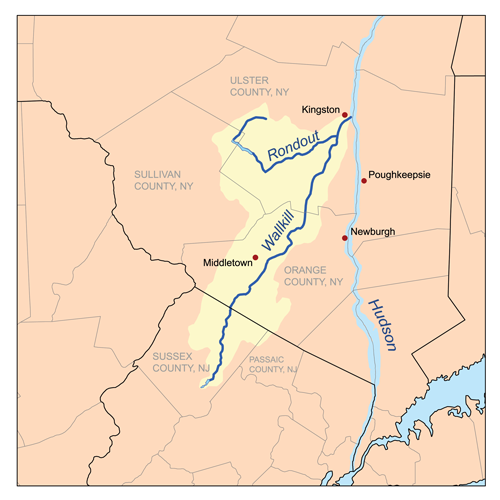
Rondout/Wallkill Drainage Basin

- North River (Lower Hudson)
  - Hudson River
    - Sparkill Creek
    - Rondout Creek (NY)
      - Wallkill River
        - Pochuck Creek
          - Black Creek
          - Wawayanda Creek
        - Papakating Creek
          - Clove Brook
          - Neepaulakating Creek
          - West Branch Papakating Creek

=== Newark Bay ===
- Kill Van Kull (tidal strait)
- Hackensack River
  - Penhorn Creek
  - Sawmill Creek
  - Berrys Creek
  - Mill Creek
  - Cromakill Creek
  - Bellmans Creek
  - Losen Slofe
  - Overpeck Creek
  - Pascack Brook
    - Bear Brook
    - Musquapsink Brook
  - Dwars Kill

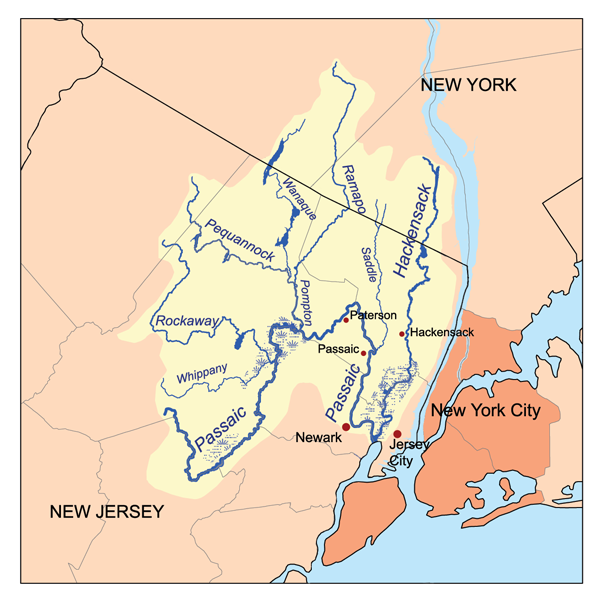
Passaic/Hackensack Drainage Basin

- Passaic River
  - First River (a.k.a. Mill Brook tributary)
  - Second River
    - Toney's Brook
    - Nishuane Brook
    - Parrow Brook
    - Wigwam Brook
  - Third River
    - Yantacaw Brook
  - Saddle River
    - Ho-Ho-Kus Brook
  - Fleischer Brook
  - Little Diamond Brook
  - Diamond Brook
  - Stevenson Brook
  - Goffle Brook
    - Deep Voll Brook
  - Molly Ann Brook
    - Squaw Brook
  - Slippery Rock Brook
  - Peckman River
  - Deepavaal Brook
  - Pompton River
    - Ramapo River
      - Mahwah River
    - Pequannock River
      - Wanaque River
  - Rockaway River
    - Den Brook
    - Whippany River
  - Foulerton's Brook
  - Spring Garden Brook
  - Slough Brook
  - Canoe Brook
  - Salt Brook
  - Cory's Brook
  - Dead River
  - Black Brook
  - Great Brook
    - Primrose Brook
    - Loantaka Brook
  - Penns Brook
  - Indian Grove Brook
  - Naakpunkt Brook

=== Raritan River Basin ===
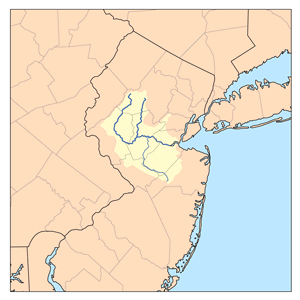
Raritan Drainage Basin

- Raritan River
  - Bound Brook
    - Ambrose Brook
    - Green Brook
      - Blue Brook
      - Bonygutt Brook
      - Stony Brook
        - Crab Brook
  - Cedar Brook
  - Crows Mill Creek
  - Cuckholds Brook
  - Dukes Brook
  - Garron Creek
  - Lawrence Brook
    - Beaverdam Brook
    - Great Ditch
    - Ireland Brook
    - Oakeys Brook
      - Cow Yard Brook
    - Sawmill Brook
    - Sucker Brook
    - Terhune Run
    - Unnamed Brook in Rutgers Gardens, unofficially named Doc Brook
    - Unnamed Brook in Rutgers' Helyar Woods
  - Middle Brook
  - Mile Run
  - Mill Brook
  - Millstone River
    - Beden Brook
      - Cherry Run
      - Pike Run
        - Pine Tree Run
        - Back Brook
          - Branch Back Brook
        - Cruser Brook
          - Roaring Brook
      - Rock Brook
        - Cat Tail Brook
    - Bear Brook
    - Cranbury Brook
      - Cedar Brook
    - Devils Brook
      - Shallow Brook
    - Harrys Brook
    - Heathcote Brook
      - Carters Brook
      - Heathcote Brook Branch
    - Indian Run Brook
    - Little Bear Brook
    - Millstone Brook
    - Peace Brook
    - Rocky Brook
      - Timber Run
    - Royce Brook
    - Simonson Brook
    - Six Mile Run
      - Cross Brook
      - Middlebush Brook
      - Nine Mile Run
      - Steep Hill Brook
    - Stony Brook
      - Baldwins Creek
      - Duck Pond Run
      - Honey Branch
      - Lewis Brook
      - Peters Brook (Stony Brook tributary)
      - Stony Brook Branch
      - Woodsville Brook
    - Ten Mile Run
    - Van Horn Brook
  - North Branch Raritan River
    - Black River
    - Burnett Brook
    - Chambers Brook
    - Chamber's Brook
    - Clucas Brook
    - India Brook
    - Lamington River
      - Bamboo Brook
      - Cold Brook
      - Hollow Brook
      - Rockaway Creek
      - Tanners Brook
    - Larger Brook
    - McVickers Brook
    - Middle Brook (Bedminster)
    - Mine Brook
    - Moggy Brook
    - Peapack Brook
    - Penns Brook
    - Stewart Brook
  - Padilla Creek
  - Prescott Canal)
  - Prescott Brook
  - Prescott Creek
  - Red Root Creek
  - South Branch Raritan River
    - Allerton Creek
    - Assicong Creek
    - Beaver Brook
    - Bushkill Brook
    - Campbell's Brook
    - Capoolong Creek
    - Cramers Creek
    - Drakes Brook
    - Electric Brook
    - Holland Brook
    - Little Brook
    - Minneaconing Creek
    - Neshanic River
      - First Neshanic River
      - Second Neshanic River
      - Third Neshanic River
    - Pleasant Run
    - Spruce Run
      - Mulhockaway Creek
    - Stony Brook (Washington Township - Morris County)
    - Sidney Brook
    - Turkey Brook
  - South River
    - Deep Run
    - Duck Creek
    - Manalapan Brook
    - Matchaponix Brook
      - Barclay Brook
      - McGellairds Brook
      - Pine Brook
      - Weamaconk Creek
        - Wemrock Brook
    - Pond Creek
    - Tennents Brook

=== Atlantic Coast ===
- Arthur Kill (tidal strait)
  - Elizabeth River
  - Morses Creek
  - Piles Creek
  - Rahway River
    - Marshes Creek
    - South Branch
    - Robinsons Branch
      - Pumpkin Patch Brook
  - Smith Creek
  - Woodbridge River (Also known as Woodbridge Creek)
    - Wedgewood Brook
    - Heards Brook
- Navesink River
  - Swimming River
- Shrewsbury River
- Shark River
- Manasquan River
  - Yellow Brook
- Metedeconk River
  - North Branch Metedeconk River
  - South Branch Metedeconk River
- Toms River
  - Union Branch
    - Ridgeway Branch
- Cedar Creek
- Forked River
- Oyster Creek
- Westecunk Creek
- Mullica River
  - Ballanger Creek
  - Big Graveling Creek (tidal channel)
  - Nacote Creek
  - Bass River
  - Wading River
    - Oswego River
    - Tulpehocken Creek
    - West Branch Wading River
  - Turtle Creek
  - Landing Creek
  - Batsto River
  - Nescochague Creek
  - Mechescatauxin Branch
    - Albertson Brook
      - Blue Anchor Brook
      - Pump Branch
    - Great Swamp Brook
- Abescon Creek
- Great Egg Harbor River
  - Patcong Creek
  - Tuckahoe River
    - Cedar Swamp Creek
  - English Creek
  - Stephen Creek
  - South River
  - Hospitality Branch
  - Kettle Creek

=== Delaware Bay ===
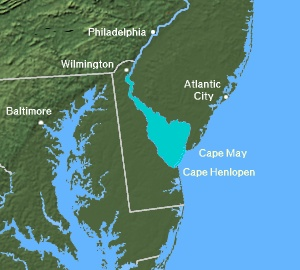
Delaware Bay

- Dennis Creek
  - Roaring Ditch
  - Sluice Creek
- East Creek
- West Creek
- Maurice River
  - Muskee Creek
  - Manumuskin River
  - Manantico Creek
  - Muddy Run
  - Scotland Run
  - Still Run
    - Little Ease Run
- Dividing Creek
- Fishing Creek
  - Fulling Mill Stream
- Oranoaken Creek
- Nantuxent Creek
- Cedar Creek
- Back Creek
  - Ogden Creek
  - Abbots Creek
- Cohansey River
- Stow Creek
- Mad Horse Creek
- Hope Creek
- Alloway Creek
- Salem River
  - Fenwick Creek
  - Mannington Creek
  - Game Creek

==== Delaware River Basin ====
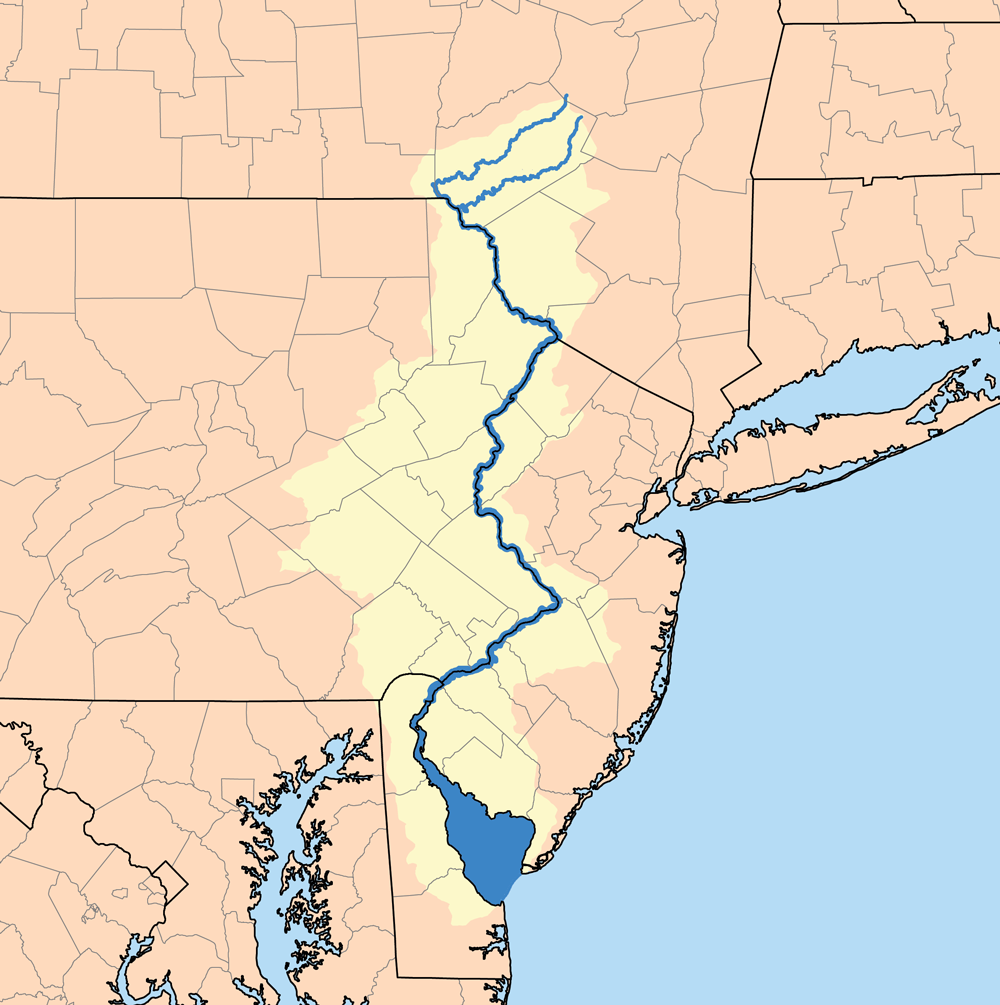
Delaware Drainage Basin

- Delaware River
  - Oldmans Creek
  - Raccoon Creek
  - Repaupo Creek
  - Mantua Creek
  - Woodbury Creek
  - Big Timber Creek
  - Cooper River
  - Pennsauken Creek
  - Rancocas Creek
    - North Branch Rancocas Creek
      - Greenwood Branch
        - Bisphams Mill Creek
        - Pole Bridge Branch
        - Mount Misery Brook
    - South Branch Rancocas Creek
      - Friendship Creek
        - Burrs Mill Brook
      - Southwest Branch Rancocas Creek
        - Sharps Run
        - Little Creek
  - Assiscunk Creek
    - Barkers Brook
  - Crafts Creek
  - Blacks Creek
  - Crosswicks Creek
    - Back Creek
    - Doctors Creek
  - Assunpink Creek
    - Shabakunk Creek
    - Shipetaukin Creek
  - Jacobs Creek
  - Fiddlers Creek
  - Moores Creek
  - Swan Creek
  - Alexauken Creek
  - Wickecheoke Creek
  - Lockatong Creek
  - Nishisakawick Creek
  - Harihokake Creek
  - Hakihokake Creek
  - Musconetcong River
    - Lubbers Run
      - Punkhorn Creek
  - Pohatcong Creek
  - Lopatcong Creek
  - Pequest River
    - Beaver Brook
    - Bear Creek
  - Paulins Kill
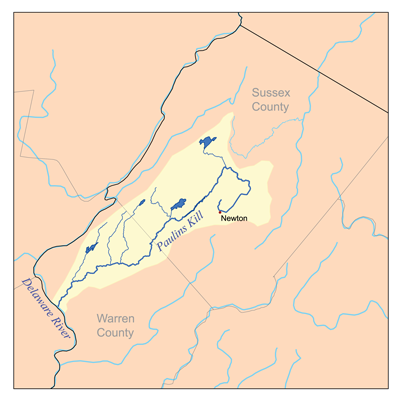
    Paulins Kill Drainage Basin
  - Flat Brook
    - Big Flat Brook
    - Little Flat Brook

== Alphabetically ==
- Abbots Creek
- Absecon Creek
- Albertson Brook
- Alexauken Creek
- Alloway Creek
- Ambrose Brook
- Arthur Kill (tidal strait)
- Assiscunk Creek
- Assunpink Creek
- Back Brook (New Jersey)
- Back Creek
- Back Creek
- Baldwins Creek
- Ballanger Creek
- Barkers Brook
- Bass River
- Batsto River
- Bear Brook (Millstone River tributary)
- Bear Brook (Pascack Brook tributary)
- Bear Creek
- Beaver Brook
- Beaverdam Brook
- Beden Brook
- Berrys Creek
- Big Flat Brook
- Big Graveling Creek (tidal channel)
- Big Timber Creek
- Birch Swamp Brook
- Bisphams Mill Creek
- Black Brook (Passaic River tributary)
- Black Brook (Whippany River tributary)
- Black Creek
- Black River
- Blacks Creek
- Blue Brook
- Bonygutt Brook
- Bound Brook
- Branch Back Brook
- Burrs Mill Brook
- Canoe Brook
- Carters Brook
- Cat Tail Brook
- Cedar Brook
- Cedar Creek (Barnegat Bay)
- Cedar Creek (Delaware Bay)
- Cedar Swamp Creek
- Clove Brook
- Cohansey River
- Cooper River
- Cory's Brook
- Crab Brook
- Crafts Creek
- Cranbury Brook
- Cross Brook
- Crosswicks Creek
- Cruser Brook
- Cow Yard Brook
- Dead River
- Deep Voll Brook
- Deepavaal Brook
- Deep Run Brook
- Delaware River
- Dennis Creek
- Devils Brook
- Diamond Brook
- Dividing Creek
- Doctors Creek
- Duck Pond Run
- Dwars Kill
- East Creek
- Elizabeth River
- English Creek
- Fenwick Creek
- Fiddlers Creek
- First River or Mill Brook
- Fishing Creek
- Flat Brook
- Fleischer Brook
- Foulerton's Brook
- Friendship Creek
- Fulling Mill Stream
- Game Creek
- Goffle Brook
- Great Brook
- Great Ditch
- Great Egg Harbor River
- Great Swamp Brook
- Green Brook
- Greenwood Branch
- Hackensack River
- Hakihokake Creek
- Harihokake Creek
- Harrys Brook
- Heards Brook
- Heathcote Brook
- Heathcote Brook Branch
- Honey Branch
- Ho-Ho-Kus Brook
- Holland Brook
- Hope Creek
- Hospitality Branch
- Hudson River
- Indian Grove Brook
- Ireland Brook
- Jacobs Creek
- Kill Van Kull (tidal strait)
- Lamington River
- Landing Creek
- Lawrence Brook
- Lewis Brook
- Little Bear Brook
- Little Diamond Brook
- Little Egg Harbor River
- Little Ease Run
- Little Flat Brook
- Lockatong Creek
- Lopatcong Creek
- Lubbers Run
- Mad Horse Creek
- Mahwah River
- Manalapan Brook
- Manantico Creek
- Manasquan River
- Mannington Creek
- Mantua Creek
- Manumuskin River
- Marshes Creek
- Matawan Creek
- Matchaponix Brook
- Maurice River
- Metedeconk River
- Middle Brook
- Middlebush Brook
- Mill Brook or First River
- Mile Run
- Millstone River
- Molly Ann Brook
- Moores Creek
- Mount Misery Brook
- Morses Creek
- Muddy Run
- Mullica River
- Musconetcong River
- Muskee Creek
- Musquapsink Brook
- Naakpunkt Brook
- Nacote Creek
- Nantuxent Creek
- Navesink River
- Neepaulakating Creek
- Negro Run
- Nescochague Creek
- Neshanic River
- Nine Mile Run
- Nishayne Brook
- Nishisakawick Creek
- Nomahegan Brook
- North Branch Metedeconk River
- North Branch Rancocas Creek
- North Branch Raritan River
- North River
- Oakeys Brook
- Ogden Creek
- Oldmans Creek
- Oranoaken Creek
- Oswego River
- Overpeck Creek
- Oyster Creek
- Papakating Creek
- Parrow Brook
- Pascack Brook
- Passaic River
- Patcong Creek
- Paulins Kill
- Peckman River
- Penns Brook
- Pennsauken Creek
- Pequannock River
- Pequest River
- Peters Brook (Stony Brook tributary)
- Peters Brook (Raritan River tributary)
- Pike Run
- Pine Tree Run
- Pochuck Creek
- Pohatcong Creek
- Pole Bridge Branch
- Pompton River
- Pump Branch
- Punkhorn Creek
- Raccoon Creek
- Rahway River
- Ramapo River
- Randolph Brook
- Rancocas Creek
- Raritan River
- Repaupo Creek
- Ridgeway Branch
- Roaring Brook
- Roaring Ditch
- Rock Brook
- Rockaway Creek
- Rockaway River
- Rocky Brook
- Royce Brook
- Saddle River
- Salem River
- Sawmill Brook
- Scotland Run
- Second River
- Shabakunk Creek
- Shallow Brook
- Shark River
- Shipetaukin Creek
- Shrewsbury River
- Simonson Brook
- Six Mile Run
- Slippery Rock Brook
- Slough Brook
- Sluice Creek
- Smith Creek
- South Branch Metedeconk River
- South Branch Rancocas Creek
- South Branch Raritan River
- South River (Great Egg Harbor River tributary)
- South River (Raritan River tributary)
- Southwest Branch Rancocas Creek
- Sparkill Creek
- Spring Garden Brook
- Squaw Brook
- Steep Hill Brook
- Stephen Creek
- Stevenson Brook
- Still Run
- Stony Brook (Green Brook tributary)
- Stony Brook (Millstone River tributary)
- Stony Brook Branch
- Stow Creek
- Sucker Brook
- Swan Creek
- Swimming River
- Ten Mile Run
- Terhune Run
- Third River
- Timber Run
- Toms River
- Toney's Brook
- Tuckahoe River
- Tulpehocken Creek
- Turtle Creek
- Union Branch
- Wading River
- Wallkill River
- Wanaque River
- Wawayanda Creek
- West Branch Wading River
- West Creek
- Westecunk Creek
- Whippany River
- Wickecheoke Creek
- Wigwam Brook
- Woodbridge Creek
- Woodbury Creek
- Woodsville Brook
- Yantacaw Brook
- Yellow River

== See also ==
- List of waterways
- List of rivers in the United States
- List of canals in the United States
