= Little Diamond Brook =

River in New Jersey, United States

Coordinates: 40.941273°N 74.136316°W

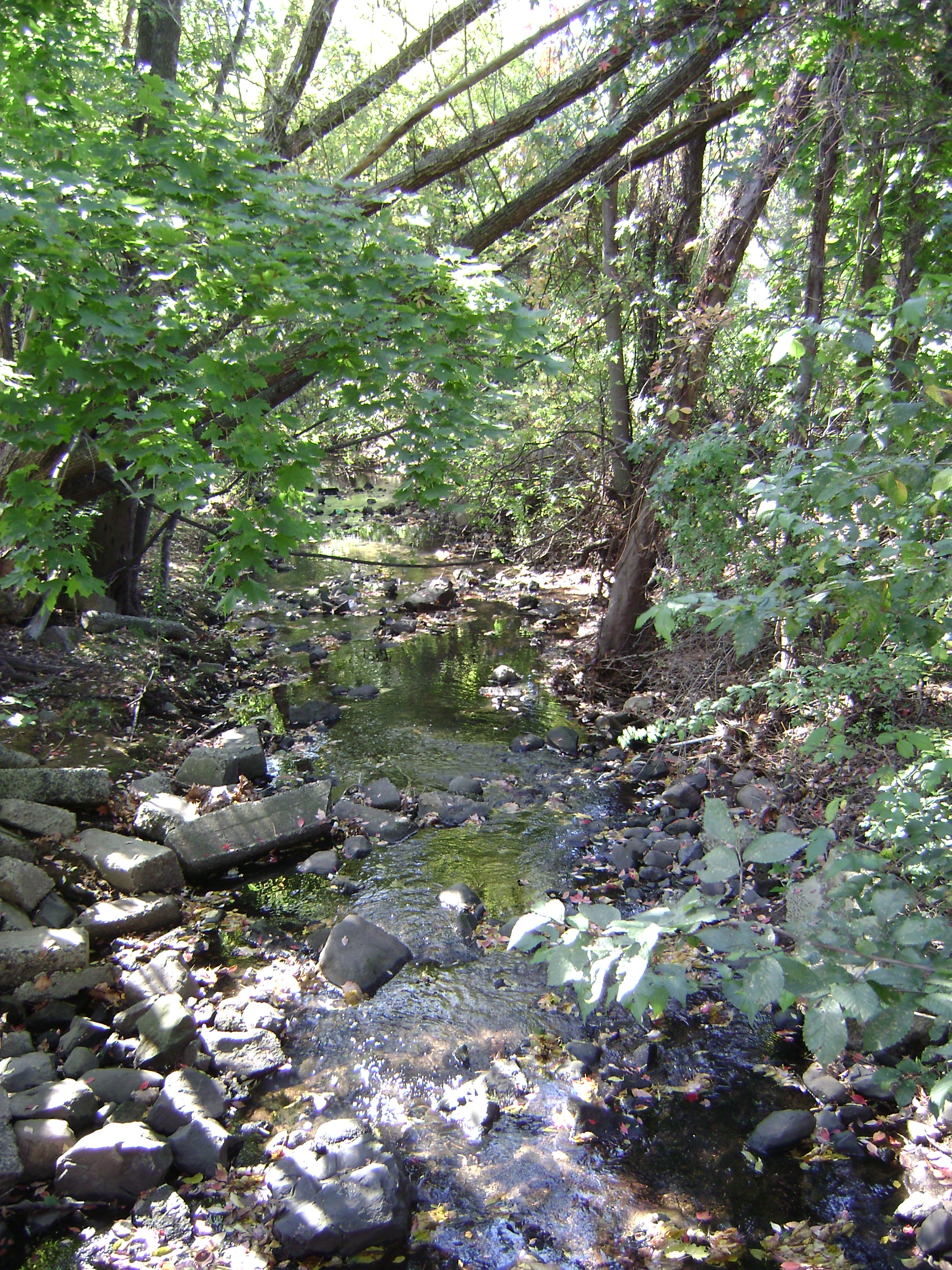
Little Diamond Brook viewed from 11th Street in Fair Lawn

Little Diamond Brook is a tributary of the Passaic River which flows south through a section of Bergen County in New Jersey. Heading up the approximately two mile long brook from the Passaic River, one encounters the towns of Fair Lawn and Glen Rock.

Little Diamond Brook is considered to be in part of the Goffle Brook drainage basin, but it has no junctions with Goffle Brook and is separated from it by two brooks, Diamond Brook (a neighboring brook considered to be its larger counterpart), and Stevenson Brook, which both flow south to the Passaic River between Goffle Brook and Little Diamond Brook. Both Little Diamond Brook and Diamond Brook terminate at the Passaic River in proximity to each other.

== See also ==
- List of rivers of New Jersey
