= Primrose Brook =

River in New Jersey, United States

Coordinates: 40°43′20″N 74°30′50″W

Primrose Brook is a tributary of the Passaic River in the Jockey Hollow section of the Morristown National Historical Park of northern New Jersey in the United States.

Primrose Brook rises near Post House Road in Harding, flowing South South East through the Great Swamp National Wildlife Refuge to where it joins Great Brook in Harding and then empties into the Passaic River.

== See also ==
- List of rivers of New Jersey
