= Musconetcong =

Musconetcong may refer to the following in the U.S. state of New Jersey:

- Musconetcong County, New Jersey, a proposed county in the 19th Century
- Musconetcong Mountain, a ridge in the Highlands region
- Musconetcong River, a tributary of the Delaware River
- Lake Musconetcong, in Sussex County
