= Punkhorn Creek =

Stream in New Jersey, United States

Coordinates: 40°58′15″N 74°42′13″W

Punkhorn Creek is a small stream in the middle of Byram Township, Sussex County, New Jersey. It flows southwest from Lake Bottom, on the north side of and parallel with Amity Road, to Roseville Pond. It is a tributary of Lubbers Run, which is a tributary of the Musconetcong River. It joins Lubbers Run at Lake Lackawanna.

== See also ==
- List of rivers of New Jersey
