= Great Egg Harbor River =

River in southern New Jersey, United States

Coordinates: 39°18′15″N 74°38′59″W

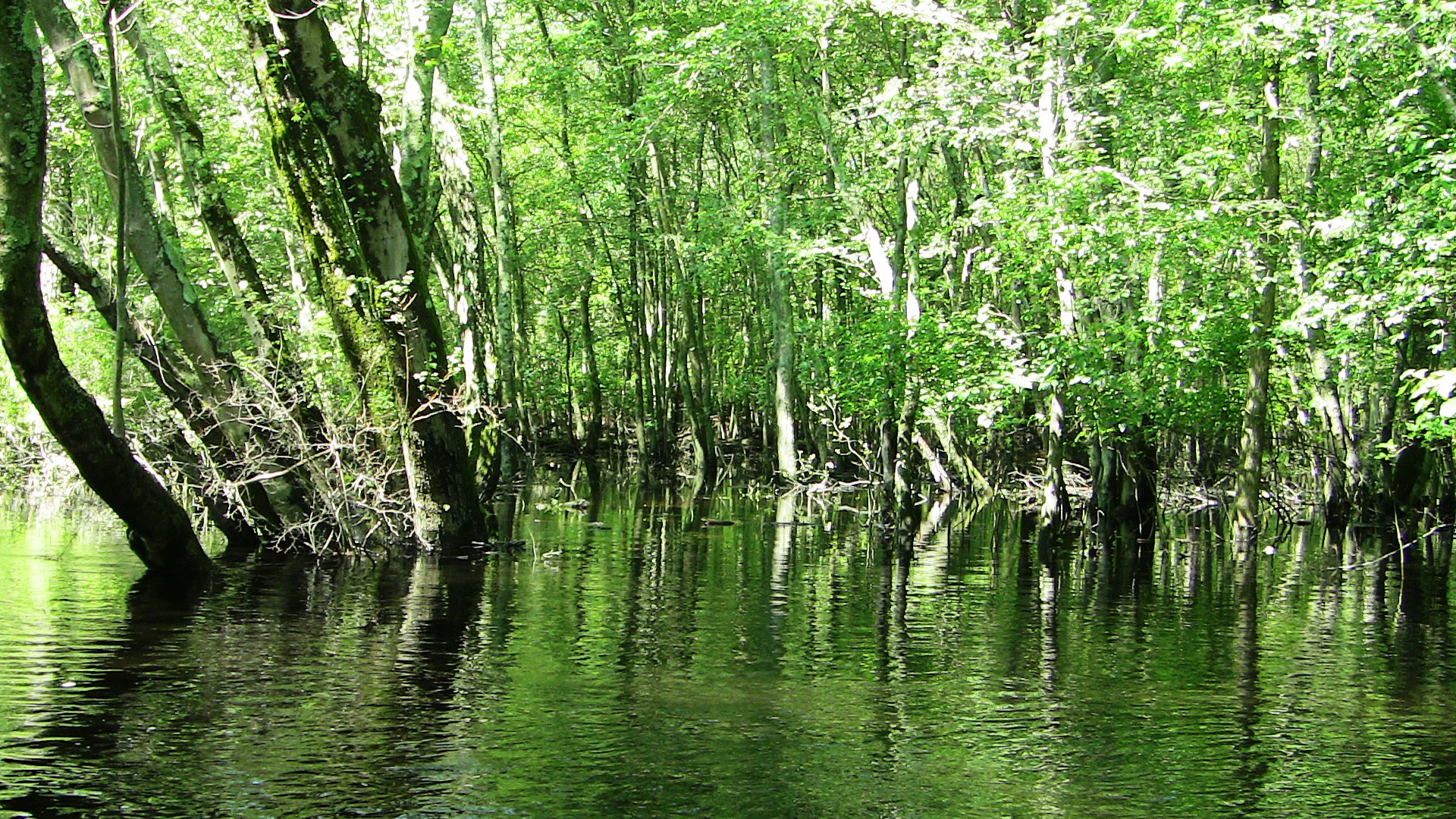
- Shore of the Great Egg Harbor River between Penny Pot and Weymouth Furnace

National Wild and Scenic River
- Type: Scenic, Recreational
- Designated: October 27, 1992

The Great Egg Harbor River is a 55.0-mile-long (88.5 km) river in South Jersey. It is one of the major rivers that traverse the largely pristine Pinelands, draining 308 square miles (800 km^{2}) of wetlands into the Atlantic Ocean at Great Egg Harbor, from which it takes its name.

Great Egg Harbor (and thus the river) got its name from Dutch explorer Cornelius Jacobsen May. In 1614, Mey came upon the inlet to the Great Egg Harbor River. The meadows were so covered with shorebird and waterfowl eggs that he called it "Eyren Haven" (Egg Harbor). Today, the National Park Service considers it one of the top 10 places in North America for birding.

== Description ==
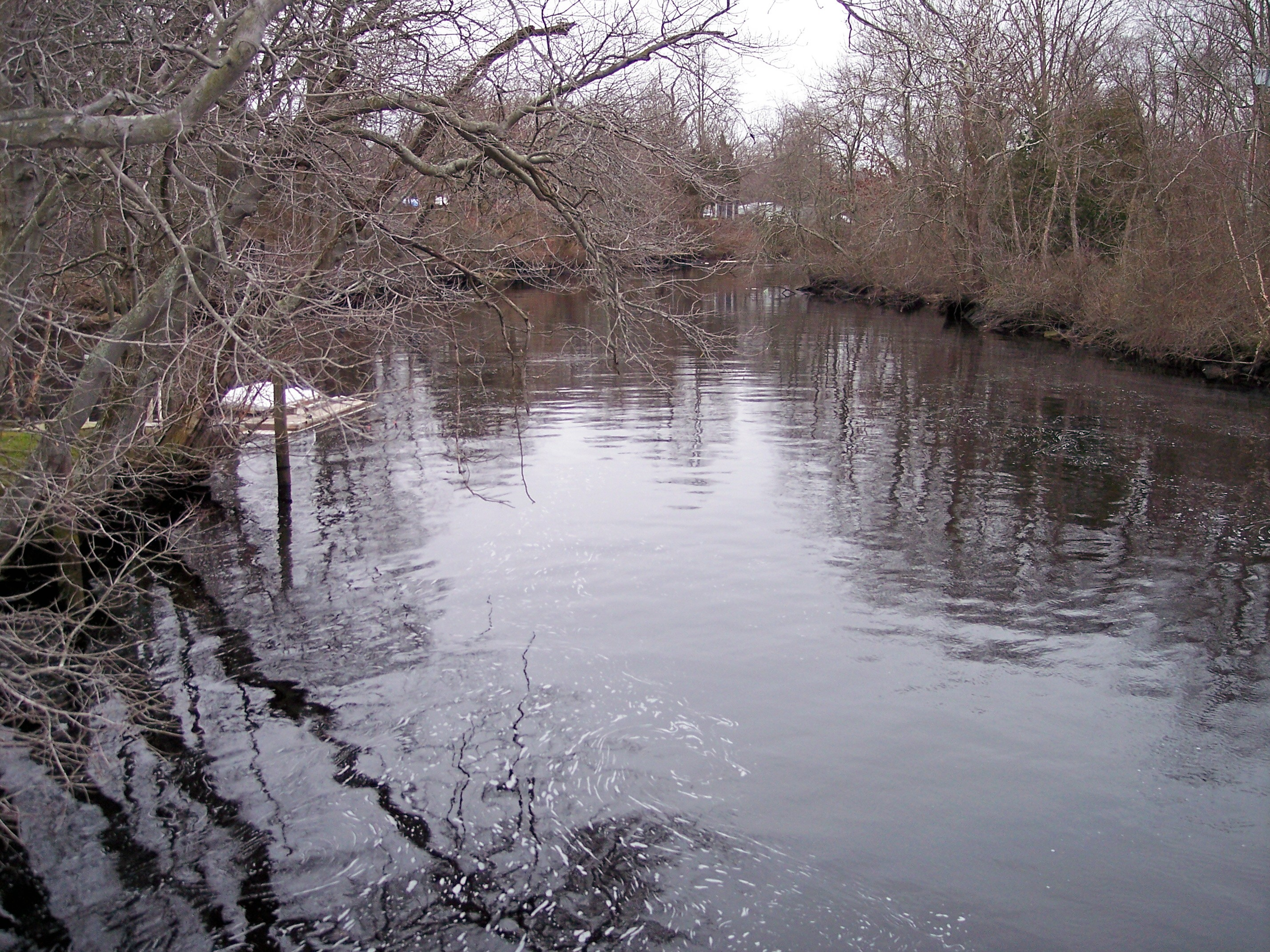
The Great Egg Harbor River in Mays Landing

The Great Egg Harbor River rises in the suburbs southeast of Camden near Berlin and flows generally southeast, to the south of the Atlantic City Expressway, entering Great Egg Harbor approximately 5 miles (8 km) southwest of Atlantic City. The lower 10 miles (16 km) of the river provide a navigable estuary as far as Mays Landing. The Tuckahoe River enters Great Egg Harbor just to the south of the mouth of the river.

Before the arrival of Europeans to the area in the 18th century, it was inhabited by Lenape. During the American Revolutionary War, its estuary sheltered privateers. The presence of "bog iron" along the river provided material for cannonballs and led to the construction of blast furnaces, as well as glass and brick factories, until the middle of the 19th century.

In 1992, the United States Congress designated 129 miles (208 km) of the river and its tributaries as the Great Egg Harbor Scenic and Recreational River, as part of the National Wild and Scenic Rivers System. It is the longest canoeing river within the Pinelands. It can be paddled for 47 miles (76 km) from New Brooklyn, near Route 536, all the way to Beesley's Point. The river is noted for its tea-colored "cedar water", the product of the iron and tannin content of the fallen cedar leaves along much of its length. It provides abundant habitat for waterfowl in the region. The fish populations include striped bass and alewife herring.

As of July 2015, 5,635.77 acres (22.8072 km^{2}) of land along the river in Atlantic County is owned and administered by the New Jersey Division of Fish and Wildlife as the Great Egg Harbor River Wildlife Management Area.

== See also ==
- List of New Jersey rivers
- List of New Jersey wildlife management areas

== Tributaries ==
- English Creek
- Hospitality Branch
- South River
- Stephen Creek
