= Harihokake Creek =

Natural watercourse in Hunterdon County, New Jersey, USA

Coordinates: 40.545370°N 75.072055°W

Harihokake Creek (once known as Cakceahocake Creek) is a 7.0-mile-long (11.3 km) tributary of the Delaware River in Hunterdon County, New Jersey in the United States.

The headwaters of the Harihokake begin at springs in the Musconetcong Mountain ridge in Alexandria Township. On the way south it passes through Mount Pleasant before joining the Delaware just above Nishisakawick Creek in Frenchtown.

== See also ==
- List of rivers of New Jersey
