= Hakihokake Creek =

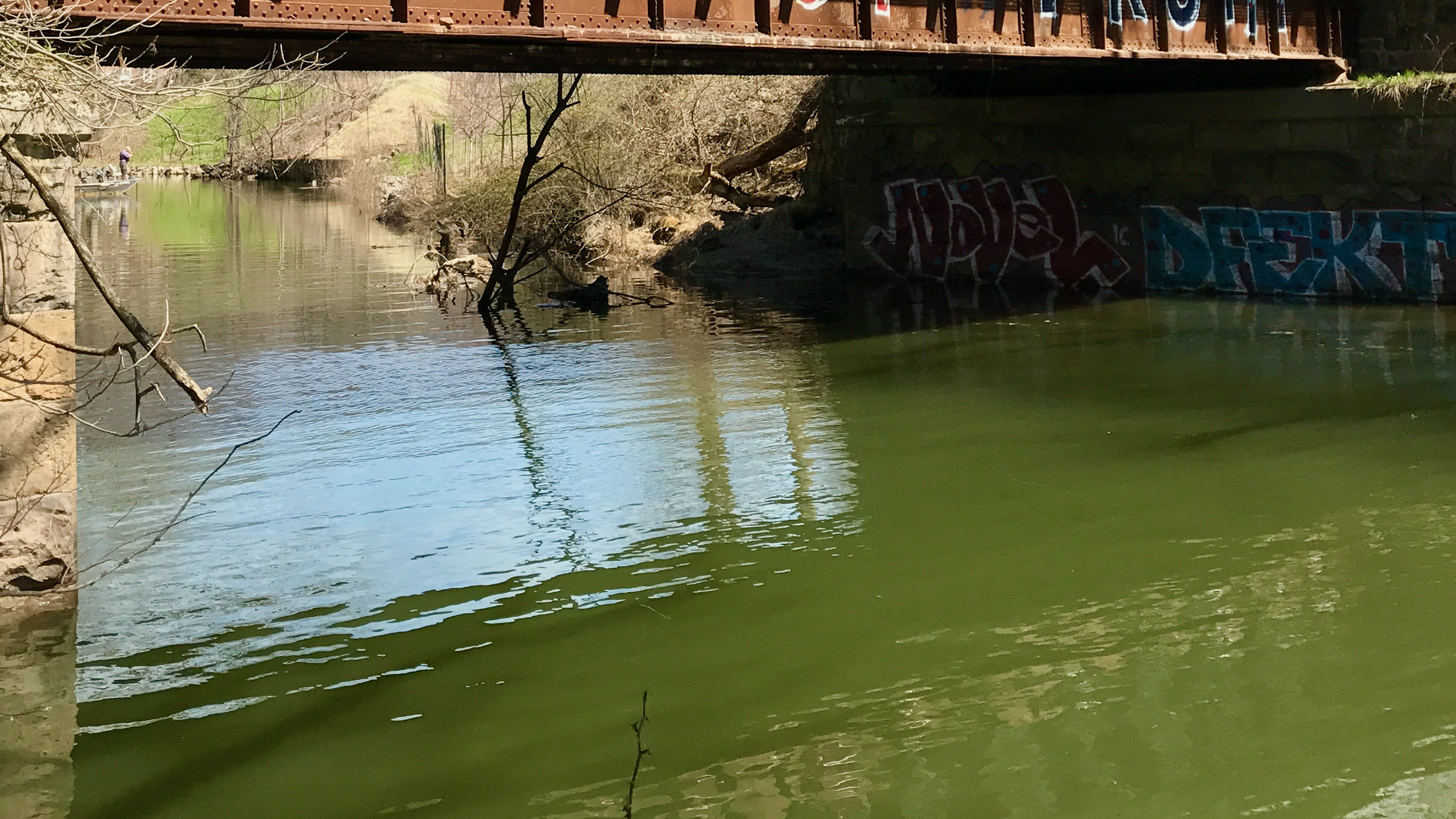
- Hakihokake Creek in Milford near the Delaware River

Location
- Country: United States
- State: New Jersey
- Region: Hunterdon County

Physical characteristics
- Source
  - location: Alexandria Township
  - coordinates: 40°38′8.4″N 75°3′23.6″W
- Mouth: Delaware River
  - location: Milford
  - coordinates: 40°33′43.9″N 75°5′30.3″W

Basin features
- River system: Delaware River

Hakihokake Creek, also known as Quequacommissicong Creek or Milford Creek, is a 8.4-mile-long (13.5 km) tributary of the Delaware River in Hunterdon County, New Jersey in the United States.

The Hakihokake's headwaters begins in the Musconetcong Mountains in forested wetlands in Holland and Alexandria townships and runs southwest through Sweet Hollow and Little York before joining the Delaware River just upstream of its sister tributary Harihokake Creek at Milford.

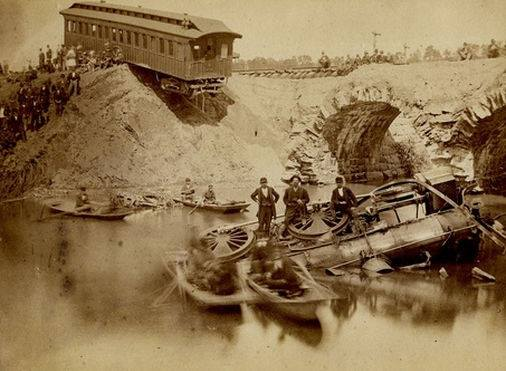
October 4, 1877, rail accident of the Pennsylvania Railroad at the bridge over Hakihokake Creek in Milford, New Jersey

== See also ==
- List of rivers of New Jersey
