= Game Creek (New Jersey) =

River in New Jersey, United States

Coordinates: 39.668614°N 75.462341°W

Game Creek is a 7.4-mile-long (11.9 km) tributary of the Salem River in southwestern New Jersey in the United States.

== See also ==
- List of rivers of New Jersey
