= Salem River =

River in the United States of America

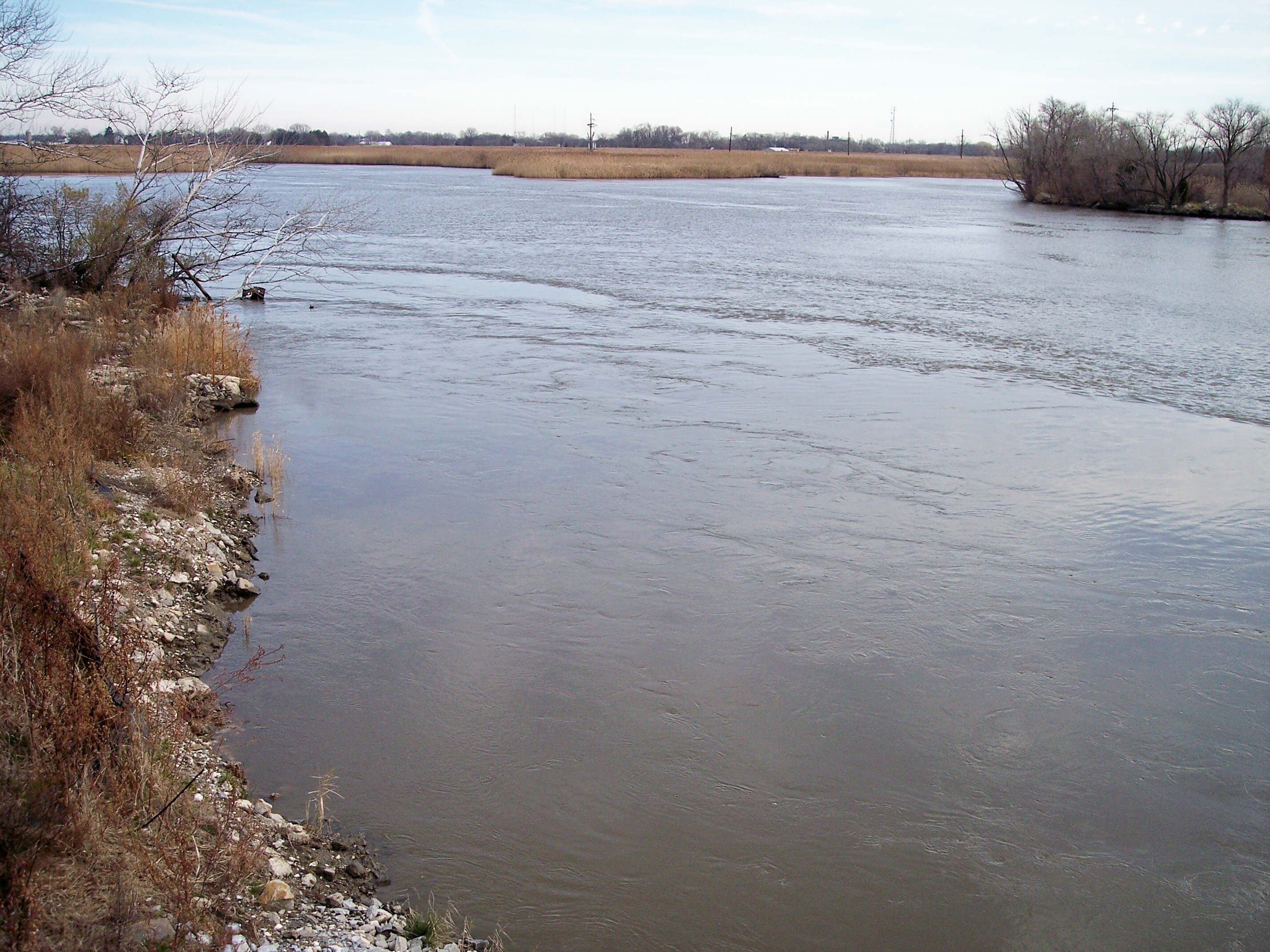
- The Salem River in Salem in 2006

Location
- Country: United States
- State: New Jersey
- City: Salem

Physical characteristics
- Source
  - location: Upper Pittsgrove Township
  - coordinates: 39°35′59″N 75°13′45″W
- Mouth: Delaware River
  - location: boundary of Pennsville and Elsinboro townships
  - coordinates: 39°34′23″N 75°30′44″W
  - elevation: 0 ft (0 m)
- Length: 35 mi (56 km)
- Basin size: 110 mi^{2} (280 km^{2})plus

The Salem River is a 34.7-mile-long (55.8 km) tributary of the Delaware River in southwestern New Jersey in the United States.

The course and watershed of the Salem River are entirely within Salem County. Tributaries of the Salem include Game Creek, Mannington Creek, and Fenwick Creek. The river rises in Upper Pittsgrove Township and flows initially westwardly, through Pilesgrove Township and the borough of Woodstown and along the boundaries of Carneys Point and Mannington Townships. Near Deepwater it approaches to within 2 miles (3 km) of the Delaware River, a distance breached by the Salem (Deepwater) Canal, which connects the two rivers. From there the Salem River turns to the south, flowing along the boundary of Mannington and Pennsville Townships, where it widens into a meandering shallow estuary, Kates Creek Meadow, and passes the city of Salem, its head of navigability. It flows into the Delaware River from the east near the head of Delaware Bay, on the boundary of Pennsville and Elsinboro townships, approximately 2 miles (3 km) west of Salem and approximately 5 miles (8 km) southeast of Finns Point.

The Delaware and the Salem are tidal. The Delaware River Main Channel is maintained at a depth of 40 feet (12 m) and expected to be 45 feet (14 m) in 2017 Reach D, which includes the entrance to Port of Salem, was completed in 2010. The shipping channel of the Salem River is much shallower, making the city a low draft port, which prohibits use by Handymax class ships. The river is entered though Salem Cove about 50 miles (80 km) from the entrance of the Delaware Bay. The channel travels along the southeast side of the cove for 2 miles (3.2 km) and continues another 3 miles (4.8 km) upstream of the first vehicular bridge crossing it. The Salem River and Cut-Off was first channelized in 1925 to a depth of 16 feet (4.9 m).

According to the Geographic Names Information System, the river has also been known historically as Firkins Creek, Varkens Kill, and Varkins Kill (Hogg Creek). The Board on Geographic Names settled on "Salem River" as the stream's name in 1940. The estuary was inhabited by Lenape at the time of European colonization. In 1641, emigrants from the New Haven Colony settled along the Varkens Kill. Fort Elfsborg, a settlement of the New Sweden colony was constructed along the eastern bank of the Delaware near the mouth of the Salem in 1642–1643. The fort was later abandoned because of the prevalence of mosquitoes and the construction of Fort Casimir by the New Netherland Dutch across the river. In 1675, the village of Salem was founded near the mouth of the Salem river as part of the Fenwick Colony.

== See also ==
- List of New Jersey rivers
