= Dividing Creek =

River in New Jersey, United States

Coordinates: 39.2703°N 75.1001°W

Dividing Creek is a 15.3-mile-long (24.6 km) tributary of Delaware Bay in southern New Jersey in the United States.

== See also ==
- List of rivers of New Jersey
