= Slough Brook =

River in New Jersey, United States

Coordinates: 40°46′06″N 74°20′11″W

Slough Brook is a tributary of the Passaic River in Essex County, New Jersey in the United States.

Slough Brook flows through a residential area of central Livingston, mostly filled in or culvertised, with streets now covering what was once the course of the stream. Also, most of the water from this stream was drained to fill a small pond at the Livingston Memorial Park. The stream at its deepest point is no more than 6 inches (15 cm) deep.

== See also ==
- List of rivers of New Jersey
