= Cedar Swamp Creek =

Coordinates: 39°14′52″N 74°47′50″W

National Wild and Scenic Rivers System
- Designated: October 27, 1992

Cedar Swamp Creek is an 8.9-mile-long (14.3 km) tributary of the Tuckahoe River in southeast New Jersey in the United States.

== See also ==
- List of rivers of New Jersey
