= Turtle Creek (New Jersey) =

River in New Jersey, United States

Turtle Creek is a 1.9-mile-long (3.1 km) tributary of the Mullica River in southern New Jersey in the United States.

The stream headwaters arise at 39°35′33″N 74°29′56″W and it flows south-southwest to its confluence with the Mullica River at 39°34′19″N 74°30′17″W.

The community of Wading River lies approximately one mile north of the headwaters at the intersection of Turtle Creek Road and New Jersey Route 542.

From source to outlet, it is entirely surrounded by the tidal marshes of the Swan Bay Wildlife Management Area. The former upper reaches of the stream, reaching some distance north into the Wharton State Forest, have been diverted and given their own channel, reaching the Mullica to the west of the remaining stream.

== See also ==
- List of rivers of New Jersey
