= Nantuxent Creek =

River in New Jersey, United States

Coordinates: 39°17′46″N 75°11′59″W

Nantuxent Creek is a 5.5-mile-long (8.9 km) estuary of Delaware Bay in Cumberland County, New Jersey in the United States.

It rises on the border of Lawrence and Downe Townships, in the marshes to the northwest of Newport, at the convergence of Middle Brook and Pages Run. It forms part of the border between the two townships. As it runs south, then west around Jones Island, it passes the Nantuxent Wildlife Management Area, which lies on the island, and Newport Landing on the other bank. Its named tributaries are all marsh channels which enter it in the vicinity of Jones Island or below.

The creek empties into Nantuxent Cove of Delaware Bay.

== Tributaries ==
- Eagle Island Gut
- Loopers Gut
- Blizzard Neck Gut
- Granddad Gut
- Ponds Creek
- Little Pond Creek
- Nancy Gut
- Hay Gut
- Blackbird Gut

== See also ==
- List of rivers of New Jersey
