= Cedar Creek (Barnegat Bay) =

River in New Jersey, United States

Coordinates: 39°42′16″N 74°13′37″W

Cedar Creek is an 18.9-mile-long (30.4 km) tributary of Barnegat Bay in Ocean County in the southern New Jersey Pine Barrens in the United States. It extends from the spillway at Bamber Lake, at the confluence of Cooks Branch and Chamberlain Branch, to Barnegat Bay. Its outflow is located between John C. Bartlett Jr. County Park to the north, and Cedar Creek Point to the south.

== See also ==
- List of rivers of New Jersey
