= Dead River (New Jersey) =

Tributary of the Passaic River in New Jersey, United States

Location
- Country: United States
- State: New Jersey
- County: Somerset

Physical characteristics
- Source: Liberty Corner, New Jersey
  - location: Bernardsville, New Jersey
  - coordinates: 40°41′51″N 74°35′10″W
- Mouth: Warren Township
  - location: Warren Township
  - coordinates: 40°39′00″N 74°31′21″W
  - elevation: 217 ft (66 m)

The Dead River is a tributary of the Passaic River that has its source in Somerset County, New Jersey in the United States.

For several miles it forms the northern border of Warren Township with Bernards Township, both in Somerset County. It joins the Passaic just north of Exit 36 of I-78, and the junction was moved northward, away from the Exit, to allow enough room for the exit ramps. There the river is crossed by King George Road. At the next I-78 westward, Exit 33, the river is crossed by the Martinsville-Liberty Corner Road, and there is extensive commercial development in both Warren and Bernards north of the Exit and south of the river. The Somerset Hills Hotel is on the banks of the river in Warren, and its sister hotel, now Indigo, is to the west on its banks in Bernards. For many years the Indigo was known as The Inn at Somerset Hills, and its lounge-tavern was known as The Dead River Pub. Between the two I-78 exits the river is crossed by one road, known in Warren as Dead River Road and Bernards as Acken Road. Prior to World War II there were several brick works along the river due to the good clay found there.

A 1960s housing development in Warren, originally called Dead River Estates, found more success when renamed Whispering Hills. The Dead River Road bridge was for a long time closed due to flooding and disrepair, and a controversy over whether it should be repaired and reopened significantly affected the 1983 election for Warren Township Committee. From river source to the Passaic the land is very flat, which, except during heavy rainfalls, results in hardly any detectable flow in the river, hence its name—which has absolutely nothing to do with anything "dead" along its course, save the river itself.

== See also ==
- List of New Jersey rivers
