= Prescott Creek =

River in New Jersey, United States

Coordinates: 40.5877°N 74.8672°W

Prescott Creek is a creek in Clinton Township, New Jersey in the United States.

Prescott Creek branches off of Prescott Brook. Because of residential development and the expansion of New Jersey Route 31, the creek was culvertised and now flows underground, returning above ground near Cider Mill Road.

== See also ==
- List of rivers of New Jersey
