= Diamond Brook =

Diamond Brook Bass Brook
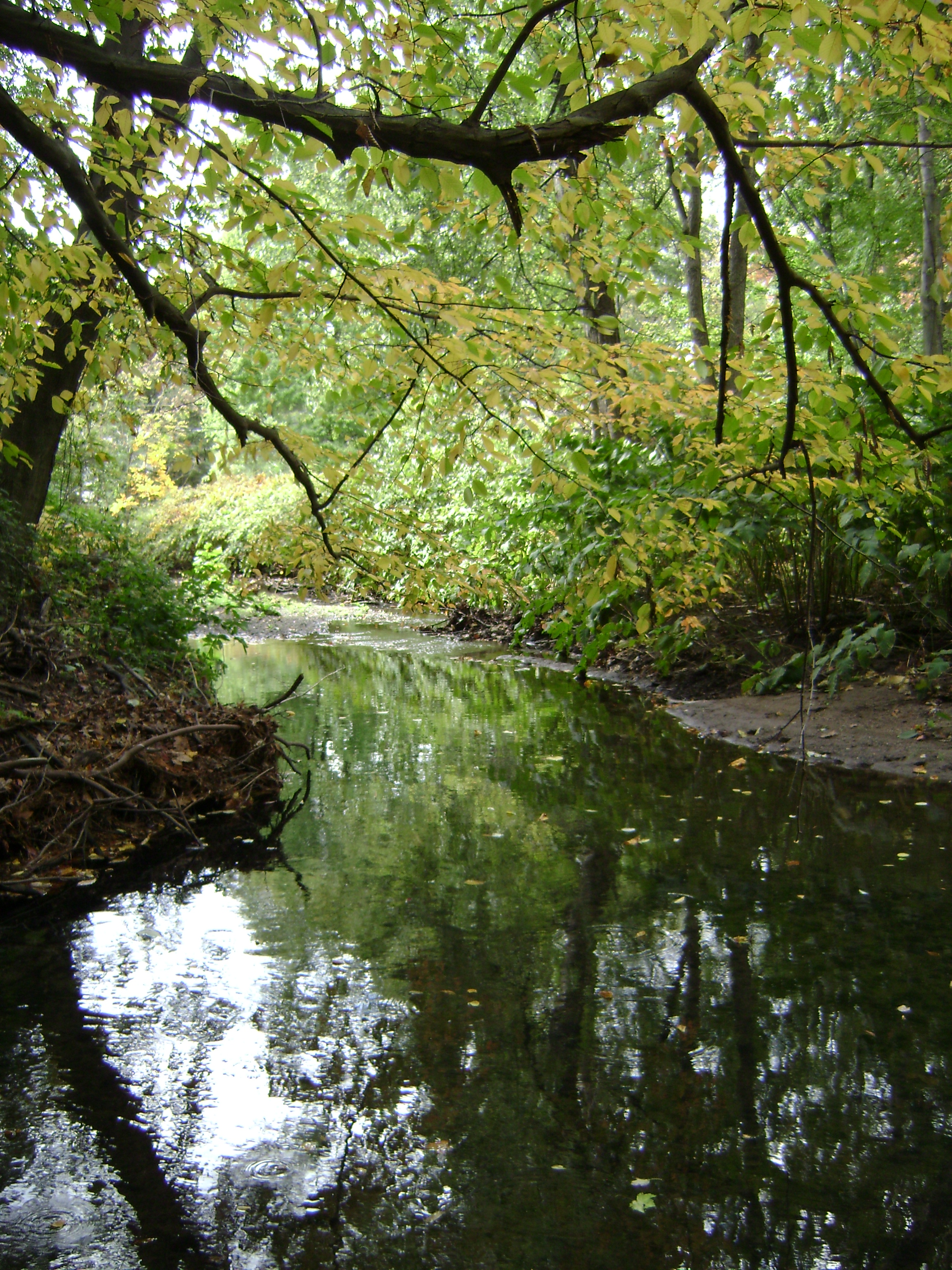
- Flowing through Diamond Brook Park, Glen Rock

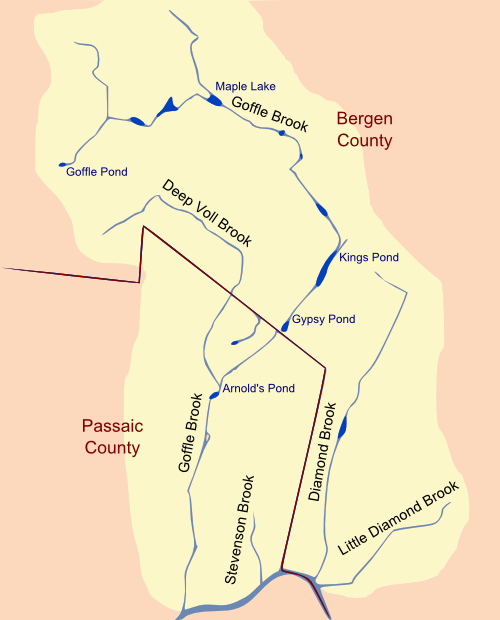
- Diamond Brook and Goffle Brook Watershed

Location
- Country: United States
- State: New Jersey
- County: Bergen

Physical characteristics
- Source
  - location: Ridgewood, Bergen County, New Jersey, United States
  - coordinates: 40°58′40.89″N 74°7′58.36″W
  - elevation: 118 ft (36 m)
- Mouth: Passaic River
  - location: Fair Lawn, Bergen County, New Jersey, United States
  - coordinates: 40°56′26.87″N 74°8′36.05″W
  - elevation: 27 ft (8.2 m)
- Length: 3 mi (4.8 km)

Diamond Brook, also known as Bass Brook, is a tributary of the Passaic River which flows south through a section of Bergen County in New Jersey, United States. Heading up the brook from the Passaic River, one encounters the boroughs of Fair Lawn and Glen Rock, as well as the village of Ridgewood.

== Description ==
Diamond Brook passes through a largely suburban setting, though its southern end runs under an industrial complex in Fair Lawn before terminating at the Passaic River. The head of Diamond Brook is located south of Godwin Ave in Ridgewood, near the border of Midland Park. Diamond Brook is considered part of the Goffle Brook drainage basin, but it has no junctions with Goffle Brook and is partly separated from it by another brook, Stevenson Brook, which flows south to the Passaic River between Goffle Brook and Diamond Brook in Hawthorne.

Another brook east of Diamond Brook, Little Diamond Brook, is considered to be in part of the same drainage basin as Diamond Brook. Little Diamond Brook and Diamond Brook terminate at the Passaic River within about five hundred feet of each other.

== History ==
Diamond Brook was historically known as Bass Brook. It once traveled through a series of springs and wetlands along the western edge of Glen Rock. In the 21st century, only a few wetlands remain intact, with two preserved as parts of the Glen Rock Arboretum and Diamond Brook Park. Some natural springs also remain intact behind Orchard School in Ridgewood.

In the 1870s, Diamond Brook’s gradation was sufficient to support a water wheel operated by the Marinus Lumber Mill in Glen Rock. When the mill finally closed the wheel and its accompanying machinery were too cumbersome to move. Today the wheel remains where it once operated, buried beneath the street near the intersection of Rock Road and the Boulevard.

== See also ==
- List of New Jersey rivers
