= Big Graveling Creek =

River in New Jersey, United States

Coordinates: 39.532896°N 74.429871°W

Big Graveling Creek is a 2.9-mile-long (4.7 km) tributary of the Mullica River in southern New Jersey in the United States.

It is a narrow, meandering tidal channel (gut) through the salt marshes of the Edwin B. Forsythe National Wildlife Refuge, connecting the Mullica and Mott Creek.

== See also ==
- List of rivers of New Jersey
