= Fenwick Creek =

River in New Jersey, United States

Coordinates: 39.582385°N 75.412158°W

Fenwick Creek is a 4.7-mile-long (7.6 km) tributary of the Salem River in southwestern New Jersey in the United States.

The mouth is the Port of Salem.

== See also ==
- List of rivers of New Jersey
