= Tuckahoe River (New Jersey) =

River in New Jersey, United States

Coordinates: 39.306941°N 74.820606°W

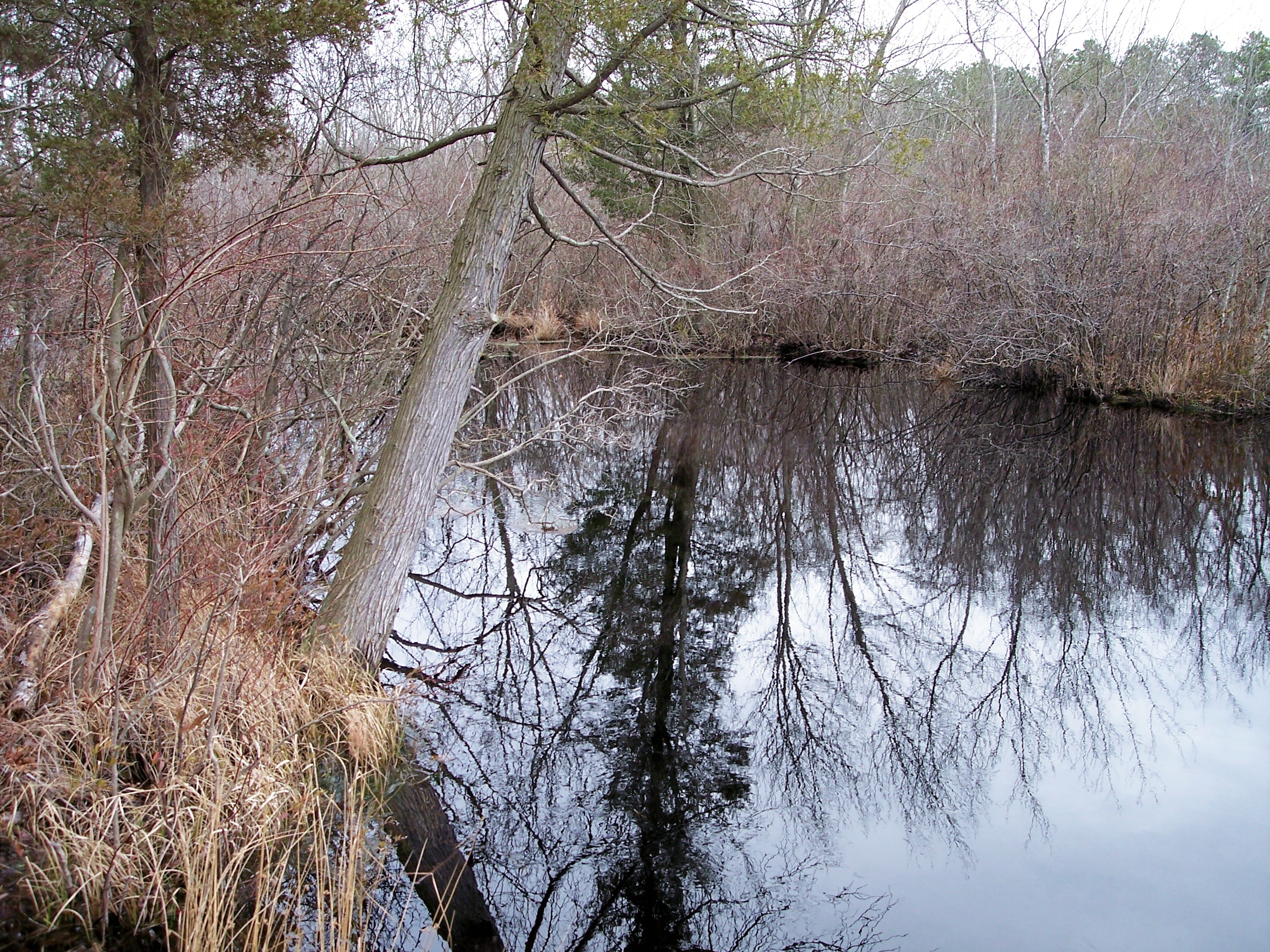
- The Tuckahoe River in Belleplain State Forest in 2006

National Wild and Scenic River
- Designated: October 27, 1992

The Tuckahoe River is a 27.6-mile-long (44.4 km) blackwater river in southern New Jersey in the United States.

One of the few blackwater rivers in the northeastern United States, the river drains an area of the southern Pinelands and empties into the Atlantic Ocean.

== Course ==
The Tuckahoe River rises in central Atlantic County, approximately 5 miles (8 km) east of Vineland and flows south, then east, forming part of the boundary between Atlantic and Cape May counties, then past Tuckahoe, where it becomes navigable. It flows into Great Egg Harbor Bay just south of the mouth of the Great Egg Harbor River, approximately 5 miles (8 km) southwest of Atlantic City. The lower 4 miles (6 km) form a widening estuary through Great Cedar Swamp downstream from its head of navigation at Tuckahoe.

== Tributaries ==
- Cedar Swamp Creek

== See also ==
- List of rivers of New Jersey
