= Shallow Brook =

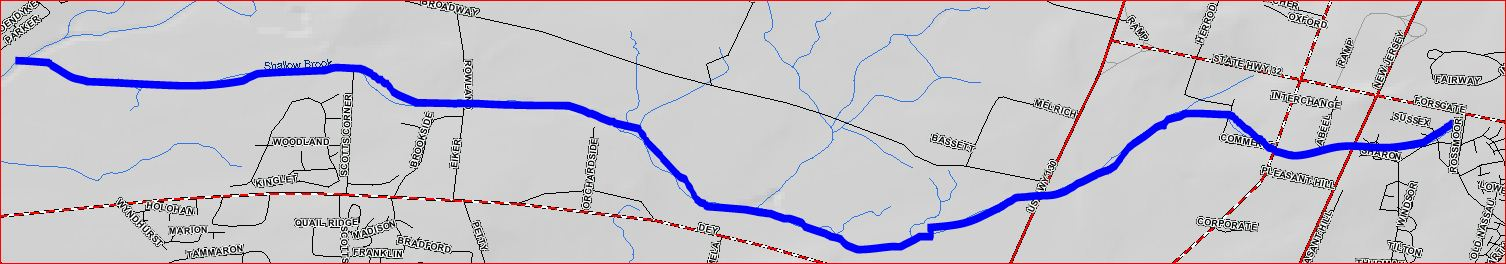
- Shallow Brook map

Location
- Country: United States

Physical characteristics
- Source
  - coordinates: 40°20′47″N 74°29′4″W
- Mouth
  - coordinates: 40°20′50″N 74°34′59″W
  - elevation: 79 ft (24 m)

Basin features
- Progression: Devils Brook, Millstone River, Raritan River, Atlantic Ocean

Shallow Brook is a tributary of Devils Brook in central New Jersey in the United States.

Shallow Brook flows generally parallel to the Devils Brook, draining a similar area in Middlesex and Mercer counties.

== Course ==
The Shallow Brook's source is at 40°20′47″N 74°29′4″W, near the Rossmoor residential area and exit 8A on the New Jersey Turnpike. It crosses Route 130 near Broadway Street and flows west, generally parallel to Dey Road (CR-614), until it drains into the Devils Brook at 40°20′50″N 74°34′59″W.

== Accessibility ==
Shallow Brook is easily accessible through road crossings and the Devils Brook, its parent brook.

== See also ==
- List of rivers of New Jersey
