= Foulerton's Brook =

Coordinates: 40.820456°N 74.32087°W

- Location within New Jersey

Location
- Country: United States
- State: New Jersey
- County: Essex County

National Wild and Scenic Rivers System

Map of the north (green) and south (magenta) branches of Foulerton's (Fullerton's) Brook. The original mouth of the brook is indicated in cyan.

Foulerton's Brook is a tributary of the Passaic River in Roseland, New Jersey in the United States. It is composed of 2 main branches with both the north and south branches measuring approximately 3 miles long each. Significant portions of the south branch have been routed underground through large concrete pipes.

Foulerton's Brook was rerouted during the construction of Interstate 280 to run behind the Essex County Golf Facility. The mouth of the brook, where it flows into the Passaic River, was moved 650 feet upriver. The brook has a relatively small watershed, draining approximately 4 square miles of land on the eastern flank of Riker Hill in Livingston and Roseland, New Jersey, with the north branch stretching up into Essex Fells, New Jersey.

== History ==
The brook is first named in a deed from 1702 granting Thomas Fullerton 500 acres of land on the south side of the Passaic River in modern day Roseland, New Jersey. In the survey it states "at the mouth of a brook to be called Foulonon's Brook 100 chains (6,600 feet) above (upstream) where Whipona (Whippany) River mouth in the Passaic River". Today we label the Whippany as flowing into the Rockaway River which then joins the Passaic at approximately 40°50'57.5"N 74°19'48.1"W. This is approximately 6,450 feet due north of where Foulerton's Brook enters the Passaic today.

== Alternate Spelling ==
While historically the brook has been known as Foulerton's Brook, this is likely a typographical error from the original deed. The April 1, 1702 deed not only spells the brook as Foulonon's Brook but also misspells Thomas Fullerton's names as either Thomas Foulonon or Fouloton. Since we know the deed was for Thomas Fullerton, and the brook is named as a possessive, it seems to suggest the intended spelling was to be Fullerton's Brook.

A later deed describing the sale of Thomas Fullerton's land to John Styles is written much more clearly and includes the following: "All that tract of land on the south side of Pasaick [sic] River beginning at the mouth of a brook which from hence forth is to be called Fullerton's Brook about one hundred chains above where Whipany [sic] River meets with said Pasaick [sic] River and thence running south..." This deed also clearly identifies the land as belonging to Thomas Fullerton (spelled correctly) and references the earlier April 1, 1702 deed. Taken together this all indicates the original name and intended name of the brook was Fullerton's Brook.

== See also ==
- List of rivers of New Jersey
