= Musconetcong County, New Jersey =

Coordinates: 40.90952°N 74.71406°W

Musconetcong County was a proposed county in New Jersey, which was to be created from parts of Hunterdon and Warren counties.

== Boundaries ==
The 1852 New Jersey Senate Bill No. 97 describes the proposed county as follows:

Beginning at a point in the middle of the river Delaware dividing the states of Pennsylvania and New Jersey, where the Nishisakawick Creek empties into the said river, in the county of Hunterdon, and state of New Jersey, and running thence in the courses of the lines dividing the townships of Alexandria, Kingwood, Franklin and Bethlehem, in the said county of Hunterdon, to a point in the south branch of the Raritan river at the village of Clinton; thence following the course of the lines dividing the townships of Bethlehem, Clinton and Franklin, in the said county of Hunterdon, to a point in the Musconetcong river, forming the division line between the counties of Hunterdon and Warren; thence following the courses of the said Musconetcong river, dividing the township of Bethlehem, in the said county of Hunterdon, from the township of Washington, in the said county of Warren, to the line dividing the township of Franklin and Washington, in the said county of Warren, and running thence in the courses of the said lines dividing the said townships of Franklin and Washington, to a point in the township lines dividing the townships of Franklin, Washington, Oxford and Harmony, in the said county of Warren; thence by the courses of the lines dividing the townships of Franklin, Harmony, Greenwich and Phillipsburg, in the said county of Warren to a point in the middle of the said river Delaware; thence following the courses of the said river Delaware to the place of beginning, be, and the same is hereby erected into a separate county, to be called "The County of Musconetcong," and the said lines shall hereafter be the division lines between the counties of Hunterdon, Warren and Musconetcong.

== History ==
Introduced by Senator William Cowper Alexander (D-Mercer County) on February 18, 1852, Bill No. S97 received its first reading that day and was referred to the Judiciary Committee, from which it was reported without amendment the following day. Considered for second reading on March 4, it was amended and postponed to the next day, where the amendments were taken up by section, the bill ordered engrossed and a third reading ordered. On March 10 the Committee on Engrossed Bills reported its finding that the bill was correctly engrossed. On March 11, however, the Senate voted to postpone the bill to the next Legislature; it was never taken up again.

== Government ==
The proposed legislation designated Bloomsbury, then within Bethlehem Township, as the county seat. As in all counties in New Jersey, the governing body was to be the board of chosen freeholders. Musconetcong was to have its own sheriff, county clerk, surrogate and county prosecutor.

Judicial functions were to have been performed by a circuit court, court of common pleas, court of quarter sessions and court of oyer and terminer.

== Municipalities ==
The following five municipalities were to be included in the proposed Musconetcong County:

- Alexandria Township
- Bethlehem Township
- Franklin Township
- Greenwich Township
- Phillipsburg Township (became Lopatcong)

Municipalities later subdivided from the original five include:

- Alpha
- Bloomsbury
- Clinton (part)
- Frenchtown (part)
- Glen Gardner (part)
- Hampton (part)
- Holland Township
- Lopatcong Township (Formerly Phillipsburg Township)
- Milford
- Phillipsburg
- Pohatcong Township
- Union Township
