= Spring Garden Brook =

Stream in New Jersey, United States

Coordinates: 40.762878°N 74.375984°W

Spring Garden Brook is a tributary of the Passaic River in Morris County, New Jersey in the United States.

Spring Garden Brook flows through the boroughs of Madison and Florham Park.

== See also ==
- List of rivers of New Jersey
