= Cedar Brook =

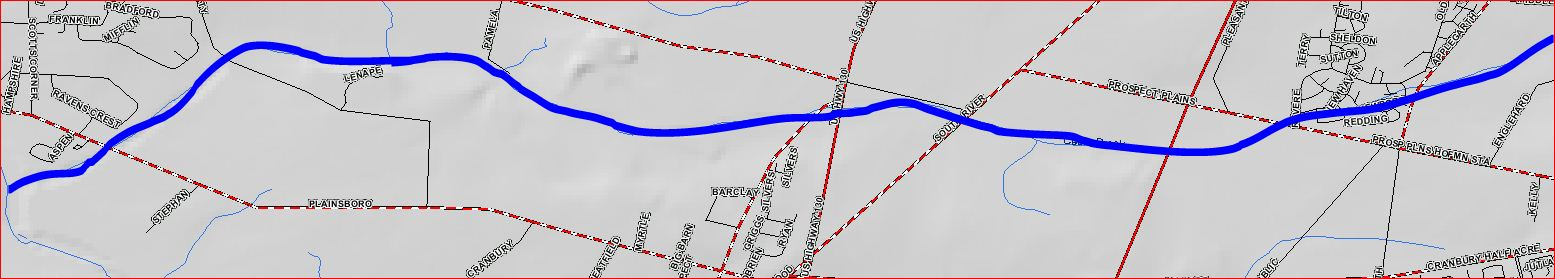
- Map of Cedar Brook

Location
- Country: United States

Physical characteristics
- Source
  - coordinates: 40°19′50″N 74°27′27″W
- Mouth
  - coordinates: 40°19′16″N 74°33′29″W
  - elevation: 79 ft (24 m)

Basin features
- Progression: Cranbury Brook, Millstone River, Raritan River, Atlantic Ocean
- River system: Raritan River system

Cedar Brook is a tributary of Cranbury Brook in Cranbury, New Jersey, United States.

== Course ==
Cedar Brook starts at 40°19′50″N 74°27′27″W, near Exit 8A on the New Jersey Turnpike. It flows southwest, crossing Applegarth Road and Prospect Plains Road before crossing the Turnpike. It then crosses Cranbury-South River Road and Route 130 and flows through a swamp area. It then crosses Plainsboro Cranbury Road before draining into Cranbury Brook at 40°19′16″N 74°33′29″W.

== Accessibility ==
This stream is large and accessible from many of the roads it crosses.

== See also ==
- List of rivers of New Jersey
