= Black Brook (Passaic River tributary) =

River in New Jersey, United States

Coordinates: 40°42′05″N 74°28′06″W

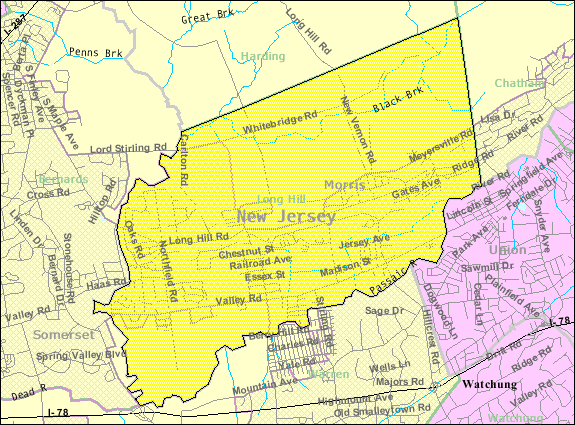
Black Brk shown rising in the north east base of Long Hill Township, New Jersey

Black Brook is a tributary of the Passaic River that flows through the Great Swamp National Wildlife Refuge in Morris County, New Jersey, in the United States. Black Brook rises at the north east base of Long Hill, Chatham Township, Morris County, flows westerly along the hill, by a course of 7 or 8 miles to its recipient in Morris Township, New Jersey. Due to the chemical fertilizer usage in nearby areas, Black Brook has the second worst water quality after Loantaka Brook.

== See also ==
- List of rivers of New Jersey
