= Cedar Creek (Delaware Bay) =

River in New Jersey, United States

Coordinates: 39°17′56″N 75°15′04″W

Cedar Creek is a 10.5-mile-long (16.9 km) stream and estuary of Delaware Bay in Cumberland County, New Jersey in the United States.

It rises in Lawrence Township and flows through Lummistown, where it is dammed twice to form the Lummis Lakes. It is dammed again at Cedarville to form Cedar Lake, below which it enters the marshes and becomes tidal. Fresh Creek, now mostly turned to marsh, ran south to connect it to Middle Brook and cut off Jones Island. Bowers Creek and Howells Creek discharge into it among the marshlands before it empties into Nantuxent Cove of Delaware Bay.

== Tributaries ==
- Howells Creek
- Bowers Creek
- Fresh Creek

== See also ==
- List of rivers of New Jersey
