= Mannington Creek =

River in New Jersey, United States

Coordinates: 39°36′20″N 75°23′23″W

Mannington Creek is a 6.5-mile-long (10.5 km) tributary of the Salem River in southwestern New Jersey in the United States.

== See also ==
- List of rivers of New Jersey
