= Ballanger Creek =

River in New Jersey, United States

Coordinates: 39.55984°N 74.415982°W

Ballanger Creek is a 4.7-mile-long (7.6 km) tributary of the Mullica River in southern New Jersey in the United States. The name is derived from "Belangee," a family of French Huguenots who were early settlers in the area.

It arises in Little Egg Harbor Township, New Jersey, to the west of Tuckerton, and flows south. Crossing under U.S. Route 9, it forms the boundary between Ocean County and Burlington County for the remainder of its course. Passing through abandoned cranberry bogs on the eastern side of a parcel of Bass River State Forest, it enters the tidal marshes of the Mullica, where it is fed by Lower Pasture Creek and World's End Creek. The channel of Mathis Thorofare connects it to Broad Creek to the west. Just below, it meets Fish Creek, and then the larger Winter Creek just before emptying into the Mullica.

== Biodiversity ==
The rare Marsh Rattlesnake Master (Eryngium aquaticum var. aquaticum) and Pine Barren Boneset (Eupatorium resinosum) grow in the abandoned bogs along its course.

== Tributaries ==
- Winter Creek
- Fish Creek
- Mathis Thorofare
- World's End Creek
- Lower Pasture Creek

== See also ==
- List of rivers of New Jersey
