= Bisphams Mill Creek =

River in New Jersey, United States

Coordinates: 39.92794°N 74.59341°W

Bisphams Mill Creek is a 5.9-mile-long (9.5 km) tributary of Greenwood Branch in the southern New Jersey Pine Barrens in the United States.

== See also ==
- List of rivers of New Jersey
