= Randolph Brook =

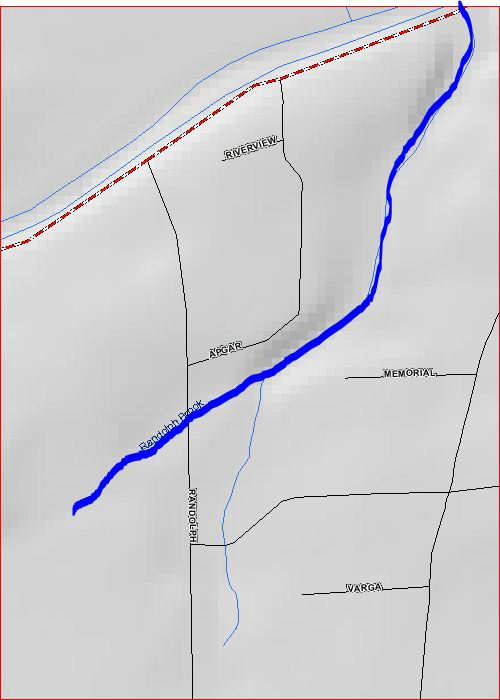
- Map of Randolph Brook

Location
- Country: United States

Physical characteristics
- Source
  - coordinates: 40°32′6″N 74°33′38″W
- Mouth
  - coordinates: 40°33′3″N 74°32′53″W
  - elevation: 20 ft (6.1 m)

Basin features
- Progression: Millstone River, Raritan River, Atlantic Ocean
- River system: Raritan River system

Randolph Brook is a tributary of the Millstone River in northern Franklin Park, New Jersey, United States.

== Course ==
Randolph Brook starts at 40°32′6″N 74°33′38″W, near Randolph Road. It crosses Randolph Road and Westons Canal Road before flowing under the Delaware and Raritan Canal and draining into the Millstone River at 40°33′3″N 74°32′53″W.

== See also ==
- List of rivers of New Jersey
