= Stephen Creek =

River in New Jersey, USA

Coordinates: 39°23′51″N 74°45′23″W

National Wild and Scenic Rivers System
- Designated: October 27, 1992

Stephen Creek is an 8.3-mile-long (13.4 km) tributary of the Great Egg Harbor River in southeast New Jersey in the United States.

This area is known for its numerous creeks and rivers, especially in the vicinity of the Pinelands National Reserve. The Great Egg Harbor River is a significant waterway that flows through several municipalities in Atlantic County and Camden County.

== See also ==
- List of rivers of New Jersey
