= Salt Brook =

Tributary of the Passaic River, New Jersey, United States

Coordinates: 40°42′42″N 74°22′32″W

- Location of Salt Brook in New Jersey

Location
- Country: United States
- State: New Jersey
- County: Union County

Physical characteristics
- Source
  - location: Summit, New Jersey
- Mouth
  - location: Passaic River
- Length: 5 m (16 ft)

Salt Brook is a tributary of the Passaic River in Union County, New Jersey in the United States.

Salt Brook starts in Summit, New Jersey in the highlands south and west of Memorial Field. It then flows north and then west through Summit. It then flows through New Providence, New Jersey where it joins the Passaic River. Flooding is occasionally a problem along the Salt Brook, especially in the Memorial Field area and parts of New Providence. Local tradition is that the brook got its name when the locals dumped their salt into the brook to keep it out of the hands of advancing British soldiers during the American Revolutionary War.

The brook is only about 5 miles in length and is about 15 feet across in most locations. The western part of Summit and most of New Providence drain into the Passaic River via the Salt Brook.

There is an elementary school in New Providence located just north of the brook that is named after the brook, called Salt Brook Elementary School.

The Clearwater Detention Dam, one of the three high hazard dams in the area, is located along the Salt Brook in New Providence Borough.

== Hazards ==
=== Erosion ===
The Borough of New Providence has ranked erosion as a high hazard because of its imminent concern within the area. All portions of Salt Brook that have not been channelized and lined with concrete are subject to erosion. This specifically includes: Salt Brook from Pine Grove Avenue to Maple Terrace; Salt Brook from South Street to Passaic River; South Fork Salt Brook from headwaters to Salt Brook.

=== Flooding ===
The Central Branch and the South Fork of Salt Brook are tributaries of Salt Brook, which flows from the eastern side of the community. It intersects the ConRail tracks and traverses through the central part of the Borough before joining the Passaic River. The floodplains in the lower reach of Salt Brook are subject to inundation due to backflow from Passaic River floods. Conversely, the upper reach of Salt Brook and its tributaries experience flooding attributed to inadequate interior drainage and insufficient capacity of culverts beneath the railroad.

== Mitigation Plans ==
As of 2015, these mitigation plans which affect Salt Brook have been proposed

| Mitigation Action, Program, or Project | Hazard | Priority | Responsible Party | Project Duration | Estimated cost |
|---|---|---|---|---|---|
| Storm-water management system upgrade and improvement for Passaic Avenue, North of Springfield Avenue, All areas along Salt Brook Bank (South/West/Central) | Flood | High | New Providence OEM & DPW | 5–10 years | 10 Million |
| Channel improvements for Salt Brook | Flood | Low | New Providence Engineer | 1 year | $800,000 |

== See also ==
- List of rivers of New Jersey
