= Westecunk Creek =

River in New Jersey, United States

Coordinates: 39.666608°N 74.320233°W

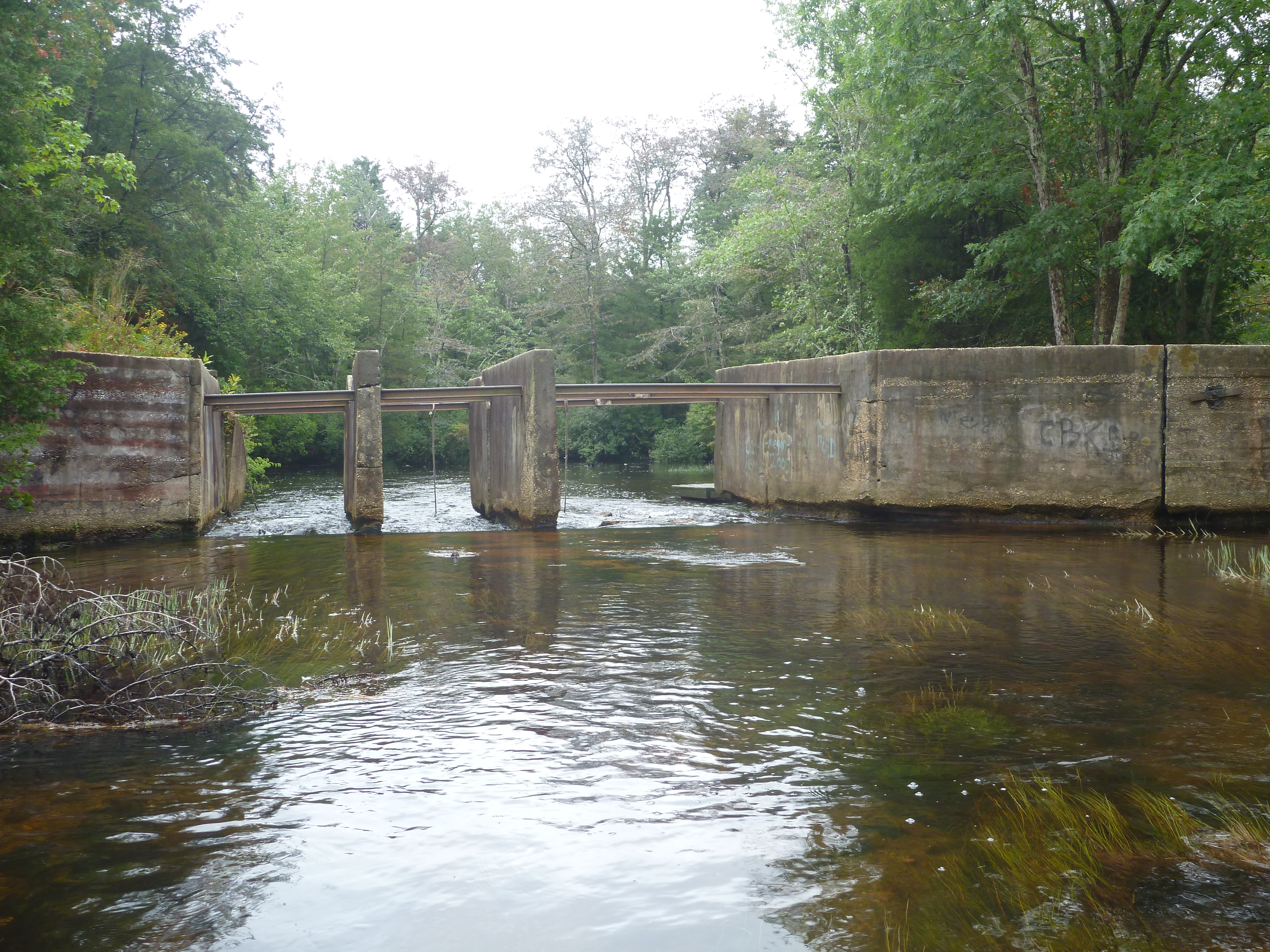
Westecunk Creek at Edwin B. Forsythe National Wildlife Refuge. The concrete barrier was removed in 2015.

Westecunk Creek is an 11.1-mile-long (17.9 km) tributary of Little Egg Harbor in southeastern New Jersey in the United States.

The name is derived from Lenape, meaning "place of fat meat".

Westecunk Creek originates in the Pine Barrens. Its mouth in West Creek(Eagleswood Township) is a few miles north of Tuckerton.

== Tributaries ==
- Uriah Branch
- Log Swamp Branch
- Governors Branch

== See also ==
- List of rivers of New Jersey
