= First River =

Coordinates: 40°45′07″N 74°11′00″W

Location
- Country: United States
- State: New Jersey
- Counties: Essex

Physical characteristics
- Source
  - location: Essex County, New Jersey, United States
- Mouth: Passaic River
  - location: Newark, Essex, New Jersey, United States

The First River, in the state of New Jersey in the United States, is a subterranean river and the first main tributary of the Passaic River encountered while travelling upstream from its mouth at Newark Bay.

Beginning at the confluence of Mill Brook and Branch Brook (near the present Skating Center in Branch Brook Park), the First River flowed parallel to Seventh Avenue and Clay Street, discharging into the Passaic River in the vicinity of the Clay Street bridge.

The First River was also known as Mill Brook, having supported several mills, including grist mills for the earliest settlers of Newark in the 17th century.

From 1863 to 1890 the brook was culvertised and now flows underground through two culverts, each six feet nine inches (206 cm) high by nine feet three inches (282 cm) wide until discharging into the Passaic. The brook once flowed through, and now flows under, what is now Branch Brook Park in the city of Newark.

== See also ==
- List of rivers of New Jersey
