= Mile Run (New Jersey) =

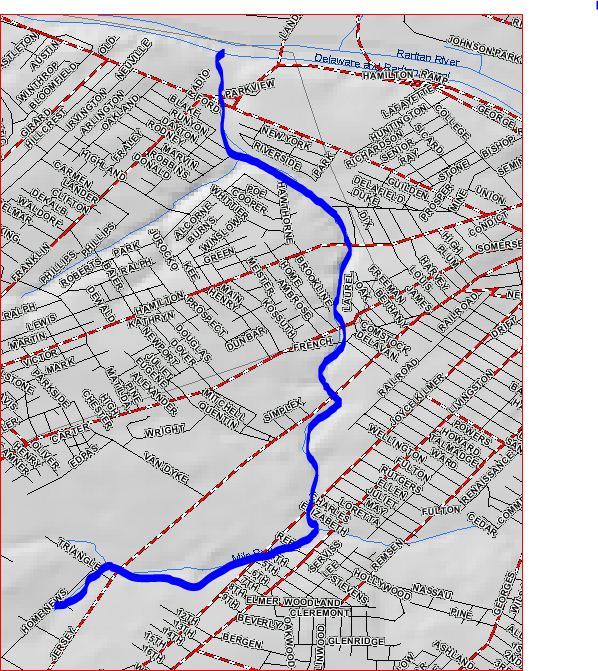
- Mile Run map

Location
- Country: United States

Physical characteristics
- Source
  - coordinates: 40°28′14″N 74°28′48″W
- Mouth
  - coordinates: 40°28′38″N 74°28′3″W
  - elevation: 16 ft (4.9 m)

Basin features
- Progression: Raritan River, Atlantic Ocean

Mile Run is a tributary of the Raritan River in New Brunswick, New Jersey, in the United States.

Its name is derived from the distance early surveyors estimated it was on the historic Kings Highway, Route 27, from the Raritan River crossing. Other streams, such as the Six Mile Run and the Nine Mile Run are named similarly.

== Course ==
Mile Run drains an area in the suburbs of New Brunswick. Its source is at 40°28′14″N 74°28′48″W, near the intersection of How Lane (CR-680) and Jersey Avenue (SR-91). It crosses Jersey Avenue and flows through a residential development near Livingston Avenue (SR-26). It then crosses some railroad tracks and crosses Jersey Ave. It crosses French Street (SR-27) one mile from the Raritan River, giving it its name. It flows between residential areas and crosses Hamilton Street. It joins a tributary from the south and crosses Easton Avenue and Landing Lane before draining into the Raritan River at 40°28′38″N 74°28′3″W.

Mile Run forms part of the boundary between Somerset and Middlesex counties.

== Accessibility ==
Mile Run flows through a heavily developed area, making it easily accessible.

== Animal life ==
Mile Run has stress on it because of the city surrounding it, possibly harming the aquatic life.

== See also ==
- List of rivers of New Jersey
