= Oranoaken Creek =

River in New Jersey, United States

Coordinates: 39.28873°N 75.141069°W

Oranoaken Creek is a 10.0-mile-long (16.1 km) tributary of Delaware Bay in southern New Jersey in the United States.

== See also ==
- List of rivers of New Jersey
