= Canoe Brook =

Stream in New Jersey, United States

Coordinates: 40°47′11″N 74°18′43″W

Canoe Brook is a tributary of the Passaic River in the U.S. state of New Jersey.

It runs behind several municipal buildings in Livingston such as the police station and town hall. Its average depth is about 6 inches (15.2 cm) deep, but its water level can rise to well more than a foot (30.5 cm) during heavy rains. In the early 1980s a flood claimed the lives of three kids rafting in a flood. The flood waters went nearly to the bridge on Northfield, completely over the bridge at East Hobart Gap and finally went across East Hobart Gap Road by Burnett Street, where it flooded a home. The home was torn down shortly thereafter. In the mid 1980s the brook was reconstructed of concrete and stone from the Swan Street area to East Hobart Gap Road.

During Hurricane Floyd in 1999, the river overflowed its banks, well over three meters in some places, as the volume of water was too great to pass through the culverts under the residential bridges, flowed over them and through nearby homes as well.

The brook is also a historic waterway as a sawmill alongside the brook near what is now Northfield Avenue. It was used as an early power source by the town's early settlers in the 19th century. Also, one of the oldest buildings in Livingston, the Force Hill homestead, lies only a short distance upstream.

== See also ==
- List of rivers of New Jersey
