= English Creek (New Jersey) =

Coordinates: 39.348999°N 74.671486°W

National Wild and Scenic Rivers System
- Designated: October 27, 1992

English Creek is a 6.0-mile-long (9.7 km) tributary of the Great Egg Harbor River in southeast New Jersey in the United States.

== See also ==
- List of rivers of New Jersey
