= Black Brook (Whippany River tributary) =

River in New Jersey, United States

Coordinates: 40.794007°N 74.405685°W

Black Brook is a tributary of the Whippany River that flows near Morristown Regional Airport in Morristown, Morris County, New Jersey, in the United States.

== See also ==
- List of rivers of New Jersey
