= Carters Brook (New Jersey) =

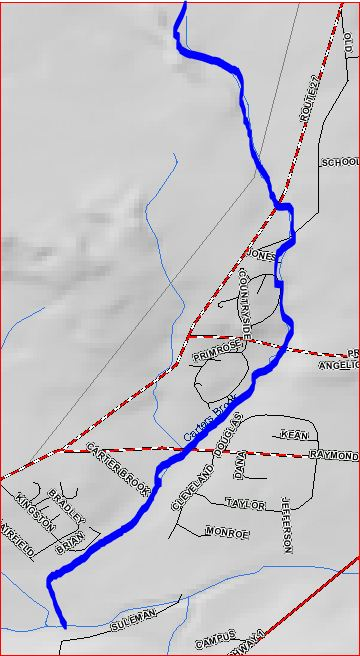
- Carters Brook map

Location
- Country: United States

Physical characteristics
- Source
  - coordinates: 40°24′23″N 74°35′43″W
- Mouth
  - coordinates: 40°22′14″N 74°36′9″W
  - elevation: 66 ft (20 m)

Basin features
- Progression: Heathcote Brook, Millstone River, Raritan River, Atlantic Ocean

Carters Brook, also known as Carter Brook, is a branch of the Heathcote Brook in Somerset and Middlesex counties, New Jersey in the United States.

== Course ==
The Carters Brook source is at 40°24′23″N 74°35′43″W, near the intersection of Route 518 and Route 27. It flows generally south, crossing Promenade Boulevard and Raymond Road before draining into the Heathcote Brook at 40°22′14″N 74°36′9″W.

== Accessibility ==
The Carters Brook is accessible by several roads.

== Sister tributary ==
- Heathcote Brook Branch

== See also ==
- List of rivers of New Jersey
