= Great Brook (New Jersey) =

River in New Jersey, United States

Coordinates: 40.705379°N 74.517933°W

Great Brook is a tributary of the Passaic River in the U.S. state of New Jersey.

Great Brook passes through the borough of Bernardsville.

== See also ==
- List of rivers of New Jersey
