= Mount Pleasant, Hunterdon County, New Jersey =

Populated place in Hunterdon County, New Jersey, US

Mount Pleasant, New Jersey
- Unincorporated community
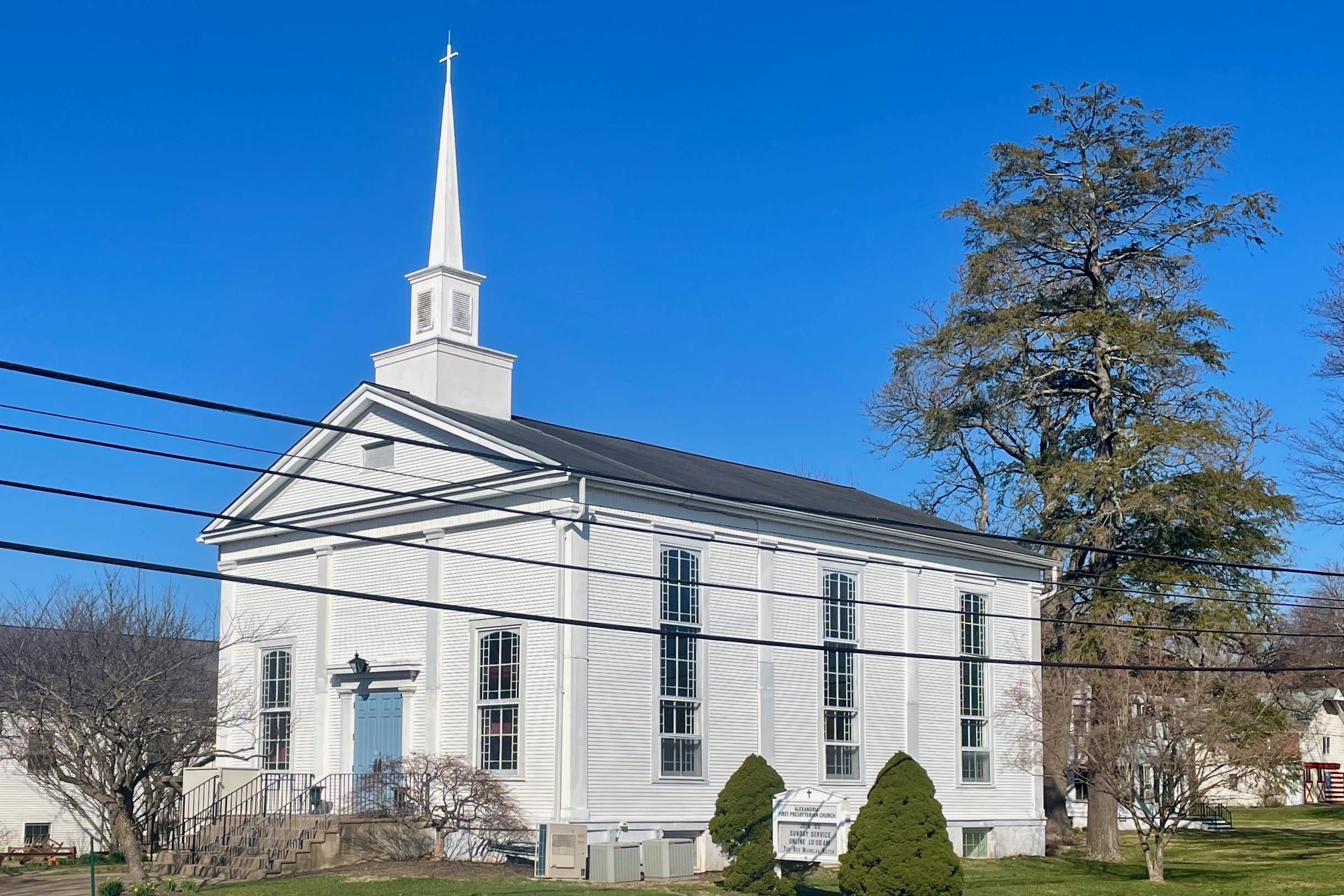
- Alexandria First Presbyterian Church

- Location within Hunterdon County, New Jersey Location within New Jersey Location within the United States
- Coordinates: 40°34′48″N 75°3′0″W
- Country: United States
- State: New Jersey
- County: Hunterdon
- Township: Alexandria
- Elevation: 292 ft (89 m)
- Time zone: UTC−05:00 (Eastern (EST))
  - Summer (DST): UTC−04:00 (EDT)
- GNIS feature ID: 878576

Mount Pleasant is an unincorporated community located along County Route 519 on the border of Alexandria Township and Holland Township, in Hunterdon County, New Jersey. The Mount Pleasant Historic District was listed on the National Register of Historic Places in 1987.

== History ==
The Presbyterian church was organized c. 1752 and worshipped in a log meeting house. The Mount Pleasant school was started before 1790. By the 1880s, the community had a post office, two stores, a mill, a blacksmith and a tavern.

== Historic district ==
- Mount Pleasant Historic District
- U.S. National Register of Historic Places
- U.S. Historic district
- New Jersey Register of Historic Places
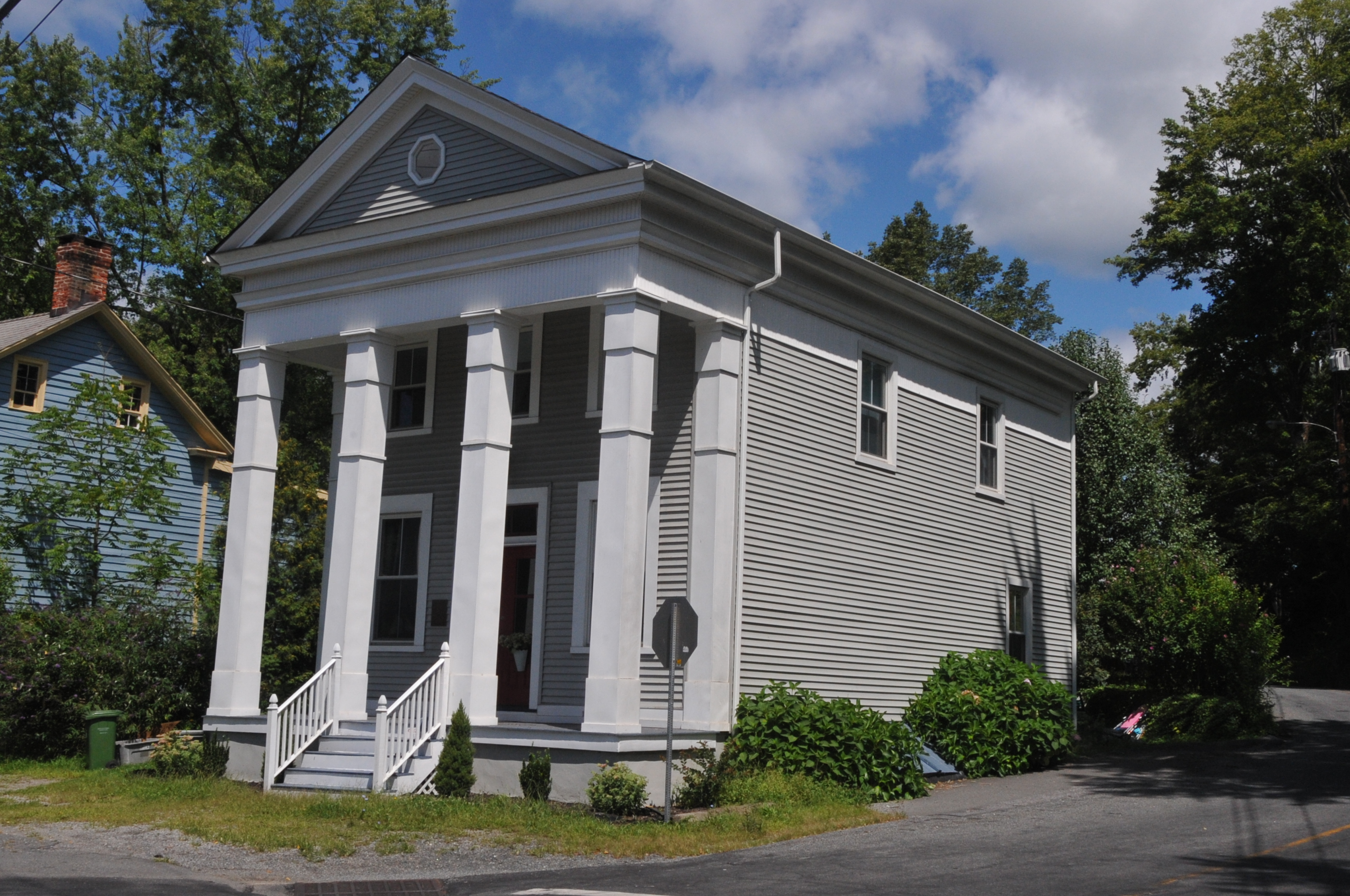
- Mount Pleasant General Store
- Location: County Route 519 and Rick Road
- Area: 59 acres (24 ha)
- Built: 1800
- Architectural style: Greek Revival, Late Victorian, Federal
- NRHP reference No.: 87002012
- NJRHP No.: 1561

Significant dates
- Added to NRHP: November 16, 1987
- Designated NJRHP: October 5, 1987

The Mount Pleasant Historic District is a 59-acre (24 ha) historic district encompassing the community along County Route 519 (Little York–Mount Pleasant Road) and Rick Road. It was added to the National Register of Historic Places on November 16, 1987 for its significance in agriculture, architecture, commerce, settlement, and industry. It includes 34 contributing buildings.

The Presbyterian Church, built in 1843, and the general store, built in the 1860s, feature vernacular Greek Revival style.

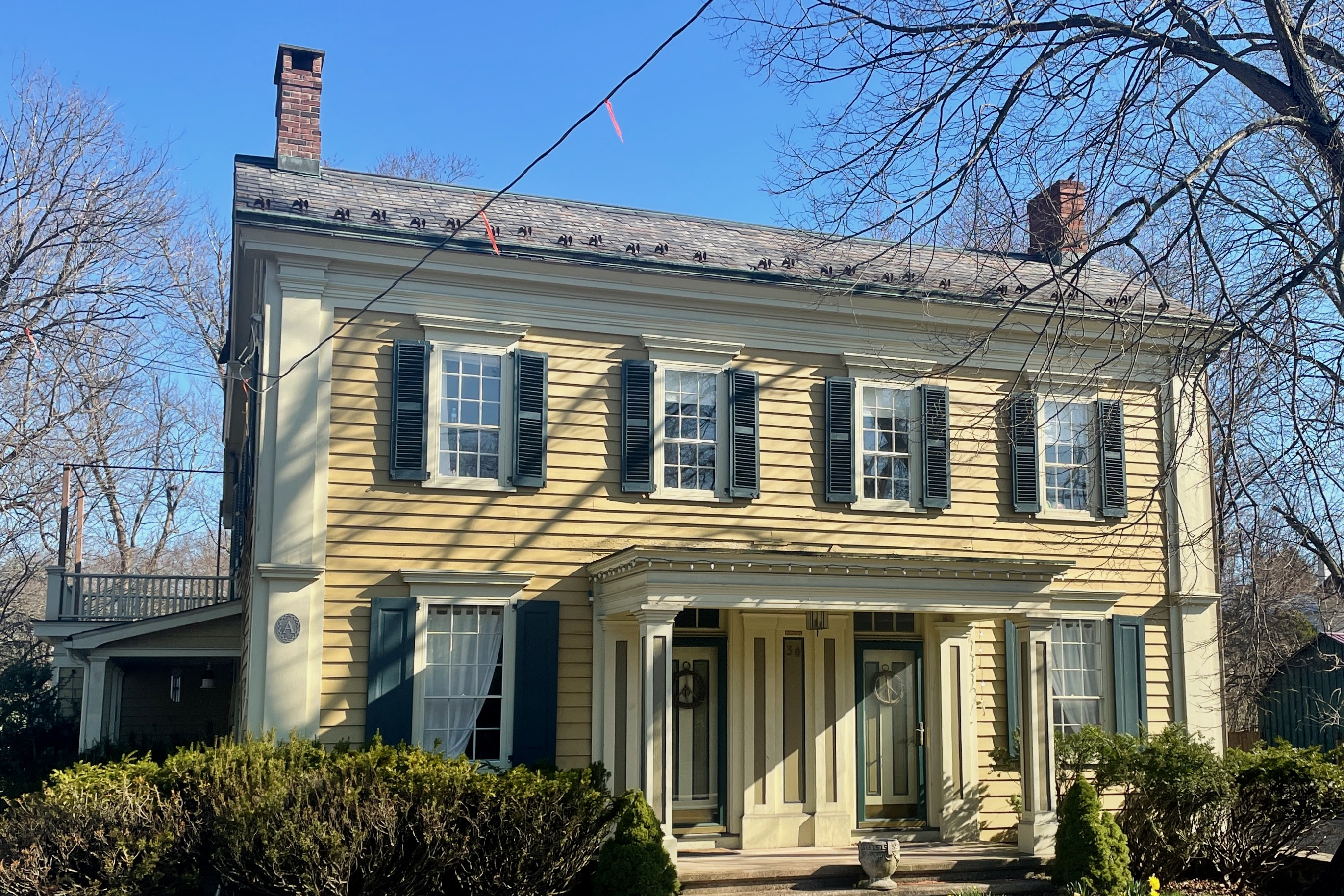
Vernacular Greek Revival house

== See also ==
- National Register of Historic Places listings in Hunterdon County, New Jersey
