= Heards Brook =

Stream in Middlesex County, New Jersey, U.S.

Coordinates: 40°33′23″N 74°16′05″W

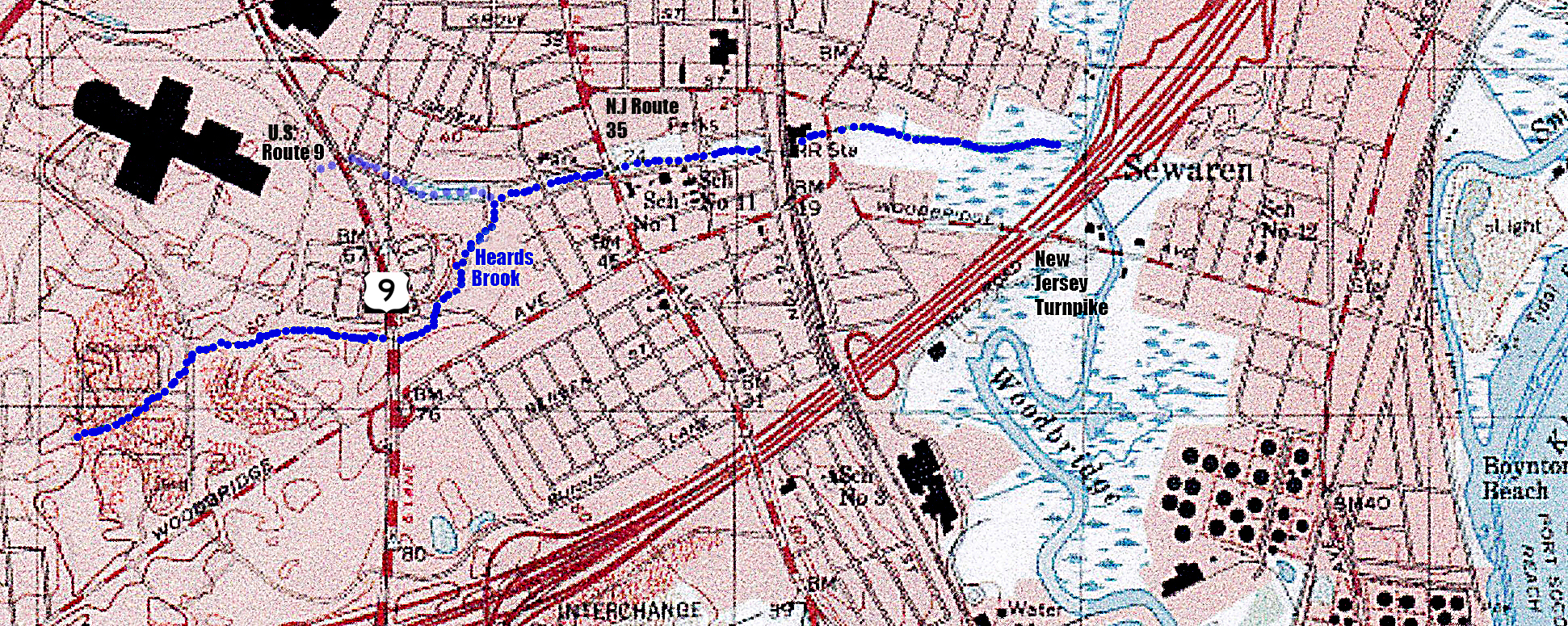
Map of Heards Brook

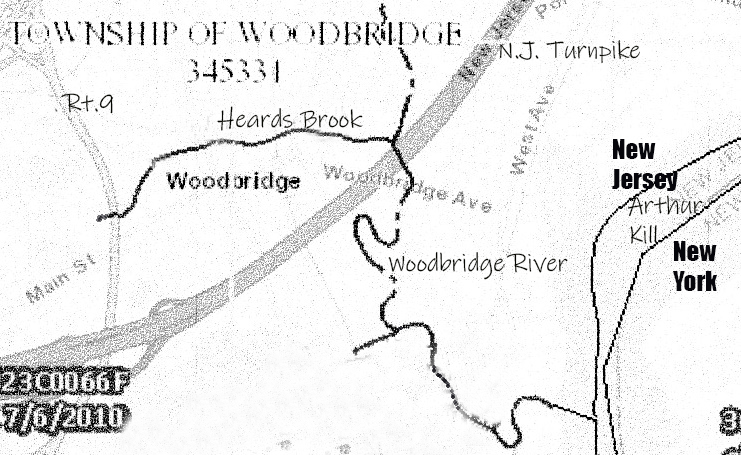
FEMA map, Heards Brook and Woodbridge River

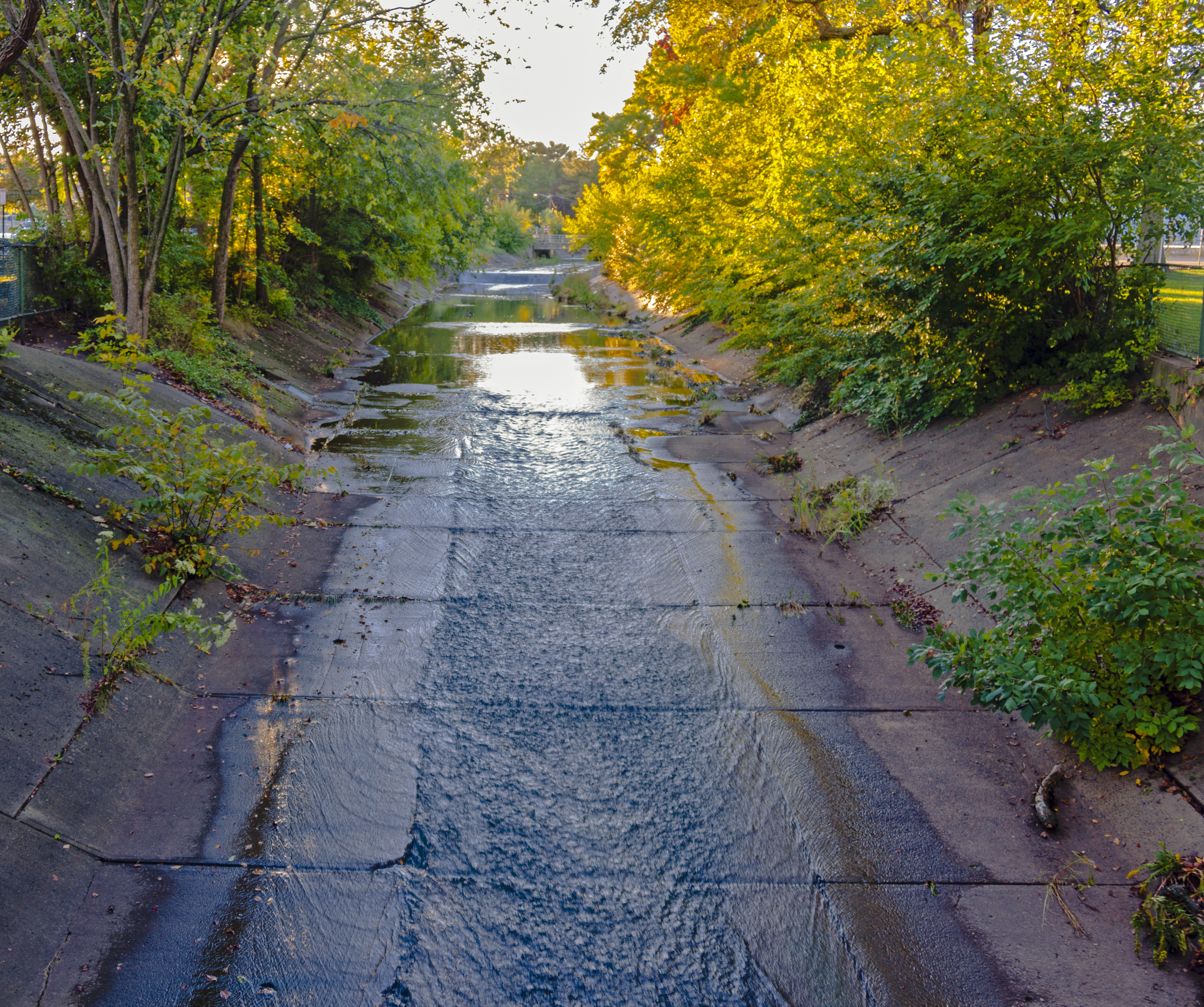
Heards Brook near the Woodbridge train station

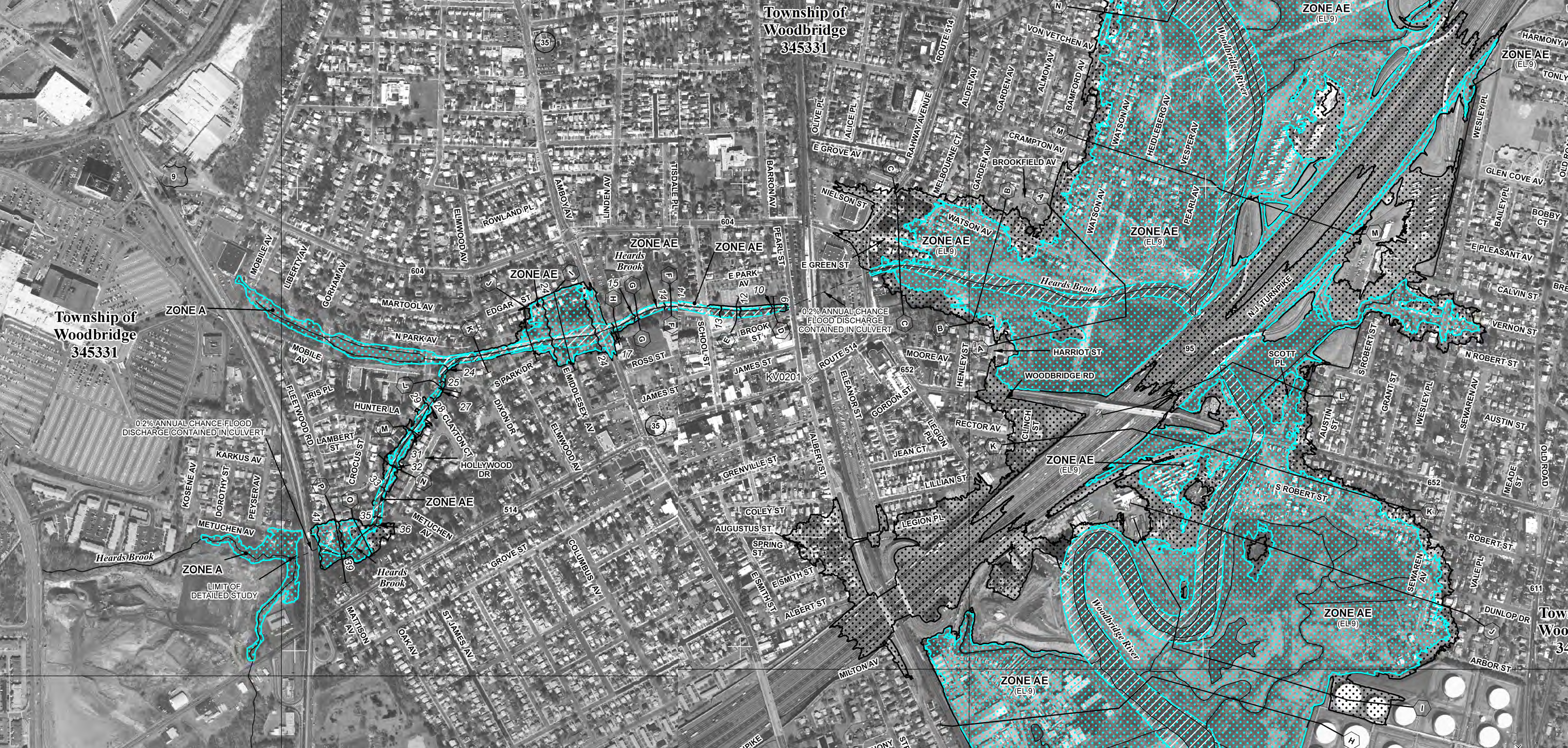
Heards Brook 100 year flood projection

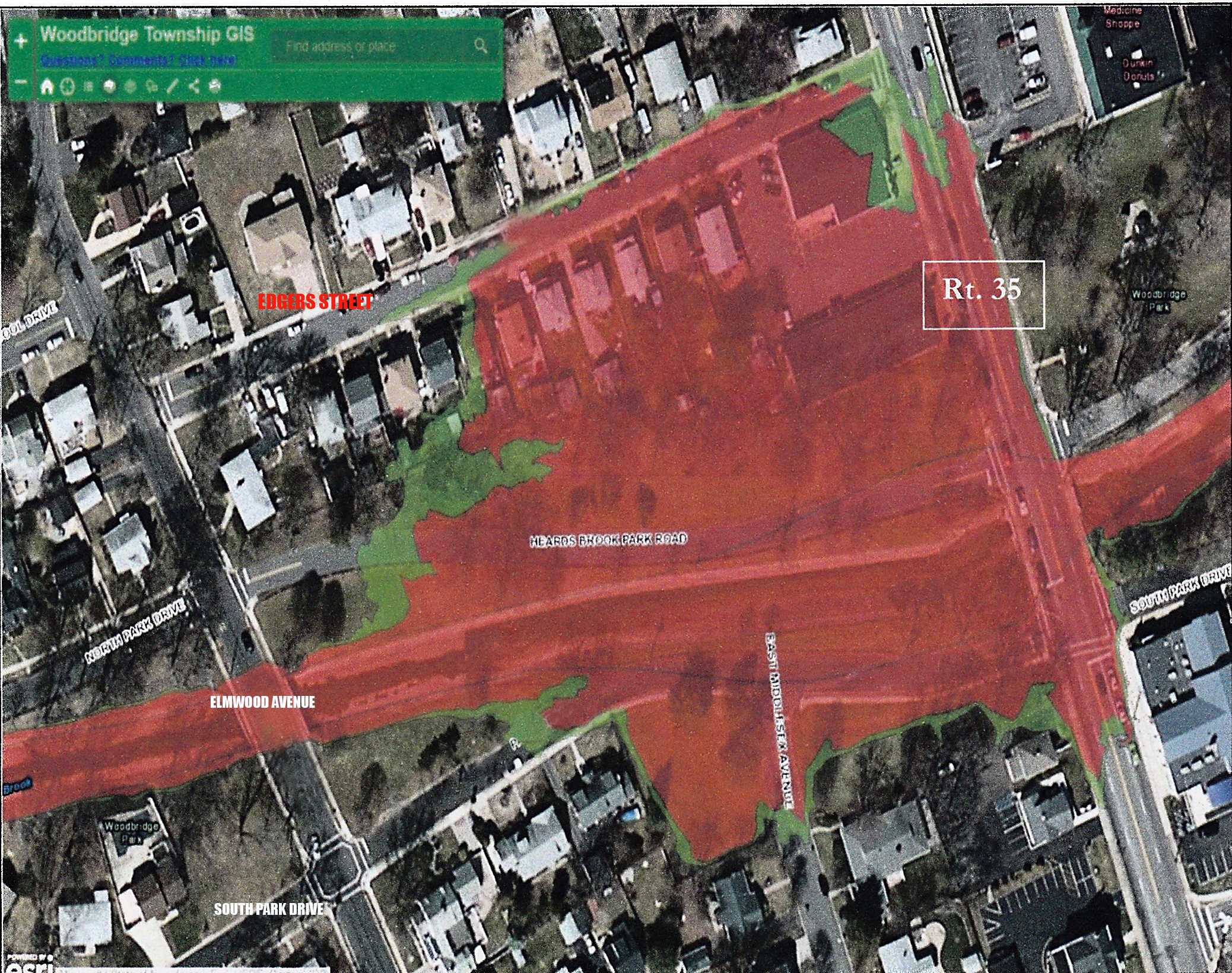
Area vulnerable to fluvial flooding along Heards Brook near Elmwood Avenue and Route 35 flooding

Heards Brook is a stream in Woodbridge Township, Middlesex County, New Jersey, United States.

The brook has a watershed of about 135 acres, flowing eastward through Woodbridge for 1.8 miles and draining into Woodbridge Creek, which flows southward into Arthur Kill. There is a history of tidal flooding along this creek and its tributary Heards Brook. The most extreme flooding occurred during Superstorm Sandy, with a high water mark in Woodbridge Creek of 12 feet. Where the brook enters the creek there is only a six-foot elevation above sea level. Heards Brook has been described, also, as having a "high flow, flashy nature"; in addition to tidal flooding, fluvial flooding is also common. The land is relatively impervious, and flooding is exacerbated by steep slopes, urban cover and outflow block. The culvert size at the Route 35 crossing is 12 × 6 feet; reconstruction of this culvert was the most expensive and leading priority of the Woodbridge post-Sandy recovery planning report. Nevertheless, back-flow from this location continues to cause upstream flooding. Flooding will occur as far west as Elmwood Avenue during a two-year storm. Prolonged coastal storms (nor'easters), which combine tidal and fluvial flooding, along with flow constrictions, cause an increase in the duration of flooding of Heards Brook, which may last for days before water levels subside. Decadal events have the potential for four-foot flooding in lowest developed areas. After Sandy, Woodbridge removed multiple residential properties in the flood-hazard areas adjoining Heards Brook near its debouchement into Woodbridge Creek. Frequency of flooding in the area has increased over time, as residential areas moved into previous marshland, decreasing the ability of the land to absorb excess water. When the Sandy came it was "characterized as a tsunami-like water wall", destroying adjoining homes. This area, near the confluence of the two streams, has become a part of the restoration plan for the riparian environment. Woodbridge's actions and plans have been called a "slow motion evacuation from climate change." As people move out of flood hazard areas, they will be replaced by a "flood plain forest of native trees, shrubs and grass".

In the center of Woodbridge, Heards Brook passes through Heards Brook Park. Described as "the most preferred tourist attraction in Woodbridge", it has a wooded area, picnic tables, tree-lined stone pathways, basketball courts and "stunning views of the brook". The Rutgers floodplain plan is to integrate smaller park areas of eastern Heards Brook into the larger areas with a bioswale.

Around 1860 Woodbridge became a hub of the brickmaking industry. Large scale excavation was started in the town for clay; Woodbridge clay was used for making fire bricks, able to withstand heat of greater than 2000°. Heards Brook was used as a marker delineating the location of various pits.
