= Lubbers Run =

River in New Jersey, United States

Coordinates: 40°55′39″N 74°43′30″W

Lubbers Run is a creek running through Byram Township and Sparta in Sussex County in northwestern New Jersey. It is a tributary of the Musconetcong River, joining near Waterloo Village. The Lubbers Run Preserve is a 90-acre (36 ha) nature preserve in Byram Township.

== See also ==
- List of rivers of New Jersey
