= Stevenson Brook =

River in New Jersey, United States

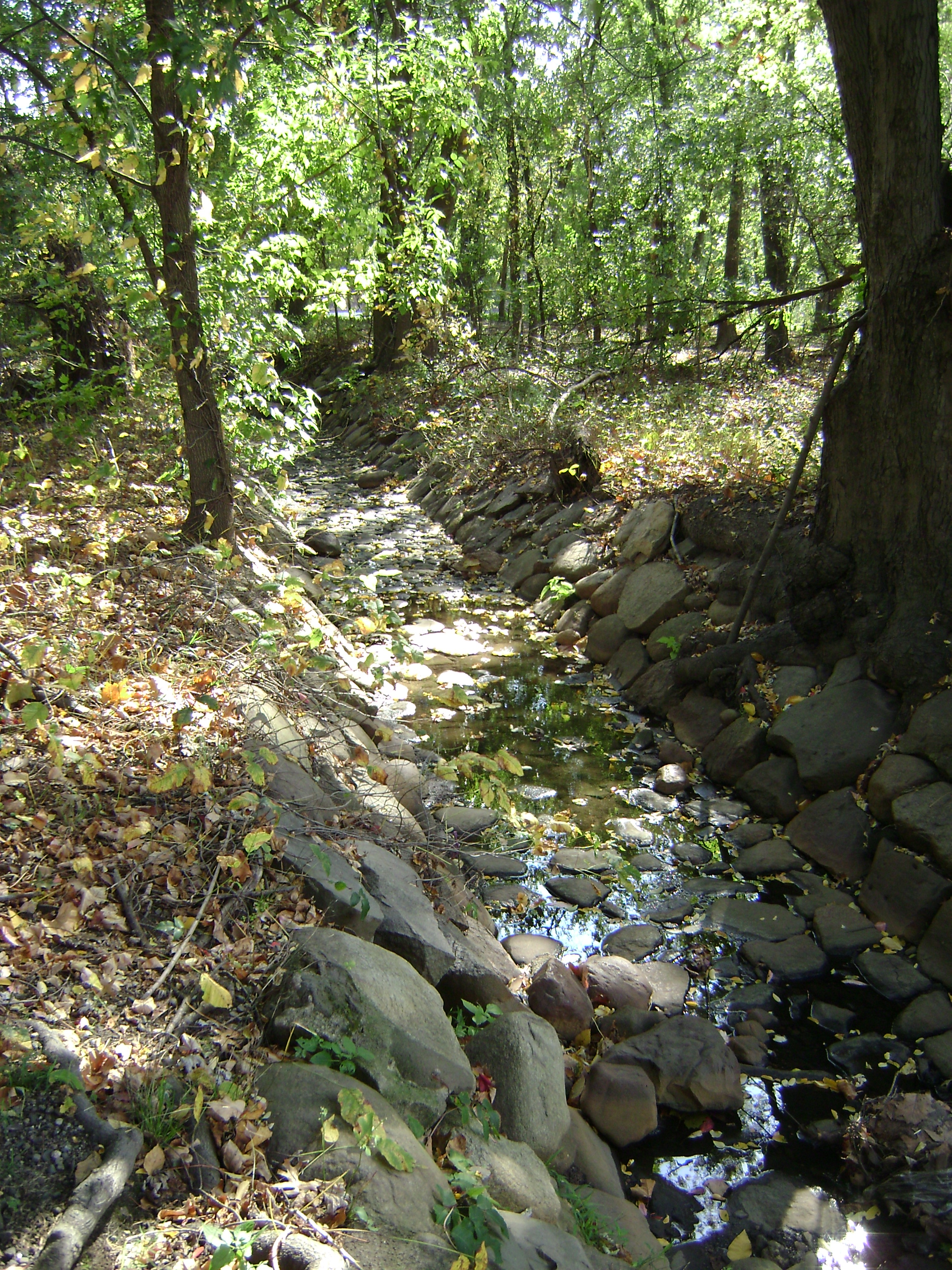
Stevenson Brook in Hawthorne where it flows through the Wagaraw Sports Complex

Stevenson Brook is a tributary of the Passaic River in Hawthorne, Passaic County, New Jersey in the United States.

Stevenson Brook is one half mile long and once flowed unobstructed from the Diamond Bridge Avenue area of Hawthorne south to the Passaic River, but a significant section of the brook was culvertized early in the twentieth century. Two portions of the brook now remain intact at the surface, running from Diamond Bridge Avenue to Royal Avenue and from Wagaraw Road to the Passaic River. The section south of Wagaraw Road is crossed by a pedestrian bridge linking a parking lot to a local sports complex.

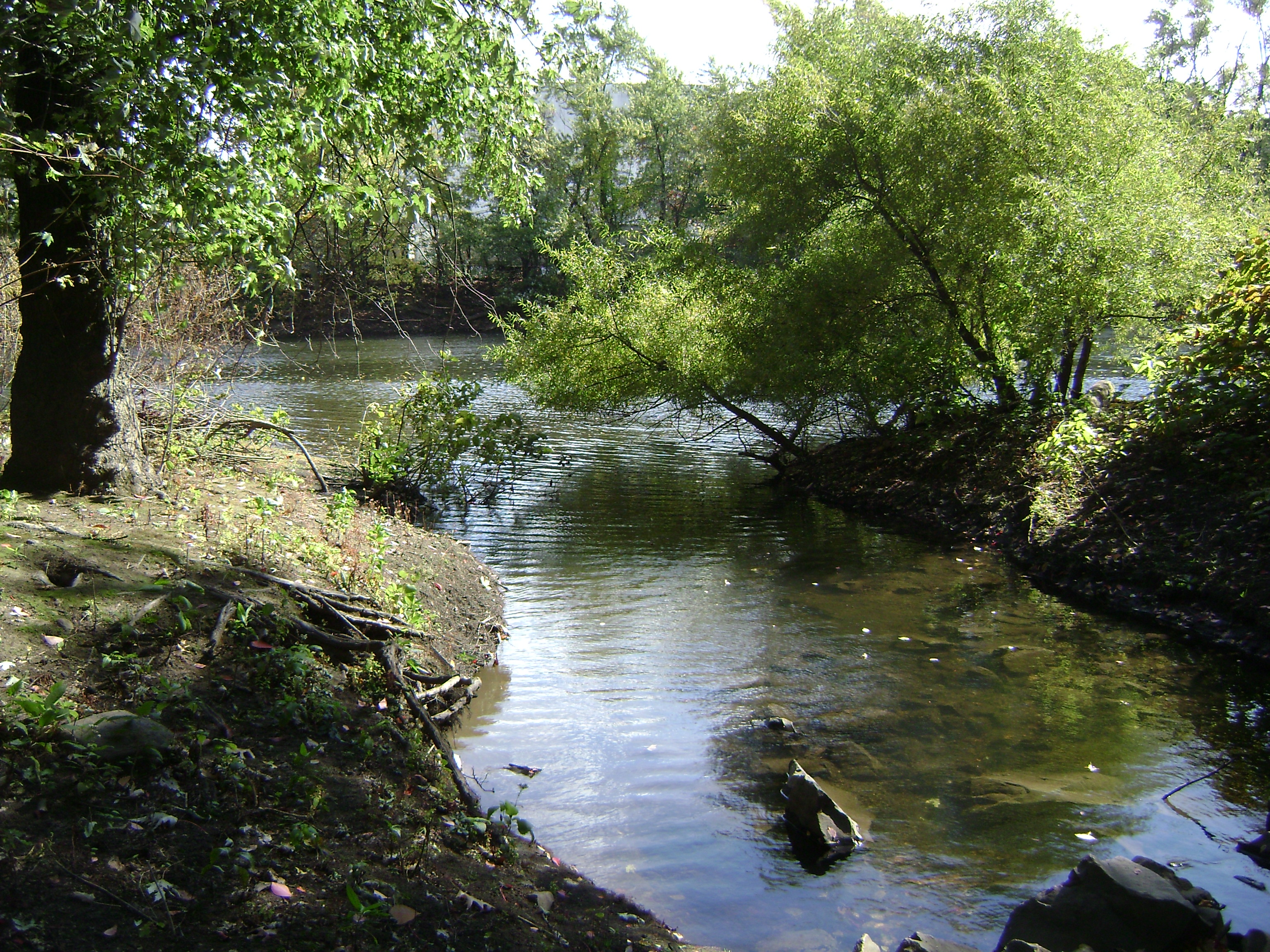
Stevenson Brook in Hawthorne where it joins the Passaic River

There is a residential development along Stevenson Brook called Diamond Brook Hollow. The name of the development seems to be derived from a local tendency to refer to Stevenson Brook as Diamond Brook, because it is crossed by Diamond Bridge Avenue. However, the real Diamond Brook (40°56′47″N 74°08′32″W) lies about a half mile to the east in the towns of Glen Rock and Fair Lawn.

A small stream that once flowed parallel to the Passaic River known as De Gray Brook connected into Stevenson Brook just north of its junction with the Passaic River. De Gray Brook was completely filled in with the construction of the Wagaraw Sports Complex.

== See also ==
- List of rivers of New Jersey
