= South River (Great Egg Harbor River tributary) =

Coordinates: 39°26′23″N 74°45′26″W

National Wild and Scenic River
- Designated: October 27, 1992

The South River is a tributary of the Raritan river, in Middlesex County, New Jersey, in the United States.

The South River, is formed by the confluence of Matchaponix Brook and the Manalapan Brook. Flowing down into Devoe lake and Duhernal Lake on the Spotswood, Oldbridge border. Joining the Raritan River approximately midway between New Brunswick and Perth Amboy.[3]

- List of rivers of New Jersey
