= Smith Creek (Woodbridge Township, New Jersey) =

Stream in New Jersey, United States

Coordinates: 40°32′59″N 74°15′17″W

Map of Smith Creek

Smith Creek is a stream in Woodbridge Township, New Jersey, United States, emptying into the Arthur Kill 0.5 miles (0.80 km) north of the Woodbridge River. It was named for John Smith, one of the group who in 1667 purchased the land parcel from Governor Philip Carteret that became Woodbridge. Its navigable length is 0.6 miles (0.97 km), and there are nine marinas in that stretch. The creek draws less than 3 to 3.5 feet (0.91 to 1.07 m) of water, limiting its use to shallow draft boats. Dredging of the creek in the region of the marinas was a 2013 priority for Woodbridge Township after Hurricane Sandy. The creek is a "minor freshwater tributary" to Arthur Kill, with higher flows in the spring, and less in late summer and fall. Public Service Enterprise Group has a generating station 0.6 miles (0.97 km) north of the mouth of Smith Creek. One mile north of the mouth is an oil refining and storage facility. In 2013 "corrective action" was taken against the Hess Corporation, after selling the property, for soil and groundwater contamination, including arsenic, lead and benzene. An old reference states:

Transatlantic sailing vessels once docked in Woodbridge, but silt from the clay pits converted Smith Creek into an inconsequential brook. Until the 1880s Woodbridge was a fashionable watering place. The Arthur Kill is now so spoiled by oil and sewage even gulls avoid it.
