= Marshes Creek =

Tidal tributary in Linden, New Jersey, US

Coordinates: 40°36′03″N 74°13′15″W

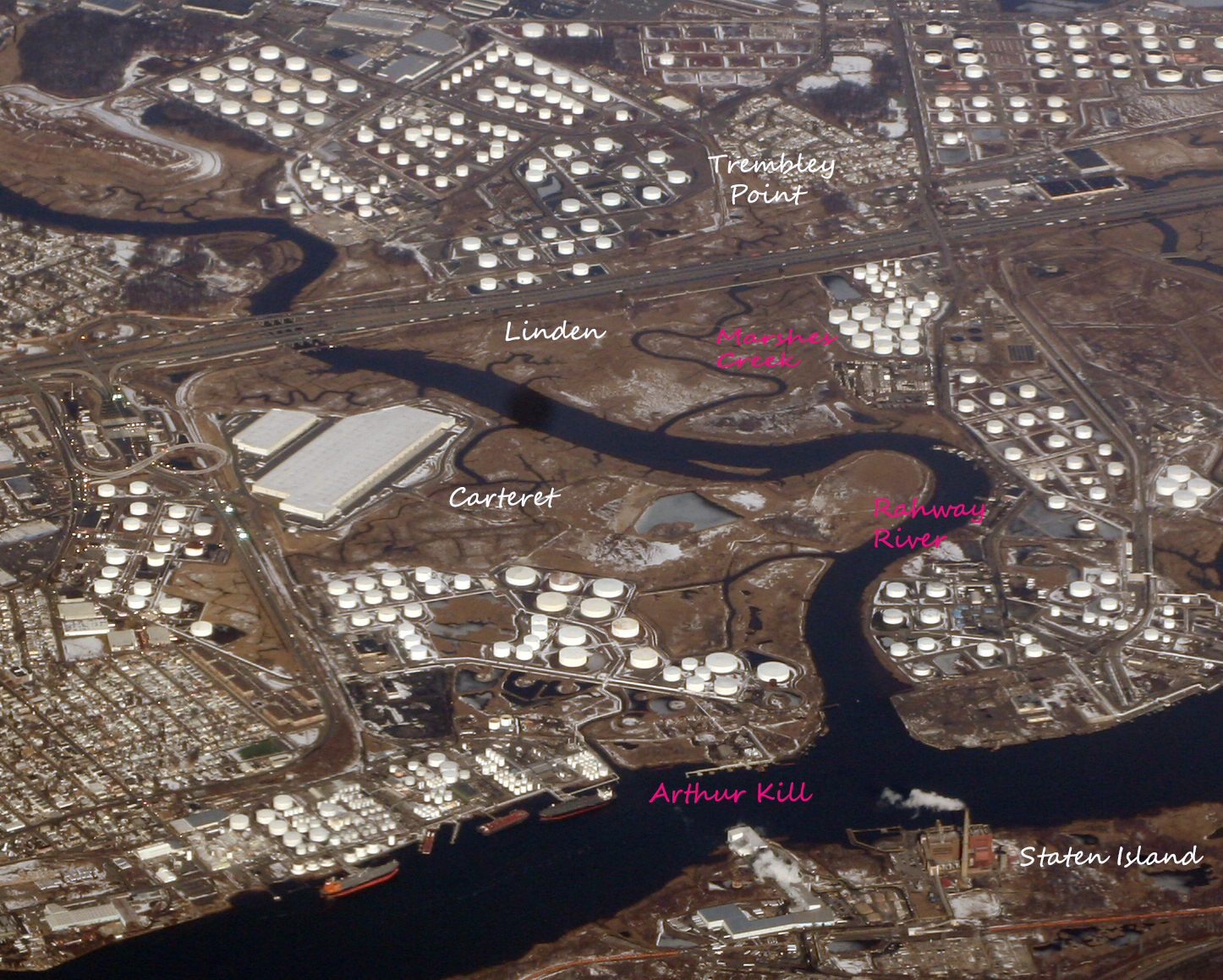
Marshes Creek, tributary of Rahway River

Marshes Creek is a tidal tributary of the Rahway River in Linden, New Jersey, United States.

The land surrounding Marshes Creek is largely industrial except for the residential Tremley Point neighborhood at the headwaters of Marshes Creek. Severe flooding from the creek is common; rainfall is one factor, with impaired storm water runoff and insufficient conveyance capacity The area is also susceptible to tidal flooding, exacerbated by low lying elevation, sea level rise and loss of historic coastal wetlands.

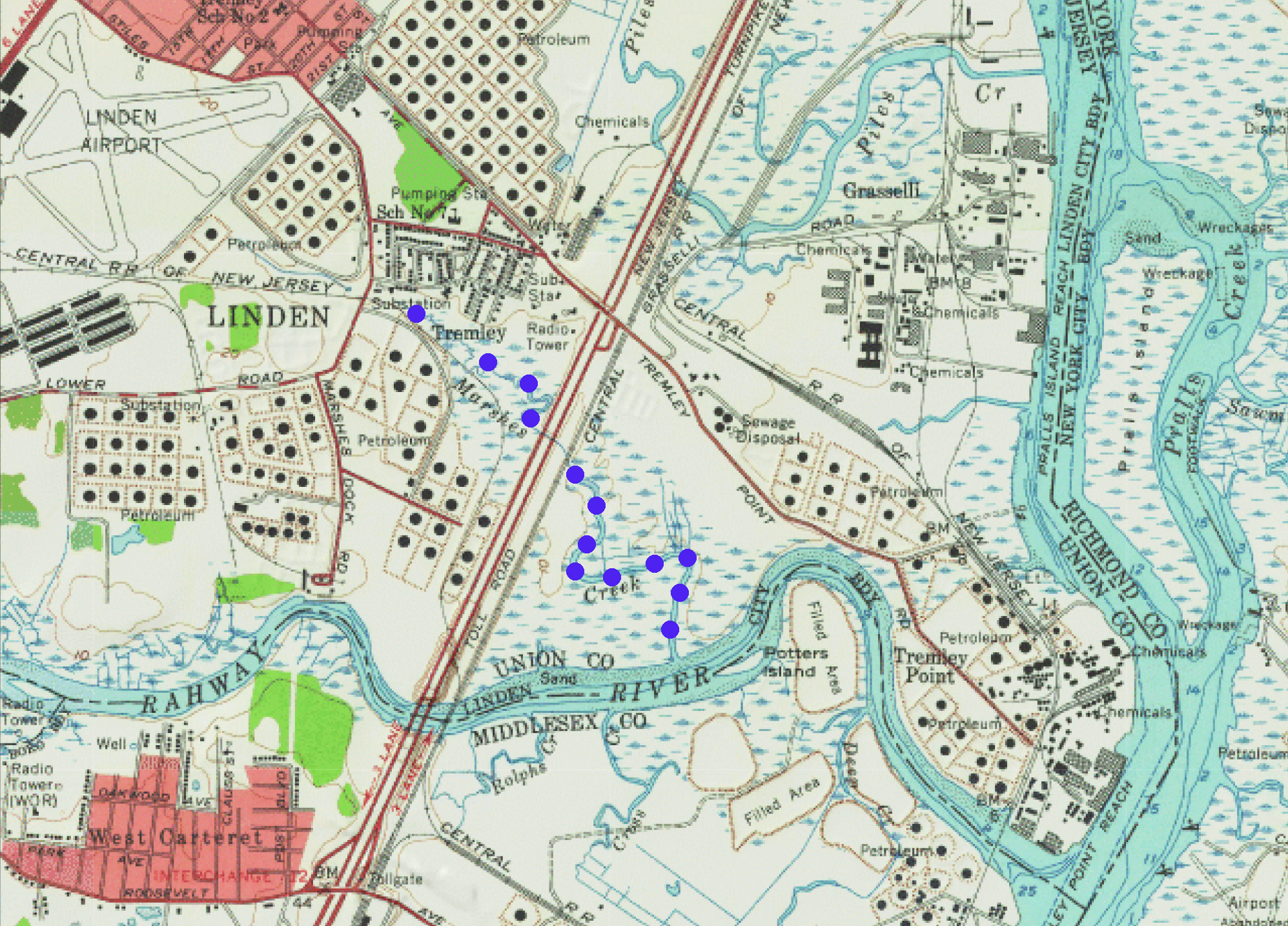
A map of Marshes Creek, Linden, New Jersey; based on U.S.G.S map

In 2012 Hurricane Sandy produced a 15-foot tidal surge in Tremley Point. Homes and roads were destroyed and hazardous material washed up. Beginning in 2014, using HUD funding, New Jersey started buying out Tremley Point homes in flood prone areas. "Where retreat is the only option," demolished homes will be replaced by open spaces. The plan is to restore 190 acres of degraded tidal salt marshes and floodplain forest and meadow, so they might be a buffer against storm surges
