= Nishisakawick Creek =

Tributary in New Jersey, United States

Coordinates: 40.523736°N 75.063562°W

The Nishisakawick Creek is a 9.6-mile-long (15.4 km) tributary of the Delaware River in Hunterdon County, New Jersey in the United States.

The headwaters of the Nishisackawick begins in forested wetlands in Alexandria Township and it flows through Camp Marudy Lake, past Camp Marudy, and through Everittstown on its way southwest past farms and developed land joins the Delaware at Frenchtown.

The Little Nishisakawick springs from wetlands in Kingwood Township and flows approximately 4 miles southwest through mostly agricultural land gently dropping to the Delaware River.

Nishisackawick is thought to originate from a Unami word — neschi-sakquik, meaning “double outlet or mouth".

== Variant names ==
According to the Geographic Names Information System, the Nishisakawick Creek has also been known historically as:

- Mississackaway Creek
- Nischisacowick Creek

== See also ==
- List of rivers of New Jersey
