= Sucker Brook (Lawrence Brook tributary) =

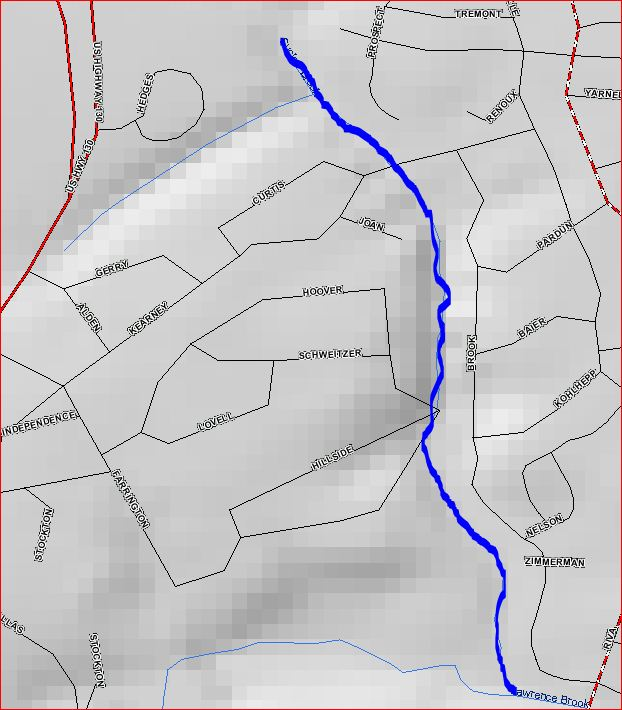
- Map of Sucker Brook

Location
- Country: United States

Physical characteristics
- Source
  - coordinates: 40°27′40″N 74°27′09″W
- Mouth
  - coordinates: 40°26′58″N 74°26′52″W
  - elevation: 23 ft (7.0 m)

Basin features
- Progression: Lawrence Brook, Raritan River, Atlantic Ocean

Sucker Brook is a tributary of Lawrence Brook in central New Jersey in the United States.

== Course ==
The source of Sucker Brook is several pools located in a housing development at 40°27′40″N 74°27′09″W. It travels in a pipe under Route 130, and then runs between a housing development. It drains into Lawrence Brook at 40°26′58″N 74°26′52″W near Westons Mill Pond, a dammed section of Lawrence Brook.

== Sister tributaries ==
- Beaverdam Brook
- Great Ditch
- Ireland Brook
- Oakeys Brook
- Sawmill Brook
- Terhune Run
- Unnamed Brook in Rutgers Gardens, unofficially named Doc Brook
- Unnamed Brook in Rutgers' Helyar Woods

== History ==
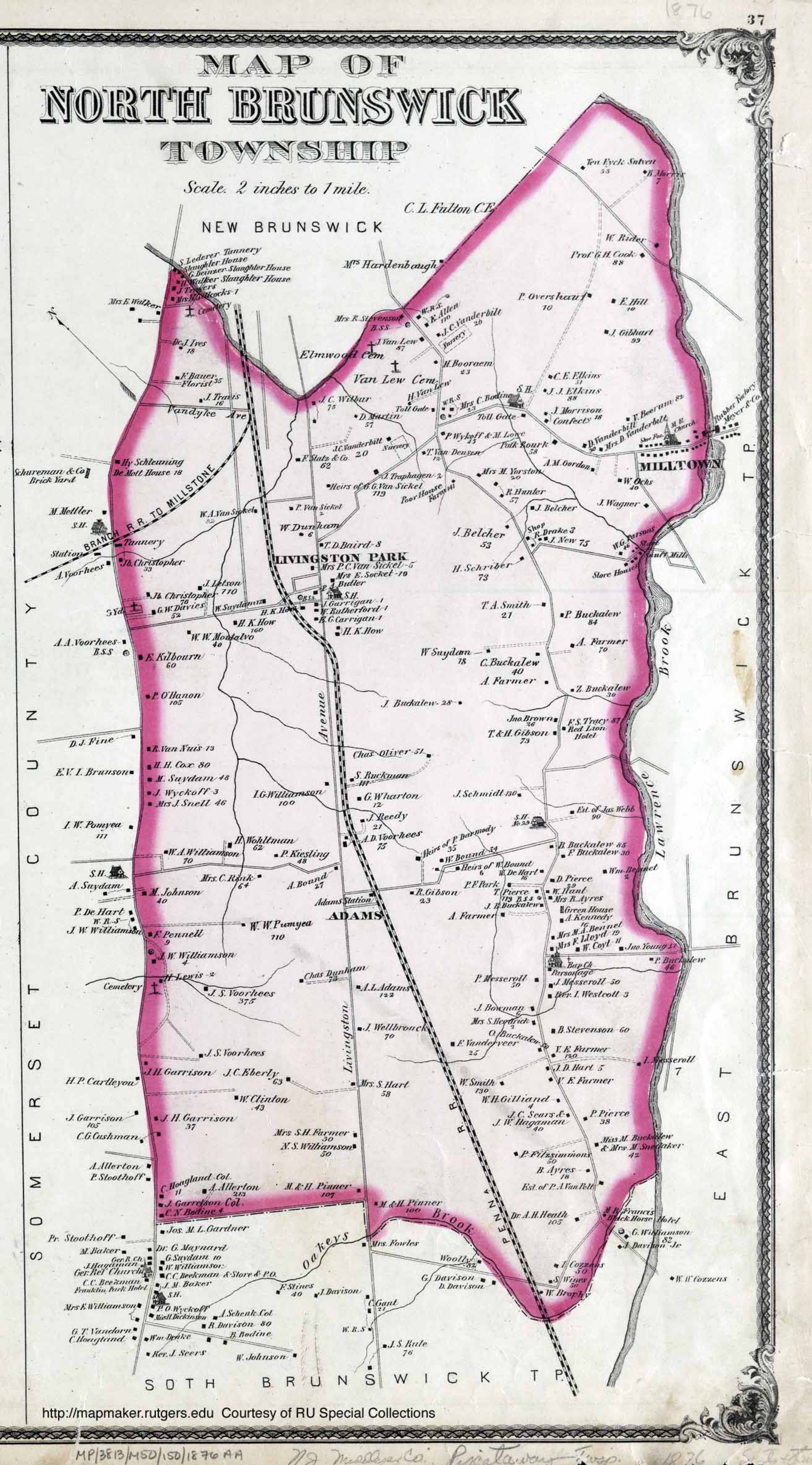
Map of North Brunswick, New Jersey, 1876. Sucker Brook flows to Lawrence Brook below Milltown at the upper right.

An 1876 map of North Brunswick shows that Sucker Brook at one time transversed the present day U.S. 1, Milltown Road, 4th, 3rd, 2nd, 1st Avenues, and Allgair Avenue, and ended near Nassau Street east of George's Road.

== See also ==
- List of rivers of New Jersey
