= Sawmill Brook (New Jersey) =

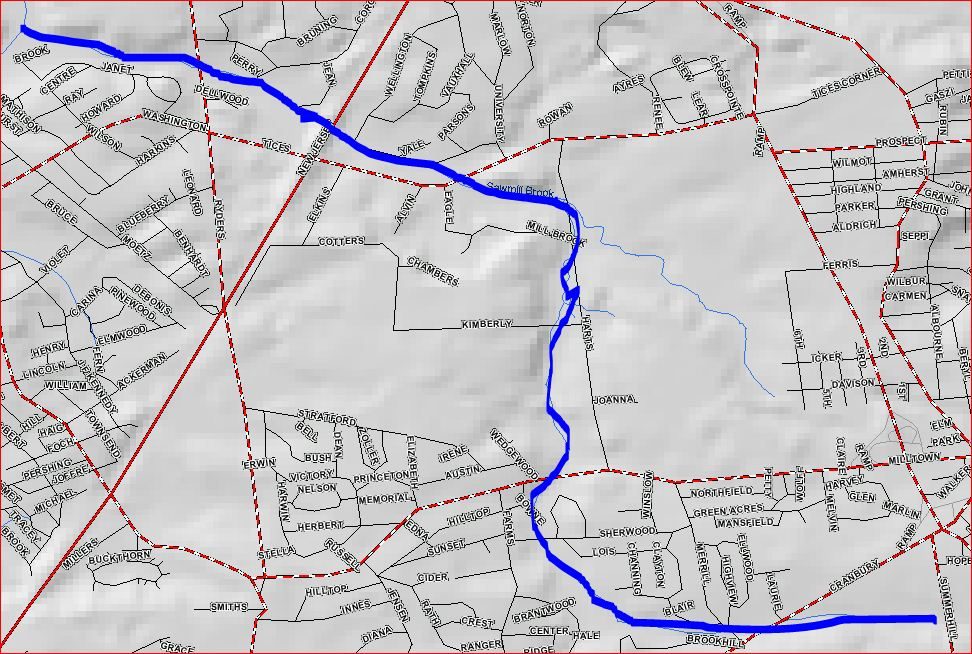
- Sawmill Brook map

Location
- Country: United States

Physical characteristics
- Source
  - coordinates: 40°26′35″N 74°23′58″W
- Mouth
  - coordinates: 40°27′34″N 74°25′53″W
  - elevation: 20 ft (6.1 m)

Basin features
- Progression: Lawrence Brook, Raritan River, Atlantic Ocean

Sawmill Brook is a tributary of Lawrence Brook in northwestern East Brunswick, New Jersey in the United States.

== Course ==
The Sawmill Brook's official source is at 40°26′35″N 74°23′58″W. It runs through the industrialized section between Harts Lane and Route 18. It then crosses Harts Lane and runs through Tices Lane Park. Another branch from the south joins it, and it crosses Tices Lane. It crosses the New Jersey Turnpike and Ryders Lane, and drains into Westons Mill Pond, a dammed section of Lawrence Brook, at 40°27′34″N 74°25′53″W.

== Accessibility ==
Sawmill Brook runs through heavily populated areas, so it is easy to access.

== Sister tributaries ==
- Beaverdam Brook
- Great Ditch
- Ireland Brook
- Oakeys Brook
- Sucker Brook
- Terhune Run
- Unnamed Brook in Rutgers Gardens, unofficially named Doc Brook
- Unnamed Brook in Rutgers' Helyar Woods

== See also ==
- List of rivers in New Jersey
