= Great Ditch =

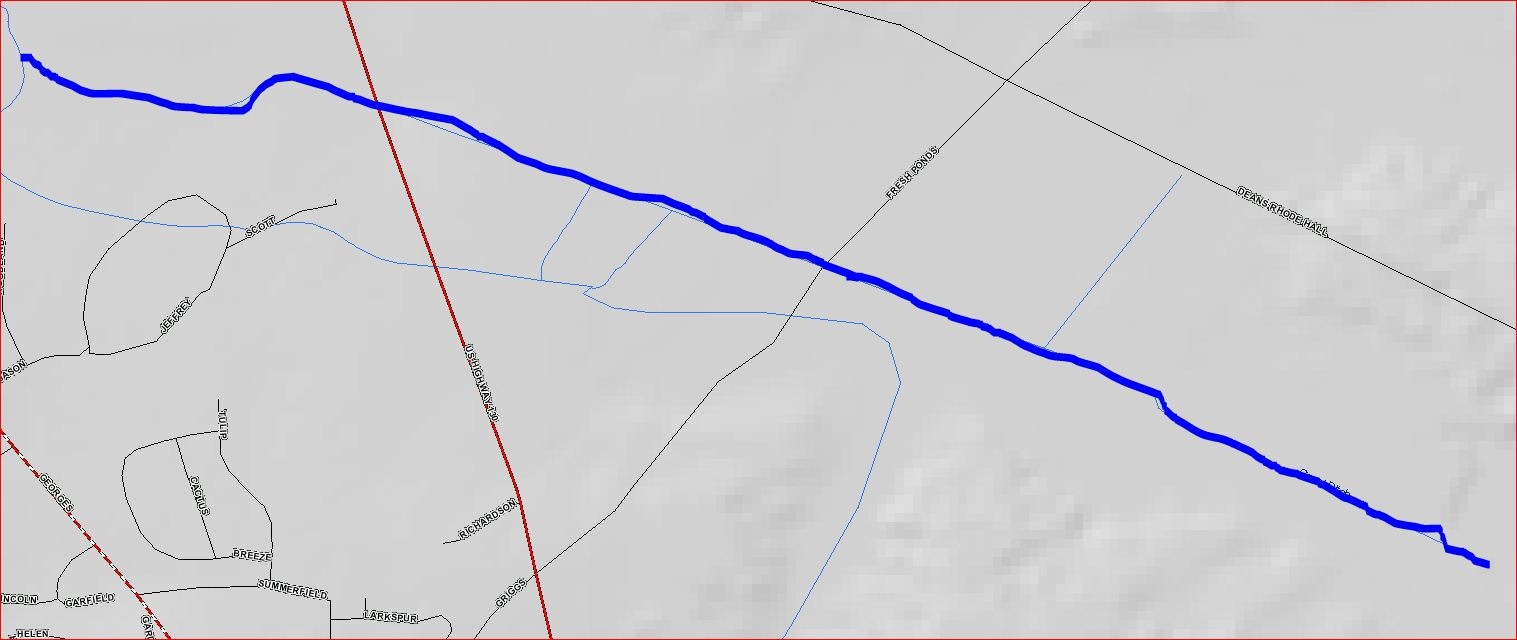
- Great Ditch map

Location
- Country: United States

Physical characteristics
- Source
  - coordinates: 40°23′5″N 74°28′57″W
  - elevation: 89 ft (27 m)
- Mouth
  - coordinates: 40°23′39″N 74°30′27″W

Basin features
- Progression: Lawrence Brook, Raritan River, Atlantic Ocean
- River system: Raritan River system

Great Ditch is a drainage ditch that drains areas of the Pigeon Swamp State Park in New Jersey in the United States.

== Course ==
Great Ditch starts at 40°23′5″N 74°28′57″W, in the Pigeon Swamp State Park. It flows west, crossing Fresh Ponds Road and Route 130 before joining another stream at 40°23′39″N 74°30′27″W which drains into the Lawrence Brook.

== Purpose ==
This canal's purpose is to drain sections of the Pigeon Swamp to prevent flooding of Deans Rhode Hall Road, which passes through the swamp.

== Sister tributaries ==
- Beaverdam Brook
- Ireland Brook
- Oakeys Brook
- Sawmill Brook
- Sucker Brook
- Terhune Run
- Unnamed brook in Rutgers Gardens, unofficially named Doc Brook
- Unnamed brook in Rutgers' Helyar Woods

== See also ==
- List of rivers of New Jersey
