= Ireland Brook (New Jersey) =

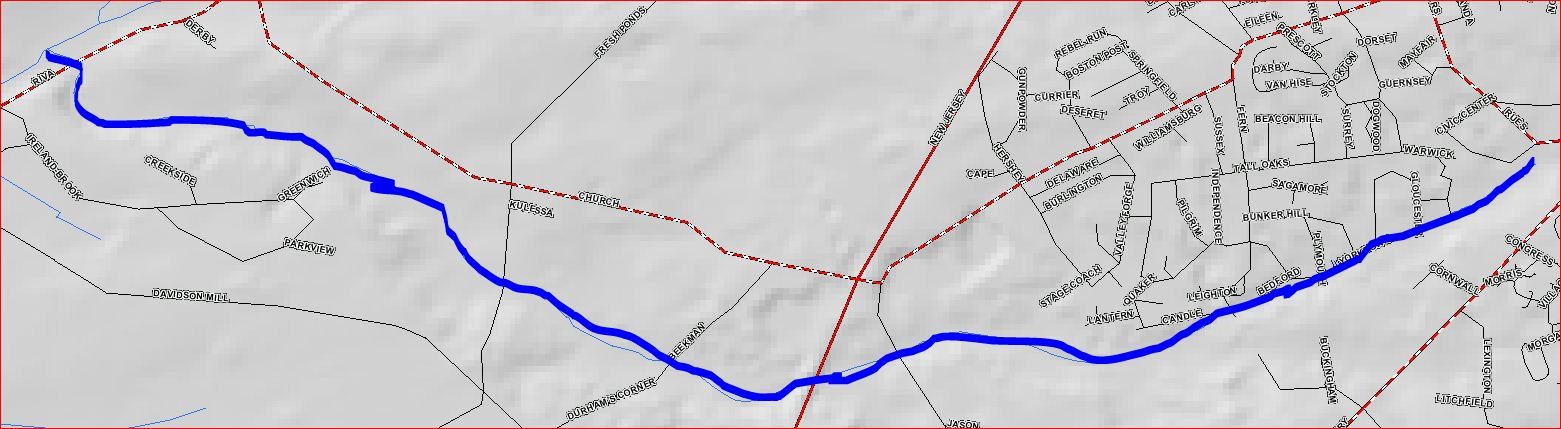
- Ireland Brook map

Location
- Country: United States

Physical characteristics
- Source
  - coordinates: 40°24′57″N 74°25′00″W
- Mouth
  - coordinates: 40°25′14″N 74°29′07″W
  - elevation: 52 ft (16 m)

Basin features
- Progression: Lawrence Brook, Raritan River, Atlantic Ocean

Ireland Brook is a tributary of Lawrence Brook in Middlesex County, New Jersey in the United States.

Ireland Brook is a moderately long stream that drains an area in central East Brunswick.

== Course ==
Its source is at 40°24′57″N 74°25′00″W, near the intersection of Cranbury Road and Rues Lane in east central East Brunswick. It crosses Fern Road, then runs through the East Brunswick Community Park and the Ireland Brook County Park. Crossing Dunhams Corner Road and the New Jersey Turnpike, it continues running through the long Ireland Brook County Park. It crosses Fresh Ponds Road and Riva Avenue, and drains into the Farrington Lake, a dammed section of the Lawrence Brook, at 40°25′14″N 74°29′07″W.

== Accessibility ==
This stream runs through a park, where it is easily accessible for about half of its distance. It also crosses many roads.

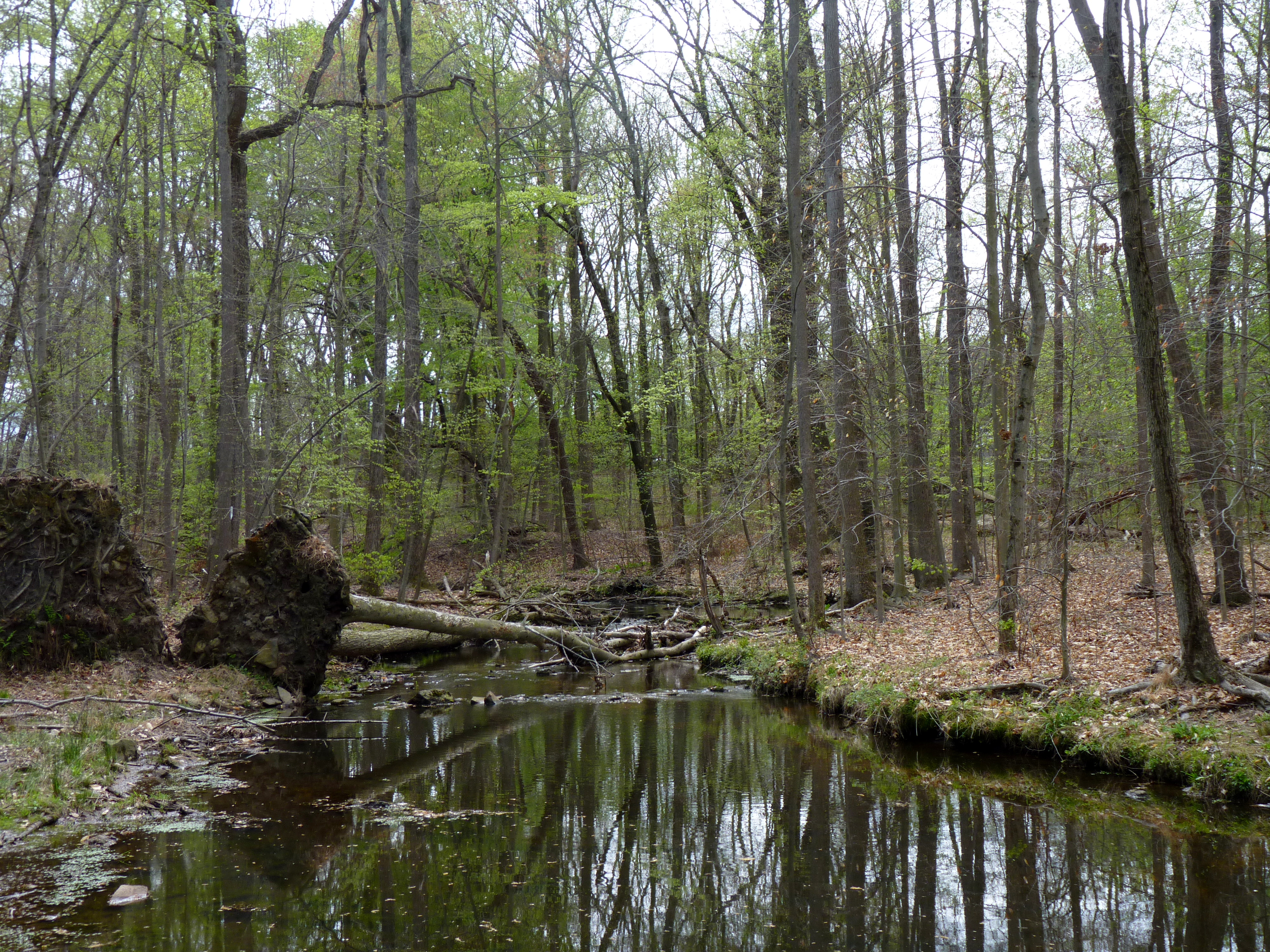
Ireland Brook in Ireland Brook Conservation Area

== Sister tributaries ==
- Beaverdam Brook
- Great Ditch
- Oakeys Brook
- Sawmill Brook
- Sucker Brook
- Terhune Run
- Unnamed Brook in Rutgers Gardens, unofficially named Doc Brook
- Unnamed Brook in Rutgers' Helyar Woods

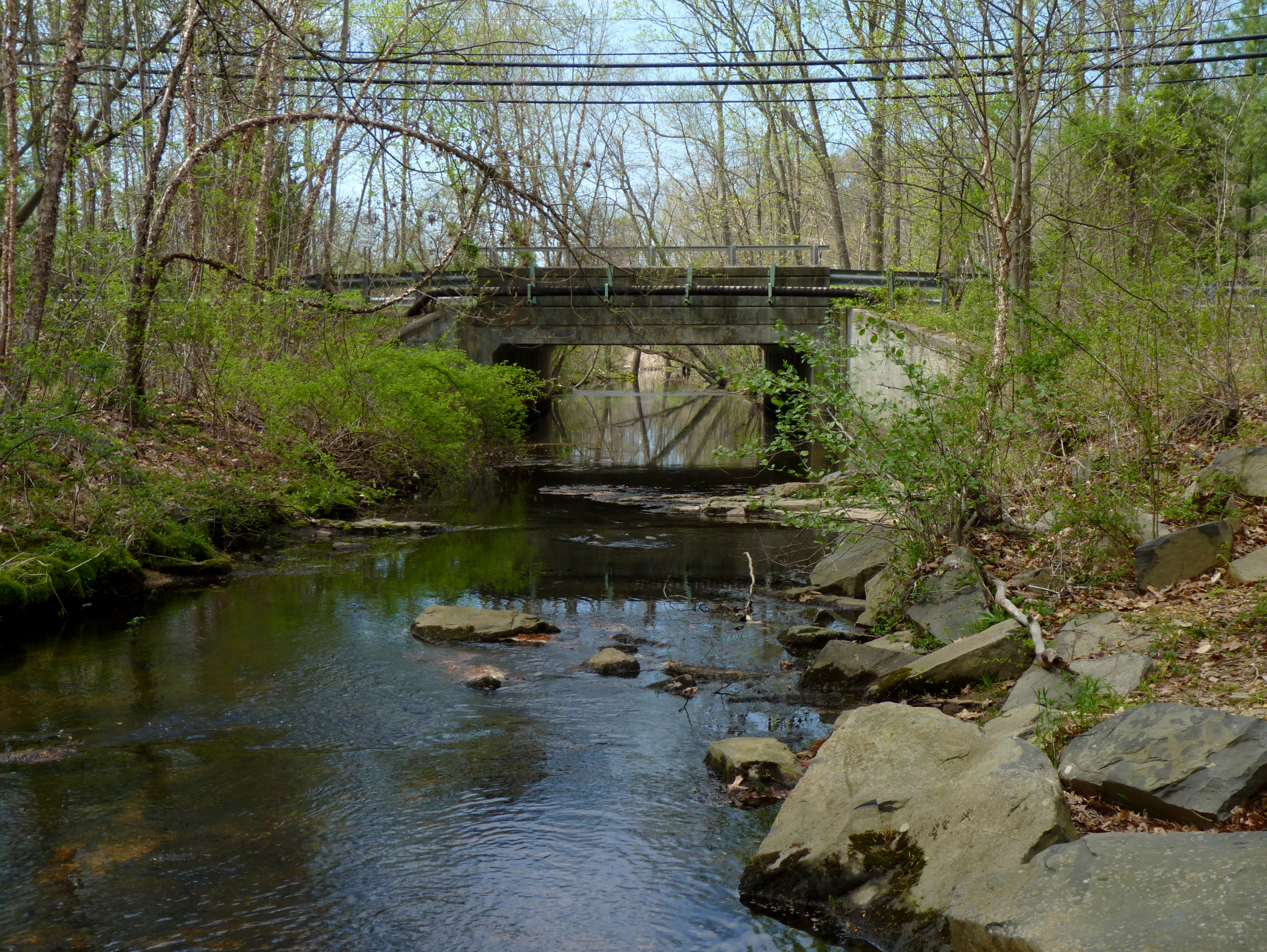
Bridge over Ireland Brook at Riva Avenue

== See also ==
- List of rivers of New Jersey
