= Terhune Run =

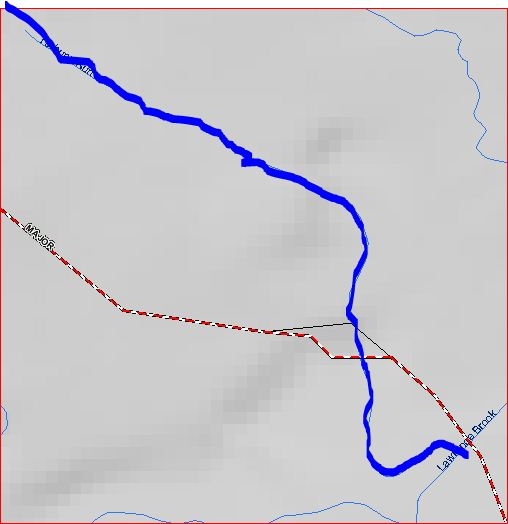
- Terhune Run map

Location
- Country: United States

Physical characteristics
- Source
  - coordinates: 40°24′1″N 74°32′29″W
- Mouth
  - coordinates: 40°23′22″N 74°31′51″W
  - elevation: 79 ft (24 m)

Basin features
- Progression: Lawrence Brook, Raritan River, Atlantic Ocean
- River system: Raritan River system

Terhune Run is a tributary of Lawrence Brook in eastern South Brunswick, New Jersey in the United States.

== Course ==
Terhune Run starts at 40°24′1″N 74°32′29″W, near the intersection of Route 1 and Major Road. It flows south, crossing Major Road, until it drains into Lawrence Brook at 40°23′22″N 74°31′51″W, in Reichler Park.

== Accessibility ==
Terhune Run is short, crossing one road, making it hard to access.

== Sister tributaries ==
- Beaverdam Brook
- Great Ditch
- Ireland Brook
- Oakeys Brook
- Sawmill Brook
- Sucker Brook
- Unnamed Brook in Rutgers Gardens, unofficially named Doc Brook
- Unnamed Brook in Rutgers' Helyar Woods

== See also ==
- List of rivers of New Jersey
