= Beaverdam Brook (New Jersey) =

River in New Jersey, United States

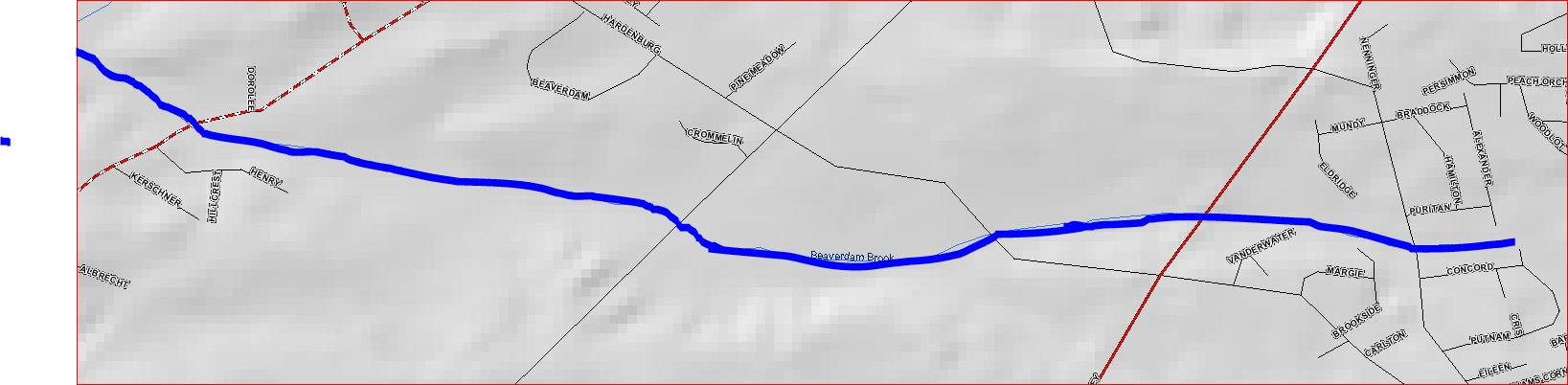
- Beaverdam Brook map

Location
- Country: United States

Physical characteristics
- Source
  - coordinates: 40°25′33″N 74°25′44″W
- Mouth
  - coordinates: 40°25′53″N 74°28′18″W
  - elevation: 49 ft (15 m)

Basin features
- Progression: Lawrence Brook, Raritan River, Atlantic Ocean

Beaverdam Brook is a tributary of Lawrence Brook in central East Brunswick, New Jersey in the United States.

== Course ==
The source of Beaverdam Brook is at 40°25′33″N 74°25′44″W in central East Brunswick, near the intersection of CR-617 (Ryders Lane) and Dunhams Corner Road. It crosses Dutch Road and the New Jersey Turnpike. It flows under Hardenburg Lane, and goes through the Tamarack County Golf Course. It crosses Fresh Ponds Road and Riva Avenue and drains into Farrington Lake, a dammed section of Lawrence Brook, at 40°25′53″N 74°28′18″W.

== Accessibility ==
This stream crosses many roads and runs through a golf course, both of which make it easily accessible.

== Sister tributaries ==
- Great Ditch
- Ireland Brook
- Oakeys Brook
- Sawmill Brook
- Sucker Brook
- Terhune Run
- Unnamed Brook in Rutgers Gardens, unofficially named Doc Brook
- Unnamed Brook in Rutgers' Helyar Woods

== See also ==
- List of rivers of New Jersey
