= Westons Mills =

Westons Mills may refer to a location in the United States:

- Westons Mills, New Jersey
- Weston Mills, New York
