= Pigeon Swamp State Park =

State park in New Jersey, United States

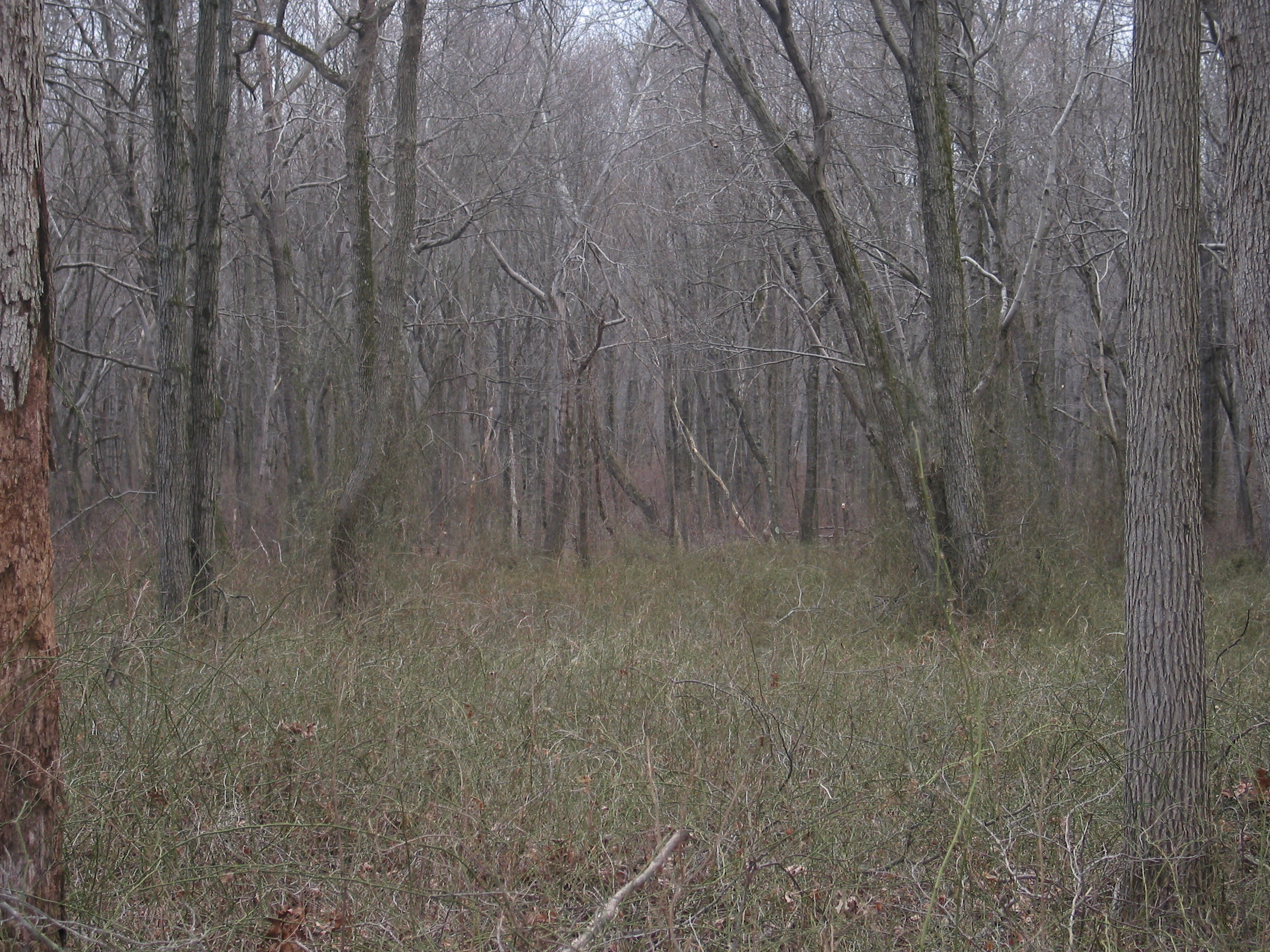
- Pigeon Swamp in January 2006

- Location within Middlesex County, New Jersey
- Location: South Brunswick, New Jersey
- Coordinates: 40°23′13″N 74°28′26″W
- Area: 1,078 acres (4.36 km^{2})

U.S. National Natural Landmark
- Designated: 1976

Pigeon Swamp State Park is a 1,078-acre (4.36 km^{2}) New Jersey state park located on Deans Rhode Hall Road (Middlesex CR-610) in South Brunswick, in Middlesex County, New Jersey, United States. It is an undeveloped park, with a mix of habitats including open ponds and uplands hardwood forests. It also includes a good example of an inner coastal plain lowland deciduous hardwood forest. At one time, it was a major nesting site for passenger pigeons before they became extinct. It was declared a National Natural Landmark in December 1976.

The park is located in the Lawrence Brook watershed.

== History ==
The name of the park came from one of its original owners, Ann Pidgeon, daughter of Jeremiah Basse. It transferred to John Wetheril in 1761. In 1780, the building of the Great Ditch was begun which attempted to drain Pigeon Swamp in order to create farmland. The ditch was maintained by the state until the mid 19th century. In 1945, the Dallenbach Sand Company dredged part of the site, near what is now I-95. The dredged section is clearly visible from Deans Rhode Hall Road as an open area with a large lake. The entire area is fenced off.

As of February 1973, Pigeon Swamp was a 2,600 acres (11 km^{2}) unprotected wetland. In 1974, efforts began to turn it into a state park. The park comprises a large number of land plots, owned by the state of New Jersey and managed by its Department of Environmental Protection, Division of Parks and Forestry. Development continues to occur nearby, although there are attempts to preserve space for historical or environmental reasons.

== Flora and fauna ==
Many instances of sweetgum, red maple, pin oak and black gum trees are visible from the road and trails. In the open meadows, kestrels and red-tailed hawks have been spotted. There are also vernal pools which are heavily used by amphibians

== Visiting ==
The park is mostly undeveloped land, with no facilities, other than a small parking area. Deer hunting is allowed in the park, so appropriate cautions must be taken during deer season, including wearing Blaze orange clothing.

A certain area of the park is closed off to the general public. It is used as a training facility for large cranes and tractors. The area, which includes a lake, is surrounded by barbed wire fences.
