= Edward S. Kearney House =

Historic house in New Jersey, U.S.

- U.S. National Register of Historic Places
- New Jersey Register of Historic Places
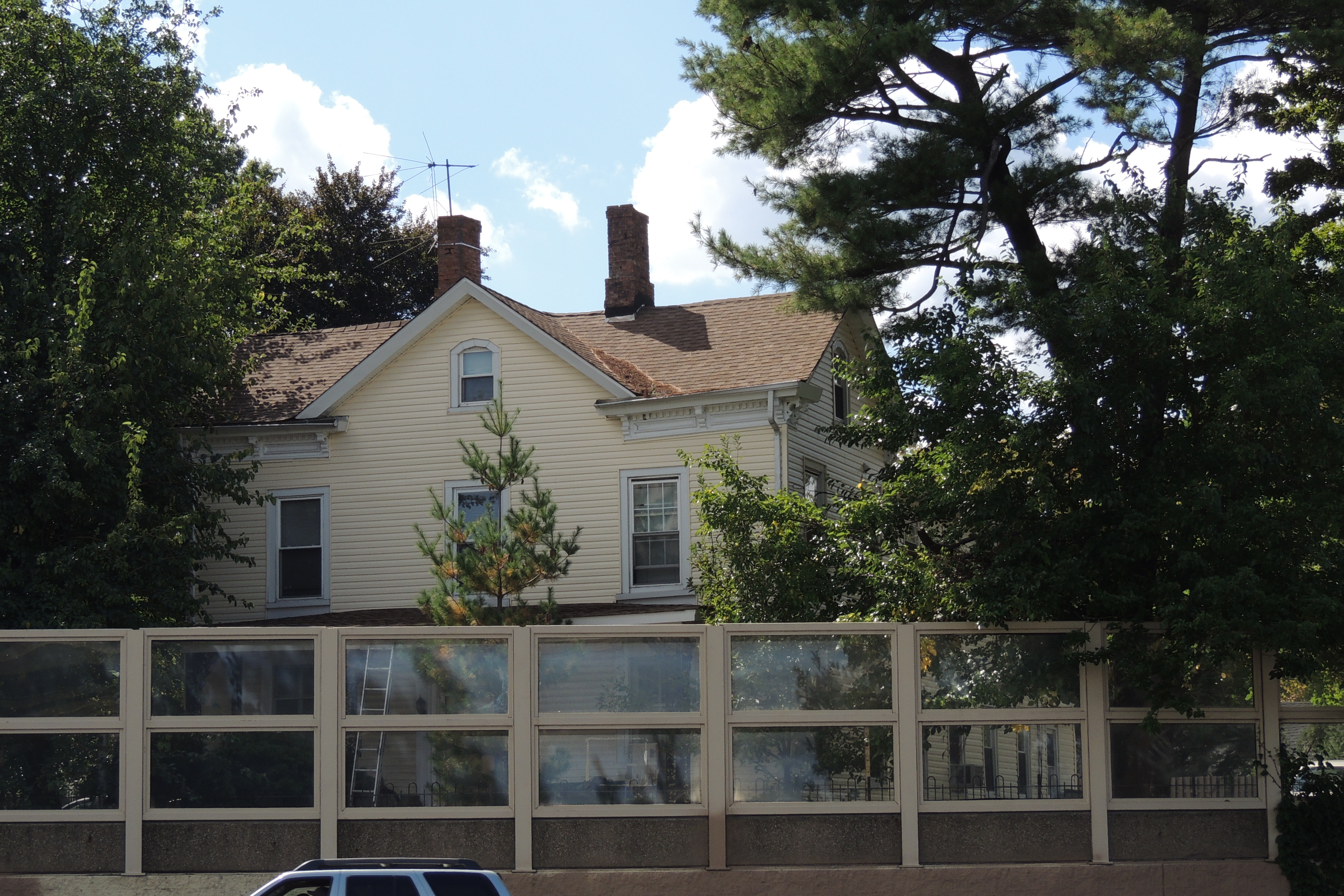

- Location within Middlesex County, New Jersey Location within New Jersey Location within the United States
- Location: 9 New Jersey Route 18, East Brunswick, New Jersey
- Coordinates: 40°28′51″N 74°24′45″W
- Area: 3 acres (1.2 ha)
- Built: 1855
- NRHP reference No.: 79001504
- NJRHP No.: 1834

Significant dates
- Added to NRHP: April 6, 1979
- Designated NJRHP: January 21, 1979

The Edward S. Kearney House is a historic house located at 9 New Jersey Route 18 in the Westons Mills section of East Brunswick in Middlesex County, New Jersey. It was added to the National Register of Historic Places on April 6, 1979, for its significance in architecture and commerce, one of only two historic taverns in the township.

== History and description ==
Edward S. Kearney immigrated from Ireland in the 1840s and bought property at Westons Mills in the early 1850s. He soon built this two and one-half story frame house. In 1886, he sold it to Barthy McGough, who converted it into a hotel and inn, first known as McGough's Tavern, and then the Cosmopolitan Hotel. The business operated nearly fifty years. McGough, from New York City, also owned a bar and restaurant in New Brunswick near the train station.

== See also ==
- National Register of Historic Places listings in Middlesex County, New Jersey
