= Farrington Lake =

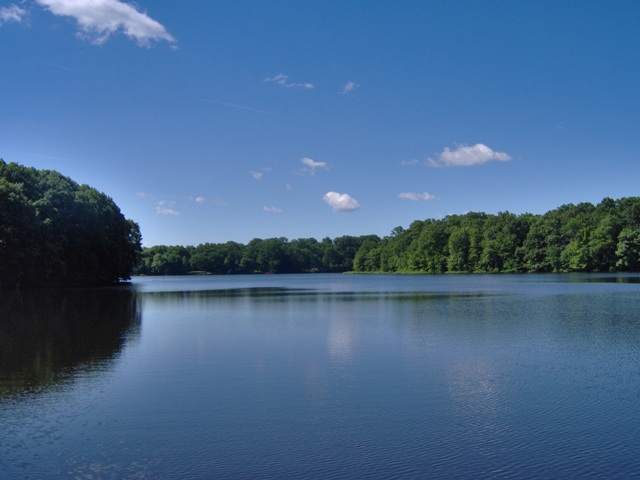

- Location within Middlesex County, New Jersey Location within New Jersey Location within the United States
- Location: East Brunswick / North Brunswick, Middlesex County, New Jersey
- Coordinates: 40°26′55″N 74°27′12″W
- Primary inflows: Lawrence Brook
- Primary outflows: Lawrence Brook
- Catchment area: Lawrence Brook Watershed
- Basin countries: United States
- Surface area: 1.17 km^{2} (290 acres)
- Average depth: 2 m (6.6 ft)
- Max. depth: 4 m (13 ft)
- Settlements: East Brunswick, North Brunswick and South Brunswick

Farrington Lake is a scenic freshwater reservoir in Middlesex County, New Jersey near Milltown, New Jersey. Created by a dam on the Lawrence Brook, a tributary of the Raritan River, the lake is in fact a widened section of the Lawrence Brook. Its main tributaries are the Ireland Brook, the Beaverdam Brook, and the Oakeys Brook.

The lake is named after Edward Farrington, mayor of New Brunswick, New Jersey, in 1915–1918, who envisioned the construction of the dam to supply water to his city. Mayor Farrington died while in office, in 1918.

The lake is bordered by East Brunswick, North Brunswick and South Brunswick. It covers about 1.17 km^{2} (290 acres) and has a mean depth of 2 meters (6.6 feet) with a maximum depth of 4 meters (13 feet). The lake is accessible from a boat ramp; the only powered boats allowed are those with an electric motor.

Fish species in the lake include Chain Pickerel, Channel Catfish, Largemouth Bass, Northern Pike, Crappie, Brown Trout, Yellow Perch and Rainbow Trout.

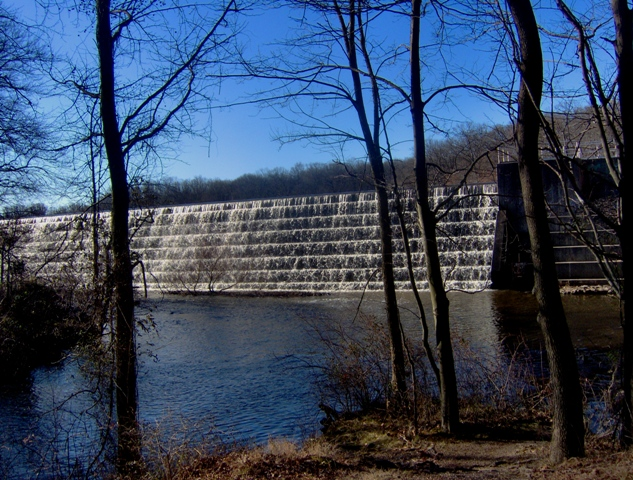
Dam of Farrington Lake (North Brunswick)
