= Cow Yard Brook (New Jersey) =

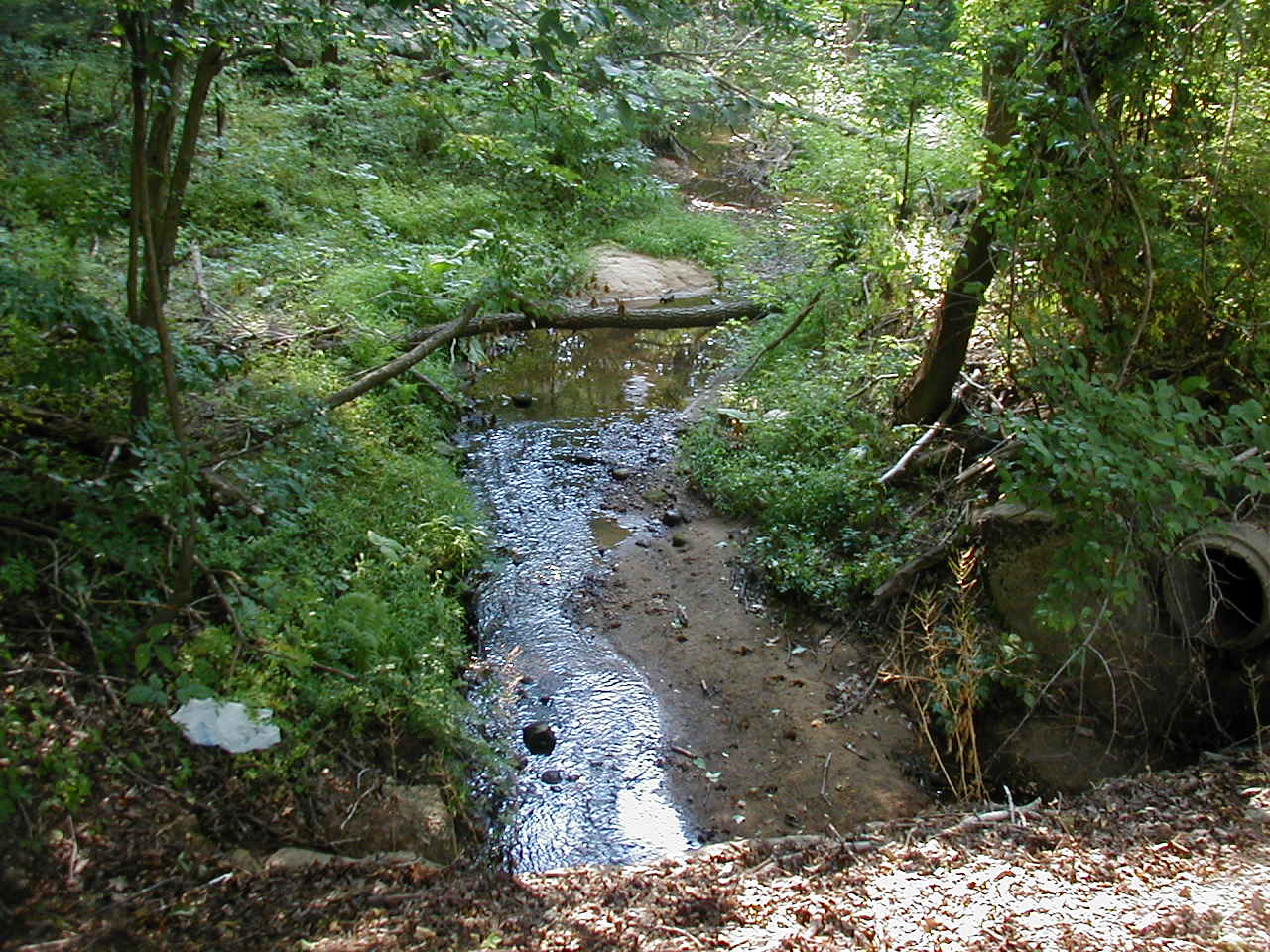
- Cow Yard Brook crossing Deans Lane

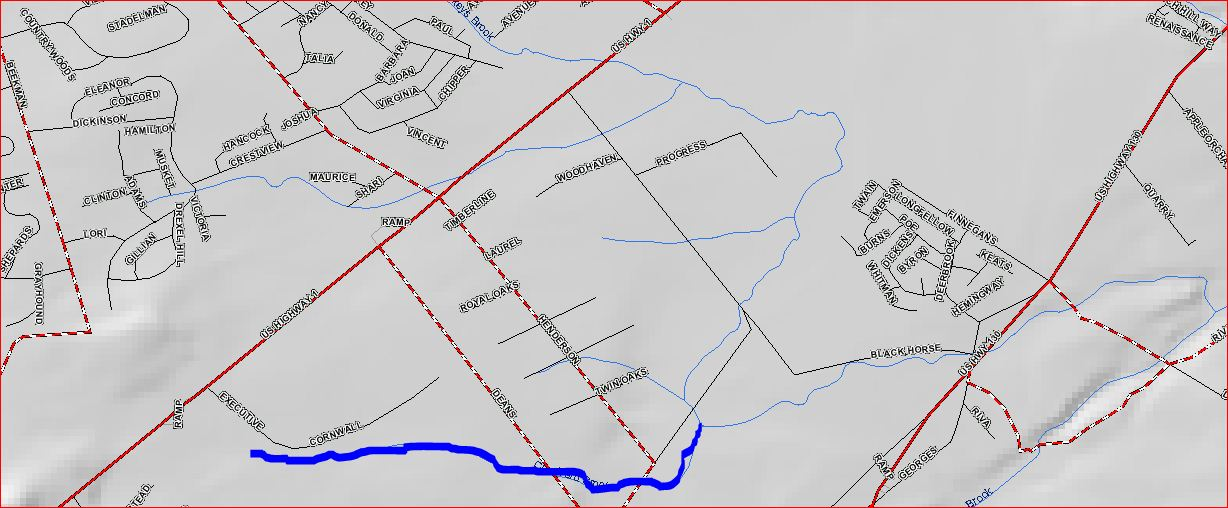
- Map of Cow Yard Brook

Location
- Country: United States

Physical characteristics
- Source
  - coordinates: 40°24′43″N 74°32′8″W
- Mouth
  - coordinates: 40°24′46″N 74°30′51″W
  - elevation: 98 ft (30 m)

Basin features
- Progression: Oakeys Brook, Lawrence Brook, Raritan River, Atlantic Ocean

The Cow Yard Brook is a small tributary of the Oakeys Brook, in central South Brunswick, New Jersey in the United States.

== Course ==
The Cow Yard Brook starts at 40°24′43″N 74°32′8″W near the intersection of Beekman Road, Northumberland Way, and US Route 1. It crosses Deans Lane near its intersection with Black Horse Lane. It then crosses Black Horse Lane and drains into the Oakeys Brook at 40°24′46″N 74°30′51″W, near the intersection of Black Horse Lane and Henderson Road.

== Accessibility ==
The Cow Yard Brook is very short, but it can be accessed by some of the roads it crosses and the Oakeys Brook.

== Gallery ==
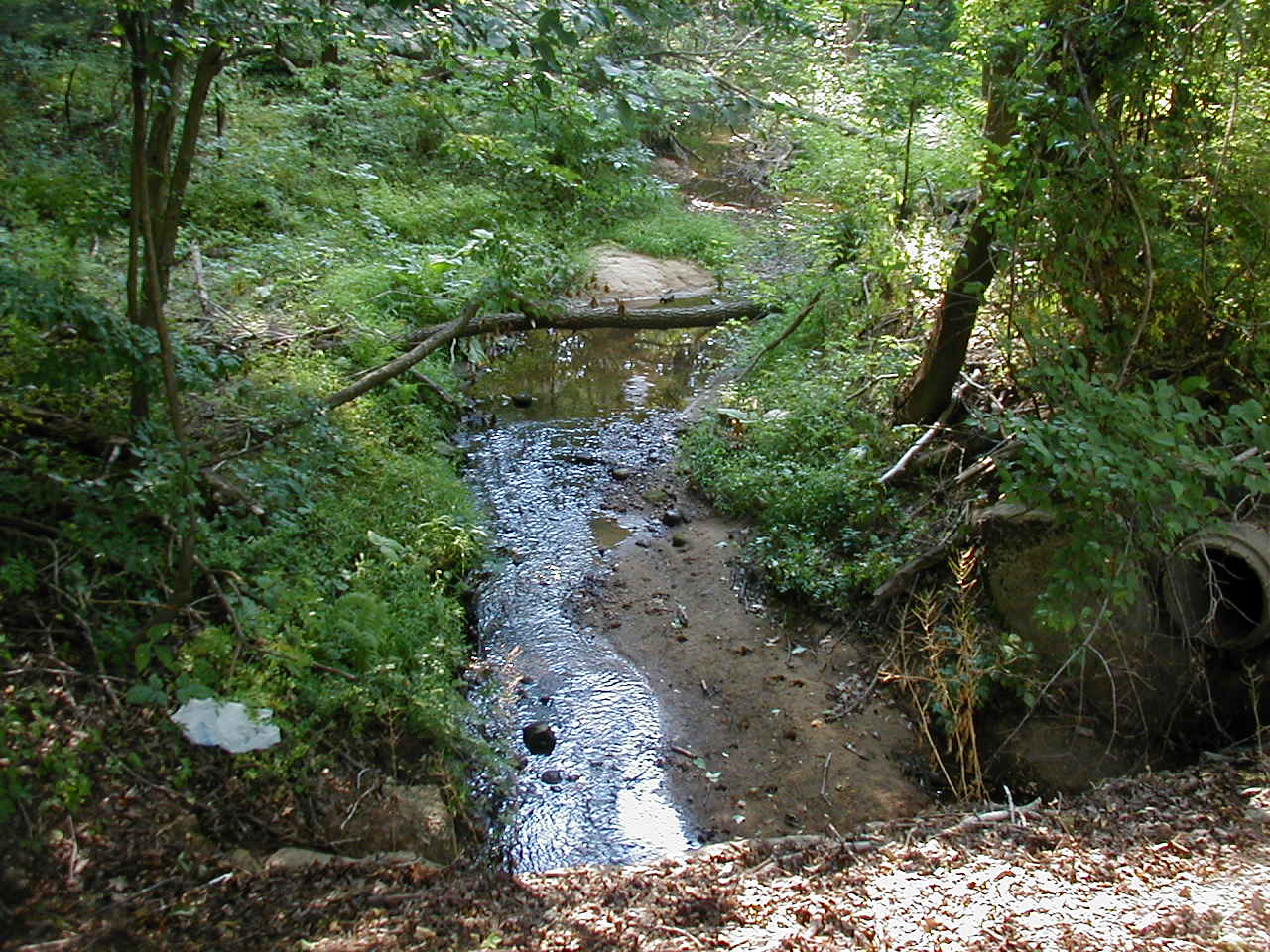
Cow Yard Brook at Deans Lane

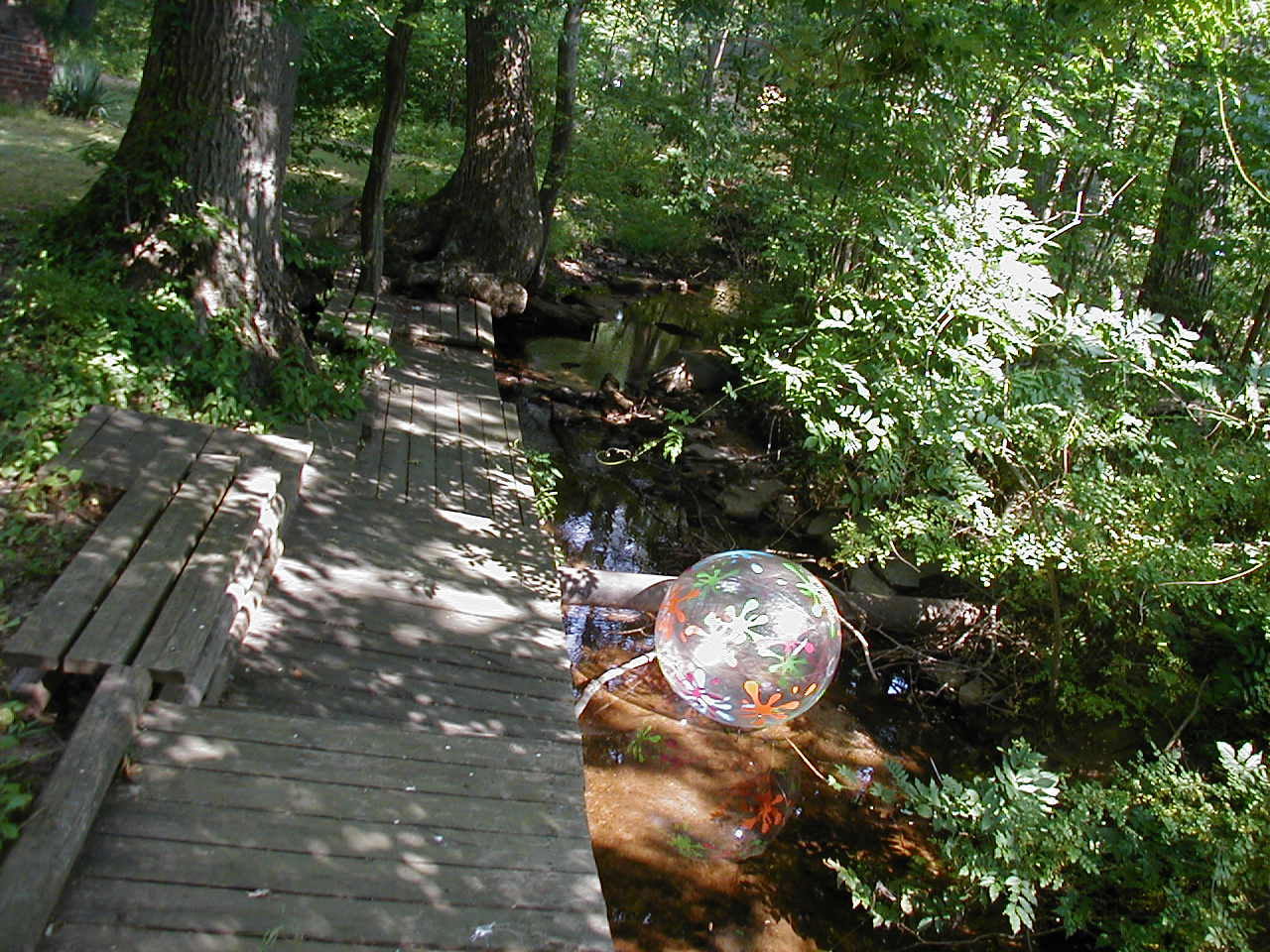
Cow Yard Brook at Deans Lane

== See also ==
- List of rivers of New Jersey
