= Westons Mills, New Jersey =

Populated place in Middlesex County, New Jersey, US

- Unincorporated community
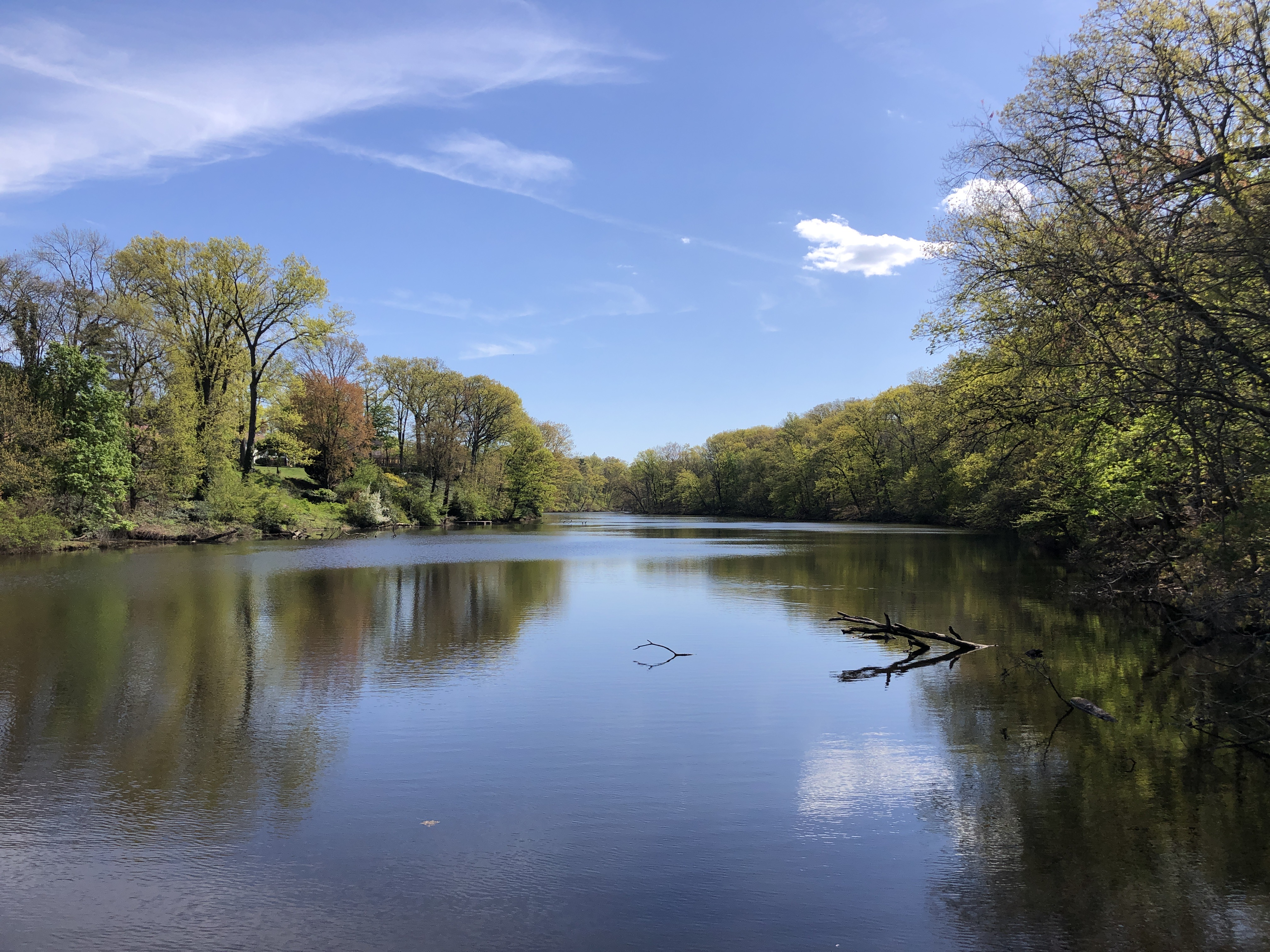
- Westons Mill Pond in Westons Mills

- Location within Middlesex County, New Jersey Location within New Jersey Location within the United States
- Coordinates: 40°29′07″N 74°24′45″W
- Country: United States
- State: New Jersey
- County: Middlesex
- City and Township: New Brunswick and East Brunswick
- Elevation: 39 ft (12 m)
- GNIS feature ID: 881750

Westons Mills or Westons Mill is an unincorporated community located along the border of East Brunswick and New Brunswick in Middlesex County, New Jersey, United States. It is the location of Westons Mill Pond.

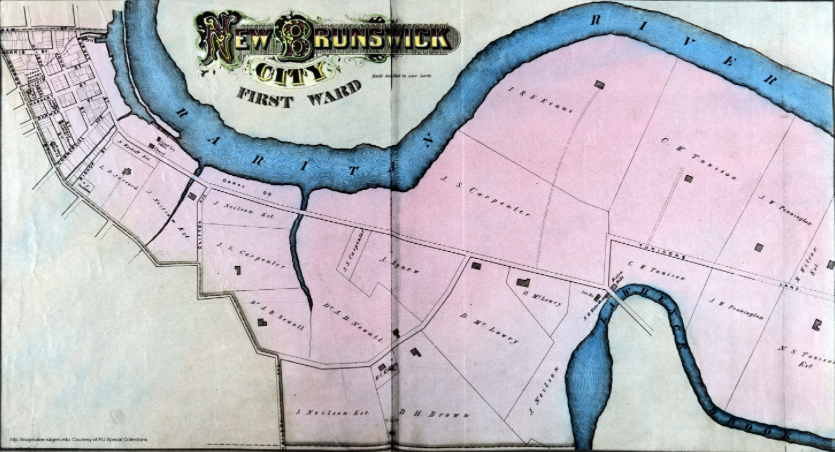
1876 map of New Brunswick's First Ward, showing Weston's Mill at the bend in Lawrence Brook.

== See also ==
- Edward S. Kearney House – listed on the NRHP
