= Westons Mill Pond =

Reservoir in New Jersey, United States

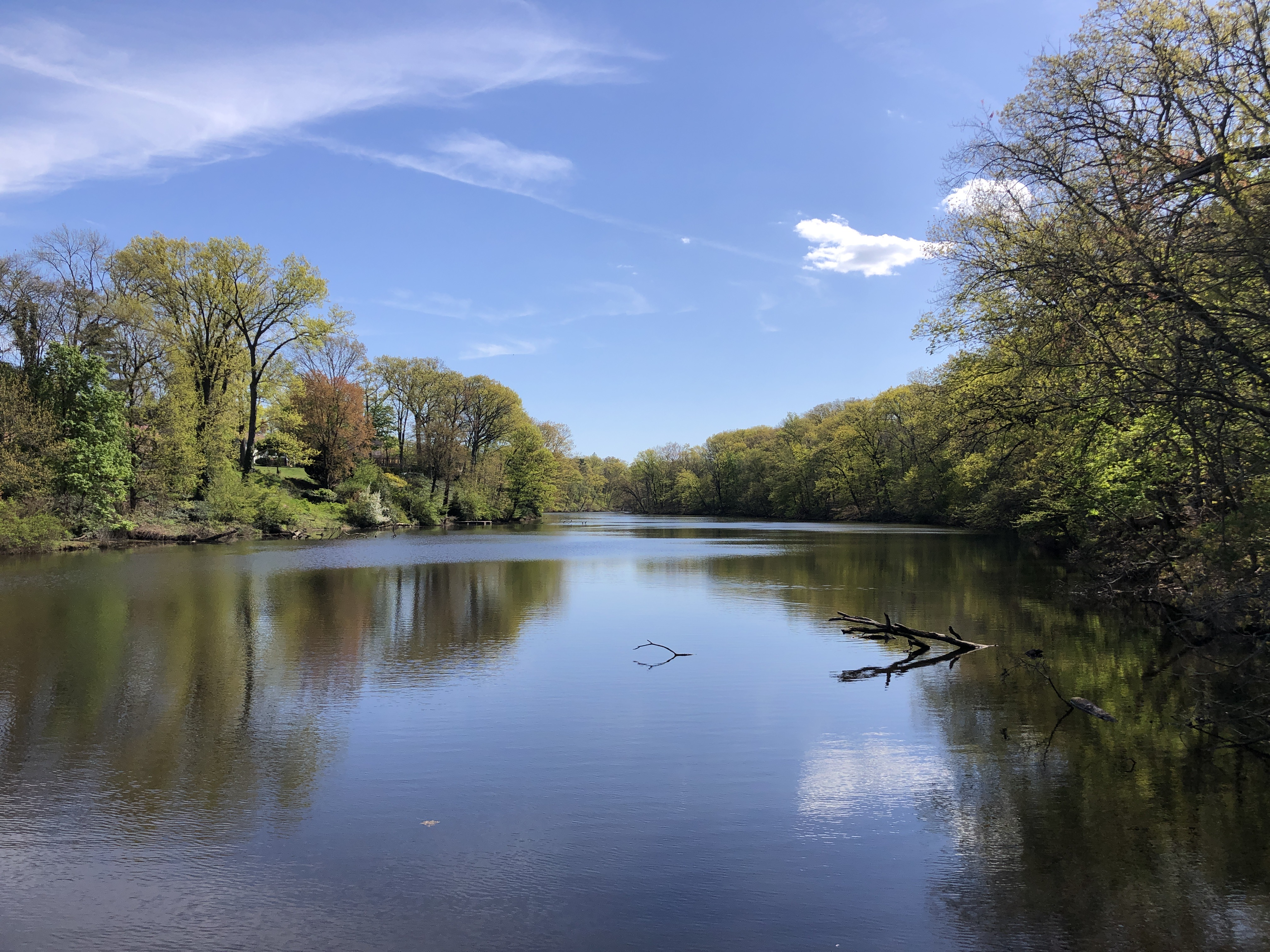
- Westons Mill Pond, with Rutgers University on the right

- Location in Middlesex County, New Jersey Westons Mill Pond (New Jersey) Westons Mill Pond (the United States)
- Location: Westons Mills section of East Brunswick, New Jersey, United States, with portions extending into New Brunswick and North Brunswick
- Coordinates: 40°28′59″N 74°24′46″W
- Type: Reservoir
- Basin countries: United States
- Surface elevation: 16 feet (4.9 m)

The Westons Mill Pond is a dammed section of the Lawrence Brook. The dam is located in the Westons Mills section of East Brunswick, New Jersey, United States, but the pond also borders the city of New Brunswick and North Brunswick Township. It is one of a series of dams on the Lawrence Brook. The Westons Mill Pond Dam is the dam that controls reservoir output. The Westons Mill Pond is available for boating, although gasoline motors are prohibited due to the highly sensitive wildlife ecosystems found there.

== Dam ==
The dam is found near Route 18 in the outskirts of New Brunswick. Its elevation is 16 feet above sea level. It can be accessed on Burnet Street (Tower Center Boulevard), where the maintenance equipment is stored. There is a second, unofficial dam slightly further upstream.

== See also ==
- List of rivers of New Jersey
- Lawrence Brook
