= Lawrence Brook =

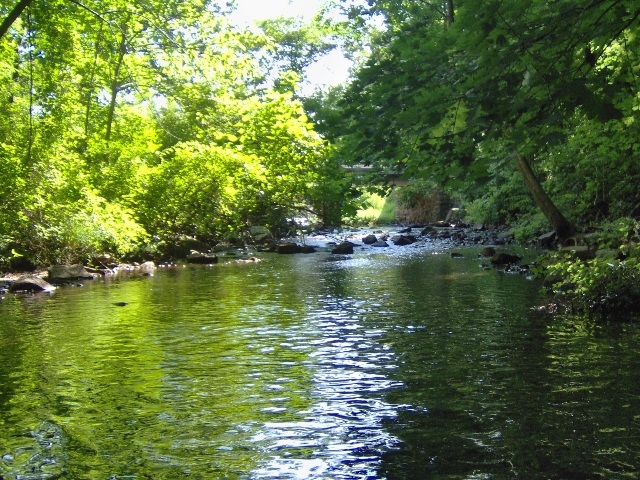
- One of the few undammed sections of Lawrence Brook (below Davidsons Mill Pond)

Location
- Country: United States

Physical characteristics
- Source
  - coordinates: 40°22′33″N 74°32′32″W
- Mouth
  - coordinates: 40°29′5″N 74°23′34″W
  - elevation: 3 ft (0.91 m)
- Basin size: 40 mi^{2} (100 km^{2})

Basin features
- Progression: Raritan River, Atlantic Ocean
- River system: Raritan River system
- Tributaries
  - left: Terhune Run, Oakeys Brook, Sucker Brook,
  - right: Great Ditch, Ireland Brook, Beaverdam Brook, Sawmill Brook

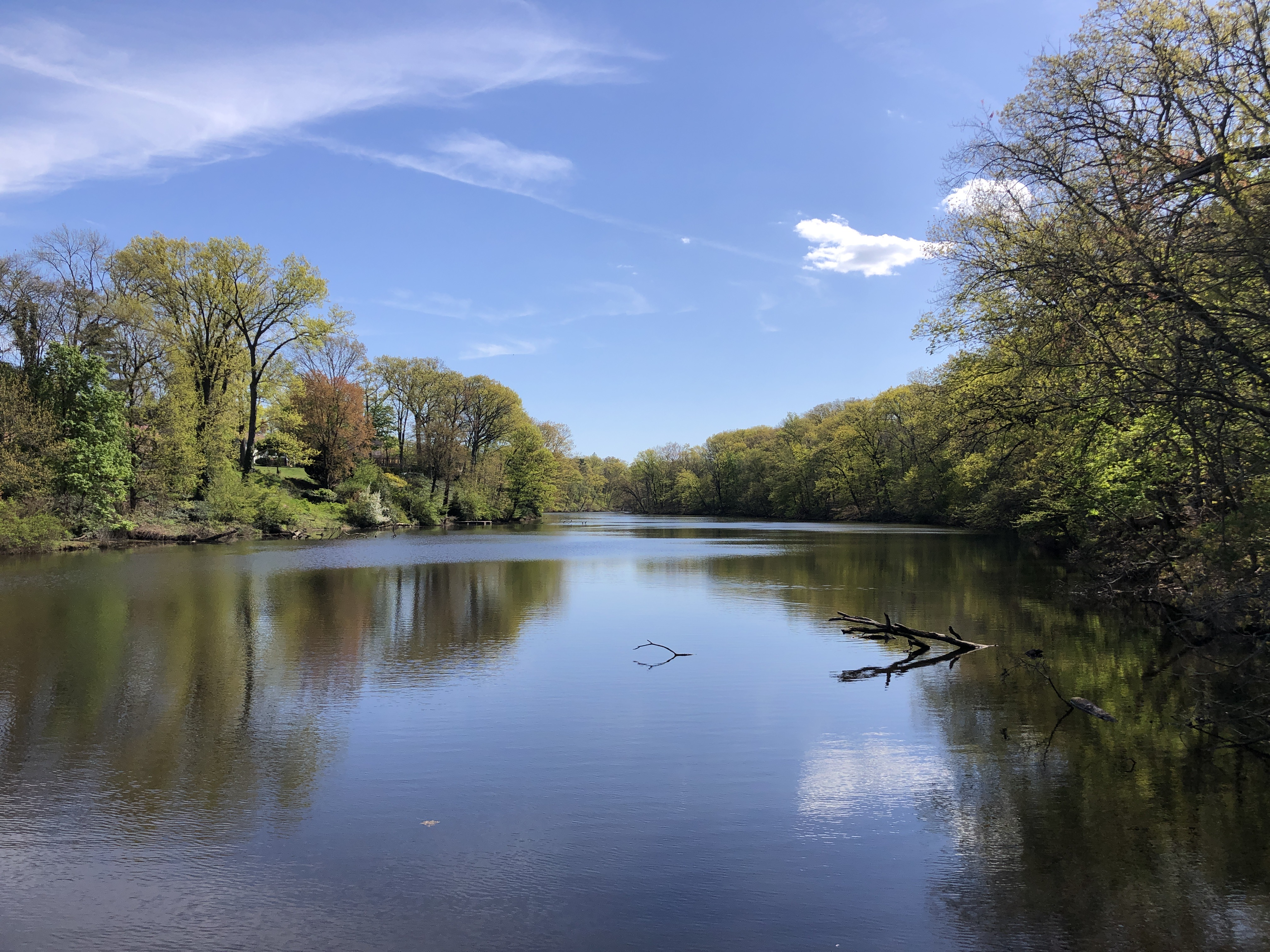
Westons Mill Pond section of Lawrence Brook, with Rutgers University on the right

Lawrence Brook is a tributary of the Raritan River in Middlesex County, New Jersey, in the United States.

== Course ==
Originally a 10-mile (16 km) stream, its course now includes man-made lakes created by dams built in the 19th and 20th centuries: Deans Pond (South Brunswick), Davidsons Mill Pond (South Brunswick), Farrington Lake (South Brunswick, North Brunswick and East Brunswick), Mill Pond (Milltown), and Westons Mill Pond (Milltown, East Brunswick, North Brunswick and New Brunswick). Its lowest section, near the Raritan River, is tidal; it hosts marine wildlife and is regarded as a coastal area.

Its drainage basin, the Lawrence Brook watershed, is a 40-square-mile (100 km^{2}) area, identified by the USGS code HUC 02030105130.

At the stretch at Weston's Mill Pond, Lawrence Brook crosses Rutgers University's Cook Campus, along the vegetable research farm, the equine research farm, Rutgers Gardens, and Helyar forest.

Lawrence Brook is a wildlife corridor, a bird migration area and a highly sensitive body of water. Power boats, except with an electric motor, are not permitted on the brook.

== History ==
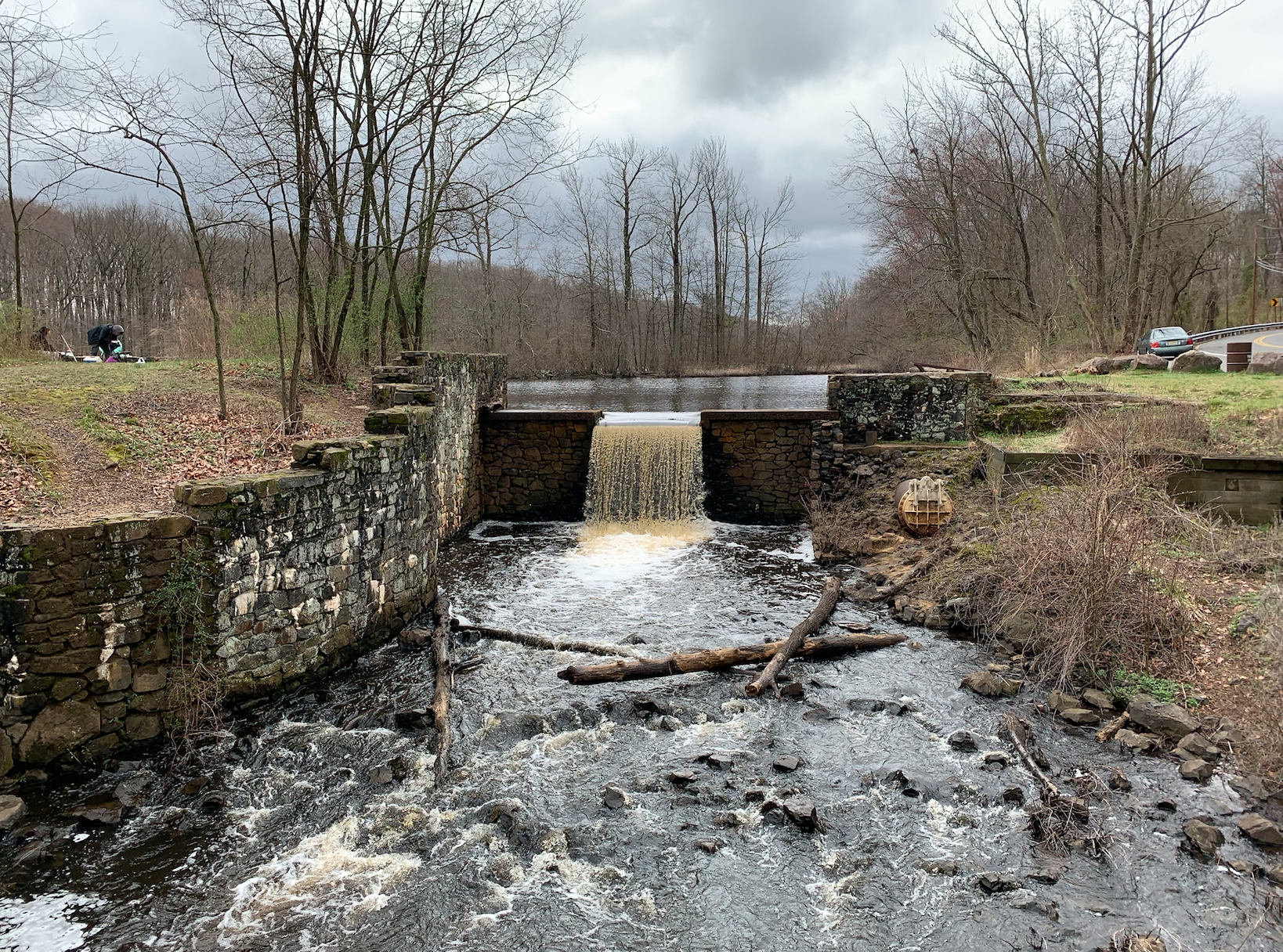
Waterfall stemming from Davidson Mill Pond in South Brunswick

- This stream was called Piscopeek by the Unami Lenni Lenape Indians. Its current name comes from Mr.Thomas Lawrence, a New York City baker, who acquired its surrounding land in the 17th century. Some historical maps show the spelling Lawrence's Brook.
- In the late 19th and early 20th centuries, Farrington Lake area served as a resort area, with a trolley line running from New Brunswick through Milltown then turning south to eventually end at the State Fair Grounds in Trenton. The lake (named for a mayor of New Brunswick who died during WWI) was formed by a dam built above a lower working dam that powered a snuff mill built in the mid 19th century.

== Pictures ==
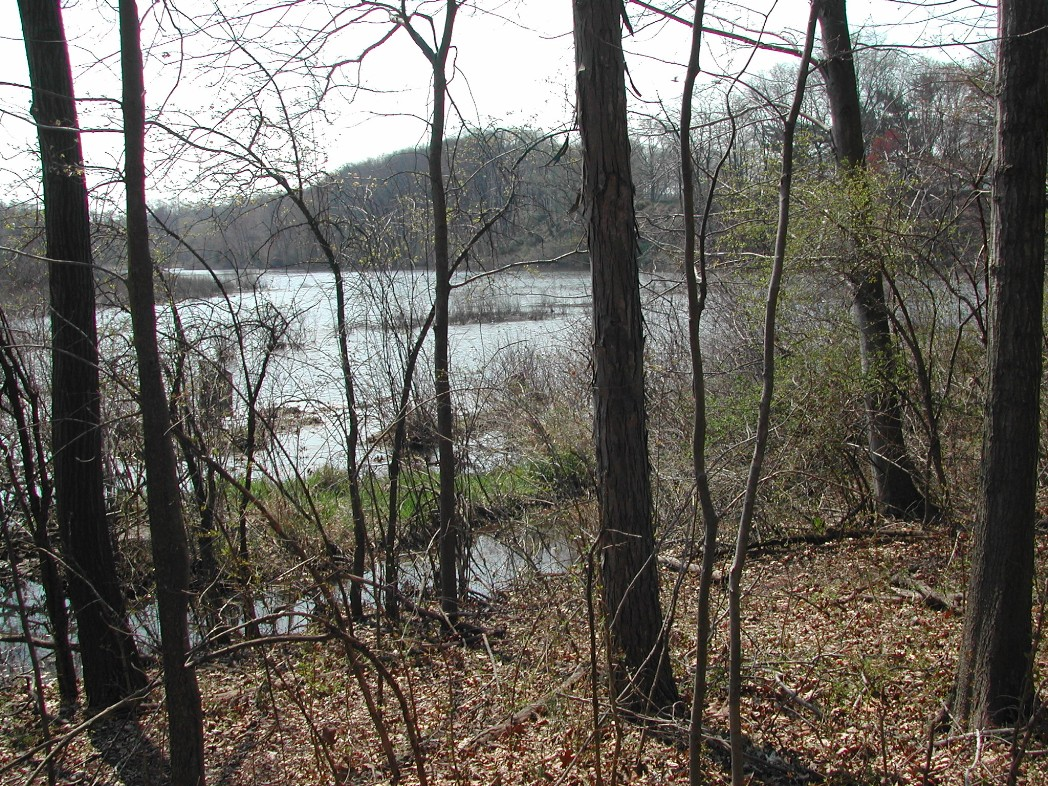
Lawrence Brook in East Brunswick

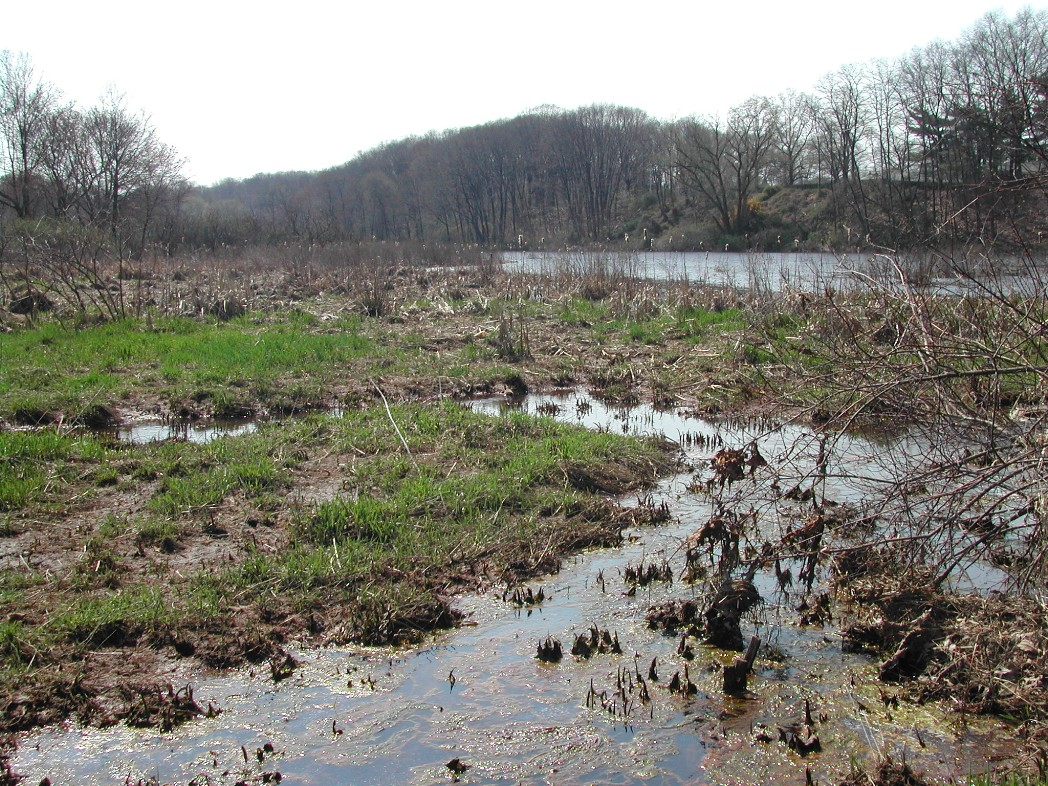
Lawrence Brook in East Brunswick

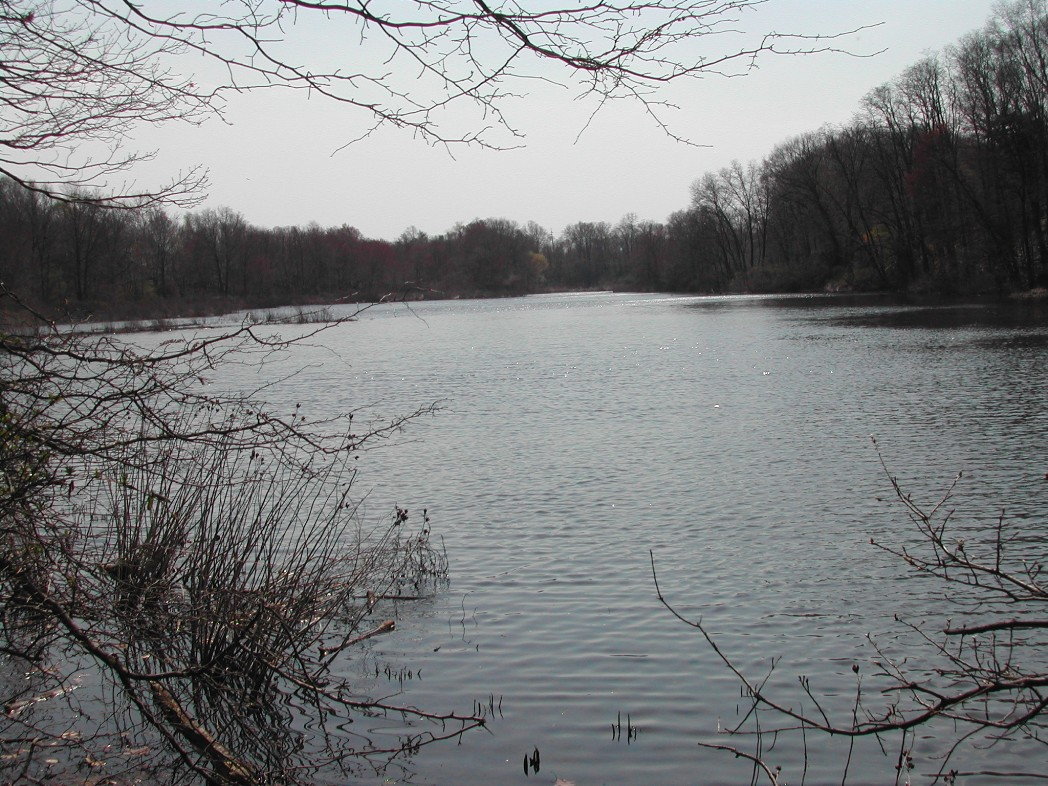
Lawrence Brook in East Brunswick

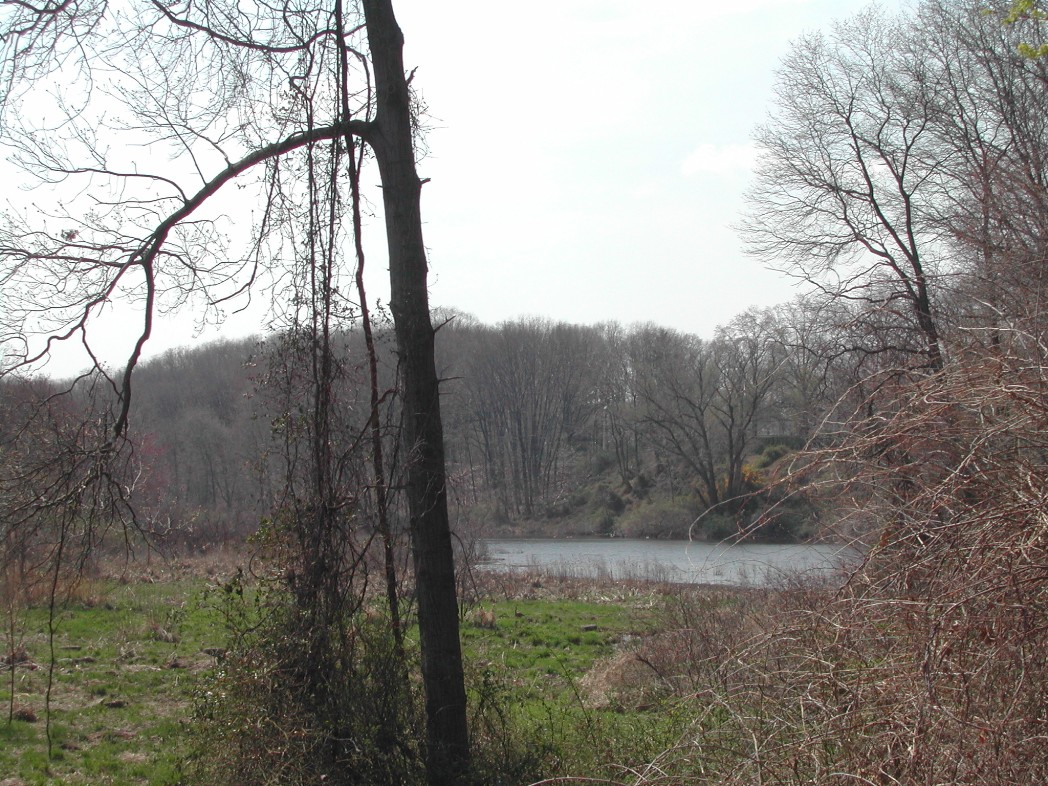
Lawrence Brook in East Brunswick

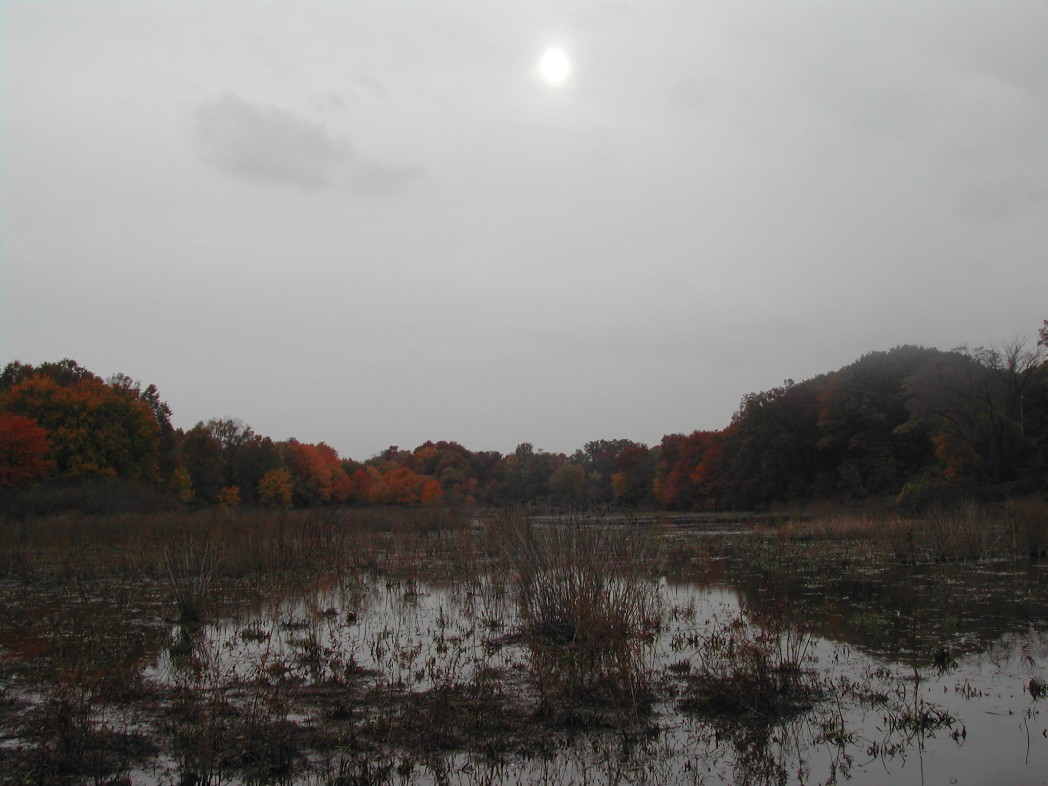
Lawrence Brook in East Brunswick

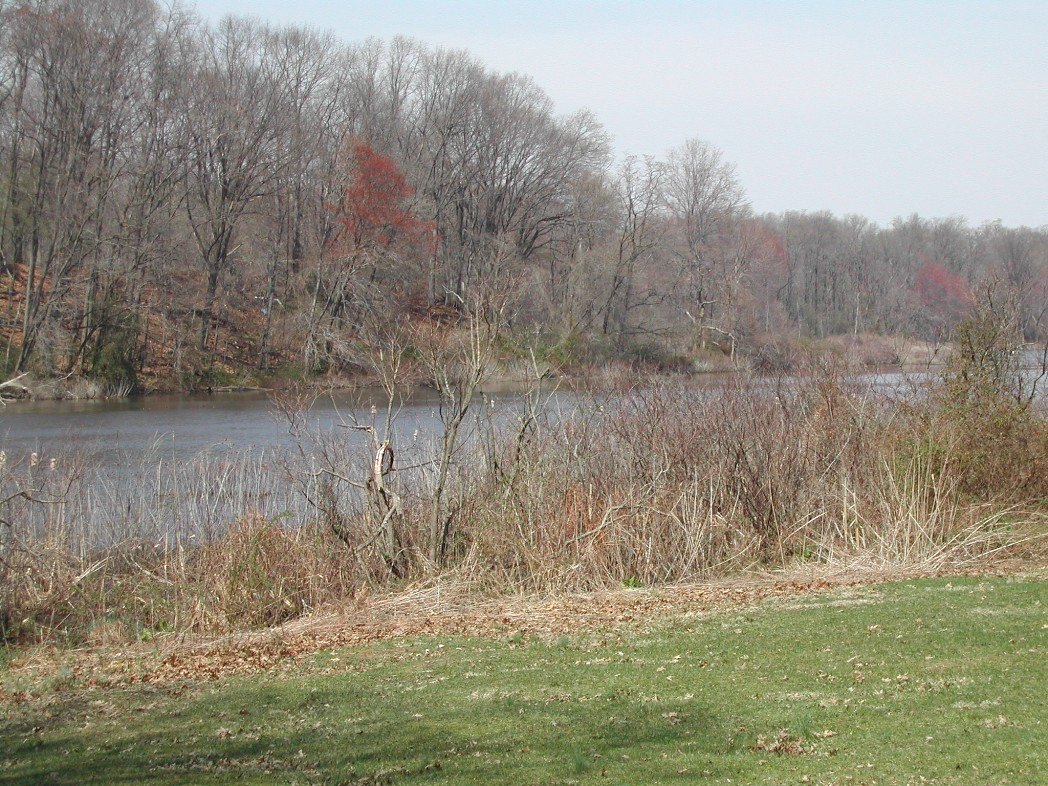
Lawrence Brook in Milltown

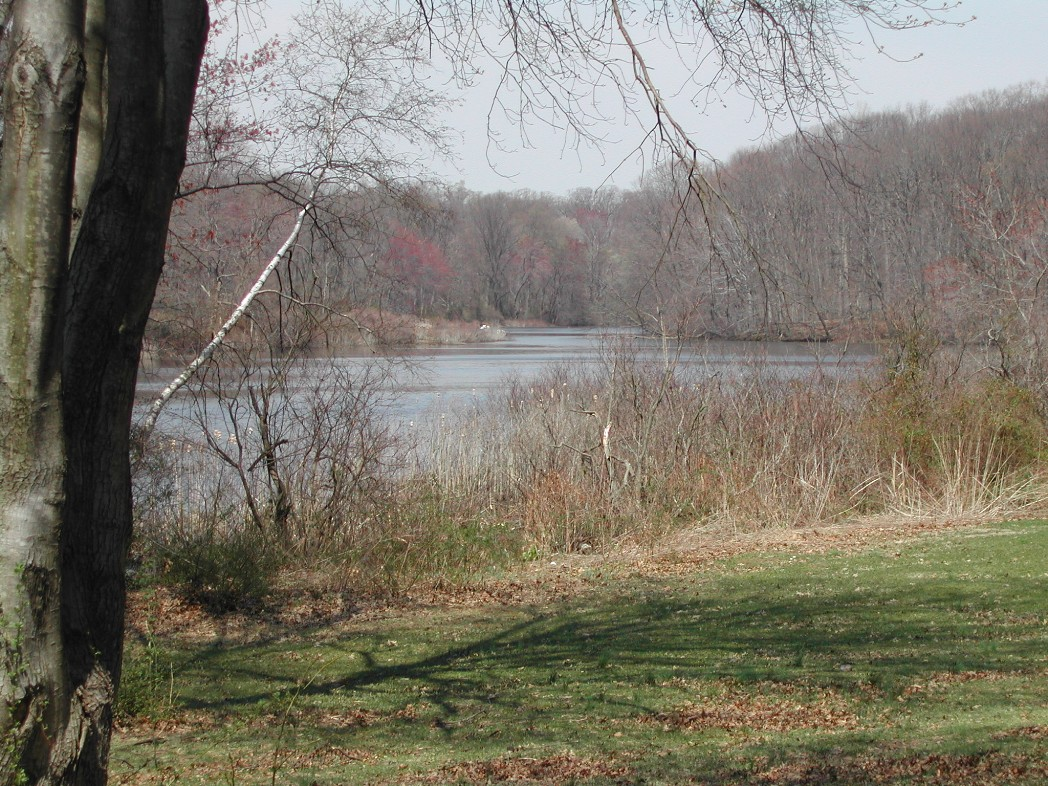
Lawrence Brook in Milltown

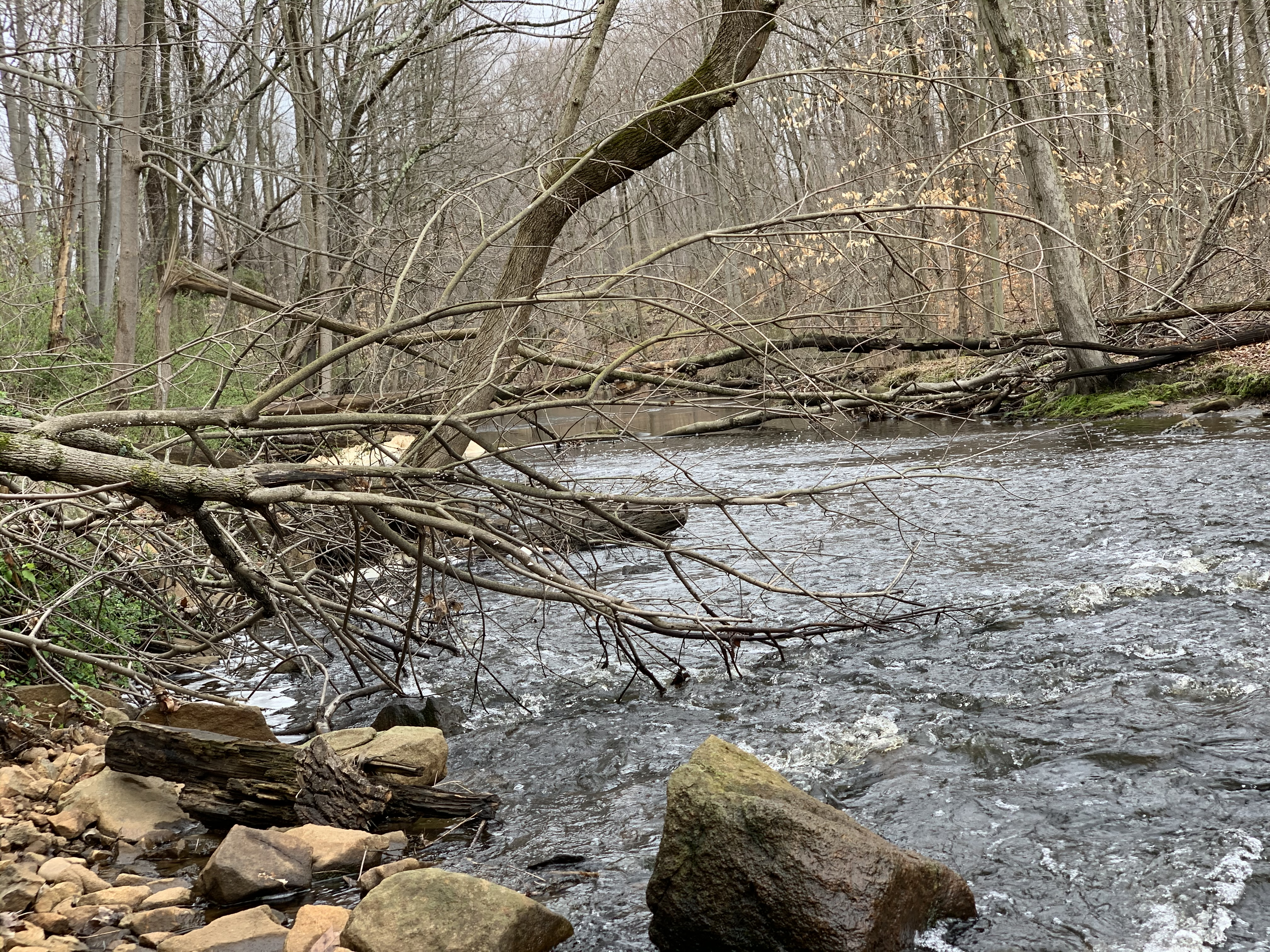
Lawrence Brook in South Brunswick

== Succession and pathway of Lawrence Brook ==
The Lawrence Brook, a 30-mile inland waterway (New Jersey), connects from the Raritan Bay to the lesser known end; splitting apart into two branches in South Brunswick, this is a list of important landmarks in Central New Jersey where the Lawrence Brook is present (sometimes in larger water-body forms).

- Atlantic Ocean (Starts Here, near the Raritan Bay)
- Raritan Bay to the Mouth of Raritan River (Near Perth Amboy, NJ and passes under the Governor Alfred E. Driscoll Bridge)
- Raritan River (Continues for about 3-5 Miles; it splits into a smaller branch of the Raritan River that passes to the left of Basilone Bridge)
- Raritan River (Turns Left Near the Weston's Mills Subdivision and passes near the Holiday Inn Express & Suites Tower Center)
- Westons Mills Pond (Continues South and intersects Ryders Lane in East Brunswick; near Rutgers Vegetable Garden)
- Lawrence Brook (Connects Westons Mills Pond to the Farrington Lake)
- Farrington Lake (This is the longest stretch of the Lawrence Brook [in the form of Farrington Lake] and passes through North Brunswick, NJ)
- Lawrence Brook (At the Intersection of Riva Avenue and Davidson's Mill Road, Lawrence Brook connects Farrington Lake to Davidson's Mill Pond in Deans, South Brunswick, NJ)
- Davidson's Mill Pond (Goes underneath US-130, and continually reduces in width; continues to Deans Pond North of the Deans Pond Crossing Subdivision [Deans Pond- Marsh; seasonally flooded]
- Lawrence Brook (Continues North and Northwest from the Crossroads Middle School; has been artificially drained under the Northeast Corridor Train Track and near the Southridge Woods Apartment Complex. Continues, during flooded seasons, approximately parallel to Freedom Trail in South Brunswick.)
- Lawrence Brook (Continues through South Brunswick, perpendicularly crosses the Northeast Corridor Train Track (drained) and then enters into a marsh)
- Lawrence Brook (Continues through the Marsh (Off Of New Road) and splits into two branches:
- 1: Intersects New Road, Continues Roughly Parallel to The Grande Subdivision, and connects with the Devils Brook into Lake McCormack Audubon’s Plainsboro Preserve
- 2: Continues Through Marsh, enters Forested Areas, and Ends North of the Tall Timbers Cricket Park in a Smaller Marsh.

== Parks along Lawrence Brook ==
- Davidsons Mill Pond County Park (South Brunswick)
- Ireland Brook County Park (South Brunswick and East Brunswick)
- Bicentennial Park (East Brunswick)
- North Brunswick Memorial Park (North Brunswick)
- Brook Park (Milltown)
- Mill Pond Park (Milltown)
- Rutgers Gardens and Helyar Woods (Rutgers, the State University of New Jersey)

== Main tributaries ==
- Brook from the beaver pond to Davidsons Mill Pond
- Ireland Brook
- Oakeys Brook
  - Cow Yard Brook, a branch of the Oakeys Brook
- Beaverdam Brook
- Sucker Brook
- Sawmill Brook
- Brook in Rutgers Gardens (along the bamboo forest), sometimes called Doc Brook
- Brook in Rutgers' Helyar Woods (with a small waterfall), sometimes called Helyar Brook
- Terhune Run
- Great Ditch

== See also ==
- List of rivers of New Jersey
