= Oakeys Brook (New Jersey) =

Tributary of a branch of the Raritan River

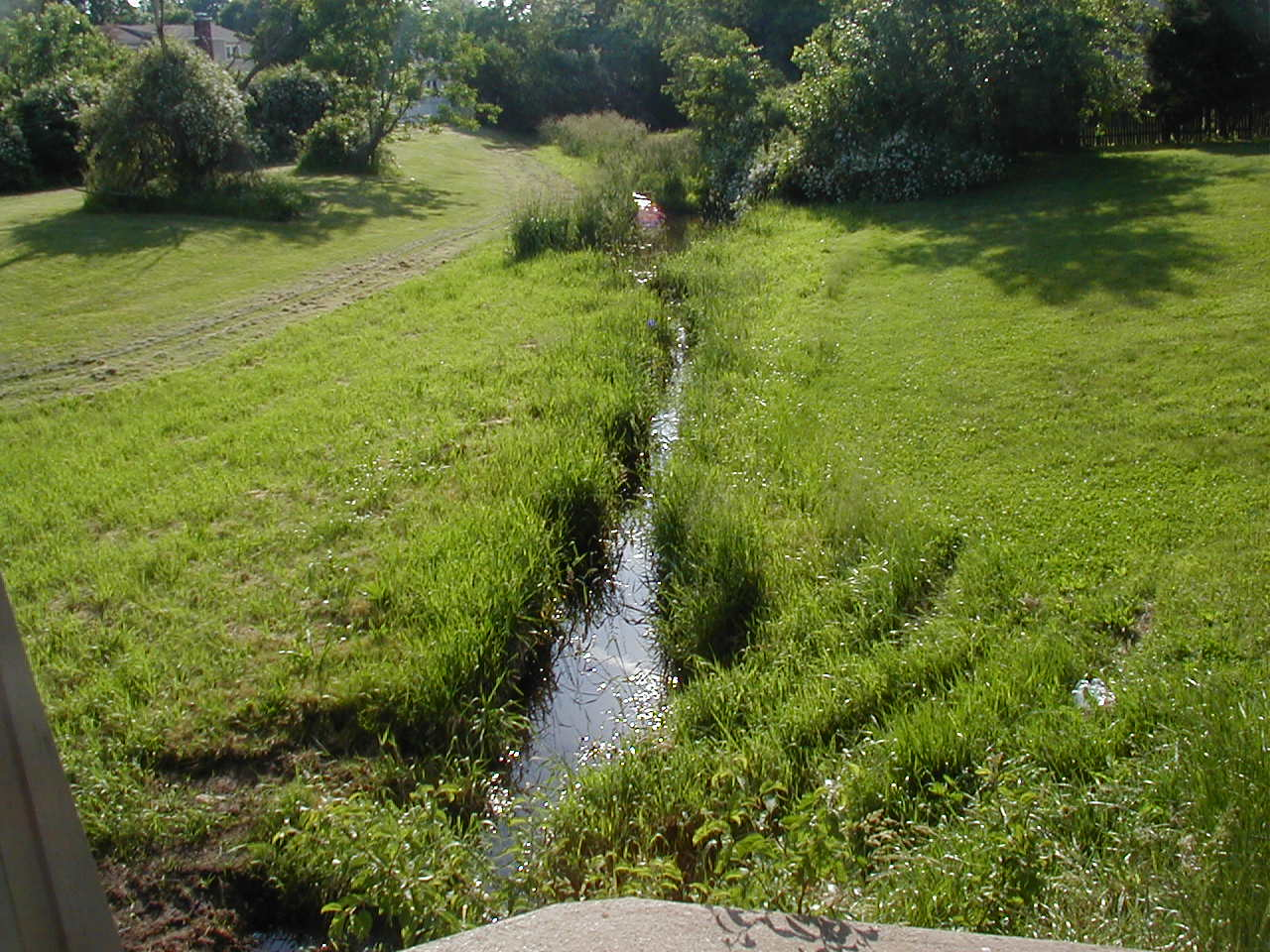
- Oakeys Brook near Brunswick Acres School in North Brunswick

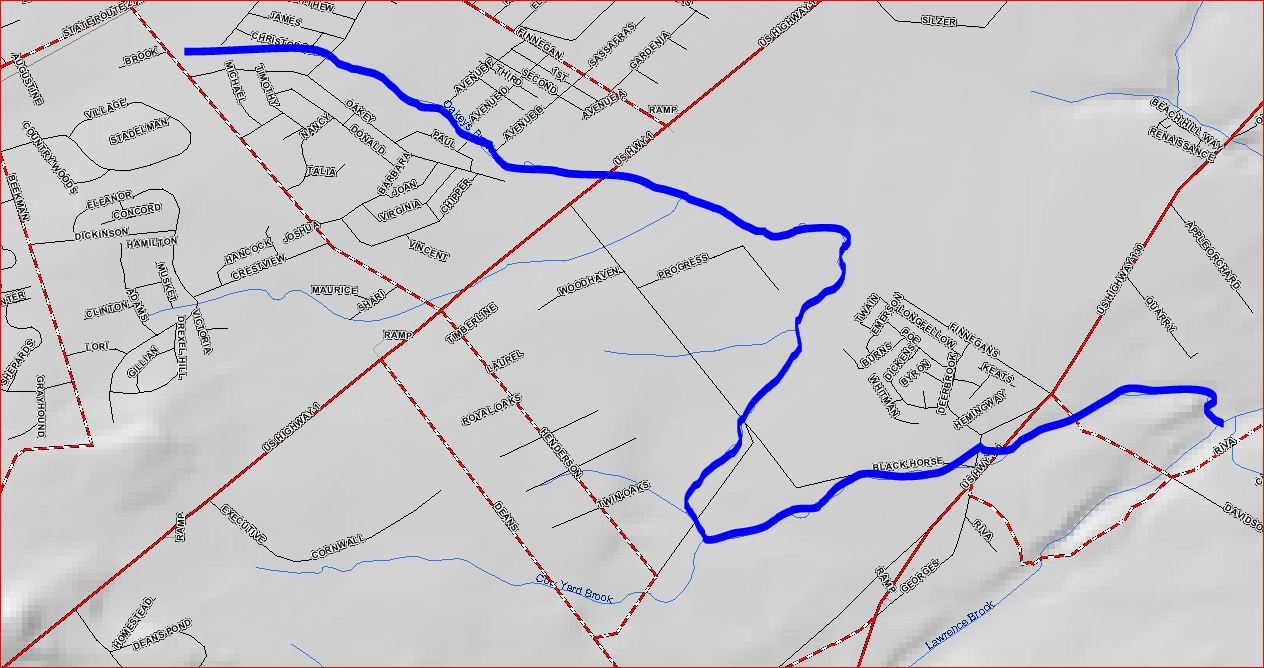
- Oakeys Brook map

Location
- Country: United States

Physical characteristics
- Source
  - coordinates: 40°25′56″N 74°32′39″W
- Mouth
  - coordinates: 40°25′06″N 74°29′29″W
  - elevation: 52 ft (16 m)

Basin features
- Progression: Lawrence Brook, Raritan River, Atlantic Ocean
- River system: Raritan River system
- Tributaries
  - left: Cow Yard Brook

Oakeys Brook is a tributary of Lawrence Brook, a branch of the Raritan River in Middlesex County, New Jersey in the United States.

== Course ==
The source of Oakeys Brook is near Beekman Road in central South Brunswick. Farther downstream, it runs through the Nassau Square housing development on Augustine Drive. Then it crosses Henderson Road in northern South Brunswick (which is its official source at 40°25′56″N 74°32′39″W), and runs beside the Brunswick Acres School in northern South Brunswick. It then crosses Route 1 and merges with another unnamed tributary. It continues flowing away from Black Horse Lane before coming toward it and crossing the railroad tracks a little farther north than the road reaches them. Another unnamed tributary joins it, along with Cow Yard Brook. It turns east, crosses Route 130 near Black Horse Lane, and crosses Davidson Mill Road before emptying into Farrington Lake, near Davidson Mill Road40°25′06″N 74°29′29″W.

== Animal life ==
Oakeys Brook is an ecosystem full of many varieties of life, despite its proximity to human habitation in many upstream areas. Many tadpoles and frogs live in the stream, especially upstream where natural dams sometimes create small ponds. Snakes and occasionally turtles may be found by the stream. Upstream, numerous species of small fish live in it, providing food for some birds which live there. The deer cross on planks of wood to get food. It is easy for people to cross, but crayfish can snap at your feet

== Accessibility ==
Oakeys Brook flows in many areas through developed sectors, where it is easily accessible. Students at Brunswick Acres are sometimes allowed to pick up the trash littered on the bank.

== Terrain ==
Oakeys Brook generally has a clay streambed. Upstream decay products turn the mud black, making it an ideal place for amphibians and turtles to hide in. Downstream, there are a few more rocks, although the stream is still muddy and deep. The stream flows through wetland areas in several places near Black Horse Lane.

This stream is generally low-lying, collecting water from various storm drainage systems. It is fed by swamp drainage and springs in the downstream areas but by storm drainage and farm drainage in upstream areas. Since a major source is storm drainage, it swells considerably during rains.

== Tributaries ==
- Cow Yard Brook

== Gallery ==
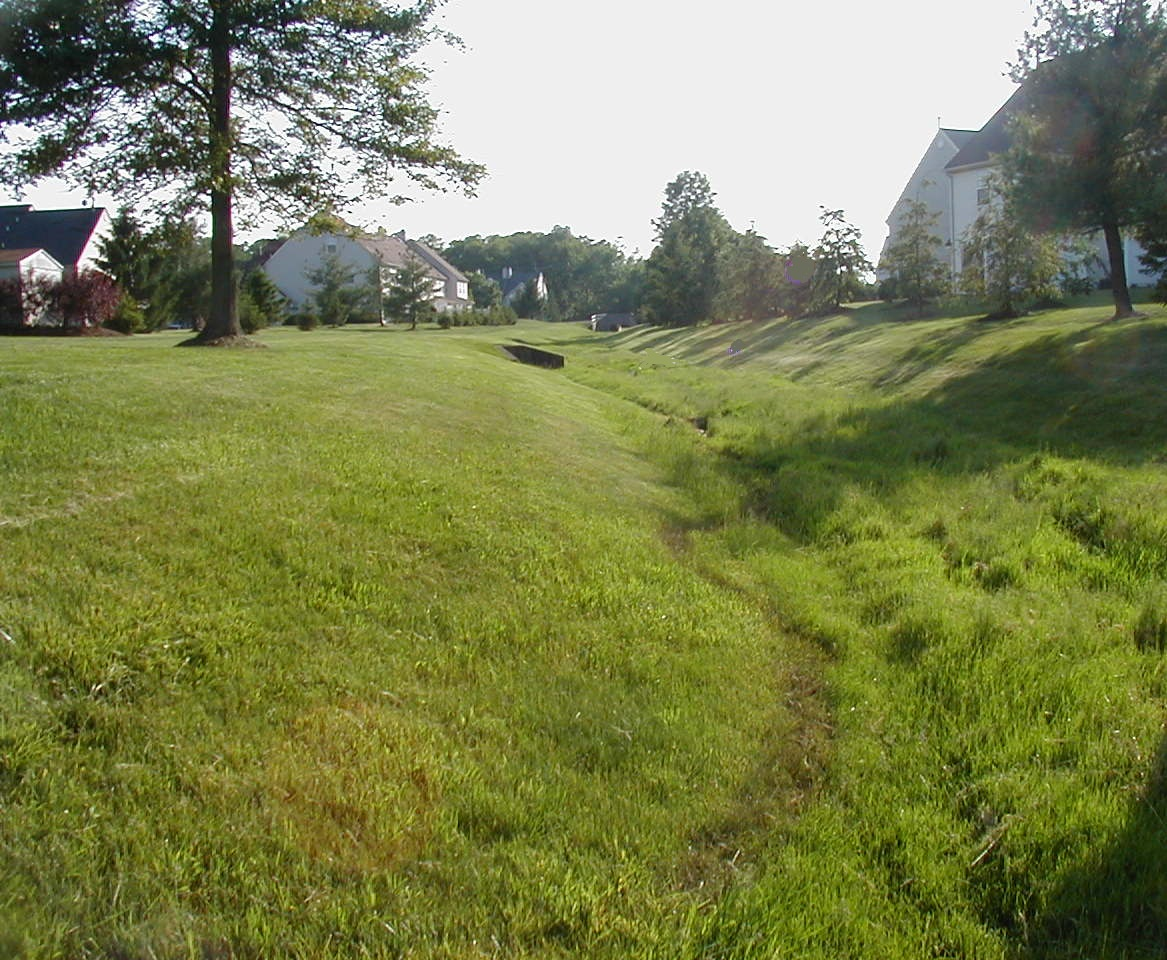
Oakeys Brook near its source, in the Nassau Square housing development

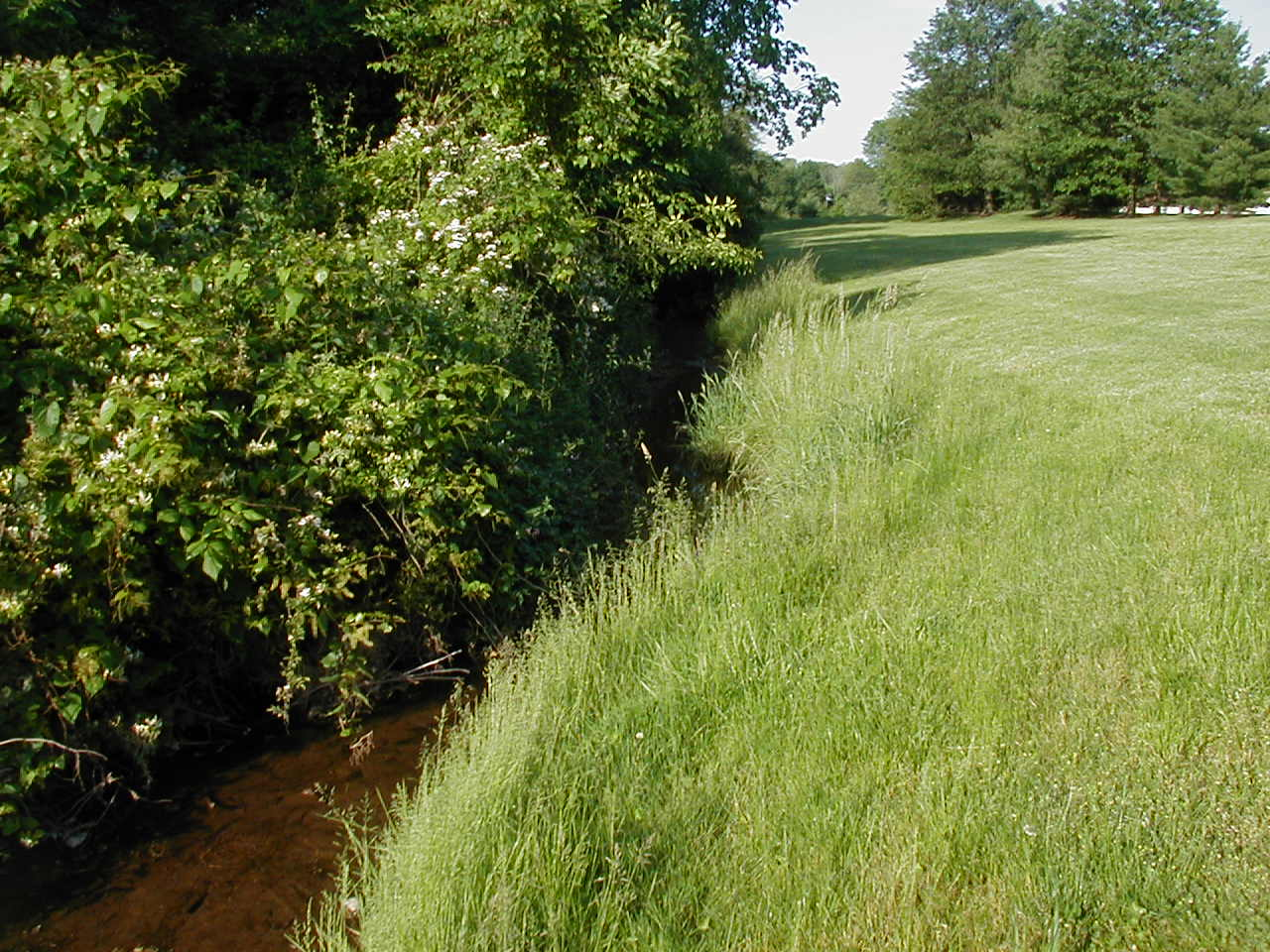
Oakeys Brook in Nassau Square a little downstream

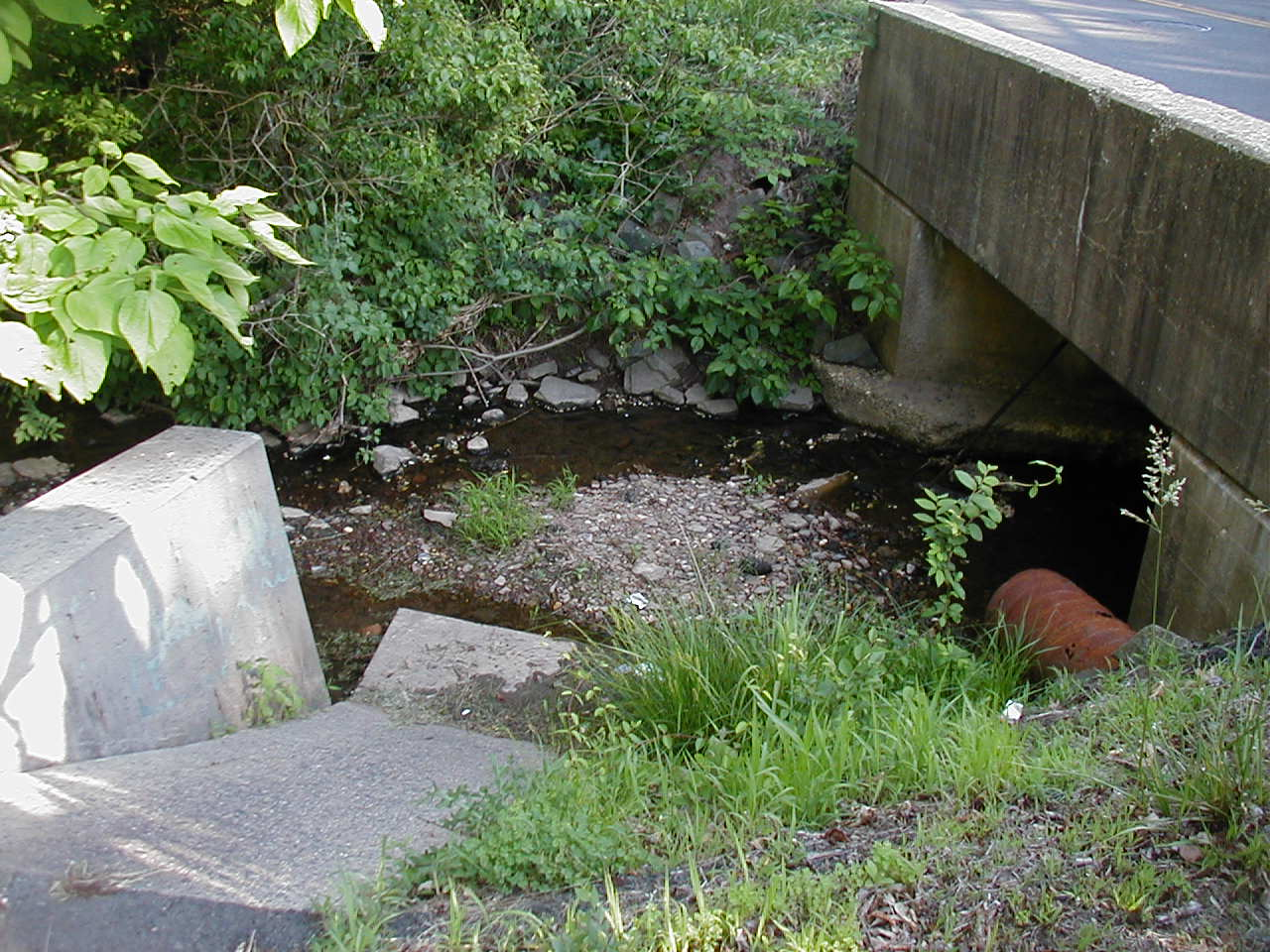
Oakeys Brook crossing Henderson Road

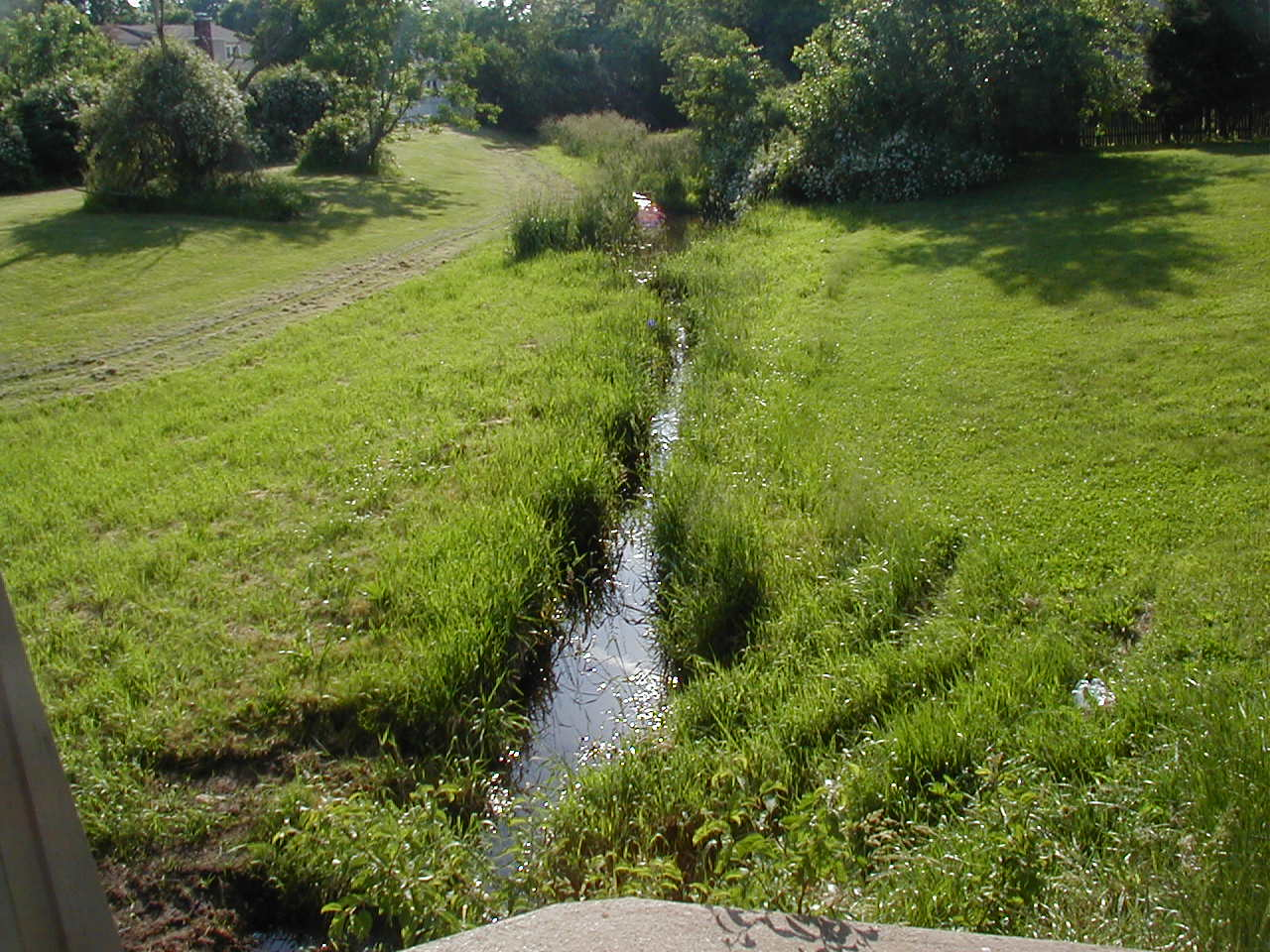
Oakeys Brook near Brunswick Acres Elementary School

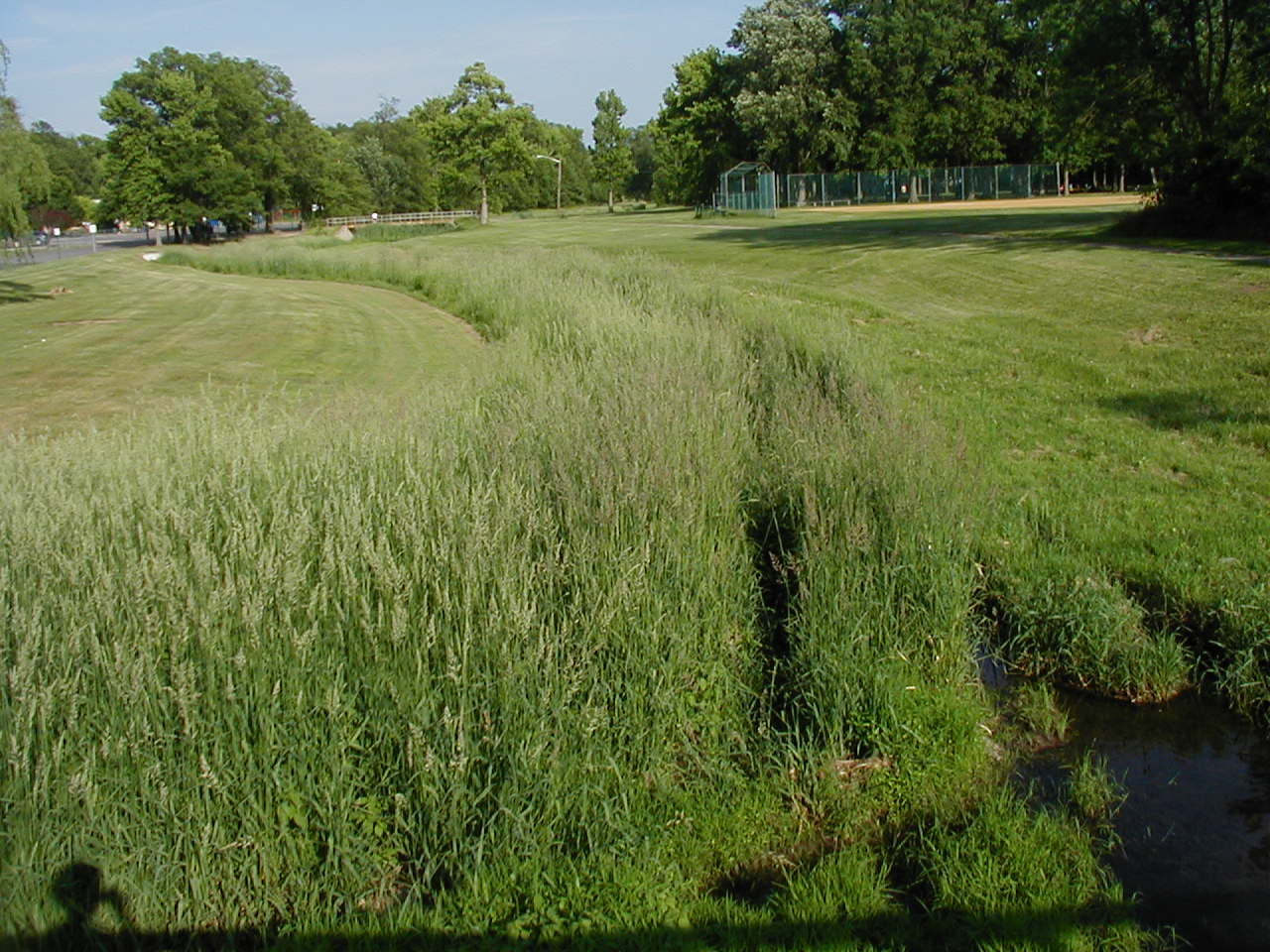
Oakeys Brook flowing through Brunswick Acres Elementary School in Kendall Park

== See also ==
- List of rivers of New Jersey
