= Skillman Park =

Park in New Jersey, United States

Coordinates: 40.415°N 74.691°W

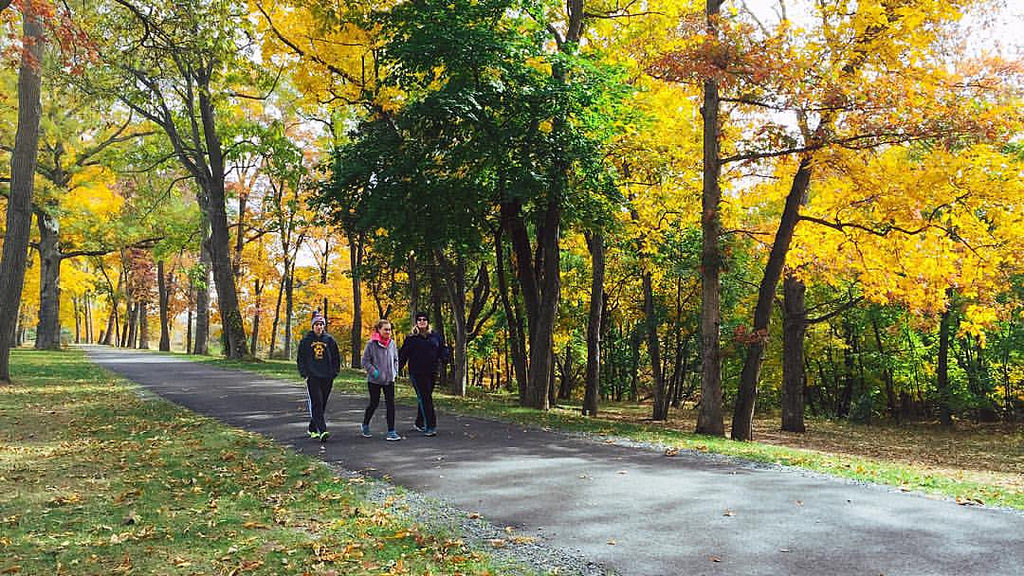
Residents walking in Skillman Park

Skillman Park is a public park in Skillman, part of Montgomery, Somerset County, New Jersey. It is operated by the Somerset County Park Commission. The park was opened in 2015.

The 247-acre area was bought by Somerset County from the township in 2011. It once housed Skillman Village. In the subsequent development of the park much of the original tree-lined layout by landscape architect Charles Leavitt from 1901 has been preserved; old buildings, however, were removed.

The park can be crossed by car and has multiple parking lots. It has a multi-use, asphalted 2.25 mile trail. A nature path runs along Rock Brook.
