= Dirck Gulick House =

- U.S. National Register of Historic Places
- New Jersey Register of Historic Places
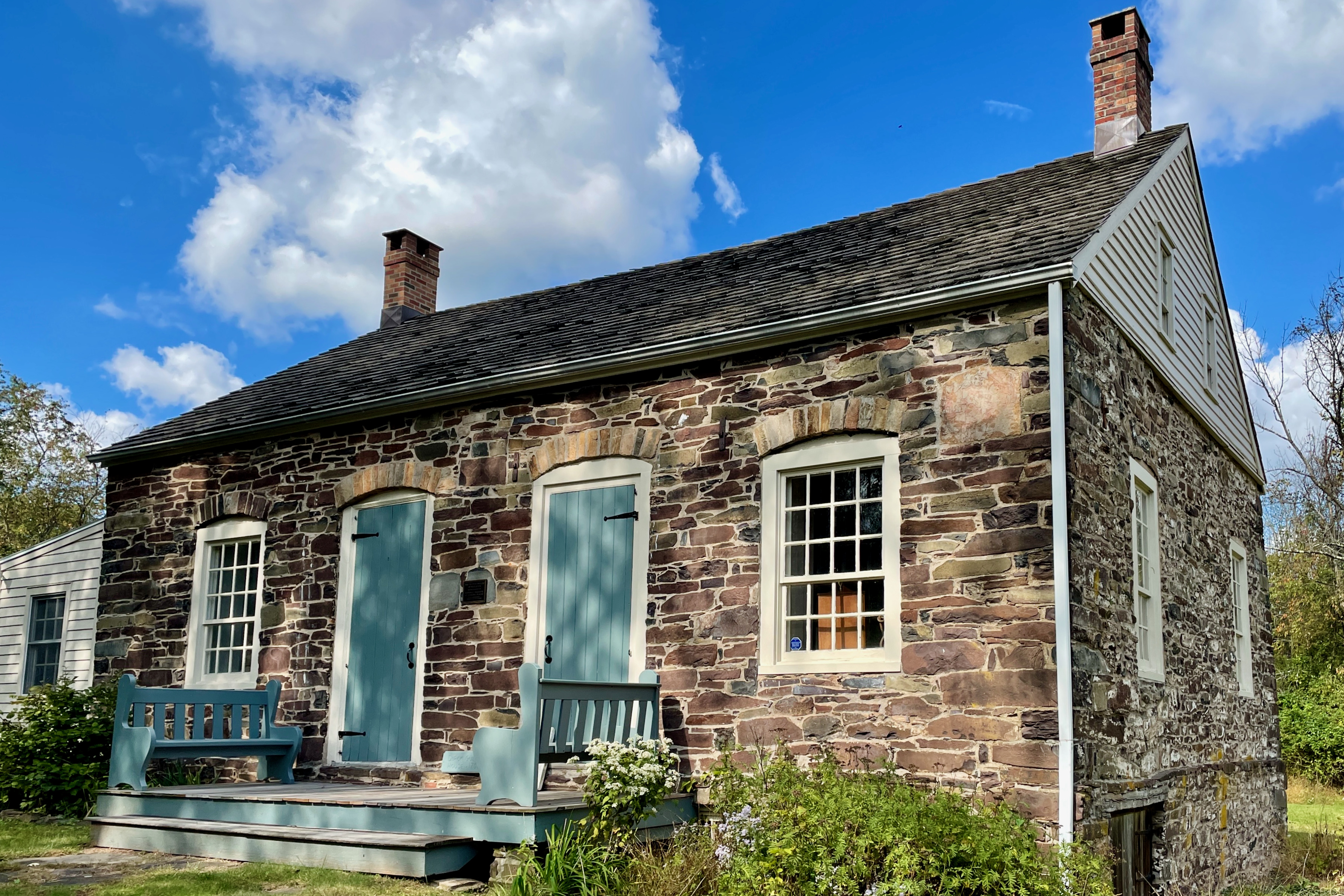
- Dirck Gulick House in 2021

- Location within Somerset County, New Jersey Location within New Jersey Location within the United States
- Location: 506 CR 601 (Belle Mead-Blawenburg Road), Montgomery Township, New Jersey
- Coordinates: 40°26′54″N 74°41′24″W
- Area: 8 acres (3.2 ha)
- Built: 1752
- Architectural style: Dutch Colonial / Dutch Vernacular
- NRHP reference No.: 03001285
- NJRHP No.: 2545

Significant dates
- Added to NRHP: December 11, 2003
- Designated NJRHP: October 28, 2003

The Dirck Gulick House is a historic stone house built in 1752 and located at 506 County Route 601 (Belle Mead-Blawenburg Road) in the Dutchtown section of Montgomery Township in Somerset County, New Jersey. The house was added to the National Register of Historic Places on December 11, 2003 for its significance in architecture and exploration/settlement. It is now operated as a historic house museum by the Van Harlingen Historical Society.

== History and description ==
The one and one-half story Dutch colonial house was built from fieldstone in 1752 by Dirck Gulick. He was married to Geertje Reed. A stone plaque on the exterior has their initials and the year built. The house features two separate entry doors and segmented stone arches over the doors and windows. Gulick was a deacon of the Harlingen Dutch Reformed Church. His sons, Hendrick and Guisbert Gulick, lived on the farm after his death. In 2004, it was acquired by the Van Harlingen Historical Society.

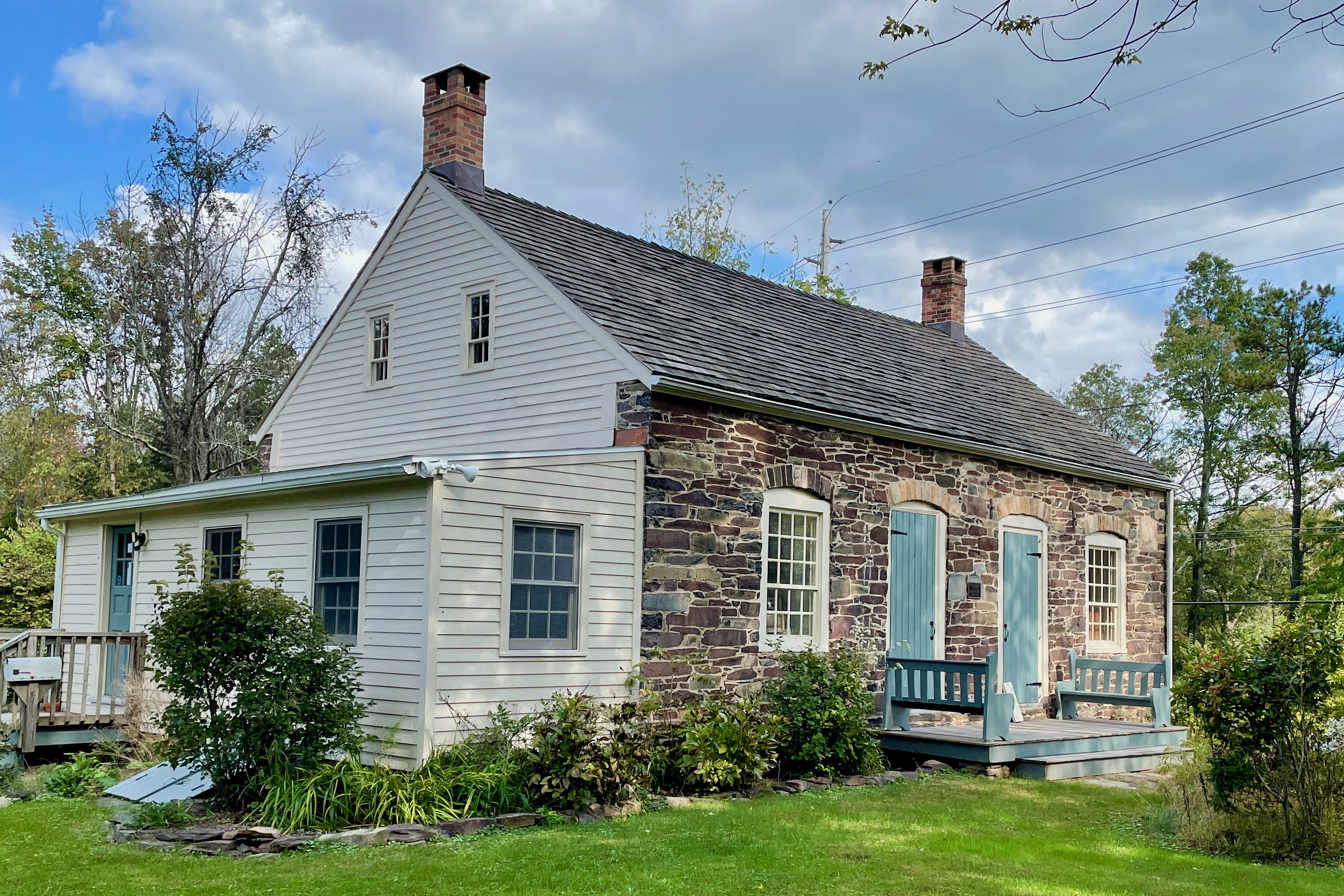
Looking northeast

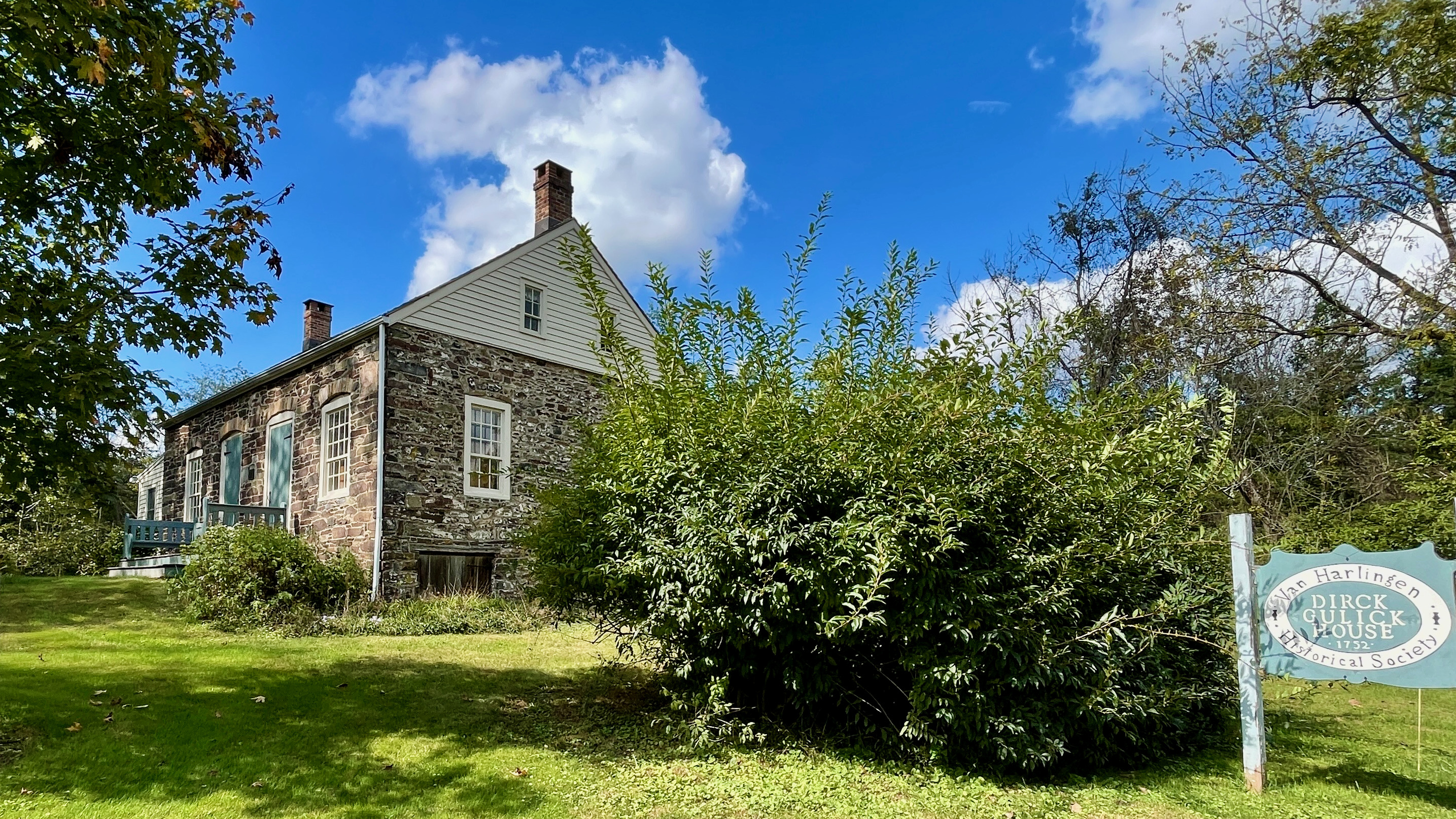
Area view shows Van Harlingen sign

== See also ==
- National Register of Historic Places listings in Somerset County, New Jersey
- List of the oldest buildings in New Jersey
- List of museums in New Jersey
