= Dutchtown, New Jersey =

Dutchtown, New Jersey may refer to:

- Dutchtown, Atlantic County, New Jersey
- Dutchtown, Somerset County, New Jersey
