= John P. Lewis =

American academic and presidential advisor (1921–2010)

John Prior Lewis (March 18, 1921 – May 26, 2010) was an American academic and presidential advisor who was a strong advocate of aid to help build developing countries as a matter of foreign policy.

Lewis was born on March 18, 1921, in Albany, New York. He was raised in Hudson Falls, New York and earned his undergraduate degree from Union College. Lewis later attended Harvard University, from which he received a Master of Public Administration and was awarded a Ph.D. in political economy and government. During World War II he served in the United States Navy.

Lewis was a staff member to the Chairman of the Council of Economic Advisers from 1950 to 1953. While he was a professor at Indiana University, he was named to serve on the three-man Council in December 1962 by President John F. Kennedy. President Lyndon B. Johnson named him in 1964 to head the United States Agency for International Development's efforts in India. From Indiana University he moved to Princeton University, where from 1969 to 1974 was the dean of Woodrow Wilson School of Public and International Affairs and, in early 80s, supported the appointment of Angus Deaton. President Jimmy Carter named him to chair the Organisation for Economic Co-operation and Development's development assistance committee.

Lewis was bothered by inequality in the United States and around the world, and was a strong advocate of the argument that aid to developing nations was a necessary component of American foreign policy, despite the budgetary costs and the potential for misuse, a position reflected in books he wrote and co-authored, including his 1995 book India’s Political Economy: Governance and Reform and his 1997 work The World Bank: Its First Half Century.

He died at age 89 of natural causes on May 26, 2010 in Montgomery Township, New Jersey, where he lived at the time of his death in a retirement community. He was survived by two daughters, six grandchildren; and two great-grandchildren. His wife, the former June Estelle Ryan, died in 2009, and a daughter died in 2008.
