= Roaring Brook (Cruser Brook tributary) =

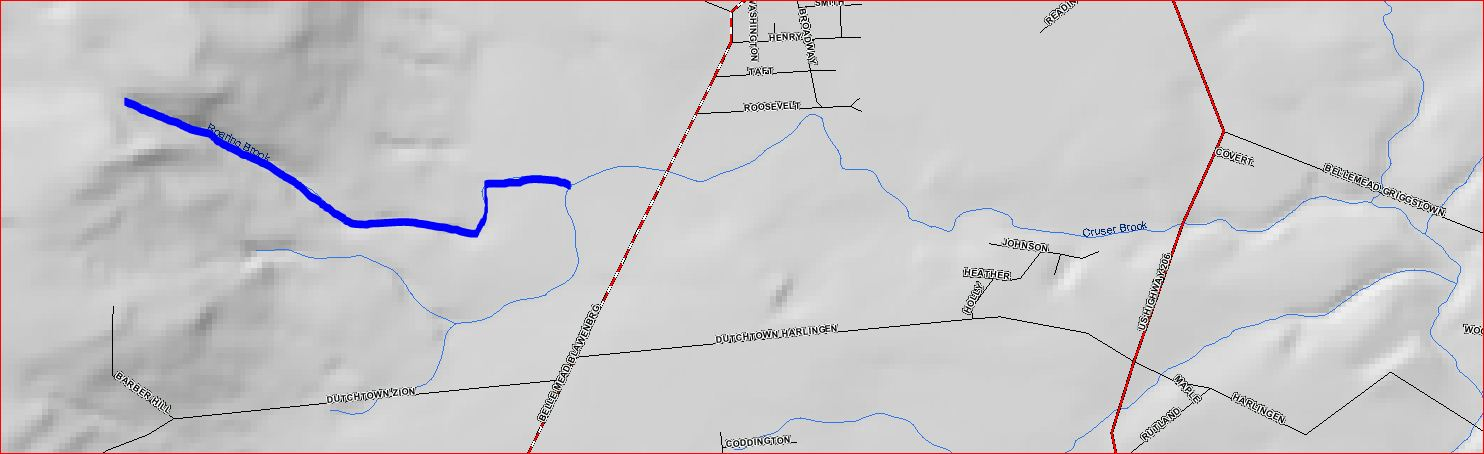
- Map of Roaring Brook

Location
- Country: United States

Physical characteristics
- Source
  - coordinates: 40°27′41″N 74°42′52″W
- Mouth
  - coordinates: 40°27′22″N 74°41′24″W
  - elevation: 98 ft (30 m)

Basin features
- Progression: Cruser Brook, Pike Run, Beden Brook, Millstone River, Raritan River, Atlantic Ocean
- River system: Raritan River system

Roaring Brook is a tributary of Cruser Brook in Somerset County, New Jersey, in the United States.

== Course ==
Roaring Brook starts at 40°27′41″N 74°42′52″W, on Sourland Mountain. It flows southeast until it joins Cruser Brook at the edge of Sourland Mountain at 40°27′22″N 74°41′24″W.

== See also ==
- List of rivers of New Jersey
