= Pike Run (New Jersey) =

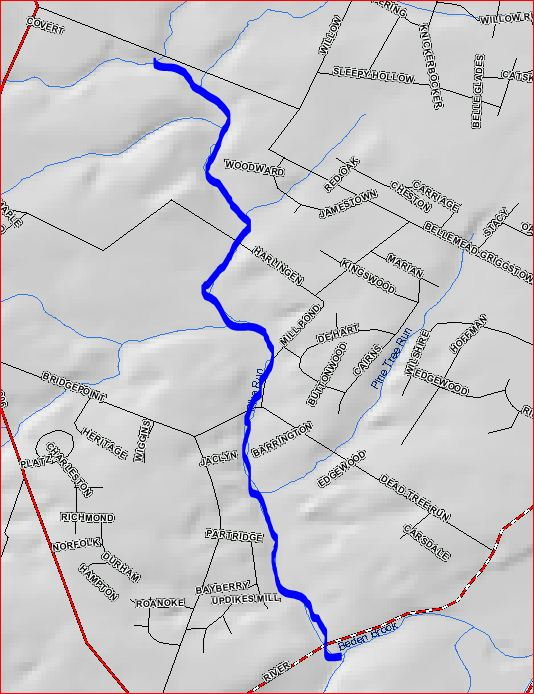
- Map of Pike Run

Location
- Country: United States

Physical characteristics
- Source
  - coordinates: 40°27′19″N 74°39′4″W
- Mouth
  - coordinates: 40°25′9″N 74°38′22″W
  - elevation: 43 ft (13 m)

Basin features
- Progression: Beden Brook, Millstone River, Raritan River, Atlantic Ocean
- River system: Raritan River system
- Tributaries
  - left: Pine Tree Run
  - right: Back Brook, Cruser Brook

Pike Run, also known as North Pike Run, is a tributary of Beden Brook in Somerset County, New Jersey in the United States. It is the namesake for the nearby residential development of Pike Run in Belle Mead, New Jersey.

== Course ==
Pike Run starts at 40°27′19″N 74°39′4″W, near the intersection of Route 206 and Belle Mead-Griggstown Road. The stream does not have a specific source. One source is at the eastern edge of the Sourland Mountains, while another branch passes through the Pike Brook Country Club(now the Mattawang Golf Club)from its origins on the northeastern edge of the Sourlands. Cruser Brook joins it, and it flows south and joins Back Brook and Pine Tree Run. It then crosses River Road and drains into Beden Brook at 40°25′9″N 74°38′22″W.

== Tributaries ==
- Pine Tree Run
- Back Brook
  - Branch Back Brook
- Cruser Brook
  - Roaring Brook

== Sister tributary ==
- Rock Brook

== See also ==
- List of rivers of New Jersey
- Millstone River
