= Skillman, New Jersey =

Populated place in Somerset County, New Jersey, US

- Census-designated place
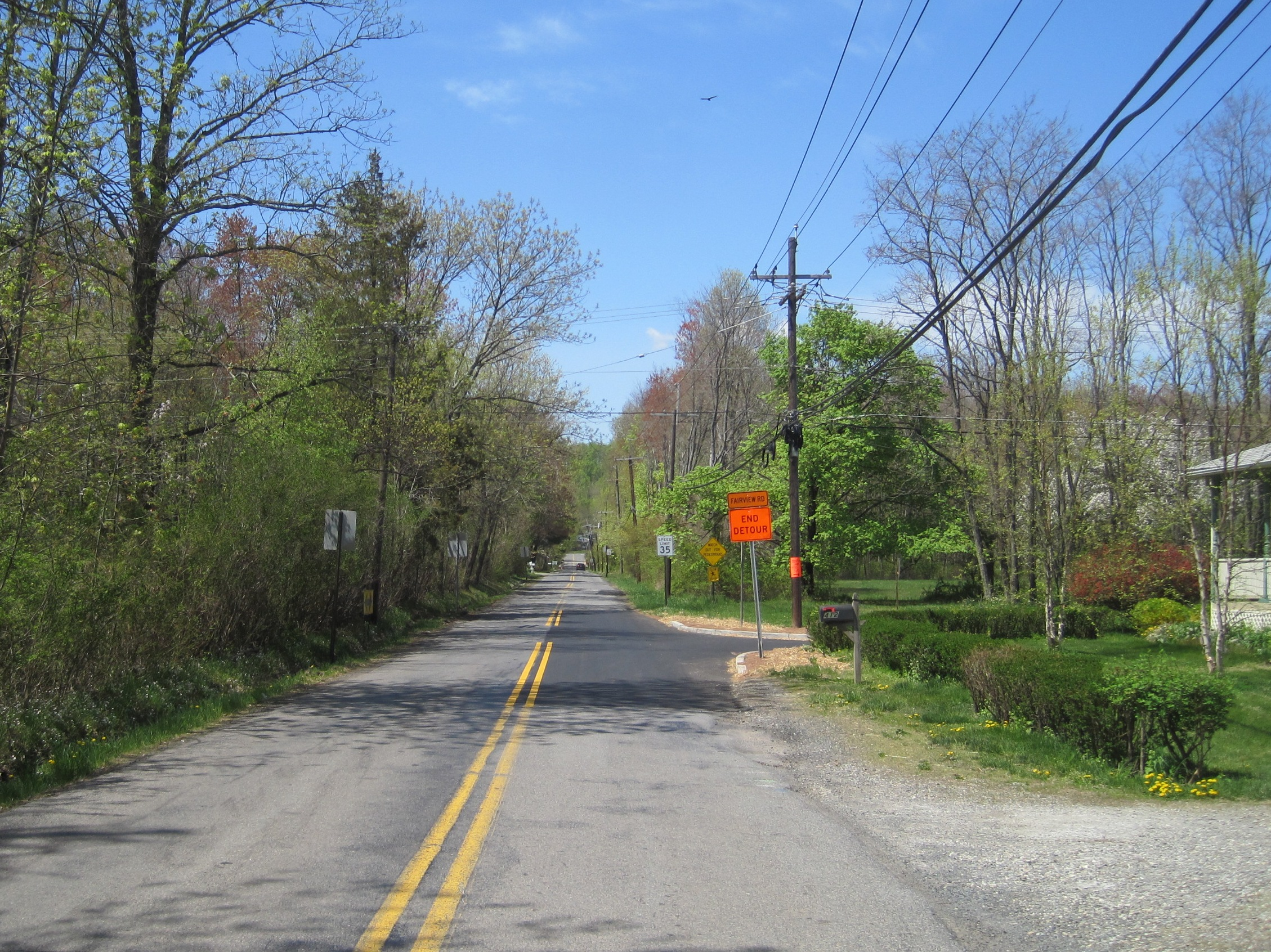
- Skillman as seen from the intersection of Camp Meeting Avenue and Fairview Road

- Location in Somerset County Location in New Jersey Location in the United States
- Coordinates: 40.428191°N 74.712293°W
- Country: United States
- State: New Jersey
- County: Somerset
- Township: Montgomery
- Named for: Skillman family

Area
  - Total: 1.47 sq mi (3.82 km^{2})
  - Land: 1.47 sq mi (3.80 km^{2})
  - Water: 0.012 sq mi (0.03 km^{2}) 0.69%
- Elevation: 138 ft (42 m)

Population (2020)
  - Total: 237
  - Density: 162/sq mi (62.4/km^{2})
- Time zone: UTC−05:00 (Eastern (EST))
  - Summer (DST): UTC−04:00 (Eastern (EDT))
- ZIP Code: 08558
- Area codes: 609/640 and 732/848
- FIPS code: 34-67860
- GNIS feature ID: 02584029

Skillman is an unincorporated community and census-designated place (CDP) located within Montgomery Township, in Somerset County, in the U.S. state of New Jersey. As of the 2020 United States census, the CDP's population was 237, down from 242 at the 2010 census.

The area is served as United States Postal Service ZIP Code 08558. However, the Skillman postal address covers an area significantly larger than the Skillman CDP. The Skillman postal address services approximately half of the 32 square miles (83 km^{2}) and approximately 23,000 residents comprising Montgomery Township. The small CDP designated as Skillman and the much larger area known as Skillman based on the post office delivery area (which encompasses the Skillman CDP), are not the same.

The Skillman postal area is home to Kenvue's (formerly Johnson & Johnson's) Consumer Products division and Bloomberg L.P. Financial's offices.

All of the public school buildings (elementary, middle and high schools) for Montgomery Township are located in the Skillman postal area.

== History ==
Skillman is named after the Skillman family. The first Skillmans were Dutch, but lived in England before moving to Brooklyn in 1664, according to family accounts. In 1729, Thomas Skillman ventured westward, buying some 500 acres (2.0 km^{2}) of farmland on the Millstone River, near the village of Rocky Hill, for his sons, Jan and Isaac. That purchase was the Skillman family's entry into Montgomery. The Skillman area got its name when the railroads arrived in the 1870s, according to the Skillman family. Joseph A. Skillman, was a teamster who owned "wild Missouri mules," according to family accounts. When railroad workers were trying to lay tracks, their horses got bogged down in thick, clay mud, and Joseph A. Skillman came to the rescue with his mules. Railroad officials also socialized at the home of another Skillman nearby, and the new train station was named for the family. A post office opened in the station and a small village, with a hay press, feed store and hardware store, sprouted around it. It took the Skillman name, too. (While the train station is gone, remnants of the village still exist at the spot where Camp Meeting Avenue and Skillman Road meet. A clay and sculpting supply business occupies some of the buildings.) Also in Skillman was the sprawling New Jersey State Village for Epileptics, a 250-acre (1.0 km^{2}) complex opened around 1900 that had its own dairy, laundry, and movie theater. Visitors would arrive by train. Skillman was a busy little country place. There were 1,637 residents in Montgomery in 1910, compared with more than 23,000 now, according to Census data. The community now has more traffic, fewer farms and more houses (specifically developments).

In 2011, Montgomery Township sold what remained of the North Princeton Developmental Center (also known as Skillman Village) to Somerset County in order for the village to be demolished.

== Geography ==
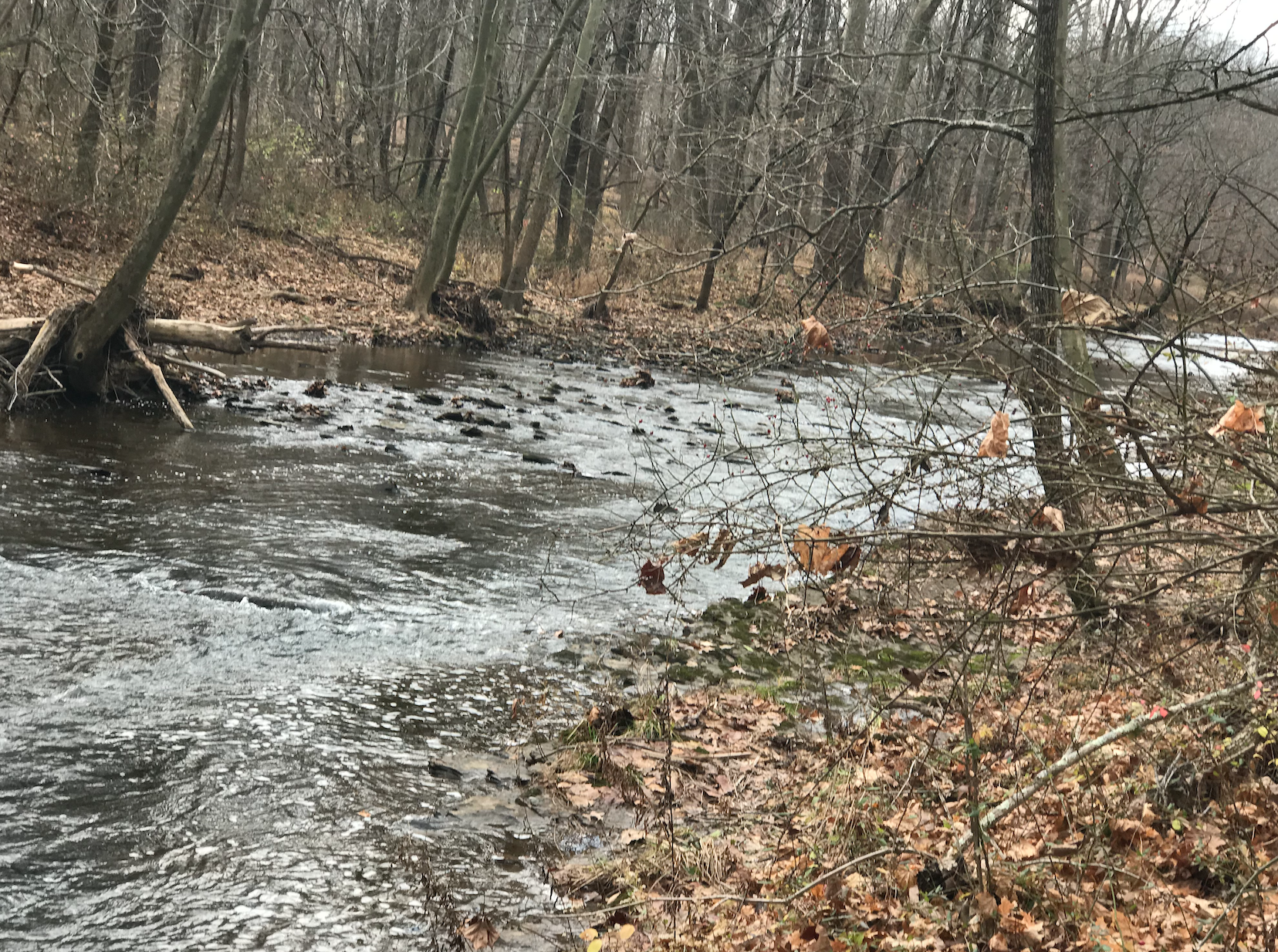
Rock Brook flowing through Bessie Grover Park in Skillman.

According to the United States Census Bureau, the CDP had a total area of 1.476 square miles (3.824 km^{2}), including 1.466 square miles (3.798 km^{2}) of land and 0.010 square miles (0.026 km^{2}) of water (0.69%).

== Demographics ==
Historical population
Census	Pop.	Note	%±
2010	242		—
2020	237		−2.1%
Population sources: 2010

Skillman first appeared as a census designated place in the 2010 U.S. census.

=== 2020 census ===
Skillman CDP, New Jersey – Racial and ethnic composition Note: the US Census treats Hispanic/Latino as an ethnic category. This table excludes Latinos from the racial categories and assigns them to a separate category. Hispanics/Latinos may be of any race.
Race / Ethnicity (NH = Non-Hispanic)	Pop 2010	Pop 2020	% 2010	% 2020
White alone (NH)	213	170	88.02%	71.73%
Black or African American alone (NH)	1	15	0.41%	6.33%
Native American or Alaska Native alone (NH)	1	0	0.41%	0.00%
Asian alone (NH)	6	23	2.48%	9.70%
Native Hawaiian or Pacific Islander alone (NH)	0	0	0.00%	0.00%
Other race alone (NH)	0	2	0.00%	0.84%
Mixed race or Multiracial (NH)	6	13	2.48%	5.49%
Hispanic or Latino (any race)	15	14	6.20%	5.91%
Total	242	237	100.00%	100.00%

=== 2010 census ===
The 2010 United States census counted 242 people, 87 households, and 72 families in the CDP. The population density was 165.0 per square mile (63.7/km^{2}). There were 99 housing units at an average density of 67.5 per square mile (26.1/km^{2}). The racial makeup was 91.32% (221) White, 0.41% (1) Black or African American, 0.41% (1) Native American, 2.48% (6) Asian, 0.00% (0) Pacific Islander, 2.89% (7) from other races, and 2.48% (6) from two or more races. Hispanic or Latino of any race were 6.20% (15) of the population.

Of the 87 households, 35.6% had children under the age of 18; 72.4% were married couples living together; 8.0% had a female householder with no husband present and 17.2% were non-families. Of all households, 12.6% were made up of individuals and 6.9% had someone living alone who was 65 years of age or older. The average household size was 2.78 and the average family size was 3.06.

23.1% of the population were under the age of 18, 3.3% from 18 to 24, 20.2% from 25 to 44, 38.8% from 45 to 64, and 14.5% who were 65 years of age or older. The median age was 47.0 years. For every 100 females, the population had 98.4 males. For every 100 females ages 18 and older there were 91.8 males.

== Notable people ==
People who were born in, residents of, or otherwise closely associated with Skillman include:

- Sara Josephine Baker (1873–1945), pioneering physician who was a resident of Trevenna Farm with Wylie
- Ira Black (1941–2006), neuroscientist and stem cell researcher who served as the first director of the Stem Cell Institute of New Jersey
- Yvonne Brill (1924–2013), rocket scientist
- Louis Gambaccini (1931–2018), government official who spent his career in the area of transportation
- Nicholas Katzenbach (1922–2012), lawyer who served as United States Attorney General during the Presidency of Lyndon B. Johnson
- John Sheridan (1942–2014), former commissioner of the New Jersey Department of Transportation and head of Cooper Health System, who lived in Skillman along with his wife at the time of their controversial deaths
- I. A. R. Wylie (1885–1959), popular writer; resident of Trevenna Farm with Baker
