= Ira Black =

American physician and neuroscientist (1941–2006)

Ira Barrie Black (March 18, 1941 – January 10, 2006) was an American physician and neuroscientist who was an advocate of stem cell research and was the first director of the Stem Cell Institute of New Jersey at Robert Wood Johnson Medical School which was created to advance research in the field.

== Early life and education ==
Born in the Bronx on March 18, 1941, Black graduated from the Bronx High School of Science. He majored in philosophy at Columbia University and received his M.D. from Harvard Medical School in 1965.

== Professional career ==
He was on the faculty of the Weill Cornell Medical College of Cornell University from 1975 to 1990, serving as the Chief of its Laboratory of Developmental Neurology as the Nathan Cummings Professor of Neurology. In 1990 he became the Chair of the Department of Neuroscience and Cell Biology at the UMDNJ-Robert Wood Johnson Medical School.

Black was an advocate for research using stem cells to repair damage from such conditions as cancer and Alzheimer's disease and his own research showed that the technique could be used to encourage the body's own stem cells to create needed new cells and as a form of gene therapy. Studies he performed in 2000 that were published in the Journal of Neuroscience Research showed that when an antioxidant was added to stem cells extracted from bone marrow, the undifferentiated stem cells transformed into cells with the characteristics of neurons within minutes and were successfully transplanted into the brains and spinal cords of rats. The results were called "an incredible achievement" in opening the path to creating treatments for conditions that had been previously untreatable by using stem cells to create needed cells of different forms. Black's approach was to use neurons developed from the individual's own adult stem cells to avoid issues of transplant rejection without requiring modifications to the genome, while avoiding the ethical concerns raised with the use of embryonic stem cells.

The Stem Cell Institute of New Jersey, formed following the passage of legislation in 2004 making New Jersey the second state in the nation to approve stem cell research, named him as its first director. Affiliated with the University of Medicine and Dentistry of New Jersey, he served there as chairman of the department of neuroscience and cell biology. As director of the Stem Cell Institute, he expressed his frustration with federal opposition to embryonic stem cell research, stating that the therapies that could result from such studies had the potential to "get patients out of bed and out of wheelchairs" and that the researchers in the U.S. were trailing those elsewhere who were able to make further progress in their studies.

In 1992, Black served a term as president of the Society for Neuroscience. Published works include his 1991 book Information in the Brain: A Molecular Perspective and the 2002 publication of The Changing Brain: Alzheimer's Disease and Advances in Neuroscience.

== Personal ==
A resident of the Skillman section of Montgomery Township and of Andes, New York, Black died at age 64 of sepsis related to a cancerous tumor on January 10, 2006, at the Hospital of the University of Pennsylvania in Philadelphia. He is survived by his son, Reed, and his wife of thirty years, Janet Lindquist Black. The couple divorced in 1999.
