= Cat Tail Brook =

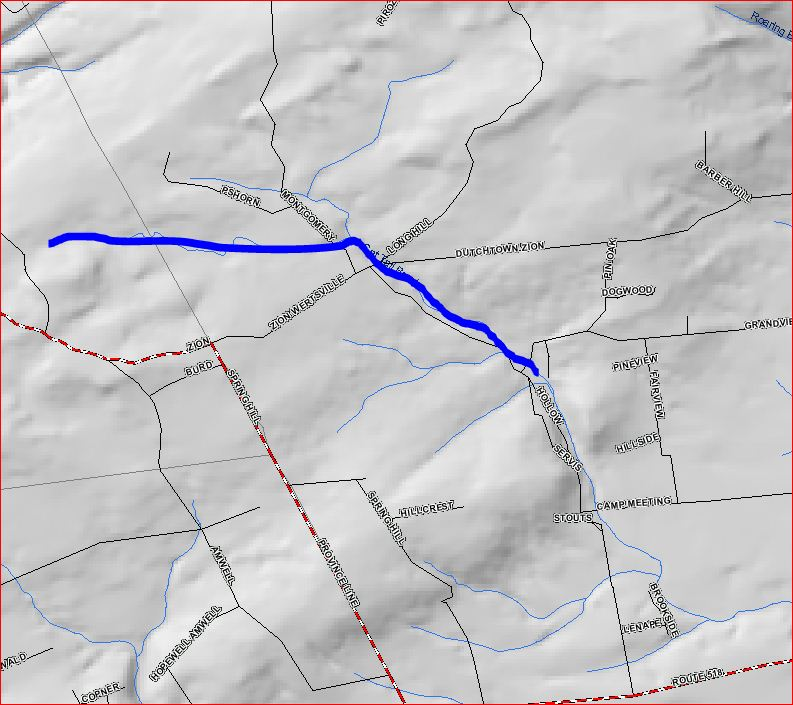
- Map of Cat Tail Brook

Location
- Country: United States

Physical characteristics
- Source
  - coordinates: 40°26′26″N 74°46′2″W
- Mouth
  - coordinates: 40°25′55″N 74°43′44″W
  - elevation: 220 ft (67 m)

Basin features
- Progression: Rock Brook, Beden Brook, Millstone River, Raritan River, Atlantic Ocean
- River system: Raritan River system

Cat Tail Brook is a tributary of Rock Brook in central New Jersey in the United States.

== Course ==
Cat Tail Brook originates in Sourland Mountain at 40°26′26″N 74°46′2″W. It flows southeast until it meets Rock Brook at the edge of Sourland Mountain at 40°25′55″N 74°43′44″W.

== See also ==
- List of rivers of New Jersey
