= Sadaf Jaffer =

Member of the New Jersey General Assembly

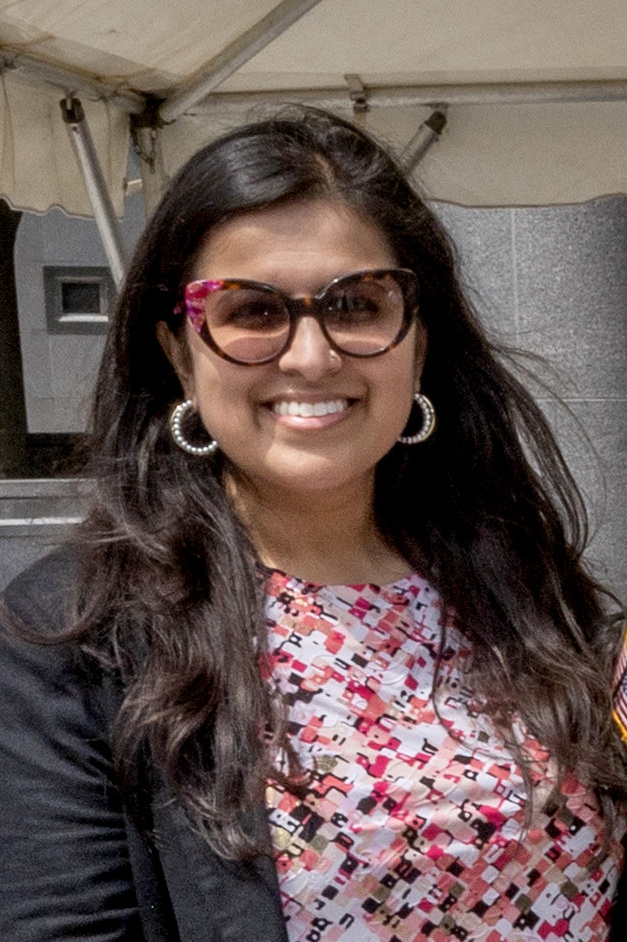

Member of the New Jersey General Assembly from the 16th district
- In office January 11, 2022 – January 9, 2024 Serving with Roy Freiman
- Preceded by: Andrew Zwicker
- Succeeded by: Mitchelle Drulis

Mayor of Montgomery Township
- In office January 3, 2019 – December 31, 2020
- Preceded by: Mark Conforti
- Succeeded by: Devra Keenan

Personal details
- Born: February 19, 1983 (age 43) Chicago, Illinois, U.S.
- Party: Democratic
- Spouse: Daniel Sheffield
- Children: 1
- Education: Georgetown University (BS); Harvard University (PhD)
- Website: Legislative webpage

Sadaf F. Jaffer (born February 19, 1983) is an American academic and politician who represented the 16th Legislative District in the New Jersey General Assembly from 2022 to 2024. She is a postdoctoral research associate at the Princeton Institute for International and Regional Studies.

Jaffer previously served two one-year terms as mayor of Montgomery Township, having taken office on January 3, 2019, and completing her term on December 31, 2020. She is the first woman of South Asian descent to serve as mayor of a town in New Jersey, and the first Muslim woman to serve as a mayor in the United States. Jaffer was first elected to Montgomery's Township Committee in 2017. She did not seek re-election in the 2023 New Jersey General Assembly election for personal reasons.

== Early life, family and education ==
Jaffer was born in Chicago to South Asian Muslim immigrants. Her mother was born in Pakistan and her father was born in Yemen to Indian parents. Her ancestors are originally from the Kutch region of western India. She attended the Latin School of Chicago, earned a bachelor's degree in foreign service from the School of Foreign Service at Georgetown University, and a PhD in near-eastern languages and civilizations from Harvard University.

In 2011, Jaffer married Daniel Sheffield, an assistant professor in the Near-Eastern Studies Department at Princeton University. They had met at Harvard and have one child.

== Mayor of Montgomery Township ==
In 2016, Jaffer launched an unsuccessful write-in campaign for Montgomery Township Committee. The following year she won a seat on the Township Committee on the Democratic ticket. In 2019, she was appointed to the position as mayor by her fellow committee members. She was sworn in on January 3, 2019, becoming the first woman of South Asian descent to serve as mayor of a town in New Jersey, and the first Muslim woman to serve as a mayor in the United States.

== New Jersey General Assembly ==
Jaffer ran for New Jersey General Assembly in the 16th district after incumbent Andrew Zwicker decided to run for New Jersey State Senate. She was endorsed by several progressive groups, including #VOTEPROCHOICE. After trailing behind Republican Vinny Panico for the second Assembly seat by nearly 300 votes in data published the night of the election she won alongside Roy Freiman in the final results, more than 2,500 votes ahead of Panico.

=== Committees ===
Committee assignments for the current session are:

- Education
- Health
- State and Local Government

=== District 16 ===
Each of the 40 districts in the New Jersey Legislature has one representative in the New Jersey Senate and two members in the New Jersey General Assembly. The representatives from the 16th District for the 2022—23 Legislative Session are:

- Senator Andrew Zwicker (D)
- Assemblyman Roy Freiman (D)
- Assemblywoman Sadaf Jaffer (D)

=== Electoral history ===
16th Legislative District Democratic Primary, 2021
Party	Candidate	Votes	%
Democratic	Sadaf F. Jaffer	9,383	44.2%
Democratic	Roy Freiman (incumbent)	8,889	41.8%
Democratic	Faris Zwirahn	2,979	14.0%
Total votes		21,251	100.0%

16th Legislative District General Election, 2021
Party	Candidate	Votes	%
Democratic	Roy Freiman (incumbent)	40,992	26.67%
Democratic	Sadaf F. Jaffer	39,512	25.71%
Republican	Vincent T. Panico	36,924	24.03%
Republican	Joseph A. Lukac III	36,251	23.59%
Total votes		153,679	100.0
Democratic hold			
