= Back Brook (New Jersey) =

Location
- Country: United States

Physical characteristics
- Source
  - coordinates: 40°26′34″N 74°42′36″W
- Mouth
  - coordinates: 40°26′22″N 74°38′46″W
  - elevation: 56 ft (17 m)

Basin features
- Progression: Pike Run, Beden Brook, Millstone River, Raritan River, Atlantic Ocean
- River system: Raritan River system
- Tributaries
  - right: Branch Back Brook

Back Brook is a tributary of Pike Run in Somerset County, New Jersey in the United States. It is located on the east side of Sourland Mountain.

== Course ==
Back Brook starts at 40°26′34″N 74°42′36″W, on the edge of Sourland Mountain. It flows eastward, crossing Blawenburg-Belle Mead Road and Sunset Road before running through Schuss Woods and the McAlpin Farm Easement. It then crosses Route 206 and flows through Oxbridge before entering Pike Run at 40°26′22″N 74°38′46″W.

== Tributaries ==
- Branch Back Brook

== Sister tributaries ==
- Cruser Brook
- Pine Tree Run

== See also ==
- List of rivers of New Jersey
