= Pine Tree Run =

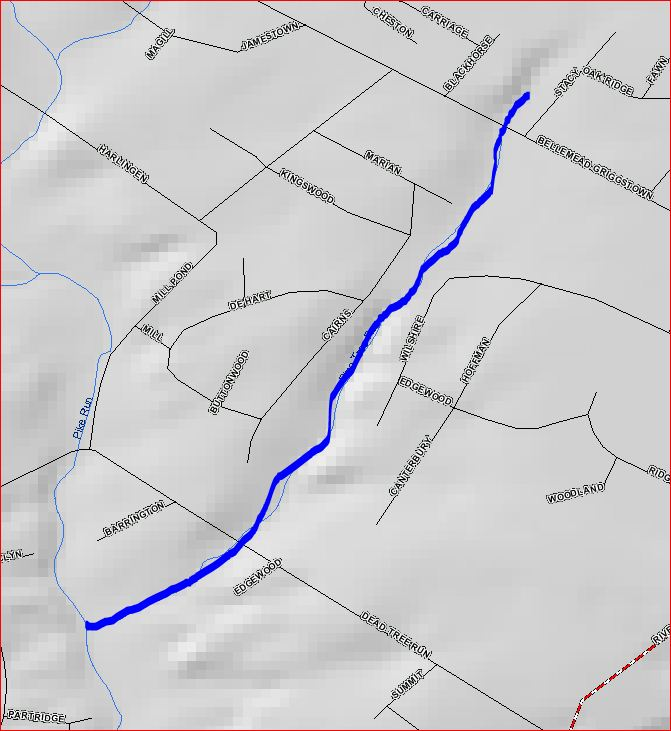
- Map of Pine Tree Run

Location
- Country: United States

Physical characteristics
- Source
  - coordinates: 40°26′48″N 74°37′50″W
- Mouth
  - coordinates: 40°25′45″N 74°38′41″W
  - elevation: 39 ft (12 m)

Basin features
- Progression: Pike Run, Beden Brook, Millstone River, Raritan River, Atlantic Ocean

Pine Tree Run is a tributary of Pike Run in Somerset County, New Jersey in the United States.

== Course ==
Pine Tree Run starts at 40°26′48″N 74°37′50″W, near Belle Mead-Griggstown Road. It flows southwest, crossing Dead Tree Run Road, before draining into Pike Run at 40°25′45″N 74°38′41″W.

== Sister tributaries ==
- Back Brook
- Cruser Brook

== See also ==
- List of rivers of New Jersey
