= Branch Back Brook =

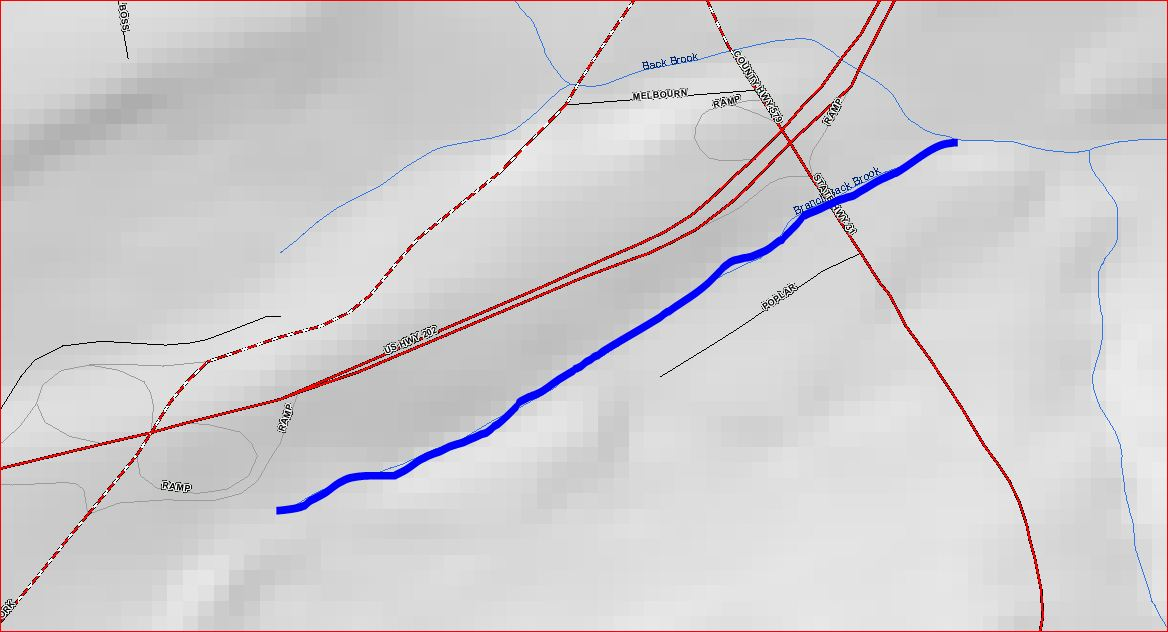
- Map of Branch Back Brook

Location
- Country: United States

Physical characteristics
- Source
  - coordinates: 40°25′0″N 74°52′30″W
- Mouth
  - coordinates: 40°25′24″N 74°51′45″W
  - elevation: 180 ft (55 m)

Basin features
- Progression: Back Brook, Pike Run, Beden Brook, Millstone River, Raritan River, Atlantic Ocean
- River system: Raritan River system

Branch Back Brook is a small tributary of Back Brook in Hunterdon County, New Jersey, in the United States.

== Course ==
Branch Back Brook starts at 40°25′0″N 74°52′30″W, near the intersection of Route 202 and Route 179 by Lake Enterprises. It flows northeast and crosses Route 31 before joining Back Brook at 40°25′24″N 74°51′45″W.

== See also ==
- List of rivers of New Jersey
