= Cruser Brook =

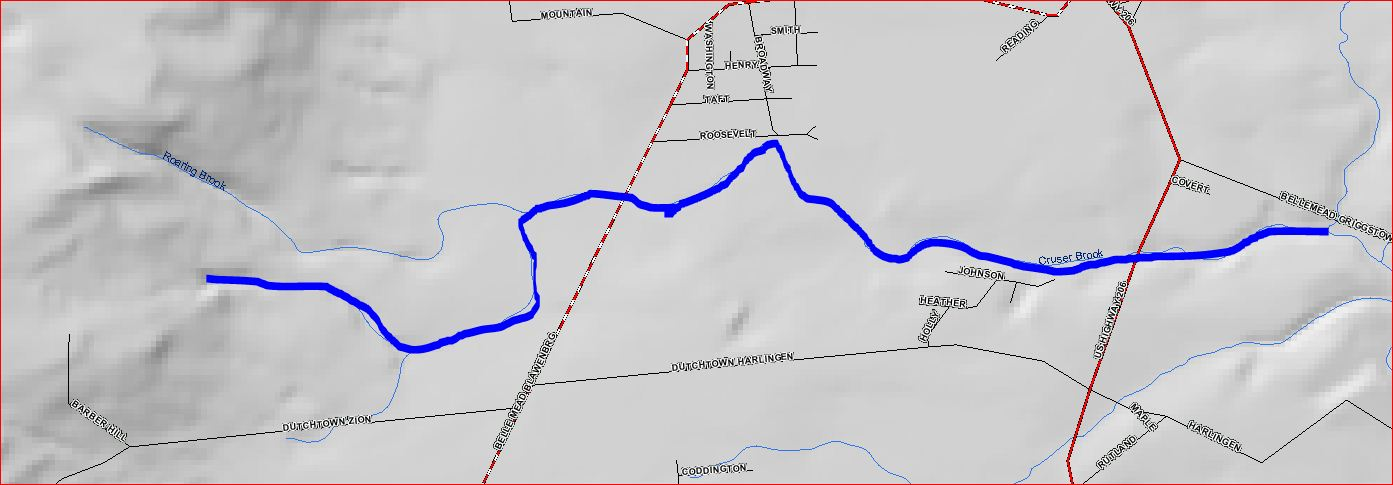
- Map of Cruser Brook

Location
- Country: United States

Physical characteristics
- Source
  - coordinates: 40°26′47″N 74°42′17″W
- Mouth
  - coordinates: 40°27′20″N 74°39′4″W
  - elevation: 52 ft (16 m)

Basin features
- Progression: Pike Run, Beden Brook, Millstone River, Raritan River, Atlantic Ocean
- Tributaries
  - left: Roaring Brook

Cruser Brook, also known as Crusers Brook, is a tributary of Pike Run in Somerset County, New Jersey in the United States.

== Course ==
Cruser Brook starts at 40°26′47″N 74°42′17″W in Sourland Mountain. It flows northeast and picks up Roaring Brook. It crosses CR-601 (Belle Mead-Blawenburg Road) and continues flowing east. It crosses Route 206 and drains into Pike Run at 40°27′20″N 74°39′4″W.

== Tributaries ==
- Roaring Brook

== Sister Tributaries ==
- Back Brook
- Pine Tree Run

== See also ==
- List of rivers of New Jersey
