= Dutchtown, Somerset County, New Jersey =

Populated place in Somerset County, New Jersey, US

Dutchtown, New Jersey
- Unincorporated community
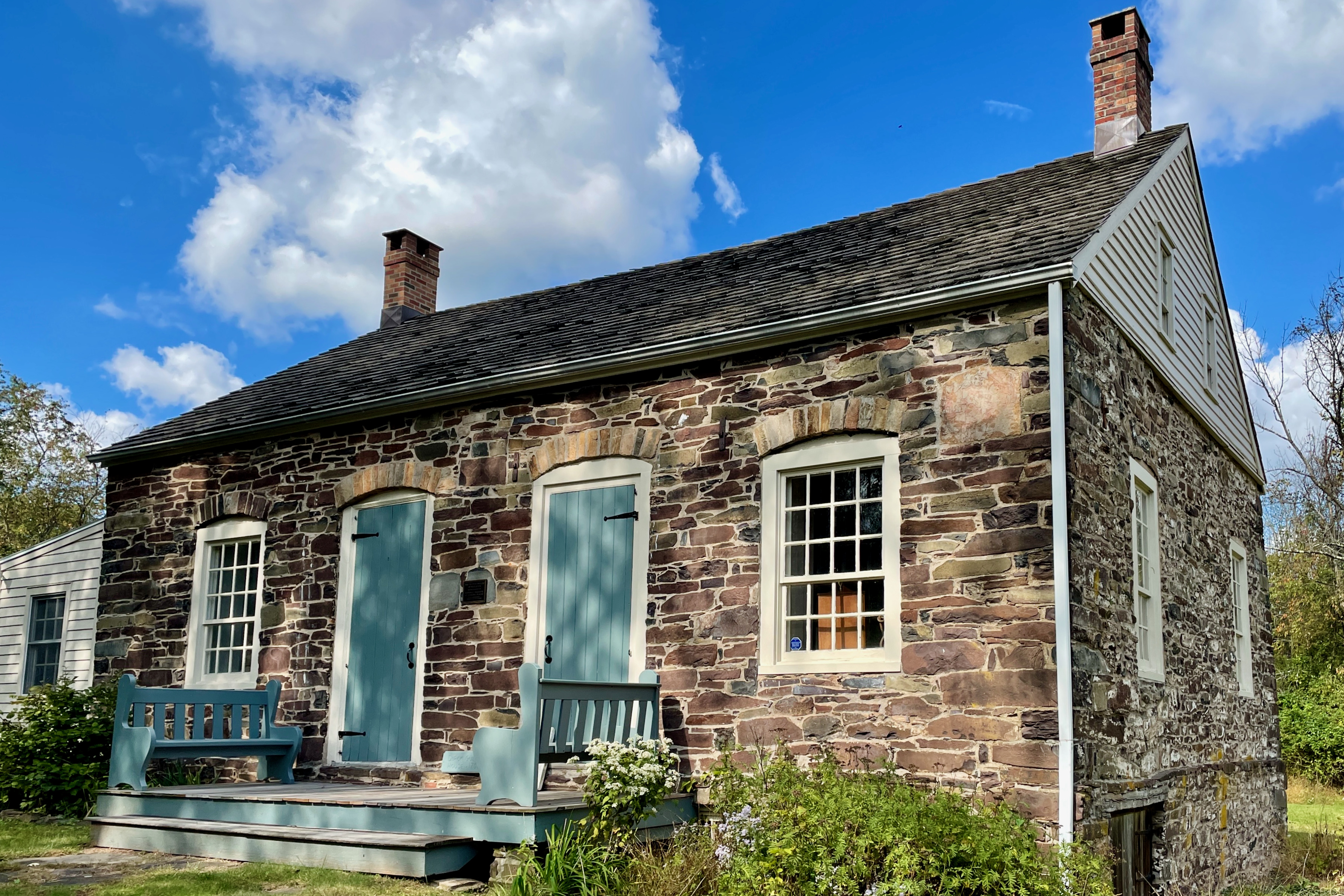
- Dirck Gulick House, listed on the NRHP

- Location within Somerset County, New Jersey Location within New Jersey Location within the United States
- Coordinates: 40°26′52″N 74°41′24″W
- Country: United States
- State: New Jersey
- County: Somerset
- Township: Montgomery
- Elevation: 112 ft (34 m)
- GNIS feature ID: 876021

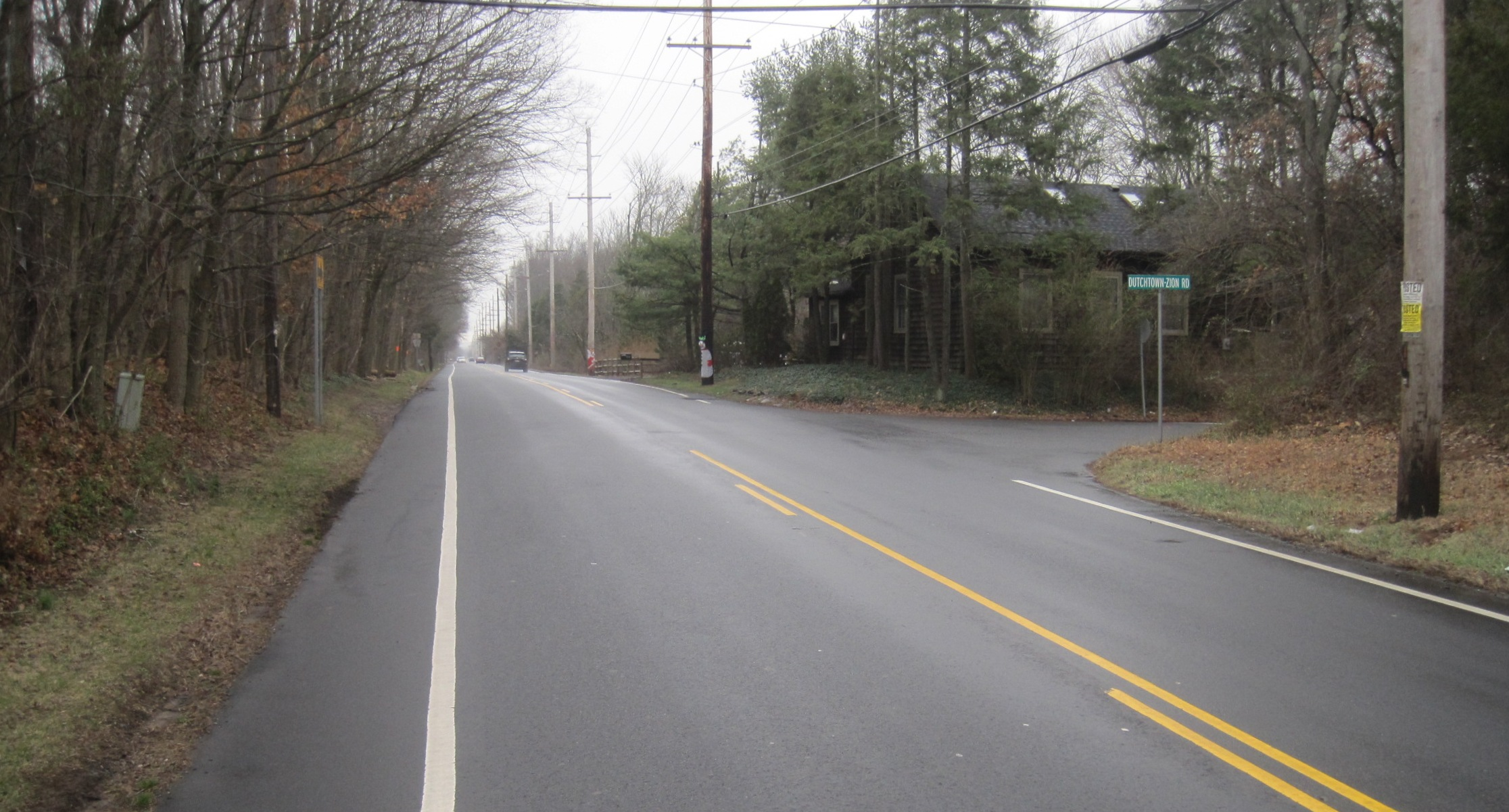
Looking south at the intersection of Belle Meade-Blawenberg Road (CR 601) and Dutchtown-Zion Road

Dutchtown is an unincorporated community located within Montgomery Township in Somerset County, in the U.S. state of New Jersey. The area consists mainly of forested land with some houses grouped around the intersection of Dutchtown-Zion Road and Belle Mead-Blawenberg Road (County Route 601) in the northern portion of the township. Also nearby are the Unionville Cemetery and a rock quarry. The Dirck Gulick House was added to the National Register of Historic Places in 2003.
