= Rock Brook =

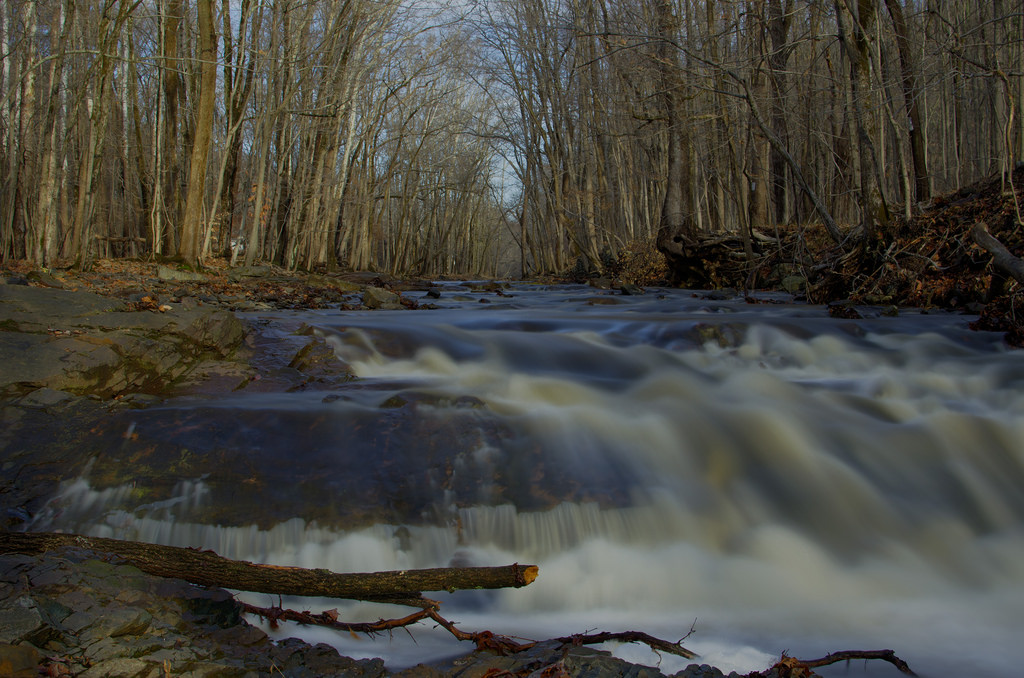
- Rock Brook, in Montgomery Township, Somerset County, New Jersey, U.S.

Location
- Country: United States

Physical characteristics
- Source
  - coordinates: 40°26′1″N 74°44′41″W
- Mouth
  - coordinates: 40°24′39″N 74°40′24″W
  - elevation: 52 ft (16 m)

Basin features
- Progression: Beden Brook, Millstone River, Raritan River, Atlantic Ocean
- Tributaries
  - left: Cat Tail Brook

Rock Brook is a tributary of Beden Brook in Somerset County, New Jersey in the United States.

== Course ==
Rock Brook starts at 40°26′1″N 74°44′41″W. It flows south through the town of Skillman, picking up several tributaries, until it enters a dammed section called Sylvan Lake. It then continues west before draining into Beden Brook at 40°24′39″N 74°40′24″W.

== Tributaries ==
- Cat Tail Brook

== Sister tributary ==
- Pike Run

== See also ==
- List of rivers of New Jersey
