= North Princeton Developmental Center =

Former medical facility in New Jersey, United States

Coordinates: 40.4197°N 74.6927°W

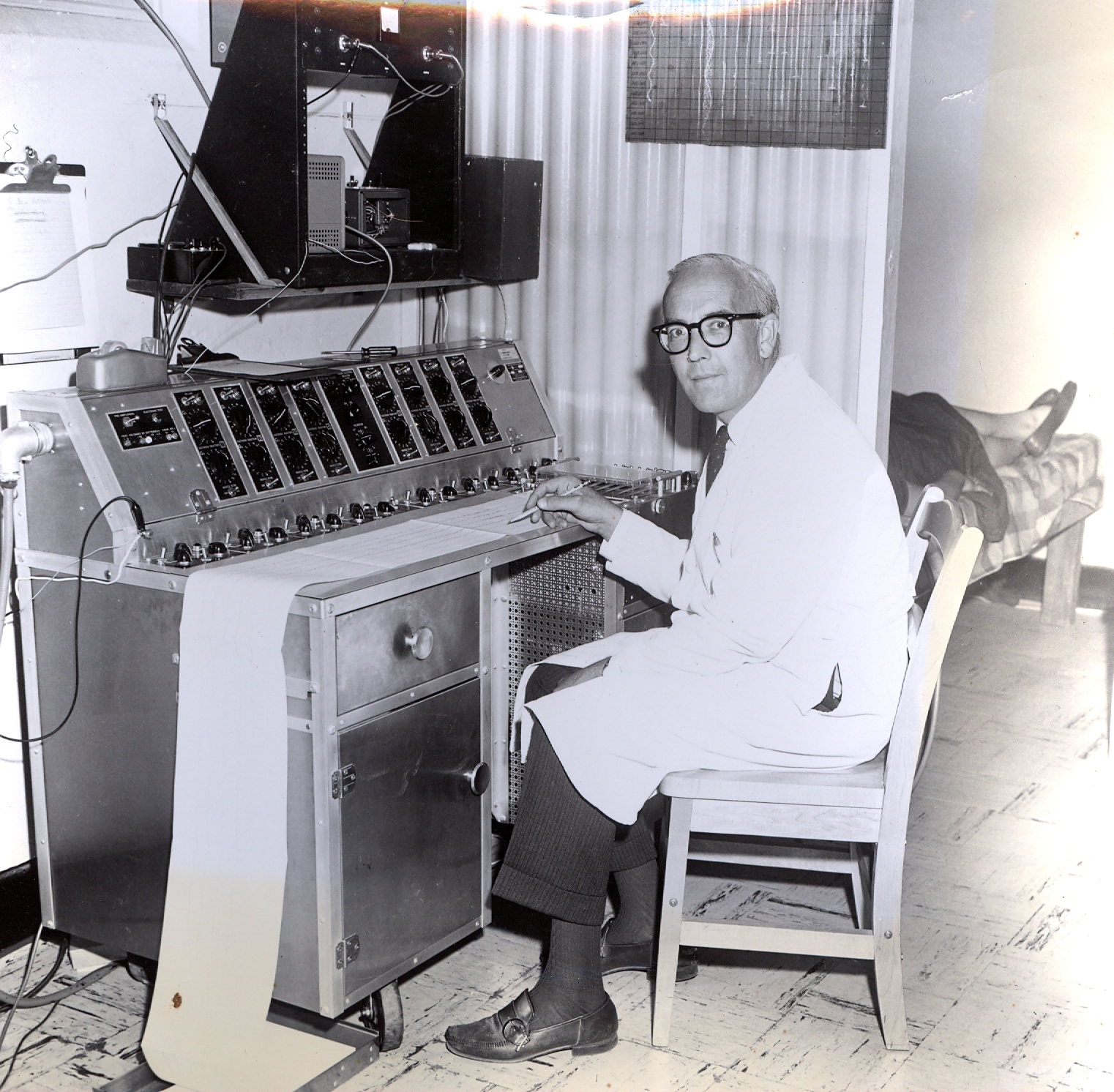
Professor Leonide Goldstein before his EEG recording Grass polygraph with the two Drohocki integrators above, located in Princeton's Neuropharmacology Dept., New Jersey Neuropsychiatric Institute (NJNPI) in 1965.

The North Princeton Developmental Center, formerly known as the New Jersey State Village for Epileptics, was a medical facility within Montgomery Township, Somerset County, New Jersey. The facility was home to a variety of mental health institutions throughout the years. In 2011, the former self-sustaining mental health village was slated for demolition to make space for a proposed county park. Demolition was completed in 2012 with plans to begin construction of the conceptual park in 2013. The facility garnered much notoriety over the past decades due to its "ghost town" appearance and mention in the popular book and periodical, "Weird N.J." Until its demolition, the former hospital was a popular place for "urban explorers" to explore, despite the buildings being unsafe (partially due to asbestos and lead paint contamination). Urban explorers were often met with resistance from law enforcement, as the site was prone to criminal activity, ranging from graffiti to arson. Prior to the demolition of the site, state and local governments have both made reasonable attempts to keep trespassers out, for example by sealing the entrances and windows of the property, though these methods proved to be relatively ineffective.

== History ==
The facility came into existence in 1898 after former Governor Foster M. Voorhees signed a bill into law that established the New Jersey State Village for Epileptics. Intended to subvert the admittance of epileptic patients into insane asylums and other unnecessarily harsh environments, the State Village for Epileptics offered this group a much more supportive and decent atmosphere in which they could thrive. The State Village was designed to be a completely autonomous community; within its boundaries were educational and medical facilities, a theater, a fully functional farm, a firehouse, a water treatment facility, an on-site landfill, housing, and even a power plant. The institution was considered to be an exemplary and progressive facility targeted at the treatment of epileptics.

In later years, namely throughout the Great Depression and World War II, the State Village suffered from financial cutbacks, which resulted in understaffing and overcrowding of the facilities. The dismal state of the institution during these times earned it the popular name, “The Snake Pit of New Jersey”.

With the advent of new prescription medications during the late 1940s, the State Village for Epileptics became obsolete by the early 1950s. With the aid of these new medications, many of the residents of the institution were able to function more efficiently within normal society, and were ultimately able to reintegrate themselves into the mainstream population. In 1953, the facility was turned into the New Jersey Neuro-Psychiatric Institute. This new institution focused on treatment and research of alcoholics, drug-addicts, people with cerebral palsy, and emotionally disturbed children.

The State of New Jersey closed down the facility in 1995, with the very last of the patients being removed in 1998. By this time, the facility had been designated as the North Princeton Developmental Center.

On January 23, 2007, Montgomery Township purchased the 256-acre (1.04 km^{2}) property on which the NPDC resides for a total of $5.95 million. The Township intends on demolishing or renovating the existing structures and replacing them with a large town center, which might include health care facilities, shops, housing for senior citizens, and parks. Since the purchase of the property, the Township has experienced much difficulty with the cleanup of the site. Many hazardous materials are still on-site which make the property uninhabitable. Most of these contaminants remain from the use of oil and coal heating systems, as well as the power plant, both of which were used by the facilities prior to condemnation. The Township has also encountered large amounts of asbestos in the buildings which has proven to make the restoration exponentially more difficult and costly. Much care is being taken with the progression of this project as the Village School, the local elementary school, is surrounded by the NPDC property. After coming across these problems and unwilling to pay the associated expenses, Montgomery Township decided to sue the State of New Jersey citing the Federal Resource Conservation and Recovery Act as well as the State Environmental Rights Act.

Montgomery sold 247 acres of the plot to Somerset County October 2011, and the county assumed the role of preserving the area for recreation and conservation. Demolition of the former "Skillman Village" was completed in 2012, with only one or two of the original buildings still standing. A passive recreation Somerset County Parks System facility known as Skillman Park occupies the majority of land, and includes a 2.2 mile paved multi-use loop trail built in 2014–5. The park is now open.
