= Montgomery Township, New Jersey =

Township in Somerset County, New Jersey, US

- Township
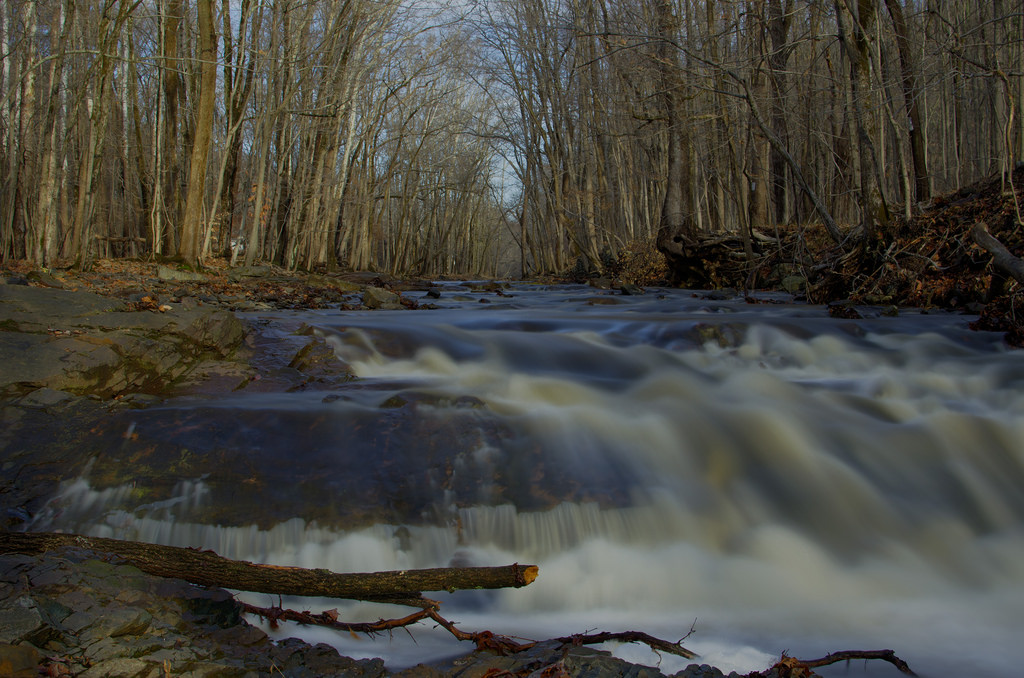
- Rock Brook

- logo

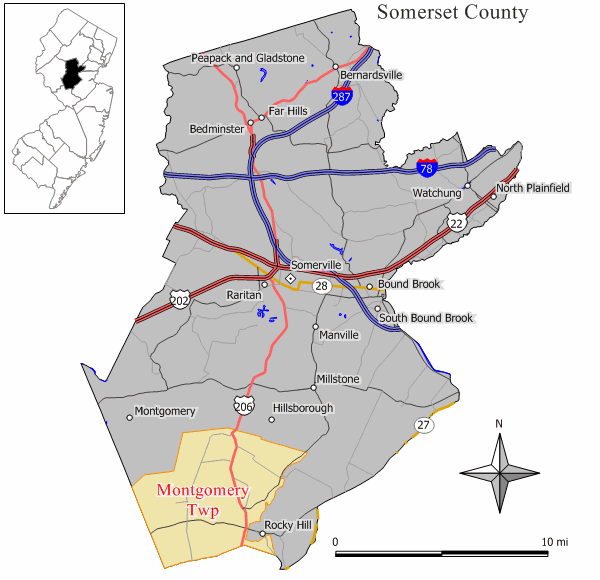
- Location of Montgomery Township in Somerset County highlighted in yellow (right). Inset map: Location of Somerset County in New Jersey highlighted in black (left).

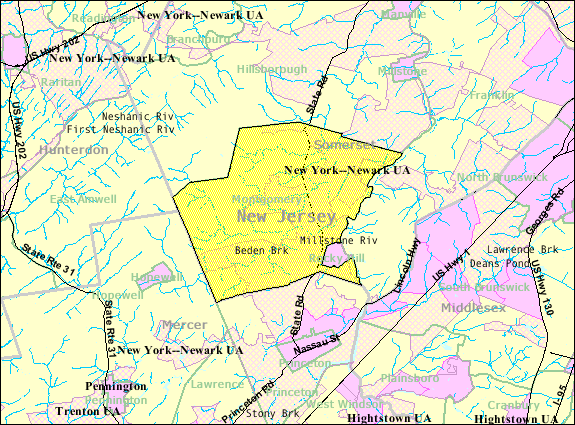
- Census Bureau map of Montgomery Township, New Jersey

- Location in Somerset County Location in New Jersey Location in the United States
- Coordinates: 40.426124°N 74.678446°W
- Country: United States
- State: New Jersey
- County: Somerset
- Incorporated: February 21, 1798
- Named for: Colonel Richard Montgomery

Government
  - Type: Township
  - Body: Township Committee
  - Mayor: Neena Singh (D, term ends December 31, 2025)
  - Administrator: Lori Savron
  - Municipal clerk: Lisa Fania

Area
  - Total: 32.48 sq mi (84.11 km^{2})
  - Land: 32.30 sq mi (83.66 km^{2})
  - Water: 0.17 sq mi (0.45 km^{2}) 0.54%
  - Rank: 75th of 565 in state 3rd of 21 in county
- Elevation: 98 ft (30 m)

Population (2020)
  - Total: 23,690
  - Estimate (2023): 23,719
  - Rank: 113th of 565 in state 5th of 21 in county
  - Density: 733.4/sq mi (283.2/km^{2})
  - Rank: 415th of 565 in state 16th of 21 in county
- Time zone: UTC−05:00 (Eastern (EST))
  - Summer (DST): UTC−04:00 (Eastern (EDT))
- ZIP Code: 08502 – Belle Mead; 08504 – Blawenburg; 08558 – Skillman; 08540 – Princeton
- Area codes: 609, 908
- FIPS code: 3403547580
- GNIS feature ID: 0882168
- Website: www.montgomerynj.gov

Montgomery Township is a township in southern Somerset County, in the central part of the U.S. state of New Jersey. It is located in the New York Metropolitan Area. As of the 2020 United States census, the township's population was 23,690, an increase of 1,436 (+6.5%) from the 2010 census count of 22,254, which in turn reflected an increase of 4,773 (+27.3%) from the 17,481 counted in the 2000 census.

Montgomery Township was incorporated on February 21, 1798, as one of New Jersey's initial group of 104 townships by an act of the New Jersey Legislature, from what remained of Western precinct. Portions of the township were taken to form Princeton Borough (February 11, 1813, in Mercer County, consolidated to form Princeton as of January 1, 2013), Princeton Township (April 9, 1838, also now consolidated into Princeton) and Rocky Hill (December 18, 1889).

The township has been one of the state's highest-income communities. Based on data from the American Community Survey for 2013–2017, Montgomery Township residents had a median household income of $180,660, ranked 2nd in the state among municipalities with more than 10,000 residents, more than double the statewide median of $76,475.

== History ==
Before European settlement began, the area now known as Montgomery Township was inhabited for approximately 20,000 years by Lenni Lenape tribal groups. The current Native American population of Montgomery Township is just under 0.1% of the total population.

The first European landowners in what was to become Montgomery Township, such as Johannas Van Home and Peter Sonmans, were speculators who did not live on the land, but sold large parts of what they owned to companies that subdivided it into farm-sized plots for those who did intend to settle. Many speculators and early settlers were of Dutch descent from the New Amsterdam area (especially Long Island), which, after the British ousted the Dutch (1664), was renamed New York in honor of the Duke of York (the future James II). The Township was originally known as the Western Precinct of Somerset County (i.e. west of the Millstone River). Before the creation of Mercer County in 1838, the southern border extended to Nassau Street in Princeton. In 1798 the Western Precinct was organized as Montgomery Township, named for General Richard Montgomery, who fell fighting for the patriot cause in the Battle of Quebec at the start of the Revolution (1775).

Most of the land is flat and fertile, running westward from the Millstone River to Province Line, which divides Somerset from Hunterdon County and once marked the division between East and West Jersey. Farms of 300 to 500 acres (1.2 to 2.0 km^{2}) were common, some owners keeping a few slaves to work the land and serve in the household. The aim of the early settlers was to produce as many of the necessities of life as they could: subsistence farming, in other words. Each farm had a vegetable garden, orchard, pasturage and fields for grain, as well as a stand of timber to be selectively cut for fuel. What became known as the Harlingen Tract (1710) included part of Sourland Mountain. Each farm on the flatland was assigned a separate strip of woodland that ran up to the Hunterdon border, all crossing Rock Brook. At points along the stream mills were built either to saw lumber or to grind grain. Other early mill sites were at Rocky Hill on the Millstone River, Bridgepoint on Pike Brook and on Bedens Brook near Blawenburg.

Settlement began in the first quarter of the eighteenth century. When churches, schools, general stores, blacksmith shops and hotel/taverns were built, they tended to cluster at intersections or other important points. For example, the intersection where the Carrier Clinic now stands used to be called Plainville or Posttown, having in the nineteenth century a post office, store, school house, blacksmith and wheelwright shops, as well as a hotel/tavern where the circuit judge presided. Most people walked to where they wanted to go. Schools were generally spaced no further than 4 miles (6.4 km) apart in order that no child would have to go more than 2 miles (3.2 km) to reach the nearest school. Churches marked the most important centers. The Dutch Church's earliest congregations first gathered in farm houses. The first church building at Harlingen dates to around 1750 and was called the Church at Sourland. The church at Neshanic in Hillsborough Township was established in 1752. In the early years these two churches shared a single pastor, and up to about 1800 they conducted their services in the Dutch language. One such pastor was Martinus Van Harlingen, who gave his name to the village, to the church that now bears his name, and to the local Historical Society. The Blawenburg church, an offshoot of the one at Harlingen, dates to 1830 and was erected in three days.

During the Revolution, the Township was the scene of marches by both British and patriot forces and of clashes between them. In the century that followed the movement of goods and people was accelerated by increasingly swifter forms of transportation. First was the building of the Georgetown and Franklin Turnpike between Lambertville and New Brunswick (1820–1822: Route 518). Next came the digging of the Delaware and Raritan Canal along the east side of the Millstone River (1834). Railroad construction followed with the Delaware and Bound Brook Railroad (later the Reading), which established depots at Skillman, Harlingen and Belle Mead (1875). In the early years of the twentieth century, the arrival of the automobile, of electricity and of the telephone brought further growth and change. In consequence, and over time, the one or two room schoolhouse was supplanted by the central school, post offices were consolidated and most of the hotels/taverns disappeared. The crossroad hamlets that once offered basic services of general store, blacksmith shops and the like disappeared also, many leaving only their names to mark a road or an area: Skillman, Bridgepoint and Dutchtown are examples.

The paving and realignment of roads, and the building of new ones, came toward the end of the transportation revolution. A new major north–south highway, Route 206, was created in 1927. Before that time Montgomery and Mount Lucas Roads were parts of the chief north–south route through the center of the Township. Farming continued despite many changes in the economy and in agricultural practices. In the late nineteenth century subsistence farming was giving way to specialized operations, such as dairying, poultry farming, and fruit orchards. As the twentieth century drew to a close even these ventures no longer offered the farmer an easy existence, given the rapidly appreciating value of the land, over against the low prices of products produced on it. As farms became less and less profitable, the land was converted to other uses. For example, in 1898 the facility for the treatment of epileptics was built on farmland between Blawenburg and Skillman. Since the Second World War, housing developments, shopping centers and business parks have sprung up, leaving as remnants of the long tradition of agriculture in Montgomery roadside stands, riding stables and the like.

As rapid growth throughout the Princeton area has spread suburban sprawl across the Township, the push to limit runaway development and to acquire open space has become an urgent concern of the community. In the last decade of the twentieth century, Montgomery's population nearly doubled, making it the fastest growing township in the county.

== Geography ==
According to the United States Census Bureau, the township had a total area of 32.47 square miles (84.11 km^{2}), including 32.30 square miles (83.66 km^{2}) of land and 0.17 square miles (0.45 km^{2}) of water (0.54%).

Belle Mead (with a 2020 Census population of 5,569), Blawenburg (287), Harlingen (430), and Skillman (237) are unincorporated communities and census-designated places (CDPs) located within Montgomery Township.

Other unincorporated communities, localities and place names located partially or completely within the township include Amwell, Bridgepoint, Dutchtown, Fairview, Plainville, Rocky Hill, Stoutsburg, and Zion.

The township borders Franklin Township, Hillsborough Township, and Rocky Hill in Somerset County, East Amwell Township in Hunterdon County; and both Hopewell Township and Princeton in Mercer County.

Township residents are served by three post offices located wholly within the township's borders: Belle Mead with ZIP code 08502, Skillman with ZIP code 08558 and Blawenburg with ZIP code 08504. A portion of the southern section of the township is serviced by the Princeton post office with ZIP code 08540.

=== Ecology ===
According to the A. W. Kuchler U.S. potential natural vegetation types, Montgomery would have an Appalachian Oak (104) vegetation type with an Eastern Hardwood Forest (25) vegetation form.

== Demographics ==
Historical population
| Census | Pop. | Note | %± |
|---|---|---|---|
| 1790 | 1,875 | | — |
| 1810 | 2,282 | | — |
| 1820 | 2,495 | | 9.3% |
| 1830 | 2,834 | | 13.6% |
| 1840 | 1,482 | * | −47.7% |
| 1850 | 1,767 | | 19.2% |
| 1860 | 1,975 | | 11.8% |
| 1870 | 2,066 | | 4.6% |
| 1880 | 1,928 | | −6.7% |
| 1890 | 1,655 | * | −14.2% |
| 1900 | 1,243 | | −24.9% |
| 1910 | 1,637 | | 31.7% |
| 1920 | 2,082 | | 27.2% |
| 1930 | 2,648 | | 27.2% |
| 1940 | 3,360 | | 26.9% |
| 1950 | 3,819 | | 13.7% |
| 1960 | 3,851 | | 0.8% |
| 1970 | 6,353 | | 65.0% |
| 1980 | 7,360 | | 15.9% |
| 1990 | 9,612 | | 30.6% |
| 2000 | 17,481 | | 81.9% |
| 2010 | 22,254 | | 27.3% |
| 2020 | 23,690 | | 6.5% |
| 2023 (est.) | 23,719 | | 0.1% |
Population sources: 1790–1920; 1840 1850–1870 1850; 1870 1880–1890; 1890–1910 1910–1930; 1940–2000 2000; 2010 2020 * = Lost territory in previous decade.

=== 2010 census ===
The 2010 United States census counted 22,254 people, 7,635 households, and 6,077 families in the township. The population density was 688.8 per square mile (265.9/km^{2}). There were 7,902 housing units at an average density of 244.6 per square mile (94.4/km^{2}). The racial makeup was 67.66% (15,057) White, 2.84% (633) Black or African American, 0.09% (19) Native American, 25.61% (5,700) Asian, 0.01% (2) Pacific Islander, 1.34% (298) from other races, and 2.45% (545) from two or more races. Hispanic or Latino of any race were 4.57% (1,017) of the population.

Of the 7,635 households, 48.5% had children under the age of 18; 70.9% were married couples living together; 6.7% had a female householder with no husband present and 20.4% were non-families. Of all households, 17.7% were made up of individuals and 7.2% had someone living alone who was 65 years of age or older. The average household size was 2.90 and the average family size was 3.31.

30.8% of the population were under the age of 18, 5.0% from 18 to 24, 22.3% from 25 to 44, 32.0% from 45 to 64, and 9.9% who were 65 years of age or older. The median age was 40.8 years. For every 100 females, the population had 94.2 males. For every 100 females ages 18 and older there were 89.1 males.

The Census Bureau's 2006–2010 American Community Survey showed that (in 2010 inflation-adjusted dollars) median household income was $146,100 (with a margin of error of +/− $16,235) and the median family income was $167,889 (+/− $10,202). Males had a median income of $110,549 (+/− $4,286) versus $80,268 (+/− $15,872) for females. The per capita income for the borough was $62,642 (+/− $4,981). About 1.4% of families and 2.3% of the population were below the poverty line, including 1.7% of those under age 18 and 5.9% of those age 65 or over.

=== 2000 census ===
As of the 2000 United States census there were 17,481 people, 5,803 households, and 4,781 families residing in the township. The population density was 535.9 inhabitants per square mile (206.9/km^{2}). There were 6,130 housing units at an average density of 187.9 per square mile (72.5/km^{2}). The racial makeup of the township was 84.55% White, 2.07% African-American, 0.09% Native American, and 11.52% Asian American. Hispanic or Latino of any race were 2.21% of the population.

There were 5,803 households, out of which 51.1% had children under the age of 18 living with them, 75.5% were married couples living together, 5.3% had a female householder with no husband present, and 17.6% were non-families. 14.2% of all households were made up of individuals, and 3.5% had someone living alone who was 65 years of age or older. The average household size was 2.99 and the average family size was 3.33.

In the township the population was spread out, with 32.9% under the age of 18, 3.9% from 18 to 24, 31.9% from 25 to 44, 24.4% from 45 to 64, and 6.8% who were 65 years of age or older. The median age was 37 years. For every 100 females, there were 97.4 males. For every 100 females aged 18 and over, there were 93.8 males.

The median income for a household in the township was $118,850, and the median income for a family was $129,150. 70.20% of the residents had a college education or better, and 89.8% are white collar. Males had a median income of $86,687 versus $55,441 for females. The per capita income for the township was $48,699. About 1.4% of families and 1.5% of the population were below the poverty line, including 1.2% of those under age 18 and 1.3% of those age 65 or over.

== Parks and recreation ==
=== Skillman Village ===
In 2007, the Township of Montgomery purchased a 256-acre (1.04 km^{2}) parcel of land once known as the North Princeton Developmental Center from the State of New Jersey, located in Montgomery adjoining Skillman Road and Burnt Hill Road. In addition, the Township acquired from the State the adjacent wastewater treatment facility on 7 acres (28,000 m^{2}), behind the State-owned Skillman Dairy Farm. The NPDC property, originally established in 1898 as the "New Jersey State Village for Epileptics," operated as a self-contained community that consisted of hospitals, housing, maintenance areas, schools, a power plant, a wastewater treatment facility and an on-site landfill. Later, it became the New Jersey Neuropsychiatric Institute. Most recently, and until 1998, the property was the New Jersey Department of Human Services' psychiatric care facility "North Princeton Developmental Center".

For years there were over 100 buildings on the Property, mostly in substandard, unsafe, unsanitary, dilapidated and/or obsolescent condition. Ninety-two of these buildings were abated and demolished summer 2007. The remaining handful of buildings have been boarded up in anticipation of possible reuse as part of redevelopment. Efforts are ongoing to remediate environmental conditions at the site and repair or demolish the dam and restore the lake. The property's environmental contamination must be remediated and brought into compliance with applicable laws and regulations.

The original plan for the land was development. The Township prepared a redevelopment plan and solicited redevelopment proposals for a "Town Square" concept which would have created hundreds of new residential and commercial units. However, no developers submitted bids.

Throughout the rest of 2008 and all of the next few years, the debate over Skillman Village changed. The local Republican team led by Kacey Dyer and Mark Caliguire proposed selling all of the land to Somerset County to create a passive-use park.

In October 2010, Somerset County agreed to purchase the land for a passive-use park for $14.1 million.

=== Skillman Park ===
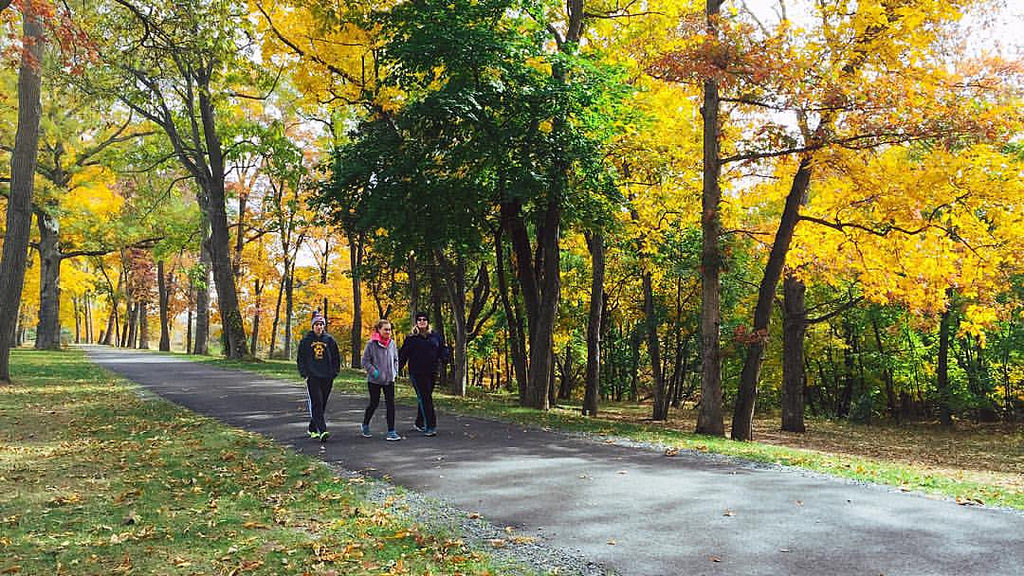
Residents walking in Skillman Park

Skillman Park covers 247 acres (100 ha) of open space in the Skillman section of Montgomery Township that is owned by Somerset County and maintained by the Somerset County Parks Department. In April 2015 a ribbon cutting ceremony was held by County officials to celebrate the park's opening.

== Government ==
=== Local government ===
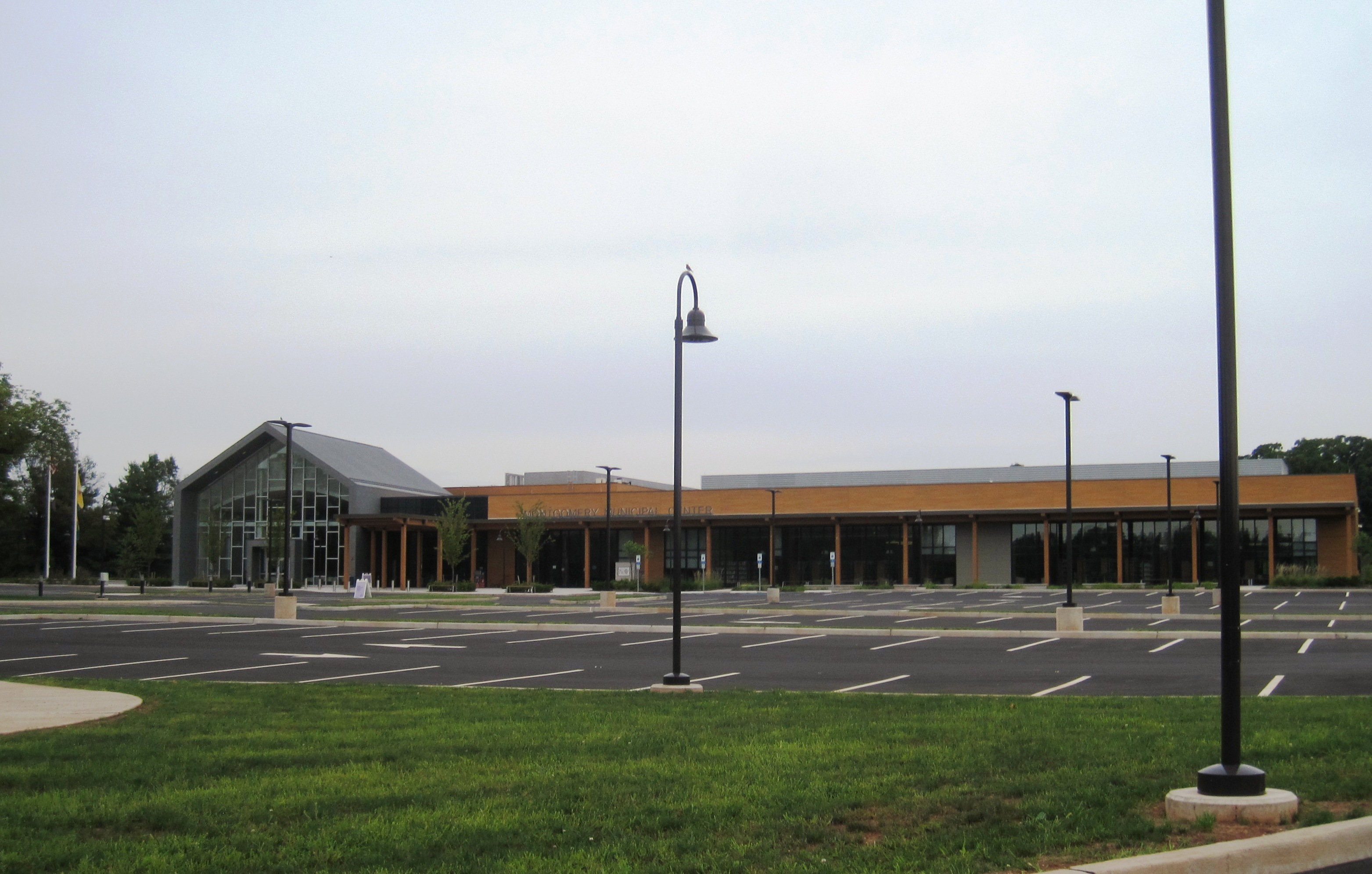
Montgomery Township Municipal Complex completed in 2022

Montgomery Township is governed under the Township form of New Jersey municipal government, one of 141 municipalities (of the 564) statewide that use this form, the second-most commonly used form of government in the state. The Township Committee is comprised of five members, who are elected directly by the voters at-large in partisan elections to serve three-year terms of office on a staggered basis, with either one or two seats coming up for election each year as part of the November general election in a three-year cycle. At an annual reorganization meeting, the Township Committee selects which of its members will serve as Mayor and Deputy Mayor for that year.

As of March 2025, the members of the Montgomery Township Committee are Mayor Neena Singh (D, term on committee ends 2027, term as mayor ends December 31, 2025), Deputy Mayor Vincent P. Barragan (D, term on committee ends 2028; term as deputy mayor ends December 31, 2025), Dennis Ahn (D, 2027), Mike Martin (D, 2028) and Patricia Taylor Todd (D, 2026).

In June 2022, the Township Committee appointed Vincent Barragan to fill the seat expiring in December 2022 that had been held by Kent Huang until he resigned from office the previous month. In February 2025, the Township Committee appointed Mike Martin to fill the seat expiring in December 2025 that had been held by Devra Keenan until she resigned from office the previous month.

When she took office in January 2019, Sadaf Jaffer became the first South Asian woman to hold a mayoral position in New Jersey.

==== Municipal court ====
The Montgomery Township Municipal Court is held in neighboring Hillsborough Township in the courtroom within the Hillsborough Township Municipal Complex, as part of a shared services agreement between the two townships. The court hears all motor vehicle, disorderly persons offenses, weights/measures complaints, fish and game violations, local ordinance violations and citizen complaints.

==== Emergency services ====
Montgomery Township is served by two primary all-volunteer fire companies, and an all volunteer rescue squad which provide the township with round the clock protection.

- Station 45 Fire – Montgomery Township Fire District #1 covering Belle Mead and northern half of township.
- Station 46 Fire – Montgomery Township Fire District #2 covering Blawenburg and the southern half of township.
- Squad 47 EMS – Montgomery EMS
- *Station 53 Fire – Rocky Hill Fire Department

*Montgomery Township District #2 and Rocky Hill Fire Department established an agreement for mutual aid first-due coverage into both of their respective response areas (portion of district #2) to provide better and more efficient fire protection to the residents of Rocky Hill and Montgomery. Select areas such as District #2's portion of Route 206 (its businesses, residences, and other buildings), County Route 518, and the Blue Spring Road developments and housing is also served by the Rocky Hill Fire Department (Station 53).

=== Federal, state, and county representation ===
Montgomery Township is located in the 12th Congressional District and is part of New Jersey's 16th state legislative district

For the 119th United States Congress, New Jersey's 12th congressional district is represented by Bonnie Watson Coleman (D, Ewing Township). New Jersey is represented in the United States Senate by Democrats Cory Booker (Newark, term ends 2027) and Andy Kim (Moorestown, term ends 2031).

For the 2026–2027 session, the 16th legislative district of the New Jersey Legislature is represented in the New Jersey Senate by Andrew Zwicker (D, South Brunswick) and in the General Assembly by Mitchelle Drulis (D, East Amwell Township) and Roy Freiman (D, Hillsborough Township).

Somerset County is governed by a five-member Board of County Commissioners, whose members are elected at-large to three-year terms of office on a staggered basis, with one or two seats coming up for election each year. At an annual reorganization meeting held in the first week of January, the board selects a Director and deputy director from among its members. As of 2025, Somerset County's County Commissioners are Director Shanel Robinson (D, Franklin Township, term as commissioner ends 2027; term as director ends 2026), Deputy Director Paul Drake (D, Hillsborough Township, term as commissioner and as deputy director ends 2026), Melonie Marano (D, Green Brook Township, 2028), Elizabeth Graner (D, Bernards Township, 2026; elected to serve an unexpired term) and Sara Sooy (D, Bedminster Township, 2027).

Constitutional officers, elected on a countywide basis are Clerk Steve Peter (D, Somerville, 2027), Sheriff Darrin Russo (D, Franklin Township, 2028) and Surrogate Bernice "Tina" Jalloh (D, Franklin Township, 2030).

=== Politics ===
As of March 2011, there were a total of 14,253 registered voters in Montgomery Township, of which 3,884 (27.3% vs. 26.0% countywide) were registered as Democrats, 3,297 (23.1% vs. 25.7%) were registered as Republicans and 7,068 (49.6% vs. 48.2%) were registered as Unaffiliated. There were 4 voters registered as Libertarians or Greens. Among the township's 2010 Census population, 64.0% (vs. 60.4% in Somerset County) were registered to vote, including 92.6% of those ages 18 and over (vs. 80.4% countywide).

United States presidential election results for Montgomery Township
| Year | Republican | | Democratic | | Third party(ies) | |
| Year | No. | % | No. | % | No. | % |
|---|---|---|---|---|---|---|
| 2024 | 4,132 | 32.84% | 8,007 | 63.64% | 442 | 3.51% |
| 2020 | 4,108 | 30.46% | 9,195 | 68.19% | 182 | 1.35% |
| 2016 | 3,806 | 34.30% | 6,849 | 61.72% | 442 | 3.98% |
| 2012 | 4,904 | 46.25% | 5,549 | 52.33% | 151 | 1.42% |
| 2008 | 4,731 | 43.26% | 6,082 | 55.61% | 123 | 1.12% |
| 2004 | 5,086 | 50.19% | 4,950 | 48.85% | 97 | 0.96% |
| 2000 | 3,847 | 53.82% | 3,145 | 44.00% | 156 | 2.18% |

In the 2012 presidential election, Democrat Barack Obama received 52.3% of the vote (5,549 cast), ahead of Republican Mitt Romney with 46.2% (4,904 votes), and other candidates with 1.4% (151 votes), among the 10,673 ballots cast by the township's 15,384 registered voters (69 ballots were spoiled), for a turnout of 69.4%. In the 2008 presidential election, Democrat Barack Obama received 6,082 votes (55.3% vs. 52.1% countywide), ahead of Republican John McCain with 4,731 votes (43.0% vs. 46.1%) and other candidates with 123 votes (1.1% vs. 1.1%), among the 11,002 ballots cast by the township's 13,849 registered voters, for a turnout of 79.4% (vs. 78.7% in Somerset County). In the 2004 presidential election, Republican George W. Bush received 5,086 votes (50.0% vs. 51.5% countywide), ahead of Democrat John Kerry with 4,950 votes (48.7% vs. 47.2%) and other candidates with 97 votes (1.0% vs. 0.9%), among the 10,171 ballots cast by the township's 11,980 registered voters, for a turnout of 84.9% (vs. 81.7% in the whole county).

Gubernatorial election results for Montgomery Township
| Year | Republican | | Democratic | | Third party(ies) | |
| Year | No. | % | No. | % | No. | % |
|---|---|---|---|---|---|---|
| 2025 | 3,409 | 33.50% | 6,695 | 65.79% | 73 | 0.72% |
| 2021 | 2,995 | 37.67% | 4,903 | 61.67% | 53 | 0.67% |
| 2017 | 2,715 | 42.45% | 3,552 | 55.53% | 129 | 2.02% |
| 2013 | 4,080 | 66.31% | 1,937 | 31.48% | 136 | 2.21% |
| 2009 | 3,999 | 53.97% | 2,818 | 38.03% | 592 | 7.99% |
| 2005 | 3,618 | 52.67% | 3,052 | 44.43% | 199 | 2.90% |

In the 2013 gubernatorial election, Republican Chris Christie received 66.3% of the vote (4,080 cast), ahead of Democrat Barbara Buono with 31.5% (1,937 votes), and other candidates with 2.2% (136 votes), among the 6,226 ballots cast by the township's 15,614 registered voters (73 ballots were spoiled), for a turnout of 39.9%. In the 2009 gubernatorial election, Republican Chris Christie received 3,999 votes (53.7% vs. 55.8% countywide), ahead of Democrat Jon Corzine with 2,818 votes (37.9% vs. 34.1%), Independent Chris Daggett with 531 votes (7.1% vs. 8.7%) and other candidates with 61 votes (0.8% vs. 0.7%), among the 7,444 ballots cast by the township's 13,992 registered voters, yielding a 53.2% turnout (vs. 52.5% in the county).

United States Senate election results for Montgomery Township1
| Year | Republican | | Democratic | | Third party(ies) | |
| Year | No. | % | No. | % | No. | % |
|---|---|---|---|---|---|---|
| 2024 | 4,136 | 33.59% | 7,800 | 63.35% | 376 | 3.05% |
| 2018 | 3,771 | 39.81% | 5,422 | 57.24% | 279 | 2.95% |
| 2012 | 4,786 | 46.90% | 5,217 | 51.12% | 202 | 1.98% |
| 2006 | 3,369 | 47.50% | 3,564 | 50.25% | 160 | 2.26% |

United States Senate election results for Montgomery Township2
| Year | Republican | | Democratic | | Third party(ies) | |
| Year | No. | % | No. | % | No. | % |
|---|---|---|---|---|---|---|
| 2020 | 4,639 | 34.78% | 8,560 | 64.17% | 140 | 1.05% |
| 2014 | 2,553 | 45.29% | 2,975 | 52.78% | 109 | 1.93% |
| 2013 | 1,897 | 45.17% | 2,270 | 54.05% | 33 | 0.79% |
| 2008 | 5,307 | 50.97% | 4,894 | 47.01% | 210 | 2.02% |

== Education ==
The Montgomery Township School District is a comprehensive public school district, comprised of five school facilities, that serves students in pre-kindergarten through twelfth grade from both Montgomery Township and Rocky Hill. As of the 2022–23 school year, the district, comprised of five schools, had an enrollment of 4,611 students and 403.6 classroom teachers (on an FTE basis), for a student–teacher ratio of 11.4:1. Schools in the district (with 2022–23 enrollment data from the National Center for Education Statistics) are Orchard Hill Elementary School with 813 students in grades PreK–2, Village Elementary School with 628 students in grades 3–4, Montgomery Lower Middle School with 738 students in grades 5–6, Montgomery Upper Middle School with 790 students in grades 7–8 and Montgomery High School with 1,603 students in grades 9–12.

With the addition of the Montgomery High School in 2005, students were transferred from the old high school, repurposed for use as the upper middle school, to the current one located on Route 601. In late 2008 the high school added a solar panel field to save on energy costs. The new Montgomery High School has an indoor pool as well as a brand new outdoor turf.

Montgomery Township was one of the fastest growing school districts in New Jersey. In September 1992, the K–12 enrollment was 1,590 compared to 4,924 in September 2005. This represents a tripling of enrollment in 13 years. However, since the 2005–2006 school year, enrollment has been flat due to a dramatic slowing of residential development in town.

Montgomery Township High School was the 33rd-ranked public high school in New Jersey out of 339 schools statewide in New Jersey Monthly magazine's September 2014 cover story on the state's "Education 2014: The State of Our Schools" after being ranked 61st in 2012 out of 328 schools listed and 10th in 2010 out of 322 schools listed.

Rocky Hill had been a non-operating school district whose school children attended the Montgomery Township schools as part of a sending/receiving relationship. It has since been consolidated into the Montgomery district.

== Infrastructure ==
=== Transportation ===
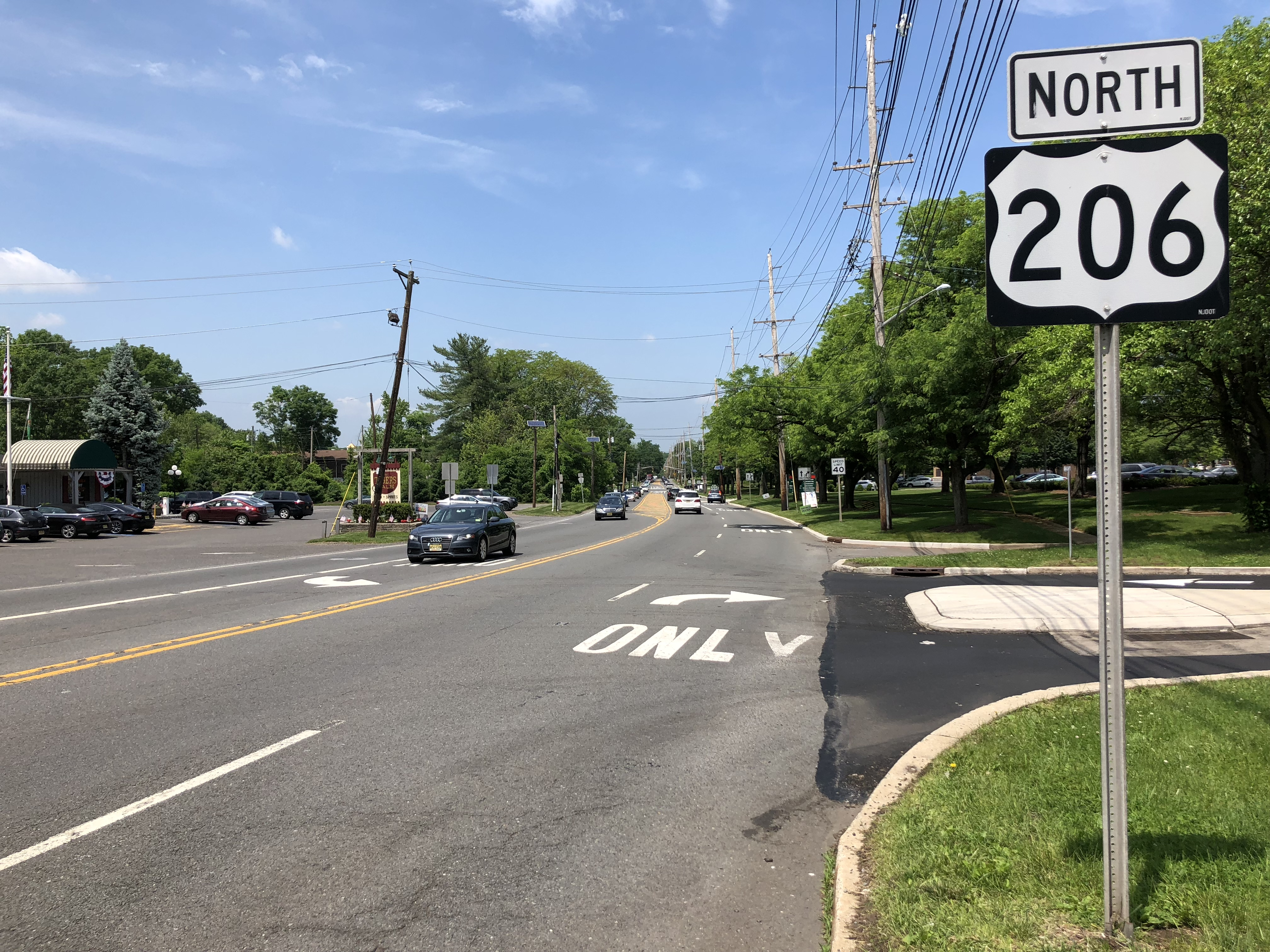
U.S. Route 206 and County Route 533 in Montgomery Township

==== Roads and highways ====
As of May 2010, the township had a total of 168.21 miles (270.71 km) of roadways, of which 138.40 miles (222.73 km) were maintained by the municipality, 23.98 miles (38.59 km) by Somerset County and 5.83 miles (9.38 km) by the New Jersey Department of Transportation.

U.S. Route 206 (with CR 533 overlapping it for a brief stretch) is the main road that goes through Montgomery. The other main county road that goes through is CR 518.

Limited access roads are accessible outside the municipality, such as Interstate 287 in bordering Franklin Township and Interstate 295 in bordering Hopewell Township.

==== Public transportation ====
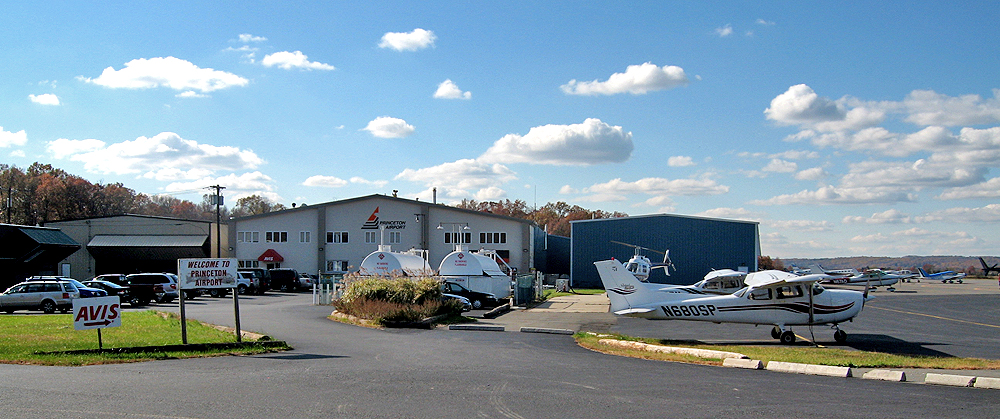
Princeton Airport

NJ Transit provides local bus service on the 605 route.

Princeton Airport is located in the township.

=== Healthcare ===
Penn Medicine Princeton Medical Center is a 355-bed regional non-profit, tertiary and academic medical center located in nearby Plainsboro Township. The hospital services the greater Princeton region in central New Jersey. It is owned by the Penn Medicine Health System and is the only such hospital in the state of New Jersey.

Other nearby regional hospitals and healthcare networks that are accessible to the township include the Somerville division and the New Brunswick division of Robert Wood Johnson University Hospital (RWJUH), along with Saint Peter's University Hospital, also in New Brunswick.

== Notable people ==
People who were born in, residents of, or otherwise closely associated with Montgomery Township include:

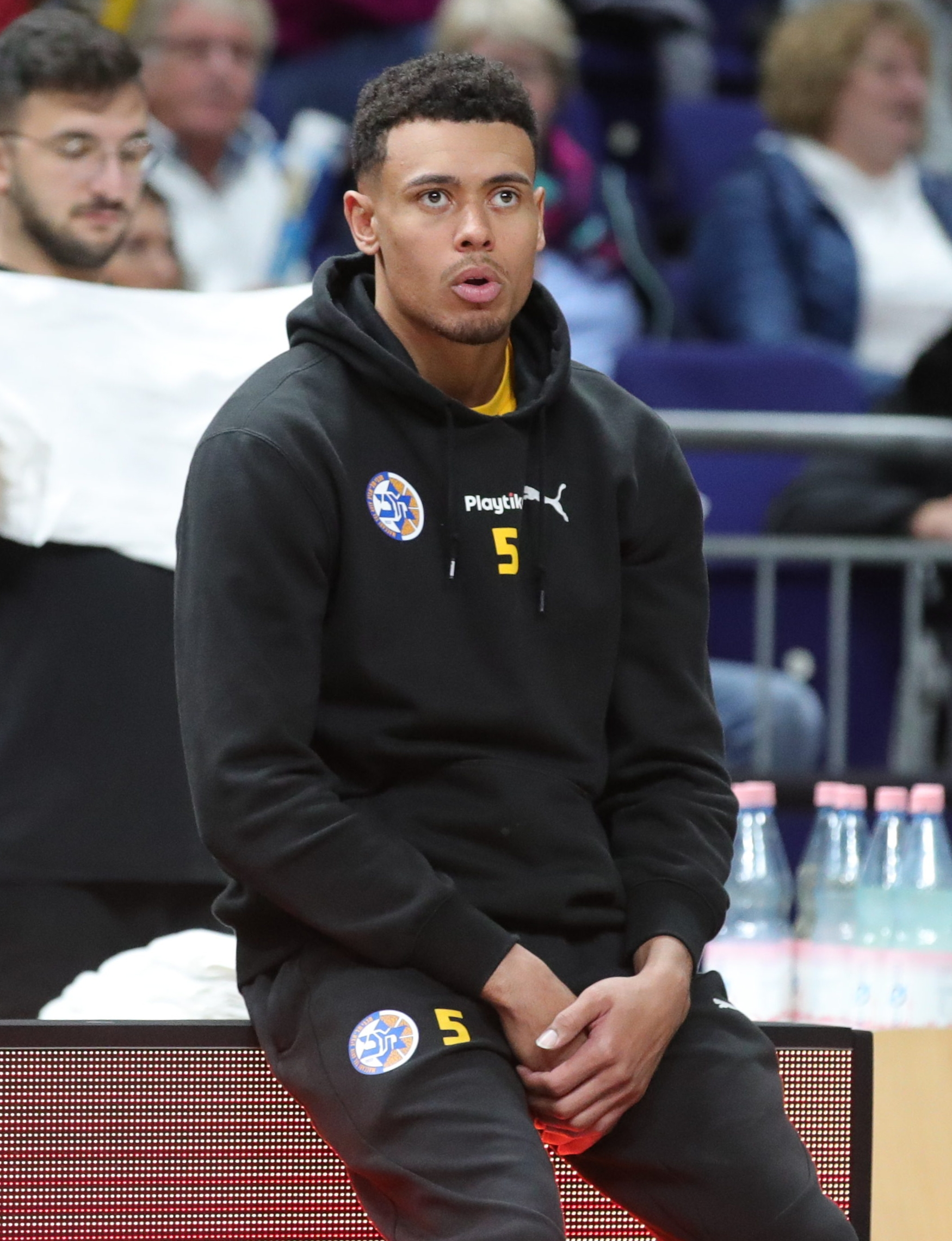
Wade Baldwin IV

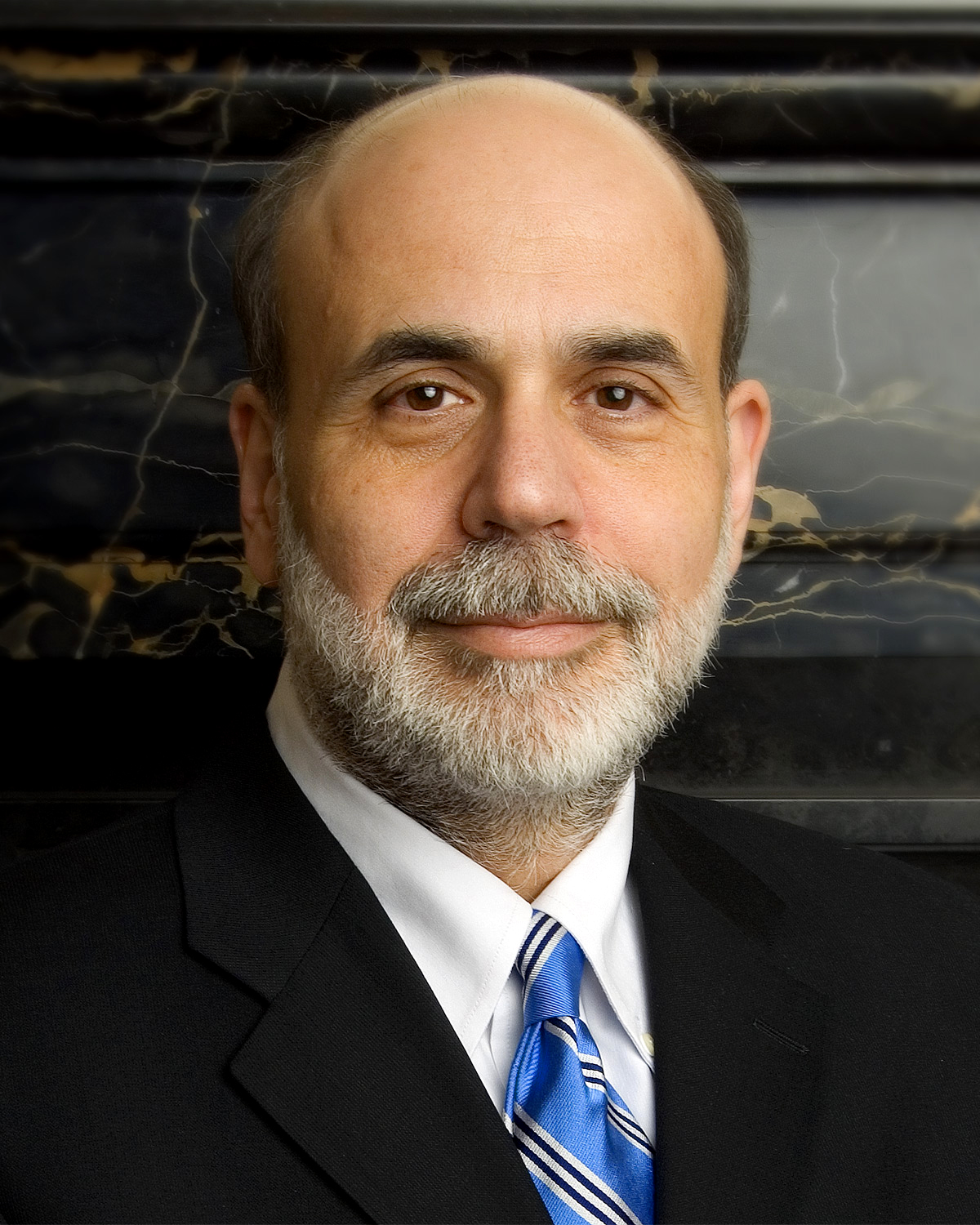
Ben Bernanke

- Wade Baldwin IV (born 1996), basketball player for the Memphis Grizzlies of the National Basketball Association
- Ben Bernanke (born 1953), former Chairman of the Federal Reserve, former resident and member of the Montgomery Township Board of Education
- Ira Black (1941–2006), neuroscientist and stem cell researcher who served as the first director of the Stem Cell Institute of New Jersey
- Yvonne Brill (1924–2013), rocket scientist
- Mike Ford (born 1992), first baseman who played for the New York Yankees
- Louis Gambaccini (1931–2018), government official who spent his career in the area of transportation.
- Brandon Grosso (born 2000), race car driver in the ARCA Menards Series
- Sadaf Jaffer (born 1983), politician who was Mayor of Montgomery Township and represented the 16th Legislative District in the New Jersey General Assembly
- John P. Lewis (1921–2010), academic and presidential advisor who was a strong advocate of aid to help build developing countries as a matter of foreign policy
- John Milhiser (born 1981), actor and comedian who has been a cast member on Saturday Night Live for the 2013–2014 season
- John Sheridan (1942–2014), former New Jersey Transportation Commissioner, lived in Skillman
- Upton Sinclair (1878–1968), wrote the muckraking fictional hit piece, The Jungle in 1906, while living on Province Line Road
- Mimi LaFollette Summerskill (1917–2008), educator, author, political activist and vineyard owner
- Tom Verducci (born 1960), sportswriter for Sports Illustrated
- Arlene White Lawrence (1916–1990), bishop and the third president and general superintendent of the Pillar of Fire Church
- Tom Wilson (born 1967), Republican Party leader who served as the chairman of the New Jersey Republican State Committee from 2004 to 2009
