= Middlesex Greenway =

The Middlesex Greenway may refer to:

- The Middlesex Greenway (Middlesex), United Kingdom
- The Middlesex Greenway (New Jersey), United States
