= Buccleuch Mansion =

Historic house in New Jersey, United States

- U.S. National Register of Historic Places
- New Jersey Register of Historic Places
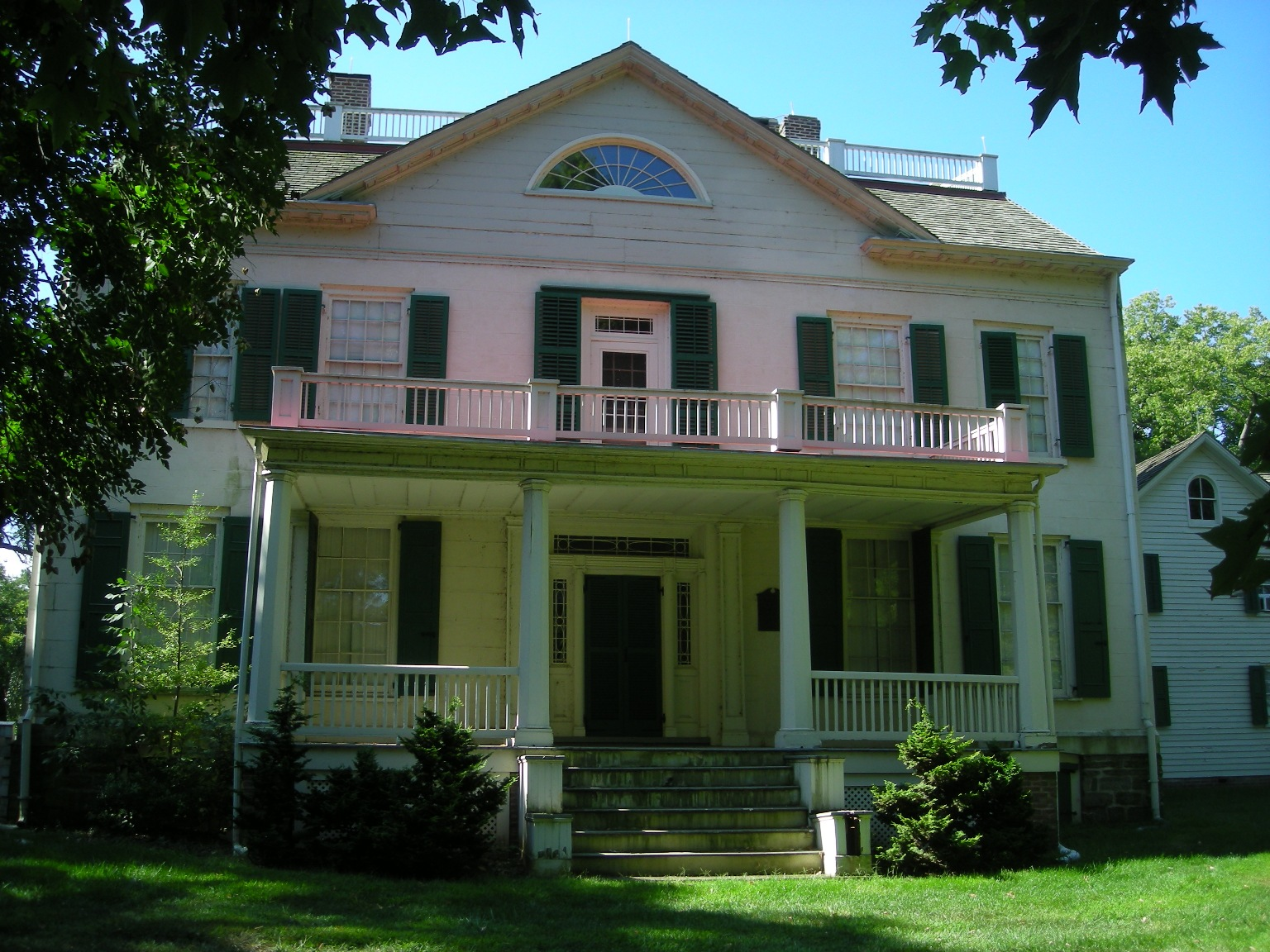

- Location within Middlesex County, New Jersey Location within New Jersey Location within the United States
- Location: 200 College Avenue, Buccleuch Park, New Brunswick, New Jersey
- Coordinates: 40°30′18″N 74°27′37″W
- Area: 78 acres (32 ha)
- Built: 1734
- Architectural style: Colonial
- NRHP reference No.: 77000883
- NJRHP No.: 1856

Significant dates
- Added to NRHP: April 13, 1977
- Designated NJRHP: June 21, 1976

Buccleuch Mansion is located in Buccleuch Park in the city of New Brunswick in Middlesex County, New Jersey, along the Raritan River. It was added to the National Register of Historic Places on April 13, 1977, for its significance in art, architecture, and military history.

== History ==
The house was originally built in 1739 by Anthony White, son-in-law of Lewis Morris, a colonial governor of New Jersey. White built the house for his bride Elizabeth Morris. Their son Anthony Walton White sided with the revolutionaries against the King in the American Revolutionary War. The house was previously known as "The White House Farm." The house was bought by Colonel Joseph Warren Scott in 1821. In 1911, Anthony Dey, the last private owner, donated 79 acres of surrounding land to the City of New Brunswick to be used for the park and the contents and furnishings to the Jersey Blue Chapter of the Daughters of the American Revolution. It was originally a 12-room Georgian-style house with a separate kitchen house; it was renovated in the Federal, Italianate and Greek Revival styles over time and now contains 16 rooms, with hand-painted Dufour wallpaper in the hallway showing monuments of Paris.

Today, the house is looked after by the Jersey Blue chapter of the Daughters of the American Revolution (DAR). Tours are given on Sundays from June through October, and at other times by appointment. The house is decorated with Federal and Victorian furnishings, many of which belonged to the Scott family, owners during much of the 19th century.

Buccleuch is not to be confused with the Buckelew Mansion in Jamesburg, another historic white-painted house in Middlesex County.

== Timeline ==
- 1739 Built by Anthony White
- 1780 Owned by Charles Stewart, Colonel in the 1780s and was visited by several prominent men, such as George Washington, Alexander Hamilton, General Kosciusko, General Gates, and John Hancock.
- 1821 Joseph Warren Scott (1778–1871) buys "The White House" from Mary Garnett and renames it "Buccleuch" on June 6
- 1871 Death of Joseph Warren Scott (1778–1871)
- 1911 Anthony Dey, grandson of Joseph Warren Scott (1778–1871), donated his home and 88 acres of woodland and fertile farmland to the City of New Brunswick, NJ

== See also ==
- National Register of Historic Places listings in Middlesex County, New Jersey
- List of the oldest buildings in New Jersey
