= Jamesburg High School =

Defunct high school in Middlesex County, New Jersey, US

Coordinates: 40.34757°N 74.44058°W

Jamesburg High School was a public high school that operated in Jamesburg, Middlesex County, in the U.S. state of New Jersey, as the lone secondary school of the Jamesburg Public Schools until its closure at the end of the 1978–79 school year.

Prior to opening its own high school, students from Jamesburg would attend either Freehold High School or New Brunswick High School.

The borough's first high school opened in 1906, with seven students in the district's elementary school sharing a common teacher with the eighth grade. In its early years, the school served students from the surrounding Middlesex and Monmouth county communities of Cranbury, East Brunswick, Englishtown, Helmetta, Manalapan Township, Monroe Township, Old Bridge Township and Spotswood. The high school relocated in 1912.

After multiple votes to create a new high school facility had failed, construction of a building to meet the expanding demand began in 1931 and the school opened in September 1932. Constructed at a cost of $165,000, the facility included 17 classrooms, an auditorium and a gymnasium.

Students from South Brunswick had attended the district until 1960, when South Brunswick High School was opened as the Jamesburg district would no longer accept students from the township after the 1959–60 school year.

The New Jersey Board of Education voted in May 1979 to shut down the high school, which with an enrollment of 182 students was the smallest in the state. Starting with the 1979–80 school year, Jamesburg began sending students to Monroe Township High School as part of a sending/receiving relationship with the Monroe Township School District. Students from Helmetta had been attending Jamesburg High School under a sending/receiving agreement, and switched its students to Spotswood High School. By the time the school closed, there were 4,100 graduates.

The first building to house the high school was eventually demolished and replaced by the current Grace M. Breckwedel Middle School building. The second building that housed the high school was turned into an office complex, which is still there today and known as Forsgate Commons. It is located on the intersection of Forsgate Drive and Davison Ave, right behind the district's John F. Kennedy Elementary School.

== Athletics ==
The baseball team won the Central Jersey Group I state sectional title in 1960 and 1961.

The boys' soccer team won the Group I championship playoffs in 1961 (defeating Blairstown High School in the tournament final), 1962 (vs. Blairstown), 1963 (declared as state champion), 1966 (as co-champion with Harrison High School), 1971 (vs. Harrison), 1972 (as co-champion with Harrison) and 1973 (vs. Chatham Borough High School). A 2–1 overtime win against Blairstown in the Group I final gave the team a 14–2 record for the season. The team ran their record to 11–1 after winning the 1962 Group I state title with a 2–1 overtime win against Blairstown in the championship game played at Pingry School. The 1966 team finished the season at 12–0–4 after coming back to tie Harrison 1–1 in the Group I championship game. The 1972 team finished the season with a 15–0–1 record after being declared as the Group I title co-champion with Harrison following a 1–1 tie after double overtime in the tournament final played at Fairleigh Dickinson University.

== Notable alumni ==
- Reed Gusciora (born 1960, class of 1978), politician who previously served in the General Assembly from 1996 to 2018 representing the 15th Legislative District and is currently the mayor of Trenton.
- Thomas S. Timberman (1900–1989, class of 1918), United States Army major general
