= Middlesex County Park System =

- Type: Public
- Location: Middlesex County, New Jersey
- Status: Open all year
- Website: Official website

The Middlesex County Park System is an agency that maintains over 32 parks and recreational areas, in Middlesex County, New Jersey, United States. The largest park is Thompson Park in Monroe Township and Jamesburg with 675 acres.

== List of parks ==
Park	Municipality	Visitation	Acreage
Donaldson Park	Highland Park	N/A	81*
Thomas A. Edison Park	Edison		180
Fords Park	Woodbridge	N/A	32
Johnson Park	Highland Park and Piscataway		478
Joseph Medwick Park	Carteret	N/A	86
Merrill Park	Woodbridge	N/A	182
Raritan Bay Waterfront Park	Sayreville and South Amboy		114
Roosevelt Park	Edison		217
Spring Lake Park	South Plainfield	N/A	127
Thompson Park	Monroe and Jamesburg		675
William Warren Park	Woodbridge and Perth Amboy		126
Old Bridge Waterfront Park	Old Bridge	N/A	71
Alvin P. Williams Park	Woodbridge	N/A	36
Davidson Mill Pond Park	South Brunswick		499
Delaware & Raritan State Park Trail	N: New Brunswick S: Trenton		n/a (70 miles)
John A. Phillips Park	Old Bridge		111
New Brunswick Landing	New Brunswick		n/a (11 nautical miles)
David B. Crabiel Park	Milltown and North Brunswick	N/A	24
Middlesex Greenway	Edison, Metuchen, and Woodbridge	N/A	42 (3.5 miles)
TOTAL			3,081

=== Nature preserves ===
Nature preserve	Municipality	Visitation	Acreage
Ambrose & Doty's Brooks Natural Area	Piscataway		218
Heathcote Meadows Preserve	South Brunswick		88
Ireland Brook Conservation Area	East Brunswick and South Brunswick		520
Jamesburg Park Conservation Area	East Brunswick, Helmetta, Spotswood, and Monroe		1,436
John A. Phillips Open Space Preserve	Old Bridge		1,694
Tamarack Hollow Preserve	East Brunswick		165
Thompson Park Conservation Area	Monroe		983
Scotts Corner Conservation Area	South Brunswick		159
Plainsboro Preserve	Plainsboro		1,057
Tamarack Hollow Preserve	East Brunswick		165
Pin Oak Forest	Woodbridge		97
Deep Run Preserve	Old Bridge		850
Matchaponix Forest	Monroe		100
Story Farm	Monroe		100
Van Dyke Farm	South Brunswick		196
Dismal Swamp Holdings	Edison and South Plainfield		120
TOTAL			7,948
