= Monroe Township School District =

School district in Middlesex County, New Jersey, US

Address
- 423 Buckelew Avenue Monroe Township, Middlesex County, New Jersey, 08831; United States
- Coordinates: 40.328744°N 74.409365°W

District information
- Grades: K-12
- Superintendent: Chari Robynne Chanley (on administrative leave); Adam Layman (Acting Superintendent)
- Business administrator: Laura Allen
- Schools: 8

Students and staff
- Enrollment: 6,906 (as of 2023–24)
- Faculty: 546.3 FTEs
- Student–teacher ratio: 12.6:1

Other information
- District Factor Group: FG
- Website: www.monroe.k12.nj.us
Ind.	Per pupil	District spending	Rank (*)	K-12 average	%± vs. average
1A	Total Spending	$18,612	53	$18,891	−1.5%
1	Budgetary Cost	14,063	43	14,783	−4.9%
2	Classroom Instruction	8,362	36	8,763	−4.6%
6	Support Services	2,021	35	2,392	−15.5%
8	Administrative Cost	1,458	54	1,485	−1.8%
10	Operations & Maintenance	1,753	62	1,783	−1.7%
13	Extracurricular Activities	330	84	268	23.1%
16	Median Teacher Salary	56,298	11	64,043
Data from NJDoE 2014 Taxpayers' Guide to Education Spending. *Of K-12 districts with more than 3,500 students. Lowest spending=1; Highest=103

The Monroe Township School District is a comprehensive community public school district that serves students in kindergarten through twelfth grade from Monroe Township, in Middlesex County, in the U.S. state of New Jersey.

As of the 2023–24 school year, the district, comprised of eight schools, had an enrollment of 6,906 students and 546.3 classroom teachers (on an FTE basis), for a student–teacher ratio of 12.6:1.

Students from Jamesburg attend Monroe Township High School as part of a sending/receiving relationship with the Jamesburg Public Schools established in 1980.

== History ==
The original building for Monroe Township High School, designed to serve 1,100 students, was constructed at a cost of $4.7 million (equivalent to $30.7 million in 2025). Groundbreaking for the new facility was held in July 1971 after a bond issue to cover the costs of the building was approved by voters in May 1971. Students started using the building in January 1974.

The New Jersey Board of Education voted in May 1979 to shutdown Jamesburg High School, which with an enrollment of 182 students was the smallest in the state. Starting with the 1979-80 school year, Jamesburg began sending students to Monroe Township High School.

The Marasco Center for the Performing Arts, named for a former superintendent, was constructed at a cost of $2.5 million and added to the high school in the mid-1990s, which added an auditorium of 1,000 seats. More classrooms were added in the early 2000s.

In 1996, the New Jersey Department of Education revised the elementary school core curriculum to require foreign language classes. In mid-October 1999 the district sent a questionnaire to 13,000 houses regarding what language should be taught to elementary students. The district received 458 back. 271 of those questionnaires chose Spanish, 96 of the returned questionnaires indicated a preference for Mandarin Chinese and the remaining 91 requested other languages that included Latin, Russian, and English itself. Stephen E. Derkoski, the assistant superintendent, stated that "We can't ignore" that residents had a preference of Spanish over Chinese on a 3 to 1 basis. In November 1999, the school board voted 7–1 to designate Spanish as the foreign language used in elementary schools.

Growth in the population of Monroe Township led to a proposal for relocation of the high school onto what was then part of the soccer fields of Thompson Park, a county-operated park located across the road from the previous high school building. Opponents of the site of the proposed high school claim that historical records show that the proposed location was the 18th century site of Bethel Indian Town. An archaeological study found mostly European artifacts in portions of the 35 acres (140,000 m^{2}) of the proposed site, with only about eight or so Native American artifacts among them. The new Monroe Township High School building was completed in time for the 2011-12 school year, despite discovery of an old farmstead on the site. With the completion of the $125 million project to create a new 365,000-square-foot (33,900 m^{2}) building for the new high school, the previous high school building (across the street from the current one) was turned into the township's middle school, and what was called "Applegarth Middle School" was converted into an elementary school building.

The district had been classified by the New Jersey Department of Education as being in District Factor Group "FG", the fourth highest of eight groupings. District Factor Groups organize districts statewide to allow comparison by common socioeconomic characteristics of the local districts. From lowest socioeconomic status to highest, the categories are A, B, CD, DE, FG, GH, I and J.

== Awards and recognition ==
During the 1991–92 academic school year, Mill Lake Elementary School received the National Blue Ribbon Award of Excellence from the United States Department of Education, the highest honor that an American school can achieve. This honor was followed during the 1998–99 academic school year at Barclay Brook Elementary School. Both of the district's Pre-K through third grade schools have received the honor.

== Schools ==
Schools in the district (with 2023–24 enrollment data from the National Center for Education Statistics) are:

Elementary schools

- Applegarth Elementary School with 442 students in grades 4–5
  - Dawn Graziano, principal
- Barclay Brook Elementary School with 366 students in grades PreK–2
  - Erinn Mahoney, principal
- Brookside Elementary School with 406 students in grades 3–5
  - Scott Sidler, principal
- Mill Lake Elementary School with 479 students in grades PreK–2
  - Pamela Ackerman-Garcia, principal
- Oak Tree Elementary School with 588 students in grades PreK–3
  - Patricia Dinsmore, principal
- Woodland Elementary School with 252 students in grades 3–5
  - Orsolina Cetta, principal

Middle school

- Monroe Township Middle School with 1,704 students in grades 6–8
  - James Higgins, principal

High school

- Monroe Township High School with 2,620 students in grades 9–12
  - Kevin Higgins, principal

== Administration ==
Core members of the district's administration are:

- Chari Robynne Chanley, superintendent (currently on administrative leave)
- Adam Layman, acting superintendent
- Laura Allen, business administrator and board secretary

Chanley was suspended with pay by the Board of Education in May 2025 after a series of ethics complaints. The district's Assistant Superintendent, Adam Layman, has been serving as acting superintendent since then. It is unclear if and when Chanley will be reinstated.

== Board of education ==
The district's board of education, comprised of nine elected members, sets policy and oversees the fiscal and educational operation of the district through its administration. As a Type II school district, the board's trustees are elected directly by voters to serve three-year terms of office on a staggered basis, with three seats up for election each year held (since 2012) as part of the November general election; a tenth member is appointed by the Jamesburg district to represent its interests on the Monroe Township school board. The board appoints a superintendent to oversee the district's day-to-day operations and a business administrator to supervise the business functions of the district.
