= Monroe Township High School =

High school in Middlesex County, New Jersey, US

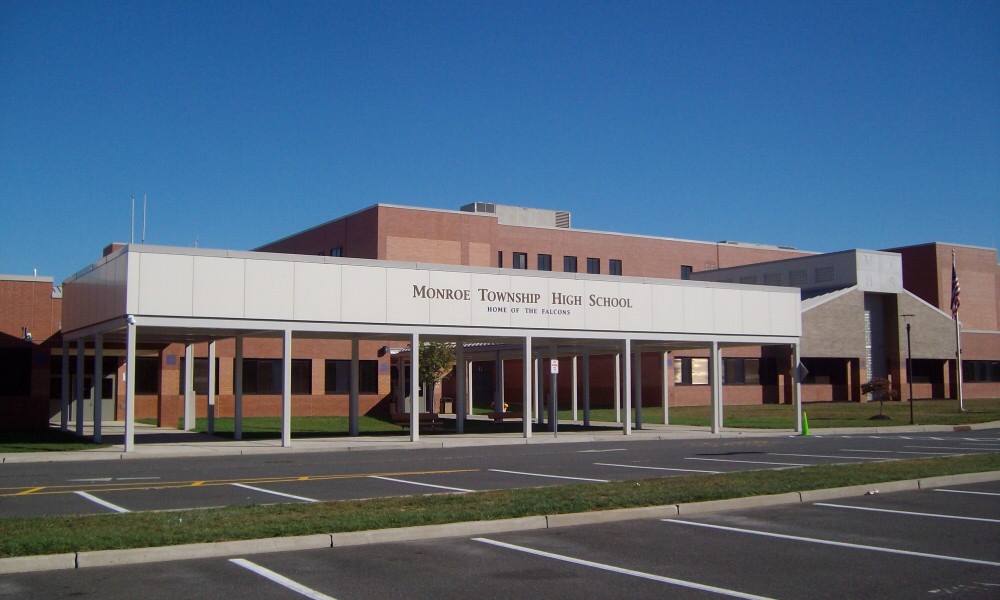

Location
- 200 Schoolhouse Road; Monroe Township, Middlesex County, New Jersey 08831; United States; 40.34719°N 74.438309°W

Information
- Type: Public High school
- Established: January 1974; 52 years ago
- School district: Monroe Township School District
- NCES School ID: 341050003438
- Principal: Kevin Higgins
- Faculty: 186.1 FTEs
- Grades: 9-12
- Enrollment: 2,620 (as of 2023–24)
- Student to teacher ratio: 14.1:1
- Colors: Purple; Vegas Gold
- Athletics conference: Greater Middlesex Conference (general); Big Central Football Conference (football)
- Team name: Falcons
- Accreditation: Middle States Association of Colleges and Schools
- Yearbook: Reflections
- Website: mths.monroe.k12.nj.us

Monroe Township High School is a comprehensive four-year public high school located in Monroe Township, in Middlesex County, in the U.S. state of New Jersey, serving students in ninth through twelfth grades part of the Monroe Township School District. The school serves students from Monroe Township and approximately 300 from Jamesburg who attend Monroe Township High School as part of a sending/receiving relationship with the Jamesburg Public Schools that has been in place since 1980. The school's mascot is a falcon and the school colors are purple and Vegas gold. The motto is "Excellence is Our Expectation".

As of the 2023–24 school year, the school had an enrollment of 2,620 students and 186.1 classroom teachers (on an FTE basis), for a student–teacher ratio of 14.1:1. There were 198 students (7.6% of enrollment) eligible for free lunch and 72 (2.7% of students) eligible for reduced-cost lunch. Based on 2021-22 data from the New Jersey Department of Education, it was the tenth-largest high school in the state and one of 29 schools with more than 2,000 students.

== History ==
The school's original building, designed to serve 1,100 students, was constructed at a cost of $4.7 million (equivalent to $30.7 million in 2025). Groundbreaking for the new facility was held in July 1971 after a bond issue to cover the costs of the building was approved by voters in May 1971, and students started using the building in January 1974.

The New Jersey Board of Education voted in May 1979 to shutdown Jamesburg High School, which with an enrollment of 182 students was the smallest in the state. Starting with the 1979-80 school year, Jamesburg began sending students to Monroe Township High School.

The Marasco Center for the Performing Arts, named for a former superintendent, was added to that building in the mid-1990s, which added an auditorium of 1,000 seats. More classrooms were added in the early 2000s.

Growth in the population of Monroe Township led to a proposal for relocation of the high school onto what was then part of the soccer fields of Thompson Park, a county-operated park located across the road from the previous high school building. Opponents of the site of the proposed high school claim that historical records show that the proposed location was the 18th century site of Bethel Indian Town. An archaeological study found mostly European artifacts in portions of the 35 acres (140,000 m^{2}) of the proposed site, with only about eight or so Native American artifacts among them. The new Monroe Township High School building was completed in time for the 2011-12 school year, despite discovery of an old farmstead on the site. With the completion of the $125 million project to create a new 365,000-square-foot (33,900 m^{2}) building for the new high school, the previous high school building (across the street from the current one) was turned into the township's middle school, and what was called "Applegarth Middle School" was converted into an elementary school building.

== Awards, recognition and rankings ==
The school was the 82nd-ranked public high school in New Jersey out of 339 schools statewide in New Jersey Monthly magazine's September 2014 cover story on the state's "Top Public High Schools", using a new ranking methodology. The school had been ranked 124th in the state of 328 schools in 2012, after being ranked 118th in 2010 out of 322 schools listed. The magazine ranked the school 113th in 2008 out of 316 schools. The school was ranked 106th in the magazine's September 2006 issue, which surveyed 316 schools across the state.

Schooldigger.com ranked the school 178th out of 381 public high schools statewide in its 2011 rankings (a decrease of 17 positions from the 2010 ranking) which were based on the combined percentage of students classified as proficient or above proficient on the mathematics (78.0%) and language arts literacy (95.0%) components of the High School Proficiency Assessment (HSPA).

The school has been accredited by the Middle States Association of Colleges and Schools Commission on Elementary and Secondary Schools and by the New Jersey Department of Education.

== Graduation requirements ==
In order to graduate from Monroe Township High School, a student must obtain a minimum of 120 credits in grades 9-12. In addition, the successful completion of certain subjects is required as follows:

- Language Arts - 20 credits
- Mathematics - 15 credits
- Science (Biology, Chemistry, Physics) - 15 credits
- Social Studies - 10 credits
- World Language - 10 credits
- Performing or Visual Arts - 5 credits
- 21st Century Life & Careers (CTE) - 5 credits
- Health and Physical Education - 5 credits (for each year enrolled)
- Financial Literacy - 5 credits

== Student activities ==
Extracurricular activities

Extracurricular activities provide an opportunity for MTHS students to explore their interests, learn, and help the community. Most "clubs" meet after school when additional buses are available for after school transportation. Some clubs meet at night, in which cases the students are responsible for their own transportation.

Clubs offered include:

- Academic Team
- The African American Club Mission Statement
- American Legion Oratorical Competition
- Animation Club
- Art Club
- Marching Band
- Jazz Ensemble
- Chess Club
- Men's Chorus
- Coach's Club
- The Computer Club
- DECA
- Ex-Animo
- International Thespian Society
- Winter Color Guard
- Environmental Action Club
- FLY Cap
- FBLA - Future Business Leaders of America
- FCCLA Family, Career, and Community Leaders of America
- Société Honoraire de Français - French National Honor Society
- Newspaper Club
- Fellowship of Christian Athletes
- Gay Straight Alliance
- History Club
- Italian Honors Society
- Jazz Dance Team
- Key Club
- ”Lights, Camera, Action!” Video Production Club
- Literary Magazine Club
- Mathletes
- Mock Trial Club
- Model UN
- Multicultural Club
- National Honor Society
- Peace Ambassadors
- Poetry Club
- The Photography Club
- Project Graduation
- Science/Robotics Club
- New Jersey Science League
- Spanish Honor Society
- Student Council
- Table Tennis Federation
- Technology Club
- Tri-M Music Honor Society
- Yearbook Club
- The Young Science Achiever's Club
- Youth and Government

Marching Falcons

The MTHS Marching Band competes in independent and USBands competitions held within New Jersey and New York. The Marching Band is currently under the direction of Shawn Nagpal. Some of the instructors have a musical past of competing in the Drum Corps International circuit or Drum Corps Associates circuit. Some of the members have even branched out and joined a drum corps. Ever since 2003, they have competed as an A Class marching band varying in sizes of around a group 5, 4, 3 or 2 band. After minor successes in the past, the Marching Falcons won first place in Group 2A at the 2013 USBands A Class National Championships in Allentown, Pennsylvania and the 2013 USBands A Class state championships in Group 2A in New Brunswick, New Jersey. In March 2014, the group was promoted from A class competition, to Open class competition because do their success in previous years. In 2018 they won Yamaha Cup in 4A with a score of 85.625. They are now a Group 4 Amateur marching band and plan on competing at the Yamaha Cup, Amateur Class State, and National Championships, as well as other local events.

== Athletics ==
The Monroe Township High School Falcons compete in the Greater Middlesex Conference, which is comprised of public and private high school in the Middlesex County area, operating under the supervision of the New Jersey State Interscholastic Athletic Association. With 1,732 students in grades 10-12, the school was classified by the NJSIAA for the 2019–20 school year as Group IV for most athletic competition purposes, which included schools with an enrollment of 1,060 to 5,049 students in that grade range. The football team competes in Division 5C of the Big Central Football Conference, which includes 60 public and private high schools in Hunterdon, Middlesex, Somerset, Union and Warren counties, which are broken down into 10 divisions by size and location. The school was classified by the NJSIAA as Group V South for football for 2024–2026, which included schools with 1,333 to 2,324 students.

Interscholastic sports for both boys' and girls' include bowling, track and field, basketball, golf, lacrosse, soccer, tennis and cross-country. Girls' only sports include softball, volleyball, and field hockey. Boys' only sports include football, baseball, ice hockey and wrestling. The team's colors are purple and Vegas gold.

The Falcons finished the 2009 season with an 11-1 record after winning the Central Jersey Group III state football title with a 30-10 victory in the championship game against a Middletown High School South team that came into the finals undefeated.

The boys' soccer team won the Group II state championship in 1987 as co-champion with Millburn High School. The Falcons were the 2012-13 Greater Middlesex Conference boys' soccer champions, defeating South Brunswick High School by the score of 2-1, to earn the program's first conference title since 2008. The team defeated Jackson Memorial High School in the Central Jersey Group IV state sectional championship by the score of 3-1, the first time that the team had won a sectional title since 1987.

The Monroe boys' bowling team won the Group III state championship in 2017.

The ice hockey team won the Kolodney Cup in 2018 with a 3-1 win against Woodbridge High School.

The Monroe boys' tennis team has had two GMC championship winners, both at 1st singles, in 2021 and 2023.

In 2023, Monroe Township High School launched New Jersey's first ever high school cricket team.

== Administration ==
The principal is Kevin Higgins. His core administration team includes four vice principals.

== Notable alumni ==
- Nick Dini (born 1993), catcher who played for the Kansas City Royals.
- Leonard Leo (born 1965, class of 1983), conservative legal activist
- Dave Meads (born 1964), former MLB relief pitcher who played for the Houston Astros
- Gordon Ryan (born 1995), accomplished Brazilian jiu-jitsu grappler
