= Harrison Woodhull Crosby =

- Born: c. 1814; Putnam, Connecticut
- Died: 1892
- Burial place: Fernwood Cemetery, Jamesburg, New Jersey
- Occupations: Chief Gardener, Lafayette College
- Notable work: Became the first person to can tomatoes commercially (1847)
- Spouse: Charlotte (Andrews) Crosby
- Parent(s): Abiel and Mary Crosby

Harrison Woodhull Crosby of Jamesburg, New Jersey was the first to can tomatoes commercially in 1847. He worked as the chief gardener at Lafayette College in Pennsylvania, where he commercialized the canned tomato.. He grew tomatoes on his farm in Jamesburg. To overcome skeptics, he sent samples of his canned tomatoes to fqmous figures of the day, including President James K. Polk and Queen Victoria.

== Life ==
Born in Putnam, Connecticut in about 1814, Crosby was a son of Abiel and Mary Crosby, and the husband of Charlotte (Andrews) Crosby. He died in 1892, and was interred at the Fernwood Cemetery in Jamesburg, New Jersey.
