= Nick Dini =

American baseball player (born 1993)

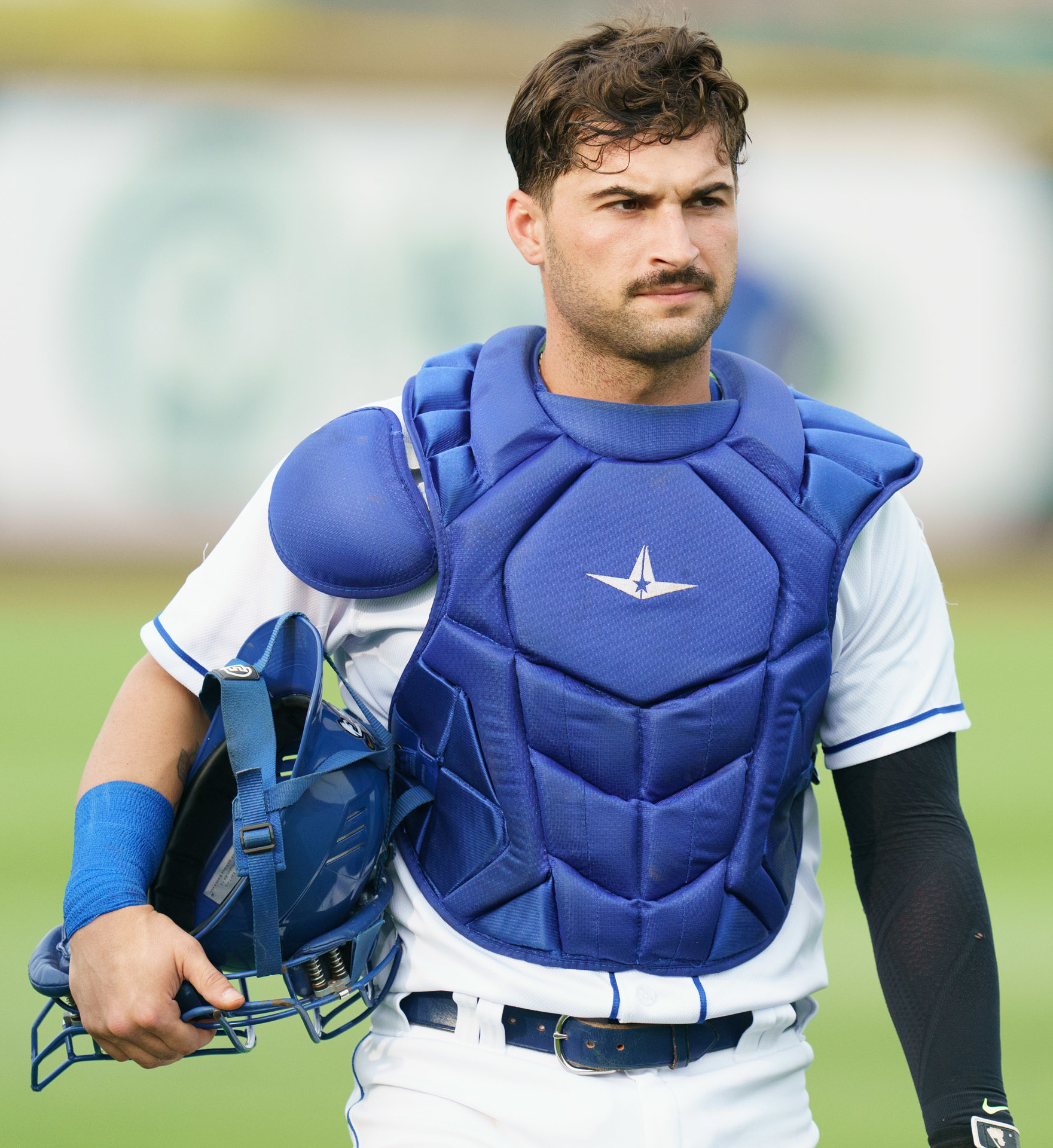
- Dini with the Omaha Storm Chasers in 2021
- Catcher
- Born: July 27, 1993 (age 33); Staten Island, New York, U.S.
- Batted: Right Threw: Right

MLB debut
- August 7, 2019, for the Kansas City Royals

Last MLB appearance
- September 29, 2019, for the Kansas City Royals

MLB statistics
- Batting average: .196
- Home runs: 2
- Runs batted in: 6
- Stats at Baseball Reference

Teams
- Kansas City Royals (2019)

Nicholas Carl Dini (born July 27, 1993) is an American former professional baseball catcher. He played in Major League Baseball (MLB) for the Kansas City Royals in 2019.

== Early life and amateur career ==
Born on Staten Island, NY, Dini later moved to Monroe Township, Middlesex County, New Jersey and attended Monroe Township High School. At Monroe, Dini became the school's all-time leader in hits (160), runs (128), doubles (41), triples (10), home runs (23) and RBI (117). He played college baseball at Wagner College. As a senior, Dini was named the Northeast Conference Player of the Year and third team All-America by Louisville Slugger after batting .392 with 44 RBI and 26 extra-base hits. Dini also set school records for hits (245), at-bats (793), and games played (215). Dini's number 22 is retired in the program.

== Professional career ==
=== Kansas City Royals ===
==== Minor leagues ====
Dini was selected by the Kansas City Royals in the 14th round of the 2015 Major League Baseball draft. After signing, Dini was assigned to the rookie-league Idaho Falls Chukars and hit .316 with four home runs and 29 RBIs in his first season of professional baseball. In 2016, Dini appeared in only 20 games with four different minor league teams due to injuries, batting .319 with nine RBIs. Dini began the 2017 season with the Single–A Lexington Legends and was promoted to the Double-A Northwest Arkansas Naturals hitting a combined .302 batting average with four home runs and 36 RBIs. He was selected by the Royals to play in the Arizona Fall League for the Surprise Saguaros following the end of the season. He started 2018 with Northwest Arkansas and was named a reserve to the Texas League All-Star Game, batting .239 in 80 games before being promoted to the Triple–A Omaha Storm Chasers for the rest of the season. He hit .333 with three home runs and six RBIs in 14 games with Omaha. Dini was a non-roster invitee to Royals spring training in 2019, but did not make the team out of camp and was assigned to Triple–A.

==== Major leagues ====
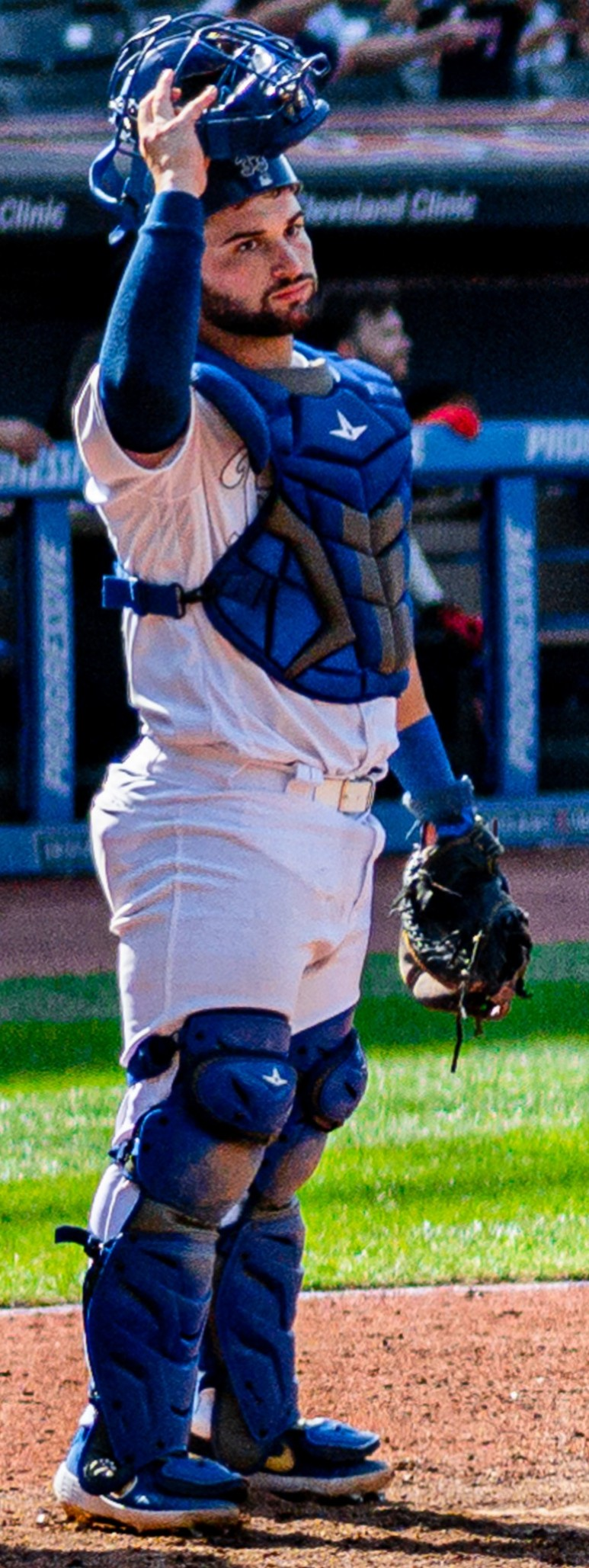
Dini in 2019 with the Kansas City Royals

Dini was called up to the Major Leagues on August 7, 2019, after catcher Cam Gallagher sustained an injury. He made his big league debut that same night as a pinch hitter for Meibrys Viloria and remained in the game as catcher. The next day, August 8, 2019, he made his first big league start at catcher against the Detroit Tigers and collecting his first career hit, a single off Matt Hall, while going 1–3 with a walk and a run scored. On August 19, 2019, Dini hit his first major league home run off of Gabriel Ynoa at Camden Yards in a 5–4 win over the Orioles. Dini finished his rookie season with a .196 batting average, two home runs, six RBIs and 11 runs scored in 20 games played. He also threw out four of ten attempted base stealers for a 40% caught-stealing average. Dini was designated for assignment on November 20, 2019.

=== New York Mets ===
On November 29, 2021, Dini signed a minor league deal with the New York Mets organization. He spent the 2022 season with the Triple–A Syracuse Mets, playing in 50 games and hitting .232/.323/.446 with a career–high 11 home runs and 37 RBI. He elected free agency following the season on November 10.

=== Tampa Bay Rays ===
On December 15, 2022, Dini signed a minor league deal with the Tampa Bay Rays. In 71 games for the Triple–A Durham Bulls, he batted .198/.356/.371 with nine home runs, 29 RBI, and six stolen bases. Dini became a free agent after the 2023 season.
