= Elmer B. Boyd Park =

Coordinates: 40.490467°N 74.436311°W

Elmer B. Boyd Memorial Park is a 20-acre municipal park running along the Raritan River in New Brunswick, New Jersey. Named after a news publisher, the park was rehabilitated and reopened in 1999 at a cost of $11 million.

The park is the location for the New Brunswick Landing, a floating dock with 24 slips available for boaters. It is part of the Middlesex County Park System.

== Gallery ==
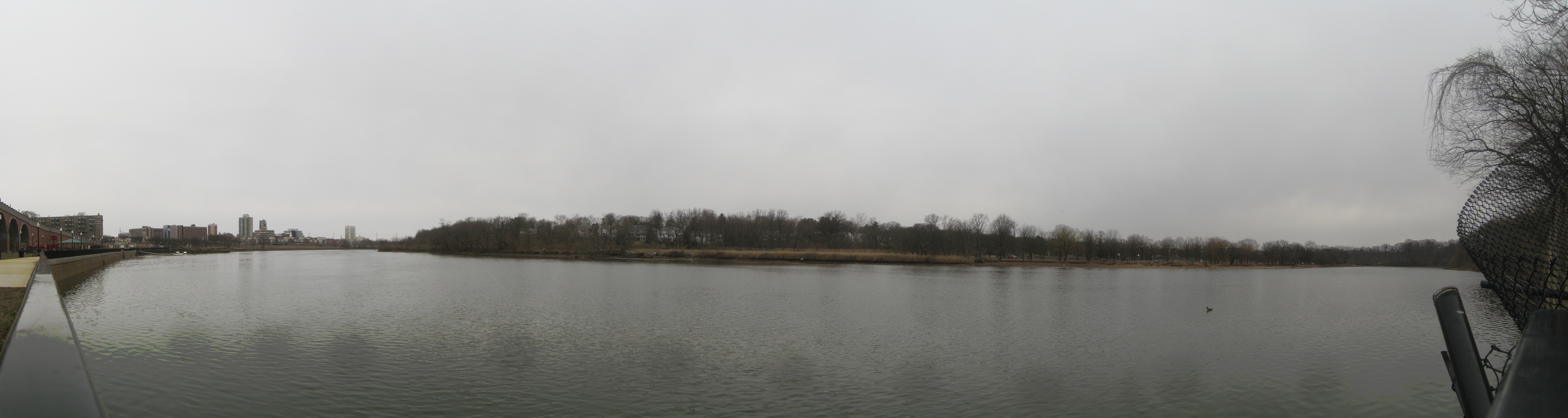
Raritan River from Boyd Park

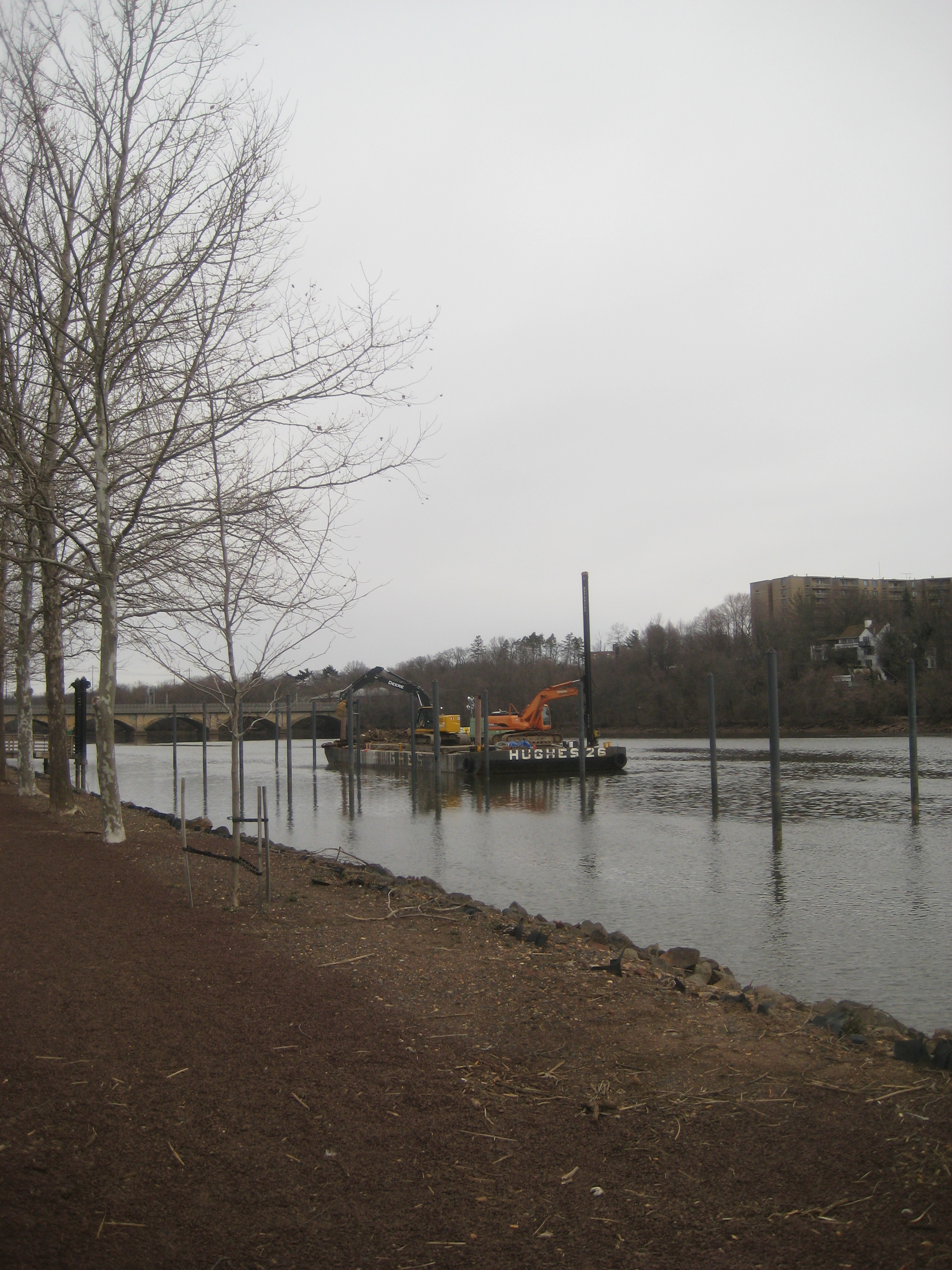
Dredging at New Brunswick Landing

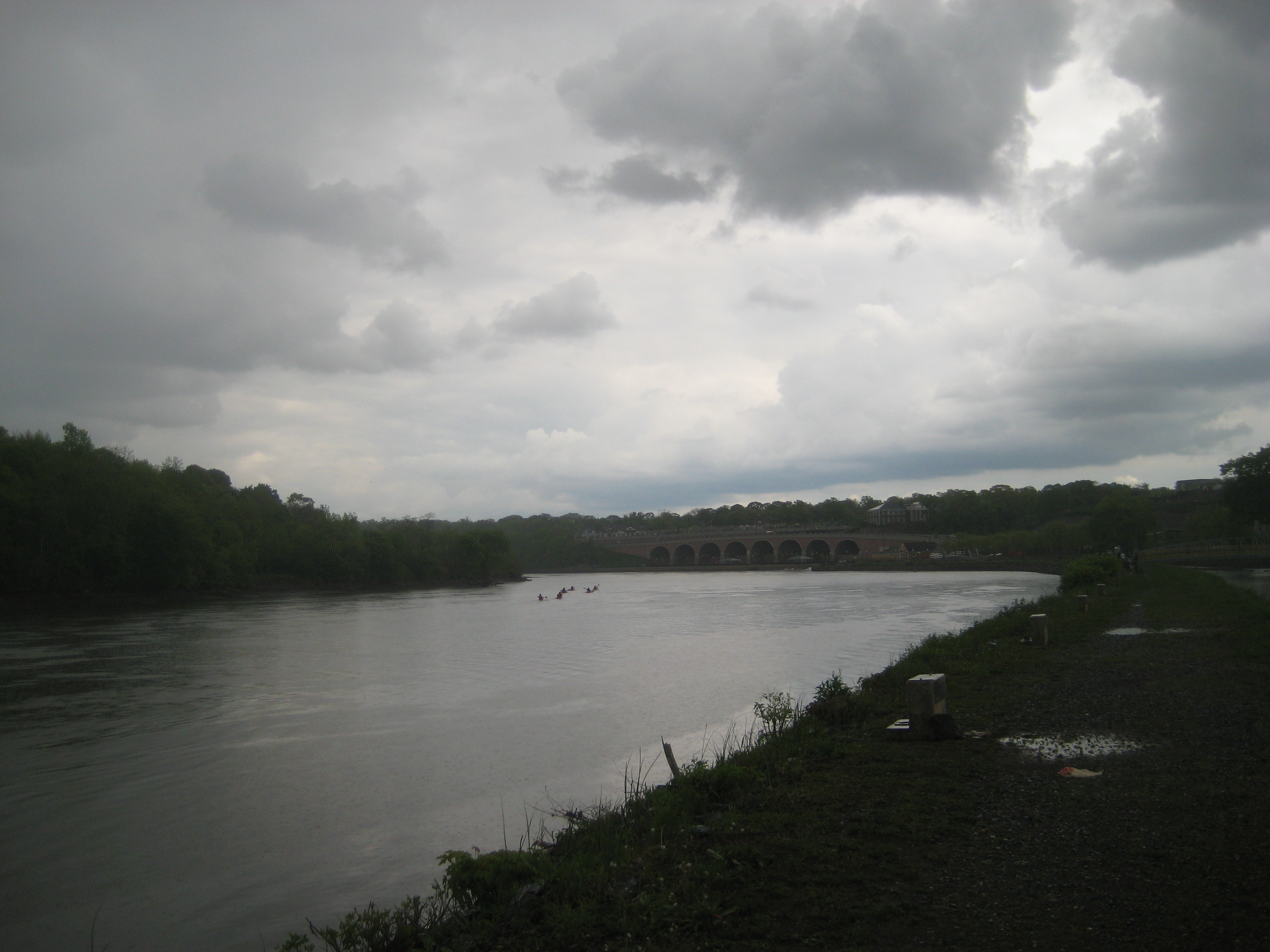
Raritan River and Route 18 from Boyd Park

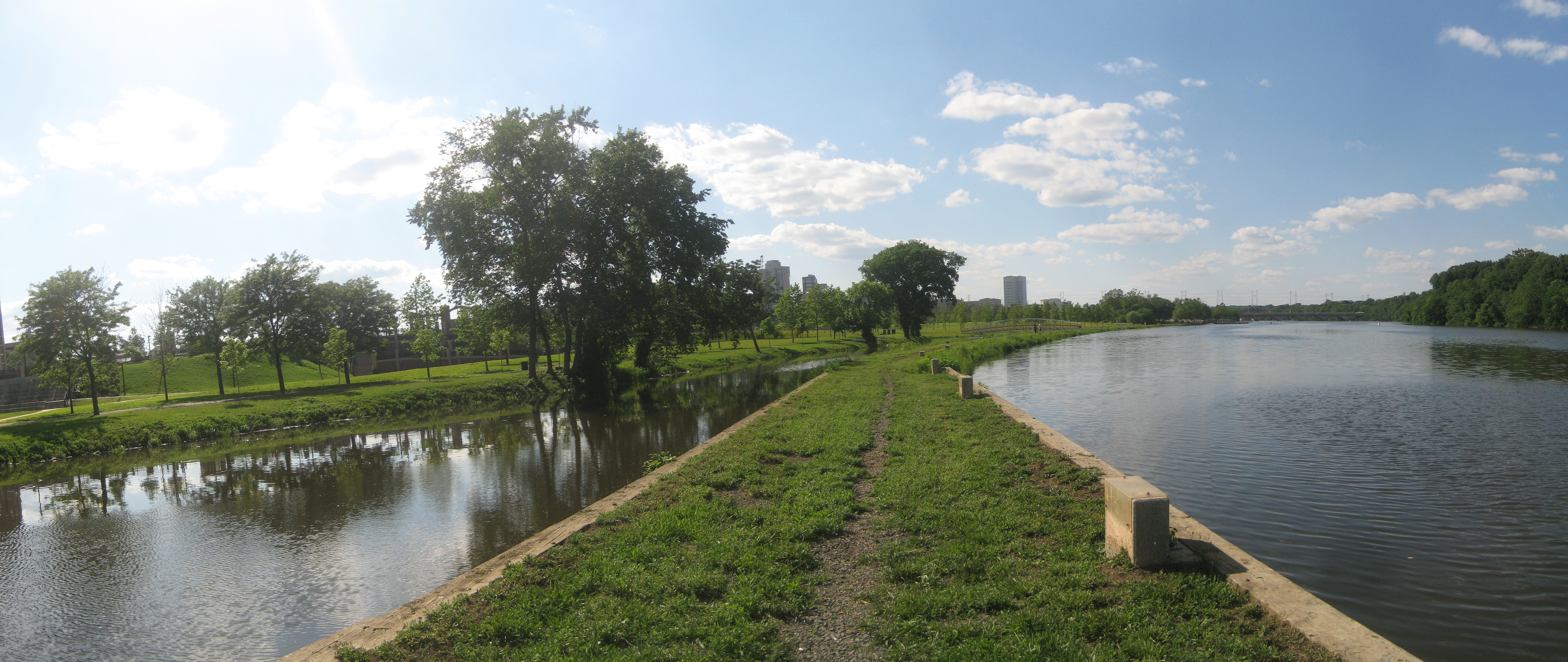
Path between the Raritan River and the D&R Canal

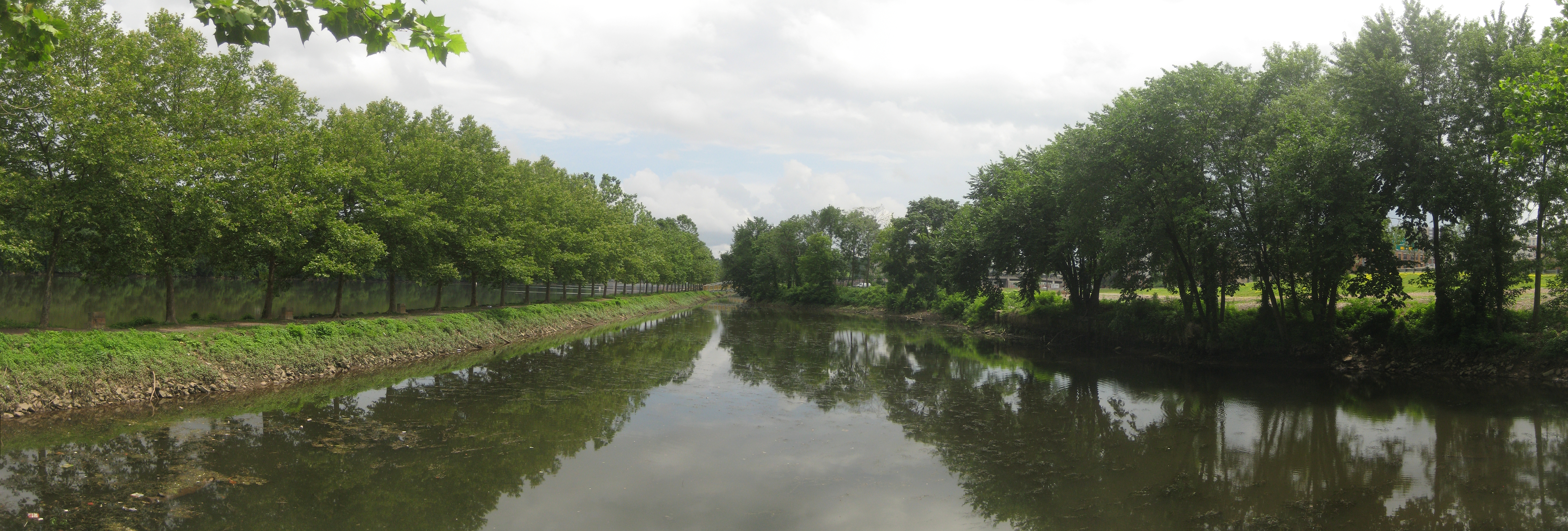
Delaware and Raritan Canal near Route 27.
