= Jamesburg Public Schools =

School district in Middlesex County, New Jersey, US

Address
- Augusta Street Jamesburg, Middlesex County, New Jersey, 08831; United States
- Coordinates: 40.353256°N 74.436997°W

District information
- Grades: PreK-8
- Superintendent: Gina Villani
- Business administrator: Atilla Sabahoglu
- Schools: 2

Students and staff
- Enrollment: 664 (as of 2020–21)
- Faculty: 64.8 FTEs
- Student–teacher ratio: 10.2:1

Other information
- District Factor Group: DE
- Website: www.jamesburg.org
Ind.	Per pupil	District spending	Rank (*)	K-8 average	%± vs. average
1A	Total Spending	$15,917	11	$18,891	−15.7%
1	Budgetary Cost	8,168	1	14,159	−42.3%
2	Classroom Instruction	5,731	1	8,659	−33.8%
6	Support Services	722	1	2,167	−66.7%
8	Administrative Cost	991	1	1,547	−35.9%
10	Operations & Maintenance	714	2	1,612	−55.7%
13	Extracurricular Activities	10	1	104	−90.4%
16	Median Teacher Salary	54,479	13	61,136
Data from NJDoE 2014 Taxpayers' Guide to Education Spending. *Of K-8 districts with 401-750 students. Lowest spending=1; Highest=64

The Jamesburg Public Schools are a community public school district that serves students in kindergarten through eighth grade from Jamesburg, in Middlesex County, in the U.S. state of New Jersey.

As of the 2020–21 school year, the district, comprising two schools, had an enrollment of 664 students and 64.8 classroom teachers (on an FTE basis), for a student–teacher ratio of 10.2:1.

The district is classified by the New Jersey Department of Education as being in District Factor Group "DE", the fifth-highest of eight groupings. District Factor Groups organize districts statewide to allow comparison by common socioeconomic characteristics of the local districts. From lowest socioeconomic status to highest, the categories are A, B, CD, DE, FG, GH, I and J.

Since the 1979-80 school year, Jamesburg's high school students have attended Monroe Township High School in Monroe Township, as part of a sending/receiving relationship with the Monroe Township School District. As of the 2020–21 school year, the high school had an enrollment of 2,474 students and 184.1 classroom teachers (on an FTE basis), for a student–teacher ratio of 13.4:1.

== History ==
Jamesburg High School, which was founded in 1905, graduated its last class in June 1979. The first building to house the high school was eventually demolished and replaced by the current Grace M. Breckwedel Middle School building. The second building that housed the high school was turned into an office complex, which is known as Forsgate Commons. It is located on the intersection of Forsgate Drive and Davison Avenue, directly behind the district's John F. Kennedy Elementary School.

With annual tuition costs per student at Monroe Township High School rising past $16,000 as the Monroe district has added debt service costs into their tuition charges, the Jamesburg Public Schools has looked for an alternate high school in the area to send students at lower cost, which would have started with the freshman class in 2012-13, though students already enrolled at Monroe Township High School would continue their attendance there until they graduate. The Jamesburg district contacted 18 districts and received interest from high schools in the Freehold Regional High School District, Matawan-Aberdeen, Old Bridge, South Amboy and West Windsor-Plainsboro, which had been sent demographic information in July 2011 about the Jamesburg high school population as part of their review process. However, in October 2011, the district decided to continue sending their high school students to Monroe Township.

== Schools ==
Schools in the district (with 2020–21 enrollment data from the National Center for Education Statistics) are:

Elementary school

- John F. Kennedy Elementary School with 463 students in grades PreK-5
  - Kristy DeFazio, principal

Middle school

- Grace M. Breckwedel Middle School with 193 students in grades 6-8. The school offers opportunities for middle school students to participate in the National Honor Society, Student Senate, Band, and theme-based research projects.
  - Chad Donahue, principal

== Administration ==
Core members of the district's administration are:

- Gina Villani, superintendent
- Atilla Sabahoglu, business administrator

== Board of education ==
The district's board of education, comprised of seven members, sets policy and oversees the fiscal and educational operation of the district through its administration. As a Type II school district, the board's trustees are elected directly by voters to serve three-year terms of office on a staggered basis, with either two or three seats up for election each year held (since 2012) as part of the November general election. The board appoints a superintendent to oversee the district's day-to-day operations and a business administrator to supervise the business functions of the district.
