= Joseph Warren Scott =

Joseph Warren Scott (November 21, 1778 – April 27, 1871) was Colonel in the New Jersey Militia who lived in New Brunswick, New Jersey.

He was born to Moses Scott, the senior surgeon during the US Revolutionary War. Moses named Joseph Warren Scott I, for his friend Joseph Warren who died during the Battle of Bunker Hill. Joseph graduated from Princeton University in 1795, then married Jane Griffiths (c1780-1821) and had a daughter: Lavinia Agnes Scott, who married Richard Varick Dey. Joseph obtained a law degree, and, in 1821, he bought "The White House" in New Brunswick, New Jersey and named it Buccleuch.

In 1808, he was a Captain in the Middlesex Regiment and served in the War of 1812. In the Presidential election of 1824 Scott was elected as a Jackson elector. In 1829, he was promoted to Colonel. He was the oldest member of the New Jersey bar when he died in New Brunswick at the age of 93.

Colonel Scott became a hereditary member of the New Jersey Society of the Cincinnati in 1825, and served as the national society's Treasurer General from 1838 to 1872.
