= Thompson Park (Middlesex County, New Jersey) =

Park in Middlesex County, New Jersey

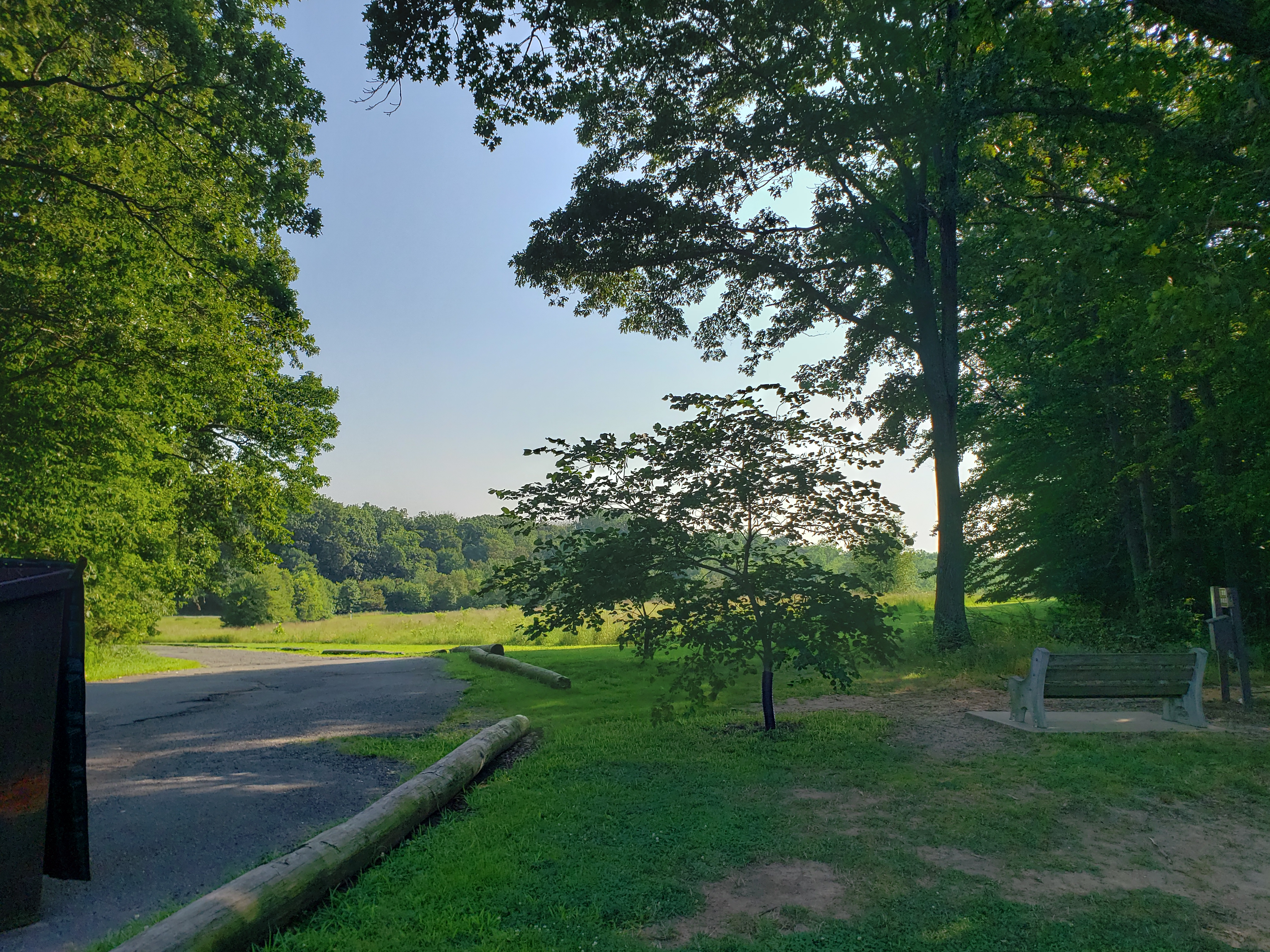
- Fields and forest near a parking lot in the park.
- Interactive map of Thompson Park
- Type: Suburban county park and nature reservation
- Location: Monroe Township, New Jersey, United States
- Coordinates: 40.341702°N 74.432028°W
- Area: 678 acres (2.74 km^{2})
- Created: 2011
- Owner: Middlesex County
- Operator: Middlesex County Park System
- Open: Dawn-Dusk
- Status: Open all year
- Hiking trails: 7
- Habitats: Northeastern coastal forests, Pine Barrens
- Designation: Developed Park
- Website: Park web page

Thompson Park is part of the Middlesex County Park System in Middlesex County, New Jersey, United States. Largely in Monroe Township with a portion in Jamesburg, the park includes playgrounds, sports facilities, animal enclosures, and hiking trails. The park is connected to sports fields operated by Monroe Township High School. It is the largest park in the Middlesex County Park System, and features Lake Manalapan at its center.

The park is connected to Thompson Park Conservation Area, an undeveloped 900-acre (360 ha) tract of heavily wooded forests and swamps along the Manalapan Brook. Combined with additional state lands, the park is part of some 2,000 acres (810 ha) of green space. In 2023, efforts were launched to preserve an adjacent 34-acre (14 ha) farm.

A major feature of the park is the 30-acre (12 ha) Manalapan Lake, created from a dammed section of Manalapan Brook. The park includes mature secondary forest with trees such as tulip poplar, oak and hickory. An area of the park lies within the Spotswood outlier of the New Jersey Pine Barrens. Wildlife is typical of the Northeastern coastal forests, including wild turkey and deer.

== History ==
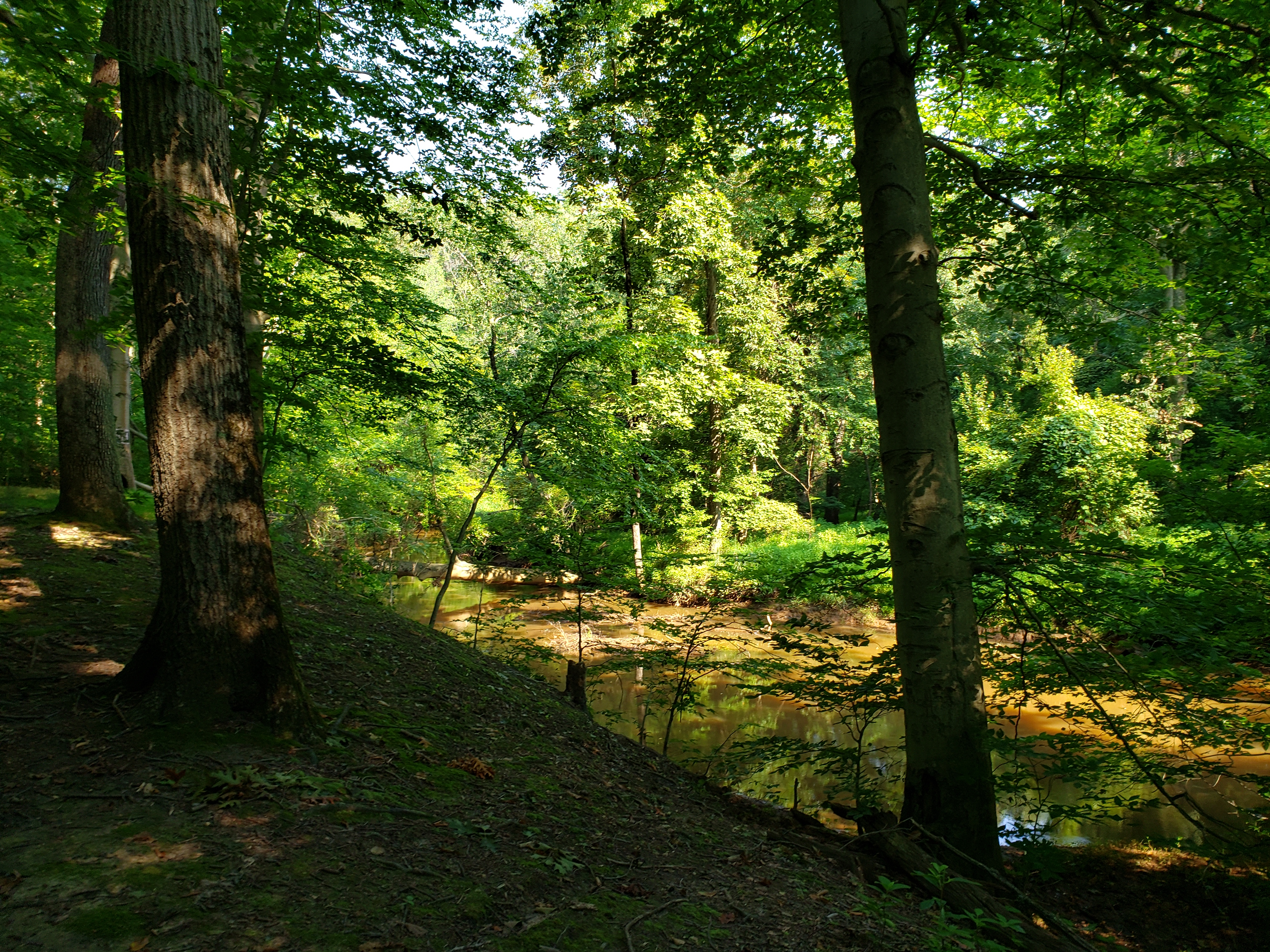
The Manalapan Brook winds through the eastern part of the park, eventually emptying into Lake Manalapan

The land around Thompson Park was settled in the late 17th century. Later, David Brainerd established a Native American mission "Bethel", on what is presently park lands. The mission had a population of 160 living in log cabins, with a school, church and 80 acres (32 ha) of cultivated lands. The county started acquiring land for the park in 1955 and 1956, and the park was expanded in the following years.

In 2021, a woman was found deep in the woods after getting lost and missing for two days. She was found off trail by a biker who called police and aided in her rescue.

In 2023, a man's body was recovered from the lake in the park.

The park has been used for cross country running races.

== Activities and facilities ==
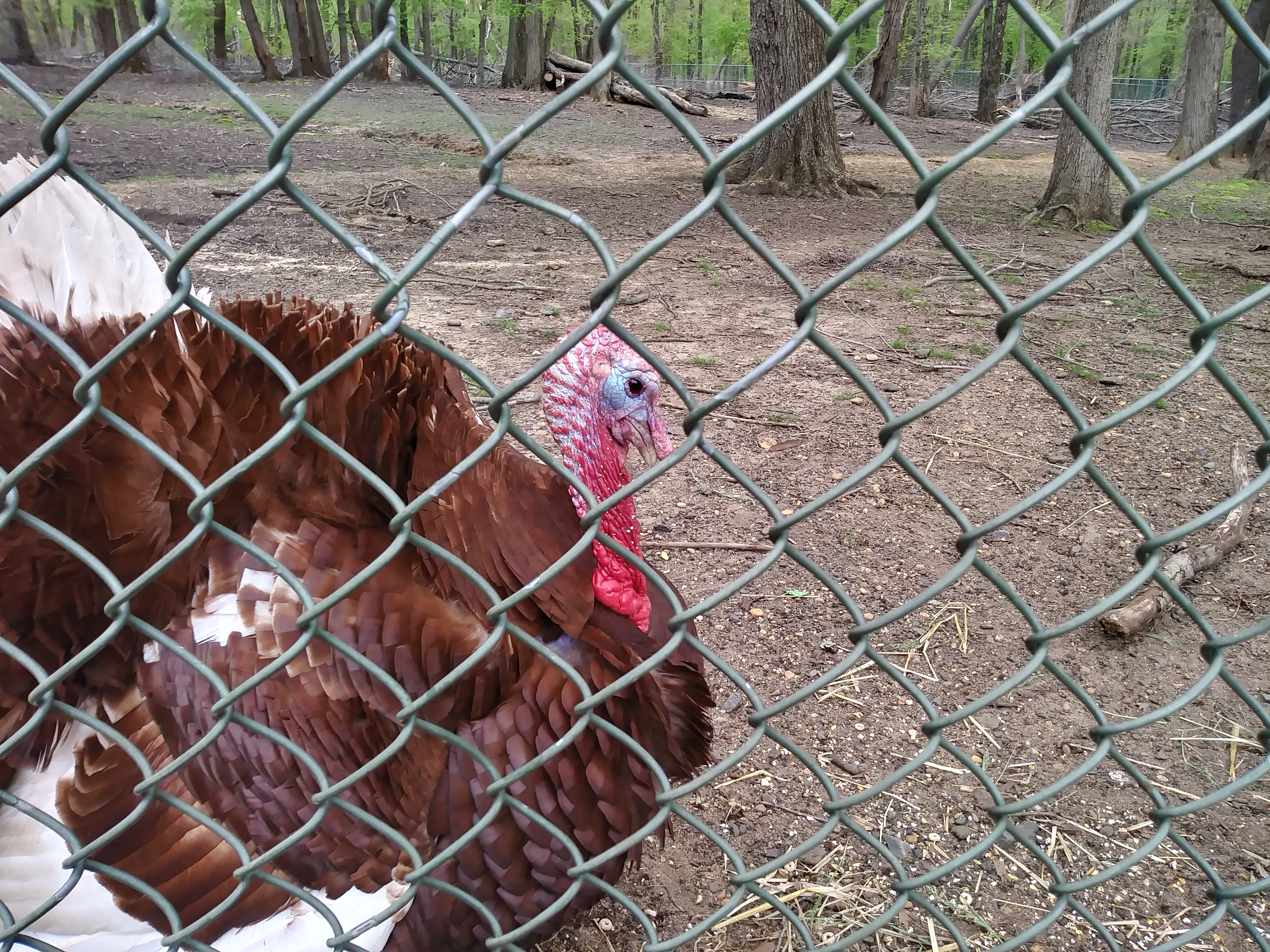
A domestic turkey in Thompson Park

The park offers tennis, basketball, handball, baseball, softball, beach volleyball and soccer fields. In addition, it offers picnic areas, three playgrounds and a dog park. On Lake Manalapan, fishing and boating are allowed. Unique features of the park include a natural spring, and a "animal haven" where both exotic and native wildlife are on display in enclosures. The natural spring was closed in 2023 after being deemed “Not Safe For Human Consumption.”

Additionally, the park offers seven hiking trails:

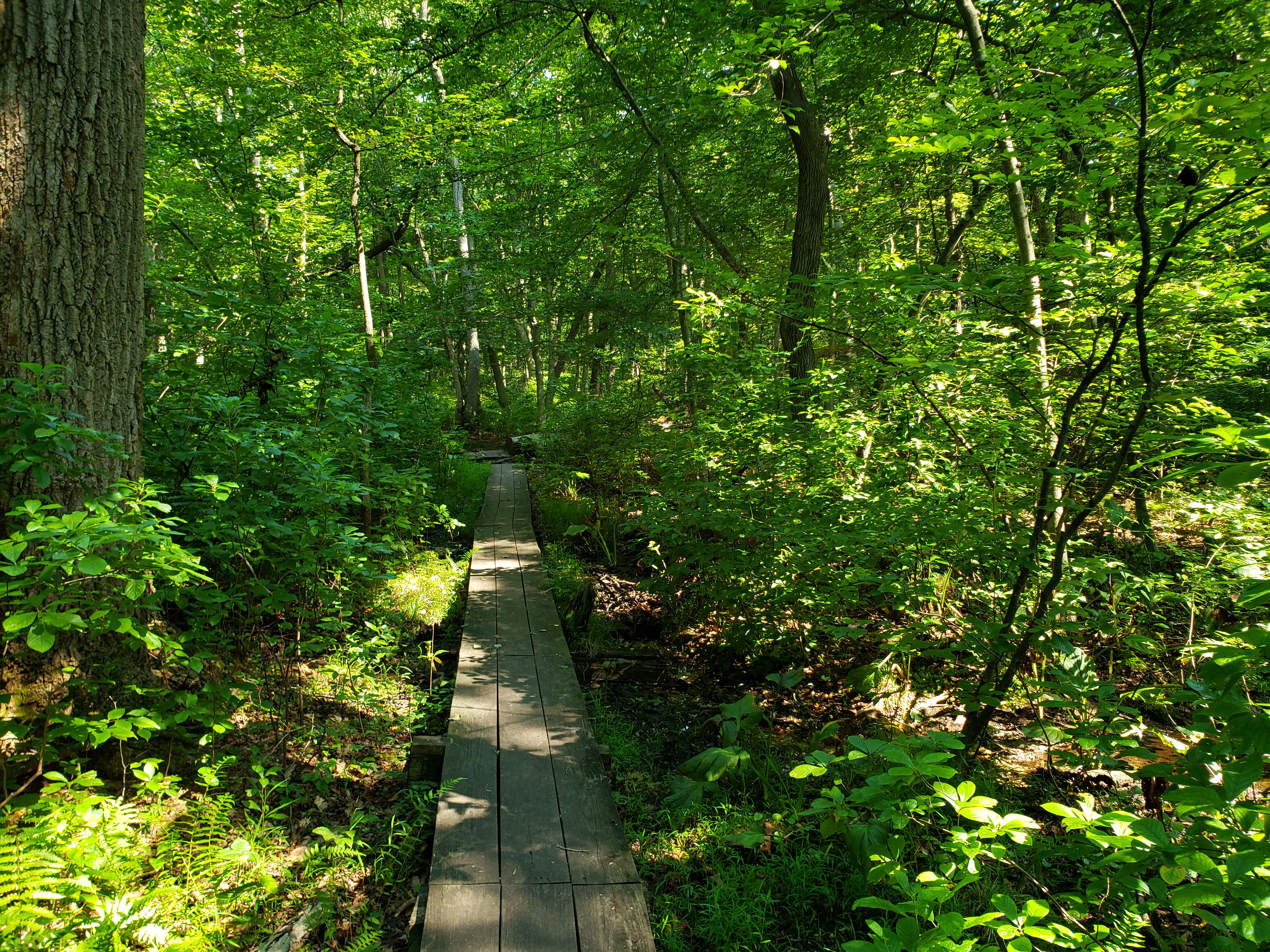
A boardwalk in a swampy region of Thompson Park

- The Red Trail , traverses 1.63-mile (2.62 km) of upland forests and passes by Manalapan Brook and associated wetlands.
- The Yellow Trail, is .90-mile (1.45 km) long, and traverses hilly woodland.
- The Blue Trail, at .97-mile (1.56 km) long, and follows the Manalapan Brook and its various tributaries.
- The Green Trail, at .69-mile (1.11 km), runs through pine plantations and crosses boardwalk.
- The White Trail, .69-mile (1.11 km) long, connects the main trail system to Manalapan Lake and the Animal Haven.
- The Orange Trail, .69-mile (1.11 km), passes a meandering brook and offers connection to other trails.
- The conservation area is mostly undeveloped, offering self-guided hiking and bird-watching on its three trails.

== General information ==
The park has a wide array of amenities, making it popular for families. It includes a playground, basketball courts, tennis courts, a disc golf course, a dog park, and open fields for other forms of recreation. On the shores of Lake Manalapan is an artificial beach, with volleyball nets. There are also various picnic grounds and gazebos.

== Thompson Park Conservation Area ==
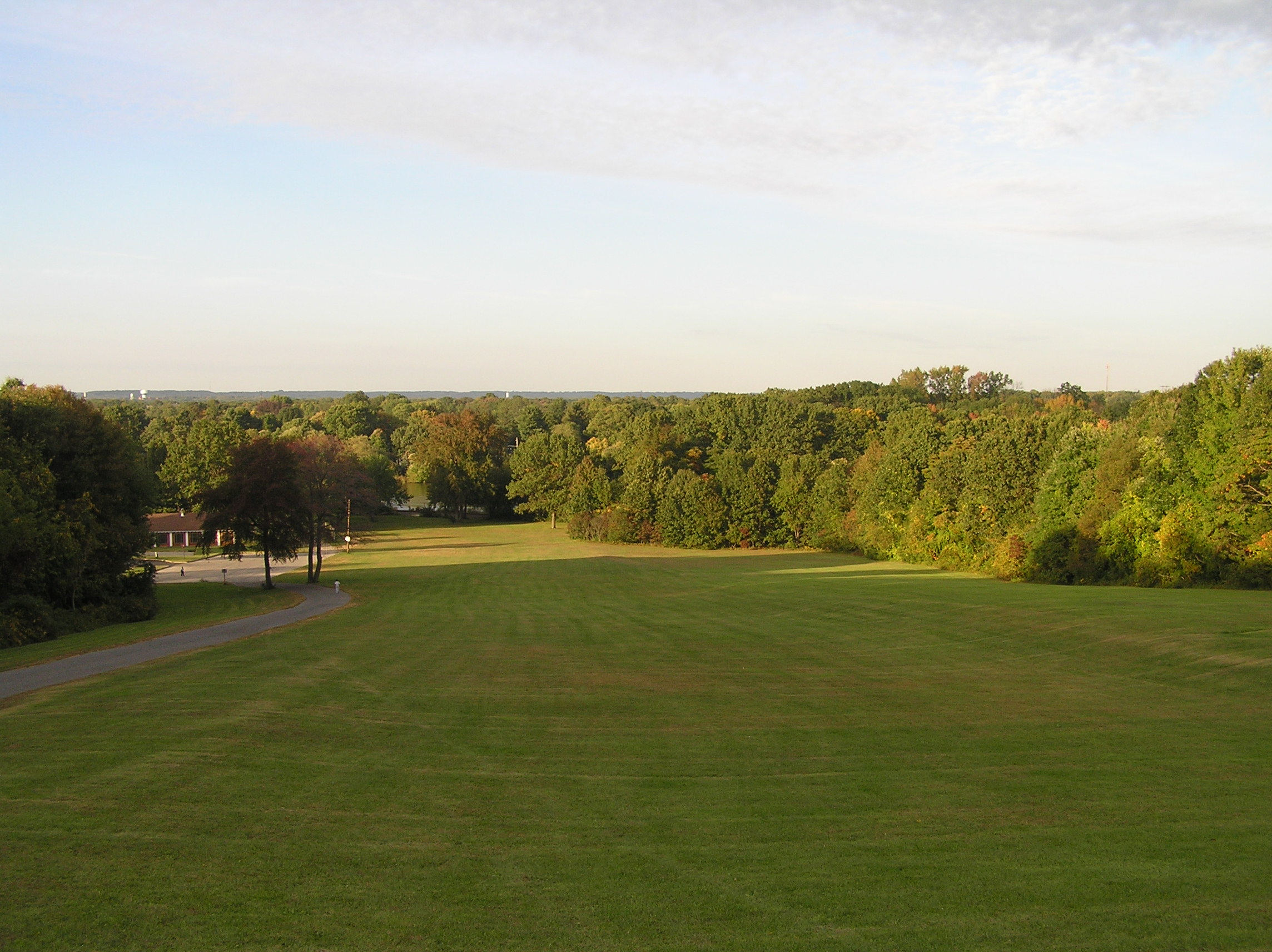
Birds eye view of Thompson Park

The nature reservation at Thompson Park totals about 925 acres (374 ha) and stretches from the main section of Thompson Park on Schoolhouse Road to the Gravel Hill. The heavily wooded reservation is located along the Manalapan Brook, with some of the land still being utilized by local farmers in cultivating crops. The reservation features roughly 9 miles (14 km) of easy-to-moderate trails. There are two main trails, the main 8-mile (13 km) Hoffman Station trail connects to the rest of Thompson Park through open fields and is considered easier. The shorter Gravel Hill trail traverses through hills and forestland, but is considered harder. Other activities such as walking, bird watching, and photography. Hunting is also allowed along the heavily forested Gravel Hill trail, but not on the more open Hoffman Station trail.

== Thompson Park Zoo ==
Until 2024, the park featured a small fenced in zoo. The zoo had various native and exotic animals on display. Some of these animals include goats, pigs, emu, deer, turkeys, and peacocks. In response to concerns from local residents and lobbying from the animal protection organization In Defense of Animals, the zoo was closed on 8 February 2024, and the animals rehomed.

== Lake Manalapan ==
Located along the course of Manalapan Brook, Lake Manalapan is at the center of this park. Despite its name, the body of water is more akin to a pond rather than a traditional lake. Lake Manalapan is a popular place for fishermen and fisherwomen for freshwater fishing. The pond features a diverse species of fish, such as bass, bluegill, yellow perch, and black crappie. Other water activities such as kayaking and rowing are also popular, (although motorboats are not allowed on the lake).

== See also ==
- There is another Thompson Park that is nearby, located in the community of Lincroft within Middletown Township in Monmouth County
