= Middlesex Greenway (Middlesex) =

45-mile trail in Middlesex, England

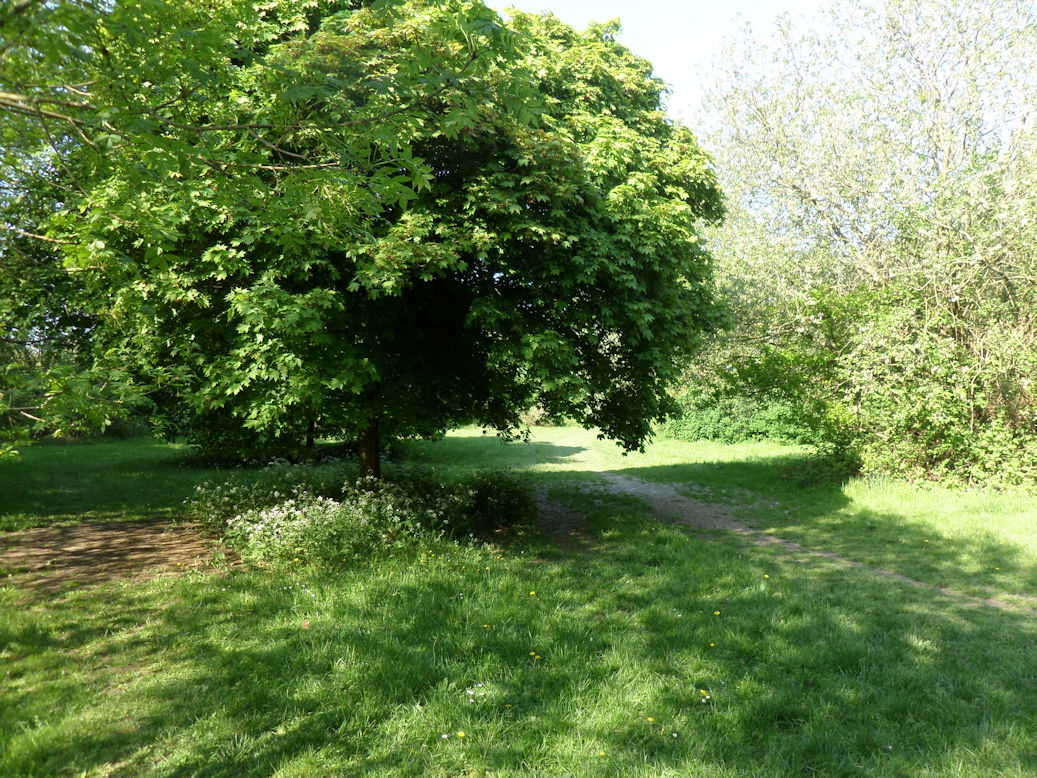
- Length: 45 mi (72 km)
- Location: Middlesex, England
- Trailheads: Staines-upon-Thames; Enfield Lock
- Use: Hiking
- Highest point: 150.2 m
- Lowest point: 14.2 m
- Difficulty: Easy

The Middlesex Greenway is a long-distance walking route along the western and northern edges of the historic county of Middlesex, England.

The route is 45 miles long and was devised by Stephen Collins, who walked it over two days in 1990.

The trailheads are:

- Staines-upon-Thames
- North of Enfield Lock
