= Middlesex Greenway (New Jersey) =

- Length: 3.5 mi (5.6 km)
- Location: Middlesex County, New Jersey
- Trailheads: Metuchen; Woodbridge Township
- Use: Running, hiking, cycling
- Difficulty: Easy
- Season: Year round
- Surface: Asphalt
- Right of way: Lehigh Valley Railroad

The Middlesex Greenway is a 3.5 miles (5.6 km) rail trail Metuchen, Edison and Woodbridge Township in Middlesex County, New Jersey. It is part of the Middlesex County Park System. It makes up a portion of the East Coast Greenway.

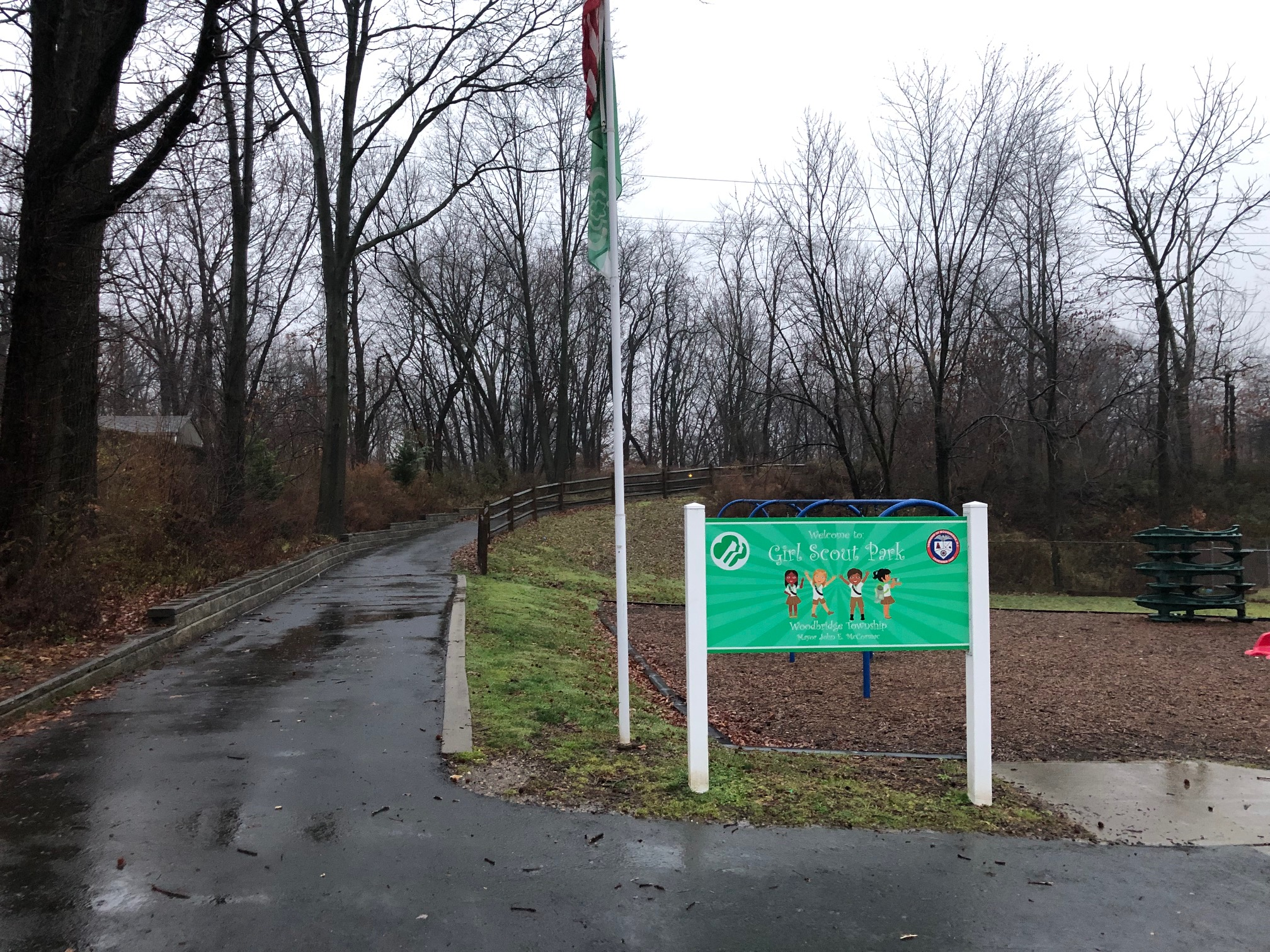
The eastern trailhead of the Middlesex Greenway can be found in Girl Scout Park on East William Street in Woodbridge, NJ (40°31'25.7"N 74°18'07.7"W)

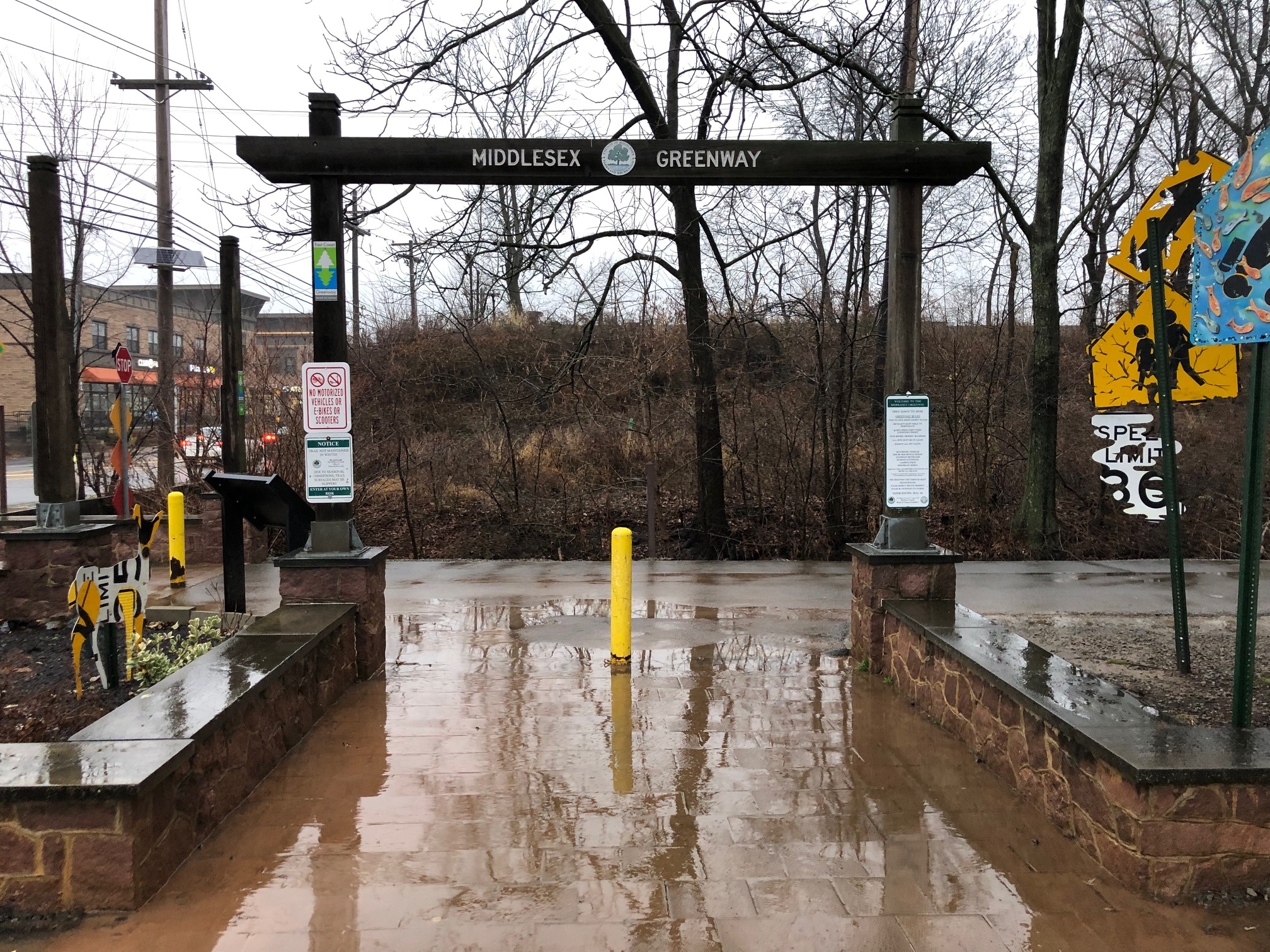
The western trailhead of the Middlesex Greenway can be found in Greenway Park on Middlesex Ave in Metuchen, NJ (40°32'23.0"N 74°22'05.6"W)

The trail begins at Girl Scout Park on William Street in the Fords/Keasbey section of Woodbridge Township and terminates in Metuchen at Greenway Park on Middlesex Avenue, with 12 entry points. Construction costs were $5 million. Expansion to Perth Amboy and South Plainfield has also been proposed.

== History ==
The trail's roadbed originates from the Easton and Amboy Railroad created by the Lehigh Valley Railroad in 1875 to transport anthracite coal to a transfer dock in Perth Amboy for subsequent delivery to New York City. The line was consolidated into Conrail with other bankrupt railroads in 1976, and abandoned in 1991.

Using open space funds, Middlesex County purchased the roadbed from Conrail in December 2002 for approximately $50,000. In 2004, Edison elected officials challenged NJDOT's plan to replace an original railroad trestle with a 140-foot-long tunnel-like structure to carry the trail under U.S. Route 1. The proposed culvert would have reduced the trail's capacity to a 14-foot-wide by 10-foot-high passageway, potentially preventing mounted police from traversing the highway. NJDOT eventually agreed to construct a pedestrian bridge in lieu of the culvert.

In 2005 Middlesex County acquired 2.68 acres (1.08 ha) of land adjacent to the trail to build a park along a portion of the abandoned roadbed at a cost of $1.25 million Middlesex County and $100,000 from Metuchen. The trail officially opened in 2012.

In 2021, the greenway became a component of the September 11th National Memorial Trail.

== Route description ==
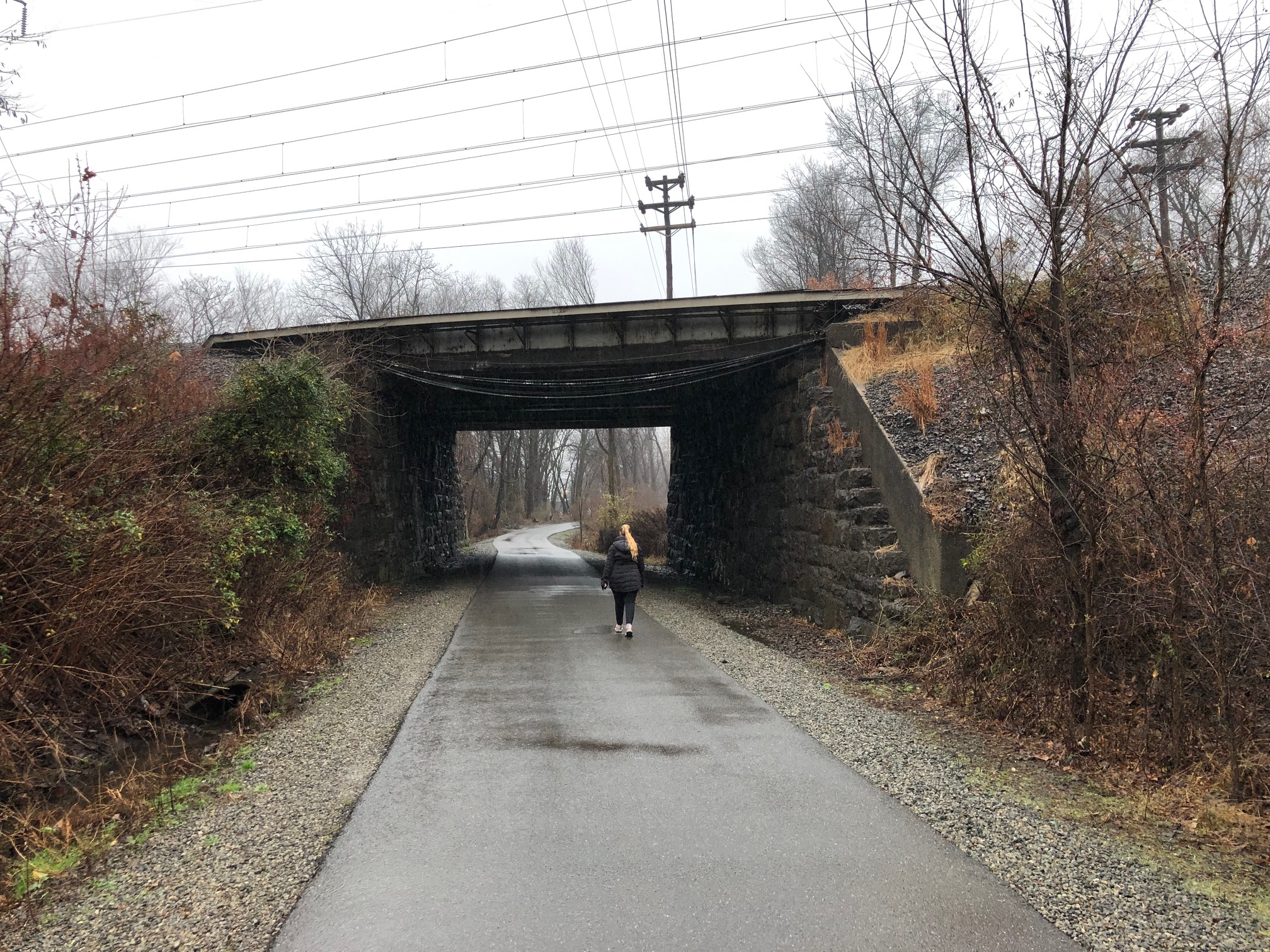
Near the western trailhead the Middlesex Greenway passes under rail lines for the Northeast Corridor. Amtrak's Acela utilizes the rails above. The stone abutments are dated 1914. Photo taken at 40°32'19.6"N 74°22'01.2"W facing east.

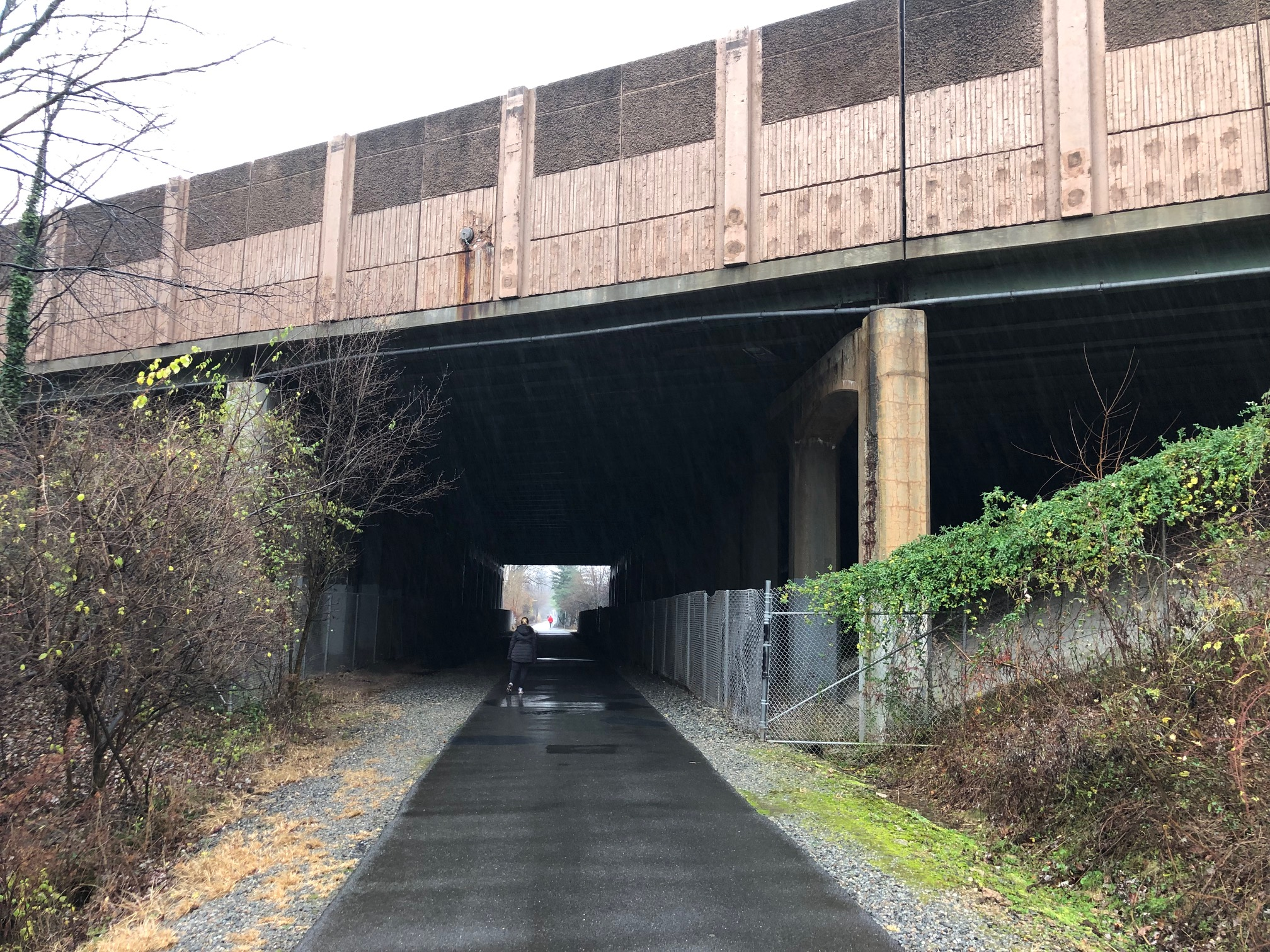
The Middlesex Greenway passes under the New Jersey Turnpike (I-95) at roughly 1.9 miles from the western trailhead. This underpass was constructed in 1951 when the Turnpike was built over the Lehigh Valley Railroad. Photo taken at 40°31'50.7"N 74°20'03.1"W facing east.

Beginning at the western trailhead, the trail starts on Middlesex Avenue in Metuchen, and goes through an initial section which goes Southeast, and goes under the North East Corridor tracks. Upon leaving the underpass, the trail turns more eastward, and goes parallel to Memorial Parkway right alongside the Memorial Park, and then goes under Route 27. After crossing Route 27, the trail goes into a below street level section which continues under a footbridge at Graham Avenue, and shortly after goes under Route 531. The Greenway continues through a residential area in Metuchen, before the trail crosses the border into Edison and arrives at Pierson Avenue. The trail then goes over Route 1 on an overpass, which comes down after crossing into the Clara Barton section of Edison. The trail then crosses through Starkin Road, and then crosses Jackson Avenue right next to Herbert Hoover Middle School. The greenway crosses Liddle Avenue, and then goes under the New Jersey Turnpike before arriving at Woodbridge Avenue, which the trail crosses. The trail goes through several more blocks alongside residential homes, before going under King Georges Post Road at the Edison/Woodbridge Border, parallel to Route 440. The greenway goes next to the Hillside Gardens apartments before crossing under Crows Mill Road. The trail ends at the eastern trailhead about a block before the Garden State Parkway at Girl Scout Park on East William Street in Woodbridge Township.

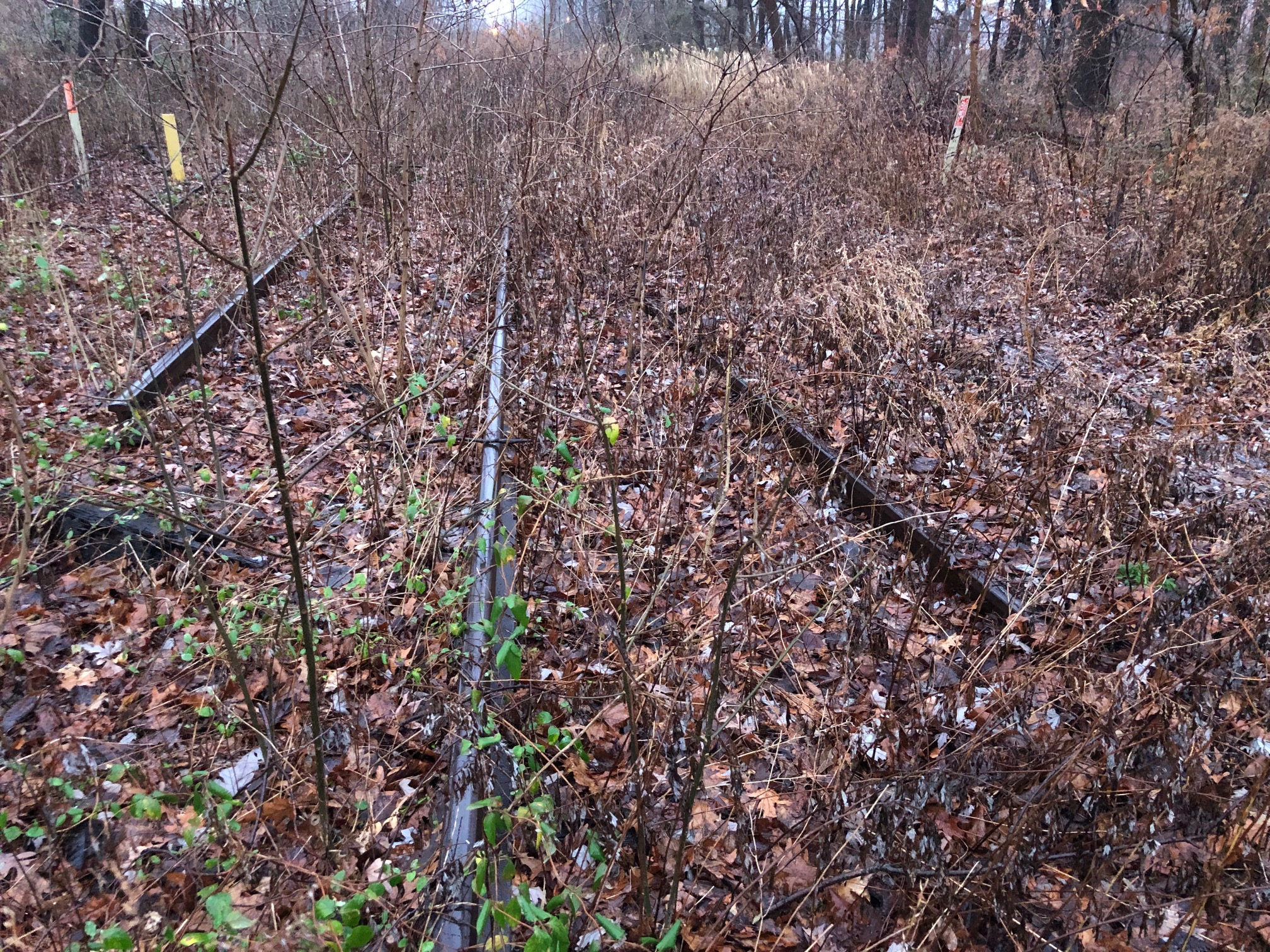
Tracks from the Leigh Valley Railroad can still be found near the eastern trailhead where the Middlesex Greenway makes a sharp turn towards East William Street. Photo taken at 40°31'24.1"N 74°18'09.3"W facing east.

No railroad infrastructure remains along the Middlesex Greenway route. However, near the eastern trailhead just past where the trail makes a sharp turn towards East William Street, some of the railroad tracks of the Lehigh Valley Railroad can be seen.

== Trail heads ==
- Woodbridge Township, Crows Mill Road, Woodbridge
- Metuchen, Middlesex Avenue, Metuchen

== See also ==
- Assunpink Trail
- Delaware and Raritan Canal Trail
- Henry Hudson Trail
- Lenape Trail
- West Essex Trail
