= Buckelew Mansion =

Historic house in New Jersey, United States

- Ensley-Mount-Buckelew House
- U.S. National Register of Historic Places
- New Jersey Register of Historic Places
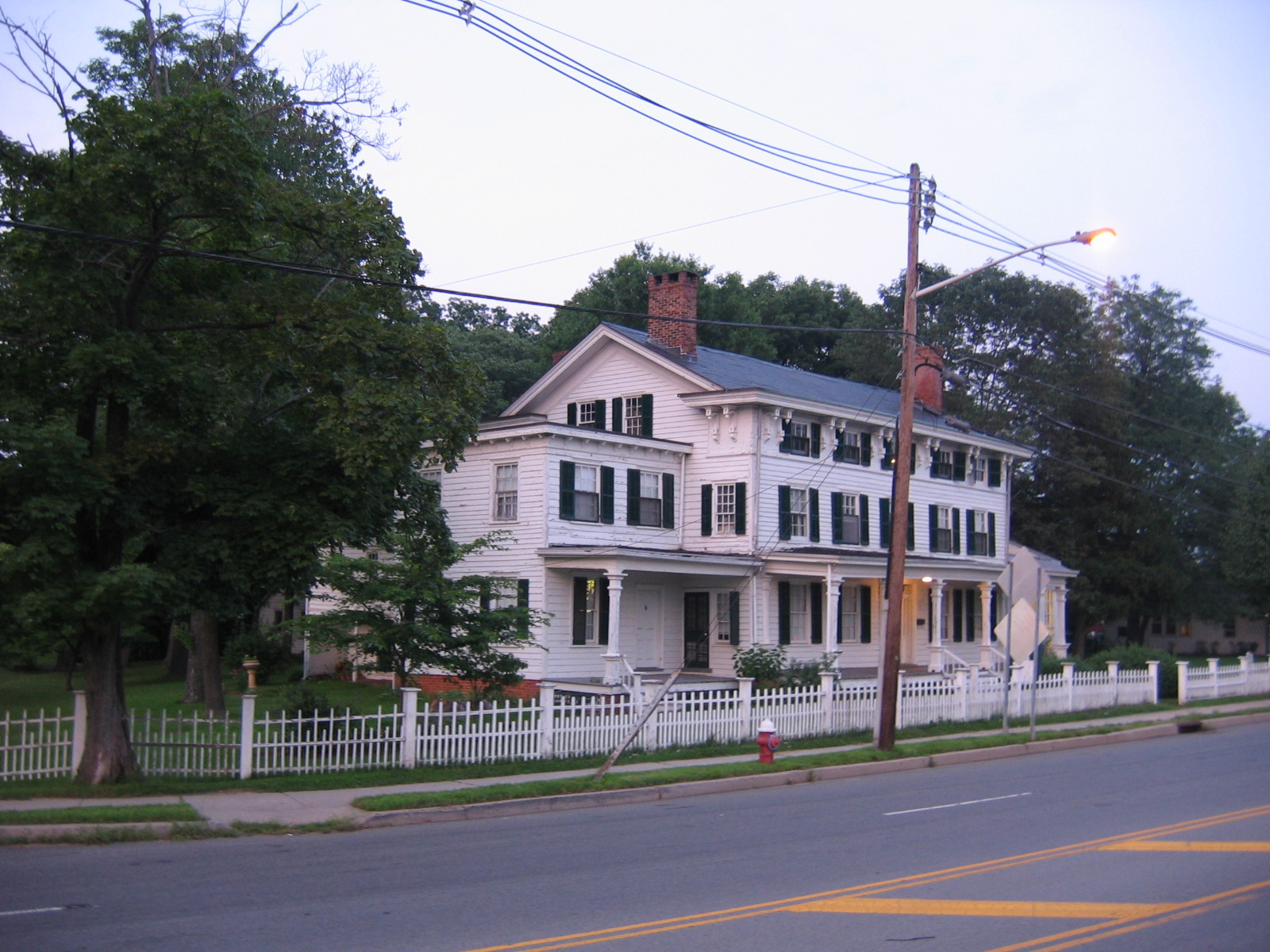

- Location within Middlesex County, New Jersey Location within New Jersey Location within the United States
- Location: Buckelew Avenue; Jamesburg, New Jersey
- Coordinates: 40°20′50″N 74°26′02″W
- Built: 1685
- Architectural style: Federal
- NRHP reference No.: 79001507
- NJRHP No.: 1843

Significant dates
- Added to NRHP: September 12, 1979
- Designated NJRHP: July 5, 1979

Buckelew Mansion, also known as Lakeview, is a historic home in Jamesburg, Middlesex County, New Jersey, United States. It now serves as a museum of local history and the headquarters of the Jamesburg Historical Association.

== History ==
A single room at its creation in 1685, the residence expanded over following centuries to become the 23 room mansion it is today. The single-story structure became two during the ownership of James Buckelew, who took up residence with his new wife in 1829 and expanded the house to accommodate his growing family and reflect his community prestige. A third story was added during the 1870s.

The mansion was listed on the New Jersey Register of Historic Places and National Register of Historic Places in 1979 as the Ensley-Mount-Buckalew House.

== See also ==
- List of the oldest buildings in New Jersey
- National Register of Historic Places listings in Middlesex County, New Jersey
