= Jamesburg, New Jersey =

Borough in Middlesex County, New Jersey, US

- Borough
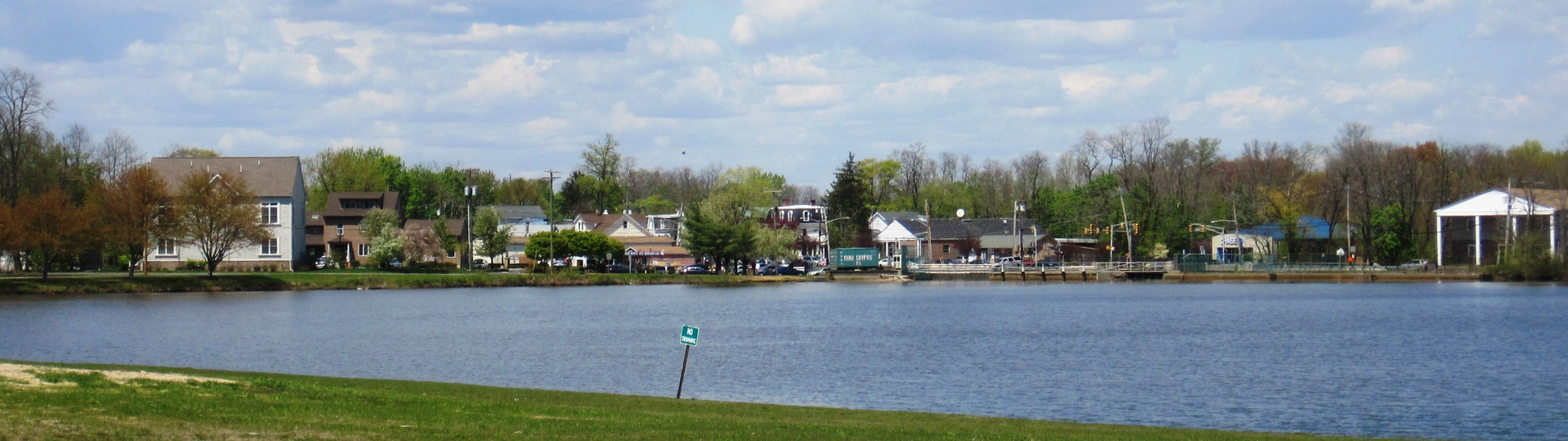
- Jamesburg as seen across Lake Manalapan from Thompson County Park

- Seal

- Location of Jamesburg in Middlesex County highlighted in red (left). Inset map: Location of Middlesex County in New Jersey highlighted in orange (right).

- Location in Middlesex County Location in New Jersey Location in the United States
- Coordinates: 40.349038°N 74.440202°W
- Country: United States
- State: New Jersey
- County: Middlesex
- Incorporated: March 19, 1887
- Named for: James Buckelew

Government
  - Type: Borough
  - Body: Borough Council
  - Mayor: Thomas Emens (D, term ends December 31, 2027)
  - Council President: Thomas Goletz (D, term ends December 31, 2026)
  - Administrator: Michael Capabianco
  - Municipal clerk: Susan Boulogne

Area
  - Total: 0.89 sq mi (2.31 km^{2})
  - Land: 0.88 sq mi (2.29 km^{2})
  - Water: 0.0077 sq mi (0.02 km^{2}) 0.90%
  - Rank: 517th of 565 in state 24th of 25 in county
- Elevation: 85 ft (26 m)

Population (2020)
  - Total: 5,783
  - Estimate (2024): 5,869
  - Rank: 358th of 565 in state 23rd of 25 in county
  - Density: 6,556.7/sq mi (2,531.6/km^{2})
  - Rank: 80th of 565 in state 5th of 25 in county
- Time zone: UTC–05:00 (Eastern (EST))
  - Summer (DST): UTC–04:00 (Eastern (EDT))
- ZIP Code: 08831
- Area code: 732 exchanges 521,605 and 656
- FIPS code: 3402334890
- GNIS feature ID: 0885263
- Website: www.jamesburgborough.org

Jamesburg is a borough in Middlesex County, in the U.S. state of New Jersey. As of the 2020 United States census, the borough's population was 5,783, a decrease of 132 (−2.2%) from the 2010 census count of 5,915, which in turn reflected a decline of 110 (−1.8%) from the 6,025 counted in the 2000 census.

== History ==
Jamesburg was formed as a borough by an act of the New Jersey Legislature on March 19, 1887, when it was created from portions of Monroe Township, based on the results of a referendum held on March 15, 1887. Jamesburg's incorporation was confirmed on April 15, 1915.

The borough was named for James Buckelew, who established a mill that became the nucleus of what is now Jamesburg. After Monroe Township officials refused to admit an African-American student into one of its schools, Buckelew funded the construction of a school located at the corner of Church Street and Gatzmer Avenue that would be open to all children. The school was named in his honor and became the derivation of the borough's name.

On July 17, 2005, 7 to 8 inches (18 to 20 cm) of rain fell in Jamesburg, flooding areas on West Railroad Avenue, East Church Street, Pergola Avenue, Willow Street, Forsgate Drive, and Gatzmer Avenue. 75 to 100 families were evacuated from their homes and housed at the John F. Kennedy Elementary School.

== Geography ==
According to the United States Census Bureau, the borough had a total area of 0.89 square miles (2.31 km^{2}), including 0.88 square miles (2.29 km^{2}) of land and 0.01 square miles (0.02 km^{2}) of water (0.90%).

The borough is the older and more urban core area located in the center of and completely surrounded by Monroe Township, making it part of 21 pairs of "doughnut towns" in the state, where one municipality entirely surrounds another.

== Demographics ==
Historical population
Census	Pop.	Note	%±
1880	681		—
1890	887		30.2%
1900	1,063		19.8%
1910	2,075		95.2%
1920	2,053		−1.1%
1930	2,048		−0.2%
1940	2,128		3.9%
1950	2,307		8.4%
1960	2,853		23.7%
1970	4,584		60.7%
1980	4,114		−10.3%
1990	5,294		28.7%
2000	6,025		13.8%
2010	5,915		−1.8%
2020	5,783		−2.2%
2024 (est.)	5,869	▲	1.5%
Population sources: 1880–1890 1890–1920; 1890–1910 1910–1930; 1940–2000 2000; 2010 2020

=== 2020 census ===
As of the 2020 census, Jamesburg had a population of 5,783. The median age was 37.8 years. 22.2% of residents were under the age of 18 and 11.8% of residents were 65 years of age or older. For every 100 females there were 104.9 males, and for every 100 females age 18 and over there were 100.4 males age 18 and over.

100.0% of residents lived in urban areas, while 0.0% lived in rural areas.

There were 2,115 households in Jamesburg, of which 36.5% had children under the age of 18 living in them. Of all households, 46.4% were married-couple households, 19.9% were households with a male householder and no spouse or partner present, and 25.7% were households with a female householder and no spouse or partner present. About 24.4% of all households were made up of individuals and 8.3% had someone living alone who was 65 years of age or older.

There were 2,228 housing units, of which 5.1% were vacant. The homeowner vacancy rate was 1.4% and the rental vacancy rate was 5.3%.

Racial composition as of the 2020 census
Race	Number	Percent
White	3,269	56.5%
Black or African American	431	7.5%
American Indian and Alaska Native	60	1.0%
Asian	275	4.8%
Native Hawaiian and Other Pacific Islander	1	0.0%
Some other race	1,089	18.8%
Two or more races	658	11.4%
Hispanic or Latino (of any race)	1,843	31.9%

=== 2010 census ===
The 2010 United States census counted 5,915 people, 2,172 households, and 1,492 families in the borough. The population density was 6,741.8 per square mile (2,603.0/km^{2}). There were 2,267 housing units at an average density of 2,583.9 per square mile (997.6/km^{2}). The racial makeup was 73.90% (4,371) White, 8.84% (523) Black or African American, 0.85% (50) Native American, 4.53% (268) Asian, 0.00% (0) Pacific Islander, 9.42% (557) from other races, and 2.47% (146) from two or more races. Hispanic or Latino people of any race were 22.38% (1,324) of the population.

Of the 2,172 households, 36.0% had children under the age of 18; 51.0% were married couples living together; 12.3% had a female householder with no husband present and 31.3% were non-families. Of all households, 25.8% were made up of individuals and 7.1% had someone living alone who was 65 years of age or older. The average household size was 2.72 and the average family size was 3.26.

25.3% of the population were under the age of 18, 8.4% from 18 to 24, 31.7% from 25 to 44, 26.1% from 45 to 64, and 8.5% who were 65 years of age or older. The median age was 35.9 years. For every 100 females, the population had 102.2 males. For every 100 females ages 18 and older there were 100.7 males.

The Census Bureau's 2006–2010 American Community Survey showed that (in 2010 inflation-adjusted dollars) median household income was $52,169 (with a margin of error of +/− $10,781) and the median family income was $69,531 (+/− $13,862). Males had a median income of $49,615 (+/− $9,412) versus $50,164 (+/− $5,717) for females. The per capita income for the borough was $28,668 (+/− $3,584). About 4.9% of families and 8.1% of the population were below the poverty line, including 5.7% of those under age 18 and 8.8% of those age 65 or over.

=== 2000 census ===
As of the 2000 United States census there were 6,025 people, 2,176 households, and 1,551 families residing in the borough. The population density was 7,148.2 inhabitants per square mile (2,759.9/km^{2}). There were 2,240 housing units at an average density of 2,657.6 per square mile (1,026.1/km^{2}). The racial makeup of the borough was 82.82% White, 8.83% African American, 0.20% Native American, 2.22% Asian, 3.80% from other races, and 2.12% from two or more races. Hispanic or Latino people of any race were 10.06% of the population.

There were 2,176 households, out of which 35.4% had children under the age of 18 living with them, 54.7% were married couples living together, 12.1% had a female householder with no husband present, and 28.7% were non-families. 22.4% of all households were made up of individuals, and 6.9% had someone living alone who was 65 years of age or older. The average household size was 2.70 and the average family size was 3.18.

In the borough the population was spread out, with 24.6% under the age of 18, 7.5% from 18 to 24, 35.6% from 25 to 44, 21.5% from 45 to 64, and 10.7% who were 65 years of age or older. The median age was 35 years. For every 100 females, there were 95.0 males. For every 100 females age 18 and over, there were 92.7 males.

The median income for a household in the borough was $59,461, and the median income for a family was $67,887. Males had a median income of $45,019 versus $33,333 for females. The per capita income for the borough was $23,325. About 3.0% of families and 3.5% of the population were below the poverty line, including 5.1% of those under age 18 and 3.9% of those age 65 or over.

== Parks and recreation ==
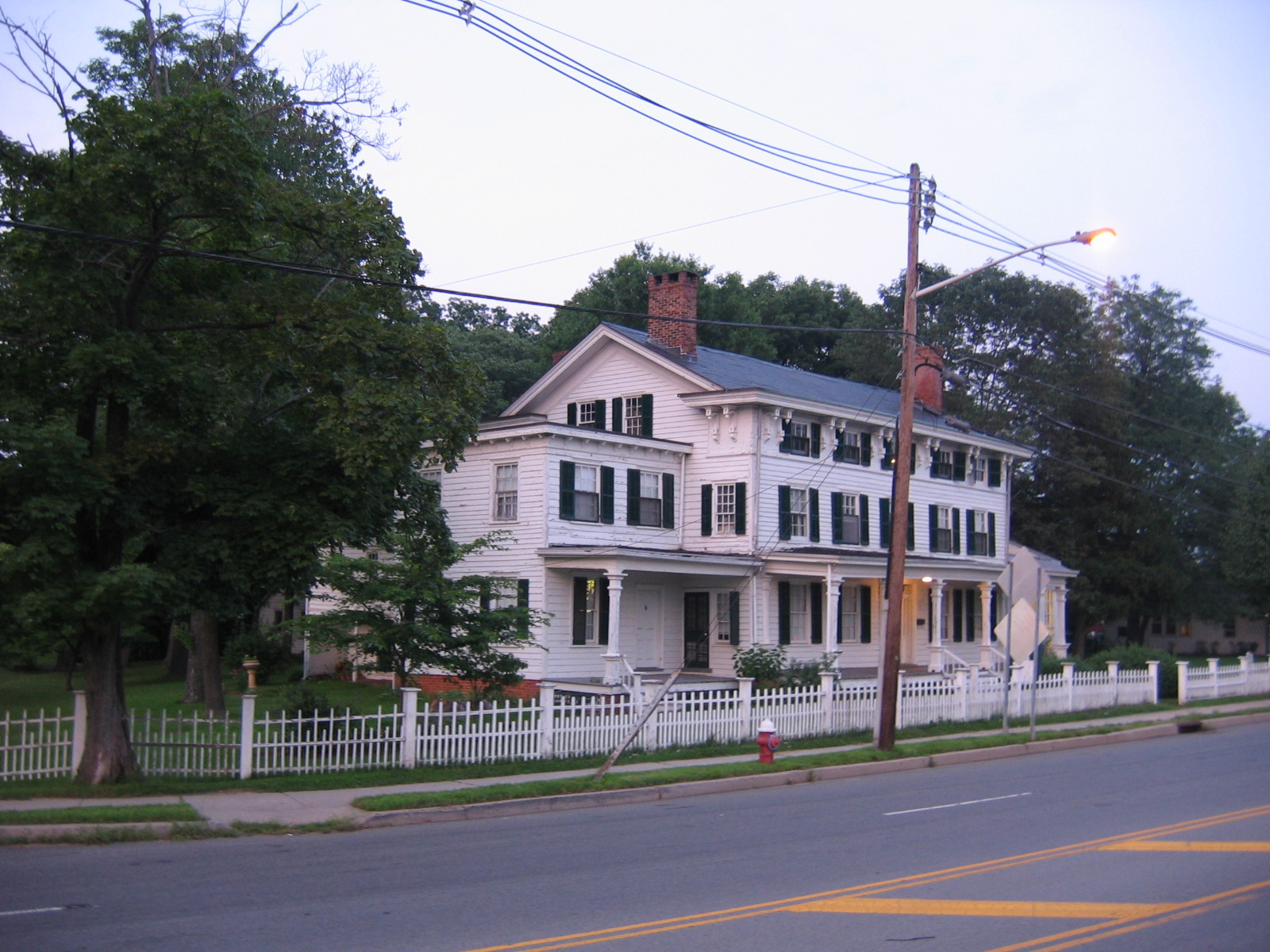
The historic Buckelew Mansion overlooks Lake Manalapan.

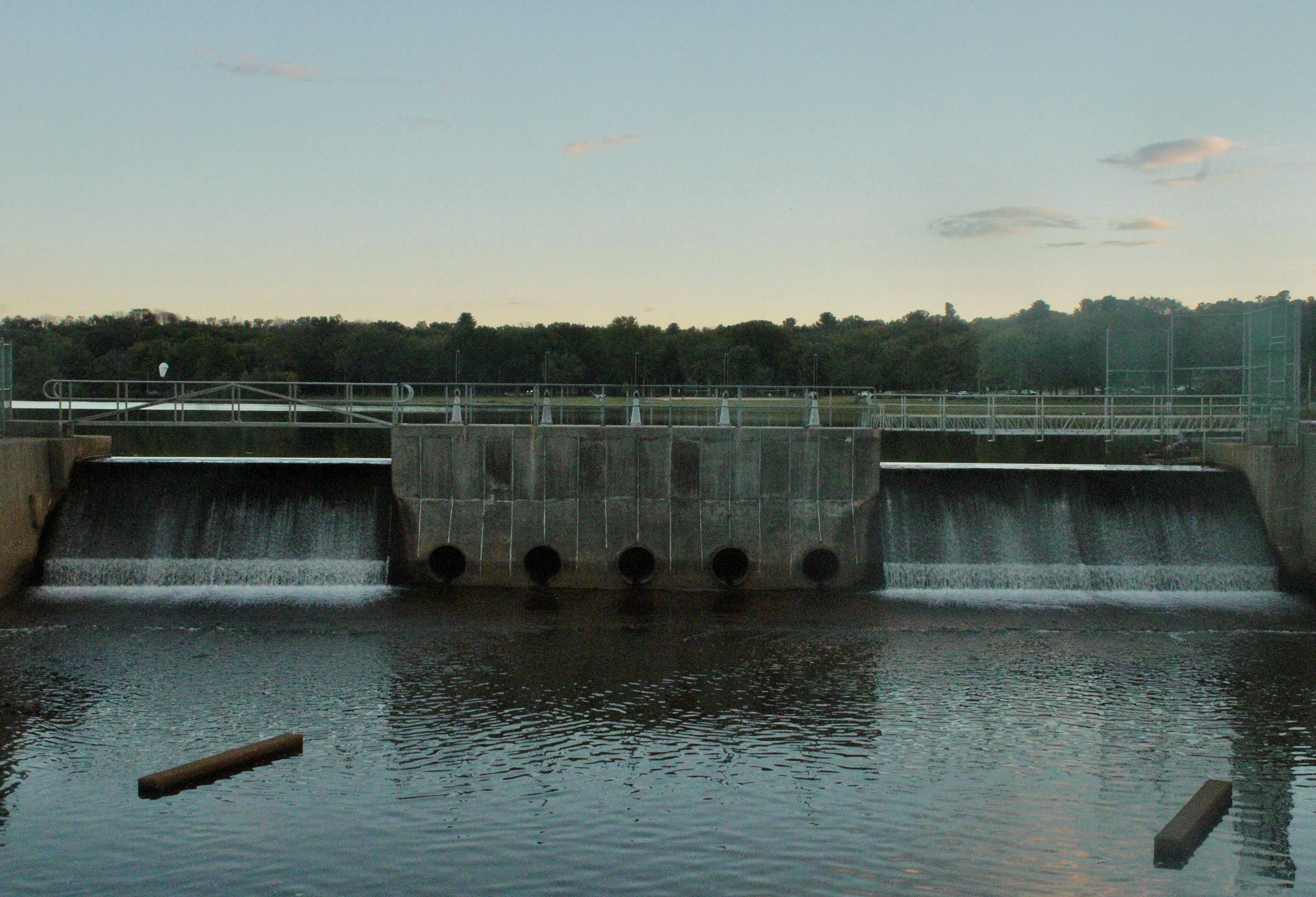
Waterfall stemming from a dam at Lake Manalapan in Jamesburg

Thompson Park, covering 675 acres (2.73 km^{2}), is located on the southwestern edge of Jamesburg and is also partially located in neighboring Monroe Township. The 30-acre (120,000 m^{2}) Manalapan Lake is located on the eastern edge of the park. The park has four tennis courts, four basketball courts, two handball courts, three baseball fields, a softball field, many soccer fields, multiple picnic groves equipped with grills, three hiking/biking trails, fishing, an animal haven, and a gazebo. The park has three entrances. Two are located on Perrineville Road, and one is located on Forsgate Drive. Monroe Township Soccer Club hosts a tournament every year on the soccer fields in the park.

== Government ==
=== Local government ===
Jamesburg is governed under the borough form of New Jersey municipal government, which is used in 218 municipalities (of the 564) statewide, making it the most common form of government in New Jersey. The governing body is comprised of the mayor and the borough council, with all positions elected at-large on a partisan basis as part of the November general election. A mayor is elected directly by the voters to a four-year term of office. The borough council includes six members elected to serve three-year terms on a staggered basis, with two seats coming up for election each year in a three-year cycle. The borough form of government used by Jamesburg is a "weak mayor / strong council" government in which council members act as the legislative body with the mayor presiding at meetings and voting only in the event of a tie. The mayor can veto ordinances subject to an override by a two-thirds majority vote of the council. The mayor makes committee and liaison assignments for council members, and most appointments are made by the mayor with the advice and consent of the council.

As of 2026, the mayor of the Borough of Jamesburg is Democrat Thomas Emens, whose term of office ends December 31, 2027. Members of the Borough Council are Council President Thomas Goletz (D, 2026), James Kozee (D, 2027), Bertin Lefkovic (R, 2026), Tracey Madigan (D, 2028), Samantha Rampacek (D, 2028) and Joseph Scillieri (R, 2027).

In December 2022, Thomas Goletz was appointed to fill the seat expiring in December 2023 that had been held by Daria Ludas until her death the previous month.

=== Federal, state and county representation ===
Jamesburg is located in the 12th Congressional District and is part of New Jersey's 14th state legislative district.

For the 119th United States Congress, New Jersey's 12th congressional district is represented by Bonnie Watson Coleman (D, Ewing Township). New Jersey is represented in the United States Senate by Democrats Cory Booker (Newark, term ends 2027) and Andy Kim (Moorestown, term ends 2031).

For the 2026–2027 session, the 14th legislative district of the New Jersey Legislature is represented in the State Senate by Linda R. Greenstein (D, Plainsboro Township) and in the General Assembly by Wayne DeAngelo (D, Hamilton Township) and Tennille McCoy (D, Hamilton Township).

Middlesex County is governed by a Board of County Commissioners, whose seven members are elected at-large on a partisan basis to serve three-year terms of office on a staggered basis, with either two or three seats coming up for election each year as part of the November general election. At an annual reorganization meeting held in January, the board selects from among its members a commissioner director and deputy director. As of 2025, Middlesex County's Commissioners (with party affiliation, term-end year, and residence listed in parentheses) are:

Director Ronald G. Rios (D, Carteret, 2027), Deputy Director Shanti Narra (D, North Brunswick, 2027), Claribel A. "Clary" Azcona-Barber (D, New Brunswick, 2025), Charles Kenny (D, Woodbridge Township, 2025), Leslie Koppel (D, Monroe Township, 2026), Chanelle Scott McCullum (D, Piscataway, 2025) and Charles E. Tomaro (D, Edison, 2026).

Constitutional officers are: Clerk Nancy Pinkin (D, 2025, East Brunswick), Sheriff Mildred S. Scott (D, 2025, Piscataway) and Surrogate Claribel Cortes (D, 2026; North Brunswick).

=== Politics ===
As of March 2011, there were a total of 2,996 registered voters in Jamesburg, of which 935 (31.2%) were registered as Democrats, 450 (15.0%) were registered as Republicans and 1,611 (53.8%) were registered as Unaffiliated. There were no voters registered to other parties.

United States presidential election results for Jamesburg
Year	Republican		Democratic		Third party(ies)	
Year	No.	%	No.	%	No.	%
2024	1,269	54.67%	1,014	43.69%	38	1.64%
2020	1,107	47.23%	1,200	51.19%	37	1.58%
2016	1,022	50.90%	909	45.27%	77	3.83%
2012	757	40.07%	1,103	58.39%	29	1.54%
2008	884	42.40%	1,172	56.21%	29	1.39%
2004	1,006	49.24%	1,017	49.78%	20	0.98%
2000	678	39.56%	966	56.36%	70	4.08%

In the 2016 presidential election, Republican Donald Trump received 50.9% of the vote (1,022 cast), ahead of Democrat Hillary Clinton, who received 45.3% of the vote (909 cast). In the 2012 presidential election, Democrat Barack Obama received 58.4% of the vote (1,103 cast), ahead of Republican Mitt Romney with 40.1% (757 votes), and other candidates with 1.5% (29 votes), among the 1,906 ballots cast by the borough's 2,998 registered voters (17 ballots were spoiled), for a turnout of 63.6%. In the 2008 presidential election, Democrat Barack Obama received 55.7% of the vote (1,172 cast), ahead of Republican John McCain with 42.0% (884 votes) and other candidates with 1.4% (29 votes), among the 2,104 ballots cast by the borough's 3,075 registered voters, for a turnout of 68.4%.

Gubernatorial election results for Jamesburg
Year	Republican		Democratic		Third party(ies)	
Year	No.	%	No.	%	No.	%
2025	860	48.07%	910	50.87%	19	1.06%
2021	637	53.66%	539	45.41%	11	0.93%
2017	548	50.51%	510	47.00%	27	2.49%
2013	762	63.87%	409	34.28%	22	1.84%
2009	752	55.21%	482	35.39%	128	9.40%
2005	620	48.40%	565	44.11%	96	7.49%

In the 2017 gubernatorial election, Republican Kim Guadagno received 50.5% of the vote (548 votes), ahead of Democrat Phil Murphy, who received 47.0% of the vote (510 votes). In the 2013 gubernatorial election, Republican Chris Christie received 63.9% of the vote (762 cast), ahead of Democrat Barbara Buono with 34.3% (409 votes), and other candidates with 1.8% (22 votes), among the 1,201 ballots cast by the borough's 3,010 registered voters (8 ballots were spoiled), for a turnout of 39.9%. In the 2009 gubernatorial election, Republican Chris Christie received 54.7% of the vote (752 ballots cast), ahead of Democrat Jon Corzine with 35.1% (482 votes), Independent Chris Daggett with 7.9% (108 votes) and other candidates with 1.5% (20 votes), among the 1,374 ballots cast by the borough's 2,952 registered voters, yielding a 46.5% turnout.

United States Senate election results for Jamesburg1
Year	Republican		Democratic		Third party(ies)	
Year	No.	%	No.	%	No.	%
2024	1,119	51.81%	977	45.23%	64	2.96%
2018	789	50.80%	704	45.33%	60	3.86%
2012	721	41.27%	991	56.73%	35	2.00%
2006	455	44.17%	529	51.36%	46	4.47%

United States Senate election results for Jamesburg2
Year	Republican		Democratic		Third party(ies)	
Year	No.	%	No.	%	No.	%
2020	1,017	44.59%	1,197	52.48%	67	2.94%
2014	411	44.97%	486	53.17%	17	1.86%
2013	320	50.63%	306	48.42%	6	0.95%
2008	863	44.88%	1,015	52.78%	45	2.34%

=== Scandal ===
In 1993–1994 there was a major state investigation into allegations of corruption by borough officials conducted by the New Jersey State Commission of Investigation. The Commission launched an investigation into the governmental operations of Jamesburg in February 1993 after receiving numerous citizen complaints of corruption at the hands of key municipal officials. In a November 1994 report, the commission revealed a systemic pattern of official misconduct, nepotism and abuse of the public trust so pervasive as to cause local budgetary hardships and jeopardize the local police department. The probe prompted the departure of longtime Borough Tax Assessor Carmen Pirre, spurred a Treasury Department audit, and paved the way for wholesale municipal reforms. Richard Gardiner, director of the state Division of Taxation, stated in a February 27, 1995 letter: "This case is a prime example of governmental agencies working in a cooperative and efficient manner to accomplish common goals and to achieve worthwhile objectives."

== Education ==
The Jamesburg Public Schools serves students in pre-kindergarten through eighth grade. As of the 2020–21 school year, the district, comprised of two schools, had an enrollment of 664 students and 64.8 classroom teachers (on an FTE basis), for a student–teacher ratio of 10.2:1. Schools in the district (with 2020–21 enrollment data from the National Center for Education Statistics) are John F. Kennedy Elementary School with 463 students in grades Pre-K–5 and Grace M. Breckwedel Middle School with 193 students in grades 6–8.

Jamesburg High School, founded in 1905, graduated its last class in June 1979. Since 1980, Jamesburg's high school students attend Monroe Township High School in Monroe Township, as part of a sending/receiving relationship with the Monroe Township School District. As of the 2020–21 school year, the high school had an enrollment of 2,474 students and 184.1 classroom teachers (on an FTE basis), for a student–teacher ratio of 13.4:1.

With annual tuition costs per student at Monroe Township High School rising past $16,000 as the Monroe district has added debt service costs into their tuition charges, the Jamesburg Public Schools looked for an alternate high school in the area to send students at lower cost, which would have started with the freshman class in 2012–2013, though students already enrolled at Monroe Township High School would continue their attendance there until they graduate. The Jamesburg district contacted 18 districts and received interest from high schools in the Freehold Regional High School District, Matawan-Aberdeen Regional School District, Old Bridge Township Public Schools, South Amboy Public Schools and the West Windsor-Plainsboro Regional School District, which had been sent demographic information in July 2011 about the Jamesburg high school population as part of their review process. By October 2011, the district decided to maintain sending students to Monroe Township, as had been done since 1979.

Eighth grade students from all of Middlesex County are eligible to apply to attend the high school programs offered by the Middlesex County Magnet Schools, a county-wide vocational school district that offers full-time career and technical education at its schools in East Brunswick, Edison, Perth Amboy, Piscataway and Woodbridge Township, with no tuition charged to students.

== Transportation ==
=== Roads and highways ===
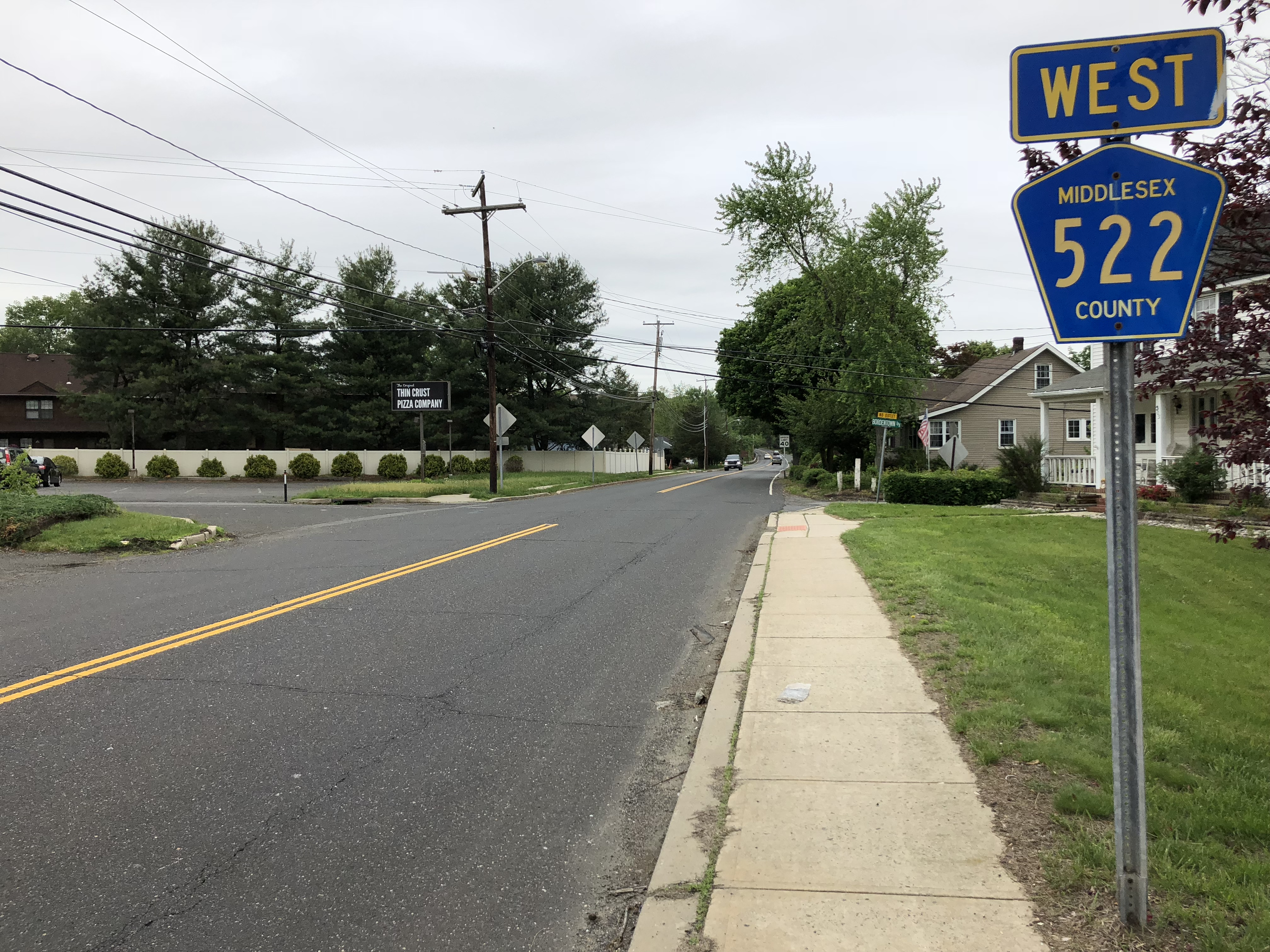
County Route 522 in Jamesburg

As of May 2010, the borough had a total of 16.53 miles (26.60 km) of roadways, of which 11.67 miles (18.78 km) were maintained by the municipality and 4.86 miles (7.82 km) by Middlesex County.

No Interstate, U.S. or state highways serve Jamesburg directly. The only major roads that pass through are county routes, including County Route 522, County Route 612, County Route 615 and County Route 625 (Perrineville Road).

The closest limited access road is the New Jersey Turnpike (Interstate 95) at Exit 8A in surrounding Monroe Township. Route 612 provides a connection between the Turnpike/Route 32 and County Route 520.

=== Public transportation ===
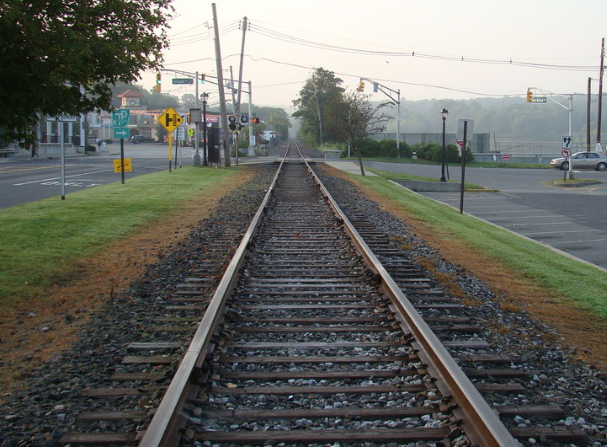
Freehold Secondary in Jamesburg in June 2017

In the 19th and 20th centuries, the Freehold and Jamesburg Agricultural Railroad was a major railway in the area of Jamesburg Borough and Monroe Township. This railway was owned and operated by the Camden & Amboy Railroad Company (C&A), in which surveying for the line began on September 8, 1851, grading began on October 19, 1852, and the first track was laid on April 4, 1853. The first section of line was opened on July 18, 1853. The establishment of the Freehold & Jamesburg Agricultural Railroad caused this region to become a transportation hub. The Freehold and Jamesburg Railroad was abandoned by the early 1930s. A 2.8-mile-long (4.5 km) portion of the former railroad's right-of-way was later approved to be sold by the New Jersey Board of Public Utility Commissioners to Jersey Central Power & Light Company in 1966, with occasional freight service still being utilized through the Freehold Industrial Track.

Middlesex County RIDE shuttles provide service on the M1 route operates between Jamesburg and the New Brunswick train station.

== Notable people ==
People who were born in, residents of, or otherwise closely associated with Jamesburg include:

- Harrison Woodhull Crosby (1814–1892), in 1847 became the first to can tomatoes
- Harold J. Davall (1879–1931), college football player and coach, engineer and railroad supervisor
- Reed Gusciora (born 1960), mayor of Trenton, New Jersey since 2018, who represented the 15th Legislative District in the General Assembly from 1996 to 2018
- Frankie Hayes (1914–1955), catcher in Major League Baseball from 1933 to 1947 who played for the Philadelphia Athletics for most of his career
- Tywone Malone Jr. (born 2003) American football defensive tackle for the Carolina Panthers of the National Football League
- George Edward Pendray (1901–1987), space flight proponent
- Thomas S. Timberman (1900–1989), United States Army major general
