= Applegarth =

Applegarth may refer to:

== People with the surname ==
- Adam Applegarth (born 1962), the chief executive officer of the Northern Rock Bank
- George Applegarth (1876–1972), American architect in the San Francisco Bay Area
- Mark Applegarth (born 1984), professional rugby league footballer
- Paul V. Applegarth (born 1946), American business executive and first CEO of the Millennium Challenge Corporation
- Peter Applegarth (born 1958), justice of the Supreme Court of Queensland
- Rufus Applegarth (1844–1921), American lawyer and politician, member of the Maryland House of Delegates
- Robert Applegarth (1834–1924), prominent British trade unionist
- Willie Applegarth (1890–1958), British athlete, winner of gold medal in 4 × 100 m relay at the 1912 Summer Olympics

== Places ==
In Scotland

- Applegarth, Dumfries and Galloway

In England

- Applegarth, North Yorkshire

In the United States

- Applegarth, New Jersey
