= Forsgate Country Club =

Country club in Monroe Township, New Jersey

Coordinates: 40.3440°N 74.4601°W

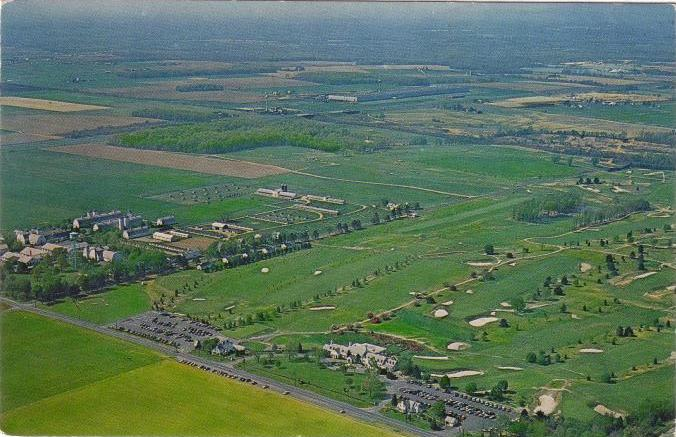
- Aerial view of Forsgate Country Club
- Interactive map of Forsgate Country Club

Club information
- Location: Monroe, New Jersey, U.S.
- Established: 1931
- Owner: Metropolitan Golf Group
- Operator: Metropolitan Golf Group
- Tota holes: 36
- Tournaments: Forsgate Foundation Charity Classic
- Website: http://www.forsgatecc.com

Banks Course
- Designed by: Charles Banks
- Par: 71
- Length: 6,932 yards
- Course rating: 73.4/138

Palmer Course
- Designed by: Hal Purdy & Others
- Par: 72
- Length: 6,737 yards
- Course rating: 72.0/138

Forsgate Country Club is a country club located in Monroe Township, New Jersey. The club has two distinctively different eighteen hole golf courses, an historic clubhouse with two dining facilities, tennis court, a pool and fitness center. The club is private for golf and dining, but is available to non-members for meetings, catering, and golf outings. The club and its associated housing developments comprise the Forsgate census-designated place.

== Banks Course ==
The Banks Course was created by Charles “Steamshovel” Banks in 1931.

== Banks Course Featured Hole 12 ==
This Horseshoe completely surrounded by bunkers, this par three is a copy of many elevated short holes in Scotland. "Buried elephants" is one way to describe the horseshoe-shaped undulation.

== Palmer Course ==
Originally created by Hal Purdy in 1961, but redesigned in 1995 by the Arnold Palmer Group and again in 2007 by Steven Kay.
