= Holmes–Tallman House =

- U.S. National Register of Historic Places
- New Jersey Register of Historic Places
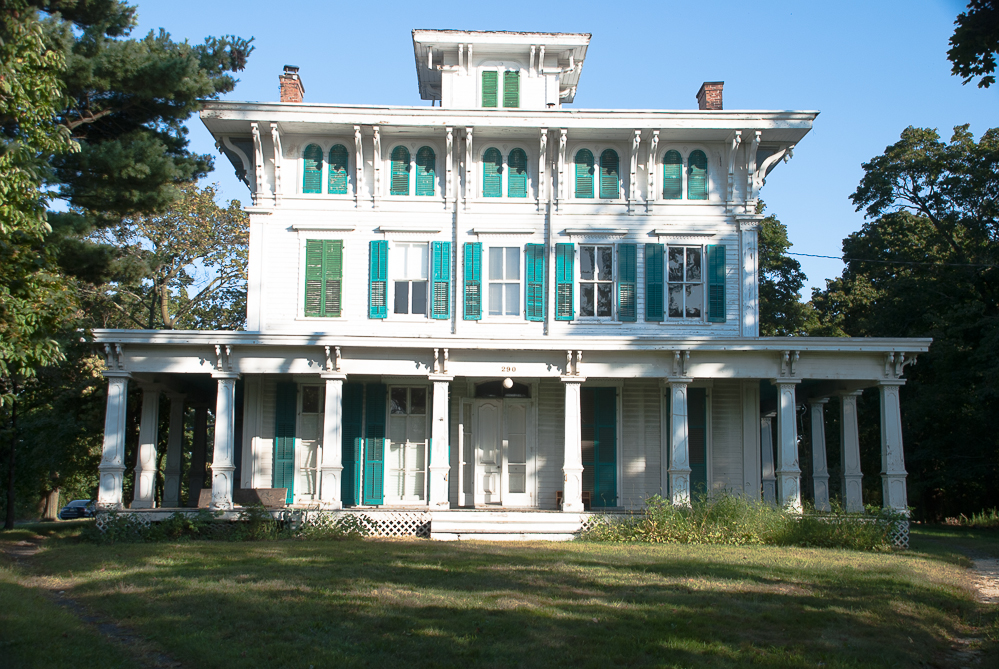

- Location within Middlesex County, New Jersey Location within New Jersey Location within the United States
- Location: Corner of Cranbury-South River Road and Brown's Corner Road; Monroe Township, New Jersey
- Nearest city: Jamesburg, New Jersey
- Coordinates: 40°22′15″N 74°27′30″W
- Area: 26 acres (11 ha)
- Built: 1860
- Architectural style: Italianate, "Carpenter's Italianate"
- Demolished: March 10, 2025
- NRHP reference No.: 79001508
- NJRHP No.: 1851

Significant dates
- Added to NRHP: September 12, 1979
- Designated NJRHP: July 5, 1979

The Holmes–Tallman House was a large farmhouse with Carpenter's Italianate style located northwest of Jamesburg, at the corner of County Route 535 (Cranbury-South River Road) and County Route 522 (Rhode Hall Road, formerly Brown's Corner Road), in Monroe Township, Middlesex County, New Jersey. Also known as Brown's Corner House, it was added to the National Register of Historic Places on September 12, 1979, for its significance in architecture. It was demolished on March 10, 2025.

== Description ==
Built of wood, the Holmes–Tallman House features a three-story cubical main section with a two-story wing in the back; a one-story porch with eyelet jigsaw work spans the front and sides. Otherwise known as cubical Italianate architecture, the general design was popular in farming contexts. It has also sometimes been described as a Victorian mansion. A parlor runs the full depth of the house. The hip roof has a square cupola. A large kitchen was added to the rear of the house in 1870, in what would be the only structural addition the house would ever see; as such, the house found appreciation for having almost all of its original design characteristics still in place. The structure consists of twenty-two rooms overall, and has been measured at some 5,000 square feet (460 m^{2}).

== History ==
The house was built c. 1860 by Francis Holmes, whose money came from agriculture. It was then purchased on September 10, 1870, by Jacob B. Tallman. He owned an investment firm in New York and built the structure as a summer house. What the original acreage was is unclear.

The road the structure was on has had several names over time, such as Jamesburg-Dayton Road; subsequently the house would have the address 290 Rhode Hall Road. The house tended to overlook corn fields.

By the 1970s, the house was owned by George and Gwen Baker. She was the great-granddaughter of Tallman, and the granddaughter of Minnie Tallman, who had lived there as well. Gwen Baker had lived in the house her entire life, and overall, six generations of the family before and after her lived in the house.

The Holmes–Tallman House was added to the New Jersey Register of Historic Places in 1979, with a staffer for the New Jersey Department of Environmental Protection calling it an "outstanding example of a large square carpenter's Italianate farmhouse." Later that year, it was added to the National Register of Historic Places. This would qualify the owners for a restoration grant if they were to open the house to visitors, but the Bakers told The Home News that they had no plan to do so. In any case, the house was well-preserved and in good operating condition, a state of affairs which continued into the 1980s. During this period, the house had twelve bedrooms, of which nine were furnished and three were used for storage. The domicile was full of antique furniture, family portraits, and other heirlooms of various sorts. The house was on a 26-acre (11 ha) plot of land.

By the late 1990s, the house was owned by George and Gwen Baker's son, Howe Baker, and his wife, Susan Schneider-Baker. Schneider-Baker appreciated the history and legacy of the house, but also commented about how expensive it was to keep up and time-consuming it was to clean.

The acres the house was on was given preliminary approval in 2000 for inclusion in a farmland preservation program run by the State of New Jersey, but it is unclear what became of that. By 2008, more pieces of the land had been sold off for various kinds of development, such that only 6 acres (2.4 ha) remained. The roads the house was on kept getting busier, as the nearby area saw the growing presence of warehouses and tract housing construction. There was constant noise from trucks going by the house as well as from the nearby New Jersey Turnpike.

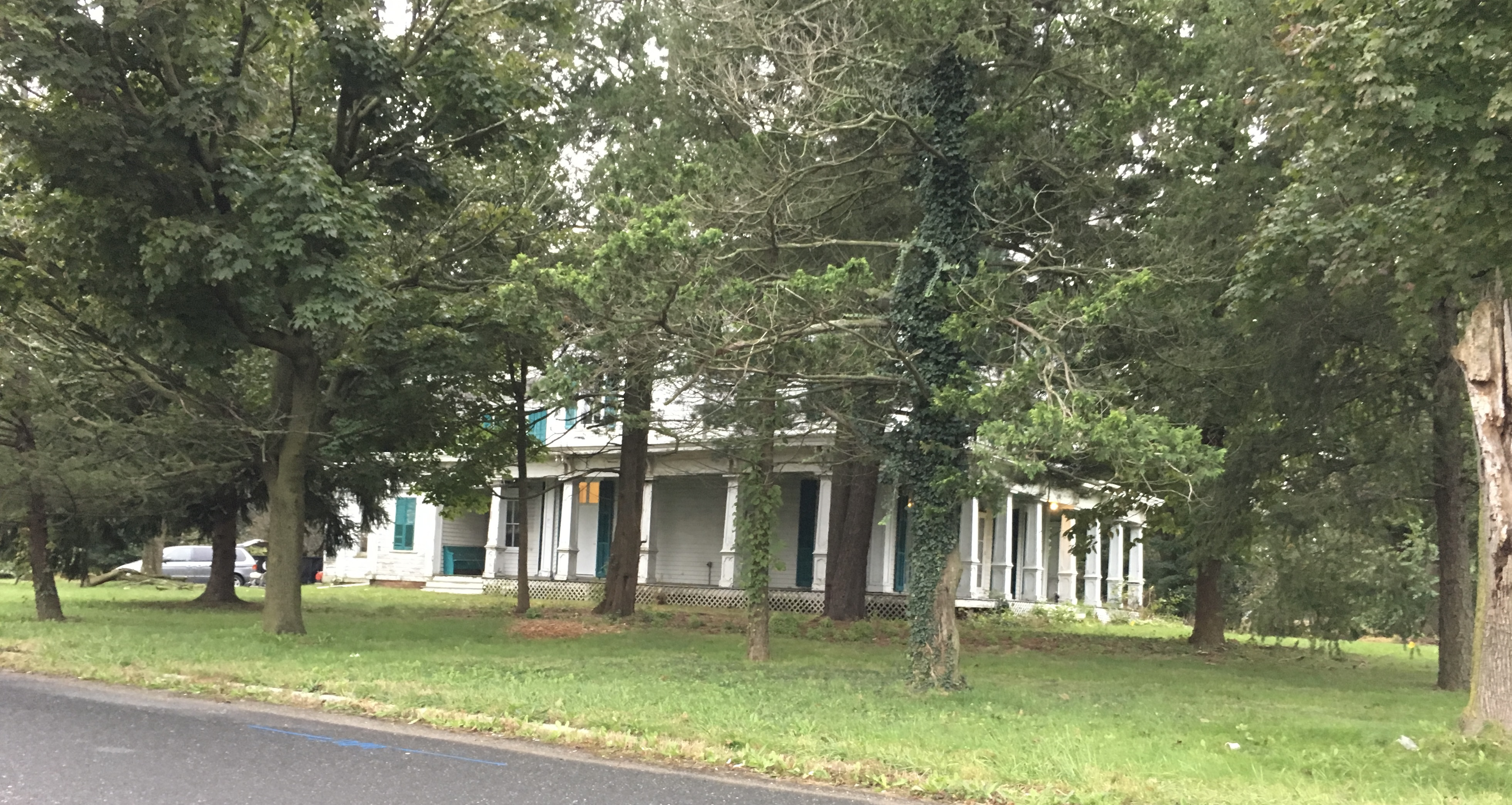
Activity at the house in 2018

The house with its lot was put up for sale in 2008, with an asking price of $1.8 million. In addition to the typical rooms in a domicile, the house contained what were now considered two parlors, as well as a library, a conservatory, an office, rooms for maids or au pairs, and antechambers, as well as the cupola. Schneider-Baker said to the Courier News that she did not like the encroaching development but did not see the use in trying to fight it.

In any case, the house did not sell, and in 2013 its price was reduced by the Baker family to $799,000. The nearby road traffic had only gotten worse, and the vibrations from it had taken their toll on the house's plasterwork and foundation. There was a tentative contract to sell the property to a religious organization that was building a large structure across Rhode Hall Road, with the house to be torn down and the land to be used as an overflow parking lot. It is not clear if this contract went through, or some other one did. At some point, the building saw some use as a rental property, before it became unoccupied and suffered from ongoing deterioration.

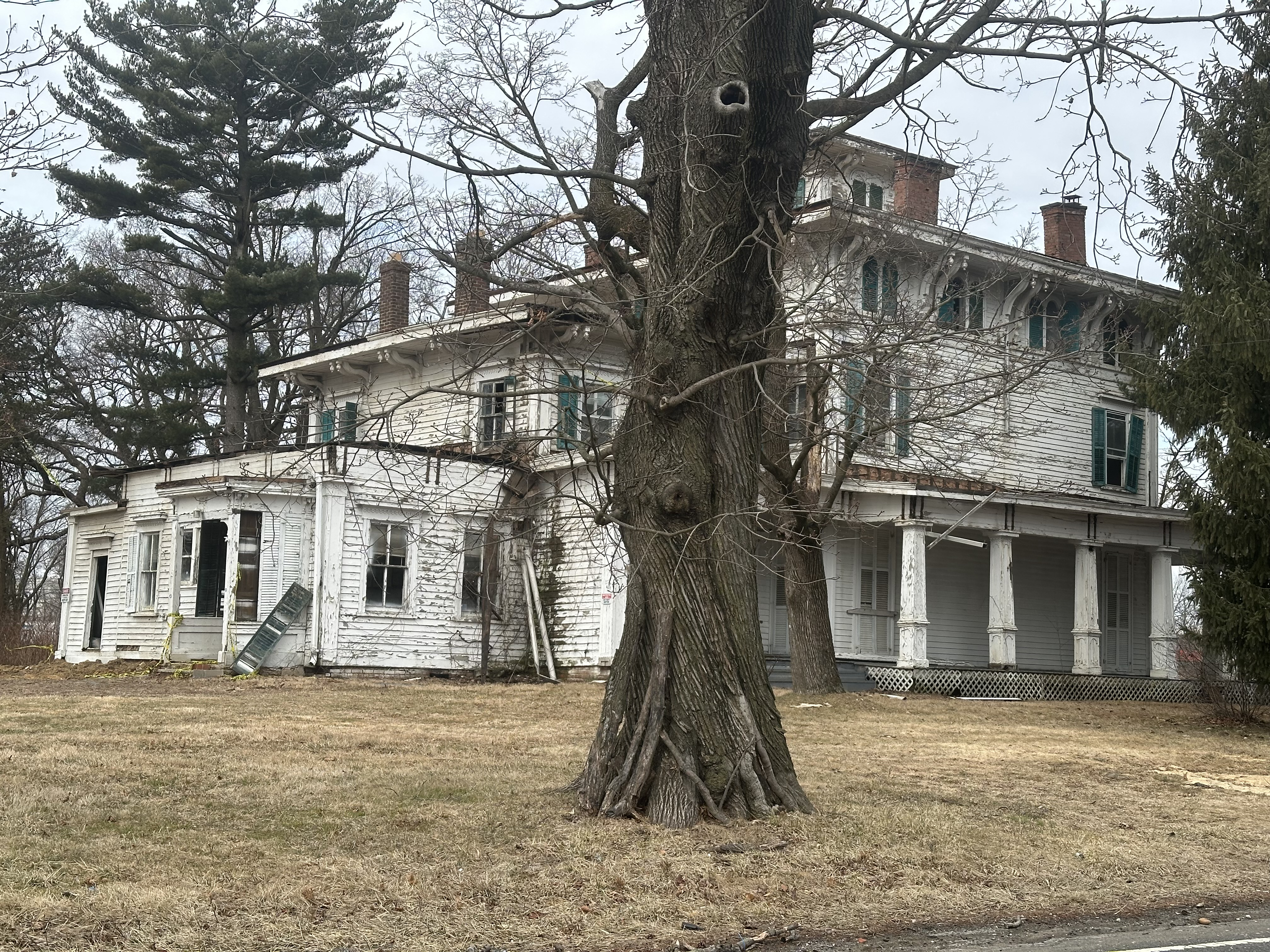
The house in 2025, a few days before it was torn down

Ideas were proposed for how to renovate and preserve the house, but the process would have been expensive, with estimates ranging into the millions of dollars. Monroe Township officials said they did not have the resources to attempt to save it, but they did cooperate with the Baker family to get artifacts from the house donated to the town's preservation committee.

In the end, the house experienced demolition on March 10, 2025. The Monroe Township Historic Preservation Commission acknowledged the loss, but stated that "Although recognized for its historical and architectural importance, the Holmes-Tallman House stood on privately owned land, and decisions regarding its future ultimately remained at the discretion of the property owner(s)." It is unclear who these owners were at this point. There were some plans to show exhibits about the house at the Dey Farm Historic Site in the Old Church part of the township. A writer for Century Homes America said that the house's fate was a "decision [that] prioritized warehouses over heritage".

== See also ==
- National Register of Historic Places listings in Middlesex County, New Jersey
