= Rossmoor, New Jersey =

Populated place in Middlesex County, New Jersey, US

- Census-designated place
- Map of Rossmoor highlighted within Middlesex County. Right: Location of Middlesex County in New Jersey.

- Location in Middlesex County Location in New Jersey Location in the United States
- Coordinates: 40.332747°N 74.472422°W
- Country: United States
- State: New Jersey
- County: Middlesex
- Township: Monroe

Area
  - Total: 0.68 sq mi (1.77 km^{2})
  - Land: 0.68 sq mi (1.75 km^{2})
  - Water: 0.0077 sq mi (0.02 km^{2}) 1.48%
- Elevation: 130 ft (40 m)

Population (2020)
  - Total: 2,992
  - Density: 4,435.7/sq mi (1,712.63/km^{2})
- Time zone: UTC−05:00 (Eastern (EST))
  - Summer (DST): UTC−04:00 (Eastern (EDT))
- ZIP Code: 08831 (Monroe Township)
- Area code: 609
- FIPS code: 34-64865
- GNIS feature ID: 02389783

Rossmoor is an unincorporated community and census-designated place (CDP) in Monroe Township, Middlesex County, New Jersey, United States. As of the 2020 census, the CDP's population was 2,992, up from 2,666 in 2010.

Rossmoor is a gated age-restricted co-op, active adult community. Rossmoor covers 418 acres (1.69 km^{2}) just off Exit 8A of the New Jersey Turnpike (Interstate 95). It has 2,303 residences, encircling a 104-acre (0.42 km^{2}) championship golf course. The community offers a wide selection of living space, from smaller units of 500 sq ft (46 m^{2}), to larger units with 2,300 sq ft (210 m^{2}) of living space, with its architecture primarily being American Colonial in style. Many residents continue to work in the area or commute to New York City. Express buses stop at Rossmoor for the 55-minute ride to the Port Authority Bus Terminal on 42nd Street in Midtown Manhattan.

== History ==
The concept of a "Senior Community" was an unknown entity in the building trade of the early 1960s. But a man from California had already begun to change that by building three successful “Senior Communities” in Southern California. And then – in 1963 - this 47 year old builder was about to repeat his California success in New Jersey on the east coast. That person was Ross Cortese who started our community and after whom it is named. Through his contacts and research in 1962–63, Ross Cortese identified an area in central New Jersey that seemed to have all the right factors. He purchase available farm land directly adjacent to the New Jersey Turnpike (whose initial 118 miles had just been built between 1950 and 1952.) The land was near a large Country Club (the Forsgate Club), in business since 1931, which had already been successful in attracting a good clientele and which might also be available for purchase. He made sure to offer amenities that would attract buyers, and then he marketed the concept to the surrounding public.

In 1963, Arthur Phillips, Esq., then a young lawyer with offices in the Heritage Building near what is now Rossmoor's North Gate, was hired by Cortese to act as attorney for the purchase of the necessary acreage. The purchase was a huge tract of land, covering the area that now includes today's Adult Communities of Clearbrook, Concordia, Encore, the Ponds, Whittingham and all the Forsgate land including the Forsgate Country Club. Each Village was to have its own clubhouse and golf course. Total cost was expected to be $500 million. On May 8, 1964, the plans for the property were made public. The work on Village #1 began in earnest soon afterwards, and the Farmland appearance of Monroe changed abruptly. The last 6 months of 1966 was when construction began in earnest.

Over a 25-year period Rossmoor Village One was built out. As each section was completed a new sub association was established. Today there are 18 sub-associations called Mutuals in Village One (now known as Rossmoor). Rossmoor is overseen by a master association Board of Governors made up of each Mutual's presidents. Together they assure the care and operation of the communities infrastructure and amenities and provide needed administrative and maintenance services to each Mutual and thus every owner.

Although only one of the original five villages were ever developed by Mr. Cortese's company the spirit of his plan did eventually come to fruition through the construction of multiple active adult communities on the original land. His idea expanded even further into Monroe Township providing more and more affordable adult active housing options.

== Geography ==
Rossmoor is in southern Middlesex County, along the western edge of Monroe Township. It is bordered to the north by Forsgate and to the west by Cranbury Township. The New Jersey Turnpike passes just west of the community's border, with Exit 8A at the community's northwestern corner. New Brunswick, the Middlesex county seat, is 10 miles (16 km) to the north, and Newark is 33 miles (53 km) to the north, while Trenton is 21 miles (34 km) to the southwest.

According to the U.S. Census Bureau, the Rossmoor CDP has a total area of 0.68 square miles (1.76 km^{2}), of which 0.01 square miles (0.03 km^{2}), or 1.46%, are water. The community is on flat terrain which drains west toward Shallow Brook, a west-flowing tributary of Devils Brook and part of the Millstone River watershed.

== Demographics ==
Historical population
Census	Pop.	Note	%±
1990	3,231		—
2000	3,129		−3.2%
2010	2,666		−14.8%
2020	2,992		12.2%
Population sources: 1950 1960 1970; 1980 1990 2000; 2010 2020

Rossmoor first appeared as a census designated place in the 1990 U.S. census.

=== Racial and ethnic composition ===
Rossmoor CDP, New Jersey – Racial and ethnic composition Note: the US Census treats Hispanic/Latino as an ethnic category. This table excludes Latinos from the racial categories and assigns them to a separate category. Hispanics/Latinos may be of any race.
Race / Ethnicity (NH = Non-Hispanic)	Pop 2000	Pop 2010	Pop 2020	% 2000	% 2010	% 2020
White alone (NH)	3,050	2,445	2,343	97.48%	91.71%	78.31%
Black or African American alone (NH)	30	113	181	0.96%	4.24%	6.05%
Native American or Alaska Native alone (NH)	3	2	7	0.10%	0.08%	0.23%
Asian alone (NH)	16	26	239	0.51%	0.98%	7.99%
Native Hawaiian or Pacific Islander alone (NH)	0	0	0	0.00%	0.00%	0.00%
Other race alone (NH)	1	0	4	0.03%	0.00%	0.13%
Mixed race or Multiracial (NH)	13	10	39	0.42%	0.38%	1.30%
Hispanic or Latino (any race)	16	70	179	0.51%	2.63%	5.98%
Total	3,129	2,666	2,992	100.00%	100.00%	100.00%

=== 2020 census ===
As of the 2020 census, Rossmoor had a population of 2,992. The median age was 72.7 years. 0.6% of residents were under the age of 18 and 76.7% of residents were 65 years of age or older. For every 100 females there were 58.1 males, and for every 100 females age 18 and over there were 57.7 males age 18 and over.

100.0% of residents lived in urban areas, while 0.0% lived in rural areas.

There were 2,127 households in Rossmoor, of which 1.5% had children under the age of 18 living in them. Of all households, 28.3% were married-couple households, 16.2% were households with a male householder and no spouse or partner present, and 52.0% were households with a female householder and no spouse or partner present. About 61.4% of all households were made up of individuals and 51.7% had someone living alone who was 65 years of age or older.

There were 2,333 housing units, of which 8.8% were vacant. The homeowner vacancy rate was 2.4% and the rental vacancy rate was 1.8%.

=== 2010 census ===
The 2010 United States census counted 2,666 people, 1,966 households, and 617 families in the CDP. The population density was 2,947.6 people per square mile (1,138.1 people/km^{2}). There were 2,257 housing units at an average density of 2,495.4 units per square mile (963.5 units/km^{2}). The racial makeup was 93.96% (2,505) White, 4.31% (115) Black or African American, 0.08% (2) Native American, 1.01% (27) Asian, 0.00% (0) Pacific Islander, 0.15% (4) from other races, and 0.49% (13) from two or more races. Hispanic or Latino of any race were 2.63% (70) of the population.

Of the 1,966 households, 0.0% had children under the age of 18; 27.3% were married couples living together; 3.5% had a female householder with no husband present and 68.6% were non-families. Of all households, 65.5% were made up of individuals and 57.6% had someone living alone who was 65 years of age or older. The average household size was 1.36 and the average family size was 2.03.

0.0% of the population were under the age of 18, 0.1% from 18 to 24, 0.8% from 25 to 44, 16.4% from 45 to 64, and 82.7% who were 65 years of age or older. The median age was 77.9 years. For every 100 females, the population had 50.6 males. For every 100 females ages 18 and older there were 50.6 males.

=== 2000 census ===
As of the 2000 United States census there were 3,129 people, 2,131 households, and 790 families living in the CDP. The population density was 1,342.3 people/km^{2} (3,477 people/mi^{2}). There were 2,345 housing units at an average density of 1,006.0 units/km^{2} (2,606 units/mi^{2}). The racial makeup of the CDP was 97.95% White, 0.96% African American, 0.10% Native American, 0.51% Asian, 0.06% from other races, and 0.42% from two or more races. Hispanic or Latino of any race were 0.51% of the population.

There were 2,131 households, out of which none had children under the age of 18 living with them, 33.8% were married couples living together, 2.6% had a female householder with no husband present, and 62.9% were non-families. 61.1% of all households were made up of individuals, and 56.4% had someone living alone who was 65 years of age or older. The average household size was 1.40 and the average family size was 2.03.

In the CDP the population was spread out, with 0.1% under the age of 18, 0.1% from 18 to 24, 0.6% from 25 to 44, 9.8% from 45 to 64, and 89.5% who were 65 years of age or older. The median age was 77 years. For every 100 females, there were 50.1 males. For every 100 females age 18 and over, there were 50.1 males.

The median income for a household in the CDP was $33,104, and the median income for a family was $41,847. Males had a median income of $65,385 versus $38,750 for females. The per capita income for the CDP was $31,178. About 1.1% of families and 4.3% of the population were below the poverty line, including none of those under age 18 and 3.1% of those age 65 or over.
