= Hoffman, New Jersey =

Populated place in Middlesex County, New Jersey, US

- Unincorporated community
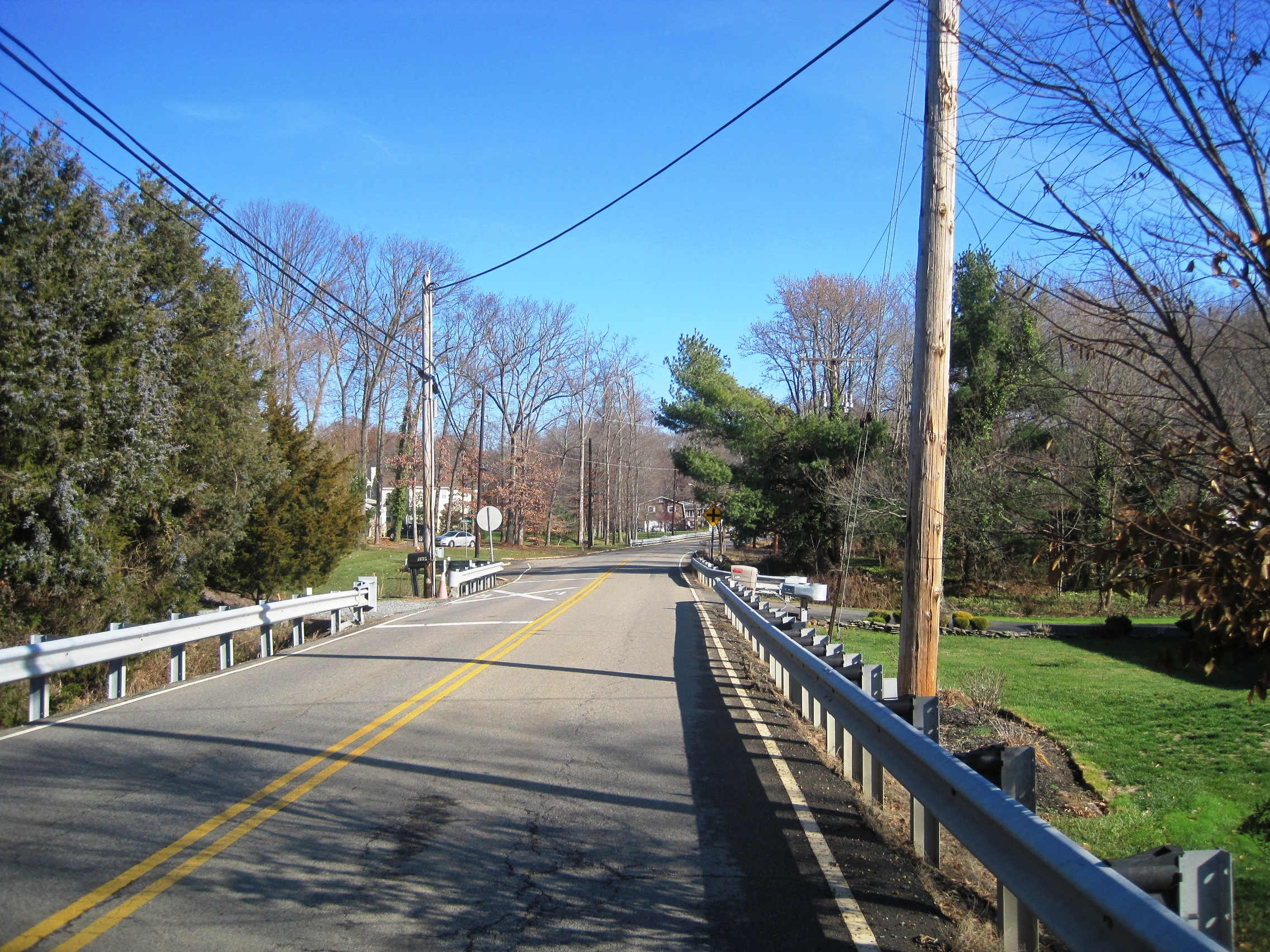
- Along Hoffman Station Road (CR 614)

- Location within Middlesex County, New Jersey Location within New Jersey Location within the United States
- Coordinates: 40°19′04″N 74°24′43″W
- Country: United States
- State: New Jersey
- County: Middlesex
- Township: Monroe
- Elevation: 79 ft (24 m)
- GNIS feature ID: 877151

Hoffman (also known as Hoffman Station) is an unincorporated community located within Monroe Township in Middlesex County, in the U.S. state of New Jersey. The settlement is located at the site of a former railroad station on the Freehold and Jamesburg Agricultural Railroad. Today, most of the area is made up of homes and housing developments along Hoffman Station Road (County Route 614) and Gravel Hill-Spotswood Road. Forestland and the Manalapan Brook valley make up the remainder of the area.
