= Regency at Monroe, New Jersey =

Populated place in Middlesex County, New Jersey, US

Regency at Monroe
- Census-designated place
- Location in Middlesex County Location in New Jersey Location in the United States
- Coordinates: 40°19′16″N 74°23′9″W
- Country: United States
- State: New Jersey
- County: Middlesex
- Township: Monroe

Area
  - Total: 0.73 sq mi (1.88 km^{2})
  - Land: 0.73 sq mi (1.88 km^{2})
  - Water: 0 sq mi (0.00 km^{2})
- Elevation: 128 ft (39 m)

Population (2020)
  - Total: 2,036
  - Density: 2,807.9/sq mi (1,084.12/km^{2})
- Time zone: UTC−05:00 (Eastern (EST))
  - Summer (DST): UTC−04:00 (EDT)
- ZIP Code: 08831 (Monroe Township)
- Area codes: 732/848
- FIPS code: 34-62585
- GNIS feature ID: 2806176

Regency at Monroe is a gated community and census-designated place (CDP) in Monroe Township, Middlesex County, New Jersey, United States. It was first listed as a CDP in the 2020 census, with a population of 2,036.

== Geography ==
The community is in southern Middlesex County, in the eastern part of Monroe Township. It is bordered by Mounts Mills Road to the north, Spotswood-Englishtown Road to the east, and Buckelew Avenue to the southwest. It is 7 miles (11 km) northwest of Freehold, 15 miles (24 km) south-southeast of New Brunswick, and 22 miles (35 km) northeast of Trenton.

According to the U.S. Census Bureau, the CDP has an area of 0.725 square miles (1.878 km^{2}), all land. The community sits on a low hill which drains north toward Matchaponix Brook, a north-flowing tributary of the South River and part of the Raritan River watershed.

== Demographics ==
Historical population
Census	Pop.	Note	%±
2020	2,036		—
U.S. Decennial Census; 2020

Regency at Monroe first appeared as a census designated place in the 2020 U.S. census.

=== 2020 census ===
As of the 2020 census, Regency at Monroe had a population of 2,036. The median age was 72.1 years. 1.8% of residents were under the age of 18 and 80.7% of residents were 65 years of age or older. For every 100 females there were 87.5 males, and for every 100 females age 18 and over there were 86.0 males age 18 and over.

100.0% of residents lived in urban areas, while 0.0% lived in rural areas.

There were 1,099 households in Regency at Monroe, of which 4.9% had children under the age of 18 living in them. Of all households, 72.6% were married-couple households, 6.4% were households with a male householder and no spouse or partner present, and 17.8% were households with a female householder and no spouse or partner present. About 19.0% of all households were made up of individuals and 16.4% had someone living alone who was 65 years of age or older.

There were 1,207 housing units, of which 8.9% were vacant. The homeowner vacancy rate was 1.4% and the rental vacancy rate was 0.0%.

Regency at Monroe CDP, New Jersey – Racial and ethnic composition Note: the US Census treats Hispanic/Latino as an ethnic category. This table excludes Latinos from the racial categories and assigns them to a separate category. Hispanics/Latinos may be of any race.
Race / Ethnicity (NH = Non-Hispanic)	Pop 2020	% 2020
White alone (NH)	1,840	90.37%
Black or African American alone (NH)	19	0.93%
Native American or Alaska Native alone (NH)	0	0.00%
Asian alone (NH)	121	5.94%
Native Hawaiian or Pacific Islander alone (NH)	0	0.00%
Other race alone (NH)	2	0.10%
Mixed race or Multiracial (NH)	12	0.59%
Hispanic or Latino (any race)	42	2.06%
Total	2,036	100.00%
