= New Jersey Juvenile Justice Commission =

American state government agency

The New Jersey Juvenile Justice Commission is a state agency of New Jersey, headquartered in Ewing Township, near Trenton. The commission, under the office of the Attorney General of New Jersey, provides youth correctional services.

== Facilities ==
The New Jersey Training School, the JJC's largest facility, houses around 300 boys. It is in Monroe Township, Middlesex County.

The state's other secure facilities are located in the Johnstone Campus in Bordentown. All adjudicated girls go to the Johnstone Campus Juvenile Female Secure Care and Intake Facility, which has a capacity for 52 inmates. There are detention cells which may hold up to 8 girls. Normally the entire girls' area may house up to 48 girls. Boys go to Juvenile Medium Security Facility-North Compound (JMSF-N) and the Juvenile Medium Security Facility-South Compound (JMSF-S); these two parts altogether may house up to 262 inmates. As of 2015 about 118 boys live in the medium compound.

In 1996 the state opened a boot camp for juvenile offenders. The commission did a study which concluded that of the males who went to the boot camp between February 1997 and August 1999, within a two-year period of completing the program 80% had later been arrested.
