= Prospect Plains, New Jersey =

Populated place in Middlesex County, New Jersey, US

- Unincorporated community
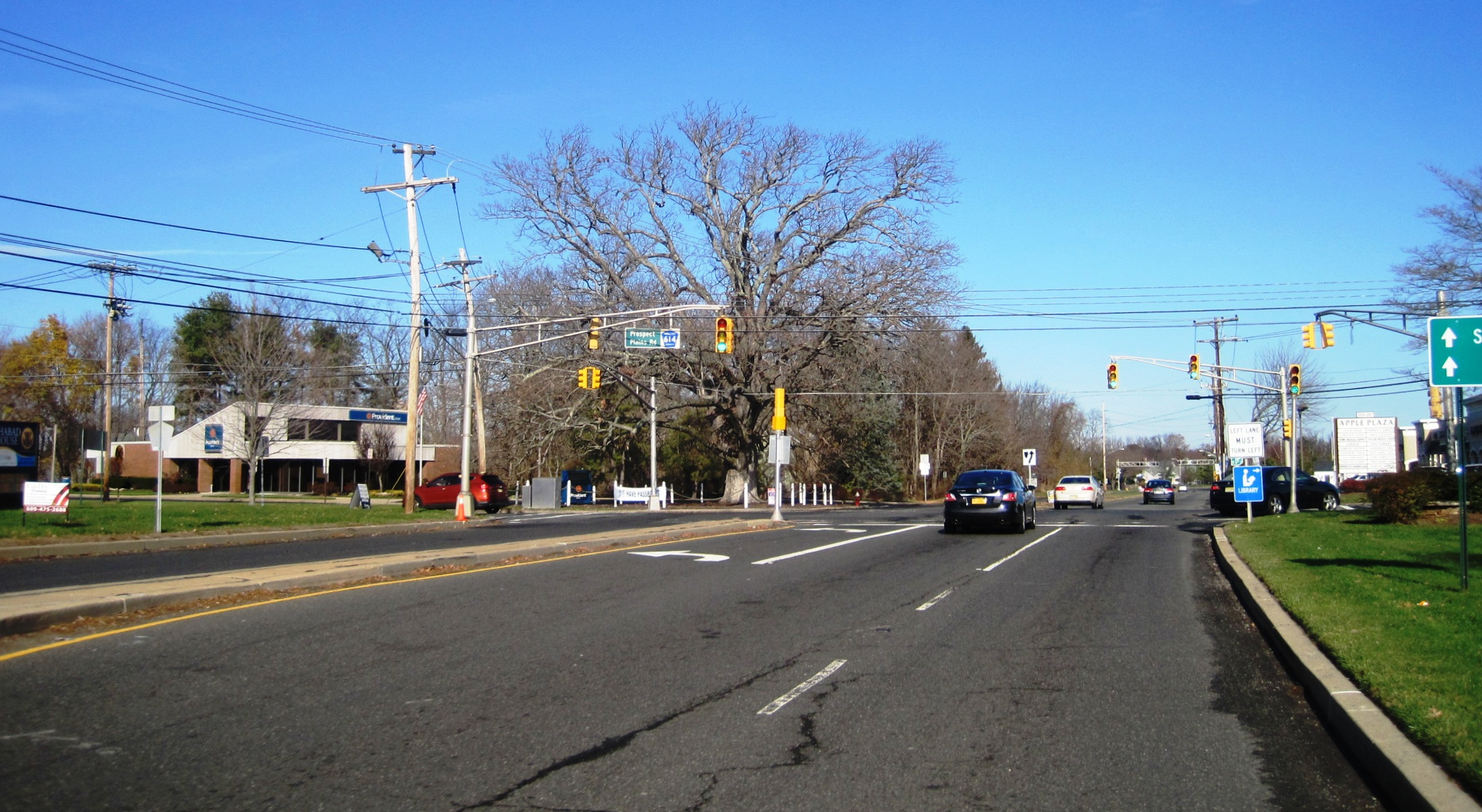
- Looking north along Applegarth Road (CR 619) towards Prospect Plains Road (CR 614)

- Location of Prospect Plains in Middlesex County Inset: Location of county within the state of New Jersey Prospect Plains (New Jersey) Prospect Plains (the United States)
- Coordinates: 40°19′26″N 74°28′16″W
- Country: United States
- State: New Jersey
- County: Middlesex
- Township: Monroe
- Elevation: 128 ft (39 m)
- GNIS feature ID: 879505

Prospect Plains is an unincorporated community located within Monroe Township in Middlesex County, in the U.S. state of New Jersey. The settlement is located at the intersection of Prospect Plains Road (County Route 614) and Applegarth Road (CR 619). Retail businesses generally line the two aforementioned county roads in the area but some single-family houses are clustered around the site of the Camden & Amboy railroad crossing of Prospect Plains Road.

The location is the site of the Monroe Oak, a white oak tree present at the time of the township's establishment in 1838. Following the attempted development at the site of the tree to a gas station, the tree has been preserved and became the official symbol of Monroe Township. Prospect Plains was also the site of a railroad station on the Camden & Amboy Railroad, a one-room school house, and was the long-time home of the township's municipal office.
