= Spotswood Manor, New Jersey =

Populated place in Middlesex County, New Jersey, US

- Unincorporated community
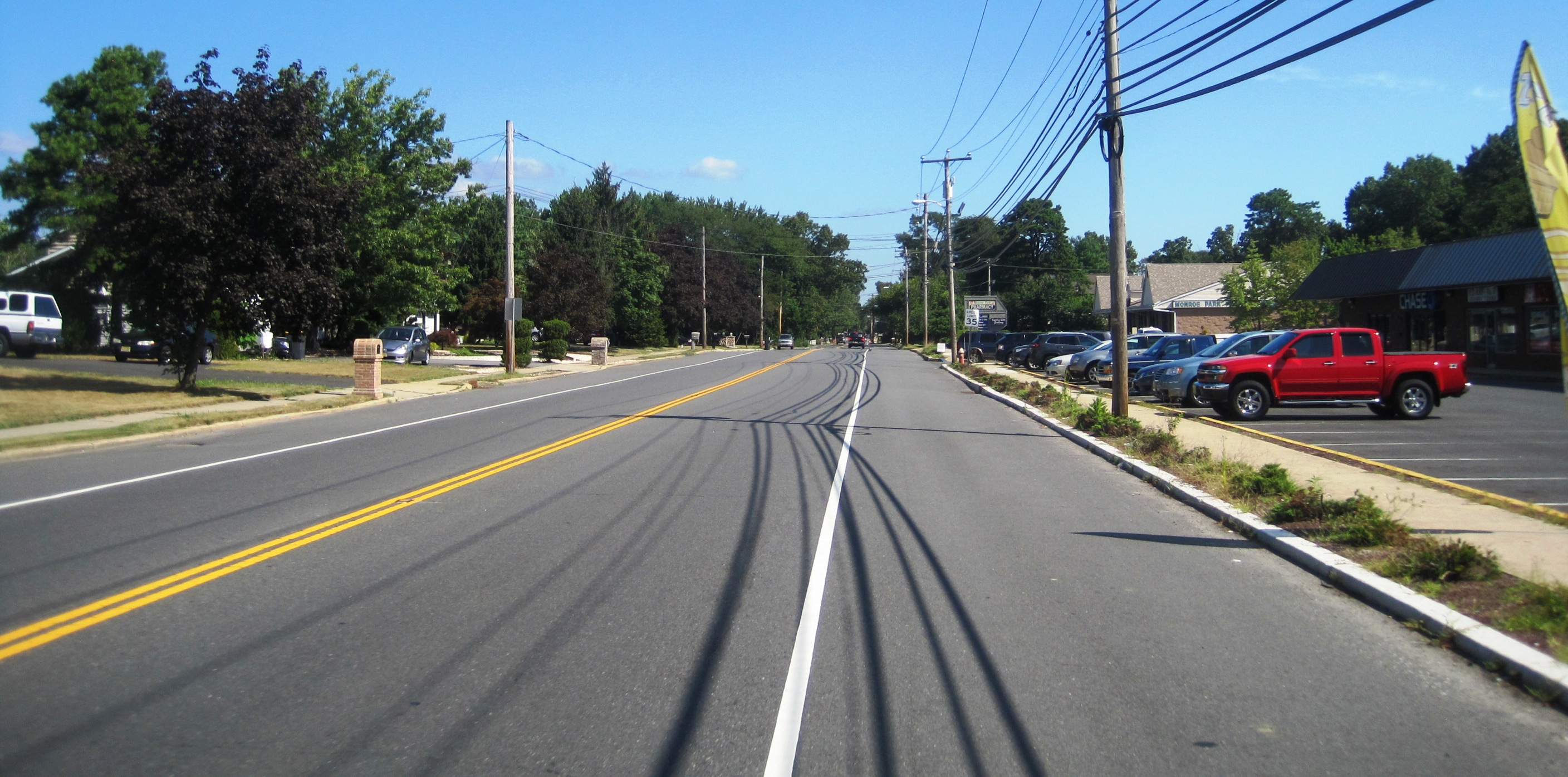
- Along Spotswood-Englishtown Road (CR 613)

- Location of Spotswood Manor in Middlesex County Inset: Location of county within the state of New Jersey Spotswood Manor (New Jersey) Spotswood Manor (the United States)
- Coordinates: 40°22′40″N 74°22′59″W
- Country: United States
- State: New Jersey
- County: Middlesex
- Township: Monroe
- Elevation: 30 ft (9.1 m)
- GNIS feature ID: 883009

Spotswood Manor is an unincorporated community located within Monroe Township in Middlesex County, in the U.S. state of New Jersey. The settlement is located just south of the borough of Spotswood, most of them consist of small homes, though businesses and strip malls line Spotswood-Englishtown Road (County Route 613), the main road through the area.
