= Irene Craigmile Bolam =

American banker and aviator (1904–1982)

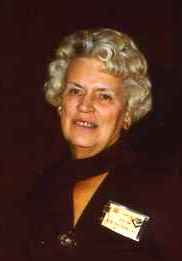
- Bolam c. 1980
- Born: Irene Madalaine O'Crowley; October 1, 1904; Newark, New Jersey, U.S.
- Died: July 7, 1982 (aged 77); Belford, New Jersey, U.S.
- Occupation: Banker
- Known for: Allegedly being Amelia Earhart
- Spouses: Charles Craigmile (m. 1928; died 1931) Alvin Heller (m. 1933; ann. 1940) Guy Bolam (m. 1958; died 1970)
- Children: 1

Irene Craigmile Bolam (born Irene Madalaine O'Crowley; October 1, 1904 – July 7, 1982) was an American banker and resident of Monroe Township, Middlesex County, New Jersey. In 1970, a book that she discredited set forth an allegation that she was Amelia Earhart. Bolam took legal action against the publisher (McGraw Hill), resulting in the book being withdrawn although it has since gone back on the market.

== Amelia Earhart theory ==
In 1965, Joseph Gervais received an invitation to speak at a retired pilots' gathering, where one of Amelia Earhart's friends, Viola Gentry, introduced him to Mrs. Bolam. Gervais thought he recognized her as Amelia Earhart and started to research her past. Gervais and author Joe Klaas documented his position in the book Amelia Earhart Lives (1970). Bolam denied being Earhart, filed a lawsuit and submitted an affidavit rebutting the claim.

Bolam's personal life history has since been thoroughly documented, eliminating any possibility she was Earhart. The evidence presented in the affidavit included her 1937 private pilot's license and marriage certificate. Born Irene Madalaine O'Crowley, she married Charles Craigmile, and after his death, married Alvin Heller in 1933. They had a son in 1934 named Clarence Alvin Heller, but their marriage was annulled in 1940. She married Guy Bolam in 1958.

On her death, Gervais sought permission to photograph and fingerprint the body. It was denied.

After Amelia Earhart Lives, three additional books were published claiming that Bolam and Earhart were one and the same. They are Stand By To Die by Robert Myers and Barbara Wiley (1985), Amelia Earhart Survived by Colonel Rollin C. Reineck (2003), and Amelia Earhart: Beyond the Grave by W. C. Jameson (2016).
