= Stonebridge, New Jersey =

Populated place in Camden County, New Jersey, US

- Census-designated place
- Location in Middlesex County Location in New Jersey Location in the United States
- Coordinates: 40°17′39″N 74°27′59″W
- Country: United States
- State: New Jersey
- County: Middlesex
- Township: Monroe

Area
  - Total: 0.46 sq mi (1.19 km^{2})
  - Land: 0.46 sq mi (1.19 km^{2})
  - Water: 0 sq mi (0.00 km^{2})
- Elevation: 125 ft (38 m)

Population (2020)
  - Total: 1,616
  - Density: 3,525.1/sq mi (1,361.03/km^{2})
- Time zone: UTC−05:00 (Eastern (EST))
  - Summer (DST): UTC−04:00 (EDT)
- ZIP Code: 08831 (Monroe Township)
- Area codes: 732/848
- FIPS code: 34-70987
- GNIS feature ID: 2806193

Stonebridge is a gated community and census-designated place (CDP) in Monroe Township, Middlesex County, in the U.S. state of New Jersey. As of the 2020 census, the year it was first listed as a CDP, the population was 1,616.

== Geography ==
Stonebridge is in southern Middlesex County, in the southwestern part of Monroe Township, on the east side of Applegarth Road and the north side of Federal Road. It is 1 mile (1.6 km) south of Clearbrook, 5 miles (8 km) south of Jamesburg and 4 miles (6 km) northeast of Hightstown.

According to the U.S. Census Bureau, the Stonebridge CDP has an area of 0.46 square miles (1.19 km^{2}), of which 0.001 square miles (0.003 km^{2}), or 0.22%, are water. Cranbury Brook runs along the northeast edge of the community, flowing northwest toward the Millstone River at Plainsboro, and thus part of the Raritan River watershed.

== Demographics ==
Historical population
Census	Pop.	Note	%±
2020	1,616		—
U.S. Decennial Census

Stonebridge was first listed as a census designated place in the 2020 U.S. census.

Stonebridge CDP, New Jersey – Racial and ethnic composition Note: the US Census treats Hispanic/Latino as an ethnic category. This table excludes Latinos from the racial categories and assigns them to a separate category. Hispanics/Latinos may be of any race.
Race / Ethnicity (NH = Non-Hispanic)	Pop 2020	2020
White alone (NH)	1,344	83.17%
Black or African American alone (NH)	41	2.54%
Native American or Alaska Native alone (NH)	0	0.00%
Asian alone (NH)	156	9.65%
Native Hawaiian or Pacific Islander alone (NH)	0	0.00%
Other race alone (NH)	1	0.06%
Mixed race or Multiracial (NH)	29	1.79%
Hispanic or Latino (any race)	45	2.78%
Total	1,616	100.00%
