= Middlesex Downs, New Jersey =

Populated place in Middlesex County, New Jersey, US

- Unincorporated community
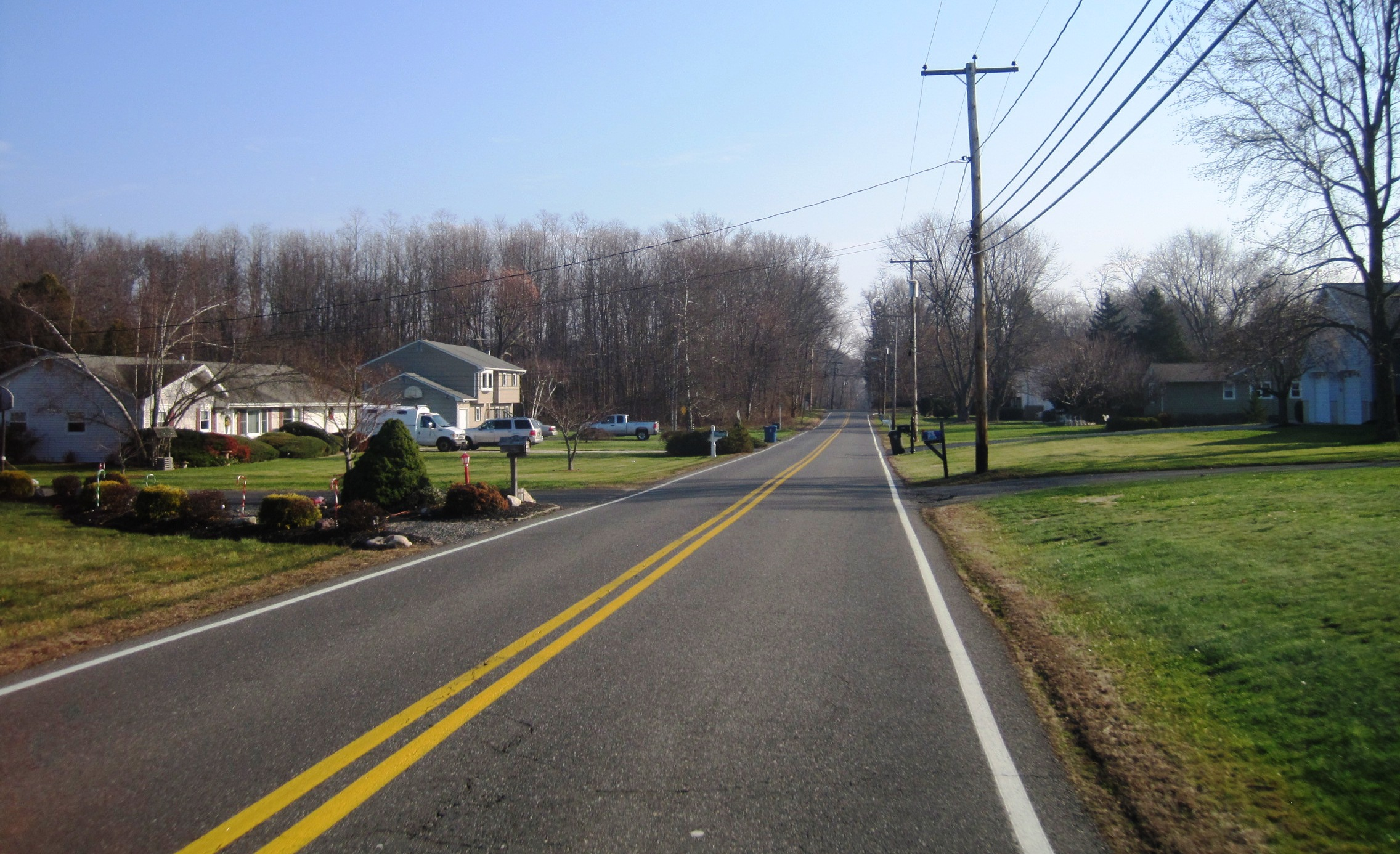
- Looking east along Dey Grove Road

- Location in Middlesex County Middlesex Downs (New Jersey) Middlesex Downs (the United States)
- Coordinates: 40°17′15″N 74°24′14″W
- Country: United States
- State: New Jersey
- County: Middlesex
- Township: Monroe
- Elevation: 95 ft (29 m)
- GNIS feature ID: 883005

Middlesex Downs is an unincorporated community located within Monroe Township in Middlesex County, in the U.S. state of New Jersey. The wholly residential settlement contains small homes along Dey Grove Road and Bergen Mills Road with larger homes in developments towards the south. The township-owned James Monroe Memorial Park is also located in this settlement. Much of the area to the north of Dey Grove Road consists of forest land but at one time this was planned to become a large planned community arranged in a street grid. The small property parcels and paper streets remain on township tax maps today.
