= Forsgate, New Jersey =

Populated place in Middlesex County, New Jersey, US

- Census-designated place
- Location in Middlesex County Location in New Jersey Location in the United States
- Coordinates: 40°20′55″N 74°27′49″W
- Country: United States
- State: New Jersey
- County: Middlesex
- Township: Monroe

Area
  - Total: 0.88 sq mi (2.28 km^{2})
  - Land: 0.88 sq mi (2.27 km^{2})
  - Water: 0.0039 sq mi (0.01 km^{2})
- Elevation: 145 ft (44 m)

Population (2020)
  - Total: 2,056
  - Density: 2,349.0/sq mi (906.96/km^{2})
- Time zone: UTC−05:00 (Eastern (EST))
  - Summer (DST): UTC−04:00 (EDT)
- ZIP Code: 08831 (Monroe Township)
- Area codes: 732/848
- FIPS code: 34-24285
- GNIS feature ID: 2806083

Forsgate is a golf course community and census-designated place (CDP) in Monroe Township, Middlesex County, New Jersey, United States. It consists of Forsgate Country Club and its associated housing developments. As of the 2020 United States census, it had a population of 2,056.

== Geography ==
Forsgate is in southern Middlesex County, in the northwestern part of Monroe Township, bordered to the south across Forsgate Drive by Rossmoor, to the east by the Hightstown Industrial Track rail line, to the north by a branch rail line connecting Jamesburg and Monmouth Junction, and to the west by the New Jersey Turnpike at Exit 8A. It is 13 miles (21 km) south of New Brunswick and 19 miles (31 km) northeast of Trenton.

According to the U.S. Census Bureau, the Forsgate CDP has an area of 0.879 square miles (2.277 km^{2}), of which 0.004 square miles (0.010 km^{2}), or 0.46%, are water. Land in the CDP drains northeast toward Manalapan Brook, a northeast-flowing tributary of the South River, part of the Raritan River watershed.

== Demographics ==
Historical population
Census	Pop.	Note	%±
2020	2,056		—
U.S. Decennial Census; 2020

Forsgate first appeared as a census designated place in the 2020 U.S. census.

=== 2020 census ===
As of the 2020 census, Forsgate had a population of 2,056. The median age was 41.8 years. 26.7% of residents were under the age of 18 and 14.5% of residents were 65 years of age or older. For every 100 females there were 99.8 males, and for every 100 females age 18 and over there were 100.0 males age 18 and over.

100.0% of residents lived in urban areas, while 0.0% lived in rural areas.

There were 660 households in Forsgate, of which 51.2% had children under the age of 18 living in them. Of all households, 85.2% were married-couple households, 7.1% were households with a male householder and no spouse or partner present, and 7.0% were households with a female householder and no spouse or partner present. About 7.6% of all households were made up of individuals and 4.6% had someone living alone who was 65 years of age or older.

There were 665 housing units, of which 0.8% were vacant. The homeowner vacancy rate was 0.0% and the rental vacancy rate was 0.0%.

Forsgate CDP, New Jersey – Racial and ethnic composition Note: the US Census treats Hispanic/Latino as an ethnic category. This table excludes Latinos from the racial categories and assigns them to a separate category. Hispanics/Latinos may be of any race.
Race / Ethnicity (NH = Non-Hispanic)	Pop 2020	2020
White alone (NH)	553	26.90%
Black or African American alone (NH)	49	2.38%
Native American or Alaska Native alone (NH)	2	0.10%
Asian alone (NH)	1,379	67.07%
Native Hawaiian or Pacific Islander alone (NH)	0	0.00%
Other race alone (NH)	2	0.10%
Mixed race or Multiracial (NH)	18	0.88%
Hispanic or Latino (any race)	53	2.58%
Total	2,056	100.00%
