= Gravel Hill, New Jersey =

Populated place in Middlesex County, New Jersey, US

- Unincorporated community
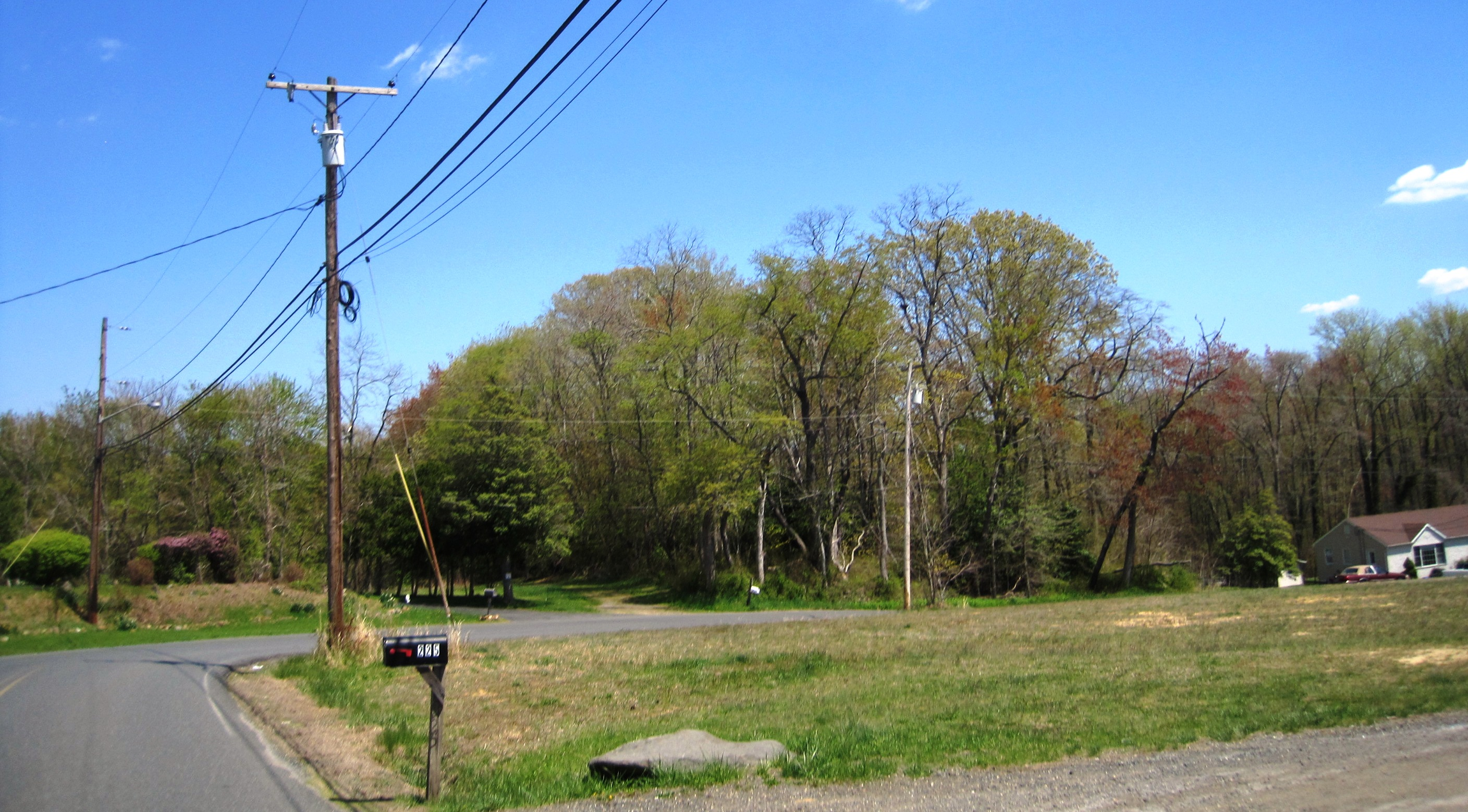
- Scene along Gravel Hill Road

- Location within Middlesex County, New Jersey Location within New Jersey Location within the United States
- Coordinates: 40°17′59″N 74°25′10″W
- Country: United States
- State: New Jersey
- County: Middlesex
- Township: Monroe
- Elevation: 148 ft (45 m)
- GNIS feature ID: 876722

Gravel Hill or Gravelhill is an unincorporated community located within Monroe Township in Middlesex County, in the U.S. state of New Jersey. Located in a rural part of Monroe Township, the area is made up of approximately half farmland and half forestland. Homes line the roads that run through the area.
