= Old Church, New Jersey =

Populated place in Middlesex County, New Jersey, US

- Unincorporated community
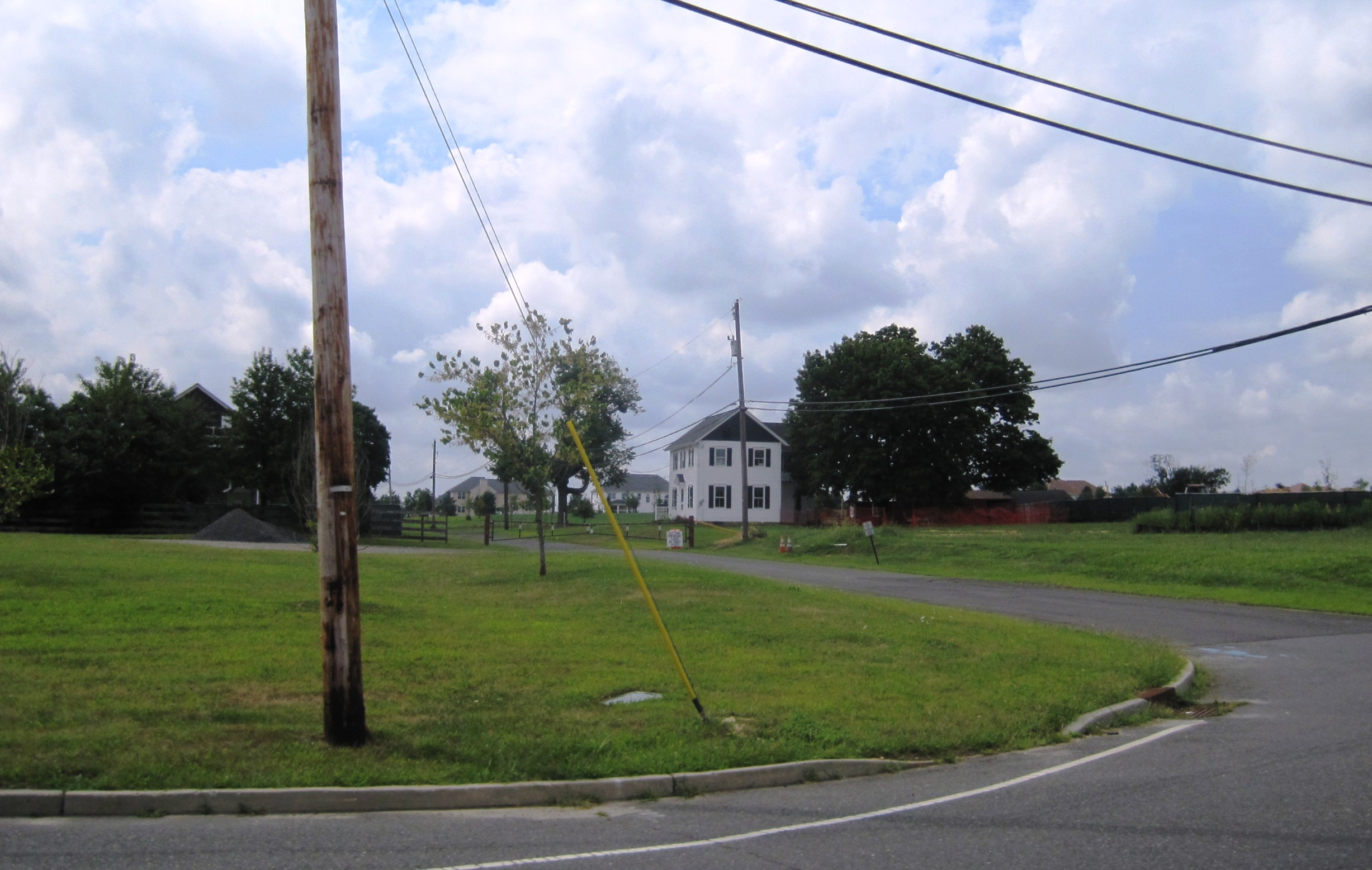
- Historic Dey Farm in Old Church

- Location in Middlesex County Old Church (New Jersey) Old Church (the United States)
- Coordinates: 40°17′29″N 74°27′47″W
- Country: United States
- State: New Jersey
- County: Middlesex
- Township: Monroe
- Elevation: 125 ft (38 m)
- Time zone: UTC−05:00 (Eastern (EST))
  - Summer (DST): UTC−04:00 (EDT)
- GNIS feature ID: 878954

Old Church is an unincorporated community located within Monroe Township in Middlesex County, in the U.S. state of New Jersey. The settlement is named for a Presbyterian community that settled on the site but relocated to Cranbury c. 1740. Originally, the area was farmland. One of the farms in the area was the Dey Farm, in existence since the founding of Monroe Township in 1838 and the site of a command post used by George Washington during the Battle of Monmouth in 1778. Starting in 2004, the area experienced a major change from its agricultural roots to single-family residences on the south side of the area and age-restricted communities to the north. This redevelopment also caused the severing of the main north–south road, Old Church Road and the extension of Federal Road which formerly had its western end at Old Church Road to Applegarth Road. The a farmhouse named England House was moved 4,000 feet (1,200 m) to the Dey Farm site to preserve the area's history prior to the construction of the new houses in 2004.
