= Monroe Township, Middlesex County, New Jersey =

Township in Middlesex County, New Jersey, US

Monroe Township, New Jersey
- Township
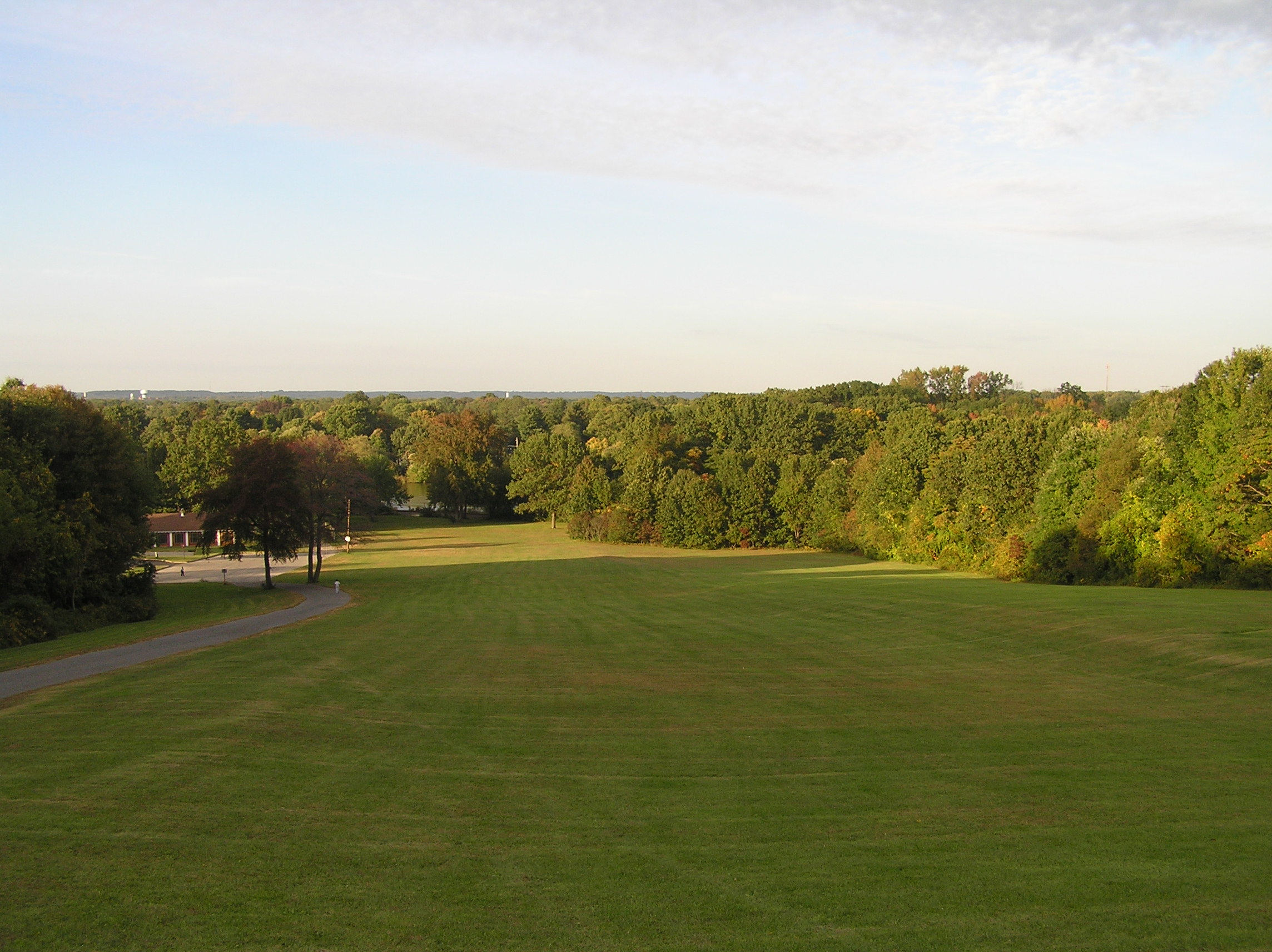
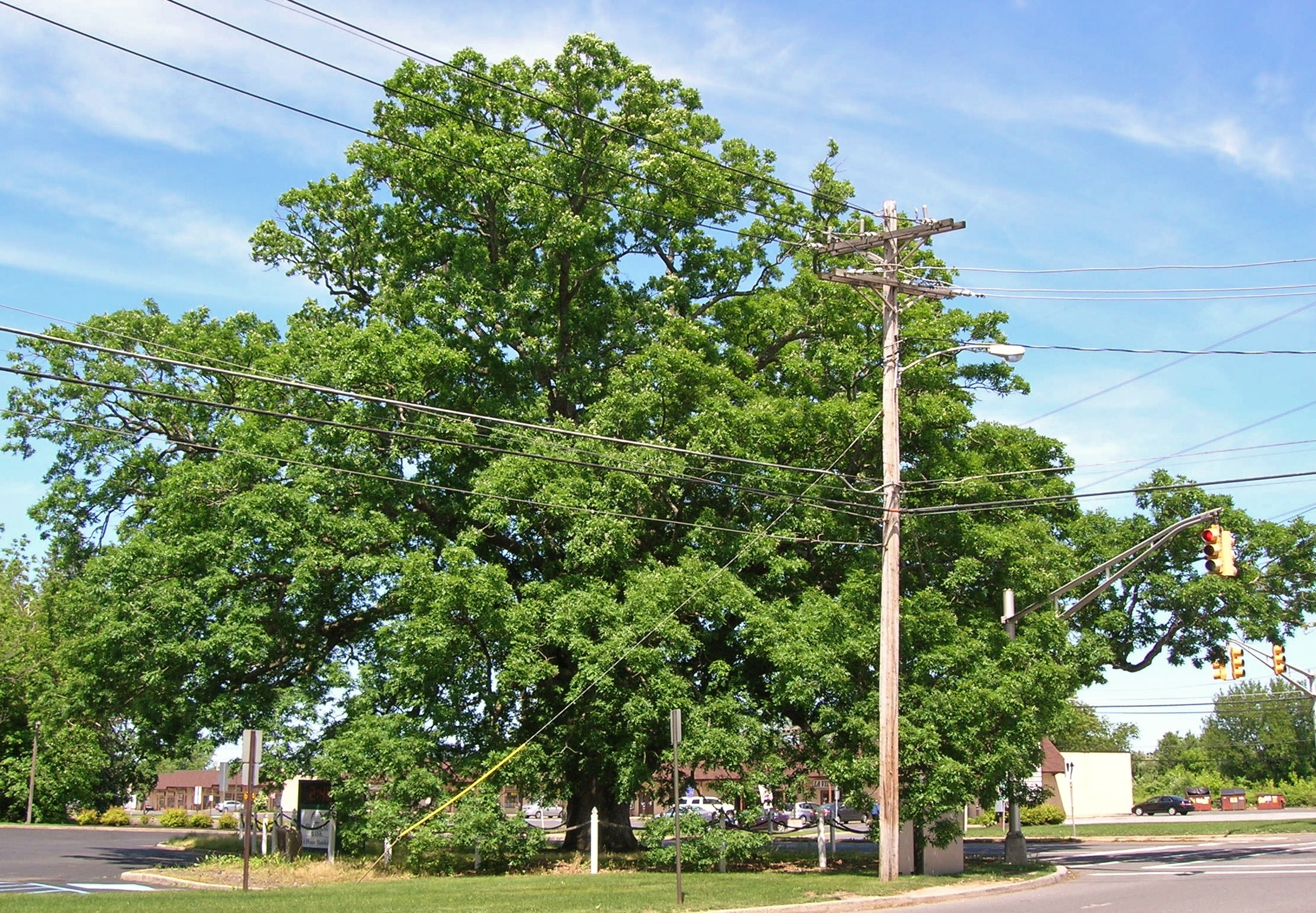
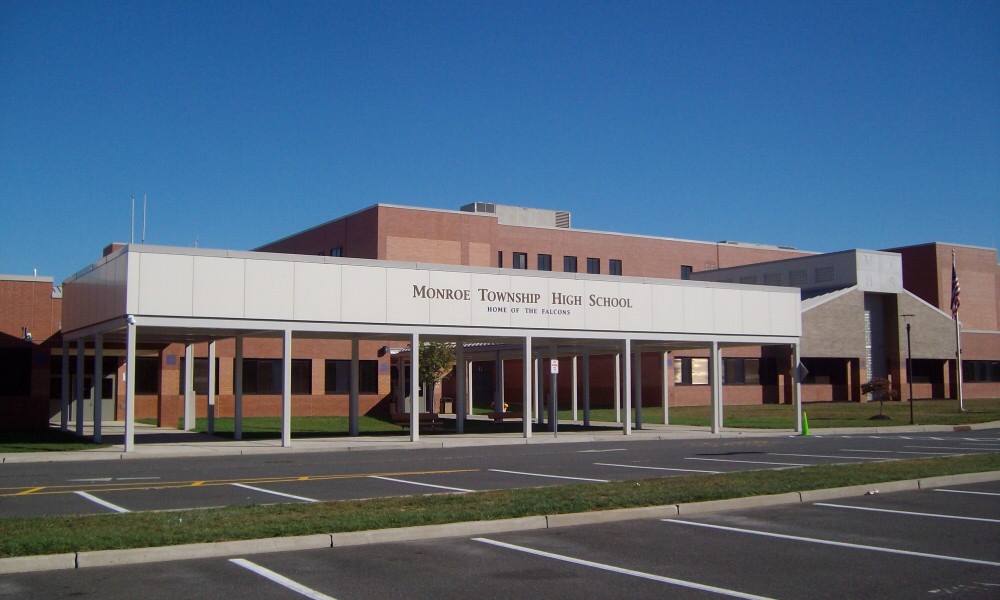
- Thompson Park green belt White oak tree known as "The Monroe Oak" Monroe Township High School

- Seal
- Nicknames: "Tree City", "The Education City"
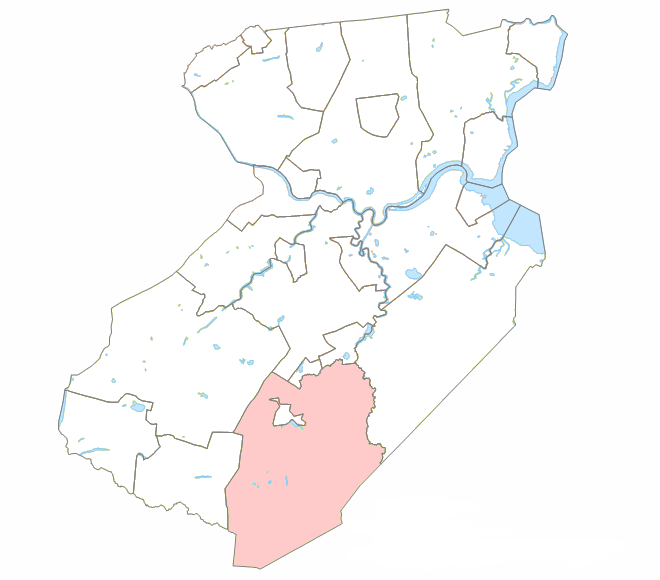
- Monroe Township highlighted in Middlesex County

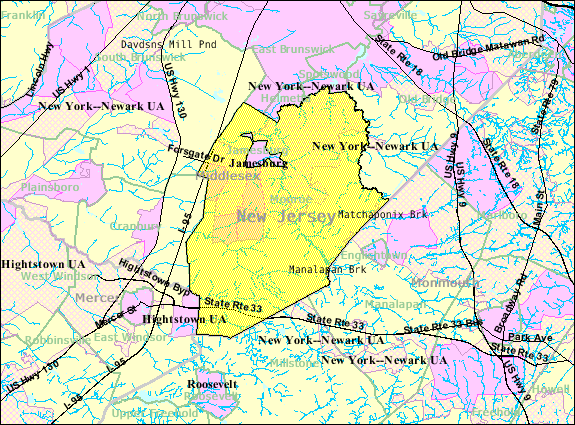
- Census Bureau map of Monroe Township, Middlesex County, New Jersey.
- Interactive map of Monroe Township, New Jersey
- Location in Middlesex County Location in New Jersey Location in the United States
- Coordinates: 40.319474°N 74.428802°W
- Country: United States
- State: New Jersey
- County: Middlesex
- Incorporated: April 9, 1838
- Named for: James Monroe

Government
  - Type: Faulkner Act (mayor–council)
  - Body: Township Council
  - Mayor: Stephen Dalina (D, term ends December 31, 2027)
  - Administrator: Kevin J. McGowan
  - Municipal clerk: Christine Robbins

Area
  - Total: 42.19 sq mi (109.26 km^{2})
  - Land: 41.94 sq mi (108.63 km^{2})
  - Water: 0.24 sq mi (0.63 km^{2}) 0.58%
  - Rank: 47th of 565 in state 1st of 25 in county
- Elevation: 92 ft (28 m)

Population (2020)
  - Total: 48,594
  - Estimate (2024): 50,157
  - Rank: 41st of 565 in state 8th of 25 in county
  - Density: 1,158.6/sq mi (447.3/km^{2})
  - Rank: 365th of 565 in state 23rd of 25 in county
- Time zone: UTC−05:00 (Eastern (EST))
  - Summer (DST): UTC−04:00 (Eastern (EDT))
- ZIP Code: 08831
- Area codes: 609, 640, 732, and 848
- FIPS code: 3402347280
- GNIS feature ID: 0882159
- Website: www.monroetwp.com

Monroe Township is a township located in southern Middlesex County, in the U.S. state of New Jersey. The township is centrally located within the Raritan Valley region and is an outer-ring suburb of New York City within the New York metropolitan area. As of the 2020 United States census, the township's population was 48,594, its highest decennial count ever and an increase of 9,462 (+24.2%) from the 39,132 recorded at the 2010 census, which in turn reflected an increase of 11,133 (+39.8%) from the 27,999 counted in the 2000 census. Monroe Township also comprises the largest land area of any municipality in Middlesex County, at approximately 42 square miles (110 km^{2}).

Monroe Township was incorporated as a township by an act of the New Jersey Legislature on April 9, 1838, from portions of South Amboy Township, based on the results of a referendum held that same day. Portions of the township were taken to form East Brunswick (February 28, 1860), Cranbury (March 7, 1872), and Jamesburg (March 19, 1887).

There are several age-restricted communities in Monroe Township. Despite significant senior citizen population growth, the median age in Monroe has changed from 52.5 in 1990, increasing to 58.9 in 2000, before decreasing to 53.2 in 2010, as more growth recently has resulted from single-family detached homes than from senior citizen developments. Based upon analysis of data from the FBI's Uniform Crime Reports for 2022 and 2023, Monroe Township was ranked as the safest small city in the United States.

== History ==
The earliest settlers in what would become Monroe Township were the Lenape Native Americans. Monroe Township was founded in April 1838 and named in honor of the fifth President of the United States, James Monroe.

For many decades, the township area was largely a farming community. After parts of the township grew into the more densely populated neighborhoods of Helmetta, Jamesburg, and Spotswood in the late 19th century, they seceded. Railroads came into Monroe from just about the very beginning, starting with the Camden and Amboy Rail Road in the 1830s and 1840s.

In 1905, Bernarr Macfadden, the proponent of physical culture, came to the part of Monroe near Helmetta and Spotswood, and attempted to set up a camp called "Physical Culture City", where he could teach his beliefs in relative peace. However, in 1907, Macfadden was arrested for distribution of pornography and the camp dissolved. The area of this camp became the Outcalt neighborhood.

The New Jersey State Home for Boys, later known as the Training School for Boys, and now the New Jersey Training School for Boys, was established near Jamesburg. It was opened in 1867 as a home for troubled youth; however, by the mid-20th century, its purpose was to rehabilitate juvenile delinquents. One of the better known residents of the State Home was Rubin "Hurricane" Carter. Clarence Clemons of Bruce Springsteen and the E Street Band was a counselor there for many years during the 1960s before he found fame as a saxophone player with Springsteen.

The township became more suburban between 1960 and 1968, when the New Jersey Turnpike opened up Exit 8A in the western part of Monroe, in conjunction with the effort to develop the Leisure World age-restricted community of Rossmoor. Since then, at least five more communities for senior citizens have joined Rossmoor: Concordia, Clearbrook, Greenbriar at Whittingham, The Ponds, Encore, Stonebridge, and the Regency at Monroe, with more under development. At the same time, and over the next few decades, suburban communities for people of all ages spread into the northern parts of Monroe Township, prompting the expansion of several schools and the construction of new ones. Since 1980, in addition to the age restricted communities, Monroe has added shopping centers, synagogues, a large Hindu mandir, a recreation center, and a new library.

Circa 1980, it was found that a landfill which was located at the corner of what is now Spotswood Gravel Hill Road and Carnegie Street, contaminated the ground water which forced Outcalt residents to get municipal-supplied water. The 86-acre (35 ha) site had been run as a landfill for municipal waste since 1955, first by the township and later by an independent operator.

On March 22, 2006, ten residents of Monroe Township, from The Ponds retirement community, were killed in a tour bus accident in the Andes mountains in northern Chile. The tour had been arranged by Jewish organization B'nai B'rith.

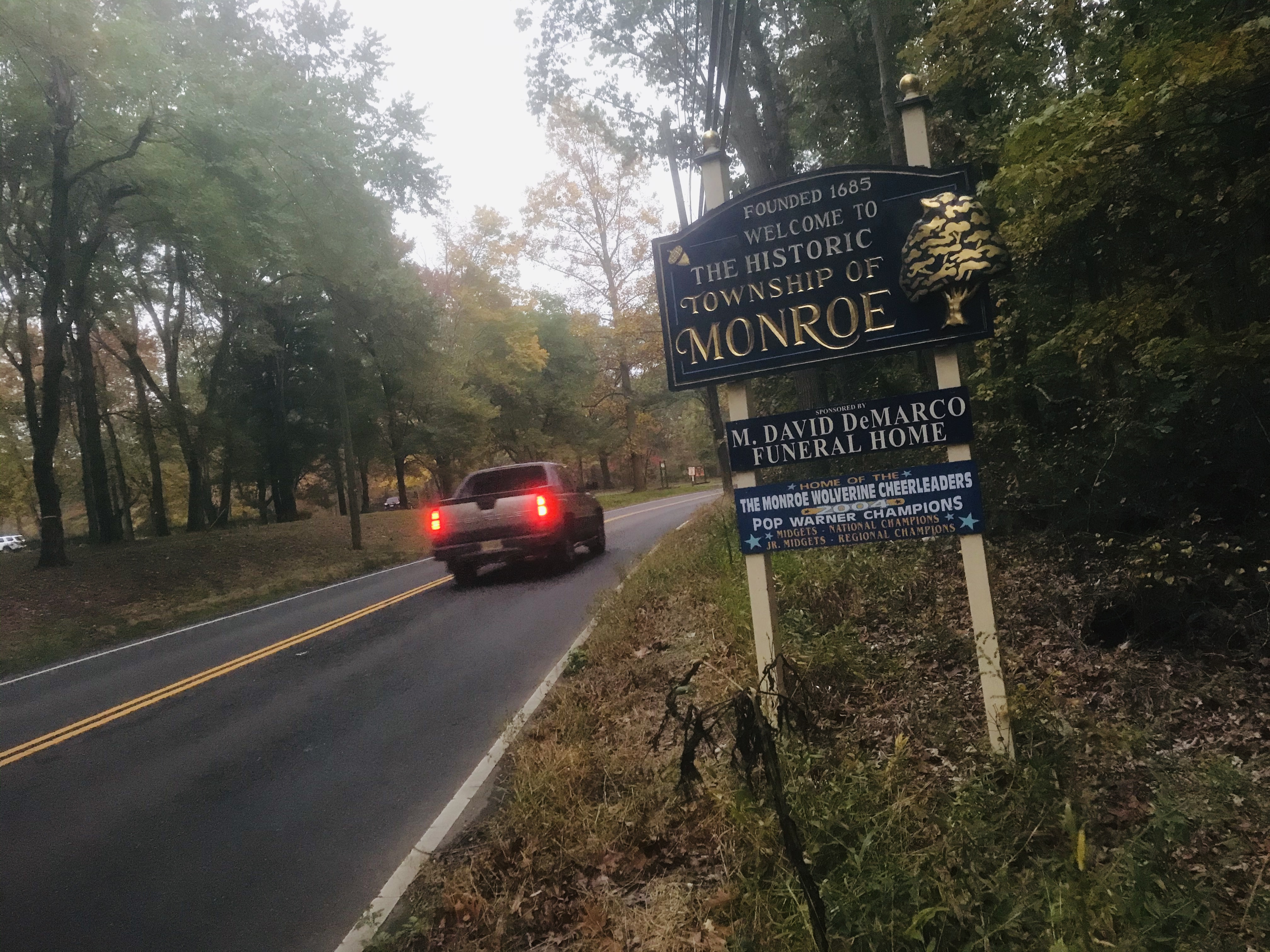
Welcome to Monroe Township sign

Since the early 2000s, Monroe has experienced a surge in residential development. New communities are being erected, usually around Route 33 and the New Jersey Turnpike. Portions of Monroe's farmland are receiving commercial zoning. Roads have been widened to allow for the extra vehicular volume. Warehouses are being/have been constructed in the last few years along CR 535, located near the 8A toll gate. The northern section of the township is already developed, with developers heading further south in Monroe to start new communities. New adult communities have set ground in central Monroe, along Route 33 and on CR 615. While these new senior citizen housing units are being built, luxury homes are also being constructed.

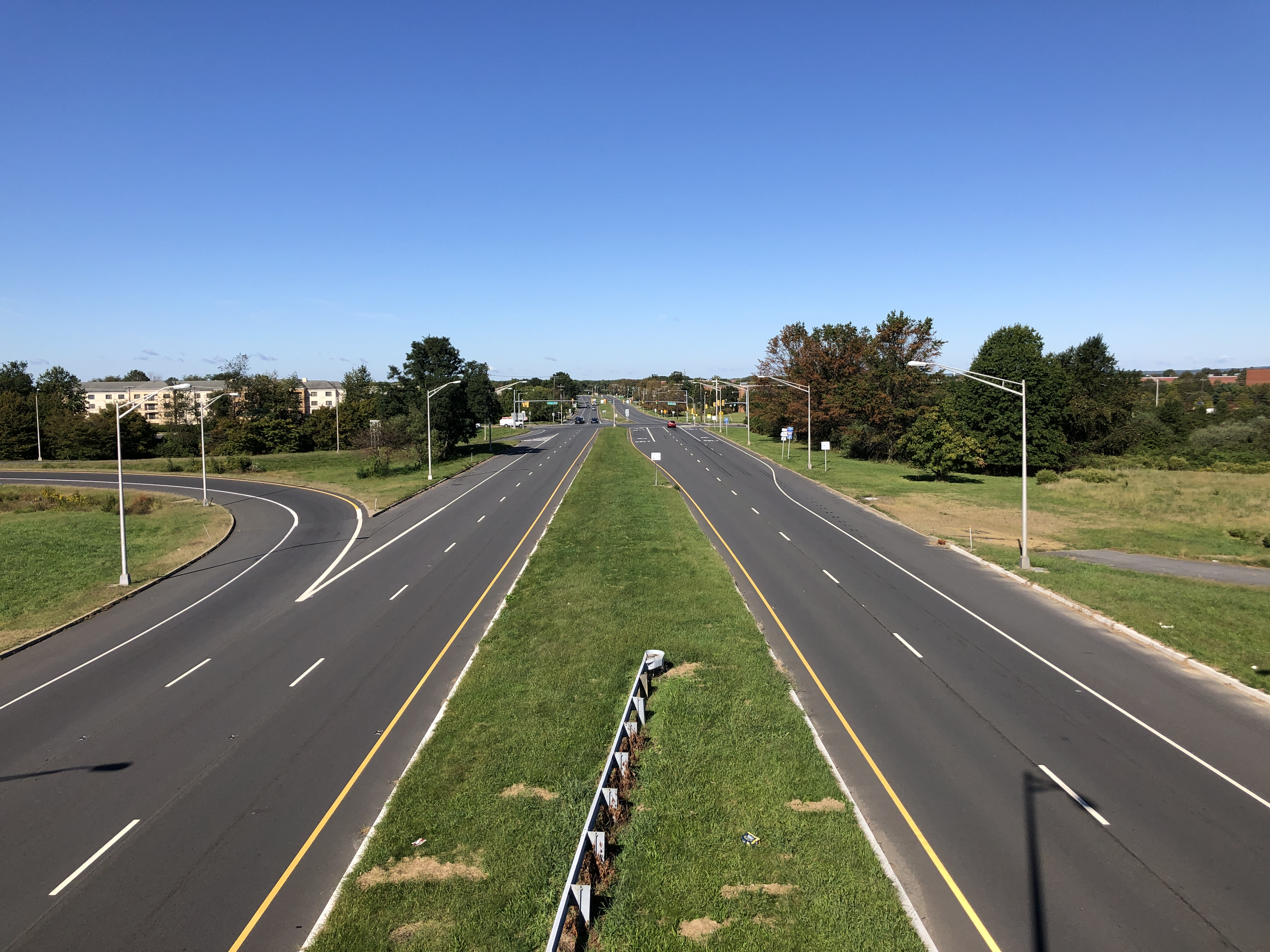
Looking west from the New Jersey Turnpike at Exit 8A along Route 32 at the border of South Brunswick and Monroe townships

There is an ongoing expansion of the Monroe Township High School that is relocating it onto portions of Thompson Park. This project slowly received approval after an archaeological study concluded that the land was not historically significant, except about 3 to 4 acres (12,000 to 16,000 m^{2}) of land. The controversy that led to the study involved a Lenape settlement, Bethel Indian Town, which protesters contended existed on the site, whereas supporters of the move of the high school claimed that Bethel Indian Town was a half-mile away. In late April 2008, construction started on the new high school, which then opened in September 2011. The old high school building is now being reused as the middle school. By early 2008, the State Preservation Office and New Jersey Department of Environmental Protection approved the de-accession of the land as a protected park. Ground breaking began immediately, only to be halted in June 2008 when additional remains were found. The consultant identified these stone foundation remains as a 19th-century farmstead, with no earlier association.

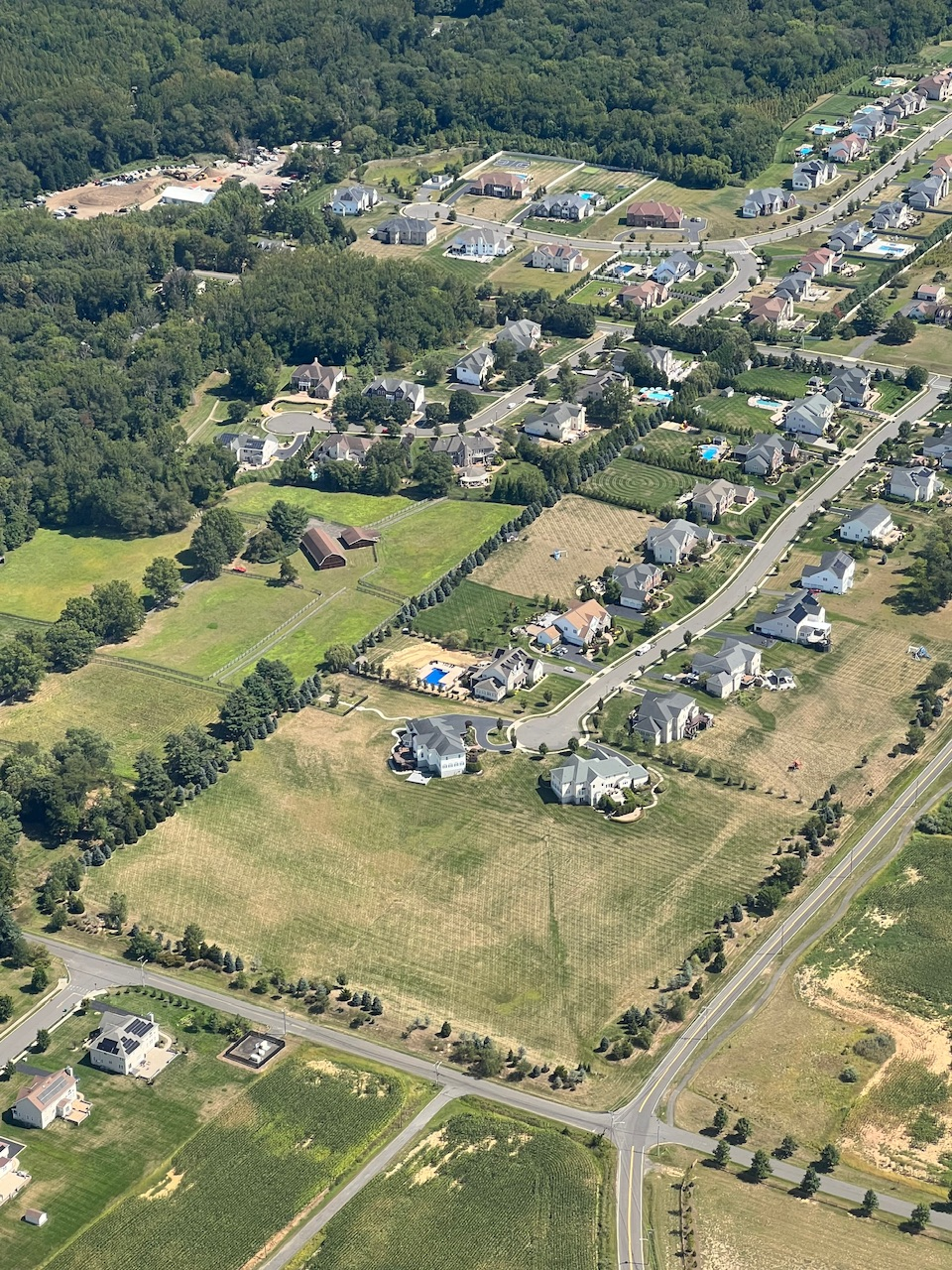
Monroe Township features suburban single family home neighborhoods nestled within natural surroundings comprising trees and farmland.

The township's Route 33 Land Development Task Force is considering options for developing the area of land along Route 33 from the township's border with East Windsor to Millstone Township.

This proposal would include the construction of new luxury houses, a new grocery store, a baseball park, a performing arts center, a bus stop, new restaurants, and new businesses.

In May 2021, Monroe Township coordinated a financial relief effort toward the COVID-19 pandemic in India.

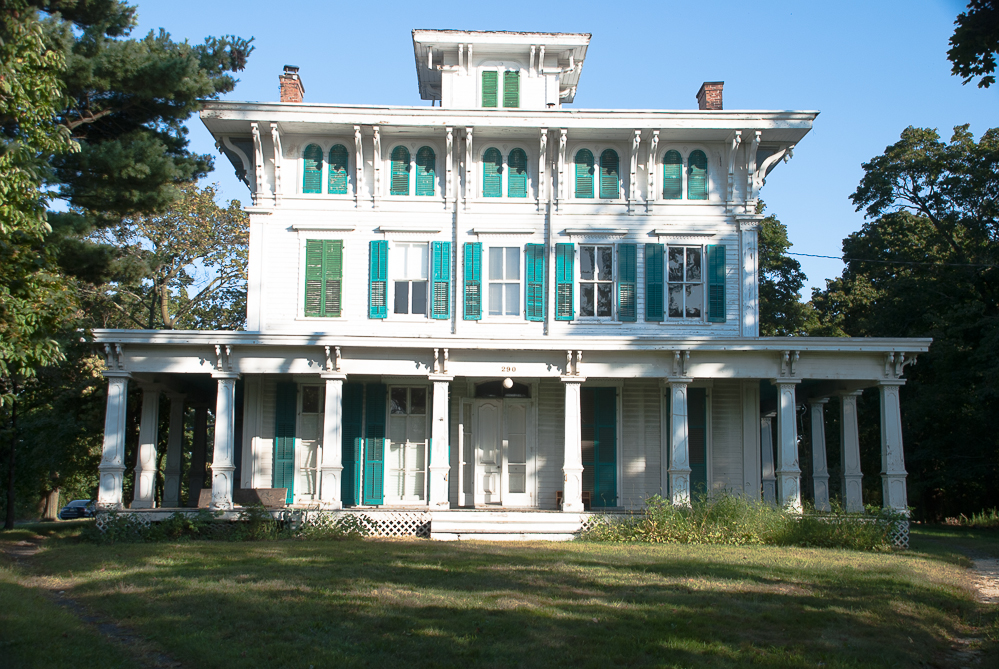
The former Holmes–Tallman House, prior to its demolition in 2025

The former Holmes–Tallman House is listed on both the New Jersey Register of Historic Places and the U.S. National Register of Historic Places, the only such home in Monroe Township. Constructed in 1860, the Italiante-style home covered 5,000 square feet (460 m^{2}). A proposed 2013 amendment to the township's master plan rezoned the site to commercial, which would allow potential reuse of the site. The house was demolished in 2025, before which efforts were made to preserve artifacts and to document the interior and exterior of the home.

== Geography ==
According to the United States Census Bureau, the township comprised a total area of 42.19 square miles (109.26 km^{2}), including 41.94 square miles (108.63 km^{2}) of land and 0.24 square miles (0.63 km^{2}) of water (0.58%). It is the largest municipality in Middlesex County in terms of total area.

Clearbrook (with a 2020 population of 2,909), Concordia (2,455), Encore at Monroe (625), Forsgate (2,056), Monroe Manor (2,178), Regency at Monroe (2,036), Renaissance at Monroe (637), Rossmoor (2,992), Stonebridge (1,616), The Ponds (941), and Whittingham (2,348) are unincorporated communities and census-designated places (CDPs) located within Monroe Township.

Monroe completely surrounds Jamesburg, making them one of 21 pairs of "doughnut towns" in the state, where one municipality entirely surrounds another. The township borders Cranbury, East Brunswick, Helmetta, Old Bridge Township, South Brunswick and Spotswood in Middlesex County; East Windsor in Mercer County; and Manalapan Township and Millstone Township in Monmouth County.

=== Neighborhoods and historical place names ===
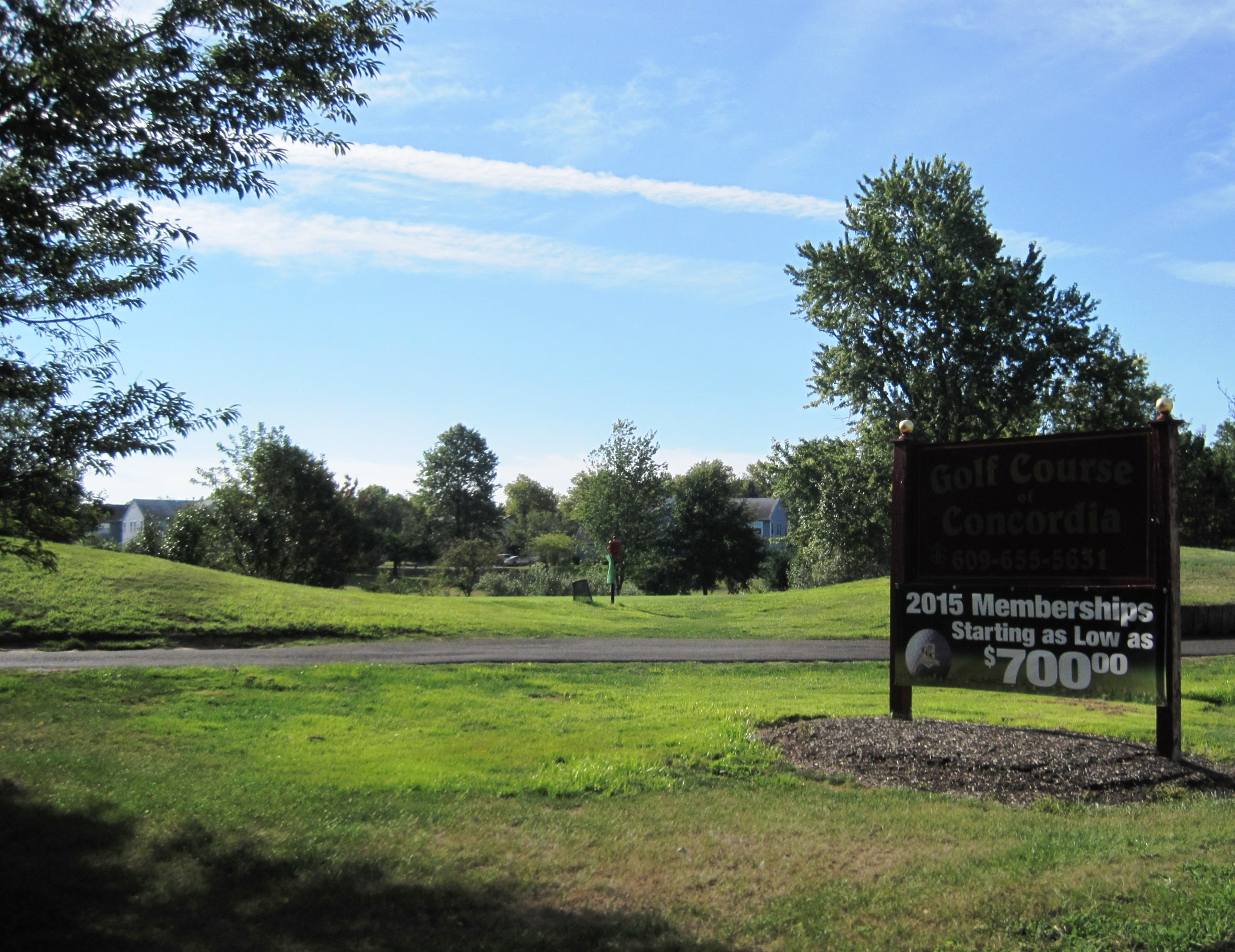
Golf course in the Concordia neighborhood, one of many age-restricted communities with greenways in Monroe Township

Monroe Township is not officially broken down into traditional neighborhoods (the Census-designated places oriented around active adult communities notwithstanding), but over the years, residents have given names to various unincorporated neighborhoods within the township. Three common names heard in the township are Mill Lake Manor (an area centered on Monmouth Road and 10th Avenue) and Outcalt (in the northern part of the township, near Spotswood and Helmetta). For those who have lived in Mill Lake Manor, the area is broken down further into the "Old" and "New" Manor (split by Monmouth Road on the east and west sides, the Old being east and the New being the west side). The Manor also encompasses the developments of Inwood. The neighborhood east of Spotswood-Englishtown Road, centered on Monmouth Road, extending down to 1st Avenue, is called North Manor or Manor Heights.

Unincorporated communities, localities and place names located partially or completely within the township include Applegarth, Gravel Hill (also spelled as Gravelhill), Half Acre (home to the retirement communities of Concordia and Whittingham), Hoffman, Jamesburg Gardens, Lower Jamesburg, Matchaponix, Middlesex Downs, Mounts Mills, Old Church, Outcalt, Pineview Estates, Prospect Plains (home to the retirement communities of Rossmoor and Clearbrook), Spotswood Manor, Texas, and Wyckoffs Mills.

Historical railroads (no longer active):

- Camden and Amboy Railroad
- Freehold and Jamesburg Railroad
- Pennsylvania Railroad Amboy Division (formerly the Camden and Amboy Railroad)
- Jamesurg Railroad Amboy Division (formerly the Freehold and Jamesburg Railroad)

== Demographics ==
Historical population
Census	Pop.	Note	%±
1840	2,453		—
1850	3,001		22.3%
1860	3,132	*	4.4%
1870	3,253		3.9%
1880	3,017	*	−7.3%
1890	2,153	*	−28.6%
1900	1,829		−15.0%
1910	2,238		22.4%
1920	2,625		17.3%
1930	2,894		10.2%
1940	3,034		4.8%
1950	4,082		34.5%
1960	5,831		42.8%
1970	9,138		56.7%
1980	15,858		73.5%
1990	22,255		40.3%
2000	27,999		25.8%
2010	39,132		39.8%
2020	48,594		24.2%
2024 (est.)	50,157		3.2%
Population sources: 1840–1920 1840 1850–1870; 1850 1870 1880–1890; 1890–1910 1910–1930 1940–2000; 2000 2010 2020 * = Lost territory in previous decade.

Monroe Township racial and ethnic composition as of 2020
Race	Number	Percentage
White (non-Hispanic)	30,185	62.1%
Black or African American (non-Hispanic)	1,655	3.4%
Native American	64	0.1%
Asian	12,913	26.6%
Pacific Islander	5	0.0%
Other/Mixed	3,021	6.2%
Hispanic or Latino	2,746	5.7%

As of the 2020 United States census, there were 48,594 people and 20,289 occupied housing units in the township. Monroe Township, like Middlesex County overall, has experienced a rapid growth rate in its Indian American population, with an estimated 5,943 (13.6%) as of 2017, which was 23 times the 256 (0.9%) counted as of the 2000 Census; and Diwali is celebrated by the township as a Hindu holiday. The Om Sri Sai Balaji Hindu temple hosts the largest indoor statue of the deity Hanuman in the United States.

Monroe has simultaneously emerged as a growing hub for congregations of Jewish Americans, hosting since 2010 the largest public menorah in New Jersey to celebrate Chanukah.

=== 2010 census ===
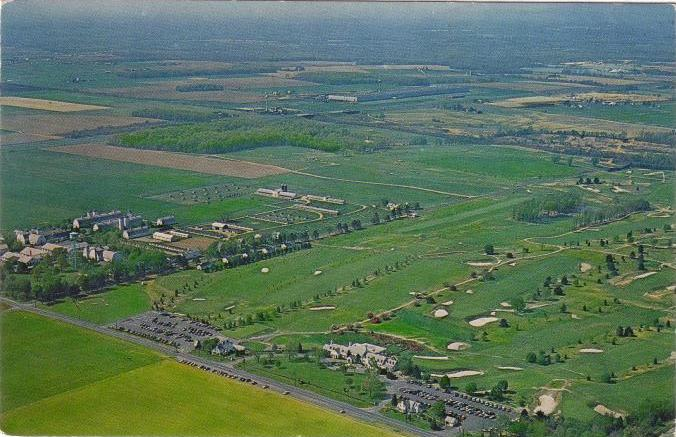
Aerial view of exurban Monroe Township farmland in the 1960s. Since then, significant new housing construction has generated an increasingly suburban environment.

The 2010 United States census counted 39,132 people, 16,497 households, and 10,872 families in the township. The population density was 932.3 per square mile (360.0/km^{2}). There were 18,002 housing units at an average density of 428.9 per square mile (165.6/km^{2}). The racial makeup was 81.55% (31,913) White, 3.92% (1,533) Black or African American, 0.08% (33) Native American, 12.60% (4,930) Asian, 0.01% (4) Pacific Islander, 0.62% (244) from other races, and 1.21% (475) from two or more races. Hispanic or Latino of any race were 4.28% (1,673) of the population.

Of the 16,497 households, 22.4% had children under the age of 18; 60.2% were married couples living together; 4.3% had a female householder with no husband present and 34.1% were non-families. Of all households, 31.1% were made up of individuals and 25.5% had someone living alone who was 65 years of age or older. The average household size was 2.32 and the average family size was 2.94.

18.9% of the population were under the age of 18, 4.6% from 18 to 24, 17.0% from 25 to 44, 24.8% from 45 to 64, and 34.8% who were 65 years of age or older. The median age was 53.2 years. For every 100 females, the population had 85.2 males. For every 100 females ages 18 and older there were 80.9 males.

The Census Bureau's 2006–2010 American Community Survey showed that (in 2010 inflation-adjusted dollars) median household income was $74,202 (with a margin of error of +/− $3,156) and the median family income was $99,727 (+/− $5,718). Males had a median income of $84,790 (+/− $4,546) versus $57,058 (+/− $4,789) for females. The per capita income for the borough was $41,959 (+/− $1,676). About 2.6% of families and 3.9% of the population were below the poverty line, including 3.9% of those under age 18 and 4.4% of those age 65 or over.

=== 2000 census ===
As of the 2000 United States census there were 27,999 people, 12,536 households, and 8,236 families residing in the township. The population density was 667.6 inhabitants per square mile (257.8/km^{2}). There were 13,259 housing units at an average density of 316.1 per square mile (122.0/km^{2}). The racial makeup of the township was 93.31% White, 2.93% African American, 0.06% Native American, 2.34% Asian, 0.09% Pacific Islander, 0.68% from other races, and 0.60% from two or more races. Hispanic or Latino of any race were 2.38% of the population.

There were 12,536 households, out of which 15.9% had children under the age of 18 living with them, 60.6% were married couples living together, 3.9% had a female householder with no husband present, and 34.3% were non-families. 32.0% of all households were made up of individuals, and 28.0% had someone living alone who was 65 years of age or older. The average household size was 2.15 and the average family size was 2.70.

In the township, the population was spread out, with 16.0% under the age of 18, 4.2% from 18 to 24, 16.3% from 25 to 44, 20.0% from 45 to 64, and 43.5% who were 65 years of age or older. The median age was 59 years. For every 100 females, there were 84.8 males. For every 100 females age 18 and over, there were 79.3 males.

The median income for a household in the township was $53,306, and the median income for a family was $68,479. Males had a median income of $56,431 versus $35,857 for females. The per capita income for the township was $31,772. About 1.3% of families and 3.3% of the population were below the poverty line, including 2.9% of those under age 18 and 3.0% of those age 65 or over.

== Education ==
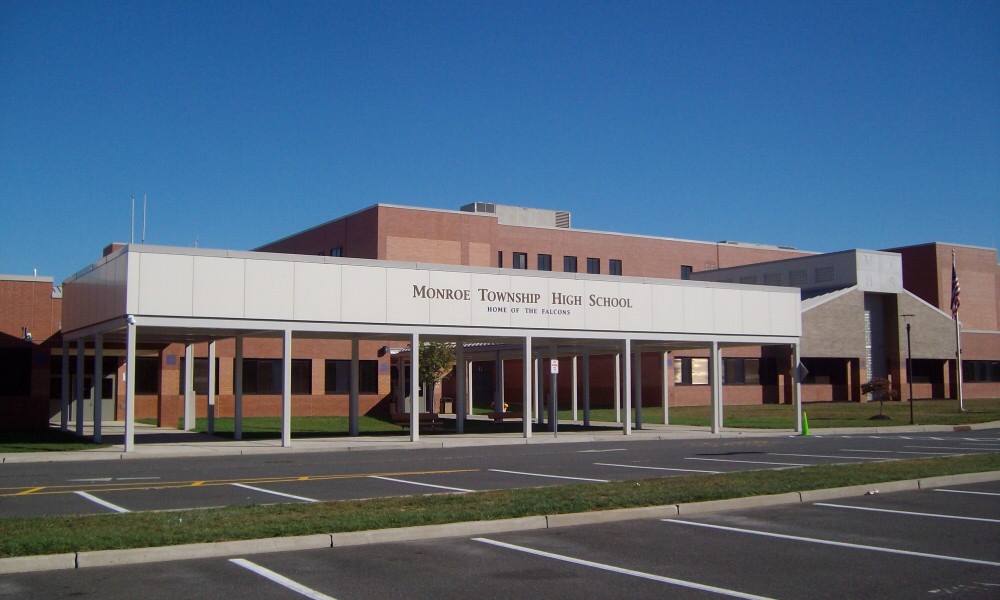
Monroe Township High School, located on the corner of Schoolhouse Road and Perrineville Road

The Monroe Township School District serves public school students in pre-kindergarten through twelfth grade. As of the 2023–24 school year, the district, comprised of eight schools, had an enrollment of 6,906 students and 546.3 classroom teachers (on an FTE basis), for a student–teacher ratio of 12.6:1. Schools in the district (with 2023–24 enrollment data from the National Center for Education Statistics) are Applegarth Elementary School with 442 students in grades 4–5, Barclay Brook Elementary School with 366 students in grades PreK–2, Brookside Elementary School with 406 students in grades 3–5, Mill Lake Elementary School with 479 students in grades PreK–2, Oak Tree Elementary School with 588 students in grades PreK–3, Woodland Elementary School with 252 students in grades 3–5, Monroe Township Middle School with 1,704 students in grades 6–8 and Monroe Township High School with 2,620 students in grades 9–12.

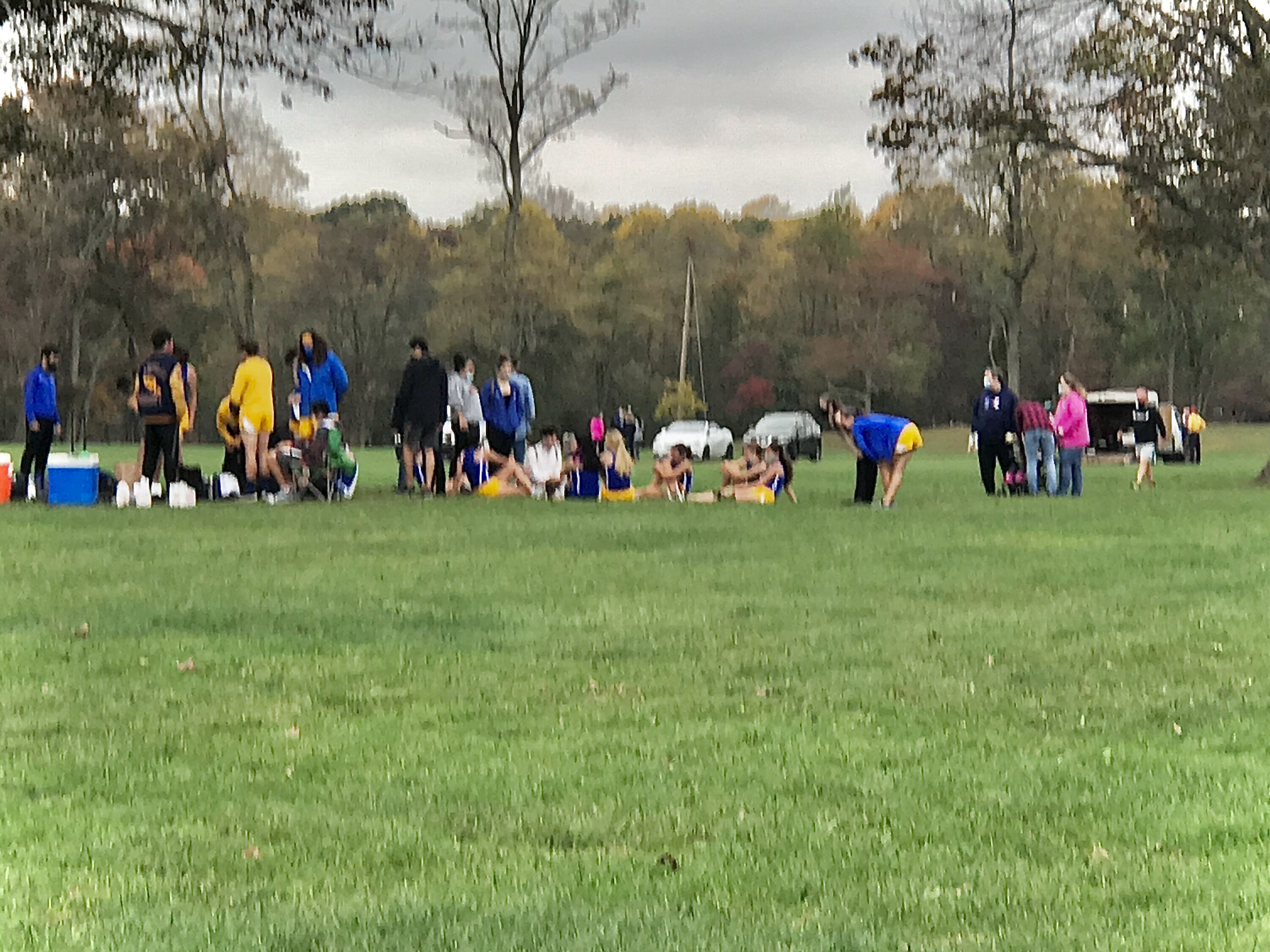
Youth of Monroe at a track and field competition

Thompson Park During the 1991–1992 academic school year, Mill Lake Elementary School received the National Blue Ribbon Award of Excellence from the United States Department of Education, the highest honor that an American school can achieve. This honor was followed during the 1998–1999 academic school year, to Barclay Brook Elementary School across town. Both of Monroe Township's Pre-K through third grade schools received the recognition.

About 300 students from Jamesburg attend Monroe Township High School as part of a sending/receiving relationship with the Jamesburg Public Schools that has been in effect since 1980.

Eighth grade students from all of Middlesex County are eligible to apply to attend the high school programs offered by the Middlesex County Magnet Schools, a county-wide vocational school district that offers full-time career and technical education at its schools in East Brunswick, Edison, Perth Amboy, Piscataway and Woodbridge Township, with no tuition charged to students for attendance.

Monroe Township is home to the Academy Learning Center, a private school that provides educational support for students with autism and other disabilities, ages 3 through 21.

== Sports ==
The township has three cricket fields, which host amateur leagues and tournaments. The township is the home of the United Cricket Club, which participates in the US Cricket League. In 2023, Monroe Township High School launched New Jersey's first ever high school cricket team.

== Parks and recreation ==
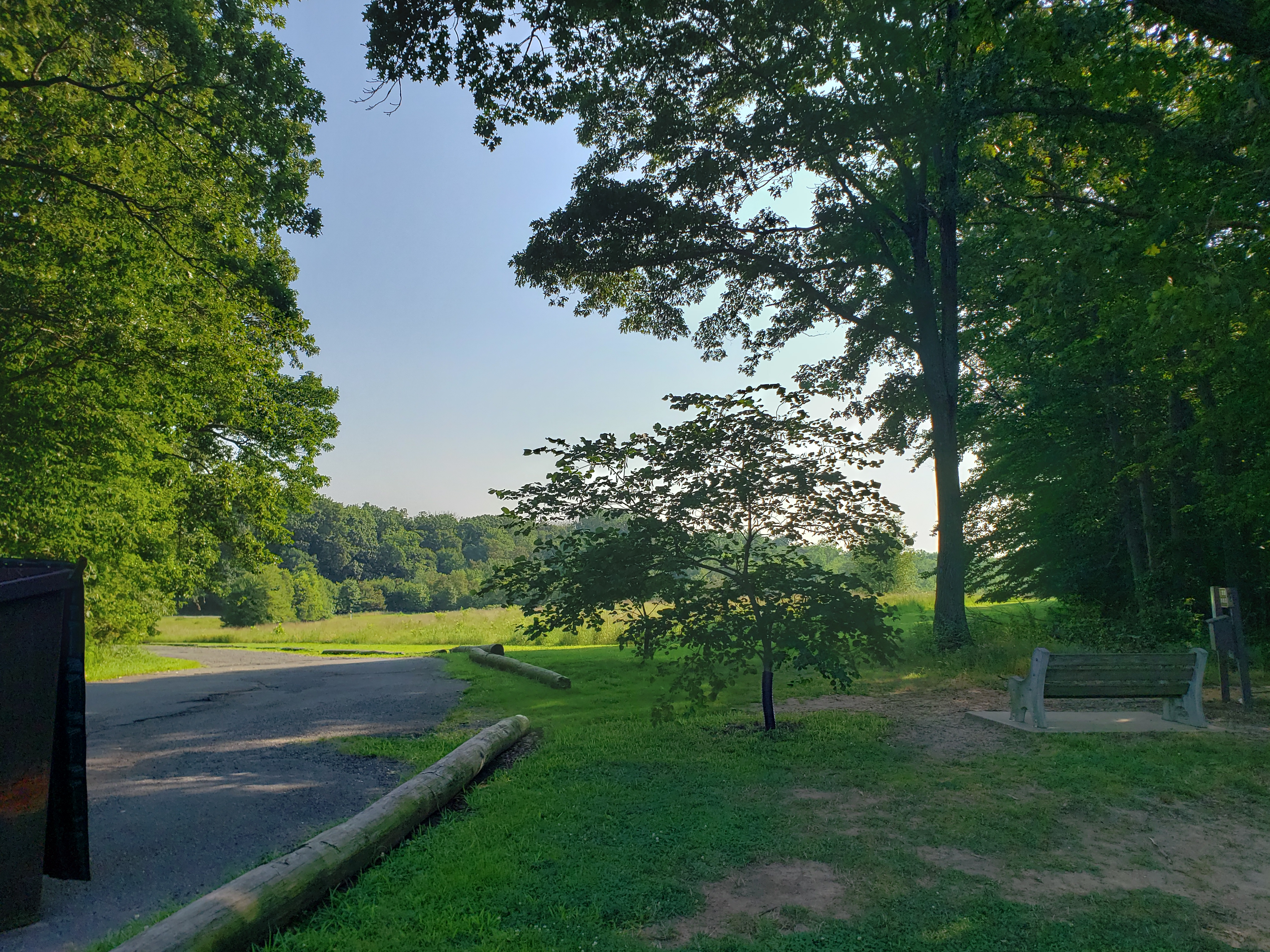
Thompson Park

Thompson Park is a 675-acre (273 ha) park, connected to sports fields operated by Monroe Township High School, and straddles both Monroe Township and Jamesburg. It is the largest park in the Middlesex County Park System, and features Lake Manalapan where people could fish (motorboats are not allowed on the lake, but rowing is permitted). The park also has its own dog park, various hiking trails, and a small fenced in zoo that has various native and exotic animals on display.

Other parks in the township include Veteran's Park Playground and Spray Park, James Monroe Memorial Park, Thomas L. Allen Softball Complex, Daniel P. Ryan Field, and Monroe Township Soccer Complex.

In 2023, Monroe Township started a park expansion plan that will last several years and is split up into multiple phases. Phase 1, which will last up until 2026, includes adding new pickleball and volleyball courts at the senior citizen center as well as at Patriot Park. Other locations that will have upgrades included in the first phase are the Monroe Township Community Garden and Veterans Park. Phase 2 will take 4–10 years, including renovations and adding new infrastructure such as parking lots and playgrounds.

== Government ==
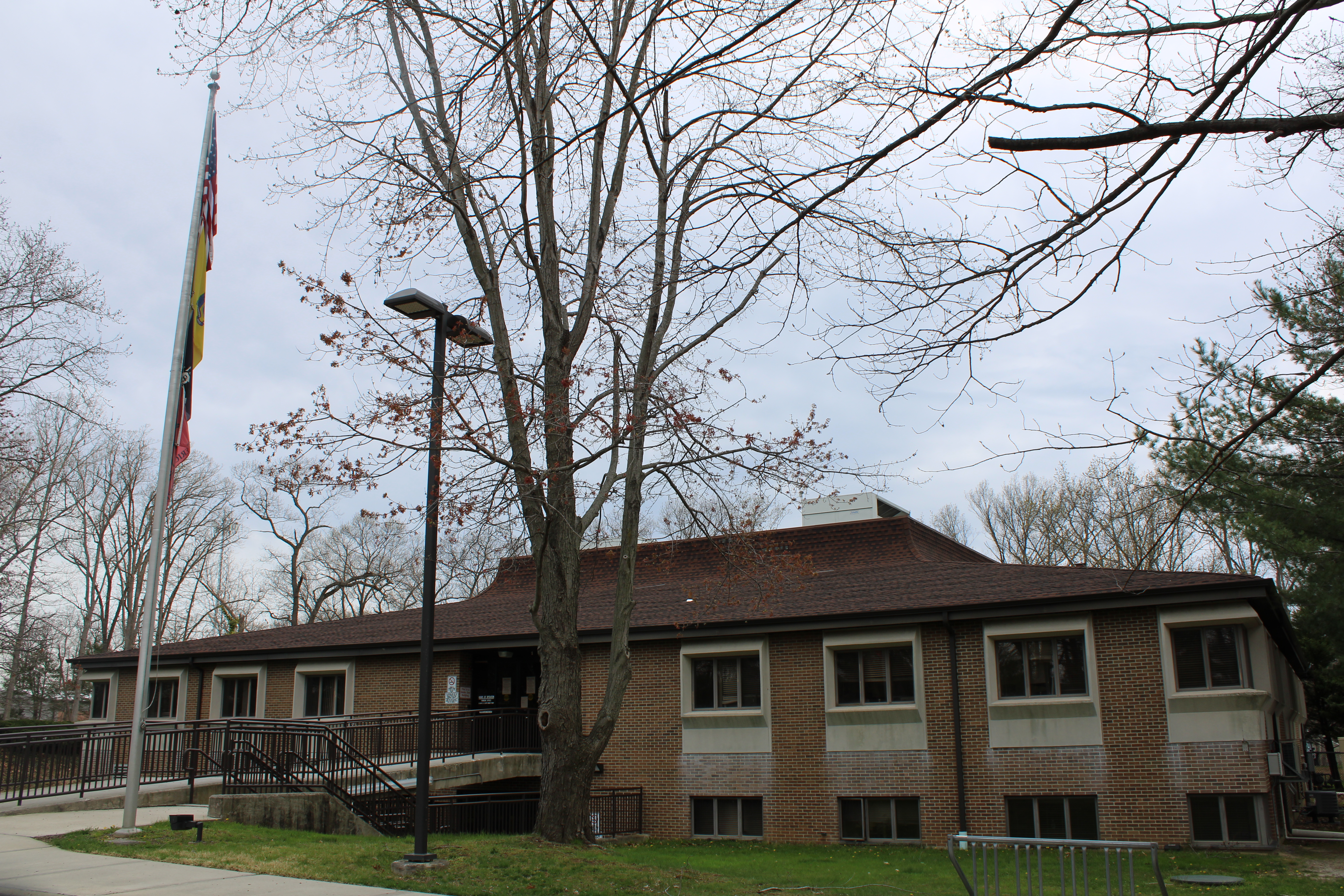
Monroe Township Municipal Complex

=== Local government ===
Monroe Township is governed within the Faulkner Act, formally known as the Optional Municipal Charter Law, under the Mayor-Council system of New Jersey municipal government. The township is one of 71 municipalities (of the 564) statewide governed under this form. The governing body is comprised of a directly-elected mayor and a five-member township council, all elected on a partisan basis in odd-numbered years as part of the November general election. There are three township council seats elected from wards, which come up for vote together, followed two years later by the two at-large seats and the mayoral seat.

As of 2026, the Mayor of Monroe Township is Democrat Stephen Dalina, who is serving a term of office ending December 31, 2027. Dalina had been appointed to office in 2021 and was elected for a full term in November 2023. Members of the Township Council are Council President Rupa P. Siegel (D, 2029; Ward 2), Vice President Michael A. Markel (D, 2029; Ward 1), Miriam Cohen (D, 2027; at-large), Charles G. Dipierro (R, 2029; Ward 3) and Terence G. Van Dzura (D, 2027; at-large).

In January 2021, the Township Council selected councilmember Stephen Dalina from a list of three candidates nominated to fill the seat as mayor expiring in December 2023 that became vacant following the death of Gerald Tamburro the previous month. In February 2021, Terence Van Dzura was selected from the three candidates nominated to fill the at-large seat expiring in December 2023 that had been held by Dalina until he took office as mayor. Dalina and Van Dzura served on an interim basis until the November 2021 general election, when they were elected to serve the balance of the term of office.

In March 2017, the Township Council selected Miriam Cohen from a list of three candidates nominated by the Democratic municipal committee to fill the seat expiring in December 2019 that was vacated the previous month by Leslie Koppel when she took office on the Middlesex County Board of Chosen Freeholders. In November 2017, Cohen was elected to serve the balance of the term of office.

In January 2016, the Township Council appointed Blaise Dipierro to fill the Second Ward seat expiring in December 2017 that had been held by Gerald W. Tamburro until he stepped down to take office as mayor; Dipierro will serve on an interim basis until the November 2016 general election, when voters will choose a candidate to serve the balance of the term of office.

The New Jersey Juvenile Justice Commission operates the New Jersey Training School, a juvenile detention center for boys, in the township. In 2018, the state approved funding to close the two Civil War-era youth prisons in New Jersey. It has not been decided yet what will be done with the property after its closure.

=== Federal, state and county representation ===
Monroe Township is located in the 12th Congressional District and is part of New Jersey's 14th state legislative district.

For the 119th United States Congress, New Jersey's 12th congressional district is represented by Bonnie Watson Coleman (D, Ewing Township). New Jersey is represented in the United States Senate by Democrats Cory Booker (Newark, term ends 2027) and Andy Kim (Moorestown, term ends 2031).

For the 2026–2027 session, the 14th legislative district of the New Jersey Legislature is represented in the State Senate by Linda R. Greenstein (D, Plainsboro Township) and in the General Assembly by Wayne DeAngelo (D, Hamilton Township) and Tennille McCoy (D, Hamilton Township).

Middlesex County is governed by a Board of County Commissioners, whose seven members are elected at-large on a partisan basis to serve three-year terms of office on a staggered basis, with either two or three seats coming up for election each year as part of the November general election. At an annual reorganization meeting held in January, the board selects from among its members a commissioner director and deputy director. As of 2025, Middlesex County's Commissioners (with party affiliation, term-end year, and residence listed in parentheses) are:

Director Ronald G. Rios (D, Carteret, 2027), Deputy Director Shanti Narra (D, North Brunswick, 2027), Claribel A. "Clary" Azcona-Barber (D, New Brunswick, 2025), Charles Kenny (D, Woodbridge Township, 2025), Leslie Koppel (D, Monroe Township, 2026), Chanelle Scott McCullum (D, Piscataway, 2025) and Charles E. Tomaro (D, Edison, 2026).

Constitutional officers are: Clerk Nancy Pinkin (D, 2025, East Brunswick), Sheriff Mildred S. Scott (D, 2025, Piscataway) and Surrogate Claribel Cortes (D, 2026; North Brunswick).

=== Politics ===
As of March 2011, there were a total of 29,992 registered voters in Monroe Township, of which 11,616 (38.7%) were registered as Democrats, 5,448 (18.2%) were registered as Republicans and 12,912 (43.1%) were registered as Unaffiliated. There were 16 voters registered as either Libertarians or Greens.

United States presidential election results for Monroe Township
Year	Republican		Democratic		Third party(ies)	
Year	No.	%	No.	%	No.	%
2024	15,394	48.20%	15,942	49.92%	600	1.88%
2020	13,841	45.10%	16,593	54.06%	257	0.84%
2016	11,956	46.66%	13,147	51.31%	518	2.02%
2012	10,361	45.76%	12,113	53.50%	166	0.73%
2008	10,150	44.84%	12,319	54.42%	169	0.75%
2004	8,806	43.44%	11,363	56.05%	103	0.51%
2000	5,461	33.29%	10,534	64.21%	411	2.51%

In the 2012 presidential election, Democrat Barack Obama received 53.5% of the vote (12,113 cast), ahead of Republican Mitt Romney with 45.8% (10,361 votes), and other candidates with 0.7% (166 votes), among the 22,840 ballots cast by the township's 31,297 registered voters (200 ballots were spoiled), for a turnout of 73.0%. In the 2008 presidential election, Democrat Barack Obama received 53.9% of the vote (12,319 cast), ahead of Republican John McCain with 44.4% (10,150 votes) and other candidates with 0.7% (169 votes), among the 22,875 ballots cast by the township's 29,295 registered voters, for a turnout of 78.1%. In the 2004 presidential election, Democrat John Kerry received 55.7% of the vote (11,363 ballots cast), outpolling Republican George W. Bush with 43.2% (8,806 votes) and other candidates with 0.4% (103 votes), among the 20,405 ballots cast by the township's 25,675 registered voters, for a turnout percentage of 79.5.

Gubernatorial election results for Monroe Township
Year	Republican		Democratic		Third party(ies)	
Year	No.	%	No.	%	No.	%
2025	11,639	44.79%	14,204	54.66%	145	0.56%
2021	10,209	47.64%	11,077	51.69%	145	0.68%
2017	7,982	48.91%	8,066	49.42%	272	1.67%
2013	10,209	64.03%	5,605	35.15%	131	0.82%
2009	8,292	48.41%	7,785	45.45%	1,050	6.13%
2005	6,111	39.15%	9,028	57.83%	472	3.02%

In the 2013 gubernatorial election, Republican Chris Christie received 64.0% of the vote (10,209 cast), ahead of Democrat Barbara Buono with 35.2% (5,605 votes), and other candidates with 0.8% (131 votes), among the 16,180 ballots cast by the township's 31,967 registered voters (235 ballots were spoiled), for a turnout of 50.6%. In the 2009 gubernatorial election, Republican Chris Christie received 48.0% of the vote (8,292 ballots cast), ahead of Democrat Jon Corzine with 45.1% (7,785 votes), Independent Chris Daggett with 5.5% (948 votes) and other candidates with 0.6% (102 votes), among the 17,277 ballots cast by the township's 29,164 registered voters, yielding a 59.2% turnout.

United States Senate election results for Monroe Township1
Year	Republican		Democratic		Third party(ies)	
Year	No.	%	No.	%	No.	%
2024	14,425	46.92%	15,679	50.99%	643	2.09%
2018	10,614	47.57%	11,159	50.01%	539	2.42%
2012	9,583	44.75%	11,528	53.83%	305	1.42%
2006	5,590	37.73%	8,939	60.34%	285	1.92%

United States Senate election results for Monroe Township2
Year	Republican		Democratic		Third party(ies)	
Year	No.	%	No.	%	No.	%
2020	13,729	45.61%	15,896	52.81%	476	1.58%
2014	5,759	44.35%	7,082	54.54%	145	1.12%
2013	4,785	43.95%	6,012	55.22%	90	0.83%
2008	9,418	44.20%	11,593	54.40%	298	1.40%

== Infrastructure ==
=== Transportation ===
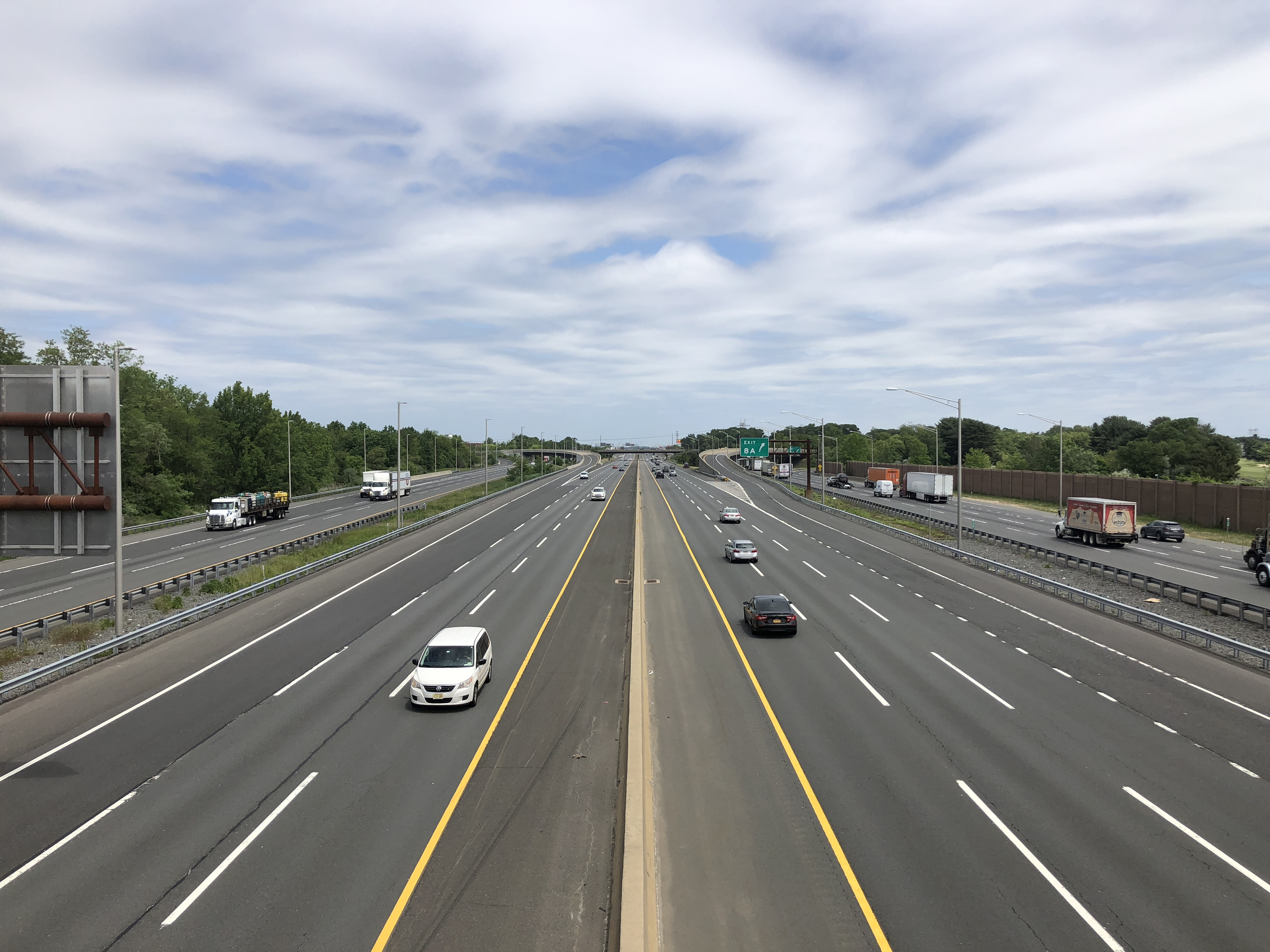
View north along the 12-lane New Jersey Turnpike (Interstate 95) in Monroe Township

==== Roads and highways ====
As of May 2010, the township had a total of 175.97 miles (283.20 km) of roadways, of which 138.33 miles (222.62 km) were maintained by the municipality, 33.78 miles (54.36 km) by Middlesex County and 2.52 miles (4.06 km) by the New Jersey Department of Transportation and 1.34 miles (2.16 km) by the New Jersey Turnpike Authority.

Major highways serving Monroe Township include the New Jersey Turnpike (Interstate 95), Route 32 and Route 33. Exit 8A of the Turnpike is located on the western edge of Monroe Township, with a nine-lane toll gate featuring a "modified" double trumpet interchange (with a few ramps continuing into South Brunswick). A number of county routes pass through Monroe Township, including County Route 535, County Route 527, County Route 522, County Route 625, County Route 619, County Route 615, County Route 614, County Route 613 and County Route 612.

Other limited-access roads that are accessible outside the municipality include Interstate 195 in neighboring Millstone Township and the Garden State Parkway in bordering Old Bridge Township.

The New Jersey Turnpike Authority had proposed to build two roads that were to pass through Monroe. The first was the Driscoll Expressway which was to start from the Garden State Parkway at exit 80 in South Toms River and end three miles (4.8 km) north of exit 8A along the turnpike in South Brunswick. This project was terminated in the 1980s. The other was a west–east spur, Route 92. It would have started at U.S. Route 1 just north of the intersection with Ridge Road in South Brunswick and ended at the Exit 8A toll gate in Monroe Township. However, this was cancelled on December 1, 2006, and the Authority instead focused on the turnpike widening between Exit 6 and Exit 8A.

==== Public transportation ====
===== Rail =====
In the 19th and 20th centuries, Jamesburg and Monroe Township had a major railway in the area, which was the Freehold and Jamesburg Agricultural Railroad. This railway was owned and operated by the Camden & Amboy Railroad Company. Surveying for the line began on September 8, 1851, grading began on October 19, 1852, and the first track was laid on April 4, 1853. The first section of line was opened on July 18, 1853. The establishment of the Freehold & Jamesburg Agricultural Railroad caused this region to become a transportation hub. The Freehold and Jamesburg Railroad was abandoned by the early 1930s. A 2.8-mile-long (4.5 km) portion of the former railroad's right-of-way was later approved to be sold by the New Jersey Board of Public Utility Commissioners to Jersey Central Power & Light Company in 1966, with occasional freight service still being utilized through the Freehold Industrial Track.

The Monmouth Ocean Middlesex Line is a proposal by New Jersey Transit to restore passenger railway service to the region, by utilizing the same tracks as the Freehold Industrial Track. Jamesburg would be a potential railway stop on the proposed 'MOM' Line.

The nearest train stations to the Monroe area are located at Metuchen, New Brunswick, and Princeton Junction, all along on the Northeast Corridor Line.

===== Bus =====
NJ Transit provides bus service to the Port Authority Bus Terminal in Midtown Manhattan on the 138 and 139 routes. Coach USA Suburban Transit and Academy Bus Lines provide weekday commuter service to PABT and to Wall Street.

Middlesex County Area Transit shuttles provide weekday service to and from Monroe on routes operating across the county. The M1 route operates between Jamesburg and the New Brunswick train station, and the M2 route (suspended during the COVID-19 pandemic) connects Jamesburg, Helmetta and Spotswood with East Brunswick, including the Brunswick Square Mall.

=== Healthcare ===
Monroe Township is served by CentraState Healthcare System. Located in neighboring Freehold Township, the 287-bed hospital is a partner of Atlantic Health System and is affiliated with Rutgers Robert Wood Johnson Medical School. CentraState Healthcare system also provides healthcare through its various family practices in communities across western Monmouth and southern Middlesex counties in central New Jersey. One of those six family practices has an office located in Monroe Township.

The next closest hospitals to the township are Penn Medicine Princeton Medical Center in nearby Plainsboro Township, the Old Bridge Division of Raritan Bay Medical Center in nearby Old Bridge Township, and Saint Peter's University Hospital and Robert Wood Johnson University Hospital in nearby New Brunswick.

== Notable people ==
People who were born in, residents of, or otherwise closely associated with Monroe Township include:

- Raymond Arvidson, planetary scientist best known for his contributions to NASA missions to Mars, including as deputy director of the Mars Exploration Rovers
- Randy Beverly (born 1944), cornerback for the New York Jets best known for making two key interceptions that helped the Jets to their historic victory in Super Bowl III in 1969
- Irene Craigmile Bolam (1904–1982), subject of a 1970 book which claimed that she was Amelia Earhart
- Craig Carpenito (born 1973), former United States Attorney for the District of New Jersey
- Nick Dini (born 1993), catcher who played in MLB for the Kansas City Royals
- AJ Gracia (born 2004), college baseball outfielder for the Virginia Cavaliers
- Peter P. Garibaldi (1931–2023), politician who served as mayor of Monroe Township, in the New Jersey General Assembly from 1968 to 1974 and in the New Jersey Senate from 1984 to 1988
- Ben-Ami Kadish (1923–2012), former U.S. Army mechanical engineer who pleaded guilty in December 2008 to being an "unregistered agent for Israel" during the 1980s
- Leon Klenicki (1930–2009), rabbi who was an advocate for interfaith relations, particularly between Jews and Catholics
- Leonard Leo (born 1965), lawyer and conservative legal activist who was the longtime vice president of the Federalist Society
- Sophie Lutterlough (1910–2009), entomologist at the Smithsonian National Museum of Natural History
- Dave Meads (born 1964), former MLB relief pitcher who played for the Houston Astros
- Antonio Pierce (born 1978), former Pro Bowl linebacker who played in the NFL for the New York Giants and was head coach for the Las Vegas Raiders
- Frank J. Pino (1909–2007), lawyer and politician
- Gordon Ryan (born 1995), submission wrestler and Brazilian jiu-jitsu black belt
- Brianna Schnorrbusch (born 2006), snowboarder specializing in snowboard cross who represented the United States at the 2026 Winter Olympics
- Edwin Stern (born 1941), lawyer and judge who served as an acting justice on the New Jersey Supreme Court

== See also ==
- Applegarth, New Jersey
- Clearbrook Park, New Jersey
- Concordia, New Jersey
- Greenbriar at Whittingham, New Jersey
- Regency at Monroe, New Jersey
- Rossmoor, New Jersey
- Stonebridge, New Jersey
- The Ponds, New Jersey
