= Applegarth, New Jersey =

Populated place in Middlesex County, New Jersey, US

- Unincorporated community
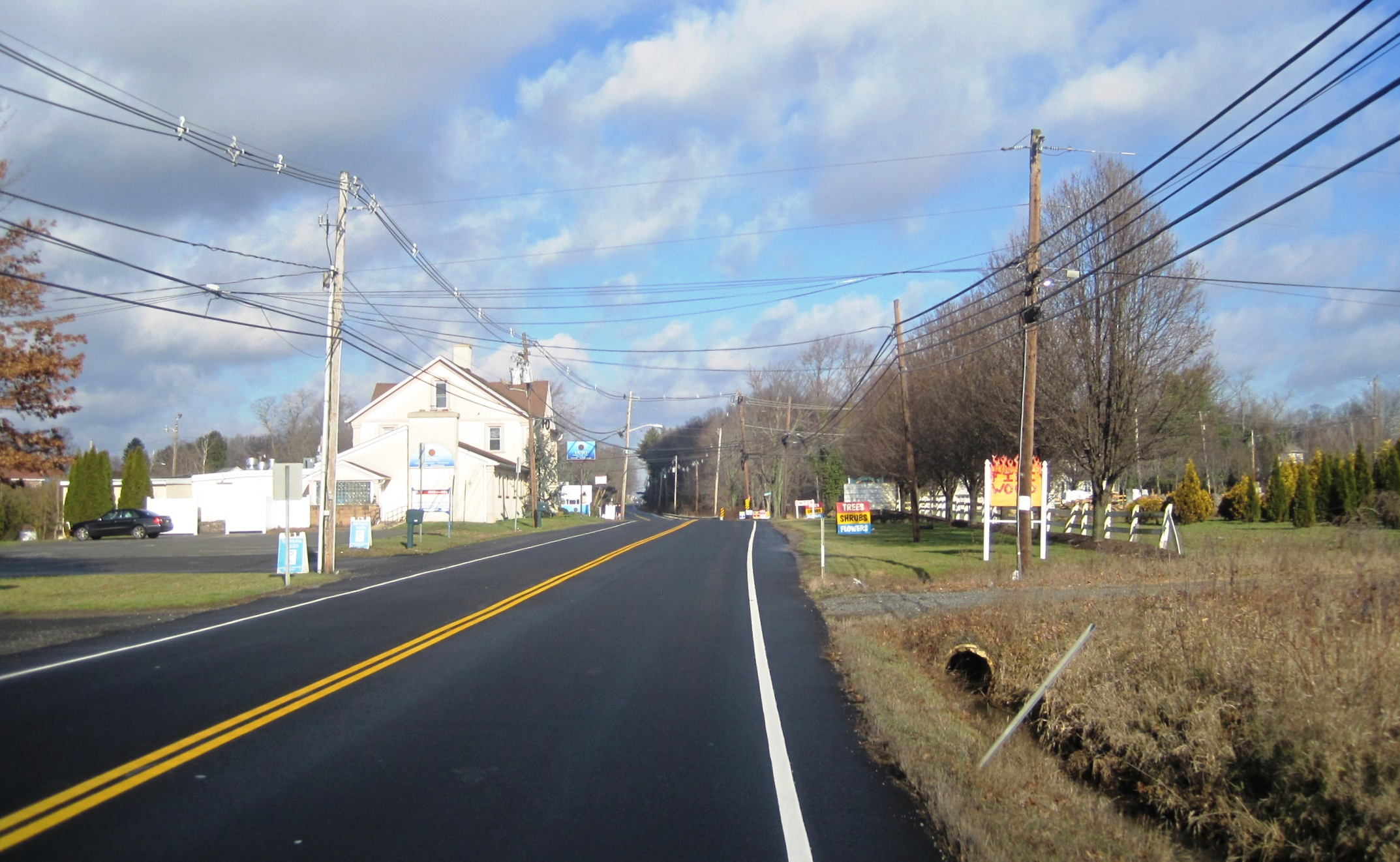
- Looking north along Applegarth Road (CR 619)

- Location in Middlesex County Location in New Jersey Location in the United States
- Coordinates: 40°16′42″N 74°28′22″W
- Country: United States
- State: New Jersey
- County: Middlesex
- Township: Monroe
- Elevation: 105 ft (32 m)
- GNIS feature ID: 874361

Applegarth is an unincorporated community located within Monroe Township in Middlesex County, in the U.S. state of New Jersey. The settlement is located in the southern portion of the township and is traversed by the road of the same name, Applegarth Road (CR 619). At the location of the original settlement, at the intersection of Applegarth, Wycoffs Mills, and Old Church Roads, there is a restaurant, farmland, and the Applegarth Fire Department. Further north along Applegarth Road are housing developments, age-restricted communities, and two elementary schools: Applegarth and Oak Tree.
