= Bloch Brothers Tobacco Company =

American tobacco company

Coordinates: 40°2′32″N 80°43′35″W

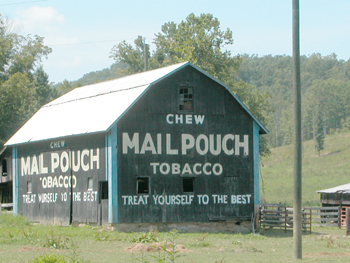
- Industry: Tobacco
- Founded: 1879
- Headquarters: Wheeling, West Virginia
- Key people: Aaron Bloch, Samuel Bloch
- Products: Mail Pouch chewing tobacco

Headquarters building of Bloch Brothers Tobacco Company, Wheeling, West Virginia

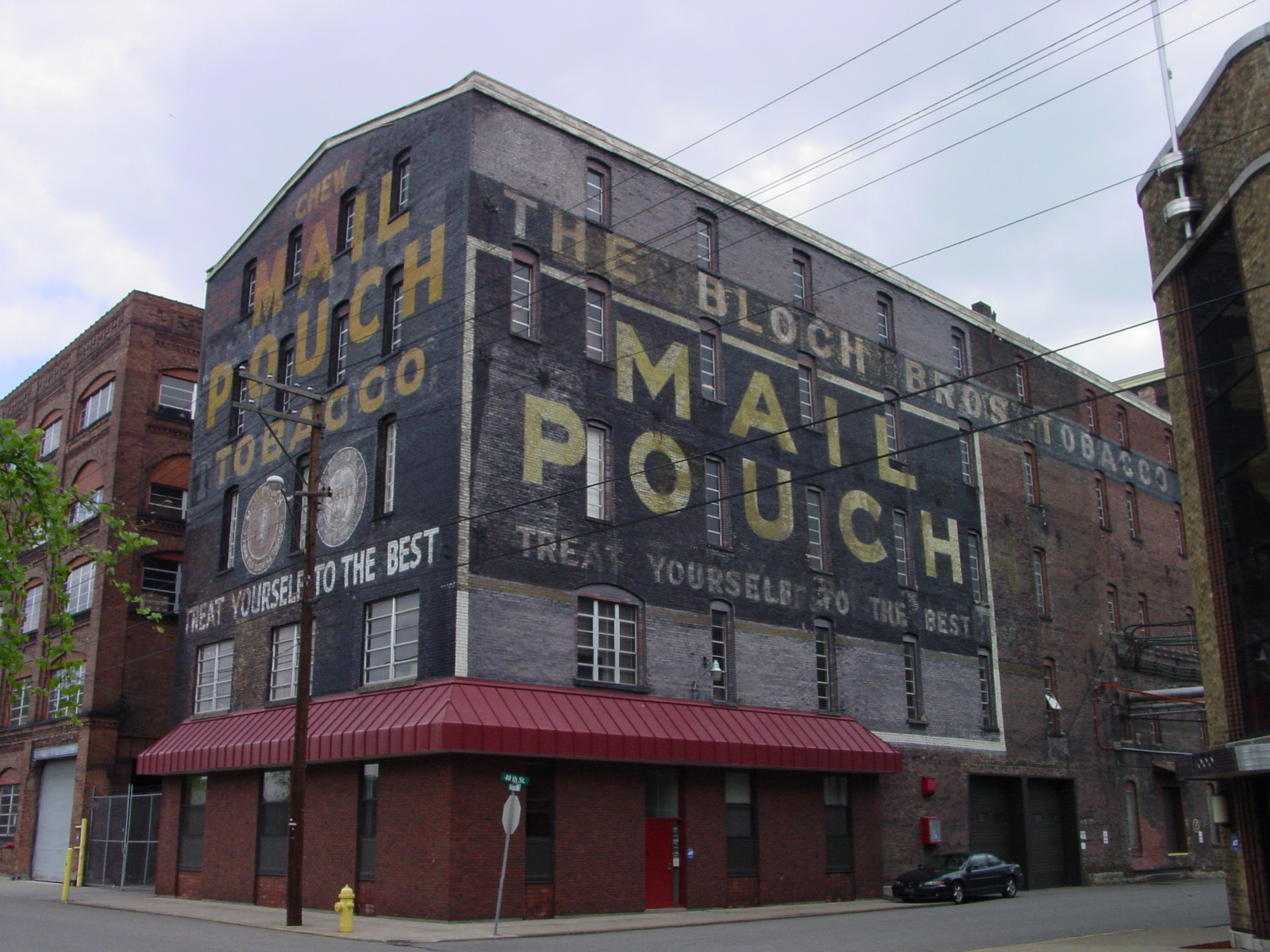
Fading Mail Pouch ad on factory building adjacent to former Bloch Brothers works

The Bloch Brothers Tobacco Company (formerly the Helme Tobacco Company) of Wheeling, West Virginia, was a tobacco company founded by brothers Aaron and Samuel Bloch in 1879. It was best known for its Mail Pouch chewing tobacco. Mail Pouch was a popular chew advertised on over 20,000 barns, many located in the rural Ohio River Valley. Each barn had an end or side painted with the familiar Mail Pouch lettering and advertising, "Treat yourself to the best."

The brothers began manufacturing cigars in 1879 as a side-line to Samuel Bloch's wholesale grocery business. It was discovered that the left-over cigar clippings could be flavored and packaged in a paper bag, and then sold. Mail Pouch chewing tobacco is still produced by Swisher International Group.

== See also ==
- George Washington Helme
- G. W. Helme Snuff Mill Historic District, New Jersey
- List of historic sites in Ohio County, West Virginia
- Mail Pouch Tobacco Barn
