= John Warne Herbert Jr. =

American football player (1853–1934)

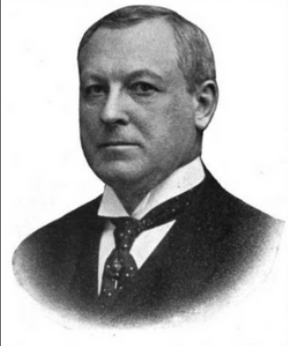
- Class: 1872

Personal information
- Born: August 3, 1853; Wickatunk, Marlboro Township, New Jersey, U.S.
- Died: August 26, 1934 (aged 81); Manhattan, New York

Career information
- High school: Glenwood Institute
- College: Rutgers University (1869–1872) Columbia Law School

Other information

Mayor of Helmetta, New Jersey
- In office 1890–1902

Chairman/Head of the State Highway Commission of New Jersey
- In office 1917–1920
- Preceded by: Col. Edwin Augustus Stevens Jr. (Public Roads Commissioner)
- Succeeded by: George L. Burton

Personal details
- Party: Republican

John Warne Herbert Jr. (August 3, 1853 – August 26, 1934) was an American lawyer who was a member of the Rutgers team in the first ever college football game. He was the chairman of the State Highway Commission of New Jersey and mayor of Helmetta, New Jersey.

== Early life and education ==
Herbert was born on August 3, 1853, in Wickatunk, New Jersey. He is the son of John Warne Herbert Sr. and Agnes D. Runyon Herbert. John Warne Herbert Jr. went to the Old Brick Reformed Church Schoolhouse in Marlboro, New Jersey and the Glenwood Institute in Matawan, New Jersey.

== Rutgers ==
He enrolled at Rutgers University in the scientific department, then known as Rutgers College in 1869 and graduated with an Bachelor's of Science degree in 1872. Herbert played in the first ever college football game as a member of the Rutgers football team, on November 6, 1869. He was the youngest member of the team, being only 16 years old at the time.

Years later, Herbert wrote about the game:

To appreciate this game to the full you must know something of its background," (...) "The two colleges were, and still are, of course, about 20 miles apart. The rivalry between them was intense. For years each had striven for possession of an old Revolutionary cannon, making night forays and lugging it back and forth time and again. Not long before the first football game, the canny Princetonians had settled this competition in their own favor by ignominiously sinking the gun in several feet of concrete. In addition to this, I regret to report, Princeton had beaten Rutgers in baseball by the harrowing score of 40-2. Rutgers longed for a chance to square things."

— Rutgers' John W. Herbert, 1933

He was a trustee at Rutgers from 1901 until his death in 1934. He was the head of the Rutgers Alumni Association from 1930 to 1932. He was also commissioner of the New Jersey Agricultural College, which became part of Rutgers and was renamed Cook College.

== Career ==
=== Legal career ===
After graduating from college in 1872 with a Bachelor's of Science degree, he worked as a civil engineer. As he grew tired of being a civil engineer, he pursued his legal education. He studied law under Captain Albert S. Cloke, in Jersey City, New Jersey. He then studied law for two years at Columbia Law School in Lower Manhattan, New York and graduated with an L.L.B. in 1876. He had a successful career as a trial lawyer for 13 years.

=== George W. Helme Tobacco Company ===
In 1889, he gave up his law practice to become vice-president and treasurer of the George W. Helme Company at Helmetta, New Jersey. He was the director of the snuff mill owned by his father-in-law, George Washington Helme. The snuff mill is part of the G.W. Helme Snuff Mill Historic District. The Helme Tobacco Company is now part of Swisher International.

=== Career in government ===
He was elected mayor of Helmetta, New Jersey and served from 1890 to 1902. In 1896, he was elected as a delegate to the National Republican Convention and helped elect President William McKinley and Vice President Garret Hobart, his former teacher at the Glenwood Institute. He was an elector-at-large in the Harding-Coolidge campaign in 1920. In 1916, he was appointed by Governor James Fielder as a member of the Commission of Good Road Legislation of New Jersey. Later he was the chairman of the Commission of Good Road Legislation of New Jersey.

On March 3, 1917, New Jersey created a state Highway Department to be governed by an eight-member State Highway Commission, to be led by a chairman. On March 14, 1917, Governor Walter E. Edge appointed Herbert to the State Highway Commission of New Jersey as the first chairman of the board under the new Act. He was the chairman of the State Highway Commission of New Jersey from 1917 to 1920. In 1935, New Jersey reduced the eight-member commission down to a single commissioner and the commissioner system is still in place today. Part of U.S. Route 1 was named "Herbert's Highway" in his honor.

In 1920, he ran as a Republican for the 67th United States Congress in the New Jersey's 3rd congressional district, but lost in the primaries to T. Frank Appleby.

=== Railroad and other endeavors ===
In 1900, he became interested in railroad properties and resigned from the George W. Helme Company to assume the presidency of the Niagara, St. Catherines and Toronto Railroad Co. and the vice presidency of the Hudson Valley Railroad Co. He was an officer in the Freehold and Jamesburg Agricultural Railroad, the Tanana Valley Railroad Company and the Texas and Pacific Coal Company. He was the first vice president of the Hudson Valley Railway Company, and several other corporations.

He was the head of the Herbert Oil Company, which his son later took over. He was the president of the People's Realty Company. Additionally, he was a director at IBM, the Union Dye and Electric Company, the Colonial Life Insurance Company of America, the Columbia Gas and Electric Company, the American LaFrance Fire Engine Company, and the Computer-Tabulating-Recording Company.

== Personal life ==
=== Family ===
On November 10, 1885, he married Olivia "Etta" Antoinette, the daughter of George Washington Helme, the founder of the borough of Helmetta, New Jersey, at St. John's Episcopal Church in Jersey City, New Jersey. The borough was named after his wife, being a combination of her surname, 'Helme,' and her nickname, 'Etta'.

They had three children, two sons and a daughter. Their son, Captain John Warne Herbert III, was the vice president of the Herbert Oil Company in Fort Worth, Texas and was killed in action in 1942, during World War II. Their first son, John Oliver Herbert, died of appendicitis, in 1897. Their daughter, Grace P. Herbert Dunn, predeceased Herbert. His father was an associate judge of the Court of Common Pleas of Monmouth County, a two-time Republican National Convention delegate, and a member of the Monmouth County Tax Board. He was the first Freeholder of Marlboro and was instrumental in establishing the town and helping it separate from Freehold Township, New Jersey on February 17, 1848.

His ancestor was purportedly Francis Herbert, came to America in 1665 and was the first surveyor in New Jersey. His ancestors also include Philip Herbert, 4th Earl of Pembroke (although that is disputed in some genealogies) and Sir Thomas Warne, one of the first land owners in East Jersey.

=== Death ===
In August 1934, Herbert celebrated his birthday by playing 36 holes of golf. He developed a blister on one foot and an attendant suggested he get it looked at. Herbert scoffed at the suggestion. Three weeks later he was undergoing an operation for blood poisoning at Doctors Hospital in Manhattan and was to have his legs removed. On August 26, 1934, he died as a result of the operation. He was buried in Sleepy Hollow Cemetery.

The 1935 edition of the Scarlet Letter, the Rutgers University yearbook, was dedicated to Herbert. The Dedication page read, "To the memory of John Warne Herbert, member of the class of 1872 and participant in the first intercollegiate football game, trustee and devoted alumnus, a leader among men, loved by his fellows, and a Rutgers man who served his Alma Mater loyally, the Scarlet Letter of the Class of 1935 is affectionately and humbly dedicated."

=== Golf ===
Herbert was an avid golfer, being a member of at least three different golf clubs and an underwriter and founding member of Augusta National Golf Club. In 1934, the Club organized the inaugural Augusta National Invitation Tournament played on March 22-25, 1934, which became known as “The Masters.” He was a member of at least four golf clubs including the Augusta National Golf Club, Sleepy Hollow Country Club, Oakland Golf Club, and the Maidstone Golf Club.

Clifford Roberts remembered Herbert from meeting him at the Maidstone Golf Club in East Hampton, Long Island and described him as a "remarkably strong man both physically and mentally.” The two reconnected after Herbert bought his winter home in Augusta. Roberts, with famed golfer Bobby Jones and course designer Alister MacKenzie, created the Augusta National Golf Club which is considered to be the number one ranked golf course by Golf Digest and the golf community as a whole. Even though he never held a position, Herbert's fellow golfers at Augusta National referred to him as "the Judge."

=== Other personal endeavors ===
He was a member of the Lawyers' Club and Union League Club of New York. He was a junior warden of the St. George Episcopal Church in Helmetta and a senior warden at Saint Stephen's Episcopal Church in Manhattan.

== Houses ==
Herbert had homes in Manhattan; Augusta, Georgia; and Helmetta, New Jersey. His Helmetta and Augusta properties are his most notable. His New York residence was at the St. Regis New York, a luxury hotel.

=== Salubrity Hall ===
Herbert's home in Augusta's Summerville Historic District was known as "Salubrity Hall." It was an 11,000 sq. ft. mansion, built in 1928 and designed by architectural firm, Scroggs and Ewing, in the style of an English Tudor country house. The name was taken from ''Mont Salubrity,'' an all-girls school which had been on the estate and owned by Lord Thomas Sandwich. Thomas Sandwich and his wife named the property Salubrity due to the sand hills nearby.

The home located at 2259 Cumming Road, has 12 bedrooms, eight-and-a-half baths, 16th-century stained glass, and a Celtic fireplace. It was designed by architects Philander P. Scroggs and Whitley L. Ewing. The house is located within walking distance of Augusta Country Club. The house sits on a three acre lot which also contains a three-bedroom carriage house with five bays, a small one-bedroom cottage and extensive gardens planned by Etta Herbert. Both the house and gardens became a local attraction in Augusta and were featured on various postcards in the 1930s.

Etta Herbert orchestrated an exquisite landscape and garden on the estate, which had become a favorite of the Garden Club of Augusta during the Herberts time owning the property. The gardens of Salubrity Hall and its Tea House were both included in the books, Garden History of Georgia, 1733–1933 and Seeking Eden: A Collection of Georgia's Historic Gardens. She purchased another historic home in the area which was in danger of being demolished, the Ware-Sibley-Clark House, and donated it to the Augusta Art club in memory of the Herberts' daughter, Gertrude Herbert Dunn, who died in 1933. The name of the house was changed to the Gertrude Herbert Institute of Art and it remains a non-profit art school in Augusta.

Prior to moving into Salubrity Hall, the Herberts wintered in other Augusta places including the Hampton Terrace; the Sun Glow Cottage; and the historic Bon Air Hotel. Historic Augusta, Inc. gave the tea house the 2010 Preservation Award. It is a contributing property to the Summerville Historic District, a registered historic district by the National Register of Historic Places.

=== Helme-Herbert House ===
The family home of John and Etta Herbert, known as the Helme-Herbert House has a historic legacy. The three-story Victorian mansion in Helmetta, New Jersey was built in the 1880s. In 1905, they loaned the home to millionaire publisher, Bernarr Macfadden, for a project called Physical Culture City, which he promoted in his magazine, Physical Culture. Physical Culture City was to be a way to promote the lifestyle of exercise, healthy eating, and time outdoors. He called the house, Williams Health Home. The project was completed by 1907.

In 1935, after John's death, Etta donated the home to the Episcopal Church and it was renamed Christ Church Home. It was used as a haven for homeless girls. After the closure of the home in 1945, it became a convent for the Episcopal nuns of the Order of St. Helena. Etta had been a member of the St. George Episcopal Church in Helmetta since 1895. The Helme Tobacco Company purchased the home in 1962, to be used as a residence for the mill workers and for storage purposes. It was sold again in the 1980s and used as a private residence until it was demolished in 2024.

Before its demise, the Helme-Herbert House was part of the G.W. Helme Snuff Mill Historic District. The district is listed on the United States National Register of Historic Places and the New Jersey Register of Historic Places. It was the last of the three historic Helme family mansions in Helmetta to be destroyed.
