= Mail Pouch Tobacco barn =

Barn painted with an advertisement on its side

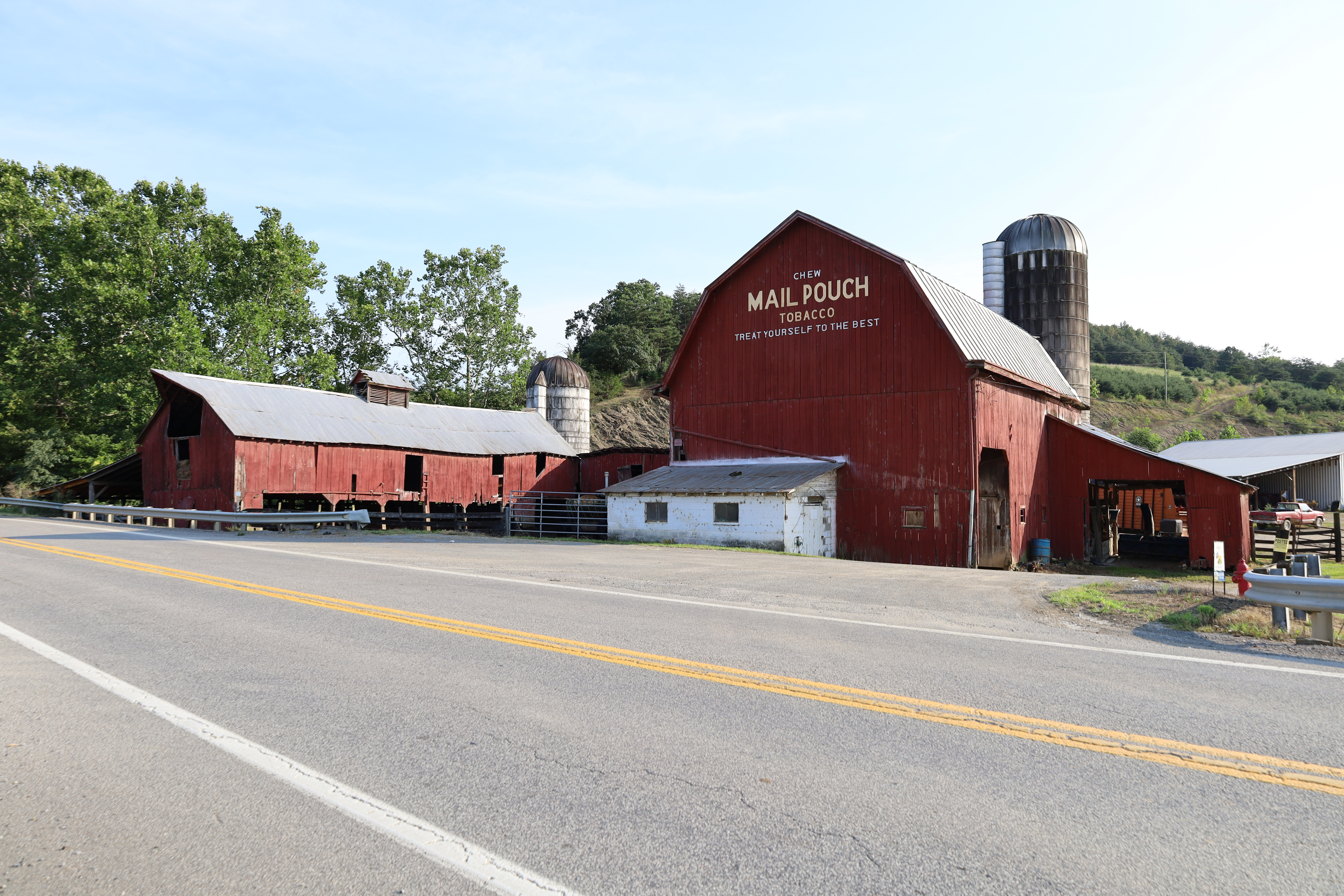
Durgon, West Virginia

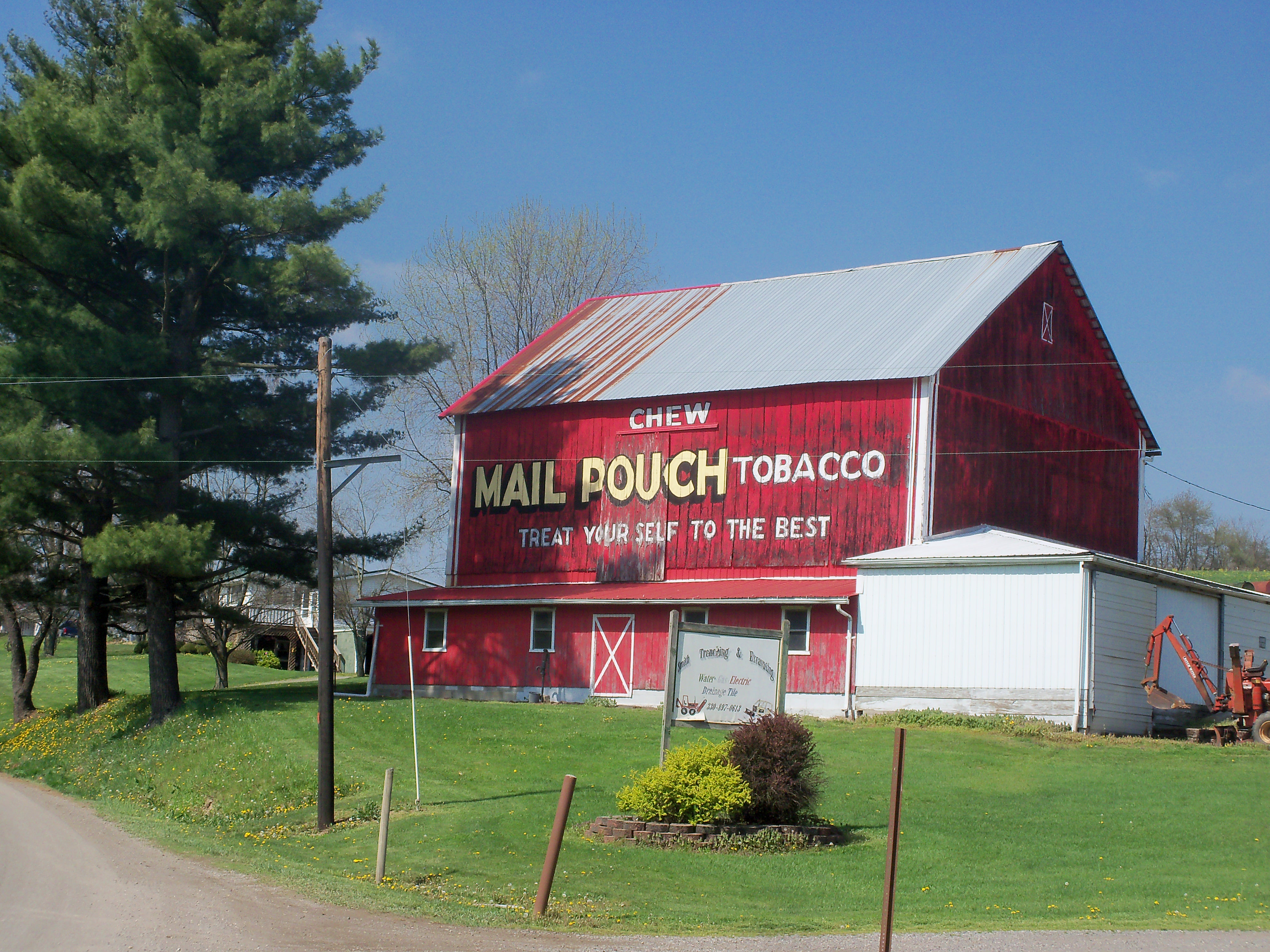
Coshocton County, Ohio

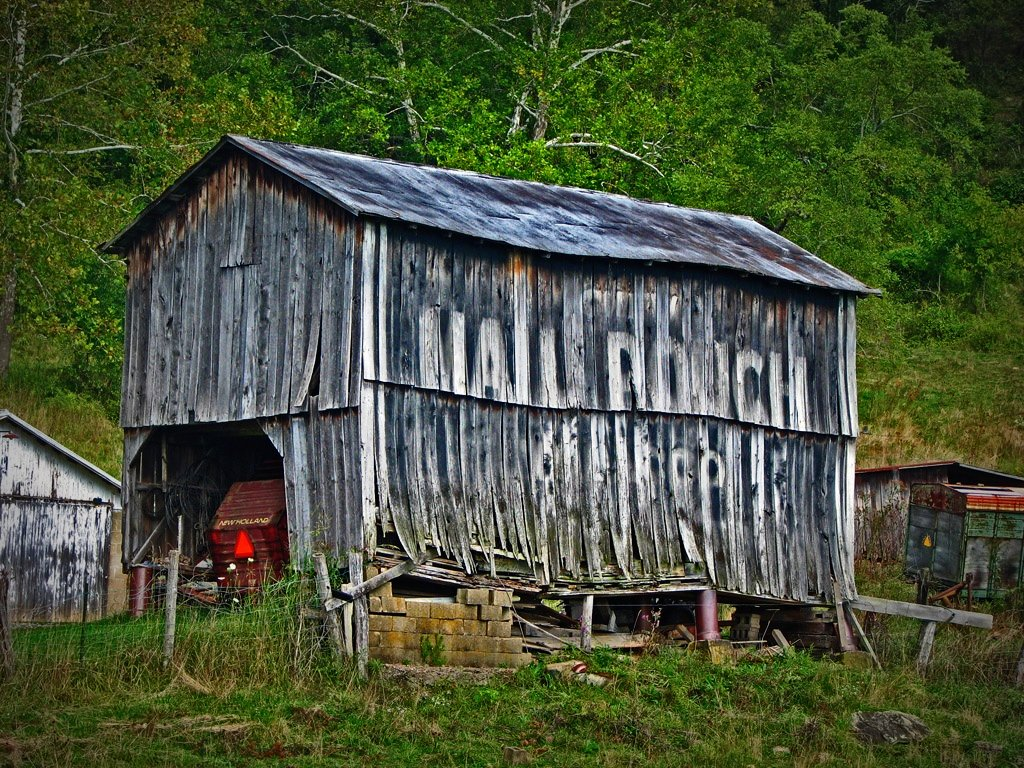
Chester Township, Meigs County, Ohio

A Mail Pouch Tobacco barn, or simply Mail Pouch barn, is a barn with one or more sides painted with a barn advertisement for the West Virginia Mail Pouch chewing tobacco brand. The program ran from 1891 to 1992, and at its height in the early 1960s, about 20,000 Mail Pouch barns were spread across 22 states.

== Locations ==
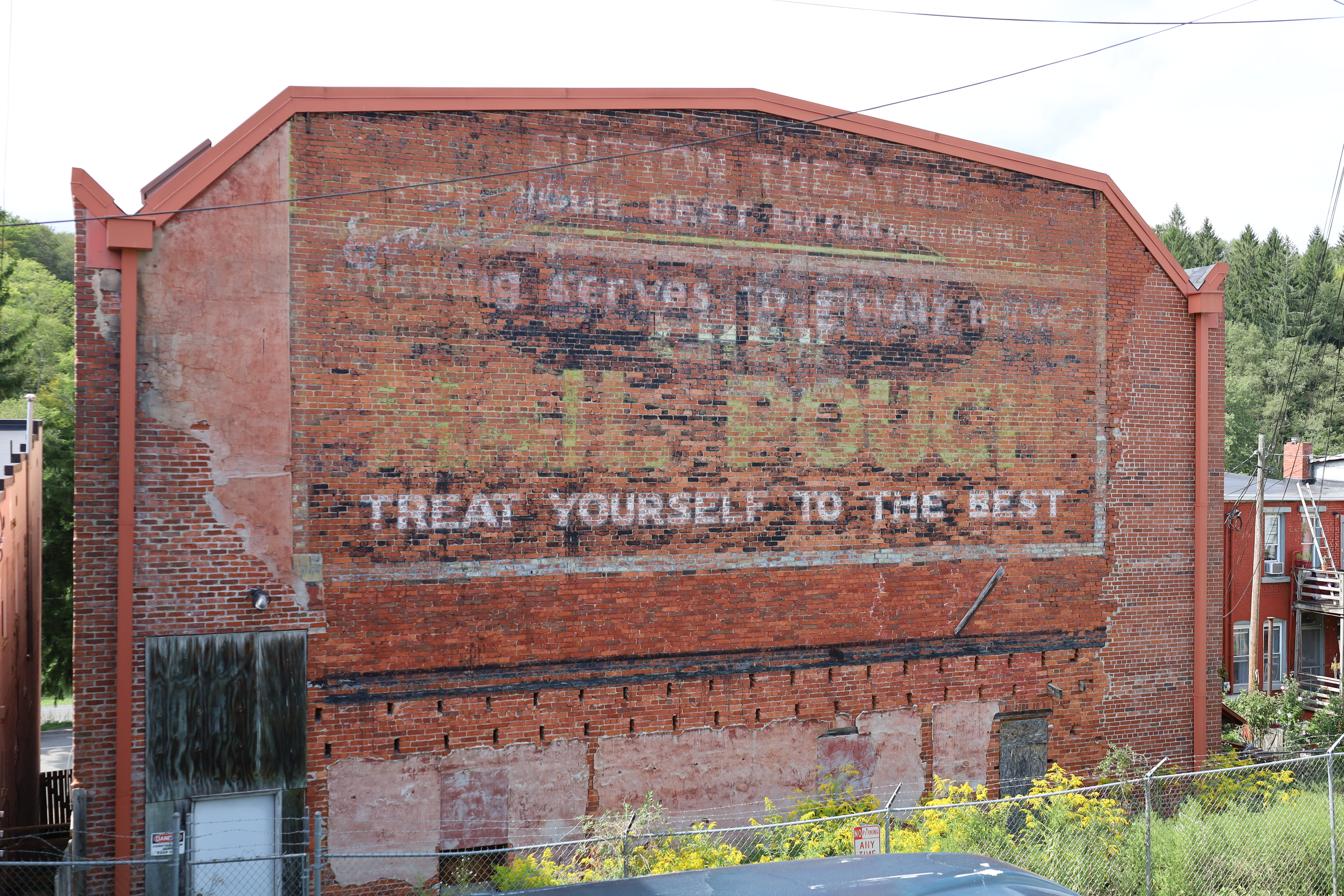
Originally, Bloch Brothers advertised on the walls of businesses, such as the Cottrill Opera House in West Virginia

These barns can be found in Illinois, Indiana, Iowa, Kentucky, Maryland, Michigan, Ohio, Pennsylvania, New Jersey, New York, South Carolina, Tennessee, Wisconsin, West Virginia, Connecticut and California (Ontario, on Jurupa and Turner, and Merced County, CA-99 and Worden Avenue), although an increasing number have fallen into dilapidation or have been demolished. The barns, usually hand-painted in black or red with yellow or white capital lettering, read as: "Chew Mail Pouch Tobacco--Treat Yourself to the Best." Sometimes, they are surrounded on the left and right by a thin vertical blue border.

Initially, barn owners were paid between $1 and $2 a year for the advertisement, equivalent in 1913 dollars to about $20–40 today, but more importantly, they received a much desired fresh coat of paint to preserve the integrity of the wood. Mail Pouch painted their message on one or two sides of the barn (depending on visibility from the roadway, an additional ad for Kentucky Club pipe mixture might be included as well) and painted the other sides of the barn any color the owner wished. Many of the barns were repainted every few years to maintain the sharp colors of the lettering.

After World War II, many of the ads were painted by Harley Warrick of Belmont County, Ohio. He once estimated that he had painted ads on 20,000 barns in his life, spending an average of six hours on each. Warrick claimed that he always began each barn with the "E" in the word "Chew". Other barns were painted by Mark Turley, Don Shires, Dick Green and several others. Their initials remain preserved on some of the barns with the date of the painting. These initials can be found on the blue border surrounding the front side, or nearer to the roof.

The Highway Beautification Act of 1965, which sought to restrict the vast number of local advertisements that were being placed near highways, exempted Mail Pouch barns since they had been deemed historic landmarks.

In 1992, the owner of Mail Pouch Tobacco at the time, Swisher International Group, decided to suspend the use of barn advertisements when Warrick retired.

In the heyday of barn advertising (around 1900–1940) many companies paid farmers to use their barns as roadside ads, with other tobacco products (such as "Beech Nut" tobacco) and local feed and grain stores being the most common, but Mail Pouch was the only product advertised in so widespread and consistent a manner in this fashion.
