= Modern Brewery Age =

Industry journal for the beer industry

Modern Brewery Age was an industry journal for the beer industry that started in 1933. It existed until 2018 and also published the industry's annual Blue Book.

It was being published by Renfrew McDowell Brighton in 1985 under his father, G. Renfrew Brighton-owned the Business Journals chain. Renfrew Brighton married Cynthia Curtis Ziegler, daughter of William Ziegler III, who owned American Maize-Products at that time, which also owned Swisher International Group.

It was also associated with writer and publisher Peter V. K. Reid.
