= John Warne Herbert Sr. =

American politician (1820–1898)

- Born: June 13, 1820; Madison Township, New Jersey, U.S.
- Died: April 10, 1898 (aged 77); Marlboro Township, New Jersey, U.S.
- Occupations: Judge; politician

John Warne Herbert Sr. (June 13, 1820 – April 10, 1898) was an American judge, newspaper publisher and politician who helped establish Marlboro Township, New Jersey, and was its first Freeholder.

== Early life ==
John Warne Herbert Sr. was born on June 13, 1820 in Madison Township, New Jersey (since renamed as Old Bridge Township, New Jersey) to William Herbert and Eleanor Conover Herbert. The family moved to (modern-day) Marlboro Township when he was seven years old. His father was primarily a farmer, but also worked in building and the production of ship timber.

== Career ==
He became a farmer in 1841, when his father, a well-known farmer in the area, passed his farm down to John. John was able to add to the land and eventually owned more than 1,000 acres (400 ha) of farmland. He became a surveyor and civil engineer early in his career.

He became Marlboro Township's Assessor, holding the position for 26 years, having been continually re-elected. In 1848, he was elected as the first Freeholder of the Township of Marlborough (now spelled Marlboro) and was instrumental in founding the Township, on February 17, 1848, when it was formed from parts of Freehold Township.

He became the Superintendent of the Monmouth County public schools, from 1850 to 1863, and then became Associate Judge of the New Jersey Court of Common Pleas and Quarter Sessions for Marlboro, from 1874 to 1879.

For ten years, he held the position of chairman of the Monmouth County Republican Committee and was treasurer for sixteen years. He was a delegate to the Republican National Conventions in 1872 (in Philadelphia), 1884 (in Chicago), and in 1888. In 1872, he was nominated for Congress, but turned down the position. In 1875, he was nominated as a Republican for the New Jersey Senate to represent the Monmouth County district, but lost the election. He was considered the leader of the Republican Party for Monmouth County throughout his political career.

From 1861 to 1865, he owned and published the Monmouth County Inquirer newspaper. He also owned a carriage building business with Theodore Aumack in Keyport, New Jersey, which he operated for twelve years. Herbert and Aumack was the largest carriage factory in Monmouth County for ten years.

He was treasurer and superintendent of the Monmouth County Plank-Road Company and director of other turnpikes in Monmouth County. He was also president of the Matawan propeller company.

== Personal life ==
On February 24, 1851, Herbert married Agnes D. Runyon Wright. They had five children, including John Warne Herbert Jr., who played in the first collegiate football game and was Vice President and Treasurer of the Helme Tobacco Company. The other children were William, Richard, Kate, and Jeanne.

In 1877, he was Vice-President of the Battle of Monmouth Monument Committee, for Marlborough.

Herbert died on April 10, 1898. He was buried at the Old Brick Reformed Church Cemetery in Marlboro.

== Legacy ==
On February 17, 2023, on the 175th anniversary of the founding of the Township, Marlboro Mayor Jonathan L. Hornik issued a proclamation, which noted the historical significance of John W. Herbert to Marlboro, proclaiming "historical figure Judge and first Freeholder John W. Herbert, who is buried in the cemetery at the Old Brick Reformed Church, ... leaving behind buildings and roads which bear their names to this day."

His ancestors purportedly include Philip Herbert, 4th Earl of Pembroke (although this is disputed in some genealogies) and Sir Thomas Warne, one of the first land owners in East Jersey.
