= Christopher Helme =

Christopher Helme (1603 – c. 1650) was an early English immigrant to the Massachusetts Bay Colony and one of the founders of Exeter, New Hampshire.

== Biography ==
Coat of Arms of Christopher Helme

Helme was baptized on 24 July 1603 in Long Sutton, Lincolnshire, England, the son of William Elme and Griselda Spratt, daughter of Richard Spratt of Barney, Norfolk, England. He arrived in Boston in the Massachusetts Bay Colony in July 1637, part of a group associated with the Reverend John Wheelwright, a clergyman from Lincolnshire who had arrived the previous year. Wheelwright and his sister-in-law Anne Hutchinson (a cousin of Christopher's stepmother, Priscilla Wentworth) quickly became embroiled in religious upheavals which caused considerable turmoil in the Colony. Governor Winthrop gave the group permission to remain in the Colony for only four months. In November 1637, the group settled into winter quarters at Piscataqua (Portsmouth, New Hampshire) and in May 1639 established the settlement of Exeter.

Wheelwright and some of his followers left Exeter for Maine around 1643, shortly after the government of New Hampshire had been taken over by Massachusetts. At this time Christopher returned to Boston. In November 1643, two of his companions, Samuel Gorton and Richard Carder, were imprisoned for heresy and sedition by the Massachusetts authorities. In 1644, the Gortonists were banished from Massachusetts. It is likely that Christopher left Boston with this group. Gorton and a few friends bought land from the Narragansett Indians about twenty miles south of Providence, where they established Warwick.

Christopher was appointed Town Sergeant, a role which required him to serve warrants, inform the town council of breaches of the law and civil disturbances, and to hold in custody those committed to his care. In August 1647, he was chosen as one of four to lay out lots and highways. In 1648, six men from each town in the colony (Providence, Newport, Warwick and Portsmouth) were chosen to be members of the Court of Trials. Christopher was one of the six chosen from Warwick.

A year later, in January 1649, he was disfranchised for threatening the town in general and for going about to undermine it. Subsequently the censure was removed. In May of that year, he was charged in the death of a Rufus Barton, but was acquitted. However, the same court found him guilty regarding the "pretended purchase" of land in Warwick, for which he was fined. Christopher died in Warwick between his trial in May 1649 and December 19, 1650, when his widow Margaret sold the family home. He was about 47 years of age. A farmer who worked his own land, he left a considerable personal estate of £1274, including a still valued at £11. His cattle and swine were worth £497, and his four "negroes" £195.

=== Legacy ===
Helme left four young sons, William, Rouse, Samuel, and Christopher. William, the eldest, was probably not yet of legal age, since his mother Margaret disposed of the family property. Margaret continued to live in Warwick with her children after her husband's death, and is mentioned several times in the town records. One entry contains the following cryptic notation: "Ordered that for Divers considerations moving the Towne therunto they have accepted of Mrs Helmes to bee an Inhabitant & to have equal privilege with the rest of the Inhabitants notwithstanding any former order to the contrary."

Margaret and Christopher were likely married about 1639, perhaps in New Hampshire. Her maiden name may have been Rouse. Her second son was given that name, and it continued to be used for many generations in the Helme family. The Rouse family name was in use early in Maine and Massachusetts, with ties back to England. Among his descendants was George Washington Helme, a Confederate officer and tobacco merchant.

== See also ==
- Family history
- Genealogy
