= Marc Steele =

American Anglican bishop (born 1980)

The Right Reverend Marc Steele
- Suffragan Bishop of the Diocese of the Living Word
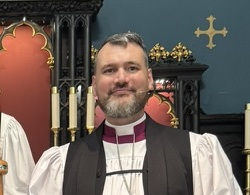
- Steele in 2025
- Church: Anglican Church in North America
- Diocese: Living Word
- In office: 2025–present
- Other posts: Rector, St. George's Anglican Church

Orders
- Ordination: May 2018 (diaconate); July 2018 (priesthood) by Julian Dobbs
- Consecration: August 16, 2025 by Steve Wood

Personal details
- Born: October 3, 1980 (age 45)
- Education: Trinity International University (M.Div.)

Marc Richard Steele (born October 3, 1980) is an American Anglican bishop. He was consecrated in 2025 as the first bishop suffragan of the Anglican Diocese of the Living Word in the Anglican Church in North America. He is also rector of St. George's Anglican Church in Helmetta, New Jersey.

== Biography ==
Bishop Marc Steele was born in 1980 as the oldest of 11 children. He married Korleen in 2001 and they have six children and two grandchildren. Steele received his M.Div. from Trinity International University in 2017.

Steele was ordained to the diaconate in 2018 and to the priesthood in 2020. He began his ordained ministry at Church of the Holy Trinity in Syracuse, New York, and was appointed the 19th rector of St. George's in Helmetta in 2020.

As the bivocational rector of St. George's, Steele was also president of New Life Food Pantry. He also served as director of communications for the diocese and senior canon for diocesan ministries. In May 2025, Steele was elected as suffragan bishop to serve under Julian Dobbs and consecrated in August 2025.

In the aftermath of the July 2025 Central Texas floods, which affected a Living Word diocesan congregation in Kerrville, Steele coordinated the on-the-ground response of the Anglican Relief and Development Fund.
