= Glenwood Institute =

Former private school in New Jersey, US (1834–1915)

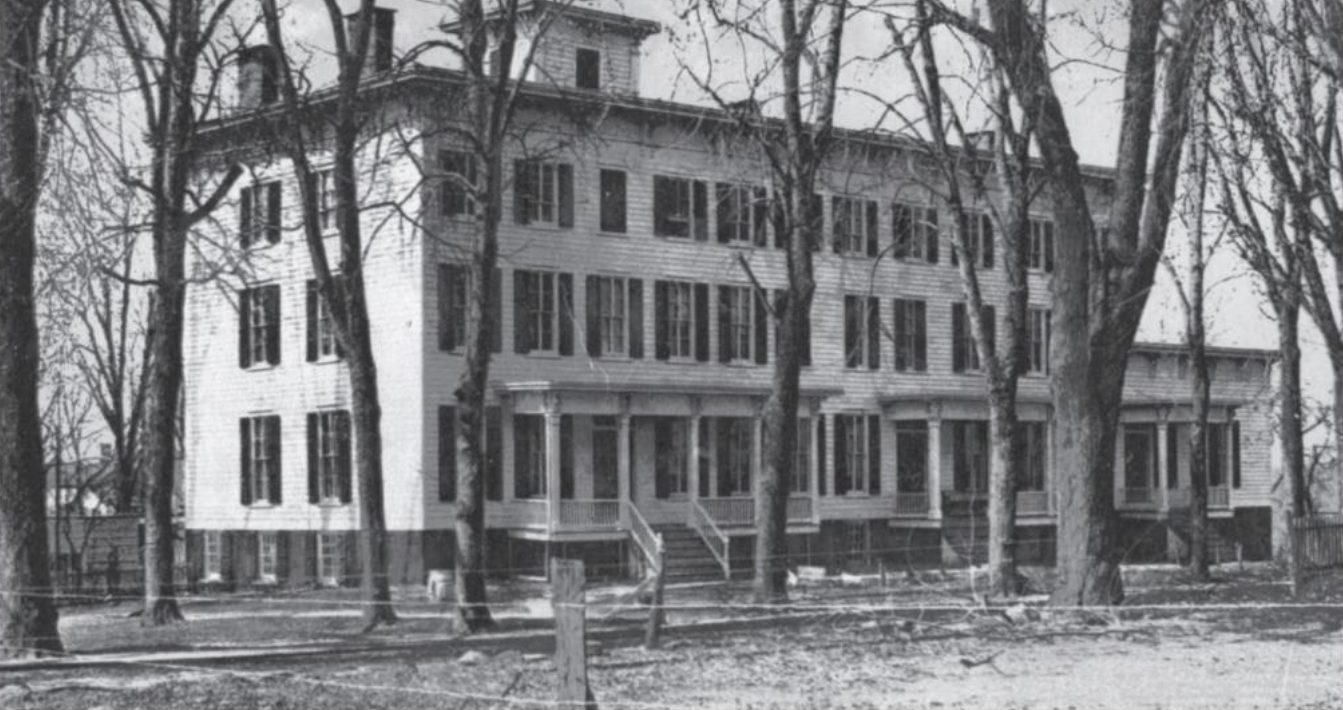

Location
- 10 Church Street; Matawan, New Jersey 10747; United States

Information
- Type: Private boarding school
- Established: 1834
- Founders: William Little
- Closed: 1915
- Gender: Co-educational
- Enrollment: 84 (1838)

Glenwood Institute was a private co-educational boarding school in Matawan, New Jersey.

The school was established in 1834 by William Little. William Cooley was the first principal of the school, which had only two students in its first year.

The school was originally across the street from its later location at 10 Church Street. A one-room schoolhouse, in a 44-foot-by-26-foot structure, was erected in 1838. As noted in the 1838 catalogue for the school details were as follows: Enrollment began on May 2, 1838. The class enrollment was 84 students, with 45 boys and 39 girls. The trustees of the school were Rev. Joseph L. Shafer, William Little, Elihu Baker, Asbury Fountain, and Garrett P. Conover. The teachers were Philetus Phillips (the principal from 1836 to 1844), Thomas H. Shafer, M. Louise Cox, and Cynthia P. Collins. The academic year was divided into four terms of eleven weeks.

In 1857, the school moved to the 10 Church Street location into a three-story Italianate style structure. It was originally established as the Middletown Point Academy, as the town of Matawan was known as Middletown Point until 1857. It was enlarged and renamed the Glenwood Institute in 1874. It has also been called the Glenwood College Institute.

A 1922 book, the History of Monmouth County, called the school, the "largest and most flourishing of the academies in Monmouth County during th[is] early period."

The school later became the Collegiate Institute of Middletown Point and finally renamed as the Matawan Military Academy. It ceased operations in 1915, in part due to competition from free local public high schools.

The building was later converted into a condominium building. It is a Contributing property to the Main Street historic district.

== Notable alumni and faculty ==
- Garret Hobart, 24th Vice President of the United States
- Joseph D. Bedle, 23rd Governor of New Jersey, in office from 1875 to 1878
- Robert Borden, 8th Prime Minister of Canada (1911–1920), Professor of Classics and Mathematics at the school from 1873 to 1874
- Elmer H. Geran, U.S. Congressman for New Jersey's 3rd congressional district (1923–1925)
- Miriam Coles Harris, novelist
- John Warne Herbert Jr., (1853–1934), former mayor of Helmetta, New Jersey, who played for Rutgers in the first-ever college football game
- Henry Stafford Little, former New Jersey state senator and President of Central Railroad of New Jersey
