= Miriam Coles Harris =

American writer

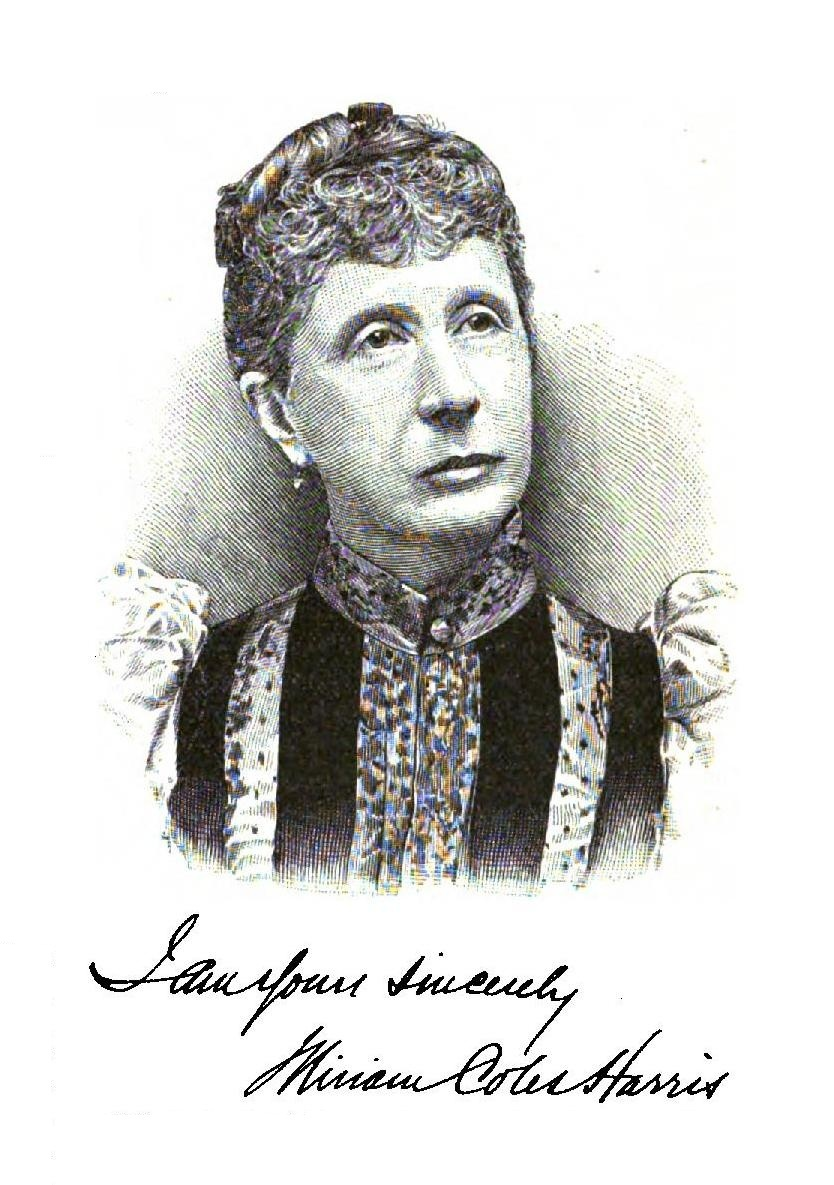
- Miriam Coles in Book News 1894
- Born: July 7, 1834; Dosoris, Long Island, New York
- Died: January 23, 1925 (aged 90); Pau, Basse-Pyrenées, France
- Occupations: Novelist; devotional works; children's stories
- Writing career
- Notable work: Rutledge (1860)

Miriam Coles Harris (July 7, 1834 in East Island, Glen Cove, Long Island – January 23, 1925 in Pau, France) was an American novelist. She wrote several novels, a book of children's stories and two devotional books. She shunned publicity and wrote her first book anonymously, causing the opposite of the desired effect in that several impostors claimed to be the author, resulting in a literary furore, and more attention than the real author ever foresaw.

== Life and works ==
Miriam Coles was born into a Long Island family going back to the 17th century. She was descended from Robert Coles who immigrated to America with John Winthrop in 1630. She was educated at the Glenwood Institute in Matawan, New Jersey, St. Mary's Hall - Doane Academy (now Doane Academy) in Burlington, New Jersey, and Mme. Canda's Girls' School in New York City. On April 20, 1864, she married Sidney Smith Harris (1832–1892) of New York, a lawyer, with whom she had two children, a son, Sidney (Note: Julius Chambers (ca. 1912) The Book of New York; forty years' recollections of the American metropolis: "Sidney Harris is as prominent and popular in society as in clubdom. In politics he has figured for the last twenty years. At the bar and in public office, in his quiet and effective way, he has won the respect of the judiciary, of his professional brethren, and of the public. Born in New York City in 1866, the son of Sidney Smith Harris and Miriam Coles Harris, received his preliminary education at St. Paul's School, Concord, N. H. Later, at Columbia University, in addition to pursuing his studies with average zeal, he distinguished himself in athletic competitions. Mr. Harris received the degree of B.A. from Columbia University and in 1889 he was graduated also from the Law School of the University with the degree of LL.B.") and a daughter, Natalie.

After the death of her husband in 1892, she spent most of her time in Europe, dying in Pau, Pyrénées-Atlantiques, France in 1925.

She was a devout Episcopalian, who late in life, some sources suggest, converted to Roman Catholicism. (Note: Woman's Who's Who of America (1914) states that she was "Roman Catholic" and "against woman's suffrage", Distinguished Converts to Rome in America (1907), while listing her son Sydney Harris, does not list his mother. American Ecclesiastical Review, Volume 19 (1898) published by Catholic University of America writes, "CORNER OF SPAIN Miriam Coles Harris: The author is a devout Protestant but a warm admirer of Spanish piety and its obvious results. No Catholic could more felicitously praise the Spanish clergy and their devotion."American ecclesiastical review. Catholic University of America. 1898.) New Catholic World, Volume 86 (1908), in a review of Tents of Wickedness wrote, "The keen appreciation, the deep sympathy, shown in the telling of that story bespeak a personal note, something perhaps of what the author herself has experienced in her way to the Catholic Church." In Catholic world, Volume 68 (1899) it states, "we have received the following notice of an author, Mrs. Miriam Coles Harris, who entered the one true church about two years ago ... Unlike most American authors, Mrs. Harris has not been a contributor to magazines, having done no writing outside of her novels with the exception of two devotional books written while she was a member of the Anglican Church. Her most recent publication, A Corner of Spain, is therefore somewhat of a departure ... When Mrs. Harris made the visit to Spain, she was not a Catholic." However that information is inaccurate, she had written many magazine articles. She published a number of children's stories with a religious theme, prior to her first novel. These included Philip and Arthur (1859), Ash Wednesday in the Nursery (1859) and Saturday Afternoon (1859).

Coles-Harris also wrote many magazine articles. These include "A Playwrights Novitiate" in the Atlantic Monthly (1894), on writing for the stage, (Note: From "A Playwright's Novitiate" (October 1894) The Atlantic Monthly, "The church seems always to have had a quarrel with the drama, ever since it passed from a religious ceremony into an art. Now, someone says, it is passing rapidly from an art into an amusement. And it is true that people do not go to the theatre to hear a sermon preached to them; but preach it as Sardou preached it in Fedora, and they will listen.") and another in Lippincott's Magazine (1893), criticizing the undue exaltation of what she called "Seventh Commandment novels".

=== Rutledge ===
Her first novel was Rutledge, released in 1860. It has been described as the first "fully-American Gothic novel." The narrator is an orphaned teenager whose aunt sends her to live with her new guardian, Arthur Rutledge, in his ancestral home. (Note: From Rutledge (1860) "If I had cherished any romantic hope that this "accomplished gentleman" might prove anything out of which I could make that dearest dream of schoolgirl's heart, a lover, I likewise relinquished that most speedily, for nothing in the person before me, gave encouragement to such an idea. Rather below than above the medium size, and of a firm, well-proportioned figure, Mr. Rutledge gave one, from his commanding and decided carriage, the impression of a much larger man. His dark hair was slightly dashed with grey, his eyes were keen and cold, the lines of care and thought about his brow were deep and strong. If his face could be said to have an attraction, it lay in the rare smile that sometimes changed the sternness of his mouth into winning sweetness and grace. But this was so rare that it could hardly be called a characteristic of his habitually cold stern face. That it wore it that evening however, I knew then as now, was because I was a child, and a miserable, frightened one besides. I never doubted that he knew how I felt, and read me thoroughly.") As in the case of Jane Eyre before it, and Rebecca some eighty years later, the mansion holds a dark secret. She falls in love with Rutledge, but misunderstandings and jealousy lead her to behave antagonistically, becoming engaged to a young man with serious emotional problems and a horrible past. The author had written several chapters before she realized that she had not given a name to the heroine. Then it occurred to her that if she could finish the book without supplying a name, the idea would be unique.

Coles' first novel and work up to that time were published anonymously. Part of an article in the Brooklyn Daily Eagle (January 18, 1891) states,

"One of the notable points in the history of American literature was the great success of the novel 'Rutledge,' published in 1860, the long continued discussion and inquiry as to its authorship and the remarkable claims of two or three women in various parts of the country to have written it. The book ran through edition after edition, and was talked about with equal vigor in the newspaper columns and in drawing rooms and boarding schools. While this furore was going on the mysterious author of "Rutledge", a young girl, Miriam Coles, was living quietly in her home at Oyster Bay and listening gravely to the denials of her family that she had written the book or had anything to do with it. The secret was well kept until two other books from the same pen had appeared, 'The Sutherlands' and 'Louie's Last Term at St Mary's', and until Miss Coles had married a New York lawyer, Sydney S Harris. Mrs Harris' mother was a Weeks, and the family homestead was the present house of John A Weeks, at Oyster Bay. Here Miss Coles, who was born at Dosoria, on East Island, wrote the first part of Rutledge, with no confidante but her mother.

One result of the strict privacy which Mrs Harris has maintained is that two or three impostors have been able to flourish in various parts of the country upon the claim that they wrote 'Rutledge'. The most remarkable of these was a woman who was killed by a runaway accident at St. Paul, Minn., ten years ago. She called herself Miriam Coles Harris, and her death was telegraphed all over the country by that name, while the real Mrs Harris was in her country house at Southampton. The Minnesota woman it was shown had been traveling for two or three years in various parts of the West and South as Mrs Harris. She is said to have been an educated and intelligent woman but inasmuch as it was discovered that she had been a forger, and had suffered a term of imprisonment for that offense, she was not an agreeable sort of double to have." (Note: The following appeared in Handy Book of Literary Curiosities (1892) by William Shepard Walsh about yet another impostor, "A more successful impersonator, because she remained undiscovered until her death by the neighborhood on which she had imposed, was a certain Mrs. S. S. Harris (auspicious name !), who in 1875 established herself in the little town of Hudson, Wisconsin. She claimed to have come from New York, and to be the Mrs. Sidney Harris who had written " Rutledge," " Sutherlands," and other novels. She was very eccentric, affected sporting tastes, and liked to drive fast horses; but these traits were probably looked upon as the natural accompaniments of genius, and she easily established for herself a good social standing, and in fact was lionized as a literary celebrity. One day when out driving with some friends she suddenly died of heart-disease, and the publication of her obituary in the local paper exposed the fraud.")

(This article was reprinted in abbreviated form in Book News (October, 1893))

=== An Utter Failure ===
The following review appeared in The Eclectic Magazine of Foreign literature, Science, and Art, Volume 54 - Page 859 (1891)

A NOVEL WITH A TAG TO IT, An Utter Failure, A Novel, By Miriam Coles Harris, Author of Rutledge, etc., New York, D Appleton & Co.

"The author of 'Rutledge' has not been as prolific in literary production as one might wish, but her last book, now before us proves, that her pen has not lost its cunning. The story is a pathetic one and its melancholy is but slightly relieved by any sunshiny pictures of life. We do not quite see any sufficient motive for Rachel's marriage to Count Paolo Buonamici on her Italian visit, except that the American girl was blinded and dazzled by the general fascination of Italy, for she does not love the man -- an empty-headed, cold-hearted, sterile-natured man, who conquers ber by the brief passion of temperament and a certain clinging persistence like that of the jelly fish. The Italian count wins the girl and her fortune, and finally comes to America to enter the banking business, fully developed in the most mean and despicable of all passions -- avarice. The upshot is that he makes his wife exquisitely miserable, alienates her two children, and when the separation finally occurs, takes them away from her forever, and she dies of a broken heart. Whether or not the author intends to emphasize, in this vividly sad picture of a ruined life, the great danger the American girl runs in marrying a foreigner, specially if in so doing she puts all her property in his hands, we do not know. Certainly this thought is powerfully impressed on the mind, and it seems to stand out in letters of fire between the lines. An added element of tragedy gives its touch of interest in the discovery, too late, by Rachel that she has a heart, and that it beats for a man whom she might have married but for one of those trivial accidents which seem nothing at the time, but which are weapons more effective in the hands of that stern and veiled Anangke who was fabled to stand behind the thrones of even the gods, than the thunderbolts of Jove himself. The true-hearted man and the no less true-hearted woman go apart from each other to lives of accumulated misery that not even the shadow of shame may come to them. Mrs Harris has given the public a touching and significant book, worked out with a nice sense of spiritual portraiture, and made artistically effective by an incisive and agreeable style."

Her other works include The Sutherlands (1862), Louie's Last Term at St. Mary's (1864), Frank Warrington (1863), Richard Vandermark (1871), Roundhearts, and other Stories (1871), A Perfect Adonis (1880), Missy (1882), Dear Feast of Lent (1883) and The Tents of Wickedness (1909),

== Bibliography ==
- Rutledge. Derby & Jackson, New York. 1860.
- Rudd and Carleton (1861). The Sutherlands.
- Frank Warrington. New York: G. W. Carleton & Co. 1863.
- Louie's Last Term at St. Mary's (a.k.a. Louie Atterbury). New York: G. W. Carleton & Co. 1864.
- St. Philips. New York: G. W. Carleton & Co. 1864.
- A Rosary for Lent, Devotional Readings. G. W. Carleton & Co. 1867.
- Roundhearts, and Other Stories. New York: G. W. Carleton & Co. 1866.
- Richard Vandermark. New York: Scribners. 1871.
- Dear Feast of Lent: A Series of Devotional Readings. Dutton and Co. 1874.
- Marguerite's Journal. New York: G. W. Carleton & Co. 1875.
- A Perfect Adonis. Carleton. 1875.
- Missy. New York: G. W. Carleton & Co. 1880.
- Happy-Go-Lucky. Houghton, Mifflin & Co. 1881.
- Phoebe. Houghton, Mifflin & Co. 1884.
- An Utter Failure. D. Appleton & Co. 1891.
- A Chit of Sixteen, and Other Stories. G. W. Dillingham & Co. 1892.
- A Corner of Spain. Houghton, Mifflin & Co. 1898. (Note: From "Books on Spain and Cuba", The Brooklyn Daily Eagle (Dec. 3, 1898), "Mrs. Harris saw a bull fight at the Seville fair where Espartero, the great matadore, who a few weeks later met his death in the bull ring at Madrid, was foremost of the stars of the hour. A pathetic little picture is made of a bull who would not fight and had literally to be goaded to his death. "Three times during his probation," says Mrs. Harris, "he shook himself clear of their persecution, and trotted around the vast space, and with a wonderful intelligence stopped before the toril door and looked up to the crowd with a wistful appeal to be let out of this brutal field of blood. It was strange that he would know the toril door, the place is so huge, and the barrier so round and monotonous. But again and again he came back and stood before it, the blood streaming from his wounds, the barbed banderilla shaking in his flesh as he ran. His look as he lifted his head to the crowd and stood imploring at the toril door will always trouble me.")
- The Tents of Wickedness. D. Appleton & Co. 1907.
