= Londonderry, Ross County, Ohio =

Unincorporated community in Ohio, U.S.

Coordinates: 39°16′0″N 82°47′24″W

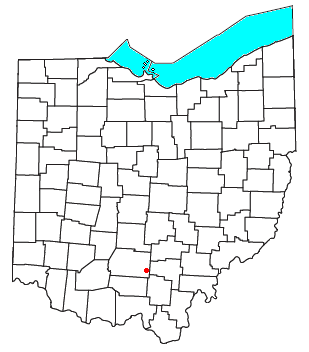
Location of Londonderry, Ohio

Londonderry is an unincorporated community in eastern Liberty Township, Ross County, Ohio, United States. It has a post office with the ZIP code 45647. It lies along U.S. Route 50 at its intersection with State Route 327.

== History ==
Londonderry was laid out in 1831. A post office was established under the name Gillespieville in 1833, and the name was changed to Londonderry in 1929. The present name is derived from Londonderry, Northern Ireland, the native home of a first settler.

== Gallery ==
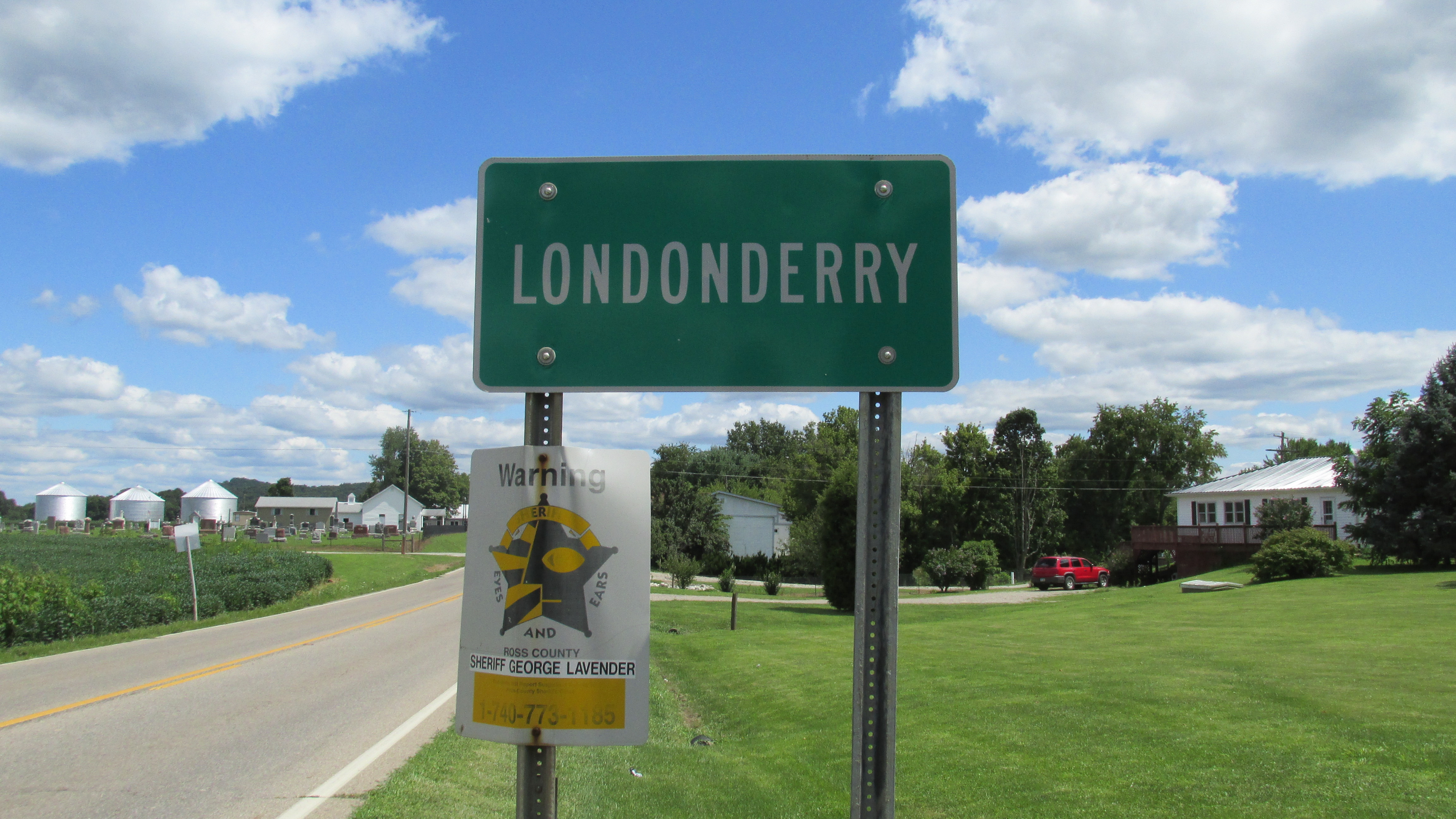
Londonderry community sign

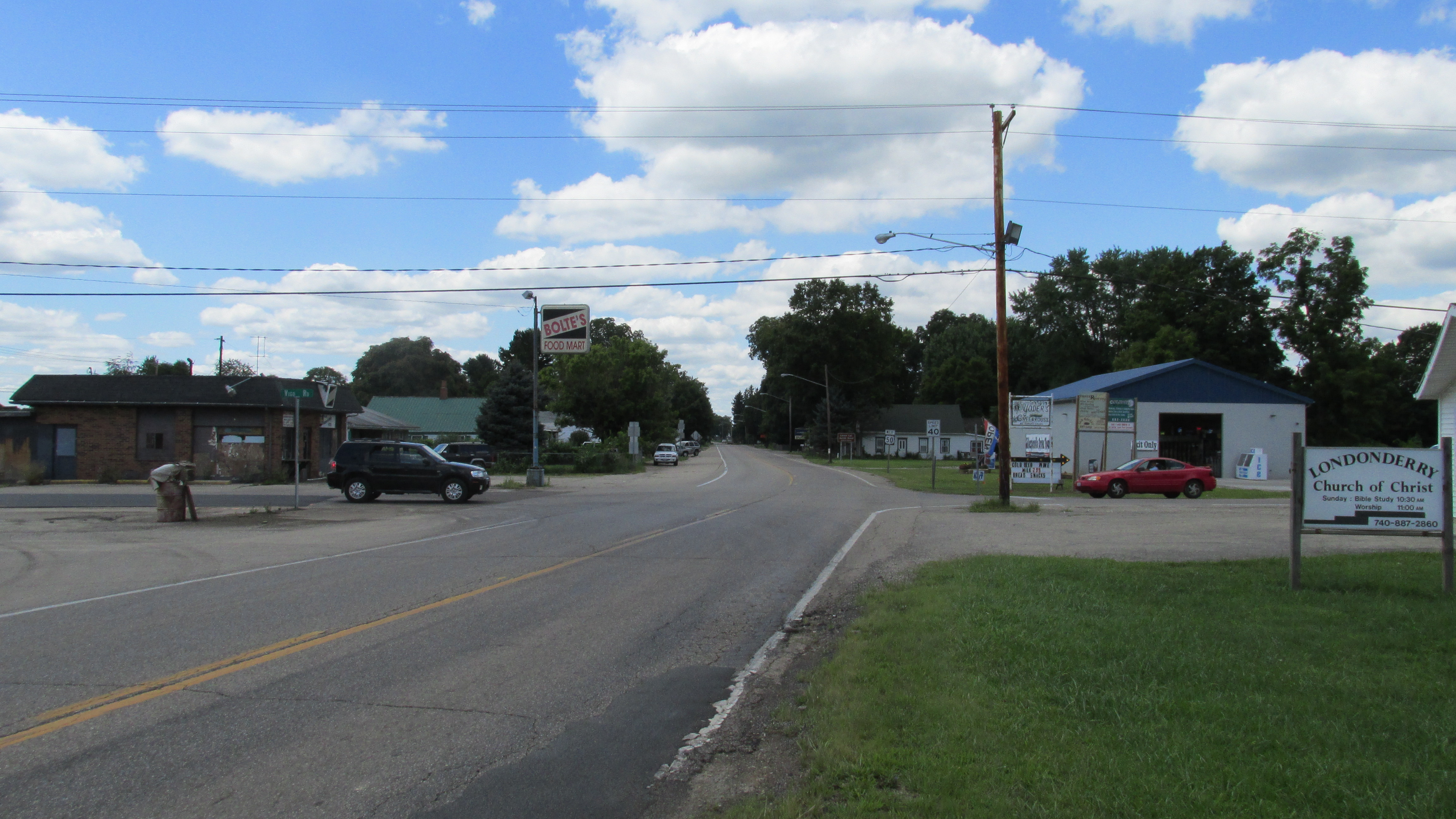
Looking west at the intersection of US Highway 50 and Ohio Highway 327

== Notable person ==
- Harley Warrick, barn painter
