= G.W. Helme Snuff Mill Historic District =

Historic district in New Jersey, United States

- G. W. Helme Snuff Mill District
- U.S. National Register of Historic Places
- U.S. Historic district
- New Jersey Register of Historic Places
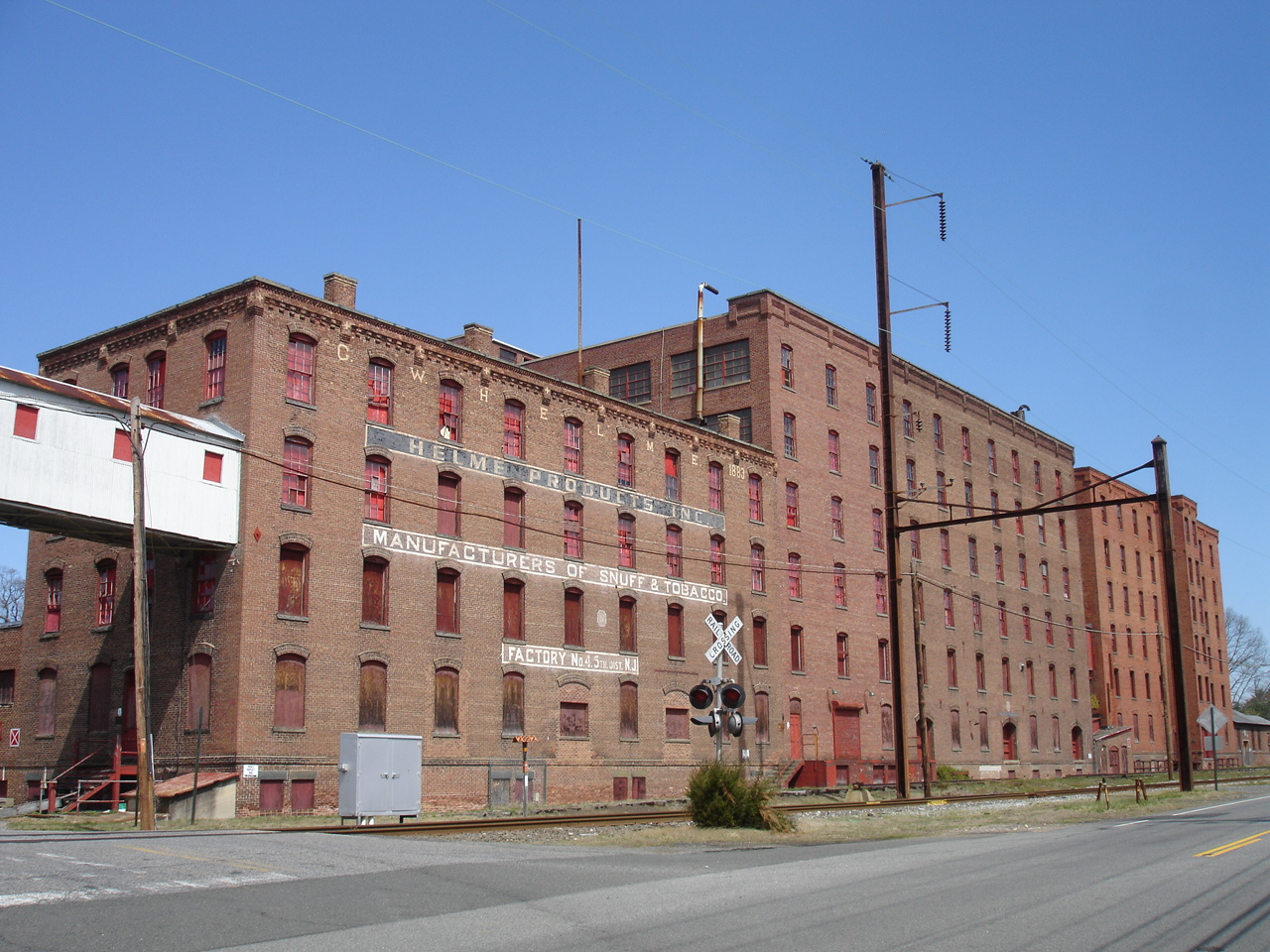
- The Helmetta Snuff Mill in Spring 2012

- Location within Middlesex County, New Jersey Location within New Jersey Location within the United States
- Location: Main Street; Helmetta, New Jersey
- Coordinates: 40°22′39″N 74°25′31″W
- NRHP reference No.: 80002503
- NJRHP No.: 1842

Significant dates
- Added to NRHP: August 15, 1980
- Designated NJRHP: February 1, 1980

The G.W. Helme Snuff Mill Historic District is a New Jersey and United States registered historic district located in Helmetta, New Jersey.

It is a classic example of a late 1800s mill town. The buildings were all constructed, for the most part, in the 1880s and 1890s. George Helme founded started the Helme Tobacco Company in 1880 and founded the Borough of Helmetta in 1888, and most of the buildings were built around that time.

There were about 80 buildings at the time it was registered as a historic district in New Jersey and the United States.The district consists of the George Washington Helme snuff mill, housing for employees, accessory buildings, St. George's Episcopal Church, Holy Trinity Roman Catholic Church, and Helmetta Pond, which at one time served as a source of power for the mill.

The buildings originally comprised: 54 buildings for the workers' houses; 10 buildings for the workers' cottages; 19 buildings consisting of middle class houses; 4 buildings consisting of the three mansions for the owners and the manager of the company; and 12 buildings consisting of factories, warehouses, and Helme Tobacco Company.

The three Helme family mansions have all been demolished, the last one (the Helme-Herbert House) being demolished in 2024.

About 109 buildings were originally in the district, which was named to the New Jersey Register of Historic Places on February 1, 1980, and to the National Register of Historic Places, on August 15, 1980. The District includes the home of the Borough of Helmetta founder, George Washington Helme as well as 116 other buildings in Helmetta.

Helmetta's main landmark is the large, abandoned Helme Tobacco Company plant that sits adjacent to the Camden and Amboy Railroad line running through the borough. The mill began producing snuff in the 1880s.

On February 23, 1900, the mill was bought by the American Snuff Company, but the mill was returned to the Helme Tobacco Company in 1911 due to the ruling of the United States Supreme Court in United States v. American Tobacco Co.

In 1925, the mill became the largest of its kind in the world, and by 1934 it employed 400 people. In 1986, the mill was bought out by American Maize-Products, which owned Swisher International at the time. Finally, in 1993, it was purchased by Swisher International, and operations were moved to Wheeling, West Virginia. In 2012, the mill was purchased by Kaplan Companies and was subsequently transformed into an apartment complex. The transformation was completed in 2017.
