= Helme Tobacco Company =

American tobacco company

- Company type: Private (1880–1986); Subsidiary (1986–)
- Industry: smokeless Tobacco
- Founded: 1880
- Founder: George Washington Helme
- Fate: Acquired by Swisher in 1986
- Headquarters: Originally Helmetta, New Jersey; now Jacksonville, Florida
- Products: smokeless tobacco, Snuff (tobacco)
- Website: Swisher.Com

The Helme Tobacco Company was a smokeless tobacco company founded by George Washington Helme in Helmetta, New Jersey, in 1880, which is currently owned by Swisher (company).

== History ==
Helme, a former Major-General in the Confederate States Army, built a snuff mill in East Brunswick, New Jersey, later seceding from the town and renaming it to Helmetta, New Jersey, after his daughter, "Etta." He built the a snuff mill, initially called the Railroad Snuff Mill and later the George W. Helme Snuff Mill, and 109 homes for his workers.

In 1866, Helme began a snuff enterprise with his brother-in-law, Jacob Appleby. George's father-in-law, Leonard Appleby, owned a snuff mill in Spotswood, New Jersey, the Railroad Mill, established in 1825 and one of the oldest snuff mills in the country,. Helme and Jacob's partnership was for Leonard Appleby's mill company, and the partnership with Jacob lasted until 1877 or 1878, when George began his own enterprise, naming it the George W. Helme Tobacco Company. It became one of the largest snuff producers in the country. In 1889, George Helme's son-in-law, John Warne Herbert Jr., gave up his lucrative law practice and became the vice president and Treasurer of the company (and mayor of Helmetta in 1890).

The Helmetta area where the Helme Snuff Mill was located is now known as the G.W. Helme Snuff Mill Historic District, which was named to the New Jersey Register of Historic Places on February 1, 1980, and to the National Register of Historic Places, on August 15, 1980.

In February 1900, the company became a minor part of the American Tobacco Company, which was a conglomerate that controlled 96% of the industry by 1906. In May, 1900, the George W. Helme Company was dissolved, but production by the American Tobacco Company still continued under the name George W. Helme Company.

On May 29, 1911, Helme was one of three snuff companies - joined by the American Snuff Company; and the Weyman-Bruton Company - created from the dissolution of the monopoly that was ordered by the Supreme Court of the United States in United States v. American Tobacco Co.

As part of the dissolution, Helme gained control of the Lorillard Snuff Company, a division of the Lorillard Tobacco Company and the oldest snuff manufacturer in the country, having been established in 1760 by Pierre Lorillard. The Lorillard Snuff Mill was located in Jersey City, New Jersey.

The company also obtained the Garrett Snuff Mill (although the American Snuff Company received the Garrett trademarks). The Garrett Snuff Mill and the area around it, the Garrett Snuff Mills Historic District, are both listed on the National Register of Historic Places, having been registered in 1978 and 1980 respectively.

By 1925, the company claimed to be the world's largest producer of Snuff (tobacco).

In 1934, the New Yorker magazine wrote an article on the George W. Helme Co. Helme claimed to be the oldest snuff company in the country, citing its effective takeover of Lorillard Snuff.

In 1954, the company created a comic book called ''Helme's Snuff Man.'' The comic book featured a "snuff sales man" named George and his stories for children about the snuff industry. The goal of the comic was likely to influence public opinion on the socioeconomic issue of consuming snuff.

In 1983, Helme bought the General Cigar and Tobacco Company, the owners of the Bloch Brothers Tobacco Company, and its subsidiary, the Christian Peper Tobacco Company. Helme then had two manufacturing facilities, the one in Helmetta and the Bloch factory in Wheeling, West Virginia.

In 1986, the American Maize-Products Company, through its subsidiary, Swisher International (Swisher & Son, Inc.), acquired the Helme Tobacco Company, for $65 Million. The Mill in Helmetta continued to operate until 1993. Swisher is still in business today.

== Brand revival ==
In 2024, Swisher rebranded its smokeless tobacco brand to the historic Helme Tobacco Company. Swisher President & Chief Executive Officer, Neil Kiely, stated that, “The Helme name is synonymous with high-quality products, and reflects the unwavering commitment of the Wheeling, West Virginia, team.”

== See also ==
- George Washington Helme
- G. W. Helme Snuff Mill Historic District
- Swisher - WELCOME TO HELME TOBACCO COMPANY
