= Town serjeant =

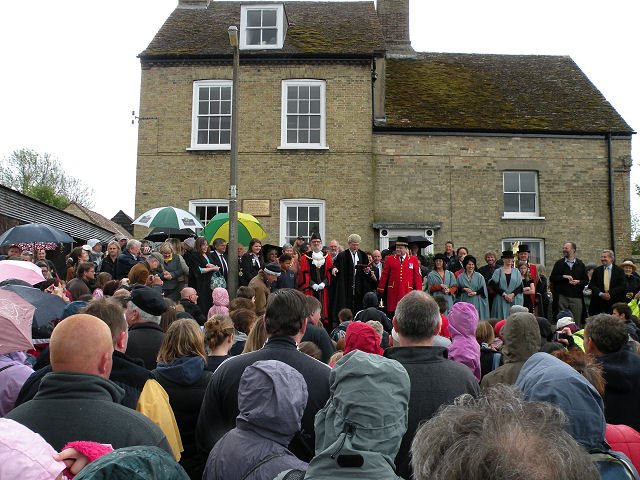
Town serjeant and others at a local event

The town serjeant (alternative spelling town sergeant) is the serjeant-at-arms for local municipalities in English borough councils and serves as a law enforcement official for some towns in the United States. In Scotland the title is used in Aberdeen for the same purpose.

The position dates to the 16th century and its functions included macebearer, bailiff, and gaoler. Historically, the serjeant aided the mayor and also served a ceremonial role. Today in the United Kingdom, the position is largely ceremonial, without law-enforcement responsibility.

It the United States, particularly in New England states such as Rhode Island, towns still elect town sergeants who serve a law enforcement role.
