= Old Brick Reformed Church =

Church building in Marlboro Township, New Jersey

Coordinates: 40.3347°N 74.2405°W

- Old Brick Reformed Church
- Address: 490 County Rte 520, Marlboro Township, New Jersey
- Country: United States
- Denomination: Reformed

Architecture
- Years built: 1731, 1826

The Old Brick Reformed Church was established in Marlboro Township, New Jersey c.1699. Many of the original church families migrated from Long Island. Initially, services were conducted in Dutch by Ministers who rotated from Brooklyn. This practice continued for several years until the formation of the Marlboro Reformed Dutch Church in 1709, originally known as the "Reformed Church of Freehold and Middletown" and then the "Freehold and Middletown United Church," with Reverend Joseph Morgan serving as its inaugural pastor. The church records begin on October 9, 1709. It is part of the Reformed Church of America, and is the longest continuous ministry in the United States. In 1931, its name changed to the present named.

The use of the Dutch language persisted until 1764, when Benjamin Dubois became the church's first American-born pastor. Dubois is the great-grandfather of Vice President Garret Hobart.

The initial church congregation was situated near "Hendrickson's Hill" in the historic village of Marlboro. The present church and burial ground are located on Route 520. Construction of the current church began in 1731; however, it was replaced in 1826 due to size constraints. In 1869, a chapel was erected in the former village of Marlboro, but it was sold in 1969. It is the oldest Reformed church in Monmouth County.

During a consistory meeting, Reverend George Kaden, the former pastor, announced his retirement and submitted his retirement papers to the denomination. He left the pulpit in June 2021. The current minister is Marie Bacchiocchi.

The Old Brick Reformed Church Cemetery is also situated at the site. People buried there include Revolutionary War soldier George Wyckoff and the founder of Marlboro Township, New Jersey, John Warne Herbert Sr.

It is listed as a historic site by the Monmouth County Historical Association and the Monmouth County Park System, in their Historic Sites Inventory (HSI), as well as the Marlboro Township Historic Commission, as a Historic Commissions Landmark (HCL).

== See also ==
- Holmdel Dutch Reformed Church
