= St. George's Anglican Church (Helmetta, New Jersey) =

Historic church in company town Helmetta, New Jersey, United States

Coordinates: 40.3775°N 74.4207°W

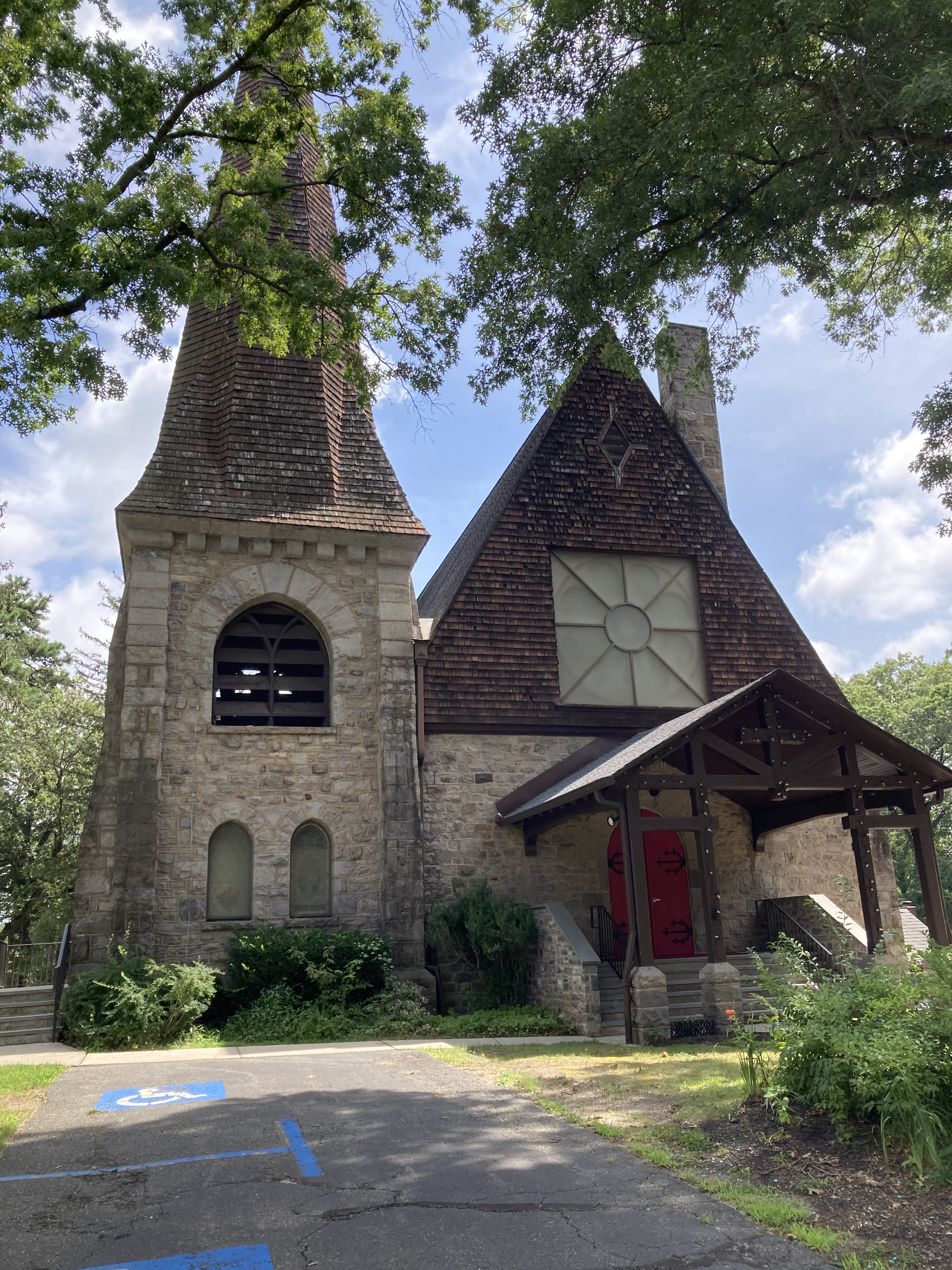
- St. George's Anglican Church
- Location: Helmetta, New Jersey
- Country: United States
- Denomination: Anglican Church in North America
- Website: www.helmettachurch.com

History
- Founder: George Washington Helme

Architecture
- Style: Queen Anne; Shingle style
- Years built: 1894

Administration
- Diocese: Living Word

Clergy
- Rector: The Rt. Rev. Marc Steele
- St. George's Church
- U.S. Historic district – Contributing property
- Part of: G. W. Helme Snuff Mill District (ID80002503)
- Added to NRHP: August 15, 1980

St. George's Anglican Church is a historic Anglican parish in Helmetta, New Jersey. Built as St. George's Episcopal Church to serve families residing in the company town for George Washington Helme's snuff mill, the congregation left the Episcopal Church in 2010 and joined the Anglican Church in North America.

== History ==
Before his death in 1893, Helme planned the church for mill workers residing in Helmetta. Architect William Horatio Day designed the church, parsonage and lych gate in a Queen Anne Gothic style. The church was built by Helme's family and heirs in 1894.

A stone parish hall was added in the 1960s.

In 2010, as part of the broader Anglican realignment in North America, St. George's agreed to pay a settlement to the Episcopal Diocese of New Jersey to leave the Episcopal Church with its property. The church joined the Convocation of Anglicans in North America, affiliated with the Church of Nigeria, and the Diocese of CANA East, which eventually became the Diocese of the Living Word.

== Architecture ==
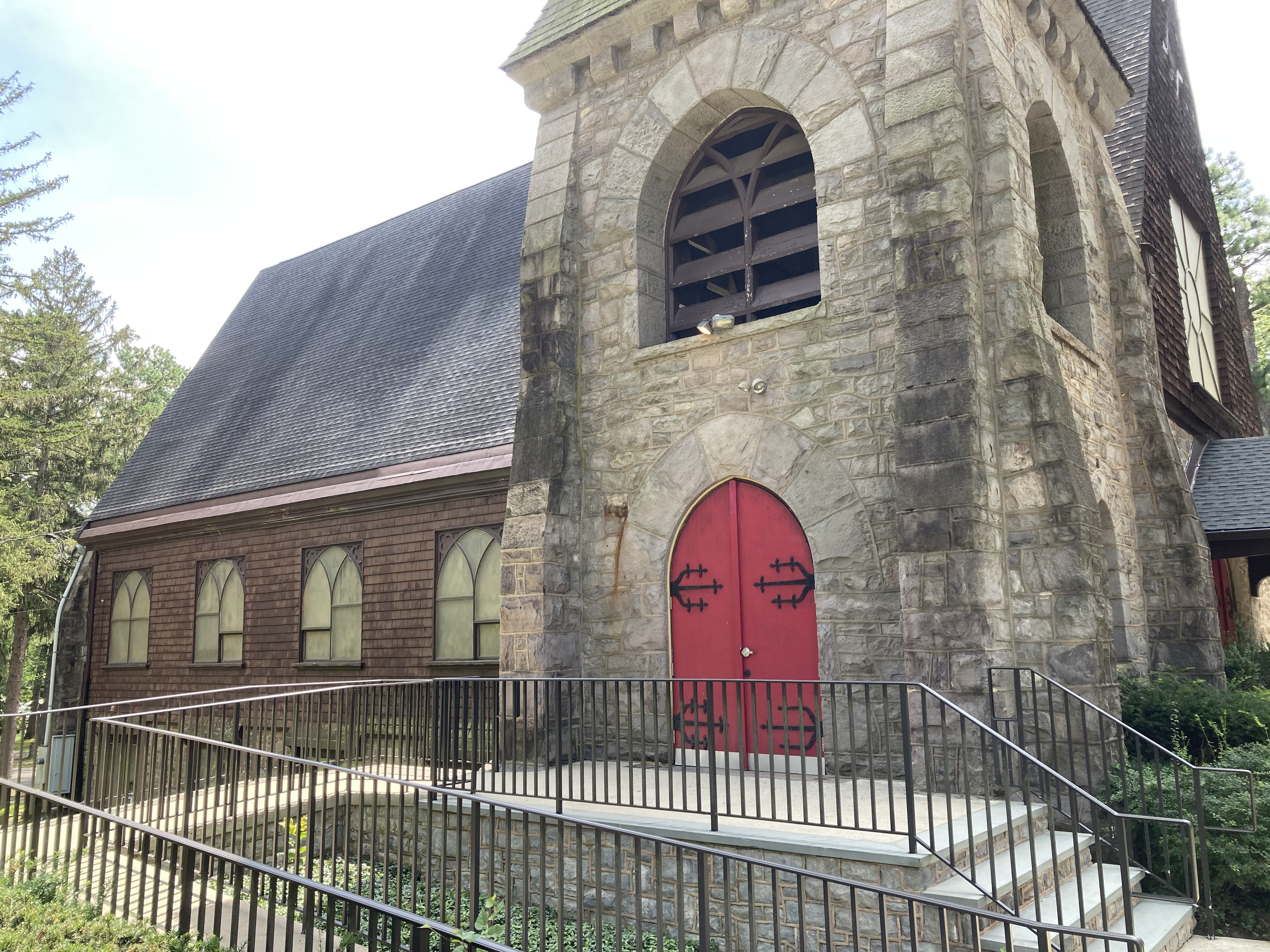
A view of the steeple and north wall of St. George's Anglican Church.

The G.W. Helme Snuff Mill Historic District is a classic example of a late 1800s mill town. St. George's is today a contributing property to the historic district, which was named to the New Jersey Register of Historic Places on February 1, 1980, and to the National Register of Historic Places listings in Middlesex County, New Jersey, on August 15, 1980.

The NRHP nomination for the district describes St. George's exterior as a "somewhat awkward, idiosyncratic variation on Queen Anne gothic," with stone gable-end walls, shingled side walls, a stone side tower and lancet arch windows.
