= George Washington Helme =

American lawyer (1822–1893)

George Washington Helme (May 18, 1822 – June 16, 1893) was the founder of Helmetta, New Jersey.

== Early life and family ==
Helme, born in Kingston, Pennsylvania, USA, was the ninth child and fifth son of Major Oliver Helme (descendant of an old Rhode Island family begun by Christopher Helme) by his second wife Sarah Pease Fish.

As a young man George Helme obtained a clerkship with Asa Packer, a wealthy contractor involved in the construction of locks, boats, and railroads for the transport of coal (and who eventually founded Lehigh University). In his mid-twenties, Helme resigned his position with Mr. Packer and moved to Louisiana, where his older brother Samuel was living. There he studied law and was admitted to the bar in New Orleans around 1851, subsequently establishing his own law practice, which he continued until the outbreak of the American Civil War.

He returned north to marry Margaret Appleby in 1856 in Spotswood, New Jersey. Their first two children, daughters, were born before the Civil War. The first child, born in New Jersey in 1857, died a year later. Their second child was born in New Jersey in 1859. Their third child was born in Chatawa, Mississippi (about 100 miles north of New Orleans) in 1862, just after war broke out. Their last child, a son, was born after the war in 1866 in New Jersey.

His daughter, Olivia "Etta" Antoinette, married lawyer, John Warne Herbert Jr., who played in the first ever college football game as a member of the Rutgers football team.

== Civil War ==
Helme left his law practice and enlisted in the Confederate States Army on March 8, 1862, in New Orleans as a captain in the Crescent Regiment, commanding Company G, Marion Rangers, nicknamed the Ruggles Guards. The regiment went immediately to Corinth, Mississippi, to reinforce General P. G. T. Beauregard's army. On April 6, 1862, the regiment played an important role in the capture of two Federal divisions during the Battle of Shiloh. The regiment commander's report of the engagement cited Captain Helme as "among the line officers I have great satisfaction in mentioning ... as distinguished for coolness, bravery, and the faithful discharge of their duty..." The regiment was disbanded on June 3, 1862, at the expiration of its 90-day enlistment, most of the men being transferred into the 18th Louisiana Regiment.

Captain Helme resigned on June 19, 1862, when he was transferred to the mining service of the Trans-Mississippi Department. This assignment may have been related to an act of April 11, 1862, establishing the "Niter and Mining Bureau", which was charged with the securing of niter (saltpeter) for the manufacture of gunpowder, copper, lead, iron, coal, zinc, and other such materials as might be required for the prosecution of the war.

The bureau opened new coalfields in North Carolina and Alabama and coordinated the flow of mineral fuel to Confederate naval stations along the coast. A corps of officers was established for this purpose. Captain Helme's earlier experience back in Pennsylvania working for Asa Packer may have influenced this assignment. On June 9, 1864, another act was passed which increased the rank of the officers involved. There is nothing in the early Confederate records to indicate that Helme was anything other than a captain, although later biographical sketches identify him as a major general. (His son-in-law, Charles Godfrey Strater, identified him as a Major in a private family document printed in 1928.)

When the war ended, Helme returned north, to New Jersey and New York City, where he engaged in the real estate business for several years, acquiring considerable property.

== Helmetta: Snuff town ==
In 1866 he formed a co-partnership with his brother-in-law Jacob Appleby, for the manufacture of snuff and tobacco. George's father-in-law, Leonard Appleby, owned a snuff mill in Spotswood, New Jersey, the ''Railroad Mill',' which they used for their enterprise. The partnership with Jacob lasted until 1877 or 1878, when Helme became the full owner of his own enterprise, naming it the George W. Helme Tobacco Company, and one of the largest snuff producers in the country. During the middle 1880s he purchased land between Spotswood and Jamesburg, New Jersey on which his mill and 105 homes for workers were built. This area, initially known as Railroad Mills, became Helmetta, New Jersey, and was reputedly named after his youngest daughter Olivia Antoinette, whose nickname was Etta.

The Helmetta area where the Helme Snuff Mill was located is now known as the G.W. Helme Snuff Mill Historic District, which was named to the New Jersey Register of Historic Places on February 1, 1980, and to the National Register of Historic Places, on August 15, 1980.

At the time of Helme's death Helmetta had a population of five hundred persons, and five factories employing over three hundred persons, many from Spotswood and Jamesburg. For ten years Helme was a member of the board of trustees of the State Reform School at Jamesburg and president of the board for eight years. His family was influential in establishing St. George's Episcopal Church in Helmetta.

== Death ==
He died in 1893 in Helmetta, aged 71, of a heart attack. A special car of the Pennsylvania Railroad left Jersey City for the benefit of those wishing to attend the funeral services. The Camden Post (Camden, New Jersey) reported that 1,500 persons attended. The funeral procession of almost 500, some in horse-drawn carriages, some walking, made its way south to nearby Fernwood Cemetery in Jamesburg, where he was buried in the Helme Mausoleum, the largest in the cemetery, located on the highest point of ground. He was reported to have been the second wealthiest man in the state.

He was survived by his wife and three children. A grandson was painter Henry Hyacinth Strater.
