= Helmetta, New Jersey =

Borough in Middlesex County, New Jersey, US

- Borough
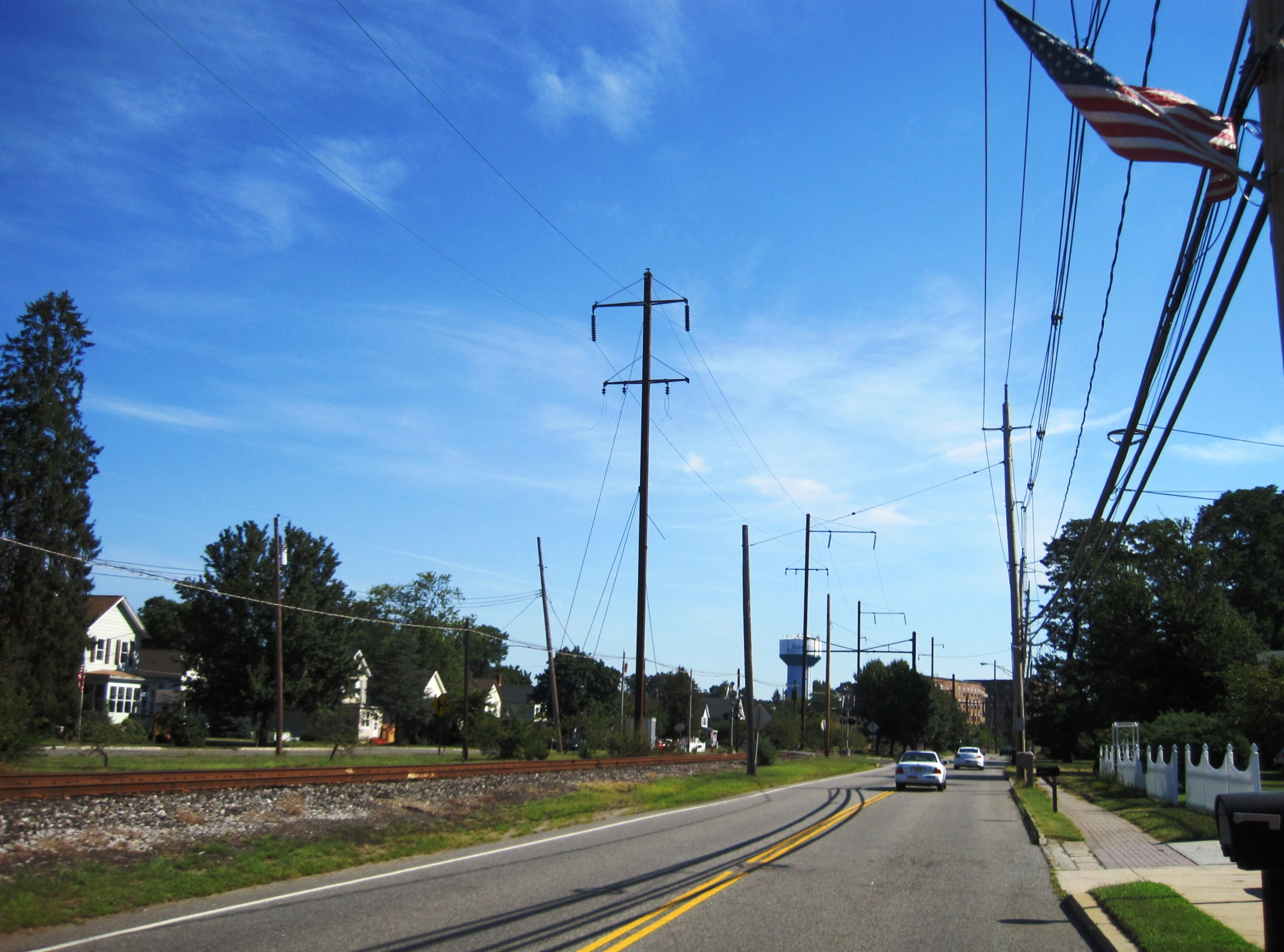
- Looking north along Main Street (CR 615)

- Seal

- Location of Helmetta in Middlesex County highlighted in red (left). Inset map: Location of Middlesex County in New Jersey highlighted in orange (right).

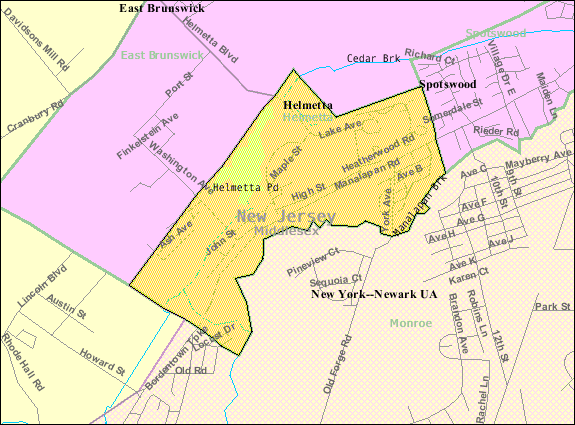
- Census Bureau map of Helmetta, New Jersey

- Location in Middlesex County Location in New Jersey Location in the United States
- Coordinates: 40.378417°N 74.423384°W
- Country: United States
- State: New Jersey
- County: Middlesex
- Incorporated: March 20, 1888
- Named for: Olivia Antoinette "Etta" Helme

Government
  - Type: Borough
  - Body: Borough Council
  - Mayor: Chris Slavicek (I, term ends December 31, 2027)
  - Administrator: Matthew Crane
  - Municipal clerk: Melissa Hallerman

Area
  - Total: 0.88 sq mi (2.27 km^{2})
  - Land: 0.83 sq mi (2.15 km^{2})
  - Water: 0.050 sq mi (0.13 km^{2}) 5.57%
  - Rank: 519th of 565 in state 25th of 25 in county
- Elevation: 59 ft (18 m)

Population (2020)
  - Total: 2,455
  - Estimate (2023): 2,437
  - Rank: 470th of 565 in state 25th of 25 in county
  - Density: 2,963.8/sq mi (1,144.3/km^{2})
  - Rank: 219th of 565 in state 17th of 25 in county
- Time zone: UTC−05:00 (Eastern (EST))
  - Summer (DST): UTC−04:00 (Eastern (EDT))
- ZIP Code: 08828
- Area code: 732
- FIPS code: 3402330840
- GNIS feature ID: 885250
- Website: www.helmettaboro.com

Helmetta is a borough in Middlesex County, in the U.S. state of New Jersey. The borough is located in the heart of the Raritan Valley region, with Manalapan Brook (a Raritan River tributary) flowing through the center of the community. As of the 2020 United States census, the borough's population was 2,455, its highest decennial count ever and an increase of 277 (+12.7%) from the 2010 census count of 2,178, which in turn reflected an increase of 353 (+19.3%) from the 1,825 counted in the 2000 census. The community was established around a snuff mill opened in the 1820s that was acquired by George Washington Helme in the 1880s.

Helmetta was formed as a borough by an act of the New Jersey Legislature on March 20, 1888, when it was created from portions of East Brunswick, based on the results of a referendum held on March 10, 1888. Helmetta's boundary with East Brunswick Township was changed as of March 24, 1897. The borough was named for Helme's daughter, Olivia Antoinette "Etta" Helme.

== History ==
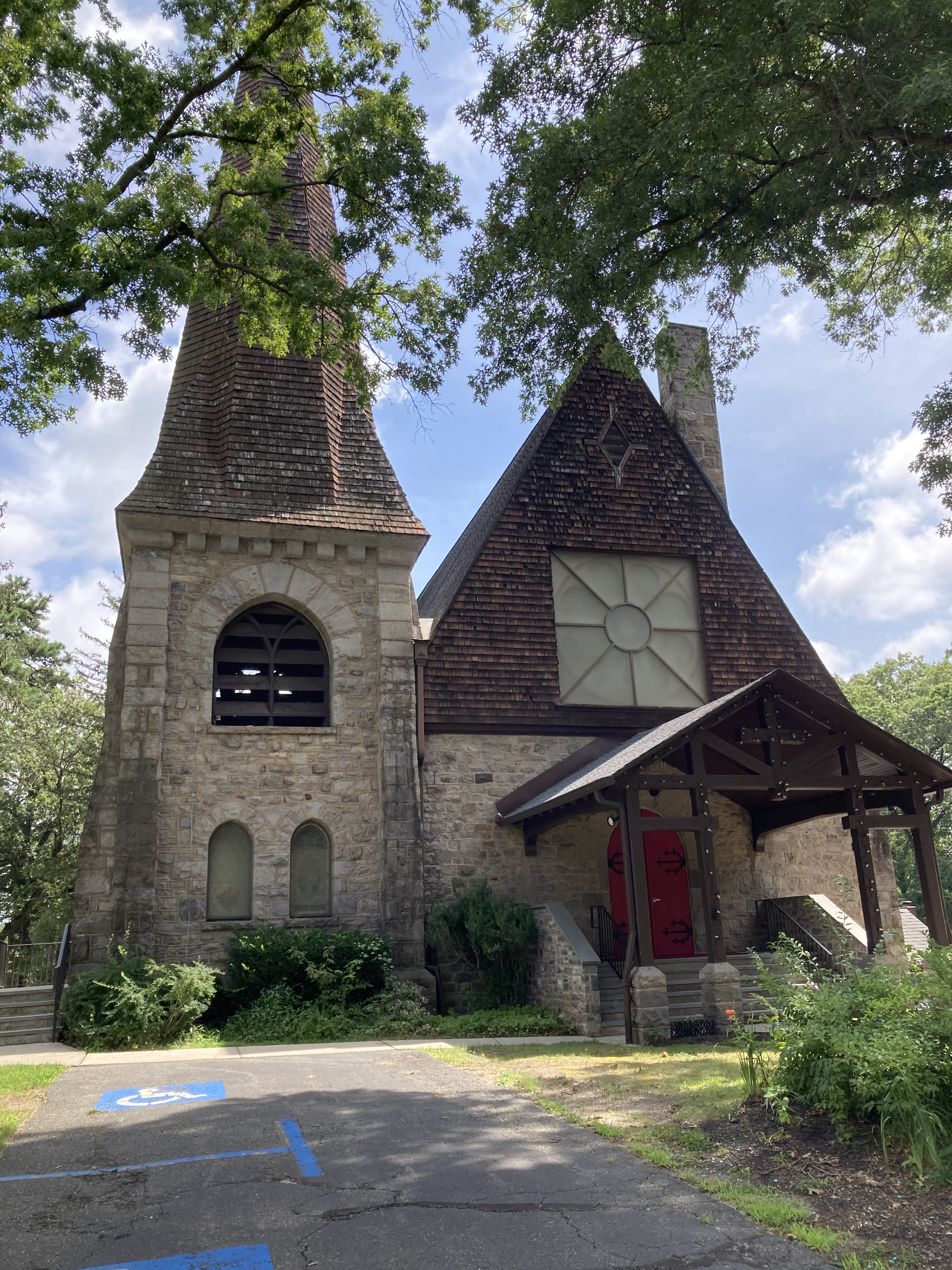
St. George's Anglican Church

=== G.W. Helme Snuff Mill District ===
- G.W. Helme Snuff Mill District
- U.S. National Register of Historic Places
- U.S. Historic district
- New Jersey Register of Historic Places
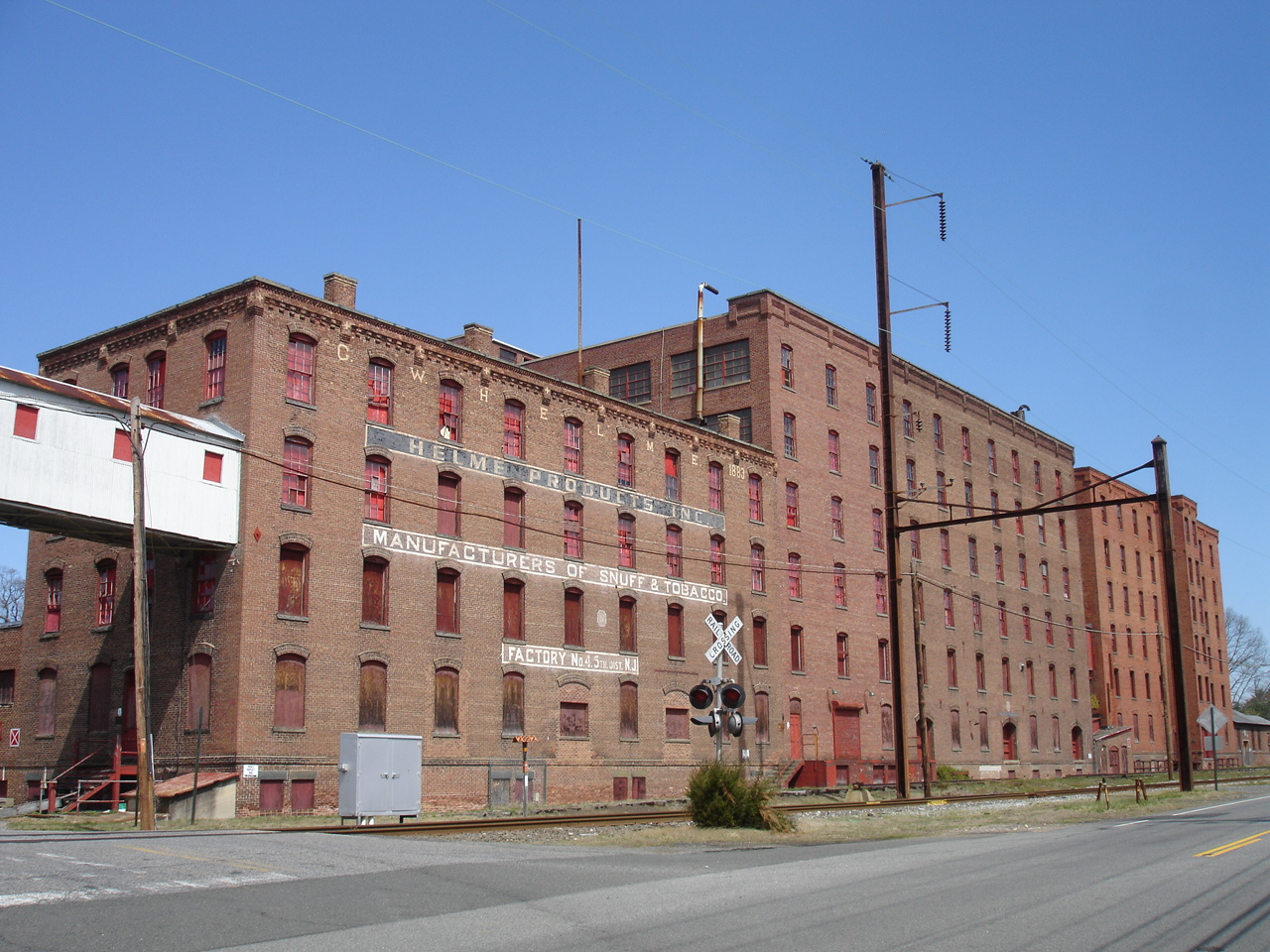
- The Helmetta Snuff Mill in Spring 2012

- Location within Middlesex County, New Jersey Location within New Jersey Location within the United States
- Location: Main Street; Helmetta, New Jersey
- Coordinates: 40°22′39″N 74°25′31″W
- NRHP reference No.: 80002503
- NJRHP No.: 1842

Significant dates
- Added to NRHP: August 15, 1980
- Designated NJRHP: February 1, 1980

Helmetta's main landmark is the large, abandoned Helme Products Inc. plant that sits adjacent to the Camden and Amboy Railroad line running through the borough. The mill began producing snuff in the 1880s. On February 23, 1900, the mill was bought by the American-Sniff Company in a merger with Helme Products Inc., but the merger was dissolved in 1911. In 1925, the mill became the largest of its kind in the world, and by 1934 it employed 400 people. In 1986, the mill was bought out by American Maize-Products. Finally, in 1993, it was purchased by Swisher International, and operations were moved to Wheeling, West Virginia. In 2012, the mill was purchased by Kaplan Companies and was subsequently transformed into an apartment complex. The transformation was completed in 2017.

The G.W. Helme Snuff Mill Historic District is a classic example of a late 1800s mill town. The district consists of the George Washington Helme snuff mill, housing for employees, accessory buildings, St. George's Episcopal Church, Holy Trinity Roman Catholic Church, and Helmetta Pond, which at one time served as a source of power for the mill. About 109 buildings were originally in the district, which was named to the New Jersey Register of Historic Places on February 1, 1980, and to the National Register of Historic Places, on August 15, 1980.

== Geography ==
According to the United States Census Bureau, the borough had a total area of 0.88 square miles (2.27 km^{2}), including 0.83 square miles (2.15 km^{2}) of land and 0.05 square miles (0.13 km^{2}) of water (5.57%).

The borough borders the Middlesex County municipalities of East Brunswick, Monroe Township and Spotswood.

== Demographics ==
Historical population
Census	Pop.	Note	%±
1900	447		—
1910	661		47.9%
1920	687		3.9%
1930	801		16.6%
1940	667		−16.7%
1950	580		−13.0%
1960	779		34.3%
1970	955		22.6%
1980	955		0.0%
1990	1,211		26.8%
2000	1,825		50.7%
2010	2,178		19.3%
2020	2,455		12.7%
2023 (est.)	2,437	▼	−0.7%
Population sources: 1900–1920; 1900–1910 1910–1930 1940–2000; 2000 2010 2020

=== 2020 census ===
As of the 2020 census, Helmetta had a population of 2,455. The median age was 39.1 years. 17.6% of residents were under the age of 18 and 13.0% of residents were 65 years of age or older. For every 100 females there were 93.8 males, and for every 100 females age 18 and over there were 91.4 males age 18 and over.

98.5% of residents lived in urban areas, while 1.5% lived in rural areas.

There were 1,052 households in Helmetta, of which 27.8% had children under the age of 18 living in them. Of all households, 45.6% were married-couple households, 16.9% were households with a male householder and no spouse or partner present, and 27.1% were households with a female householder and no spouse or partner present. About 27.0% of all households were made up of individuals and 6.6% had someone living alone who was 65 years of age or older.

There were 1,091 housing units, of which 3.6% were vacant. The homeowner vacancy rate was 0.7% and the rental vacancy rate was 4.1%.

Racial composition as of the 2020 census
Race	Number	Percent
White	1,949	79.4%
Black or African American	106	4.3%
American Indian and Alaska Native	7	0.3%
Asian	119	4.8%
Native Hawaiian and Other Pacific Islander	4	0.2%
Some other race	77	3.1%
Two or more races	193	7.9%
Hispanic or Latino (of any race)	282	11.5%

=== 2010 census ===
The 2010 United States census counted 2,178 people, 891 households, and 596 families in the borough. The population density was 2,562.9 per square mile (989.5/km^{2}). There were 920 housing units at an average density of 1,082.6 per square mile (418.0/km^{2}). The racial makeup was 88.61% (1,930) White, 3.95% (86) Black or African American, 0.09% (2) Native American, 4.87% (106) Asian, 0.00% (0) Pacific Islander, 1.15% (25) from other races, and 1.33% (29) from two or more races. Hispanic or Latino of any race were 7.53% (164) of the population.

Of the 891 households, 27.8% had children under the age of 18; 52.5% were married couples living together; 10.4% had a female householder with no husband present and 33.1% were non-families. Of all households, 26.0% were made up of individuals and 5.3% had someone living alone who was 65 years of age or older. The average household size was 2.44 and the average family size was 2.97.

20.8% of the population were under the age of 18, 7.1% from 18 to 24, 31.7% from 25 to 44, 30.8% from 45 to 64, and 9.6% who were 65 years of age or older. The median age was 40.3 years. For every 100 females, the population had 93.6 males. For every 100 females ages 18 and older there were 90.2 males.

The Census Bureau's 2006–2010 American Community Survey showed that (in 2010 inflation-adjusted dollars) median household income was $80,690 (with a margin of error of +/− $4,944) and the median family income was $96,875 (+/− $8,073). Males had a median income of $63,625 (+/− $7,838) versus $48,333 (+/− $6,040) for females. The per capita income for the borough was $36,941 (+/− $2,537). About 3.4% of families and 3.7% of the population were below the poverty line, including 5.8% of those under age 18 and 3.2% of those age 65 or over.

=== 2000 census ===
As of the 2000 United States census there were 1,825 people, 746 households, and 495 families residing in the borough. The population density was 2,153.6 inhabitants per square mile (831.5/km^{2}). There were 769 housing units at an average density of 907.5 per square mile (350.4/km^{2}). The racial makeup of the borough was 93.15% White, 2.41% African American, 0.22% Native American, 2.41% Asian, 0.05% Pacific Islander, 0.88% from other races, and 0.88% from two or more races. Hispanic or Latino of any race were 5.32% of the population.

There were 746 households, out of which 33.0% had children under the age of 18 living with them, 54.7% were married couples living together, 8.4% had a female householder with no husband present, and 33.6% were non-families. 25.6% of all households were made up of individuals, and 5.1% had someone living alone who was 65 years of age or older. The average household size was 2.45 and the average family size was 3.01.

In the borough the population was spread out, with 22.1% under the age of 18, 6.5% from 18 to 24, 44.1% from 25 to 44, 21.2% from 45 to 64, and 6.2% who were 65 years of age or older. The median age was 36 years. For every 100 females, there were 98.4 males. For every 100 females age 18 and over, there were 97.2 males.

The median income for a household in the borough was $60,125, and the median income for a family was $64,659. Males had a median income of $47,604 versus $33,929 for females. The per capita income for the borough was $26,668. About 3.2% of families and 3.3% of the population were below the poverty line, including 5.2% of those under age 18 and 1.8% of those age 65 or over.

== Government ==
=== Local government ===
Helmetta is governed under the borough form of New Jersey municipal government, which is used in 218 municipalities (of the 564) statewide, making it the most common form of government in New Jersey. The governing body is comprised of the mayor and the borough council, with all positions elected at-large on a partisan basis as part of the November general election. The mayor is elected directly by the voters to a four-year term of office. The borough council includes six members elected to serve three-year terms on a staggered basis, with two seats coming up for election each year in a three-year cycle. The borough form of government used by Helmetta is a "weak mayor / strong council" government in which council members act as the legislative body with the mayor presiding at meetings and voting only in the event of a tie. The mayor can veto ordinances subject to an override by a two-thirds majority vote of the council. The mayor makes committee and liaison assignments for council members, and most appointments are made by the mayor with the advice and consent of the council.

As of 2026, the mayor of Helmetta Borough is Independent Christopher Slavicek, whose term of office ends December 31, 2027. Members of the Helmetta Borough Council are Council President Peter J. Karczewski (I, 2027), Sandra Bohinski (I, 2026), Michael R. Duffy (I, 2027), Ronald Dzingleski (G, 2025), Joseph Reid (G, 2025) and Nicholas Stasi (I, 2026).

Samuel Mena was appointed in September 2021 to fill the seat expiring in December 2023 that had been held by Noreen Carolan-Genthe and Nicholas Stasi was appointed in October 2021 to fill the seat formerly held by Joseph Perez and also expiring in December 2021. Both Mena and Stasi will serve on an interim basis until the November 2021 general election when voters will select candidates to serve the balance of the terms of office.

In January 2016, Ronald Dzingleski and Joseph Reid were appointed to fill two of the three vacant council seats.

In April 2016, the borough council selected Noreen Carolan to fill the term expiring in December 2016 that had been held temporarily by Brian Hackett who had in turn been appointed to fill the seat held by Yvette Bruno.

In 2014, a recording of a police officer telling a cameraperson stating that he has the constitutional right to take video that he doesn't "give a damn" about constitutional rights was made public. In response, the city government proposed an ordinance banning video and photography inside public buildings without a permit.

In April 2018, Helmetta disbanded its three-officer police force and entered into a six-year shared services agreement with Spotswood to provide police, dispatch and EMS services to Helmetta residents. The Spotswood Police Department is a 24/7 law enforcement agency that serves both Spotswood and Helmetta. The department has 22 officers, 3 full-time dispatchers, and 4 part-time dispatchers, led by Chief Michael Zarro. In July 2022, Helmetta and Jamesburg entered into a six-year shared service contract in which Jamesburg would provide police and dispatch services to Helmetta. This decision came about after the Borough of Spotswood decided that providing dispatch services to Helmetta was not economically viable.

In 2018, the borough had an average property tax bill of $6,270, the lowest in the county, compared to an average bill of $8,092 in Middlesex County and $8,767 statewide.

=== Federal, state and county representation ===
Helmetta is located in the 12th Congressional District and is part of New Jersey's 12th state legislative district.

For the 119th United States Congress, New Jersey's 12th congressional district is represented by Bonnie Watson Coleman (D, Ewing Township). New Jersey is represented in the United States Senate by Democrats Cory Booker (Newark, term ends 2027) and Andy Kim (Moorestown, term ends 2031).

For the 2026–2027 session, the 12th legislative district of the New Jersey Legislature is represented in the State Senate by Owen Henry (R, Old Bridge Township) and in the General Assembly by Robert D. Clifton (R, Matawan) and Alex Sauickie (R, Jackson Township).

Middlesex County is governed by a Board of County Commissioners, whose seven members are elected at-large on a partisan basis to serve three-year terms of office on a staggered basis, with either two or three seats coming up for election each year as part of the November general election. At an annual reorganization meeting held in January, the board selects from among its members a commissioner director and deputy director. As of 2025, Middlesex County's Commissioners (with party affiliation, term-end year, and residence listed in parentheses) are:

Director Ronald G. Rios (D, Carteret, 2027), Deputy Director Shanti Narra (D, North Brunswick, 2027), Claribel A. "Clary" Azcona-Barber (D, New Brunswick, 2025), Charles Kenny (D, Woodbridge Township, 2025), Leslie Koppel (D, Monroe Township, 2026), Chanelle Scott McCullum (D, Piscataway, 2025) and Charles E. Tomaro (D, Edison, 2026).

Constitutional officers are: Clerk Nancy Pinkin (D, 2025, East Brunswick), Sheriff Mildred S. Scott (D, 2025, Piscataway) and Surrogate Claribel Cortes (D, 2026; North Brunswick).

=== Politics ===
As of March 2011, there were a total of 1,399 registered voters in Helmetta, of which 403 (28.8%) were registered as Democrats, 264 (18.9%) were registered as Republicans and 731 (52.3%) were registered as Unaffiliated. There was one voter registered to another party.

United States presidential election results for Helmetta
Year	Republican		Democratic		Third party(ies)	
Year	No.	%	No.	%	No.	%
2024	798	60.96%	476	36.36%	35	2.67%
2020	709	54.71%	560	43.21%	27	2.08%
2016	619	57.74%	420	39.18%	33	3.08%
2012	442	48.15%	463	50.44%	13	1.42%
2008	557	52.65%	480	45.37%	21	1.98%
2004	587	56.61%	442	42.62%	8	0.77%
2000	335	44.85%	378	50.60%	34	4.55%

In the 2012 presidential election, Democrat Barack Obama received 50.4% of the vote (463 cast), ahead of Republican Mitt Romney with 48.1% (442 votes), and other candidates with 1.4% (13 votes), among the 925 ballots cast by the borough's 1,372 registered voters (7 ballots were spoiled), for a turnout of 67.4%. In the 2008 presidential election, Republican John McCain received 52.1% of the vote (557 cast), ahead of Democrat Barack Obama with 44.9% (480 votes) and other candidates with 2.0% (21 votes), among the 1,069 ballots cast by the borough's 1,438 registered voters, for a turnout of 74.3%. In the 2004 presidential election, Republican George W. Bush received 56.2% of the vote (587 ballots cast), outpolling Democrat John Kerry with 42.3% (442 votes) and other candidates with 0.6% (8 votes), among the 1,044 ballots cast by the borough's 1,382 registered voters, for a turnout percentage of 75.5.

Gubernatorial election results for Helmetta
Year	Republican		Democratic		Third party(ies)	
Year	No.	%	No.	%	No.	%
2025	556	56.68%	414	42.20%	11	1.12%
2021	484	61.81%	284	36.27%	15	1.92%
2017	334	57.89%	216	37.44%	27	4.68%
2013	503	71.65%	183	26.07%	16	2.28%
2009	476	68.00%	179	25.57%	45	6.43%
2005	375	49.80%	302	40.11%	76	10.09%

In the 2013 gubernatorial election, Republican Chris Christie received 71.7% of the vote (503 cast), ahead of Democrat Barbara Buono with 26.1% (183 votes), and other candidates with 2.3% (16 votes), among the 718 ballots cast by the borough's 1,374 registered voters (16 ballots were spoiled), for a turnout of 52.3%. In the 2009 gubernatorial election, Republican Chris Christie received 67.5% of the vote (476 ballots cast), ahead of Democrat Jon Corzine with 25.4% (179 votes), Independent Chris Daggett with 4.4% (31 votes) and other candidates with 2.0% (14 votes), among the 705 ballots cast by the borough's 1,402 registered voters, yielding a 50.3% turnout.

United States Senate election results for Helmetta1
Year	Republican		Democratic		Third party(ies)	
Year	No.	%	No.	%	No.	%
2024	721	58.00%	478	38.46%	44	3.54%
2018	476	56.53%	326	38.72%	40	4.75%
2012	426	49.42%	418	48.49%	18	2.09%
2006	339	48.36%	295	42.08%	67	9.56%

United States Senate election results for Helmetta2
Year	Republican		Democratic		Third party(ies)	
Year	No.	%	No.	%	No.	%
2020	681	53.41%	561	44.00%	33	2.59%
2014	288	47.76%	253	41.96%	62	10.28%
2013	204	58.29%	141	40.29%	5	1.43%
2008	488	51.15%	440	46.12%	26	2.73%

== Education ==
All public school students from Helmetta attend the Spotswood Public Schools, with the districts having been consolidated after a July 2009 decision by the New Jersey Department of Education that merged Helmetta into the Spotswood district. Students from Milltown attend the high school as part of a sending/receiving relationship with the Milltown Public Schools.

The Spotswood Public Schools serve students in pre-kindergarten through twelfth grade. As of the 2020–21 school year, the district, comprised of four schools, had an enrollment of 1,610 students and 136.5 classroom teachers (on an FTE basis), for a student–teacher ratio of 11.8:1. Schools in the district (with 2020–21 enrollment data from the National Center for Education Statistics) are G. Austin Schoenly Elementary School with 207 students in grades PreK–1, E. Raymond Appleby Elementary School with 334 students in grades 2–5, Spotswood Memorial Middle School with 349 students in grades 6–8 and Spotswood High School with 692 students in grades 9–12.

Eighth grade students from all of Middlesex County are eligible to apply to attend the high school programs offered by the Middlesex County Magnet Schools, a county-wide vocational school district that offers full-time career and technical education at its schools in East Brunswick, Edison, Perth Amboy, Piscataway and Woodbridge Township, with no tuition charged to students for attendance.

== Transportation ==
=== Roads and highways ===
As of May 2010, the borough had a total of 8.79 miles (14.15 km) of roadways, of which 7.28 miles (11.72 km) were maintained by the municipality and 1.51 miles (2.43 km) by Middlesex County.

The major thoroughfare in the borough is Main Street (County Route 615) which connects with Monroe to the southwest and Spotswood to the northeast. Main Street is largely known as Bordentown-Amboy Turnpike between Jamesburg and South Amboy.

The New Jersey Turnpike (Interstate 95) is accessible at Exit 8A in neighboring Monroe Township.

An analysis of speeding tickets issued over an 18-month period between 2011 and 2013 showed that 222 tickets were issued in that timeframe, of which two had been given to borough residents, which was cited as supporting claims that the borough's police department was unfairly targeting non-residents.

=== Public transportation ===
Middlesex County Area Transit (MCAT) shuttles provide service to and from Helmetta on routes operating across the county. The M2 Route connects Jamesburg, Helmetta and Spotswood with East Brunswick including the Brunswick Square Mall.

== Notable people ==
People who were born in, residents of, or otherwise closely associated with Helmetta include:

- George Washington Helme (1822–1893), founder of Helmetta
- John Warne Herbert Jr. (1853–1934), lawyer who served as mayor of Helmetta and was a member of the Rutgers team in the first-ever college football game
