= Swisher (company) =

American tobacco company

- Industry: Tobacco products
- Founded: 1861; 165 years ago
- Founder: David Swisher
- Headquarters: Jacksonville, Florida, USA
- Products: Cigars; Smokeless Tobacco

Swisher (formerly Swisher International Inc.) is an American international tobacco company.

Swisher has manufactured products since 1861 and ships more than two billion cigars a year to more than 70 countries. The company operates worldwide, with its headquarters in Jacksonville, Florida. It has manufacturing facilities in Santiago, Dominican Republic and Wheeling, West Virginia.

== History ==
Swisher was founded in 1861 in Newark, Ohio by David Swisher. It is based in Jacksonville, Florida. In 1958, the machine-manufactured Swisher Sweets brand was introduced, and by 1964, the company was making four million cigars a day that were being shipped to all 50 states and to 47 foreign countries.

Swisher acquired Universal Cigar in 1986, maker of the low-priced machine-rolled Optimo.

In 1966, Swisher was purchased by William Ziegler III's American Maize-Products and he became chairman of the company, where he remained until his death in 2008. He was CEO by 1992 and changed the name to Swisher International. By 1995 Ziegler sold his American Maize-Products and kept (or bought back) Swisher, then took it public as Swisher International Group in December 1996.

Golfer Bob Duval was endorsing the brand in 1998.

In 2014, Swisher acquired Miami-based Drew Estate Tobacco Company. John Drew had started the company in 1996 with a 16 square feet (1.5 m^{2}) stall at the World Trade Center. The Drew brand went through some upheaval after the acquisition, and John Drew was brought back as its president in 2016.

President and CEO Peter Ghiloni, retired from Swisher in 2018. John Miller was named as president to replace Ghiloni.

In August 2020, Swisher International, Inc. announced the rebranding to Swisher.

In 2024, Swisher rebranded its smokeless tobacco brand to the historic Helme Tobacco Company. Swisher President & Chief Executive Officer, Neil Kiely, stated that, “The Helme name is synonymous with high-quality products, and reflects the unwavering commitment of the Wheeling, West Virginia, team.”

In 2025, Swisher launched Volt+Co, a sub-brand dedicated to caffeine focused products, in particular their Mojo brand caffeine pouches derived from green tea.. Mojo started with 50mg pouches, but in August 2026 they added 100mg varieties.

== See also ==
- List of cigar brands
