= Washington Canal =

Washington Canal may refer to:

- Washington Canal (New Jersey), a waterway connecting the South River with the Raritan River
- Washington City Canal in Washington, D.C. (19th century)
