= Manalapan =

Manalapan may refer to some places in the United States:

- Manalapan, Florida
- Manalapan Brook, a tributary of the South River (Raritan River tributary) in New Jersey
- Manalapan Township, New Jersey
