= Matchaponix =

Matchaponix may refer to:

- Matchaponix, New Jersey
- Matchaponix Brook
