= Spotswood, New Jersey =

Borough in Middlesex County, New Jersey, US

- Borough
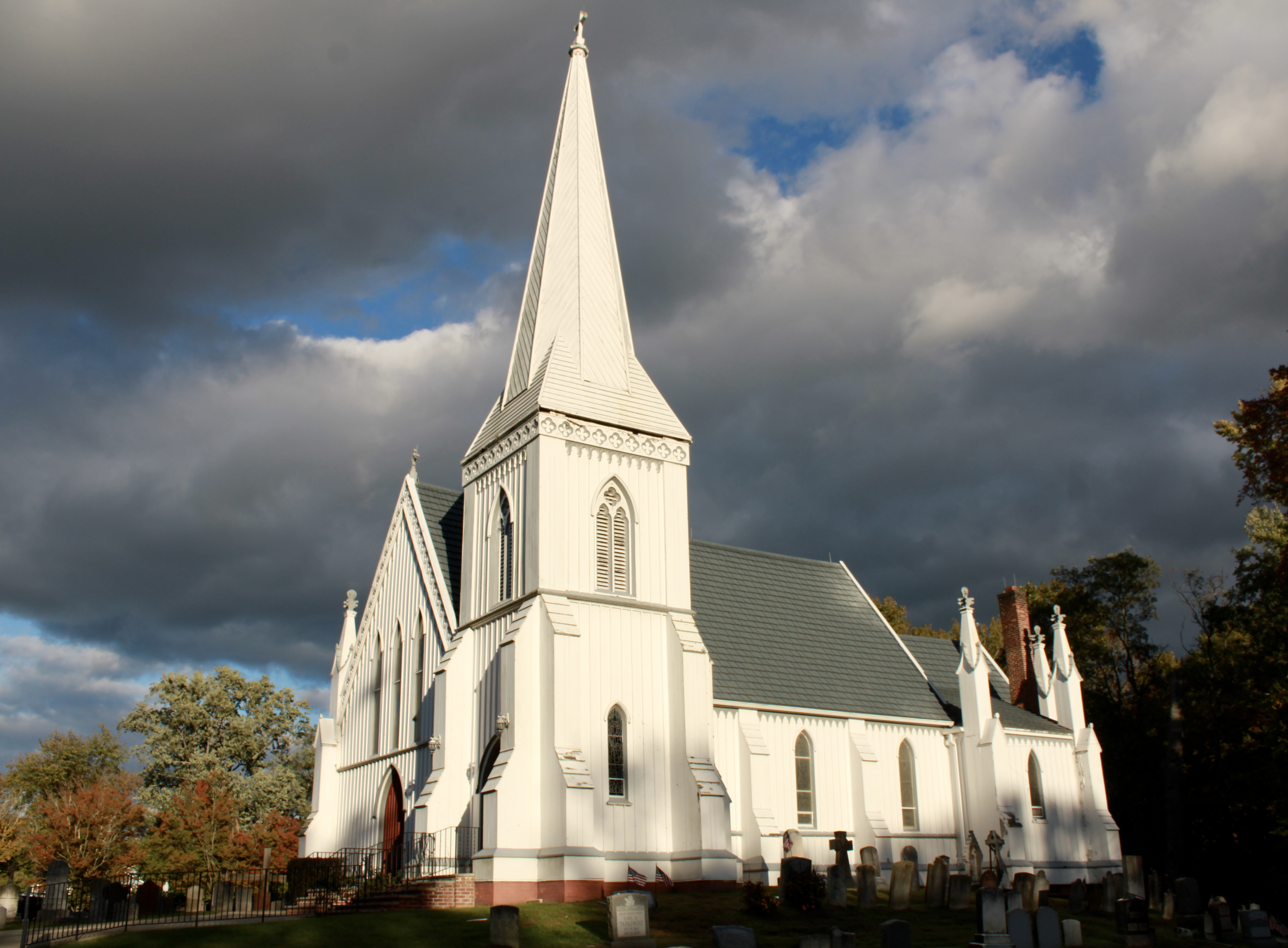
- St. Peter's Church

- Seal

- Location of Spotswood in Middlesex County highlighted in red (left). Inset map: Location of Middlesex County in New Jersey highlighted in orange (right).

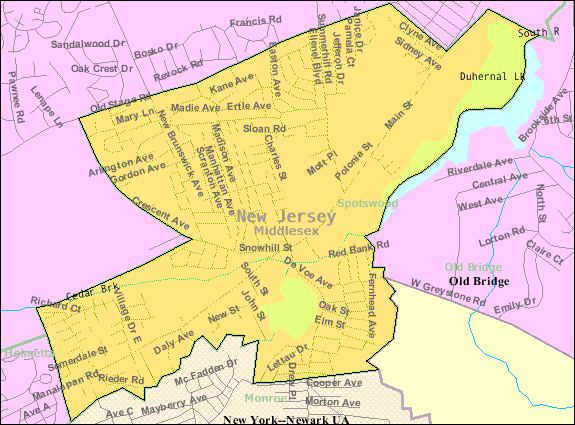
- Census Bureau map of Spotswood, New Jersey

- Location in Middlesex County Location in New Jersey Location in the United States
- Coordinates: 40.393613°N 74.392737°W
- Country: United States
- State: New Jersey
- County: Middlesex
- Incorporated: May 12, 1908

Government
  - Type: Faulkner Act (mayor–council)
  - Body: Borough Council
  - Mayor: Rich O'Brien
  - Administrator: Brandon Umba
  - Municipal clerk: Jenny Servis (acting)

Area
  - Total: 2.42 sq mi (6.27 km^{2})
  - Land: 2.31 sq mi (5.99 km^{2})
  - Water: 0.11 sq mi (0.28 km^{2}) 4.46%
  - Rank: 380th of 565 in state 20th of 25 in county
- Elevation: 36 ft (11 m)

Population (2020)
  - Total: 8,163
  - Estimate (2023): 8,078
  - Rank: 288th of 565 in state 20th of 25 in county
  - Density: 3,538.4/sq mi (1,366.2/km^{2})
  - Rank: 191st of 565 in state 15th of 25 in county
- Time zone: UTC−05:00 (Eastern (EST))
  - Summer (DST): UTC−04:00 (Eastern (EDT))
- ZIP Code: 08884
- Area code: 732
- FIPS code: 3402369810
- GNIS feature ID: 0885405
- Website: www.spotswoodboro.com

Spotswood is a borough in Middlesex County, in the U.S. state of New Jersey. The community is nestled within the heart of the Raritan Valley region, with the Manalapan Brook and Matchaponix Brook forming the confluence of the South River (a Raritan River tributary) inside the borough. As of the 2020 United States census, the borough's population was 8,163, a decrease of 94 (−1.1%) from the 2010 census count of 8,257, which in turn reflected an increase of 377 (+4.8%) from the 7,880 counted in the 2000 census.

== History ==
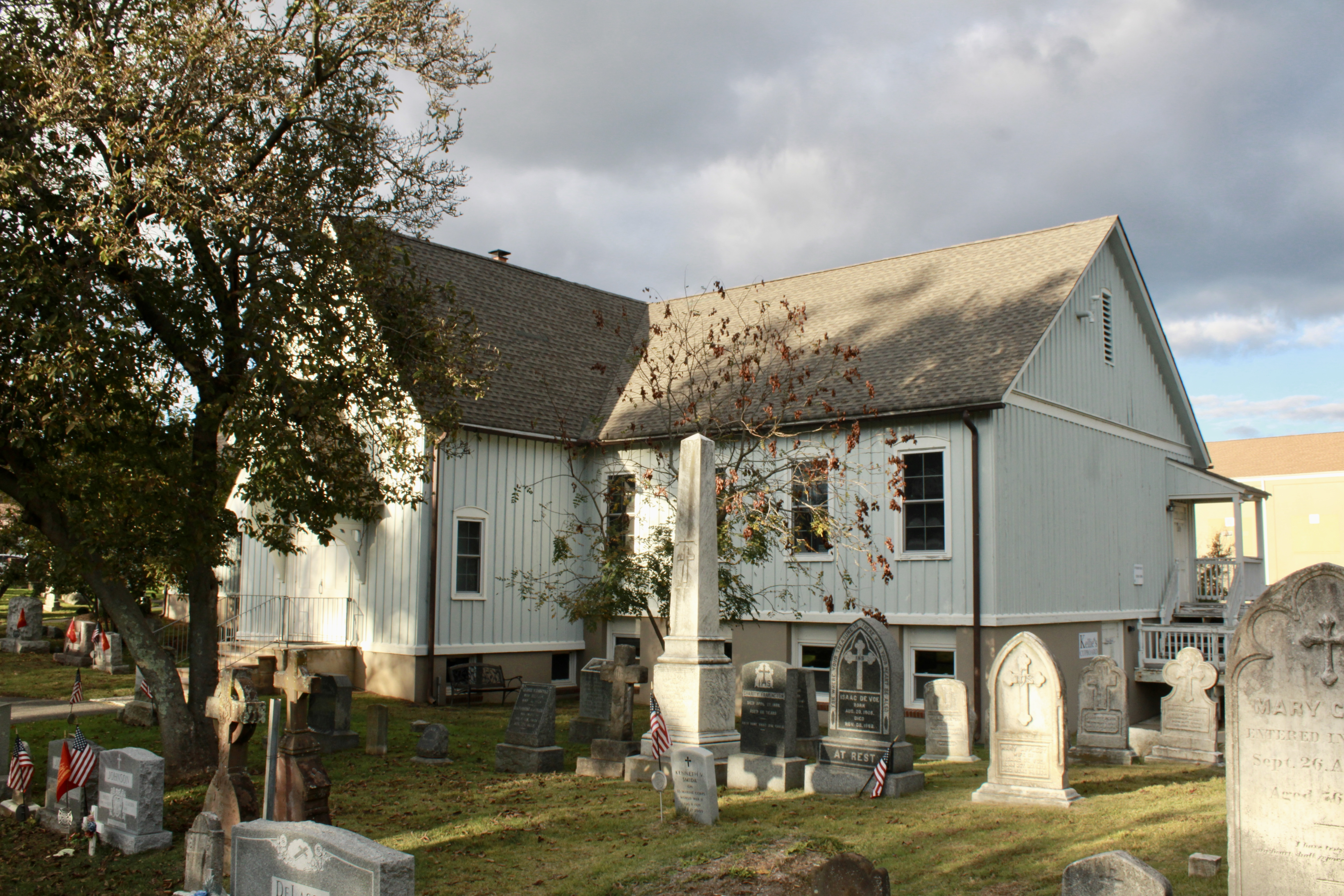
Graveyard on the premises of St. Peter's Church

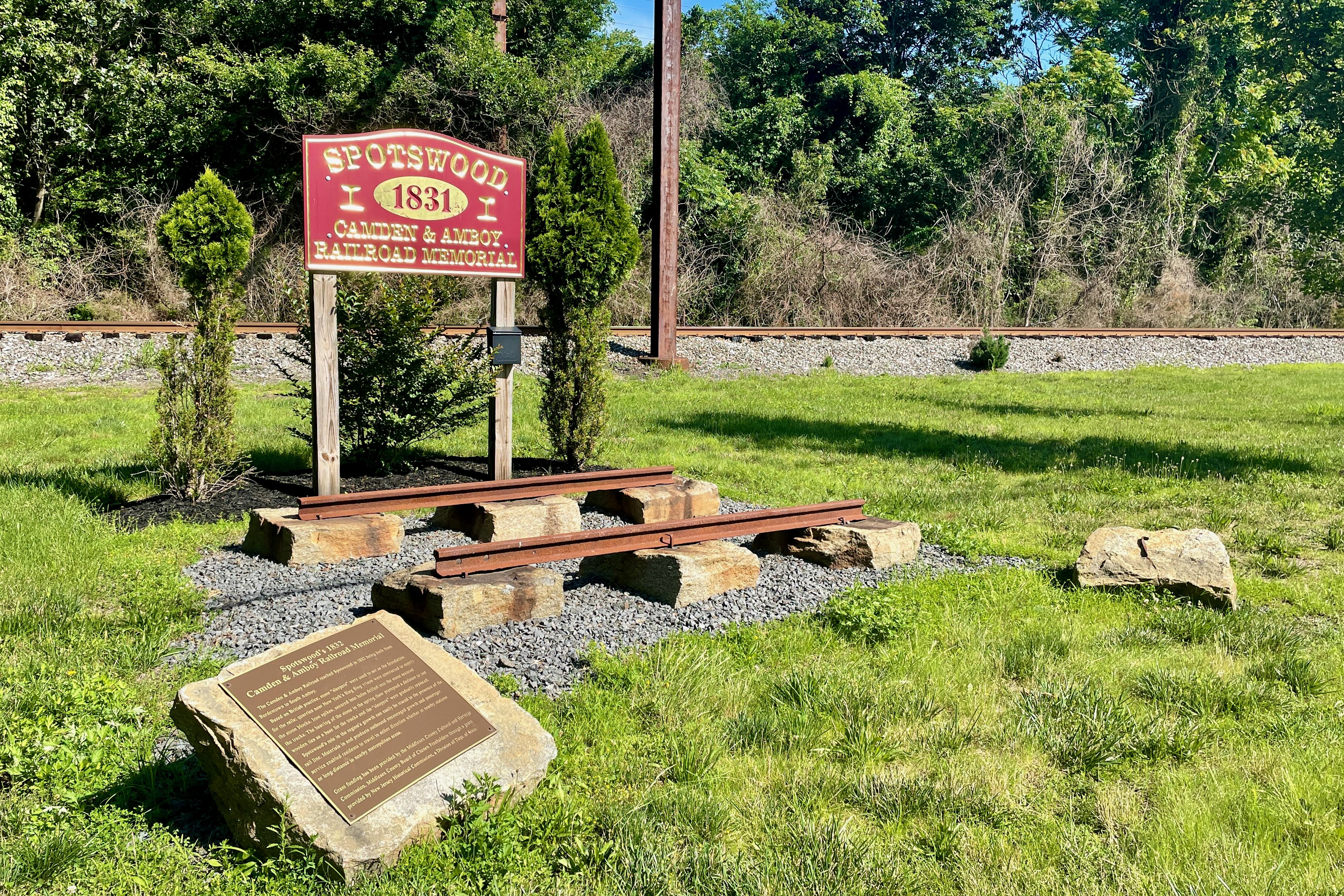
Camden and Amboy Railroad Memorial near East Spotswood Park

Its first settler James Johnston originally called the place "Spottiswoode", named for his old place of residence in Scotland, and dates back to its original settlement in 1685. It was also historically spelled Spottswood.

The Bordentown and South Amboy Turnpike, a stagecoach route built in 1816, passed through Spotswood. The Camden and Amboy Railroad, chartered in 1830, followed this stagecoach route and reached Spotswood in 1832. It used stone sleepers to support the track. The locomotive, John Bull, operated on the railroad. A trackside memorial is located near East Spotswood Park. In addition to the Spotswood station, Outcalt and East Spotswood had passenger and freight stations on the Pennsylvania Railroad, the United New Jersey Railroad and Canal Company subsidiary.

Spotswood was incorporated as a borough by an act of the New Jersey Legislature on April 15, 1908, from portions of East Brunswick Township, based on the passage of a referendum held on May 12, 1908.

== Geography ==
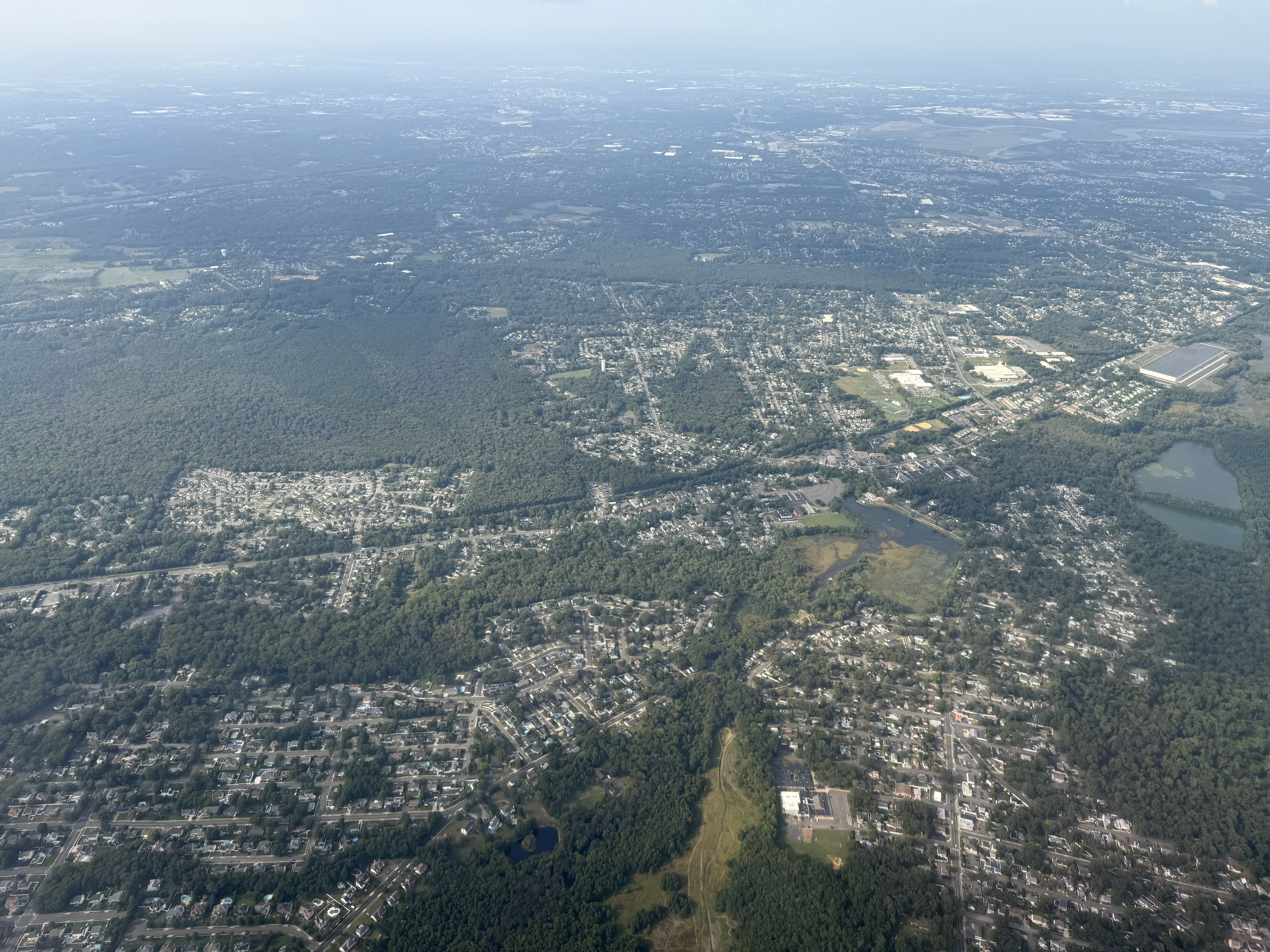
Aerial view of Spotswood

According to the United States Census Bureau, the borough had a total area of 2.42 square miles (6.3 km^{2}), including 2.31 square miles (6.0 km^{2}) of land and 0.11 square miles (0.28 km^{2}) of water (4.46%).

Unincorporated communities, localities and place names located partially or completely within the borough include Outcalt, which is located along the border of Spotswood and Monroe Township.

The borough borders the Middlesex County municipalities of East Brunswick, Helmetta, Monroe Township and Old Bridge Township.

== Demographics ==
Historical population
Census	Pop.	Note	%±
1910	623		—
1920	704		13.0%
1930	921		30.8%
1940	1,201		30.4%
1950	2,325		93.6%
1960	5,788		148.9%
1970	7,891		36.3%
1980	7,840		−0.6%
1990	7,983		1.8%
2000	7,880		−1.3%
2010	8,257		4.8%
2020	8,163		−1.1%
2023 (est.)	8,078	▼	−1.0%
Population sources: 1910–1920; 1910 1910–1930; 1940–2000 2000; 2010 2020

=== 2020 census ===
As of the 2020 census, Spotswood had a population of 8,163. The median age was 45.0 years. 18.6% of residents were under the age of 18 and 20.1% of residents were 65 years of age or older. For every 100 females there were 95.2 males, and for every 100 females age 18 and over there were 91.5 males age 18 and over.

100.0% of residents lived in urban areas, while 0.0% lived in rural areas.

There were 3,196 households in Spotswood, of which 27.7% had children under the age of 18 living in them. Of all households, 53.4% were married-couple households, 15.2% were households with a male householder and no spouse or partner present, and 26.8% were households with a female householder and no spouse or partner present. About 26.6% of all households were made up of individuals and 14.5% had someone living alone who was 65 years of age or older.

There were 3,297 housing units, of which 3.1% were vacant. The homeowner vacancy rate was 1.2% and the rental vacancy rate was 2.8%.

Racial composition as of the 2020 census
Race	Number	Percent
White	6,341	77.7%
Black or African American	295	3.6%
American Indian and Alaska Native	11	0.1%
Asian	528	6.5%
Native Hawaiian and Other Pacific Islander	0	0.0%
Some other race	279	3.4%
Two or more races	709	8.7%
Hispanic or Latino (of any race)	917	11.2%

=== 2010 census ===
The 2010 United States census counted 8,257 people, 3,128 households, and 2,143 families in the borough. The population density was 3,642.2 per square mile (1,406.3/km^{2}). There were 3,242 housing units at an average density of 1,430.1 per square mile (552.2/km^{2}). The racial makeup was 88.63% (7,318) White, 2.98% (246) Black or African American, 0.11% (9) Native American, 5.14% (424) Asian, 0.01% (1) Pacific Islander, 1.27% (105) from other races, and 1.87% (154) from two or more races. Hispanic or Latino of any race were 8.32% (687) of the population.

Of the 3,128 households, 29.3% had children under the age of 18; 55.0% were married couples living together; 9.7% had a female householder with no husband present and 31.5% were non-families. Of all households, 27.1% were made up of individuals and 15.1% had someone living alone who was 65 years of age or older. The average household size was 2.56 and the average family size was 3.16.

21.1% of the population were under the age of 18, 6.9% from 18 to 24, 24.3% from 25 to 44, 28.8% from 45 to 64, and 18.9% who were 65 years of age or older. The median age was 43.5 years. For every 100 females, the population had 91.7 males. For every 100 females ages 18 and older there were 86.1 males.

The Census Bureau's 2006–2010 American Community Survey showed that (in 2010 inflation-adjusted dollars) median household income was $70,360 (with a margin of error of +/− $9,861) and the median family income was $90,652 (+/− $8,741). Males had a median income of $59,226 (+/− $4,823) versus $43,365 (+/− $4,935) for females. The per capita income for the borough was $31,249 (+/− $1,696). About 2.5% of families and 3.3% of the population were below the poverty line, including 0.7% of those under age 18 and 6.4% of those age 65 or over.

=== 2000 census ===
As of the 2000 United States census there were 7,880 people, 3,099 households, and 2,163 families residing in the borough. The population density was 3,389.8 people per square mile (1,308.8 people/km^{2}). There were 3,158 housing units at an average density of 1,358.5 per square mile (524.5/km^{2}). The racial makeup of the borough was 99.24% White, 0.05% African American, 0.5% Asian, 0.01% Pacific Islander, and 0.20% from two or more races. Hispanic or Latino of any race were 4.38% of the population.

There were 3,099 households, out of which 29.4% had children under the age of 18 living with them, 57.0% were married couples living together, 9.1% had a female householder with no husband present, and 30.2% were non-families. 26.5% of all households were made up of individuals, and 15.6% had someone living alone who was 65 years of age or older. The average household size was 2.54 and the average family size was 3.10.

In the borough the population was spread out, with 22.4% under the age of 18, 6.8% from 18 to 24, 30.1% from 25 to 44, 23.4% from 45 to 64, and 17.4% who were 65 years of age or older. The median age was 40 years. For every 100 females, there were 93.6 males. For every 100 females age 18 and over, there were 89.9 males.

The median income for a household in the borough was $55,833, and the median income for a family was $73,062. Males had a median income of $45,979 versus $35,859 for females. The per capita income for the borough was $25,247. About 2.6% of families and 4.3% of the population were below the poverty line, including 5.4% of those under age 18 and 2.9% of those age 65 or over.

== Parks and recreation ==
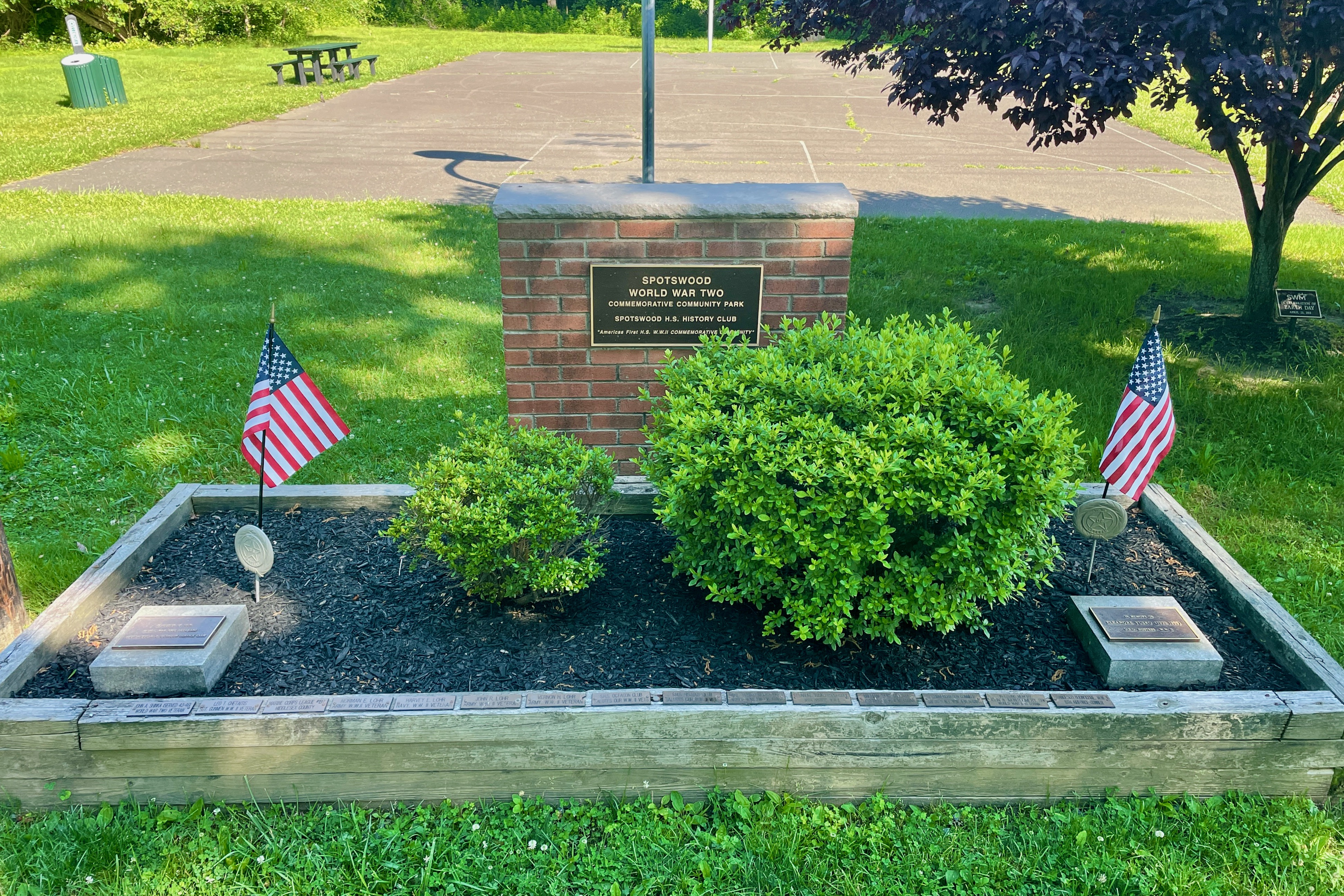
World War Two Memorial at East Spotswood Park

Tennis courts are located on Summerhill Road. Spotswood parks are located on Rieder Road, Mundy Avenue, Michael Road, and East Spotswood. A World War Two Memorial is located in the East Spotswood Park.

== Government ==
=== Local government ===
The Borough of Spotswood operates within the Faulkner Act (formally known as the Optional Municipal Charter Law of 1950) under the Mayor-Council (Plan B), implemented based on the recommendations of a Charter Study Commission as of July 1, 1976. The borough is one of 71 municipalities (of the 564) statewide that use this form of government. The governing body is comprised of the mayor and the five-member borough council, who are chosen at-large to four-year terms of office on a non-partisan basis in elections held on a staggered basis in even-numbered years as part of the November general election. Three council seats are up for election together and then two council seats and the mayoral seat are up for vote two years later. The mayor is the chief executive and has responsibility for the administration of the government. The legislative power resides solely within the borough council. There is separation of legislative and executive power in this form of government.

As of 2024, the Mayor of Spotswood is Jackie Palmer, whose term of office ends December 31, 2024. Members of the Borough Council are Council President Nicholas Legakis (2026), William Lawrence "Larry" Kraemer (2026), Edward Lesko (2024), Dawn Schwartz (2026) and Andrew Zaborney (2024; elected to serve an unexpired term).

In the 2022 borough elections, Kraemer retained his seat, while Legakis and Schwartz joined the council to replace outgoing councilmembers Theodore Ricci (2022) and Charles Spicuzzo (2022). In the 2020 election, Jackie Palmer was elected as the first female mayor, Edward Lesko as the borough's youngest councilmember and Marilyn Israel as the first black councilmember. In August 2022, Andrew Zaborney was sworn in to fill the seat expiring in December 2024 that had been held by Marilyn Israel until she resigned from office.

In May 2015, Councilmember Frank LoSacco resigned from office from a term expiring in December 2016. In the November 2015 general election, Leo Servis was elected to serve the balance of the term of office and was sworn in at the December 7, 2015, meeting after the election results were certified.

Citing potential savings of $25,000, Spotswood's council approved a measure in 2010 that would allow the borough to take advantage of new state legislation under which it would to shift its non-partisan municipal elections from May to the November general election, with the first municipal race taking place in November 2012. In the November 2012 general election, Nicholas Poliseno defeated Curtis Stollen in the mayoral race to succeed Thomas W. Barlow, who didn't run for re-election. Council incumbents Frank LoSacco and Edward T. Seely ran unopposed.

==== Law enforcement ====
The Spotswood Police Department is a 24/7 law enforcement agency that serves both Spotswood and Helmetta. The department has 22 officers, 3 full-time dispatchers, and 4 part-time dispatchers, led by Chief Michael Zarro. In April 2018, Helmetta disbanded its three-officer police force and entered into a six-year shared services agreement with Spotswood to provide police, dispatch and EMS services. This six-year agreement ended in July 2022, when Helmetta and Jamesburg entered a six-year shared services agreement.

==== Emergency medical services ====
Spotswood EMS provides 24 hour care to residents. The emergency medical services division was established in 2005 by the Borough of Spotswood.

=== Federal, state and county representation ===
Spotswood is located in the 12th Congressional District and is part of New Jersey's 12th state legislative district.

For the 119th United States Congress, New Jersey's 12th congressional district is represented by Bonnie Watson Coleman (D, Ewing Township). New Jersey is represented in the United States Senate by Democrats Cory Booker (Newark, term ends 2027) and Andy Kim (Moorestown, term ends 2031).

For the 2026–2027 session, the 12th legislative district of the New Jersey Legislature is represented in the State Senate by Owen Henry (R, Old Bridge Township) and in the General Assembly by Robert D. Clifton (R, Matawan) and Alex Sauickie (R, Jackson Township).

Middlesex County is governed by a Board of County Commissioners, whose seven members are elected at-large on a partisan basis to serve three-year terms of office on a staggered basis, with either two or three seats coming up for election each year as part of the November general election. At an annual reorganization meeting held in January, the board selects from among its members a commissioner director and deputy director. As of 2025, Middlesex County's Commissioners (with party affiliation, term-end year, and residence listed in parentheses) are:

Director Ronald G. Rios (D, Carteret, 2027), Deputy Director Shanti Narra (D, North Brunswick, 2027), Claribel A. "Clary" Azcona-Barber (D, New Brunswick, 2025), Charles Kenny (D, Woodbridge Township, 2025), Leslie Koppel (D, Monroe Township, 2026), Chanelle Scott McCullum (D, Piscataway, 2025) and Charles E. Tomaro (D, Edison, 2026).

Constitutional officers are: Clerk Nancy Pinkin (D, 2025, East Brunswick), Sheriff Mildred S. Scott (D, 2025, Piscataway) and Surrogate Claribel Cortes (D, 2026; North Brunswick).

=== Politics ===
As of March 2011, there were a total of 5,119 registered voters in Spotswood, of which 1,485 (29.0%) were registered as Democrats, 965 (18.9%) were registered as Republicans and 2,667 (52.1%) were registered as Unaffiliated. There were 2 voters registered as either Libertarians or Greens.

United States presidential election results for Spotswood
Year	Republican		Democratic		Third party(ies)	
Year	No.	%	No.	%	No.	%
2024	2,736	61.13%	1,642	36.68%	98	2.19%
2020	2,545	57.09%	1,821	40.85%	92	2.06%
2016	2,379	59.95%	1,436	36.19%	153	3.86%
2012	1,764	50.06%	1,712	48.58%	48	1.36%
2008	2,001	52.67%	1,734	45.64%	64	1.68%
2004	2,014	55.51%	1,580	43.55%	34	0.94%
2000	1,473	46.51%	1,572	49.64%	122	3.85%

In the 2012 presidential election, Republican Mitt Romney received 50.1% of the vote (1,764 cast), ahead of Democrat Barack Obama with 48.6% (1,712 votes), and other candidates with 1.4% (48 votes), among the 3,557 ballots cast by the borough's 5,177 registered voters (33 ballots were spoiled), for a turnout of 68.7%. In the 2008 presidential election, Republican John McCain received 52.4% of the vote (2,001 cast), ahead of Democrat Barack Obama with 45.4% (1,734 votes) and other candidates with 1.7% (64 votes), among the 3,820 ballots cast by the borough's 5,217 registered voters, for a turnout of 73.2%. In the 2004 presidential election, Republican George W. Bush received 55.4% of the vote (2,014 ballots cast), outpolling Democrat John Kerry with 43.4% (1,580 votes) and other candidates with 0.7% (34 votes), among the 3,638 ballots cast by the borough's 4,952 registered voters, for a turnout percentage of 73.5.

Gubernatorial election results for Spotswood
Year	Republican		Democratic		Third party(ies)	
Year	No.	%	No.	%	No.	%
2025	1,927	55.98%	1,486	43.17%	29	0.84%
2021	1,631	64.42%	873	34.48%	28	1.11%
2017	1,341	61.23%	792	36.16%	57	2.60%
2013	1,591	70.24%	640	28.26%	34	1.50%
2009	1,627	63.83%	736	28.87%	186	7.30%
2005	1,303	52.37%	1,012	40.68%	173	6.95%

In the 2013 gubernatorial election, Republican Chris Christie received 70.2% of the vote (1,591 cast), ahead of Democrat Barbara Buono with 28.3% (640 votes), and other candidates with 1.5% (34 votes), among the 2,290 ballots cast by the borough's 5,254 registered voters (25 ballots were spoiled), for a turnout of 43.6%. In the 2009 gubernatorial election, Republican Chris Christie received 63.2% of the vote (1,627 ballots cast), ahead of Democrat Jon Corzine with 28.6% (736 votes), Independent Chris Daggett with 6.4% (165 votes) and other candidates with 1.2% (31 votes), among the 2,576 ballots cast by the borough's 5,043 registered voters, yielding a 51.1% turnout.

United States Senate election results for Spotswood1
Year	Republican		Democratic		Third party(ies)	
Year	No.	%	No.	%	No.	%
2024	2,461	58.46%	1,615	38.36%	134	3.18%
2018	1,858	59.38%	1,149	36.72%	122	3.90%
2012	1,653	50.85%	1,535	47.22%	63	1.94%
2006	1,883	66.02%	883	30.96%	86	3.02%

United States Senate election results for Spotswood2
Year	Republican		Democratic		Third party(ies)	
Year	No.	%	No.	%	No.	%
2020	2,378	54.87%	1,797	41.46%	159	3.67%
2014	977	55.73%	727	41.47%	49	2.80%
2013	811	59.99%	522	38.61%	19	1.41%
2008	1,786	51.92%	1,553	45.15%	101	2.94%

== Education ==
The Spotswood Public Schools serve students in pre-kindergarten through twelfth grade. As of the 2020–21 school year, the district, comprised of four schools, had an enrollment of 1,610 students and 136.5 classroom teachers (on an FTE basis), for a student–teacher ratio of 11.8:1. Schools in the district (with 2020–21 enrollment data from the National Center for Education Statistics) are G. Austin Schoenly Elementary School with 207 students in grades PreK–1, E. Raymond Appleby Elementary School with 334 students in grades 2–5, Spotswood Memorial Middle School with 349 students in grades 6–8 and Spotswood High School with 692 students in grades 9–12.

Students from Helmetta, a non-operating district, attend school in Spotswood beginning in grammar school. Students from Milltown attend the high school as part of a sending/receiving relationship with the Milltown Public Schools.

Eighth grade students from all of Middlesex County are eligible to apply to attend the high school programs offered by the Middlesex County Magnet Schools, a county-wide vocational school district that offers full-time career and technical education at its schools in East Brunswick, Edison, Perth Amboy, Piscataway and Woodbridge Township, with no tuition charged to students for attendance.

Immaculate Conception Pre-School (toddler–PreK) and Immaculate Conception School (K–8), which opened in September 1960, operate under the supervision of Roman Catholic Diocese of Metuchen.

== Transportation ==
=== Roads and highways ===
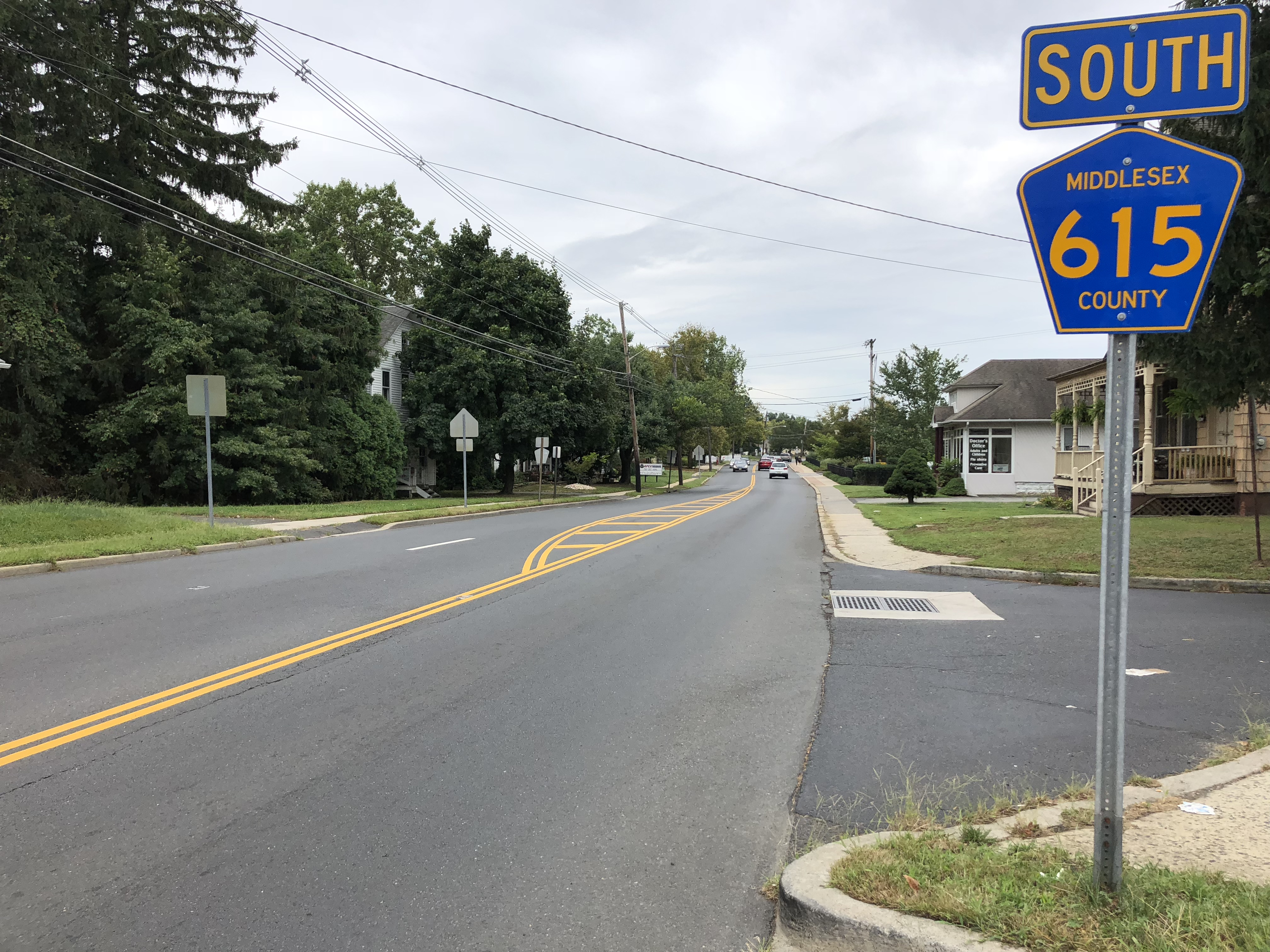
Middlesex County Route 615 (Main Street) in Spotswood

As of July 2015, the borough had a total of 29.51 miles (47.49 km) of roadways, of which 25.52 miles (41.07 km) were maintained by the municipality and 4.07 miles (6.55 km) by Middlesex County.

The main roads that pass through Spotswood include Middlesex County Route 613 (Devoe Avenue / Main Street / Summerhill Road) connecting Monroe Township to the south and East Brunswick Township to the north and Middlesex County Route 615 (Manalapan Road / Main Street) connecting Helmetta in the southwest to East Brunswick Township in the borough's northwest corner.

Both Route 18 and County Route 527 just miss the borough by less than a mile. The closest limited access road is the New Jersey Turnpike (Interstate 95) which is accessible in both neighboring East Brunswick Township (Exit 9) and bordering Monroe Township (Exit 8A).

=== Public transportation ===
NJ Transit provides bus service between the borough and the Port Authority Bus Terminal in Midtown Manhattan on the 138 route.
