= St. Peter's Church and Buildings =

Historic church in New Jersey, United States

- U.S. National Register of Historic Places
- New Jersey Register of Historic Places
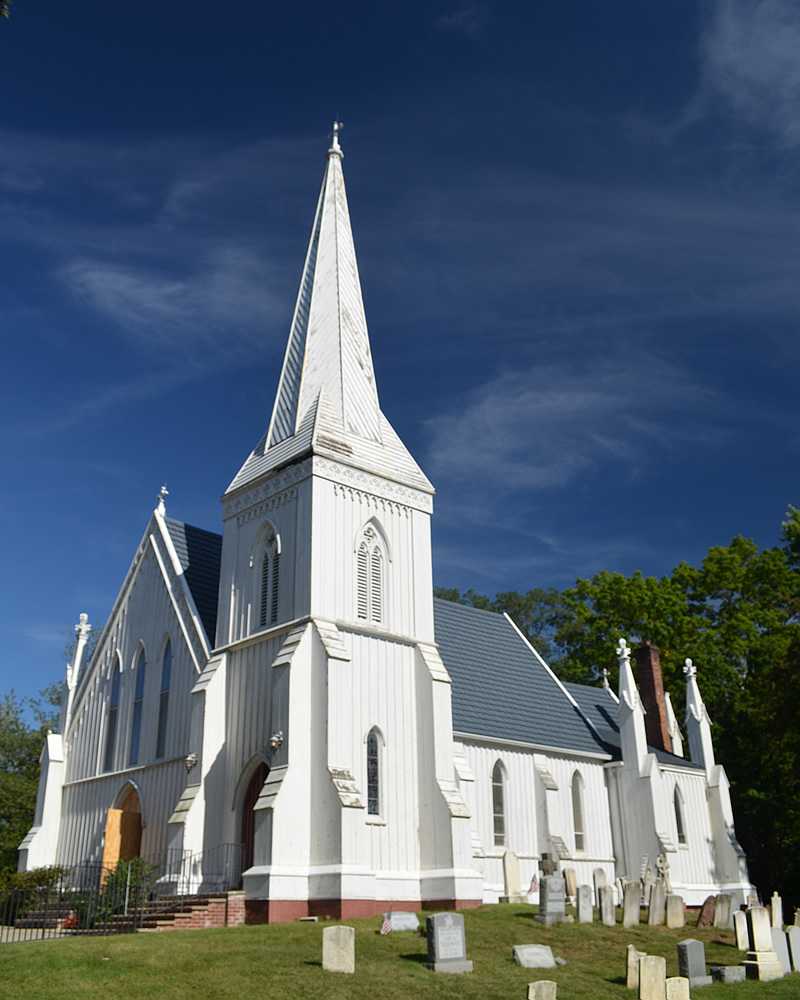

- Location within Middlesex County, New Jersey Location within New Jersey Location within the United States
- Location: Main Street and DeVoe Avenue, Spotswood, New Jersey
- Coordinates: 40°23′29″N 74°23′24″W
- Area: 3 acres (1.2 ha)
- Built: 1854
- Architect: Frank Wills; C. K. Pursell
- Architectural style: Gothic Revival
- NRHP reference No.: 79003251
- NJRHP No.: 1943

Significant dates
- Added to NRHP: October 10, 1979
- Designated NJRHP: July 21, 1979

St. Peter's Episcopal Church is a historic church located at the corner of Main Street and DeVoe Avenue in the borough of Spotswood in Middlesex County, New Jersey, United States. It was built in 1854 and features Gothic Revival architecture as designed by architect Frank Wills. The church complex, listed as St. Peter's Church and Buildings, was added to the National Register of Historic Places on October 10, 1979, for its significance in architecture and religion. The listing also includes the parish house, built in 1888 and designed by architect C. K. Pursell, and the rectory, built in 1872.

== See also ==
- National Register of Historic Places listings in Middlesex County, New Jersey
