= Duhernal Lake =

- Location within New Jersey Location within the United States
- Location: Middlesex County, New Jersey
- Coordinates: 40°24′04″N 74°22′23″W
- Type: Lake
- Managing agency: New Jersey Department of Environmental Protection
- Surface area: 38 ha (94 acres)
- Average depth: 1.4 m (4.6 ft)
- Max. depth: 3 m (9.8 ft)
- Residence time: 2 days
- Surface elevation: 2 m (6 ft 7 in)
- Islands: 6

Duhernal Lake is a lake in Middlesex County, New Jersey, United States. The lake is currently formed at the confluence of the South River, Matchaponix Bay and the outflow of Devoe Lake. It currently forms the border between the towns of Spotswood and Old Bridge.

The lake is eutrophic. It receives most of its water from the tributary Matchaponix Brook and Devoe Lake. Most of the water flows out to the South River.

The lake is a popular fishing site. Fish found in the lake include brown bullhead, bluegill sunfish and largemouth bass.

The lake is co-owned by the DuPont company, Ashland Inc., and the Borough of Sayreville. DuPont, together with the Hercules and National Lead corporations, created the lake in the 1930s by partially damming the South River.
