= Manalapan Brook =

Tributary of the South River in New Jersey

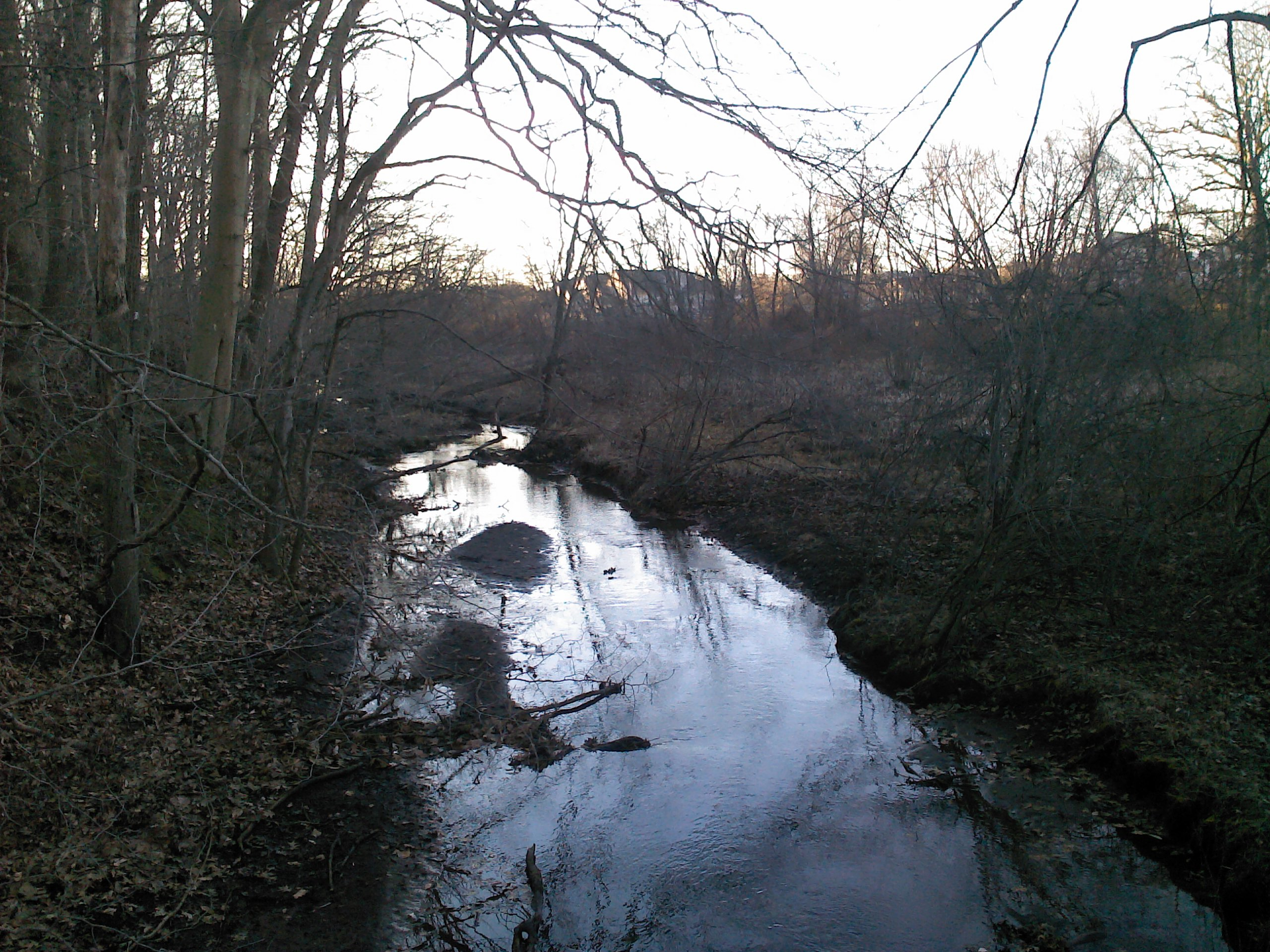
- Manalapan Brook facing west

Location
- Country: United States

Physical characteristics
- Source
  - coordinates: 40°11′29.2″N 74°23′35.3″W
- Basin size: 43 mi^{2} (110 km^{2})

Basin features
- Progression: Raritan River, Atlantic Ocean
- River system: Raritan River system

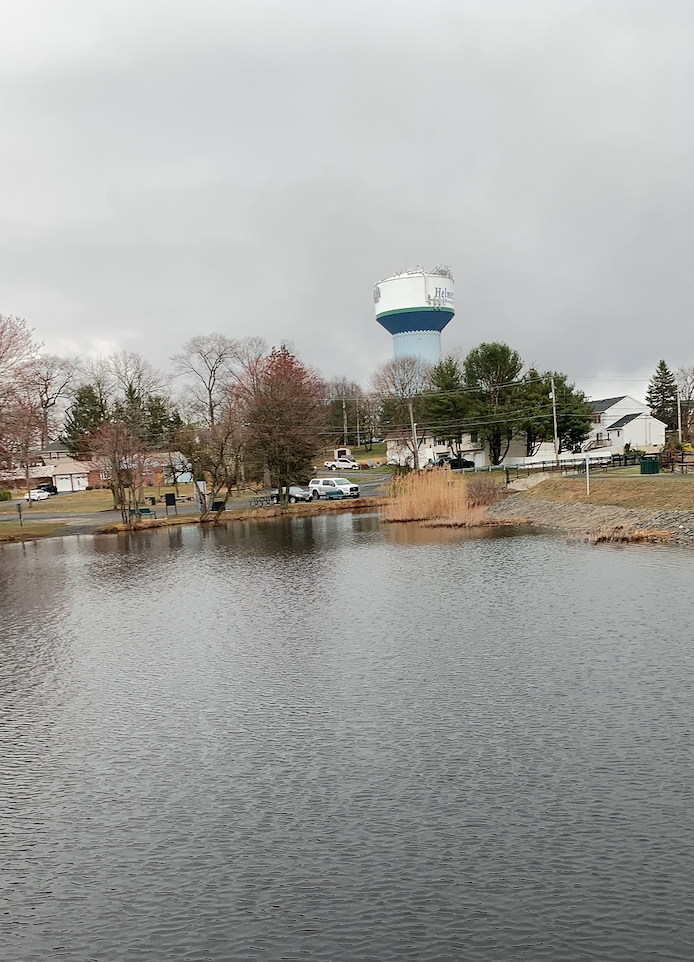
Helmetta Pond section of Manalapan Brook, with the Helmetta water tower in the background

Manalapan Brook is a tributary of the South River in Monmouth and Middlesex counties, New Jersey in the United States.

== Course ==
The Manalapan Brook's source is at 40°11′26″N 74°23′51″W in western Monmouth County, a few miles south of Monmouth Battlefield State Park, and roughly adjacent to the headwaters of the Manasquan River, Matchaponix Brook and Millstone River systems in the much larger Raritan Basin. This long brook flows generally north, traversing, along with its tributaries, much of Monmouth and Middlesex Counties.

Its drainage basin, the Manalapan Brook watershed, is a 43-square-mile (110 km^{2}) area, includes the municipalities of Millstone Township, Freehold Township, Manalapan Township, Englishtown, Monroe Township, Jamesburg, Helmetta, Spotswood, South Brunswick Township, and East Brunswick Township.

There are man-made lakes created by dams alongside the course of the brook, including: Bulk's Lake (near the Charleston Springs Golf Course in Millstone), Millhurst Pond (Manalapan), Lake Manalapan (Jamesburg), Helmetta Pond (Helmetta), and Devoe Lake (Spotswood).

After crossing the dammed section named Lake Manalapan in Jamesburg, Manalapan Brook continues north along CR 615 (Main Street) before flowing into Devoe Lake in Spotswood. The flow then merges with the Matchaponix Brook forming the South River at 40°23′33″N 74°22′58″W along the border of Spotswood and Old Bridge Township.

== History ==
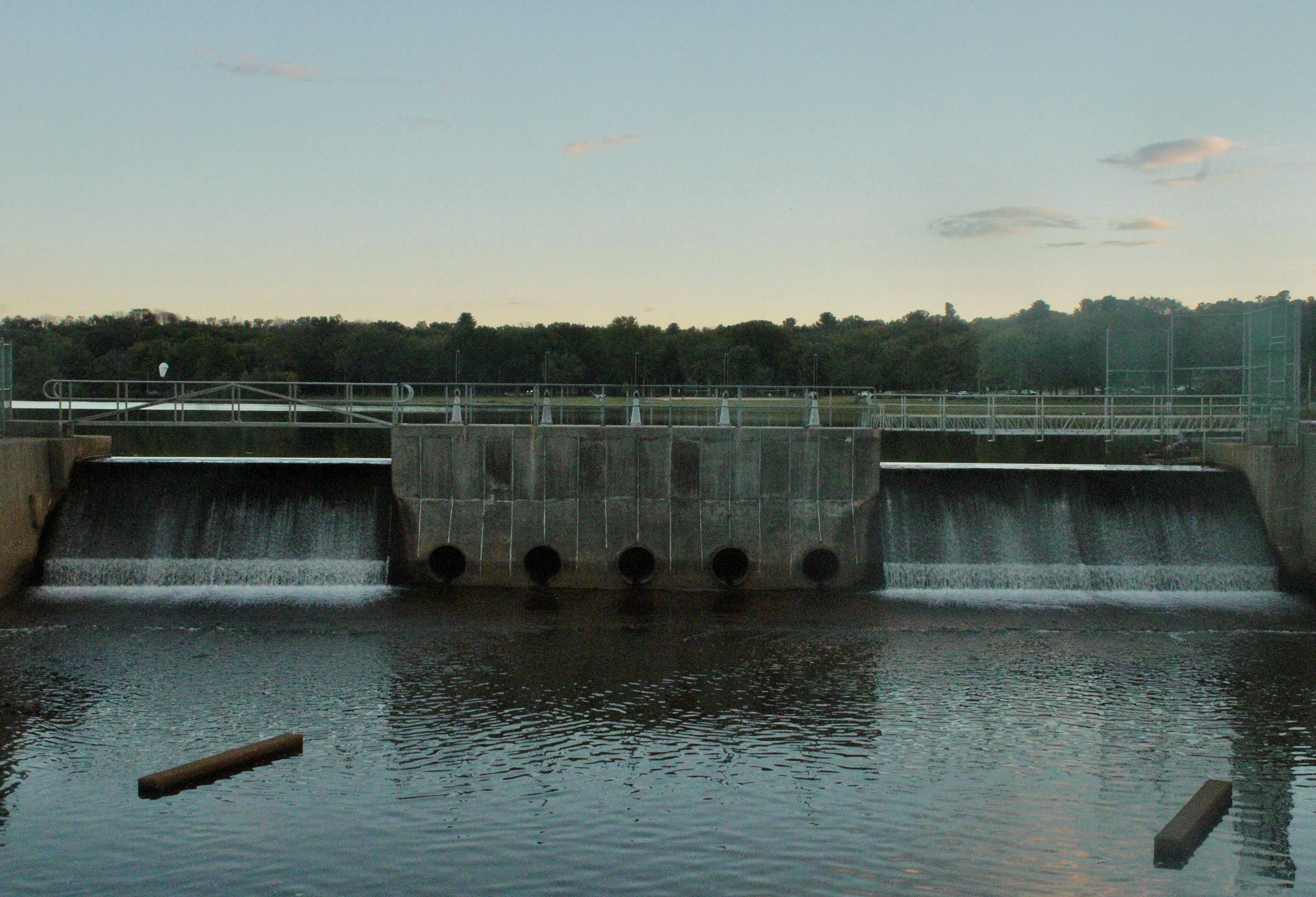
Waterfall stemming from Lake Manalapan in Jamesburg. It was dammed by the Buckelew family in 1911

- The name of the brook of Manalapan is Lenape for "Land of good bread" or "Land of good". The name also derives from Manalapan Township, one of the several municipalities the stream flows through. The Lenape fished at Lake Manalapan and the surrounding watershed.

Manalapan in the Unami Lenape dialect more correctly corresponds to Man- "tilt/slant" Alapan- "Sunny weather"- combined would describe sun rays through Manalapan's forests and fields, which were maintained by the Lenape by a combination of localized syntropic farming and hunter-gathering lifestyle.

- The rich soil deposits in the watershed made it ideal for cultivation in the 19th and 20th centuries. The viability of being able to cultivate agriculture in this watershed, allowed there for various mills to become established along this long brook. Most notable of mills located on the brook, included Millhurst Mill in Manalapan, Buckelew Mills (owned by the prestigious Buckelew family) in Jamesburg, and G. W. Helme Snuff Mill (established by George Washington Helme) in Helmetta.

== Gallery ==
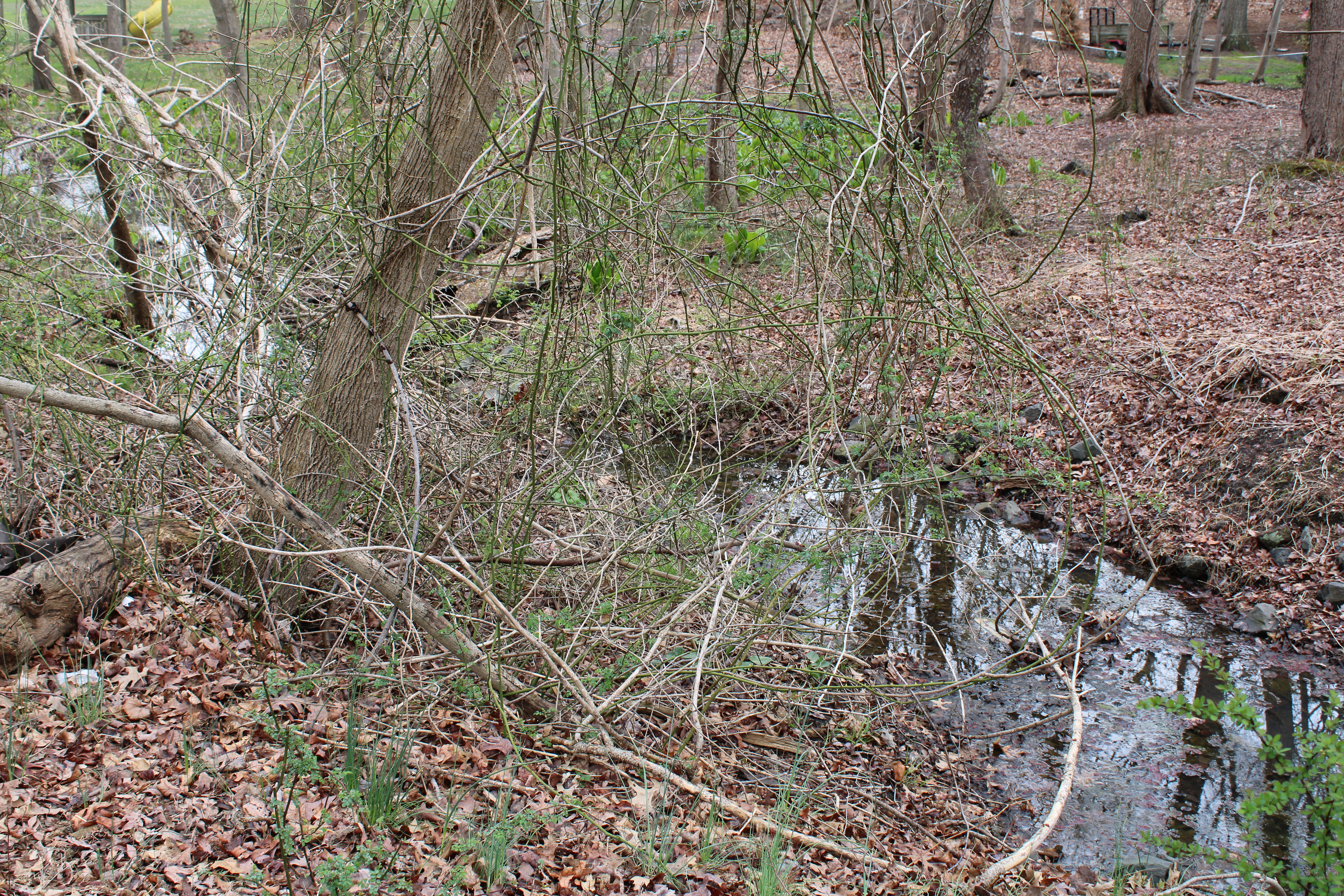
Manalapan Brook near its headwaters in Millstone Township

Manalapan Brook flowing behind Camp Topanemus in Millstone Township

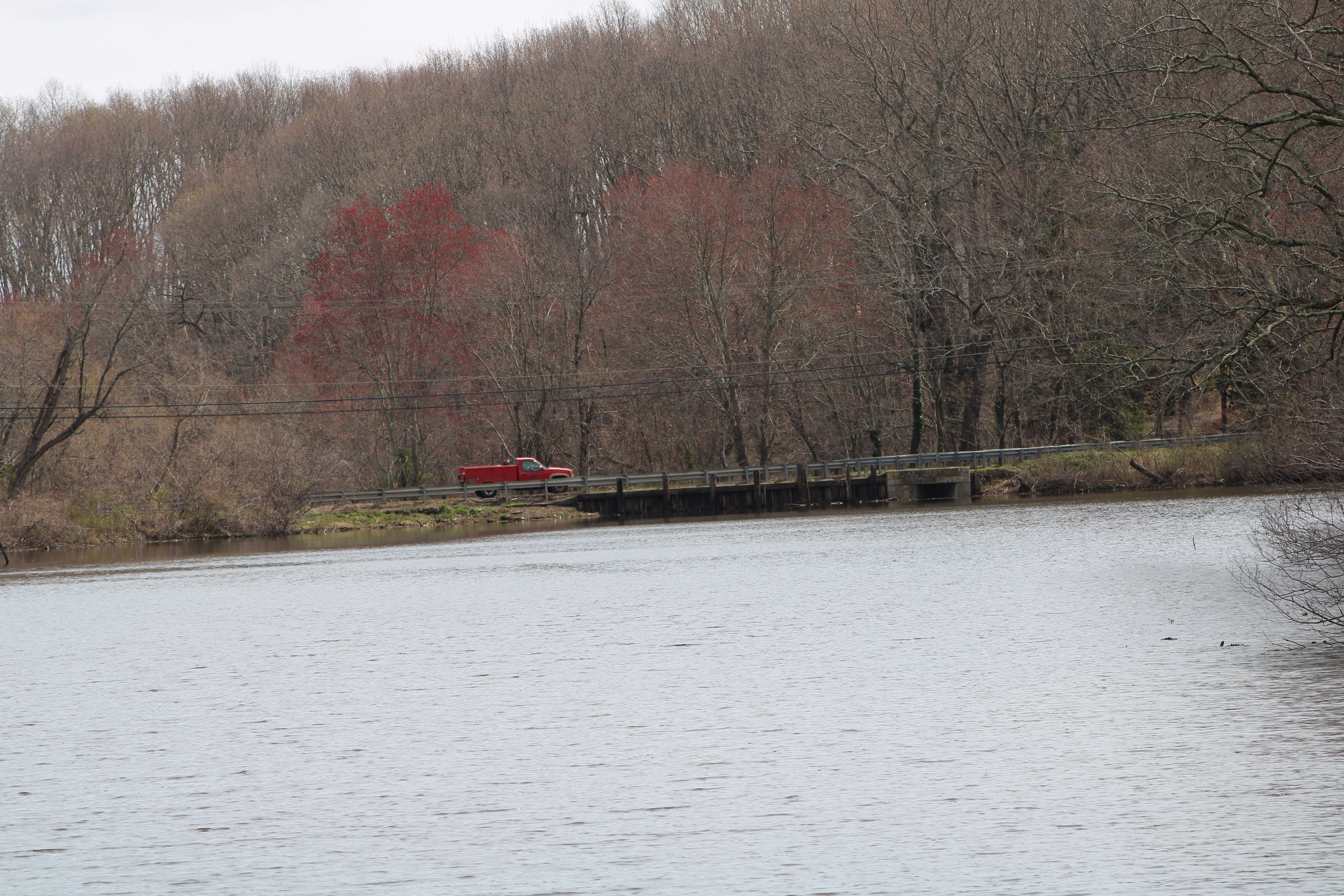
Bulk's Lake near Charleston Springs in Millstone Township

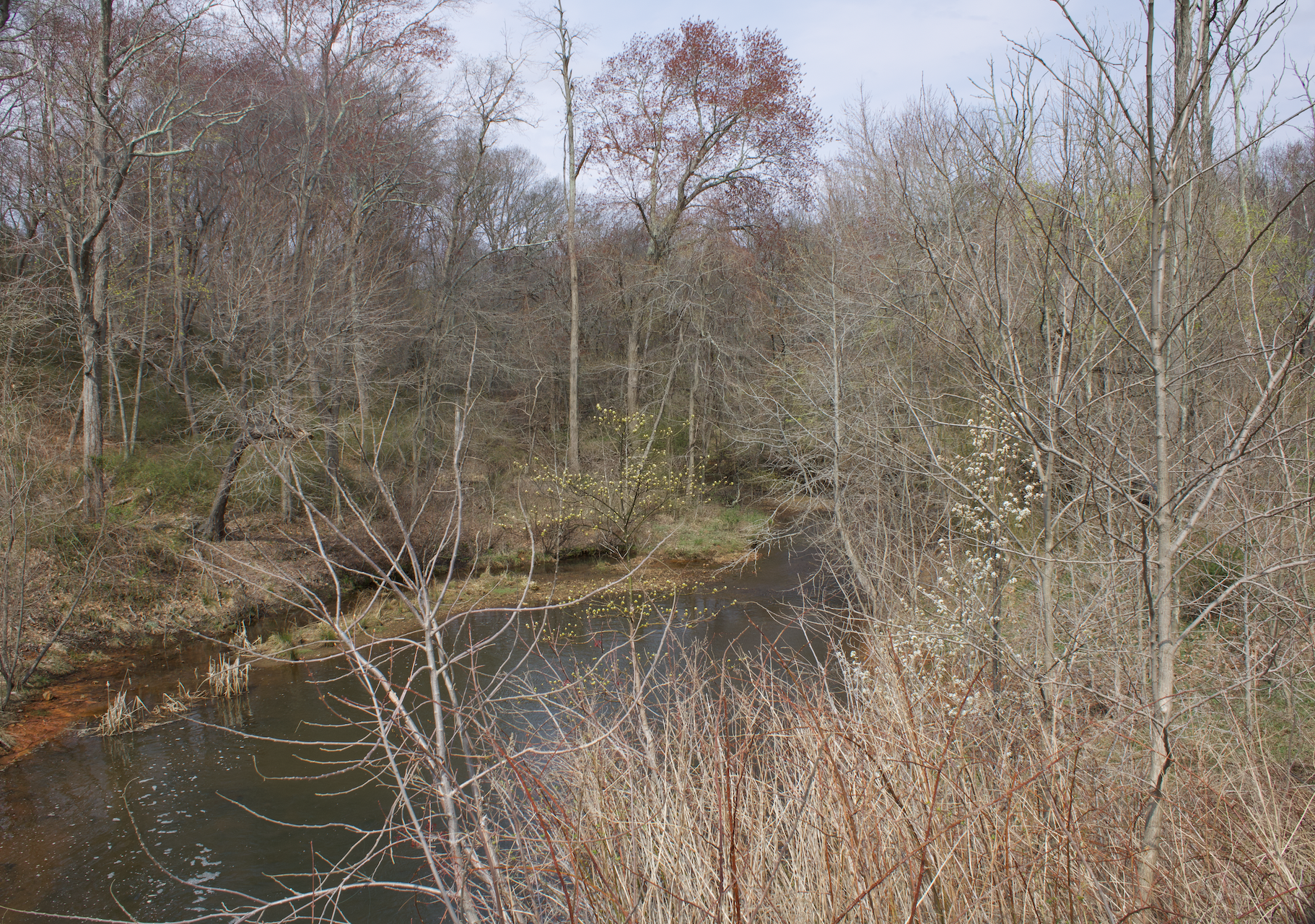
Manalapan Brook flowing behind the Millhurst Mill in Manalapan Township

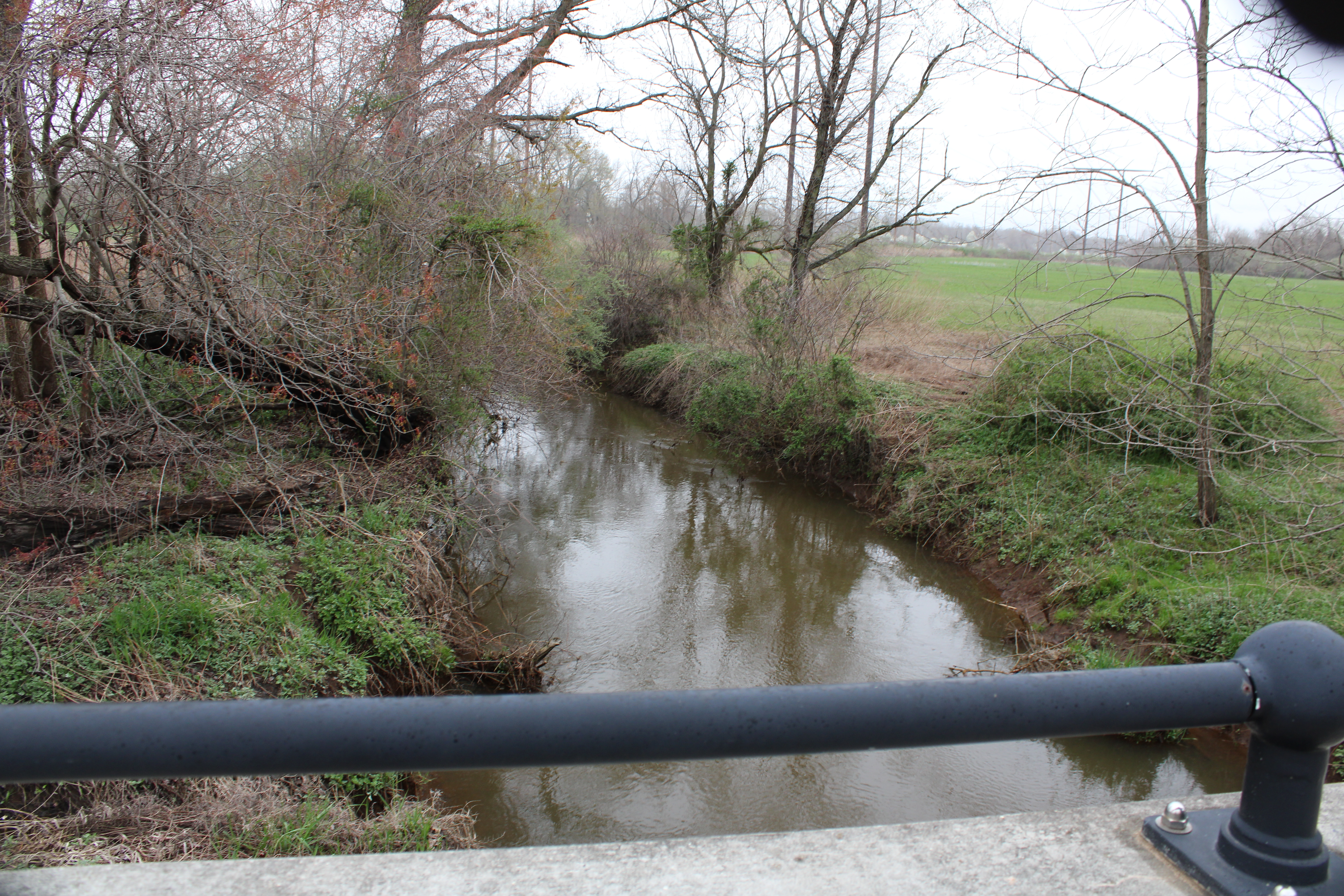
Manalapan Brook flowing under County Route 527A in Manalapan Township

Manalapan Brook flowing near Gasko's Family Farm in Monroe Township

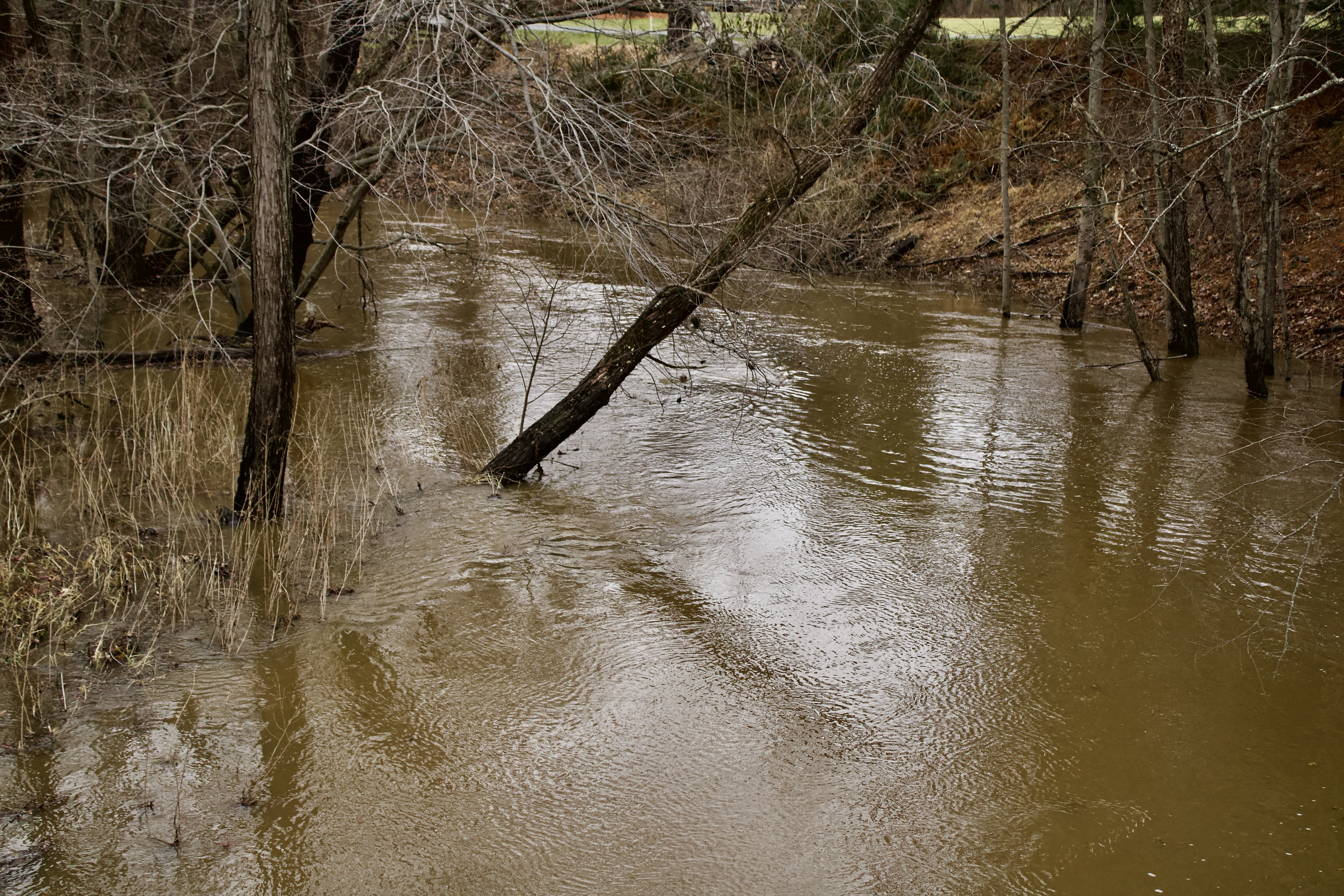
Manalapan Brook flowing towards Lake Manalapan in Monroe Township

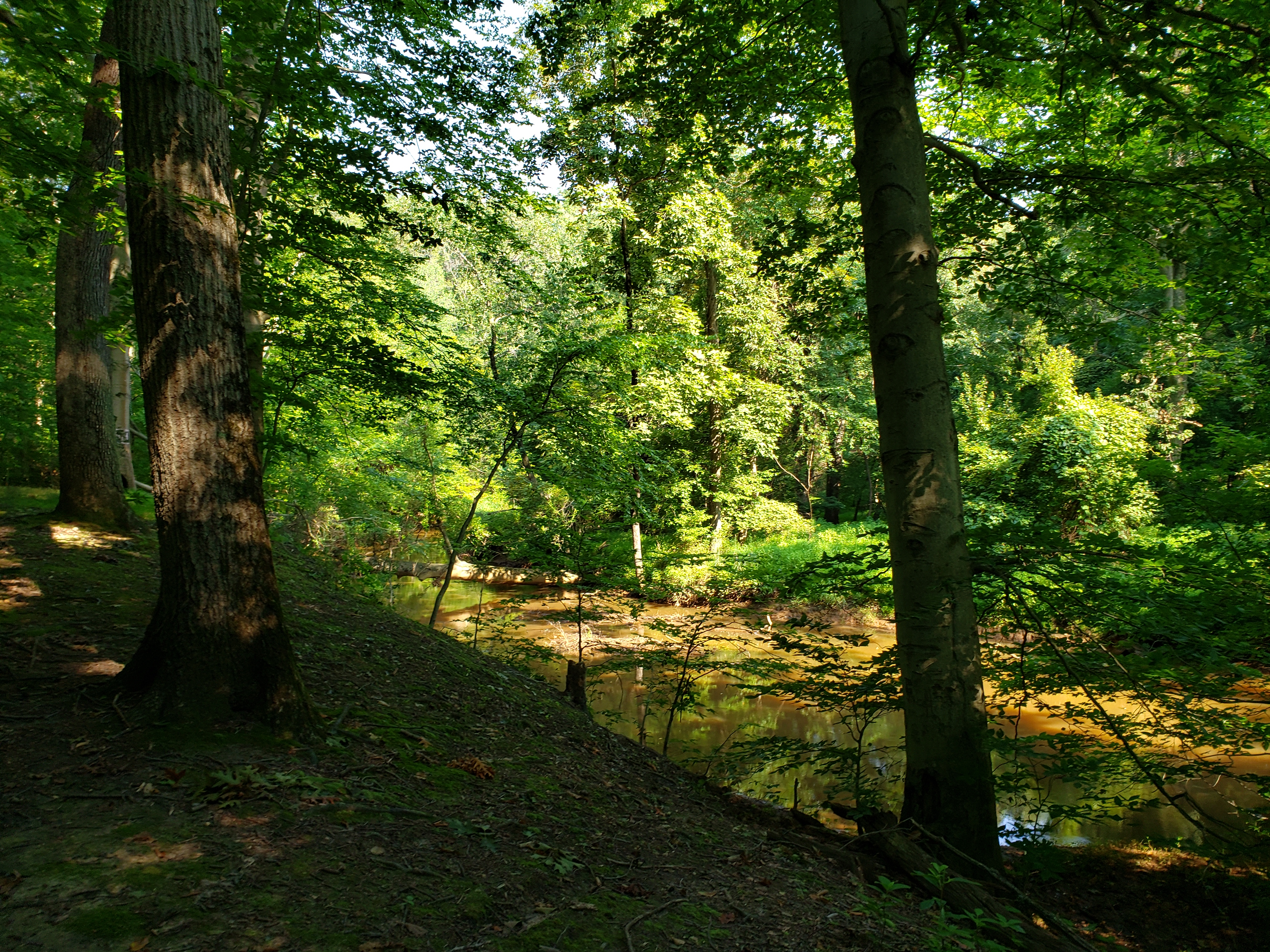
Manalapan Brook as it winds through the eastern part of Thompson Park in Monroe Township

Manalapan Brook in Helmetta

== Succession and pathway of Manalapan Brook ==
The Manalapan Brook, a 105-mile inland waterway (New Jersey), connects from the Raritan Bay to the lesser known end; splitting apart into two branches in Manalapan, this is a list of important landmarks in Central New Jersey where the Manalapan Brook is present (sometimes in larger water-body forms).

- Atlantic Ocean (Starts Here, near the Raritan Bay)
- Raritan Bay to the Mouth of Raritan River (Near Perth Amboy, NJ and passes under the Governor Alfred E. Driscoll Bridge)
- Raritan River (Continues for about 1–3 Miles; it splits into a tributary of the Raritan River, known as the South River)
- South River (The South River splits at Duhernal Lake on the border between Old Bridge Township and Spotswood, with the Matchaponix Brook traveling southward towards Englishtown, while the Manalapan Brook continues to travel southwestward towards Jamesburg)
- Devoe Lake (The brook flows underneath CR. 613 (Devoe Ave.) into Devoe Lake)
- Helmetta Pond (The brook continues southwest, roughly parallel to CR. 615 (Bordentown Ave.) through Helmetta, as Helmetta Pond is connected to the brook to the slight northeast, with the lake also being connected by Cedar Brook to its north, which drains through pinelands from Devoe Lake)
- Lake Manalapan (The brook flows underneath CR. 522 into Lake Manalapan in Jamesburg, passing by Thompson Park, on the other side of the lake the brook takes a sharp southeast turn as it flows underneath Freehold Industrial Track)
- Manalapan Brook (The brook flows for a few miles through hillier terrain and farmland, roughly parallel with CR. 522 in Monroe Township)
- Federal Road (The brook crosses under Federal Road near Gasko's Family Farm in Monroe Township)
- James Monroe Memorial Park (The brook flows through James Monroe Memorial Park in Monroe Township)
- Monmouth County (The brook flows into western Monmouth County into Manalapan Township)
- Manalapan Brook (The brook flows underneath CR. 527A near Happy Day Farm in Manalapan Township)
- Manalapan Brook (Continues through farmland in Manalapan Township (Off Of McCaffery Road) and splits into two branches):
- 1: The eastern (secondary) section flows southeastward underneath CR. 527, continues flowing underneath the "Freehold Bypass" section of Route 33 into a wide creek, continues through southern Manalapan Township Roughly Parallel to Kinney/Gully Road, before crossing into Freehold Township as a large creek (aptly named "Turtle Hollow" by locals, in lieu of the development of the same name surrounding this creek) and then flows directly south underneath Gully Road, the brook flows between two developments before ending as another creek (serving as the secondary brook's headwaters) near CentraState Medical Center)
- 2: The western (main) section flows southward underneath Route 33 and then shortly after that underneath CR. 527 into Millhurst Pond, the brook then turns sharply southwest through a mixture of marsh and forested areas into Smithburg (a small community in which the municipalities of Freehold Township, Manalapan Township and Millstone Township intersect) the brook then crosses underneath CR. 527 again into Bulk's Lake near Charleston Springs Golf Course, the brook continues southwest through Millstone Township crossing underneath CR. 524 and then flows through forested areas near YMCA's Camp Topanemus, before ending near a mixture of forested areas, wetlands, and housing developments (serving as the main brook's headwaters) on Stillhouse Road (not too far from the headwaters for the Toms River and the Millstone River)

== Parks along Manalapan Brook ==
- Charleston Springs County Park (Millstone)
- Thompson Grove Park (Manalapan)
- James Monroe Memorial Park (Monroe)
- Thompson County Park (Monroe and Jamesburg)
- Jamesburg Knights of Columbus Park (Jamesburg)
- Helmetta Lake Park (Helmetta)
- Mundy Ave Park (Spotswood)

== See also ==
- List of rivers of New Jersey
