= South River (Raritan River tributary) =

River in New Jersey, US

Coordinates: 40°26′49″N 74°21′52″W

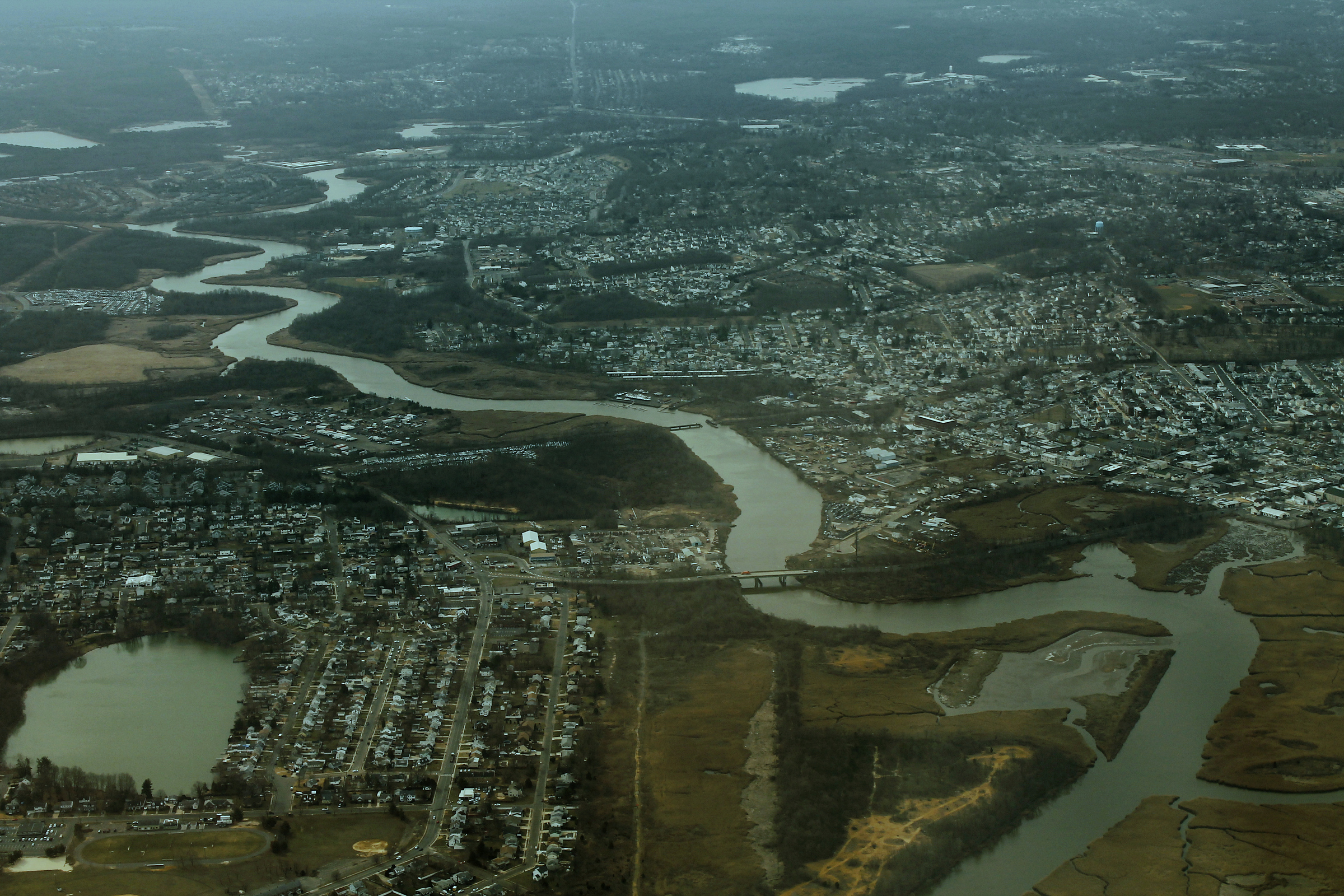
Aerial view of the South River

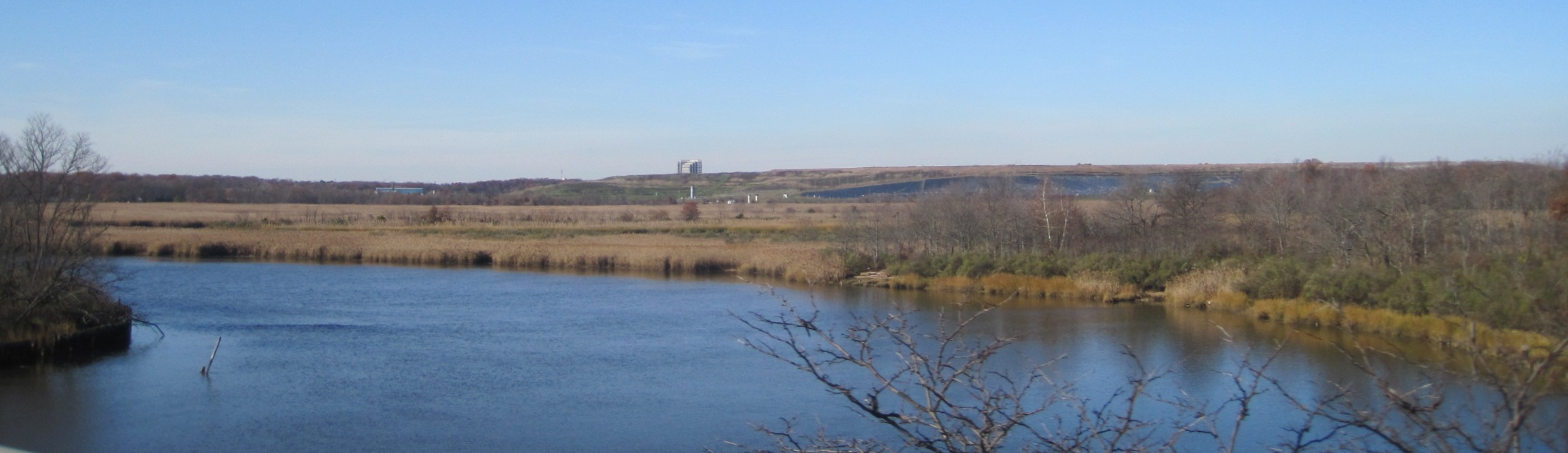
South River looking north (downstream) from the County Route 535 bridge in South River and Sayreville

The South River is a tributary of the Raritan River in central New Jersey in the United States.

The South River, formed by the confluence of Matchaponix Brook and Manalapan Brook, becomes tidal downstream of the Duhernal Lake dam and joins the Raritan River approximately midway between New Brunswick and Perth Amboy.

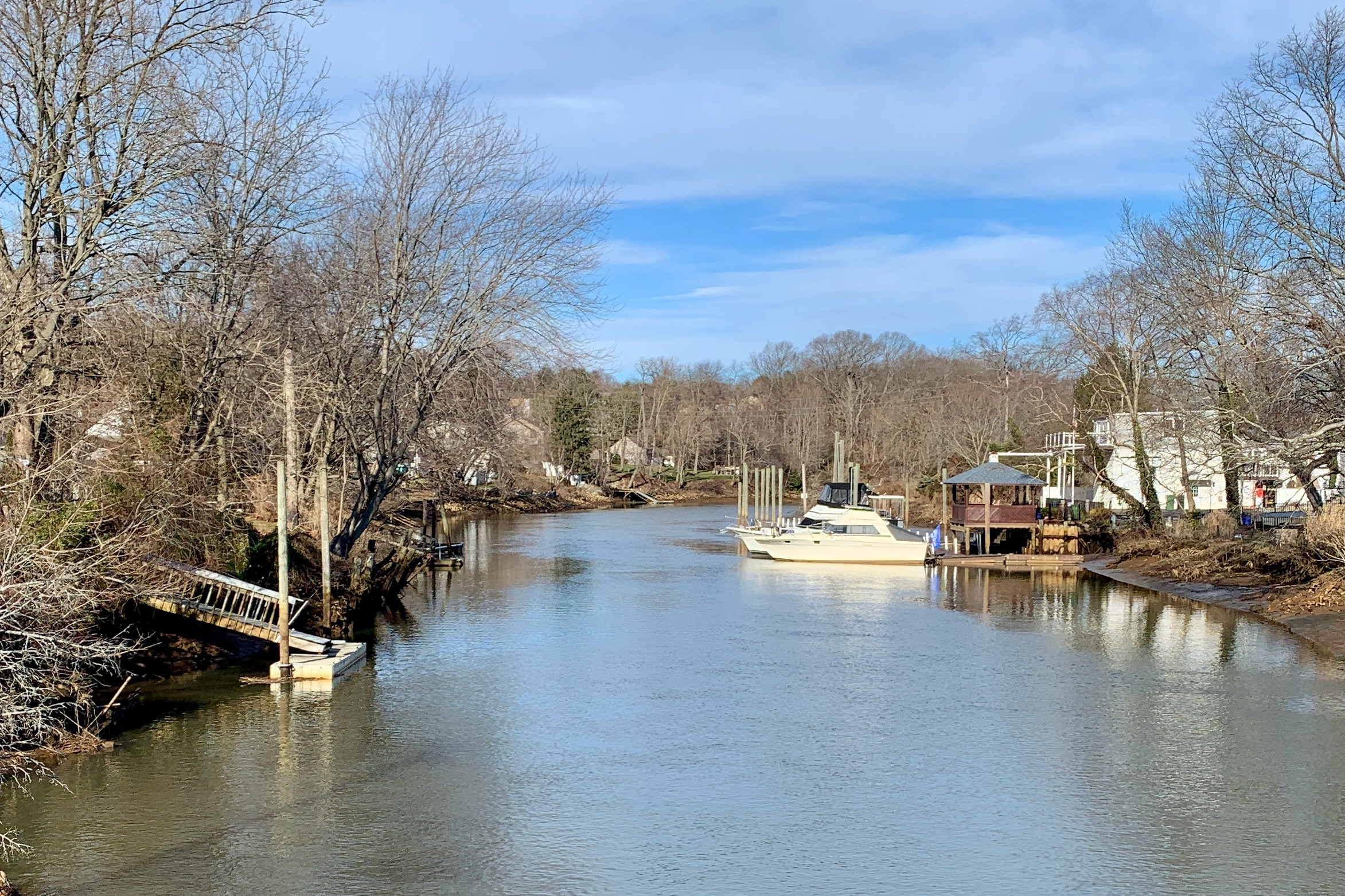
Looking north at the South River from the Old Bridge–Sayreville border.

The community of Old Bridge in East Brunswick was established in the 17th century at the head of navigation of the river.

The South River has two mouths. It used to loop inefficiently to its confluence with the Raritan River, so a shortcut called Washington Canal was created.

The river lends its name to the borough of South River.

== Tributaries ==
- Deep Run
- Duck Creek
- Manalapan Brook
- Matchaponix Brook
- Pond Creek
- Tennents Brook

== See also ==
- List of rivers of New Jersey
