= Washington Canal (New Jersey) =

Coordinates: 40.4662°N 74.3718°W

The Washington Canal, in Sayreville, New Jersey, is a waterway connecting the South River with the Raritan River, bypassing several loops at the mouth of the former.

It was chartered in 1823 to reduce the distance and hence travel time along the South River from South River, New Jersey (then known as Washington) to the Raritan River, and built about 1824–1825.

During Hurricane Sandy, the area around the Washington Canal suffered surges up to 14 feet above flood stage. Nearly all homes became uninhabitable, and more than 30 lost their foundations.
