= Matchaponix Brook =

River in New Jersey, US

Coordinates: 40.392607°N 74.382927°W

Matchaponix Brook is a tributary of the South River in Monmouth and Middlesex counties, New Jersey in the United States.

Matchaponix Brook (Lenape for "country of poor bread") is born in Englishtown at the convergence of Weamaconk Creek and McGellairds Brook, adjacent to the headwaters of Manalapan Brook. It meets Pine Brook at the county line. Upon entering Middlesex County, it forms the boundary between Old Bridge and Monroe Townships. Cutting west and then turning north again, it sweeps around the Old Bridge Airport and meets Barclay Brook just south of the hamlet of Texas. From thence it continues north to meet Manalapan Brook and form the South River and Duhernal Lake.

The brook has a drainage area of 41.7 square miles.

== Tributaries ==
- Barclay Brook
- Pine Brook
- Weamaconk Creek
- McGellairds Brook

== See also ==
- List of rivers of New Jersey
