= Half Acre, New Jersey =

Populated place in Middlesex County, New Jersey, US

- Unincorporated community
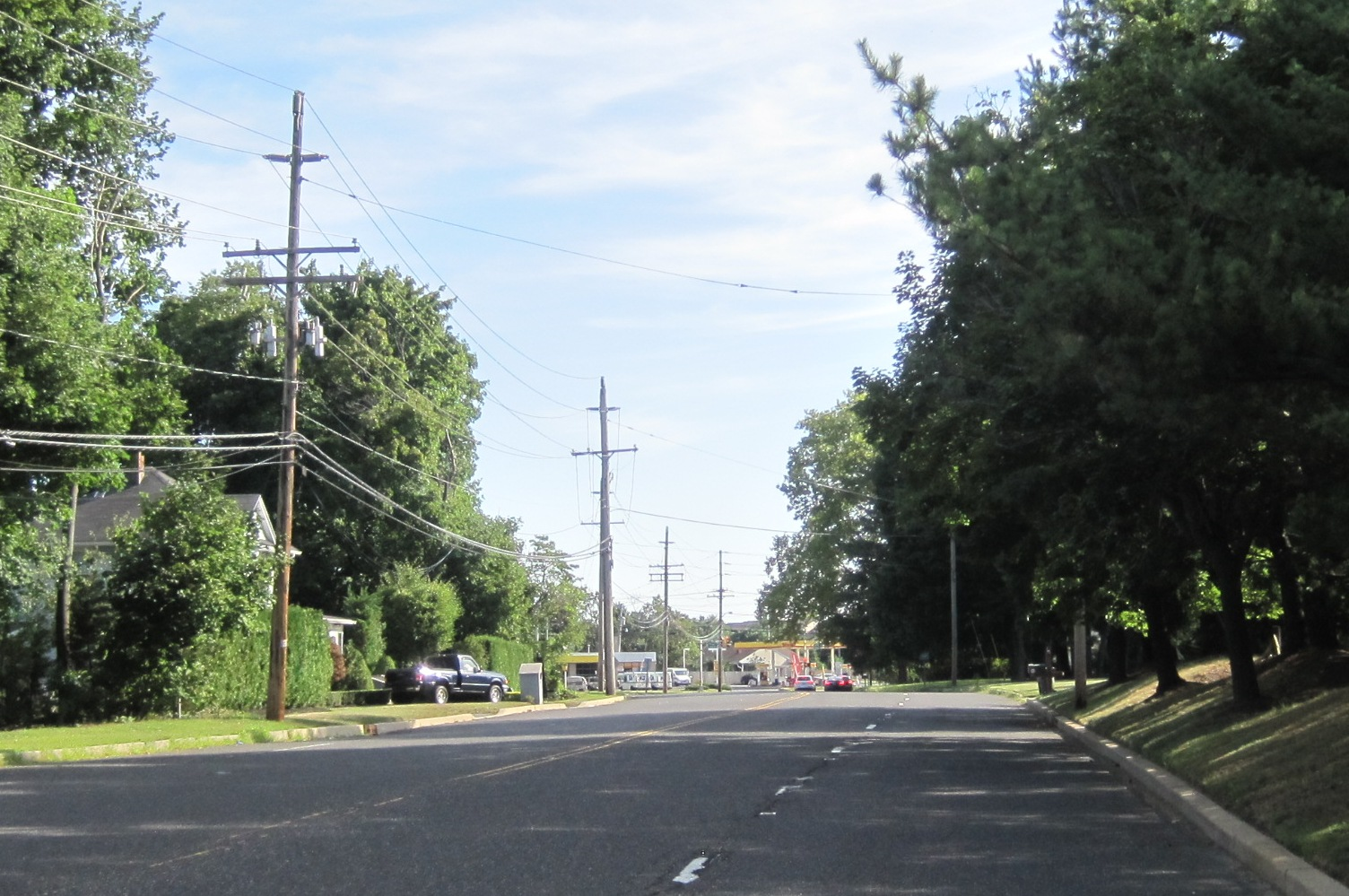
- Approaching the center of Half Acre from the south

- Location within Middlesex County, New Jersey Location within New Jersey Location within the United States
- Coordinates: 40°19′14″N 74°27′09″W
- Country: United States
- State: New Jersey
- County: Middlesex
- Township: Monroe
- Elevation: 148 ft (45 m)
- GNIS feature ID: 876888

Half Acre is an unincorporated community located within Monroe Township in Middlesex County, in the U.S. state of New Jersey. The settlement is located roughly at the intersection of Prospect Plains Road (County Route 614) and Half Acre Road (CR 615) in the center of the township. Some single-family homes and small businesses are located along those two roads and Cranbury-Half Acre Road but most of the area is made up of age-restricted housing developments including Concordia, Clearbrook Park, Greenbriar at Whittingham, and Encore at Monroe.
