= Retirement to Florida =

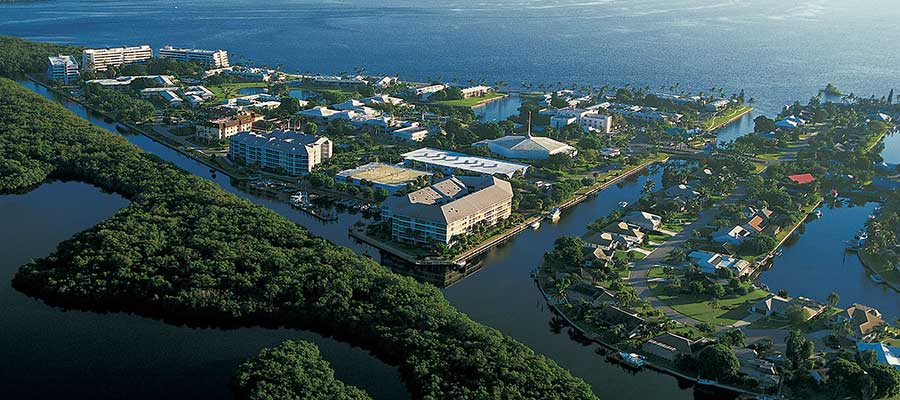
Shell Point Retirement Community, a not-for-profit continuing care retirement community (CCRC) located in Fort Myers, Florida. Residents are provided a variety of services, ranging from an 18-hole golf course to specialty medical care.

Retirement to Florida is a phenomenon in the United States beginning in the 1950s in which retirees have, during certain periods, disproportionately chosen to move to the state of Florida to live out their retirement. This choice is promoted by a number of factors, including the year-round warmer climate in parts of the state, as well as the absence of a state income tax, and various recreational opportunities, leading to the development of an abundance of retirement communities.

== History ==
Until the mid-20th century, Florida was the least-populous state in the southern United States. In 1900, its population was only 528,542. Economic prosperity in the 1920s stimulated tourism to Florida and related development of hotels and resort communities. Combined with its sudden elevation in profile was the Florida land boom of the 1920s, which brought a brief period of intense land development. In 1925, the Seaboard Air Line broke the FEC's southeast Florida monopoly and extended its freight and passenger service to West Palm Beach; two years later it extended passenger service to Miami. Devastating hurricanes in 1926 and 1928, followed by the Great Depression, brought that period to a halt. Florida's economy did not fully recover until the military buildup for World War II. In 1939, Florida was described as "still very largely an empty State." Subsequently, the growing availability of air conditioning, the climate, and a low cost of living made the state a haven. Migration from the Rust Belt and the Northeast sharply increased Florida's population after 1945.

== Post-1950 developments ==
In the 1950s and 1960s, migration into Florida was localized, with retirees from places like New York City moving to Miami Beach in large numbers. A 1958 newspaper article identified factors making Florida increasingly popular as a retirement destination in the postwar era, arguing that no single factor explained the trend, but that retirees were drawn by the state's warm climate, mild winters, abundant sunshine, comparatively inexpensive housing, and favorable tax structure. It was noted that many retirees from northern states could sell higher-priced homes and purchase less expensive residences in Florida while retaining cash reserves, with two-bedroom homes in Florida costing "between 20 and 40 per cent less than homes in most of the rest of the country". It also emphasized the absence of a state income tax, relatively low property taxes, and generous homestead exemptions. It also noted limitations, observing that the overall cost of living was difficult to compare with other states and that employment opportunities for retirees seeking supplemental income were relatively limited. The average annual growth for the state between 1960 and 1989 remained above 3%, about double the national average growth.

=== Development of retirement communities ===
Retirement communities, which are often built in warm climates, became common in Florida, as well as other warmer states such as Alabama, Arizona, California, Georgia, Hawaii, Louisiana, Mississippi, Nevada, and Texas. In 2011, The Villages, Florida became the largest of these communities, approaching a population of 80,000 residents by 2020. Some of the characteristics of these communities typically are: the community must be age-restricted or age-qualified, residents must be partially or fully retired, and the community offers shared services or amenities.

Florida also contains a number of niche retirement communities targeting retirees who "share a common interest, hobby or trait". By 2011, niche retirement communities or "niche senior communities' - known as "affinity retirement communities" by industry professionals - had become "one of the biggest trends in retirement living." These communities attract those over 55 who want to be in communities of like-minded individuals from the same ethnic background. In Florida, there are niche retirement communities for car buffs and RVers, such as Lake Weir Preserve in Marion County; for first-generation Indian immigrants (55-and-over) in Tavares, in the Greater Orlando area, Lake County, Florida. The Villages, in Sumter County, Florida, is Florida's most well-known and fastest-growing retirement community development. It has been described as the state's "biggest example of a culturally and ethnically homogeneous retirement community", with a 98.4% white population. The Villages, a gated community reporting low crime rates, offers "free golf for life" on their executive golf courses.

A number of retirement communities in Florida have been structured to have an affiliation with particular organizations. Colleges have created options for retired alumni who enjoy campus life, for example, at the University of Florida in Gainesville and Eckerd College in St. Petersburg's College Harbor Retirement Community, with its Academy of Senior Professionals. Nalcrest, Florida, the name of which is derived from the acronym for National Association of Letter Carriers Retirement, Education, Security and Training, was established in 1963 as a retirement community for postal letter carriers, designed and operated by a branch of the National Association of Letter Carriers (NALC), the union representing United States Postal Service city letter carriers. Maranatha Village, established in 1973, is a Baptist retirement community north of Sebring, Florida, affiliated with the General Association of Regular Baptist Churches.

As of 2011, Florida contains the highest percentage of people over 65 (17.3%) in the U.S. There were 186,102 military retirees living in the state in 2008. About two-thirds of the population was born in another state, the second-highest in the U.S.

=== 2020s developments ===
In 2021, Florida was the most popular state in the country for retirees to move to, with over 78,000 seniors moving from other states to Florida, which was "more than three times as many as Arizona, which ranked second on the list". By the mid-2020s, however, it was reported that this trend had begun to reverse, with rising housing costs and broader increases in the cost of living eroding the state's longstanding reputation as an affordable retirement destination. In 2026 it was reported that rapid population growth during the COVID-19 pandemic had driven home prices sharply upward, and that many traditionally retirement-oriented counties now had median home prices at or above the national median. The article also noted declining net migration among lower- and middle-income retirees, and data indicating that Florida was losing residents to states such as North Carolina, Texas, Georgia, Tennessee, and Alabama, which offered comparable tax advantages with lower housing costs.

== See also ==
- Age-restricted community
- Elderly care
- Nursing home
- Transgenerational design
- Veterans Health Administration
