= Culture of Florida =

The culture of Florida is often different in metropolitan areas than in more rural areas. Many parts of rural central and northern Florida are similar to the rest of American Southern culture, particularly around the Panhandle. In the larger cities such as Miami, Orlando, and Tampa, where there has been a large number of people moving from other parts of the United States (mostly New York, New Jersey and Illinois), and even other areas of the world, the culture is much more diverse, and has been heavily influenced by Caribbean, Latin American, Jewish, Indigenous and European culture. Thus, modern-day Florida, from the second half of the 20th century through today, has been heavily influenced by the cultures of people moving in from foreign countries and other parts of the United States, and is often a mix of cultures, values, and ideas.

The state's close proximity to the ocean influences many aspects of Florida culture and daily life. Many people in Florida are avid boaters, surfers, and divers. Florida is home to more charter boat companies than any state in the United States. Snorkeling is a popular weekend activity in southern Florida, with several sites having dive and snorkeling training. In northern Florida, there are many horse breeding and riding farms, and the area around Ocala is one of the centers of thoroughbred horse breeding in the world. Florida culture is also influenced by tourism, an important industry in the state. Florida is home to the largest number of cruise ships in the world, and many people work in the cruise industry.

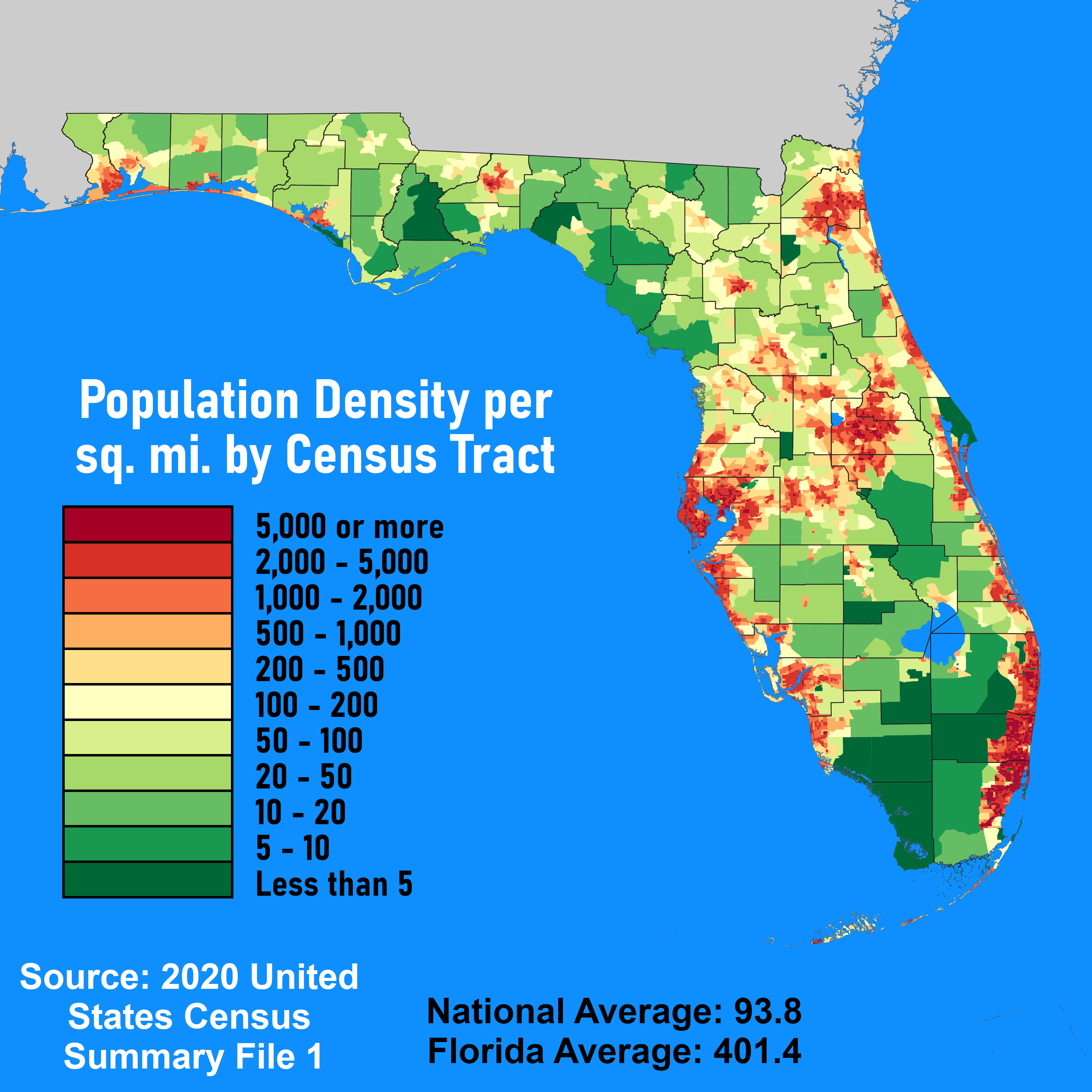
Population Density per square mile of each Florida Census Tract as of the 2020 United States Census

== Cuisine ==
Southern Florida has been more influenced by infusions from the various cuisines of the Caribbean, South America, and Europe, compared to Northern Florida. However, the cuisine of the Southern United States is popular throughout the whole state. Florida is most often associated with seafood, key lime pie and Floribbean cuisine. Citrus and strawberry production are major industries and the fruits are widely consumed, with strawberries seen as a winter and spring staple. Strawberry shortcake is especially popular with around 200,000 sold each year during the 11-day Florida Strawberry Festival. Less conventional strawberry desserts such as strawberry pizza are enjoyed by tourists. Tropical fruits are grown in South Florida and are widely used in Florida cuisine. Barbecue is especially popular throughout the state, where many barbecue competitions are held annually. The development of Florida cuisine has drawn on the cuisines of the southeastern United States, the Bahamas, Colombia, Spain, Cuba, and the rest of the Caribbean, as well as being influenced by national and worldwide trends. Florida attracts immigrants from places around the world as well, many of whom bring their native cuisine with them.

== Economic trends ==
Florida's population increases annually more rapidly than that of most states. The main economic driver for Florida is tourism. Hotels, restaurants, leisure activities and other tourism-related activities are economically important. Many people from other states retire in Florida. This helps drive home construction, infrastructure expansion, as well as the banking and financial planning industries. Recreational and commercial fishing have been economically important in Florida for over a century.

Florida is also an important agricultural state, producing large amounts of vegetables, fruits, cattle, and dairy products. Light manufacturing has recently increased in Florida, and a number of companies have moved their headquarters to the state, attracted by lower taxes and less regulations and less taxes.

== Languages ==
As of 2005, 74.54 percent of Florida residents age 5 and older spoke English at home as a first language, while 18.65 percent spoke Spanish, and 1.73 percent of the population spoke French Creole (predominantly Haitian Creole). French was spoken by 0.63 percent, followed by German at 0.45 percent, and Portuguese at 0.44 percent of all residents. Also, Italian comprised 0.32 percent, while Tagalog made up 0.30 percent of speakers, Vietnamese was at 0.25 percent and Arabic at 0.23 percent. In all, 25.45 percent of Florida's population age 5 and older spoke a language other than English.

Florida's public education system identifies over 200 first languages other than English spoken in the homes of students. In 1990, the League of United Latin American Citizens (LULAC) won a class action lawsuit against the state Florida Department of Education that required educators to be trained in teaching English for Speakers of Other Languages (ESOL).

== Literature ==
Florida literature is as varied as the state itself. Genres traditionally include fiction, nonfiction, and poetry, and some of it may be considered part of the American regional Southern literature genre. Writers affiliated with the locale of Florida include William Bartram, Elizabeth Bishop, James Branch Cabell, Hart Crane, Stephen Crane, Harry Crews, Nilo Cruz, John Fleming, Ernest Hemingway, Carl Hiaasen, Jay Hopler, Zora Neale Hurston, José Martí, Campbell McGrath, Marjorie Kinnan Rawlings, Wallace Stevens, and Harriet Beecher Stowe.

== Music ==
Florida is the birthplace of Southern Rock. Bands such as Lynyrd Skynyrd, Molly Hatchet, The Allman Brothers all hailed from Northern Florida. The Outlaws hailed from Tampa Bay.

Florida is home to several unique music subgenres including Freestyle Florida breaks and Miami bass.

Since the 90s, Miami has made a name in the world of electronic, rap, and reggaeton music. Miami Music Week, founded in 2010, is an annual electronic music event that gathers top EDM artists around the world. It is considered an institution in EDM. Some of the notable subgenres that participate at this event are Deep House, Techno, and Techno House. Other notable artists from Florida include Tom Petty, K.C. and the Sunshine Band, Less than Jake, Rabbit in the Moon, Company B, Expose, Stevie B and Will to Power.

== Religion ==
According to the Pew Research Center's Religious Landscape Study, Florida's population is 70% Christian (the largest sect of which is "Evangelical Protestant"), 6% non-Christian, and 24% "No Religion" or "Nothing in Particular." The latter categories, according to the same study, are rising over time, which is consistent with trends nationwide.

== Sports and recreation ==
Sports in Florida include professional teams from all major sport leagues, many minor league professional teams, Olympic Games contenders and medalists, collegiate teams in major and small-school conferences and associations, and active amateur teams and individual sports.

The state has teams in each of the major professional sports leagues, including – three National Football League (NFL) teams: the Miami Dolphins, Tampa Bay Buccaneers, and the Jacksonville Jaguars; two Major League Baseball (MLB) teams: the Miami Marlins and the Tampa Bay Rays; two National Basketball Association (NBA) teams: the Miami Heat and the Orlando Magic; and two National Hockey League (NHL) teams: the Florida Panthers and the Tampa Bay Lightning. Additionally, Major League Soccer has two teams, Orlando City SC, and Inter Miami FC.

Florida also has an abundance of outdoor recreational activities. Outdoor activities include hiking, surfing, and hunting. Notable auto-racing tracks include: Daytona International Speedway, Homestead-Miami Speedway, Sebring International Raceway, and Streets of St. Petersburg. The Miami Grand Prix is a Formula One Grand Prix which was held for the first time during the 2022 season, with the event taking place at the Miami International Autodrome on a ten-year contract.

== See also ==
- Demographics of Florida
