= Half Acre =

Half Acre may refer to:

- Half Acre, Alabama
- Half Acre, New Jersey
- Half Acre Beer Company
- "Half Acre", a song on the 2002 album Rabbit Songs by Hem
