= Maranatha (disambiguation) =

Maranatha is an Aramaic phrase in the New Testament of the Bible, translated as O Lord, come.

Maranatha may also refer to:

== Entertainment ==
- Maranatha (band), sludge metal band from the United States
- "Maranatha" (Millennium), an episode of the television series Millennium
- Maranatha! Music, a Christian music label

== Schools ==
- Maranatha Baptist University, in Watertown, Wisconsin, United States
- Maranatha Christian University, in Bandung, Indonesia
- Maranatha High School, in Pasadena, California, United States
- Maranatha Christian School, with several campuses in Victoria, Australia

== Other ==
- MaraNatha, a nut butter brand owned by Hain Celestial Group
- Maranatha Campus Ministries, a Charismatic/Pentecostal-oriented Christian ministry
- Maranatha FC, a Togolese association football club
- Maranatha Village, a Baptist retirement community near Sebring, Florida, United States
- Maranatha Volunteers International, a Christian non-profit organization based in Sacramento, California, United States
