= Private community =

Type of residential community

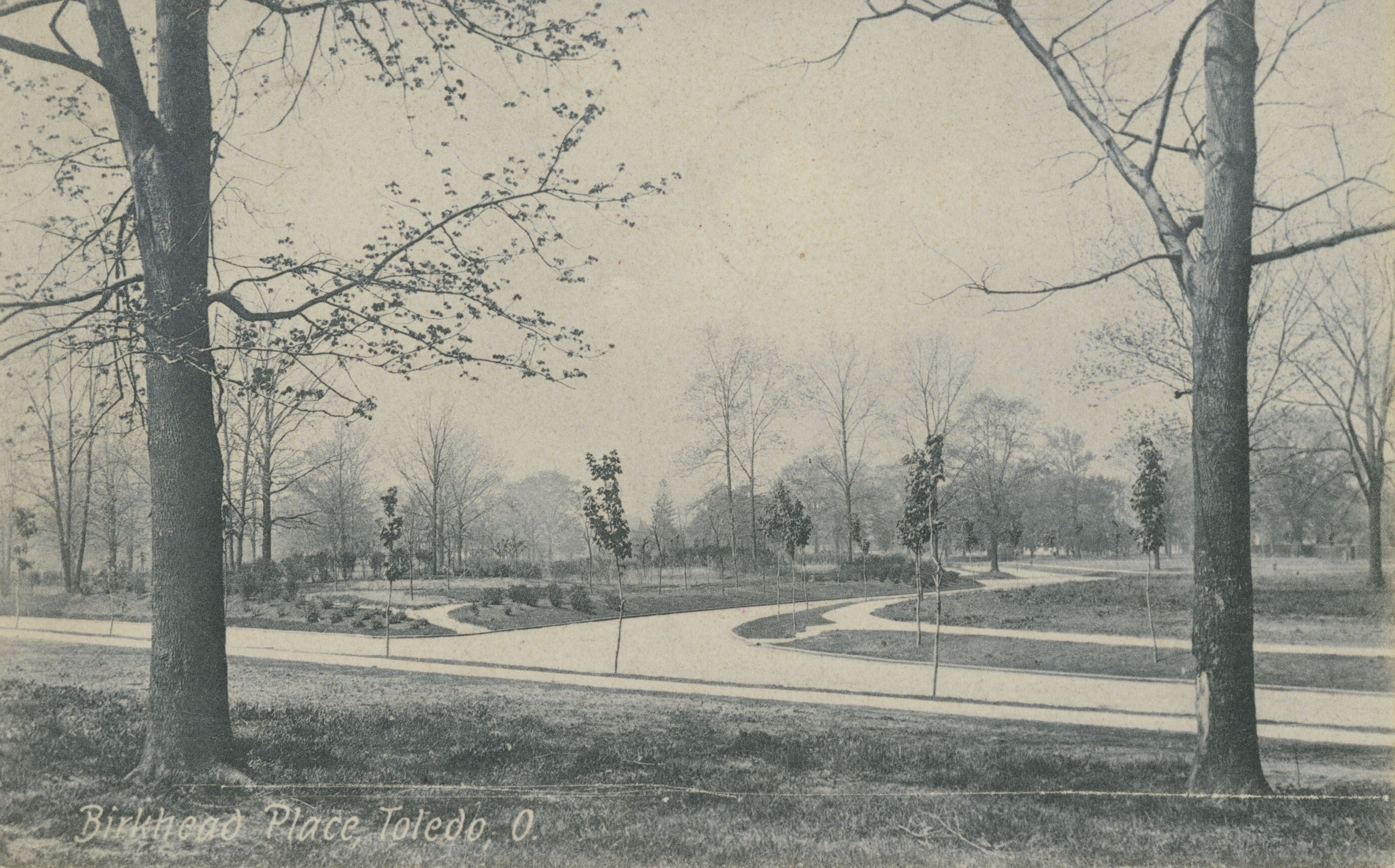
Birkhead Place in Toledo, Ohio, a private community of homeowners, the grounds of which can be seen here in 1907

A private community is a residential community that can be an association or a proprietary organization. Associations can include condominiums, homeowner associations or cooperatives.

Whereas governmental communities are financed with taxation, and taxes typically have little connection with benefits, private communities' benefits are financed by payments from its members. In a hotel, for example, the public goods such as elevators and security are paid for from room charges.

One early American example was Lucas Place, created in 1851 in St. Louis, Missouri, the first of about 50 such private places unique to the city. Today, there are 60 million people who now live in roughly 300,000 private communities in the United States.

A noteworthy Canadian example, Arbutus Ridge Seaside Community for Active Adults in the Cowichan Valley, on Vancouver Island, was the first comprehensive retirement community built in Canada. It subsequently became the template and proving ground for the age-restricted community, which is now accepted and common.

== See also ==
- Voluntary community
- Proprietary community
- Gated community
- Planned community
- Community settlement (Israel)
- Spencer Heath, whose goal was to have cities and large land areas owned by single private owners, who would rent out the land and housing and provide all conceivable public services
- Spencer H. MacCallum
