= Veterans Memorial Plaza =

Memorial plaza in Georgetown, Texas, U.S.

Coordinates: 30.716°N 97.719°W

Georgetown-Williamson County Veterans Memorial Plaza
- Sun City Texas
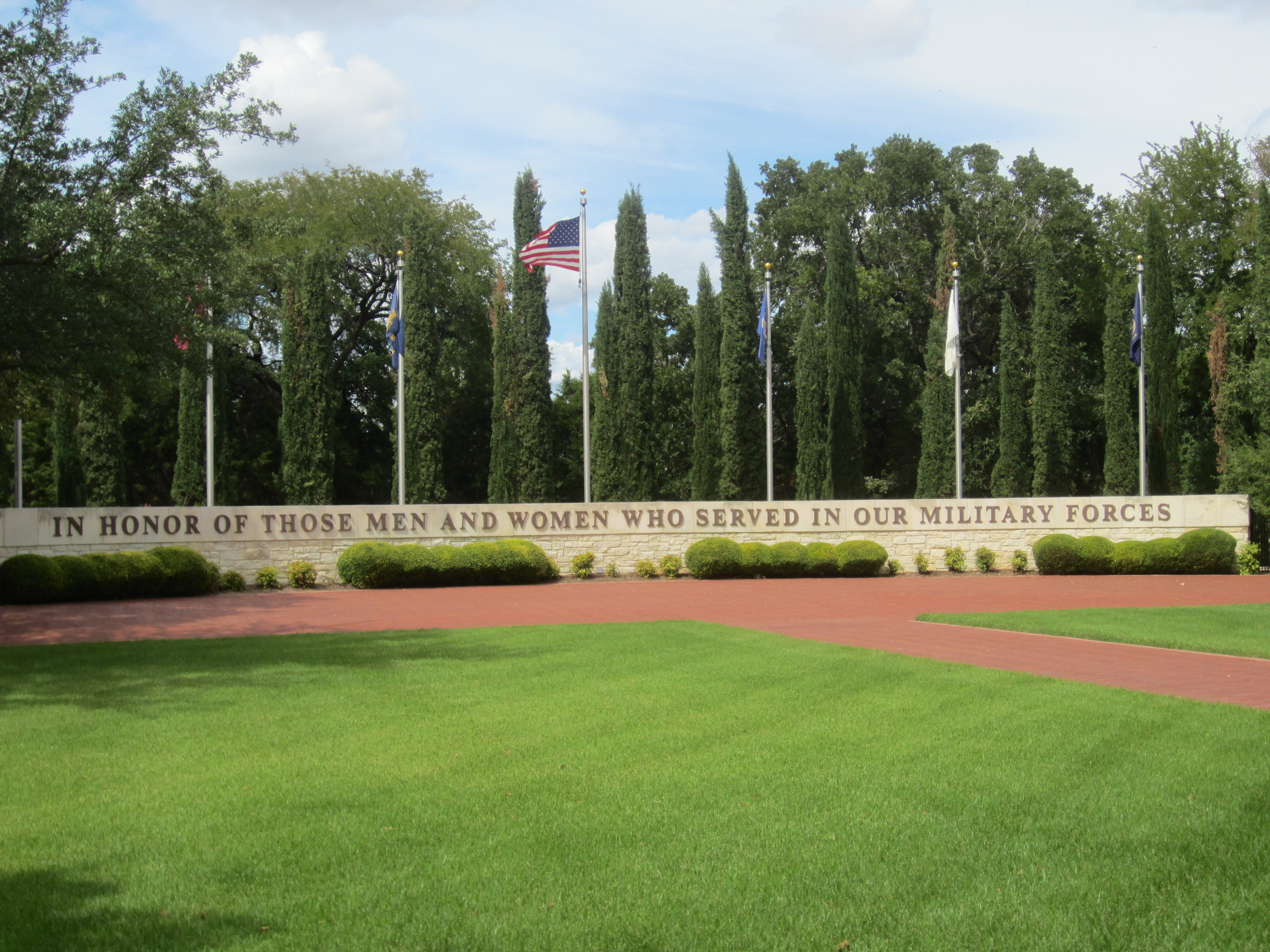
- The plaza in 2018
- For United States veterans and active service members
- Established: May 26, 2003
- Location: Georgetown, Texas
- In honor of those men and women who served in our military forces

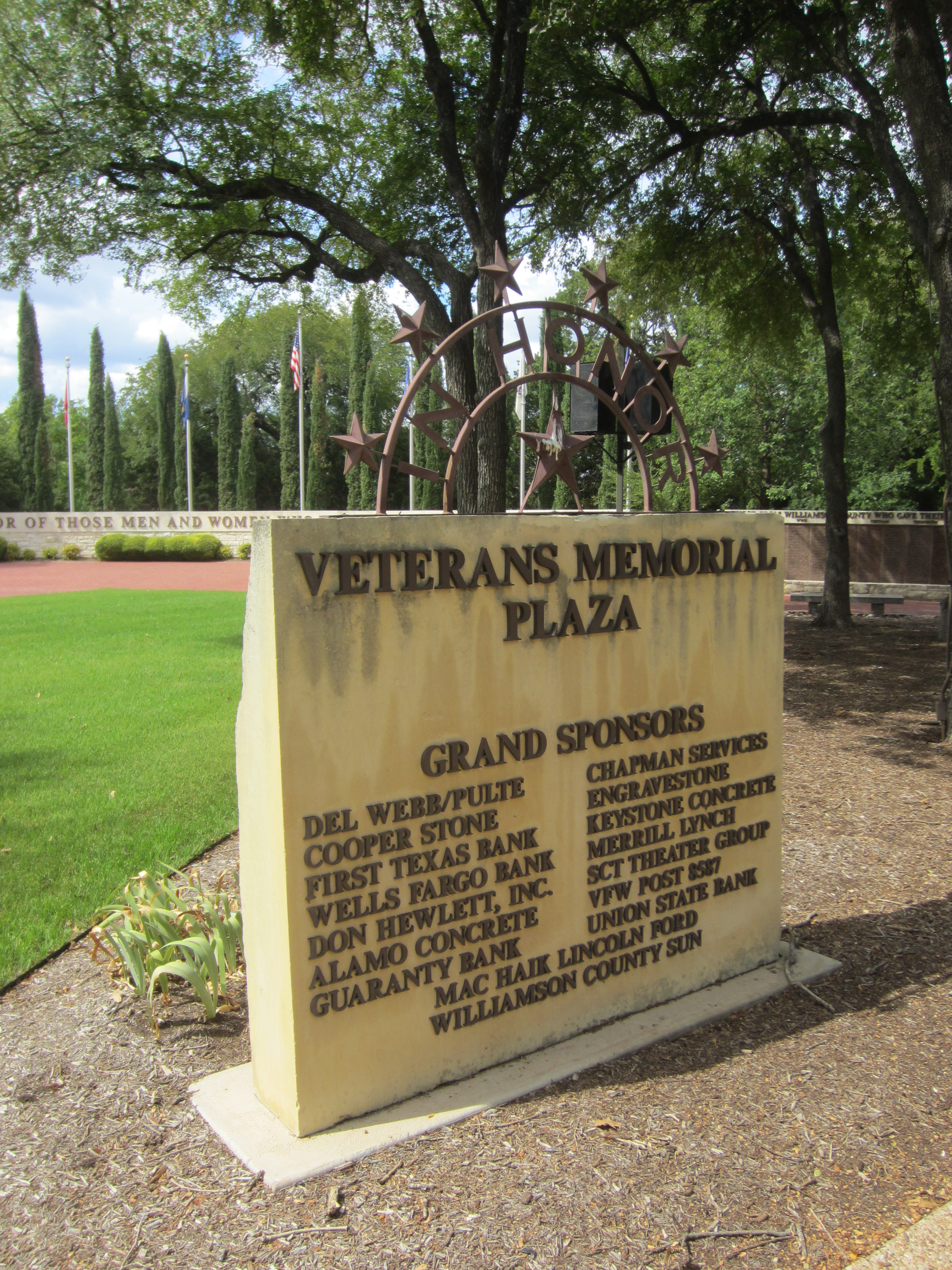
Signage in 2018

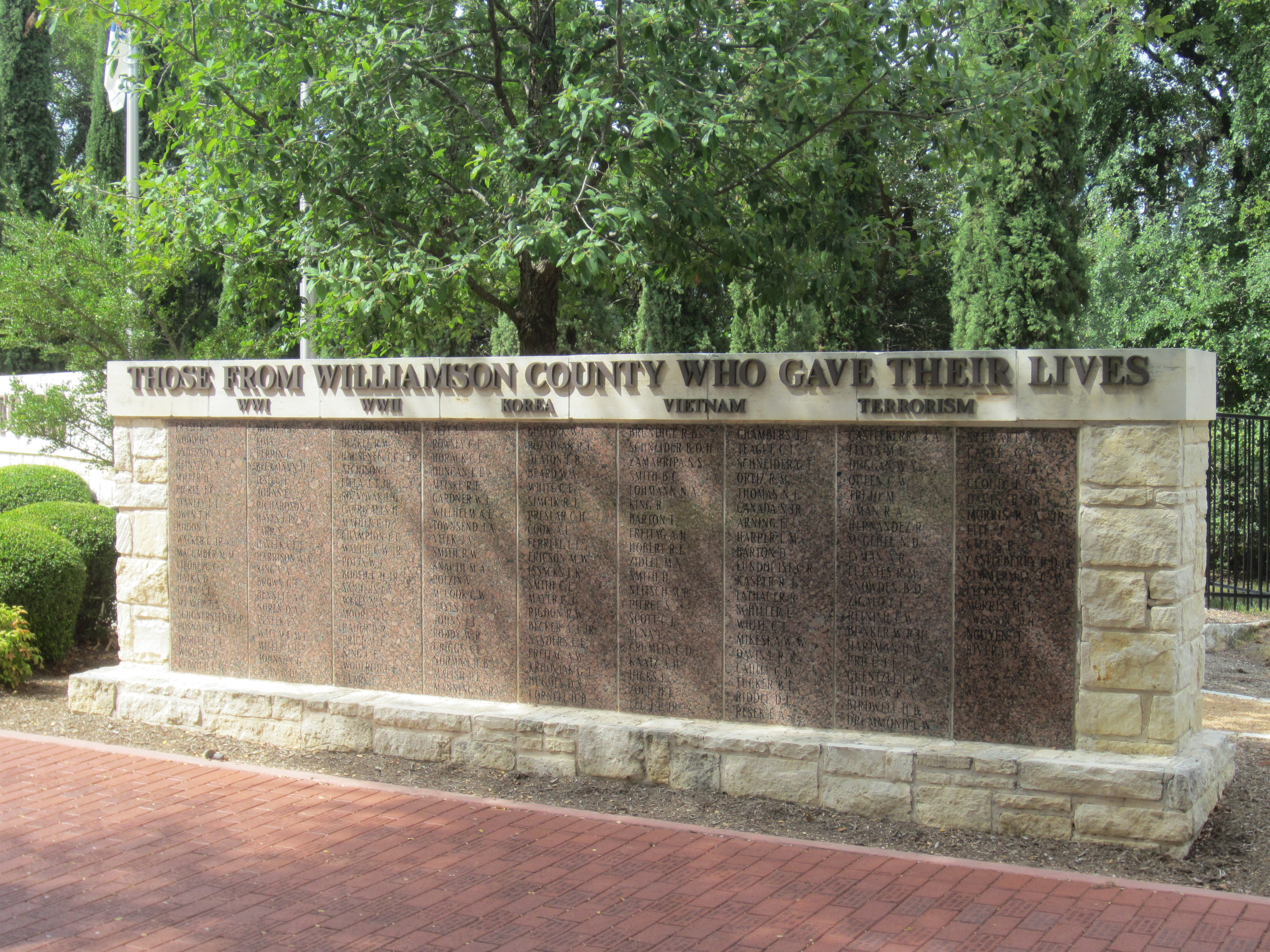
Memorial wall, 2018

The Georgetown-Williamson County Veterans Memorial Plaza, or simply Veterans Memorial Plaza, is a memorial situated in Sun City Texas, in Georgetown, Texas, United States. The site hosts Memorial Day and Veterans Day ceremonies, which have been attended by politicians and military personnel such as John Carter (2011), Sean MacFarland (2014), and Charles Schwertner (2014). Completed in the early 2000s, the plaza features more than 4,000 bricks inscribed with the names of veterans, as of 2015.
