= The Ponds, New Jersey =

Populated place in Middlesex County, New Jersey, US

- Census-designated place
- Location in Middlesex County Location in New Jersey Location in the United States
- Coordinates: 40°20′55″N 74°27′49″W
- Country: United States
- State: New Jersey
- County: Middlesex
- Township: Monroe

Area
  - Total: 0.23 sq mi (0.59 km^{2})
  - Land: 0.22 sq mi (0.56 km^{2})
  - Water: 0.012 sq mi (0.03 km^{2})
- Elevation: 135 ft (41 m)

Population (2020)
  - Total: 941
  - Density: 4,318.9/sq mi (1,667.55/km^{2})
- Time zone: UTC−05:00 (Eastern (EST))
  - Summer (DST): UTC−04:00 (EDT)
- ZIP Code: 08831 (Monroe Township)
- Area codes: 732/848
- FIPS code: 34-72726
- GNIS feature ID: 2806200

The Ponds is a planned community and census-designated place (CDP) in Monroe Township, Middlesex County, New Jersey, United States. As of the 2020 census, the year it was first listed as a CDP, the population was 941.

== Geography ==
The community is in southern Middlesex County and the southern part of Monroe Township, bordered to the west by Clearbrook, to the north and east by Concordia, and to the south by Union Valley Road. It is 4 miles (6 km) south of Jamesburg and 5 miles (8 km) northeast of Hightstown.

According to the U.S. Census Bureau, the CDP has an area of 0.23 square miles (0.60 km^{2}), of which 0.01 square miles (0.03 km^{2}), or 4.80%, are water. The community is within the drainage area of Cranbury Brook, which flows west to the Millstone River and is part of the Raritan River watershed.

== Demographics ==
Historical population
Census	Pop.	Note	%±
2020	941		—
U.S. Decennial Census

The Ponds first appeared as a census designated place in the 2020 U.S. census.

The Ponds CDP, New Jersey – Racial and ethnic composition Note: the US Census treats Hispanic/Latino as an ethnic category. This table excludes Latinos from the racial categories and assigns them to a separate category. Hispanics/Latinos may be of any race.
Race / Ethnicity (NH = Non-Hispanic)	Pop 2020	2020
White alone (NH)	806	85.65%
Black or African American alone (NH)	37	3.93%
Native American or Alaska Native alone (NH)	0	0.00%
Asian alone (NH)	52	5.53%
Native Hawaiian or Pacific Islander alone (NH)	0	0.00%
Other race alone (NH)	0	0.00%
Mixed race or Multiracial (NH)	5	0.53%
Hispanic or Latino (any race)	41	4.36%
Total	941	100.00%
