= Retirement Villages =

British property developer

Retirement Villages Group Ltd is a British residential property developer. Residents must be aged 55 or over to live in its developments, which are known as "villages". It was acquired by Axa for about £100 million in October 2017.

== History ==
The company was founded in 1981 and the first development to be built was Elmbridge Village in Surrey. Princess Alexandra officially opened Roseland Parc, a new retirement village in Cornwall, in 2008.

== Developments ==
The company's head office is in Victoria, London and its developments are located in Cornwall, Devon, Essex, Hertfordshire, Lincolnshire, Oxfordshire, Somerset, Surrey, Wiltshire, West Sussex, Kent and Warwickshire.

It owns 18 villages across Britain with 1,609 residents. Eight contain on-site care homes with a total of about 300 residents. In 2014/5 the firm had sales of £35 million and paid its six directors a total of £498,000.

In November 2016 it announced its intention to open seven more villages with a gross value of £200 million by 2021. The proposed locations would include Lower Shiplake in Oxfordshire, Saffron Walden in Essex, South Chailey in East Sussex, Merstham in Surrey and West Malling in Kent.

== Operations ==
- Independent living

This is a scheme where residents live in private housing without direct care provision. However, services can be purchased and 24-hour emergency cover is in place.

- Assisted living

Residents live in separate properties within the grounds of an existing care home and services including care can be provided as required.

- Residential care

Some developments provide residential care for people who cannot continue living in their own home, even with home care services.

- Respite care

Some developments provide respite care, which gives temporary relief for primary carers.
