= Leisure World, Arizona =

City in Maricopa County, Arizona

Leisure World
- Gated community, County island
- Leisure World Community Association
- Location in the United States
- Coordinates: 33°24′2″N 111°41′33″W
- County island: Leisure World
- County: Maricopa
- State: Arizona
- Founded: 1972

Government
  - Type: Homeowners' association

Area
  - Total: 0.93 sq mi (2.4 km^{2})
- Elevation: 1,240.00 ft (377.952 m)

Population
  - Total: 4,000+
  - Density: 4,317/sq mi (1,666.7/km^{2})
- Time zone: UTC−7 (MST (no DST))
- ZIP codes: 85206
- Area code: 480
- FIPS code: 04-46000
- Website: lwca.com

Leisure World is a gated, 55+ adult age restricted community located on a county island, in Maricopa County, Arizona, United States. The community is sovereign to, and surrounded by, the city of Mesa. Established in 1973, the community consists of nearly 500 condominiums and over 2100 single family residences (2,664 homes total).

== Governmental functions of HOA ==
The community is governed by a homeowners' association or HOA, and is subdivided into seven distinct voter districts, each with an elected district representative serving as a member at large on the board of directors. The elected board of directors is responsible for setting association policy.

Residing on an unincorporated county island, the HOA also functions as the de facto local government, providing private security services, collecting HOA dues for community maintenance, providing road repairs, maintaining emergency services to include contracted fire and ambulance services, providing curbside trash collection and recycling services, and other responsibilities routinely delegated to a local municipality. Additionally, the HOA issues building and construction permits and oversees its own building inspector and code enforcement.

=== Law enforcement ===
Leisure World employees a private security department for the protection of its residents, with the Maricopa County Sheriff's Department providing police services to its inhabitants.

=== Fire and medical ===
Fire and medical services for community residents are provided by contract from the Rural Metro fire department.

=== Parks and Recreation Department ===
The Recreation Center consists of a fitness center, and offers free admission to community residents and guests. Additionally, the community maintains an arts and craft building, sixteen pickleball courts, a 75-seat auditorium, a computer lab, community library, aquatic center, woodworking shop, 10 tennis courts, billiard room, ballroom, shuffleboard courts, a sports court, community meeting rooms, and two community golf courses. Additionally, the Recreation Department plans various annual educational opportunities, performing arts shows, community bus trips and over supports over 150 various clubs.
