= Concordia, New Jersey =

Populated place in Middlesex County, New Jersey, US

- Census-designated place
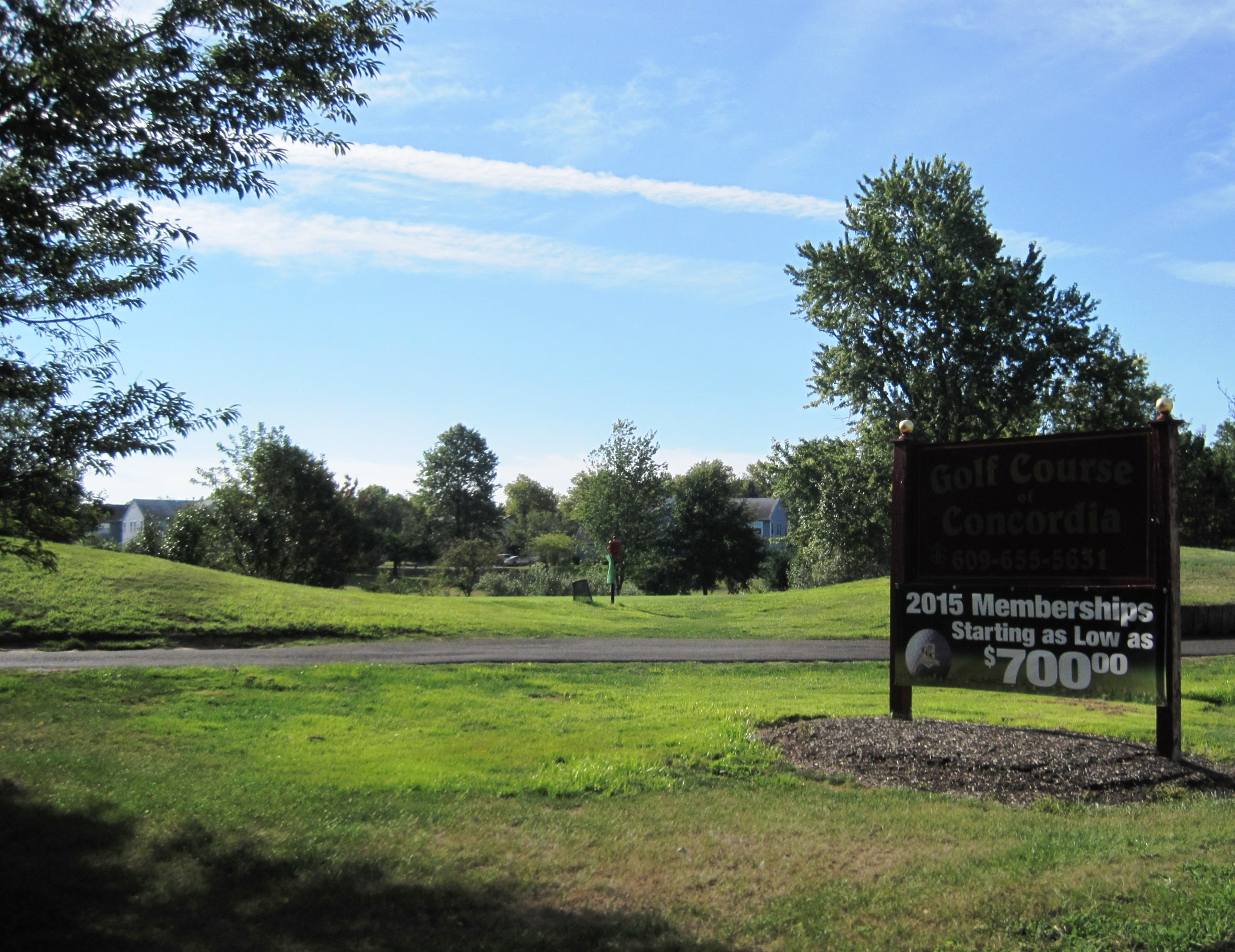
- Golf course at Concordia

- Location in Middlesex County and the state of New Jersey

- Location within Middlesex County, New Jersey Location within New Jersey Location within the United States
- Coordinates: 40.312616°N 74.44839°W
- Country: United States
- State: New Jersey
- County: Middlesex
- Township: Monroe

Area
  - Total: 0.79 sq mi (2.05 km^{2})
  - Land: 0.77 sq mi (1.99 km^{2})
  - Water: 0.019 sq mi (0.05 km^{2}) 2.43%
- Elevation: 144 ft (44 m)

Population (2020)
  - Total: 2,455
  - Density: 3,189.5/sq mi (1,231.48/km^{2})
- Time zone: UTC−05:00 (Eastern (EST))
  - Summer (DST): UTC−04:00 (Eastern (EDT))
- ZIP Code: 08831 (Monroe Township)
- FIPS code: 34-14758
- GNIS feature ID: 1867358

Concordia is an unincorporated community and census-designated place (CDP) in Monroe Township, Middlesex County, New Jersey, United States. The CDP is oriented around the age restricted gated community of Concordia. As of the 2020 United States census, the CDP's population was 2,455, down from 3,092 in 2010. Prior to 2020, the corner of Concordia known as The Ponds was split off into its own CDP.

== Geography ==
Concordia is in southern Middlesex County, in west-central Monroe Township. It is bordered to the north by Wittingham, to the southwest by The Ponds, and to the west by Clearbrook. Jamesburg, the closest borough, is 3 miles (5 km) to the north, while Hightstown is 6 miles (10 km) to the southwest.

According to the U.S. Census Bureau, the CDP has a total area of 0.791 square miles (2.049 km^{2}), including 0.770 square miles (1.994 km^{2}) of land and 0.021 square miles (0.054 km^{2}) of water (2.65%).

== Demographics ==
Historical population
Census	Pop.	Note	%±
1990	2,683		—
2000	3,658		36.3%
2010	3,092		−15.5%
2020	2,455		−20.6%
Population sources: 1950 1960 1970; 1980 1990 2000; 2010 2020

Concordia first appeared as a census designated place in the 1990 U.S. census.

=== Racial and ethnic composition ===
Concordia CDP, New Jersey – Racial and ethnic composition Note: the US Census treats Hispanic/Latino as an ethnic category. This table excludes Latinos from the racial categories and assigns them to a separate category. Hispanics/Latinos may be of any race.
Race / Ethnicity (NH = Non-Hispanic)	Pop 2000	Pop 2010	Pop 2020	% 2000	% 2010	% 2020
White alone (NH)	3,600	2,937	2,138	98.41%	94.99%	87.09%
Black or African American alone (NH)	19	68	80	0.52%	2.20%	3.26%
Native American or Alaska Native alone (NH)	0	0	0	0.00%	0.00%	0.00%
Asian alone (NH)	17	34	113	0.46%	1.10%	4.60%
Native Hawaiian or Pacific Islander alone (NH)	0	0	0	0.00%	0.00%	0.00%
Other race alone (NH)	2	0	6	0.05%	0.00%	0.24%
Mixed race or Multiracial (NH)	8	9	24	0.22%	0.29%	0.98%
Hispanic or Latino (any race)	12	44	94	0.33%	1.42%	3.83%
Total	3,658	3,092	2,455	100.00%	100.00%	100.00%

=== 2020 census ===
As of the 2020 census, Concordia had a population of 2,455. The median age was 73.0 years. 0.7% of residents were under the age of 18 and 79.5% were 65 years of age or older. For every 100 females, there were 61.5 males, and for every 100 females age 18 and over there were 61.2 males.

100.0% of residents lived in urban areas, while 0.0% lived in rural areas.

There were 1,604 households, of which 0.9% had children under the age of 18 living in them. Of all households, 39.4% were married-couple households, 10.2% were households with a male householder and no spouse or partner present, and 47.2% were households with a female householder and no spouse or partner present. About 50.2% of all households were made up of individuals, and 44.2% had someone living alone who was 65 years of age or older.

There were 1,773 housing units, of which 9.5% were vacant. The homeowner vacancy rate was 2.6% and the rental vacancy rate was 9.7%.

=== 2010 census ===
The 2010 United States census counted 3,092 people, 2,032 households, and 923 families in the CDP. The population density was 2,975.3 people per square mile (1,148.8 people/km^{2}). There were 2,261 housing units at an average density of 2,175.7 units per square mile (840.0 units/km^{2}). The racial makeup was 96.35% (2,979) White, 2.20% (68) Black or African American, 0.00% (0) Native American, 1.10% (34) Asian, 0.00% (0) Pacific Islander, 0.03% (1) from other races, and 0.32% (10) from two or more races. Hispanic or Latino of any race were 1.42% (44) of the population.

Of the 2,032 households, 0.1% had children under the age of 18; 43.4% were married couples living together; 1.7% had a female householder with no husband present and 54.6% were non-families. Of all households, 50.1% were made up of individuals and 44.0% had someone living alone who was 65 years of age or older. The average household size was 1.52 and the average family size was 2.04.

0.2% of the population were under the age of 18, 0.4% from 18 to 24, 1.0% from 25 to 44, 14.9% from 45 to 64, and 83.6% who were 65 years of age or older. The median age was 78.7 years. For every 100 females, the population had 60.7 males. For every 100 females ages 18 and older there were 60.7 males.

=== 2000 census ===
As of the 2000 United States census there were 3,658 people, 2,180 households, and 1,351 families living in the CDP. The population density was 1,345.1 people/km^{2} (3,484 people/mi^{2}). There were 2,341 housing units at an average density of 860.8 units/km^{2} (2,229 units/mi^{2}). The racial makeup of the CDP was 98.74% White, 0.52% African American, 0.46% Asian, 0.05% from other races, and 0.22% from two or more races. Hispanic or Latino of any race were 0.33% of the population.

There were 2,180 households, out of which 0.2% had children under the age of 18 living with them, 60.5% were married couples living together, 1.2% had a female householder with no husband present, and 38.0% were non-families. 35.4% of all households were made up of individuals, and 33.3% had someone living alone who was 65 years of age or older. The average household size was 1.68 and the average family size was 2.05.

In the CDP the population was spread out, with 0.4% under the age of 18, 0.1% from 18 to 24, 1.0% from 25 to 44, 10.1% from 45 to 64, and 88.5% who were 65 years of age or older. The median age was 74 years. For every 100 females, there were 72.5 males. For every 100 females age 18 and over, there were 72.3 males.

The median income for a household in the CDP was $43,382, and the median income for a family was $51,949. Males had a median income of $54,615 versus $32,250 for females. The per capita income for the CDP was $36,962. About 0.9% of families and 1.9% of the population were below the poverty line, including none of those under age 18 and 2.2% of those age 65 or over.
