= Whittingham, New Jersey =

Populated place in Middlesex County, New Jersey, US

- Census-designated place
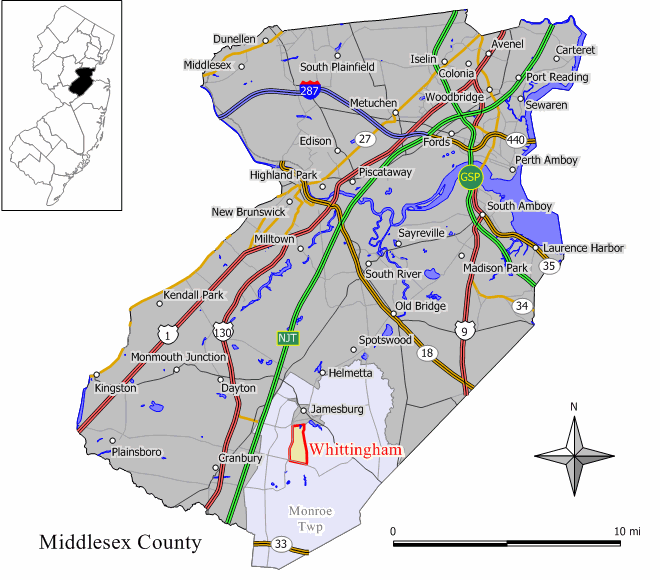
- Map of Whittingham highlighted within Middlesex County. Inset: Location of Middlesex County in New Jersey.

- Location in Middlesex County Location in New Jersey Location in the United States
- Coordinates: 40.330542°N 74.445603°W
- Country: United States
- State: New Jersey
- County: Middlesex
- Township: Monroe

Area
  - Total: 0.69 sq mi (1.78 km^{2})
  - Land: 0.69 sq mi (1.78 km^{2})
  - Water: 0.0039 sq mi (0.01 km^{2}) 0.60%
- Elevation: 161 ft (49 m)

Population (2020)
  - Total: 2,348
  - Density: 3,423.4/sq mi (1,321.78/km^{2})
- Time zone: UTC−05:00 (Eastern (EST))
  - Summer (DST): UTC−04:00 (Eastern (EDT))
- ZIP Code: 08831 (Monroe Township)
- Area code: 609
- FIPS code: 34-81042
- GNIS feature ID: 02390511

Whittingham, also known as Greenbriar at Whittingham, is an unincorporated community and census-designated place (CDP) in Monroe Township, Middlesex County, New Jersey, United States. As of the 2020 census, the CDP's population was 2,348. The area is focused around the age-restricted gated community of Whittingham.

== Geography ==
Whittingham is in southern Middlesex County, in west-central Monroe Township. It is bordered to the south by Concordia. The borough of Jamesburg is 2 miles (3 km) to the north, and Exit 8A on the New Jersey Turnpike is 3 miles (5 km) to the northwest.

According to the U.S. Census Bureau, the CDP has a total area of 0.688 square miles (1.782 km^{2}), of which 0.002 square miles (0.005 km^{2}), or 0.29%, are water. The community sits on a local drainage divide, with the southern part draining toward Cranbury Brook, a tributary of the Millstone River, and the northern part draining toward Manalapan Brook, a tributary of the South River. The entire community is within the Raritan River watershed.

== Demographics ==
Historical population
| Census | Pop. | Note | %± |
|---|---|---|---|
| 2000 | 2,483 | | — |
| 2010 | 2,476 | | −0.3% |
| 2020 | 2,348 | | −5.2% |
Population sources: 1950 1960 1970; 1980 1990 2000; 2010 2020

Whittingham first appeared as a census designated place in the 2000 U.S. census.

=== Racial and ethnic composition ===
Whittingham CDP, New Jersey – Racial and ethnic composition Note: the US Census treats Hispanic/Latino as an ethnic category. This table excludes Latinos from the racial categories and assigns them to a separate category. Hispanics/Latinos may be of any race.
| Race / Ethnicity (NH = Non-Hispanic) | Pop 2000 | Pop 2010 | Pop 2020 | % 2000 | % 2010 | % 2020 |
|---|---|---|---|---|---|---|
| White alone (NH) | 2,434 | 2,329 | 2,097 | 98.03% | 94.06% | 89.31% |
| Black or African American alone (NH) | 14 | 54 | 50 | 0.56% | 2.18% | 2.13% |
| Native American or Alaska Native alone (NH) | 1 | 0 | 0 | 0.04% | 0.00% | 0.00% |
| Asian alone (NH) | 12 | 50 | 106 | 0.48% | 2.02% | 4.51% |
| Native Hawaiian or Pacific Islander alone (NH) | 0 | 0 | 2 | 0.00% | 0.00% | 0.09% |
| Other race alone (NH) | 4 | 0 | 7 | 0.16% | 0.00% | 0.30% |
| Mixed race or Multiracial (NH) | 2 | 3 | 20 | 0.08% | 0.12% | 0.85% |
| Hispanic or Latino (any race) | 16 | 40 | 66 | 0.64% | 1.62% | 2.81% |
| Total | 2,483 | 2,476 | 2,348 | 100.00% | 100.00% | 100.00% |

=== 2020 census ===
As of the 2020 census, Whittingham had a population of 2,348. The median age was 77.4 years. 1.7% of residents were under the age of 18 and 81.8% of residents were 65 years of age or older. For every 100 females there were 67.7 males, and for every 100 females age 18 and over there were 67.2 males age 18 and over.

100.0% of residents lived in urban areas, while 0.0% lived in rural areas.

There were 1,503 households in Whittingham, of which 3.5% had children under the age of 18 living in them. Of all households, 45.7% were married-couple households, 10.8% were households with a male householder and no spouse or partner present, and 41.1% were households with a female householder and no spouse or partner present. About 47.1% of all households were made up of individuals and 44.0% had someone living alone who was 65 years of age or older.

There were 1,628 housing units, of which 7.7% were vacant. The homeowner vacancy rate was 1.4% and the rental vacancy rate was 0.0%.

=== 2010 census ===
The 2010 United States census counted 2,476 people, 1,416 households, and 862 families in the CDP. The population density was 2,483.2 people per square mile (958.8 people/km^{2}). There were 1,564 housing units at an average density of 1,568.6 units per square mile (605.6 units/km^{2}). The racial makeup was 95.48% (2,364) White, 2.22% (55) Black or African American, 0.00% (0) Native American, 2.02% (50) Asian, 0.00% (0) Pacific Islander, 0.16% (4) from other races, and 0.12% (3) from two or more races. Hispanic or Latino of any race were 1.62% (40) of the population.

Of the 1,416 households, 3.0% had children under the age of 18; 58.9% were married couples living together; 1.7% had a female householder with no husband present and 39.1% were non-families. Of all households, 35.7% were made up of individuals and 33.1% had someone living alone who was 65 years of age or older. The average household size was 1.75 and the average family size was 2.16.

3.3% of the population were under the age of 18, 1.3% from 18 to 24, 3.0% from 25 to 44, 11.3% from 45 to 64, and 81.1% who were 65 years of age or older. The median age was 75.3 years. For every 100 females, the population had 76.1 males. For every 100 females ages 18 and older there were 75.1 males.

=== 2000 census ===
As of the 2000 United States census there were 2,483 people, 1,339 households, and 1,033 families living in the CDP. The population density was 949.2 people/km^{2} (2,458 people/mi^{2}). There were 1,414 housing units at an average density of 540.5 units/km^{2} (1,400 units/mi^{2}). The racial makeup of the CDP was 98.59% White, 0.56% African American, 0.04% Native American, 0.48% Asian, 0.24% from other races, and 0.08% from two or more races. Hispanic or Latino of any race were 0.64% of the population.

There were 1,339 households, out of which 0.7% had children under the age of 18 living with them, 75.7% were married couples living together, 1.2% had a female householder with no husband present, and 22.8% were non-families. 20.5% of all households were made up of individuals, and 16.9% had someone living alone who was 65 years of age or older. The average household size was 1.85 and the average family size was 2.07.

In the CDP the population was spread out, with 0.8% under the age of 18, 0.3% from 18 to 24, 1.9% from 25 to 44, 25.7% from 45 to 64, and 71.3% who were 65 years of age or older. The median age was 69 years. For every 100 females, there were 84.7 males. For every 100 females age 18 and over, there were 84.0 males.

The median income for a household in the CDP was $57,273, and the median income for a family was $66,346. Males had a median income of $70,556 versus $35,833 for females. The per capita income for the CDP was $40,447. About 1.3% of families and 2.3% of the population were below the poverty line, including none of those under age 18 and 1.6% of those age 65 or over.
