= Retirement community =

Town or housing complex for older adults who are generally able to care for themselves

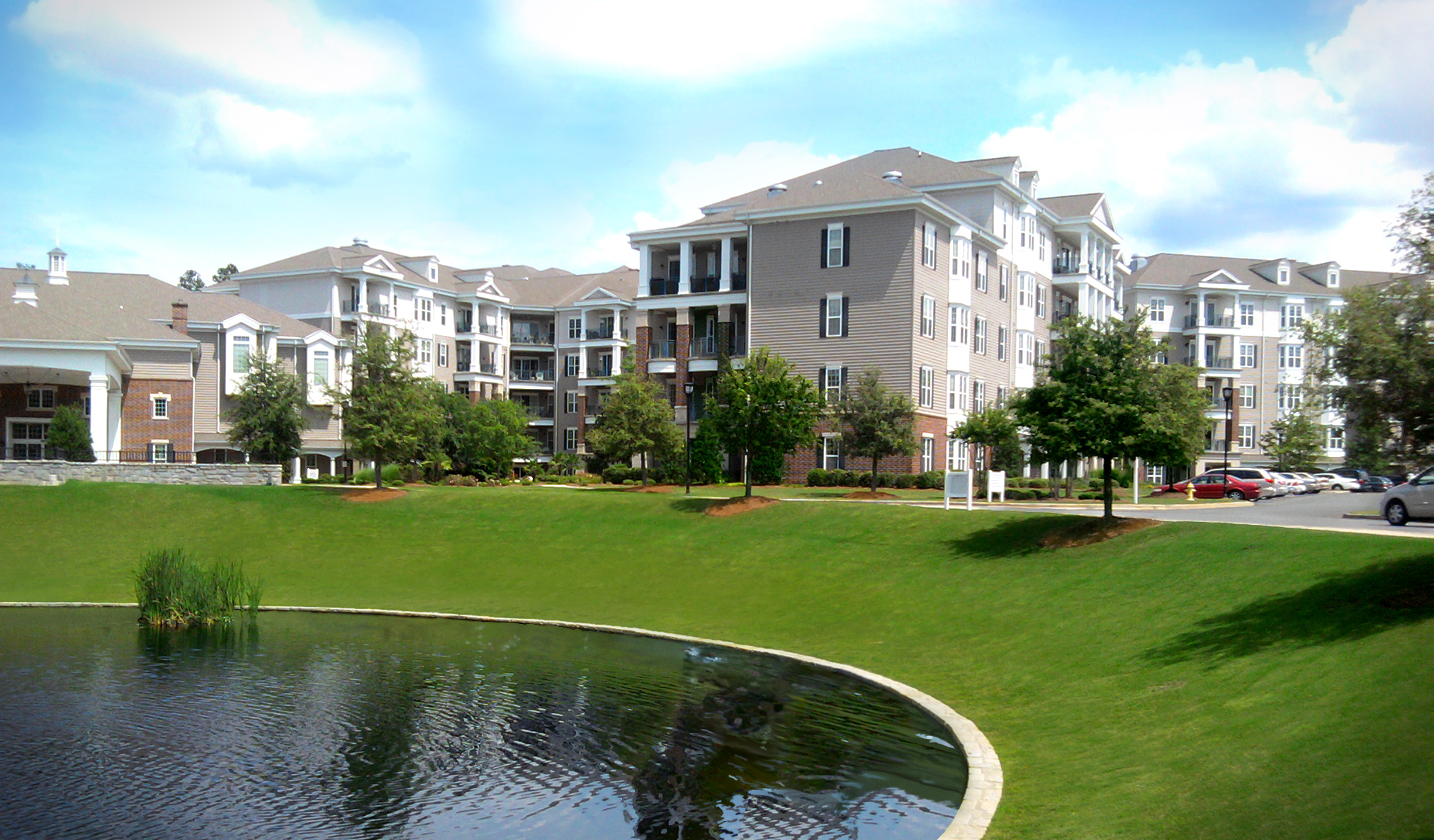
Spring Harbor Retirement Community in Columbus, Georgia in the United States

A retirement community is a residential community or housing complex designed for older adults who are generally able to care for themselves. Assistance from home care agencies is allowed in some communities, and activities and socialization opportunities are often provided. Some of the characteristics typically are: the community must be age-restricted or age-qualified, residents must be partially or fully retired, and the community offers shared services or amenities.

There are various types of retirement communities older adults can choose from, and new types of retirement communities are being developed as the population ages. Examples of retirement community types include:

- assisted living communities, also known as assisted living and memory care assisted living communities, which provide all the daily services seniors need in an apartment or condominium style environment - such as activities, dining, housekeeping, nursing, and wellness - usually in a locked and secured building;
- congregate housing, which includes at least one shared meal per day with other residents;
- continuing care retirement communities, see below;
- elder/senior cohousing, multiple individually owned housing units oriented around a common area and a common house;
- Independent senior living communities, also known as independent living communities, which offer no personal care services;
- leisure or lifestyle oriented communities or LORCs, which include various amenities;
- mobile homes or RV's for active adults;
- subsidized housing for lower income older adults.

Retirement communities are often built in warm climates, and are common in Alabama, Arizona, California, Florida, Georgia, Hawaii, Louisiana, Mississippi, Nevada, and Texas, but they are increasingly being built in and around major cities throughout the United States. The oldest known and longest continuously running retirement community in the United States is Ryderwood, Washington. Ryderwood was originally established in 1923 as a Long-Bell logging camp, then was sold to Senior Estates, Inc. in 1953 to create a retirement community. Senior Estates, Inc. converted the town into a retirement community. Time Magazine covered the event in the real estate section with the article "Old Folks at Home". As of 2019, Ryderwood remains a retirement community. Del Webb opened Sun City, Arizona, with the active adult concept, in 1960. In 2011, The Villages, Florida became the largest of these communities. While new retirement communities have developed in various areas of the United States, they are largely marketed to older adults who are financially secure. Lower income retirement communities are rare except for government subsidized housing, which neglects a large proportion of older adults who have fewer financial resources.

== History ==
Retirement communities have been around since the 1920s and 1930s.

== Continuing care retirement communities ==
Continuing care retirement community (CCRC) is the primary term for a major part of the retirement scene, in books, magazines, accreditation and legislation. A typical definition, from a New York Department of Health website is "Continuing care retirement communities (CCRCs) and fee-for-service continuing care retirement communities (FFSCCRCs) are residential alternatives for adults that offer, under one contract, an independent living unit (an apartment or cottage), residential amenities and access to a continuum of long-term care services, as residents' health and social needs change over time." The accrediting agency CCRC/CARF uses the term CCRC with the same meaning.

In 2010, over 2,000 CCRCs existed in the United States with an estimated 640,000 residents. The popularity of CCRCs is increasing, as the number of older adults in such retirement communities has more than doubled during the last decade. The primary benefit of the CCRC model is that it allows people to age in one community and receive additional healthcare services if needed. Additionally, CCRCs embody a general sense of community and offer peace of mind for couples with the assurance that they will always be near each other, even if one spouse needs more care.

There are three levels of care in most CCRCs and when residents' health needs increase, they will transition from one level to the next. The levels are:

1. Independent living, in which residents live on their own and have access to a wide array of amenities
2. Assisted living, which provides help with daily tasks such as bathing and dressing
3. 24-hour nursing home-style care.

Most CCRCs include an entrance fee and a monthly fee, and these costs vary widely depending on several factors: the luxuriousness of the facility, the size and type of housing unit, whether the person enters alone or with a spouse, and how much future care is covered (this could be through insurance, government plans, or out of pocket). Fees tend to be expensive and usually do not include additional services such as phone and television. Additionally, residents should plan on a 3-6% increase in monthly fees each year.

CCRC's usually offer various payment plans, which are listed below:

1. Life care: Residents pay a large entrance fee (average $270,000) and pay a set monthly fee (average $2,750) that does not increase if additional healthcare is needed
2. Modified: Residents pay a lower entrance fee (average $239,000) and their initial monthly fees (average $2,400) cover a certain amount of higher-level care. The monthly fees rise when further care is needed (assisted living average $4,400; nursing care average $8,200).
3. Pay as you go: Residents pay a lower entrance fee (average $238,000), but initial monthly fees (average $2,000) increase when additional care is needed (assisted living average $4,300; nursing care average $7,700)

One risk of entering a CCRC is that most will refund only a portion or none of the entrance fee if a resident chooses to leave the community. The same refund policies exist when a resident passes away. Persons considering moving into a CCRC may wish to research existing CCRCs before committing to one.

According to a literature review, CCRCs have been found to be generally described by the elderly as friendly places where new friends are made. However, previous research has also highlighted the difficulty of socially integrating the frail and very old.

== Elder/senior cohousing ==
Elder cohousing, also known as senior cohousing, is a living arrangement in which multiple individually owned housing units are oriented around a common open area and a common house. Residents actively cooperate to live in a neighborhood characterized by socialization and mutual support. The idea for elder cohousing originated in Denmark, where intergenerational cohousing was successfully implemented; intergenerational housing communities are planned, owned, and managed by the residents, who all share in many daily activities together. This idea spun off the idea of an age-specific cohousing model for active elders, in which community designs permit easy access for all levels of physical ability. There may also be options to include studio residencies in the common house to provide living quarters for home health aids, whose services may be shared by several residents.

To be considered a "cohousing community" the following six defining characteristics must be present:

1. Participatory process – the future residents participate in the design so that it meets their needs
2. Neighborhood design – the physical layout and orientation of the buildings encourage a sense of community
3. Common facilities
4. Resident management
5. Non-hierarchical structure and decision making
6. No shared community economy

=== Age requirements ===
At least 80% of the units in the community must include an individual aged 55 or older, to meet the age requirements to qualify as "senior housing".

=== History ===
As previously stated, the cohousing living model was first observed in Denmark. There, the communities are known as bofoellesskaber, which translates to "living communities". K. McCamant and C. Durrett coined the term "cohousing", and launched it in the United States in the 1970s. Since its introduction to the U.S. intergenerational cohousing communities have been developed in at least 21 states.

== Niche retirement communities in the United States ==
Niche retirement communities target retirees who "share a common interest, hobby or trait". By 2011, niche retirement communities or "niche senior communities' - known as "affinity retirement communities" by industry professionals - had become "one of the biggest trends in retirement living." These communities attract those over 55 who want to be in communities of like-minded individuals from the same ethnic background (for example, Aegis Living for Asian-Americans in Fremont, California or first-generation Indian immigrants (55-and-over) in Tavares, Florida, in the Greater Orlando area, Lake County, Florida), sexual orientation (RainbowVision in Santa Fe, New Mexico~~,~~ ) or for those who share an interest such as academia and lifelong learning (in dozens of university-based retirement communities (UBRC) for example at Eckerd College, Holy Cross Village at Notre Dame, Indiana), Penn State University, Stanford University, University of Florida, creative expression and artists (for example the Burbank Senior Artists Colony, the Long Beach Senior Arts Colony, Meta Housing and EngAGE in California), astronomers, golf, RV aficionados (Escapees CARE center in Livingston, Texas), veterans, vegetarians, fans of Big 10 football games and country music (Nashville, Tenn).~~"~~

In the United States alone there are approximately 80 million people who were born between 1946 and 1964 - the baby boomers ~~-~~ who control about $25 trillion in wealth. By 2011 there were already over 100 niche communities.

Andrew Carle, founding director of the Program in Senior Housing Administration at George Mason University, Fairfax, Virginia observed that the baby boomers " ... set the record for embracing fad products, and that'll likely translate over into the niche retirement community as well ... targeted toward people with specific interests and backgrounds, from Big 10 football games and country music to gay-friendly lifestyles."

In Florida alone there are niche retirement communities for Polk County retired letter carriers (which was union-built); for car buffs and RVers, such as Lake Weir Preserve in Marion County; for first-generation Indian immigrants (55-and-over) in Tavares, in the Greater Orlando area, Lake County, Florida. The Villages, in Sumter County, Florida- Florida's most well-known and fastest-growing retirement community development is the state's "biggest example of a culturally and ethnically homogeneous retirement community" with a 98.4% white population. The Villages, a gated community with low crime rates, offers "free golf for life" on their executive golf courses.

Colleges have created options for retired alumni who enjoy campus life, for example, at the University of Florida in Gainesville and Eckerd College in St. Petersburg's College Harbor Retirement Community, with its Academy of Senior Professionals.

There are downsides to living in niche retirement communities. According to research by Harvard Law professor Cass Sunstein, "[p]eople who surround themselves by like-minded people are more likely to become more extreme in their views. Sunstein observed increasing polarization in the United States in "ideologically-homogeneous communities" where groups composed of exclusively like-minded people isolate themselves from the wider, mainstream community and have limited exposure to alternative viewpoints. Carle also noted that residents in affinity communities can get burnt out with their life centered around what was once a favorite hobby.

=== LGBT retirement communities in the United States ===
Currently, there are over 3 million lesbian, gay, bisexual, and transgender (LGBT) persons over the age of 65 in the United States, and this number is estimated to rise to 4 million by the year 2020. LGBT elders face many additional issues concerning their future retirement plans and their choice of a retirement residence. Approximately two-thirds do not have children, and up to one-half live alone, so LGBT persons may have a lack of support in their retirement years. Since LGBT couples are often not legally recognized, spouses are often excluded in late-life decisions, inheritance claims, and spousal pension and social security plans. Several healthcare concerns exist for older LGBT adults, including increased incidence of illness and disease, lack of disclosure about sexual orientation to health providers, and lack of support for individual needs. And LGBT persons have increasing concern about discrimination as they age and fear that most retirement communities do not recognize the special needs of LGBT elders or offer supportive services; one study found that LGBT persons are least likely to choose a retirement community as a residence due to fears of unmet needs and heterosexism that occurs in many retirement communities.

== Naturally occurring retirement communities ==
The NORC model allows people to retire in their existing homes and encourages communities of seniors to band together to provide mutual assistance. NORCs can be very effective mechanisms to identify populations of people who need government-provided services and then provide those services in cost-effective ways. They may serve people of all income levels, e.g., those who get together to furnish cost-effective transportation services; they may involve low-income residents receiving a richer mix of public services through a NORC model; or they may serve relatively affluent households and charge $1,000 or even more in annual dues to support staffers who provide a rich variety of support services and cultural enrichment activities.

== Recreation ==
Focus groups indicate a strong correlation between life in retirement communities, and participation in recreational and leisure activities. Residents of retirement communities mirror the general population in associating positive emotions with active engagement and negative emotions (particularly guilt) with idleness. There are many forms of recreation within each retirement community:

- Tabletop games
- Social activities
- Spiritual enrichment
- Dancing
- Sports
- Arts

Pickleball, in particular, is seeing growing popularity in retirement communities. Over 36 million Americans play pickleball, and many retirees enjoy it for its social aspects and low-impact fitness.

"As per the American Therapeutic Recreation Association, recreation therapy can be defined as 'a systematic process that utilizes recreation and other activity-based interventions to address the assessed needs of individuals with illnesses and/or disabling conditions, as a means to psychological and physical health, recovery and well-being.'

In simple terms, a recreational therapist helps his patients take part in recreational activities that they enjoy. Recreational therapy has been shown to improve cognitive skills, social interactions and reduce depression in seniors living in several senior cares and assisted living facilities across the country.~~"~~

"Overall, recreational therapy is a tool that should be utilized by all seniors. This form of therapy allows seniors to socialize, stimulate their brains, and participate in activities that help build overall health and self-confidence." Therapeutic Recreation can add value to retirement communities in ways of achieving goals like no other program can. A certified therapeutic recreation specialist undergoes extensive training on how to rehabilitate and help individuals in their perspective field. They achieve this through a series of different interventions compiled from evidence based research such as:

- Art therapy
- Music therapy
- Equine therapy
- Aqua therapy
- Cognitive-behavioral therapy
- Psychodynamic therapy
- Family therapy

== Best places to retire lists ==
Although the total number of retirement communities continues to increase as the elderly population continues similar growth, certain places, cities, and locations are considered higher rated than others. A number of publishers have created lists of the 100 best retirement communities or "100 best places (or towns) to retire". For the most part these lists are helpful in terms of finding desirable communities to live in. The extent to which desirable amenities are "priced" in labor markets (lower wages in nice places) or housing markets (higher housing prices in nice places) will have a large impact on their appeal for elderly retirees who no longer have to pay in the labor market. Generally, the more amenities and services offered, the more you may expect to pay for retirement living in a senior community. Living in a highly desirable area where senior housing options are limited could also push up the final price tag

== Some non-U.S. retirement communities ==
=== Canada ===
- Arbutus Ridge Seaside Community for Active Adults, in the Cowichan Valley on Vancouver Island, was the first comprehensive retirement community built in Canada. It is a private community that subsequently became the template and proving ground for what has become accepted and commonplace. In 2015, that template was expanded in line with the growing desire for spiritually focused retirement living, as Global Kingdom Ministries unveiled Trinity Ravine Towers in Toronto, one of the country's first Christian community living condominium complexes.
- Cobourg, Ontario boasts a large population of senior citizens "as well as a number of excellent retirement homes that cover the spectrum of care from independent living to long-term care"

=== India ===
In India, the traditional family system in which elders would be cared for by their children is still in vogue but a new generation of elders who value their independence has evolved. This has necessitated the development of retirement homes and communities in India. In response, one recent trend beginning to emerge in the Indian retirement industry is the "retirement resort": a long-term rental unit within a resort-like community that features many of the amenities of a traditional vacation resort.

=== New Zealand ===
In New Zealand about half the retirement villages are provided by the 'Big Six commercial operators (Ryman, Metlife Care, Summerset, Bupa, Arvida and Oceania). Some are provided by charitable organisations e.g. churches and Freemasons.

The New Zealand Retirement Commission (Te Ara Ahunga Ora) offers advice on choosing a retirement village.

=== United Kingdom ===
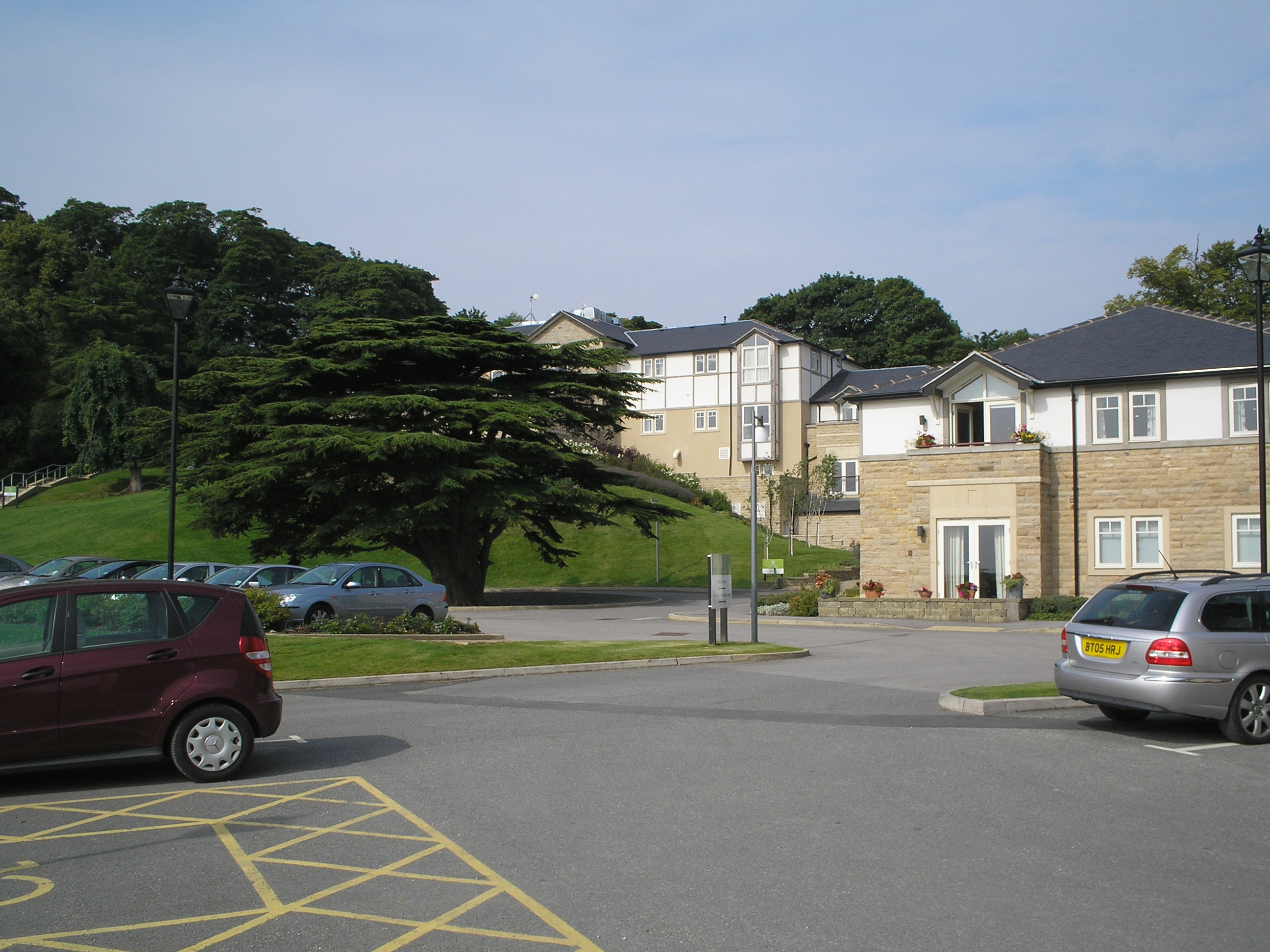
Retirement village in Ilkley, England

In the United Kingdom retirement villages have become increasingly prevalent; according to a BBC report of August 2009, there were approximately 25,000 people across the UK living within a retirement village model at that date. Another growing trend, witnessed recently, is the emergence of Holiday Retirement Community Living.

Models vary, from local authority funded and charitable schemes such as Hartrigg Oaks in York, led by the Joseph Rowntree Trust, to privately funded projects and retirement communities such as Audley Cooper's Hill in Englefield Green by Audley Villages, Roseland Parc in Cornwall by Retirement Villages Ltd, Fleet house retirement village in Devon, and Boughton Hall in Chester by Enterprise Retirement Living Ltd.

The ExtraCare Charitable Trust operates 14 retirement villages across the UK. Founded in 1988, ExtraCare has collaborated with numerous universities to develop their services. Research projects have included working with local nurseries to bring groups of children into retirement villages, as documented on the Channel 4 series "Old People's Home For 4 Year Olds".

An umbrella organisation called the Associated Retirement Community Operators works to collaborate thinking and best practice in the retirement homes market.

A study of 2,799 residents from 81 retirement communities run by 15 operators, compared with 1000 people considering moving into a community carried out in 2019, found that community residents stayed healthier for longer, were more active, less lonely and felt more secure.

== In popular culture ==
- In the HBO series The Sopranos, Tony Soprano, Paulie Gualtieri, and several other Mafiosi move their mothers to Green Grove, an upscale retirement community in New Jersey, which figures prominently in the plot lines of several seasons. In multiple episodes, characters correct those who refer to Green Grove as a nursing home, advising that it is a "retirement community". Additionally, Junior Soprano seems sharp and gets up to his old tricks while incarcerated at an upscale residence, where he undergoes court-ordered evaluation and which stay is financed by Tony, but in season 6 Junior is moved to a downscale government-run home, and his mental condition has shown to have considerably worsened.
- The British 1990s sitcom Waiting for God is set at the fictional Bayview Retirement Home (more accurately a retirement village, with a main house and separate living areas for residents), with the main characters being home's residents, their families, and the home's staff.
- The British 2020 murder mystery novel The Thursday Murder Club' is set in a luxurious retirement village Cooper's Chase near the fictitious village of Fairhaven in Kent. England. The author Richard Osman has written three sequel novels,
- The Best Exotic Marigold Hotel is a 2011 British comedy-drama film about a group of British pensioners who move to an Indian retirement hotel, and was among the highest-grossing film releases in 2012. Based on a 2004 novel by Deborah Moggach, a sequel film and a stage play have been made.

== See also ==
- Age-restricted community
- Eldercare
- Nursing home
- Transgenerational design
- Veterans Health Administration
