= Encore at Monroe, New Jersey =

Populated place in Middlesex County, New Jersey, US

Encore at Monroe
- Census-designated place
- Location in Middlesex County Location in New Jersey Location in the United States
- Coordinates: 40°19′11″N 74°28′0″W
- Country: United States
- State: New Jersey
- County: Middlesex
- Township: Monroe

Area
  - Total: 0.19 sq mi (0.50 km^{2})
  - Land: 0.19 sq mi (0.50 km^{2})
  - Water: 0 sq mi (0.00 km^{2})
- Elevation: 130 ft (40 m)

Population (2020)
  - Total: 625
  - Density: 3,253.2/sq mi (1,256.05/km^{2})
- Time zone: UTC−05:00 (Eastern (EST))
  - Summer (DST): UTC−04:00 (EDT)
- ZIP Code: 08831 (Monroe Township)
- Area codes: 732/848
- FIPS code: 34-21473
- GNIS feature ID: 2806079

Encore at Monroe is a gated community and census-designated place (CDP) in Monroe Township, Middlesex County, New Jersey, United States. As of the 2020 census, it had a population of 625.

== Geography ==
It is in southern Middlesex County, in the western part of Monroe Township, and is bordered to the south by Clearbrook. It is 3 miles (5 km) southwest of Jamesburg, 15 miles (24 km) south of New Brunswick, 6 miles (10 km) northeast of Hightstown, and 18 miles (29 km) northeast of Trenton.

According to the U.S. Census Bureau, the community has an area of 0.193 square miles (0.500 km^{2}), of which 0.001 square miles (0.003 km^{2}), or 0.52%, are water. The community drains westward toward Cranbury Brook, a west-flowing tributary of the Millstone River and part of the Raritan River watershed.

== Demographics ==
Historical population
Census	Pop.	Note	%±
2020	625		—
U.S. Decennial Census; 2020

Encore at Monroe first appeared as a census designated place in the 2020 U.S. census.

Encore at Monroe CDP, New Jersey – Racial and ethnic composition Note: the US Census treats Hispanic/Latino as an ethnic category. This table excludes Latinos from the racial categories and assigns them to a separate category. Hispanics/Latinos may be of any race.
Race / Ethnicity (NH = Non-Hispanic)	Pop 2020	2020
White alone (NH)	544	87.04%
Black or African American alone (NH)	22	3.52%
Native American or Alaska Native alone (NH)	0	0.00%
Asian alone (NH)	31	4.96%
Native Hawaiian or Pacific Islander alone (NH)	0	0.00%
Other race alone (NH)	0	0.00%
Mixed race or Multiracial (NH)	9	1.44%
Hispanic or Latino (any race)	19	3.04%
Total	625	100.00%

As of 2020, the population of the area was 625.
