= Sun City Texas =

- Community
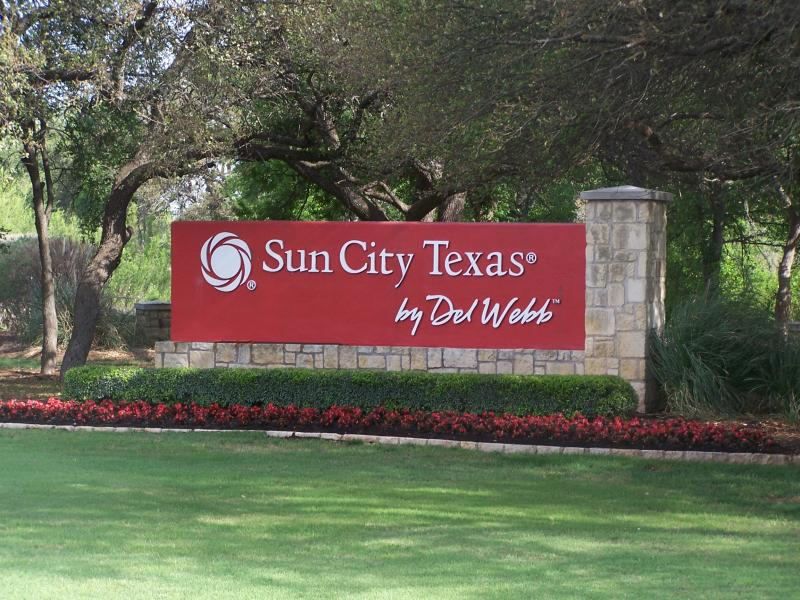
- Main entry to Sun City Texas
- Interactive map of Sun City Texas
- Coordinates: <30.718215°N 97.714515°W
- Country: United States
- State: Texas
- County: Williamson County
- City: Georgetown

Population (2021)
  - Total: 15,700

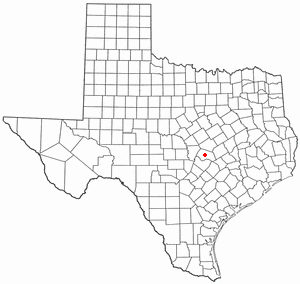
Location of Georgetown, Texas

Sun City Texas is a 4,750-acre (19.2 km^{2}) age-restricted community located in Georgetown, Texas, a city 35 miles north of Austin off Interstate 35. It is part of the chain of Sun City communities started by Del Webb.

Del Webb, a publicly traded company when Sun City Texas was originally conceived and through the first several years of homebuilding, was later sold to PulteGroup. Residency is restricted to persons over age 55, or in the case of couples, one of which must be 55 years of age (except in the instance of guardianship and marriage). Sun City Texas is made up predominantly of single-family dwellings, but also has a few duplexes. For marketing purposes, near the new Sales Center, there are a limited number of houses called the Explore Del Webb Program (each complete with a golf cart), which are used for providing low-cost overnight accommodations for prospects to "live the life" of Sun City for a few days. Total build-out is approved by Georgetown for approximately 10,550 homes, which equals a total of approximately 18,500 residents.

== Activities ==
The community is generally oriented toward recent retirees. However, demographically, Sun City often is not the last home where someone will live after retirement, but rather it is the first home of retirement for "active adults" who actively play tennis, golf, dance, do yoga, or participate in numerous activities and clubs. Over the years, the average age of residents has crept up to about 71.

Due to a change in state law initiated by the developer, it is legal to drive licensed "golf cars" on the streets in the development and the shopping areas and all activity centers throughout Sun City have special parking spaces for the golf cars.

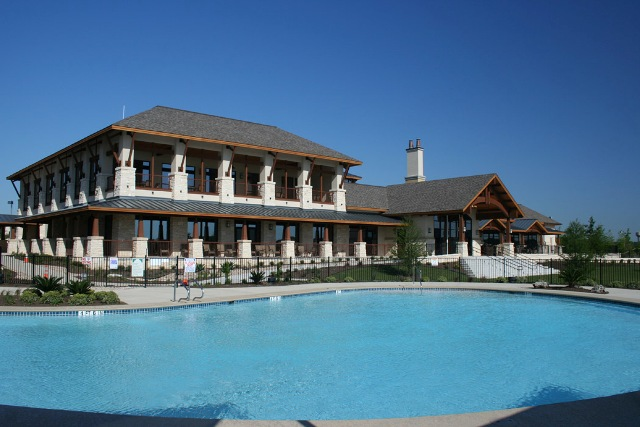
The Cowan Creek Activity Center is the one of four activity centers.

There are three golf courses, a large central activity center (with a ballroom, meeting rooms, a library and business center), hobby facilities (including woodworking, computer lab, ceramics studio, dancing, and others), numerous pools, lakes for fishing, and many other recreational facilities. Four "satellite" activity centers are located across the development, each with indoor and outdoor pools, aerobic and dance studios, and many other facilities. There are clubs for almost any interest, such as an active nature club that takes advantage of the 14 miles (22.53 km) of nature walks and special ecological features of the site.

The community's proximity to Southwestern University provides access to various additional cultural activities. The city of Austin is nearby, providing a rich variety of urban activities, and the surrounding Hill Country region provides many opportunities for outdoor activities.

== Voting strength ==
The project is located within the incorporated city limits of the City of Georgetown and receives water, wastewater, and electric service from the city. Because of its size relative to the city, and the high-growth rate within Sun City, the project has a significant impact on the local demographics. In elections, voter turnout in Sun City precincts typically exceeds 90 percent. As a result of the redistricting of council districts in 2011, two of the six single-member city council districts are composed predominantly of Sun City residents, and a former mayor, George Garver (as of 2011), is a Sun City resident and was a former city council member.

== Target audiences ==
Although the community attracts residents from all over the country, it has proved especially popular with retirees from the Upper Midwest because of the lower cost of living and relatively mild climate, but residents from Dallas and Houston who want to live in the Texas Hill Country are also target prospects. The project name at the beginning of the development was "Sun City Georgetown", but the name was later changed to Sun City Texas because of its focus on attracting residents throughout the state. In 2007, Georgetown was named by Retirement Places Rated (Seventh Edition) as the "Best Place in America to Retire".

== Golf courses ==
- Legacy Hills
- White Wing
- Cowan Creek

== Notable residents ==
- Murray Wier, former professional basketball player

- Bob Lilly, Hall of Fame NFL defensive tackle, first-ever draft pick of the Dallas Cowboys
