= Clearbrook, New Jersey =

Populated place in Middlesex County, New Jersey, US

- Census-designated place

- Location in Middlesex County Location in New Jersey Location in the United States
- Coordinates: 40°18′37″N 74°27′53″W
- Country: United States
- State: New Jersey
- County: Middlesex
- Township: Monroe

Area
  - Total: 0.76 sq mi (1.97 km^{2})
  - Land: 0.76 sq mi (1.96 km^{2})
  - Water: 0.0039 sq mi (0.01 km^{2})
- Elevation: 110 ft (34 m)

Population (2020)
  - Total: 2,909
  - Density: 3,841.9/sq mi (1,483.38/km^{2})
- Time zone: UTC−05:00 (Eastern (EST))
  - Summer (DST): UTC−04:00 (EDT)
- ZIP Code: 08831 (Monroe Township)
- Area codes: 732/848
- FIPS code: 34-13395
- GNIS feature ID: 2389330

Clearbrook is a gated community and census-designated place (CDP) in Monroe Township, Middlesex County, New Jersey, United States. As of the 2020 United States census, the CDP's population was 2,909, up from 2,667 in 2010.

== Geography ==
Clearbrook is in southern Middlesex County, on the western side of Monroe Township. The community is bordered to the north by Encore at Monroe and to the east by Concordia and The Ponds. It is 3.5 miles (5.6 km) southwest of Jamesburg and 5 miles (8 km) northeast of Hightstown.

According to the U.S. Census Bureau, the Clearbrook CDP has a total area of 0.761 square miles (1.971 km^{2}), including 0.757 square miles (1.961 km^{2}) of land and 0.004 square miles (0.010 km^{2}) of water (0.53%). The community drains west toward Cranbury Brook, a west-flowing tributary of the Millstone River and part of the Raritan River watershed.

== Demographics ==
The CDP first appeared in the 1990 U.S. census under the name Clearbrook Park; and was renamed Clearbrook in the 2020 U.S. census.

=== Racial and ethnic composition ===
Clearbrook CDP, New Jersey – Racial and ethnic composition Note: the US Census treats Hispanic/Latino as an ethnic category. This table excludes Latinos from the racial categories and assigns them to a separate category. Hispanics/Latinos may be of any race.
Race / Ethnicity (NH = Non-Hispanic)	Pop 2000	Pop 2010	Pop 2020	% 2000	% 2010	% 2020
White alone (NH)	2,988	2,447	2,371	97.87%	91.75%	81.51%
Black or African American alone (NH)	25	88	157	0.82%	3.30%	5.40%
Native American or Alaska Native alone (NH)	0	0	5	0.00%	0.00%	0.17%
Asian alone (NH)	9	48	148	0.29%	1.80%	5.09%
Pacific Islander alone (NH)	0	0	0	0.00%	0.00%	0.00%
Other race alone (NH)	0	0	13	0.00%	0.00%	0.45%
Mixed race or Multiracial (NH)	10	9	44	0.33%	0.34%	1.51%
Hispanic or Latino (any race)	21	75	171	0.69%	2.81%	5.88%
Total	3,053	2,667	2,909	100.00%	100.00%	100.00%

=== 2020 census ===
As of the 2020 census, Clearbrook had a population of 2,909. The median age was 72.1 years. 1.5% of residents were under the age of 18 and 72.7% were 65 years of age or older. For every 100 females there were 65.8 males, and for every 100 females age 18 and over there were 65.1 males age 18 and over.

100.0% of residents lived in urban areas, while 0.0% lived in rural areas.

There were 1,899 households in Clearbrook, of which 2.0% had children under the age of 18 living in them. Of all households, 38.1% were married-couple households, 14.3% were households with a male householder and no spouse or partner present, and 44.2% were households with a female householder and no spouse or partner present. About 50.3% of all households were made up of individuals and 42.2% had someone living alone who was 65 years of age or older.

There were 2,045 housing units, of which 7.1% were vacant. The homeowner vacancy rate was 2.1% and the rental vacancy rate was 5.7%.

=== 2010 census ===
The 2010 United States census counted 2,667 people, 1,803 households, and 736 families in the CDP. The population density was 3,051.3 people per square mile (1,178.1 people/km^{2}). There were 2,006 housing units at an average density of 2,295.1 units per square mile (886.1 units/km^{2}). The racial makeup was 94.30% (2,515) White, 3.30% (88) Black or African American, 0.00% (0) Native American, 1.80% (48) Asian, 0.00% (0) Pacific Islander, 0.26% (7) from other races, and 0.34% (9) from two or more races. Hispanic or Latino of any race were 2.81% (75) of the population.

Of the 1,803 households, 0.3% had children under the age of 18; 37.8% were married couples living together; 2.6% had a female householder with no husband present and 59.2% were non-families. Of all households, 54.9% were made up of individuals and 49.0% had someone living alone who was 65 years of age or older. The average household size was 1.48 and the average family size was 2.06.

0.3% of the population were under the age of 18, 0.3% from 18 to 24, 0.8% from 25 to 44, 18.0% from 45 to 64, and 80.5% who were 65 years of age or older. The median age was 78.1 years. For every 100 females, the population had 62.1 males. For every 100 females ages 18 and older there were 62.0 males.

=== 2000 census ===
According to the 2000 United States census there were 3,053 people, 1,947 households, and 1,006 families living in the CDP. The population density was 1,386.8 people/km^{2} (3,592 people/mi^{2}). There were 2,067 housing units at an average density of 938.9 units/km^{2} (2,432 units/mi^{2}). The racial makeup of the CDP was 98.56% White, 0.82% African American, 0.29% Asian, and 0.33% from two or more races. Hispanic or Latino of any race were 0.69% of the population.

There were 1,947 households, out of which 0.5% had children under the age of 18 living with them, 49.2% were married couples living together, 2.2% had a female householder with no husband present, and 48.3% were non-families. 46.2% of all households were made up of individuals, and 44.1% had someone living alone who was 65 years of age or older. The average household size was 1.57 and the average family size was 2.06.

In the CDP the population was spread out, with 0.8% under the age of 18, 0.1% from 18 to 24, 1.1% from 25 to 44, 7.6% from 45 to 64, and 90.4% who were 65 years of age or older. The median age was 76 years. For every 100 females, there were 66.2 males. For every 100 females age 18 and over, there were 66.1 males.

Historical population
Census	Pop.	Note	%±
1990	2,853		—
2000	3,053		7.0%
2010	2,667		−12.6%
2020	2,909		9.1%
Population sources: 1990-2010 2000 2010 2020

The median income for a household in the CDP was $36,506, and the median income for a family was $49,228. Males had a median income of $36,429 versus $49,375 for females. The per capita income for the CDP was $29,688. None of the families and 2.2% of the population were living below the poverty line, including no under eighteens and 2.2% of those over 64.
