= Arbutus Ridge, Cowichan Valley =

- Designated place
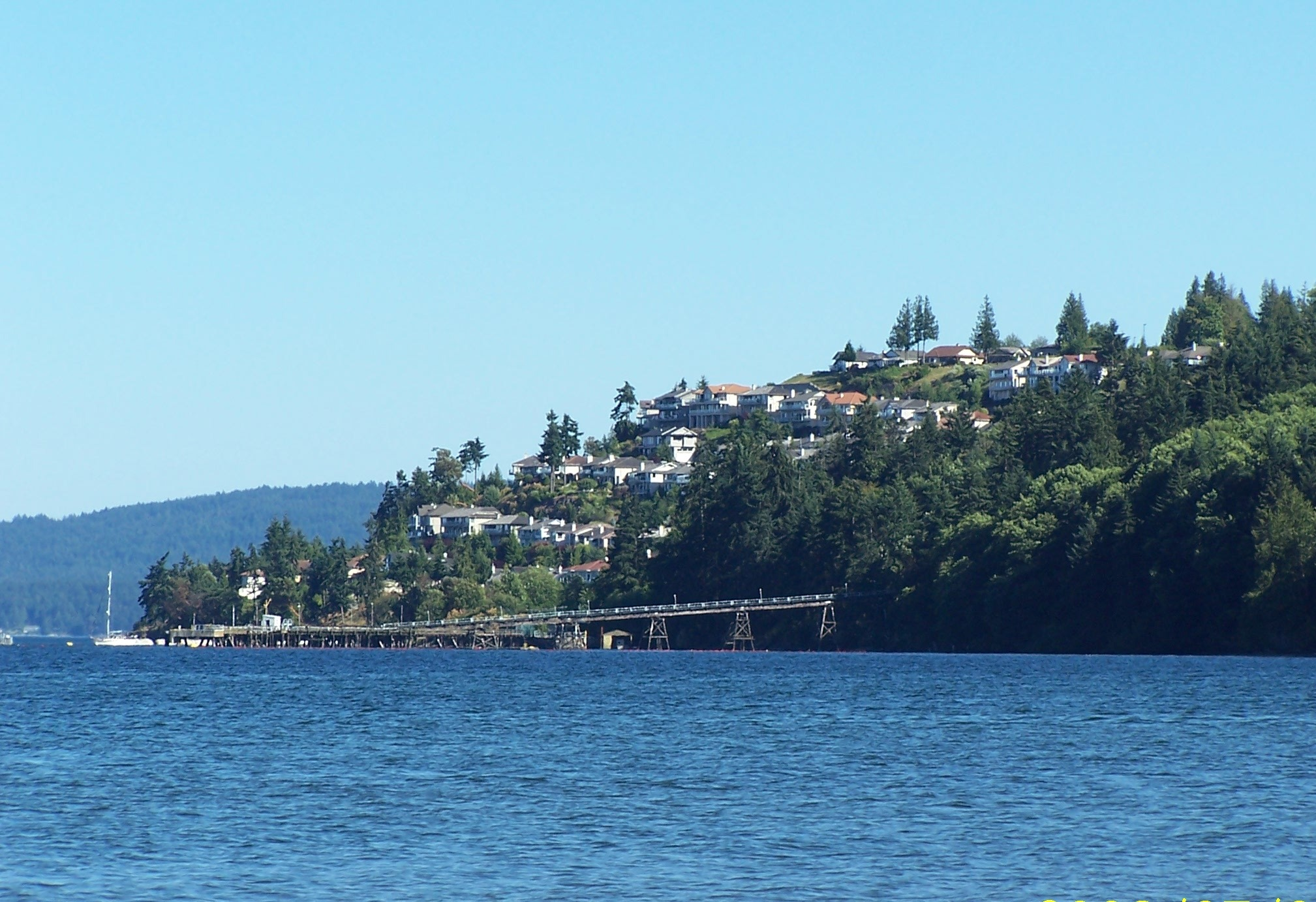
- View of Arbutus Ridge from Cherry Point Beach Park
- Motto: "Canada's Most Livable and Vibrant Adult Community"
- Location of Arbutus Ridge in British Columbia
- Coordinates: 48°41′35″N 123°32′24″W
- Country: Canada
- Province: British Columbia
- Regional District: Cowichan Valley
- Incorporated: 1987

Government
  - Governing body: Arbutus Ridge Strata Corporation Council
  - MP (Cowichan-Malahat-Langford): Jeff Kibble
  - MLA (Juan de Fuca-Malahat): Mike Hicks

Area
  - Total: 0.60 km^{2} (0.23 sq mi)
- Elevation: 100 m (330 ft)

Population (2021)
  - Total: 1,085
- Time zone: UTC−07:00 (PT)
- Postal code span: V8H 0K8
- Area codes: 250 and 778
- Highways: British Columbia Highway 1 ie Trans-Canada Highway
- Waterways: Strait of Georgia
- Website: Arbutus Ridge Seaside Community for Active Adults

Arbutus Ridge Seaside Community for Active Adults is an age-qualified, gated community located on the southeastern coast of Vancouver Island in the Cobble Hill Electoral Area of British Columbia's Cowichan Valley Regional District. "Arbutus Ridge was the first comprehensive retirement community built in Canada and it subsequently became the template and proving ground for what has become recognized as an accepted and commonplace age-specific form of housing." Even though the community was incorporated in 1987, it was not until 2018 that the Province of British Columbia approved the adoption of the name "Arbutus Ridge" as the official name for the community.

== Location ==
The community is constructed on a 60-hectare (150-acre) site on a ridge, rising 100 m (328 ft)+ above sea level, overlooking Satellite Channel of the Strait of Georgia in the Salish Sea. The bordering seawater is part of Parks Canada's proposed Southern Strait of Georgia National Marine Conservation Area announced in 2011 to ensure ecological sustainability of the marine environment.

The community is 50 km (31 miles) north of Victoria and 70 km (43 miles) south of Nanaimo. A BC Forests Ministry scientific brochure compares the climate in this area to other locations in Canada: "This small corner of the province enjoys perhaps the finest climate in Canada. Sheltered by the rain shadow of the Vancouver Island and Olympic Mountains, and warmed by the air from the Pacific, the area basks in a Mediterranean-like environment of warm, sunny summers and mild wet winters. Unlike more exposed coastal areas, this zone experiences long, dry summers, a major factor in its ecology.". Month-by-month historical averages are reported in the "Climate" section below.

== Scope ==
The Real Estate Foundation of British Columbia had been examining the development of retirement communities over two decades and in 2009 they commissioned a survey of patterns and trends to better prepare municipal governments for integration with such communities. Their survey of coastal retirement communities in the province categorized Arbutus Ridge as a "master planned lifestyle gated community". Their report compared relevant attributes of Arbutus Ridge and eight more established retirement communities on Vancouver Island.

In a June 2000 article on Arbutus Ridge, the Victoria Times-Colonist reported: "Twelve years after the project's inception, a new generation is buying into the landscape of Vancouver Island's only gated adult community." "By the time the last phase is complete, there will be 646 homes creating a community of about 1,200 people." "The strata bylaws state that only two people can live in a home and one partner in a couple must be over 50 years old." In 2023 the BC Government, in an effort to make housing more accessible for households with children, banned Strata Corporations from imposing minimum age requirements. In order to preserve the culture of their community, the residents of Arbutus Ridge subsequently passed a resolution to amend a Bylaw thereby increasing the minimum age requirement for Arbutus Ridge from 50 to 55 (for one partner in a couple). This is permissible under provincial legislation.

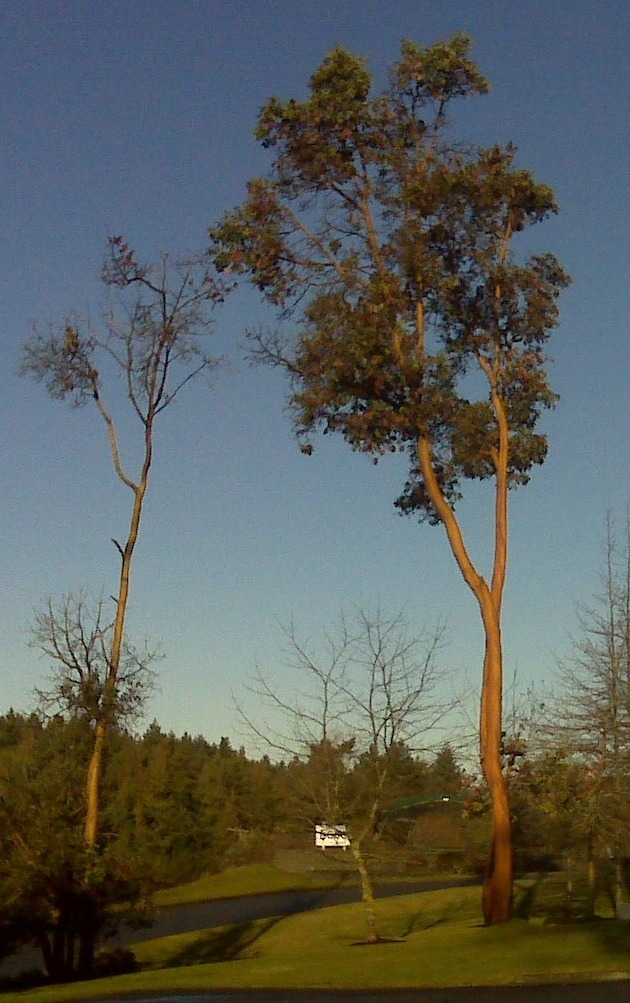
Arbutus tree, the Community Namesake

"Both demands and house sizes have increased since the development was first created in 1988. The first houses built in the community were 1,000-1,400 square foot (93–130 m^{2}), one-level designs that were either semi-detached patio homes or ranchers without basements. By 1992, the developer was following the lead of major US retirement builders...a second level with a walk-out basement and sizes ranging 1,800 to 2,100 square feet (170–200 m^{2}). In the final phase, 80% of the homes were 2,400-2,800 square feet (220–260 m^{2})."

"For common property and services, residents contribute...a fee...monthly to the strata corporation to manage everything from road maintenance and sewage treatment to garbage collection and security." In spite of the proximity of the golf course, "...Arbutus Ridge is not a one-dimensional community."

Statistics Canada's 2021 Census classified Arbutus Ridge as "a designated unincorporated place in the Cowichan Valley" and reported a population of 1085. The reported age range distribution of the population was: 50 and under, 1%; 51–70, 34%; 71–80, 41% and over 80, 24%.

As previously reported by the BC Real Estate Foundation survey, the community comprises "646 individual residential units" and includes "lifestyle amenities golf, health, business centre, with an activity coordinator". The residential neighbourhoods intertwine with the 18-hole Arbutus Ridge Golf Course. The community is fully developed and the number of houses and the number of residents will not increase significantly in future. Residents voted in June 2009 to ask the Cowichan Valley Regional District to assume operational responsibility for the water, sanitary sewer and drainage systems. In reporting on this transfer from the developer to the municipality after 20 years, the Cowichan Valley Citizen newspaper described Arbutus Ridge as "a large luxury subdivision, almost a village".

== Climate ==
Climate data for Arbutus Ridge
Month	Jan	Feb	Mar	Apr	May	Jun	Jul	Aug	Sep	Oct	Nov	Dec	Year
Record high °C (°F)	15 (59)	19 (66)	21 (70)	26 (79)	34 (93)	36 (97)	38 (100)	38 (100)	35 (95)	28 (82)	19 (66)	17 (63)	38 (100)
Mean daily maximum °C (°F)	6 (43)	8 (46)	11 (52)	14 (57)	17 (63)	20 (68)	23 (73)	24 (75)	20 (68)	15 (59)	9 (48)	6 (43)	14.5 (58.1)
Mean daily minimum °C (°F)	−1 (30)	0 (32)	1 (34)	3 (37)	6 (43)	9 (48)	11 (52)	11 (52)	7 (45)	4 (39)	1 (34)	−1 (30)	4.3 (39.7)
Record low °C (°F)	−21 (−6)	−16 (3)	−12 (10)	−4 (25)	−2 (28)	2 (36)	3 (37)	2 (36)	−3 (27)	−7 (19)	−17 (1)	−22 (−8)	−22 (−8)
Average precipitation mm (inches)	145 (5.7)	130 (5.1)	102 (4.0)	54 (2.1)	44 (1.7)	37 (1.5)	20 (0.8)	25 (1.0)	47 (1.9)	80 (3.1)	169 (6.7)	185 (7.3)	1,038 (40.9)
Average rainfall mm (inches)	130 (5.1)	122 (4.8)	100 (3.9)	54 (2.1)	44 (1.7)	37 (1.5)	20 (0.8)	25 (1.0)	47 (1.9)	80 (3.1)	164 (6.5)	171 (6.7)	994 (39.1)
Average snowfall cm (inches)	16 (6.3)	8 (3.1)	2 (0.8)	0 (0)	0 (0)	0 (0)	0 (0)	0 (0)	0 (0)	0 (0)	5 (2.0)	14 (5.5)	45 (18)
Source: Environment Canada

== History and evolution of the community ==
=== CRC Canadian Retirement Corporation and Burrard International Holdings Inc. ===
In 1983 James Patrick, the founder of Arbutus Ridge, started researching the need for retirement communities in Canada, considering the pattern established in the US Sun Belt with particular reference to the Sun City retirement community in Arizona. CRC Canadian Retirement Corporation ("CRC") was incorporated under the provincial Business Corporations Act on March 25, 1986, to design and build the community of Arbutus Ridge. Cowichan Valley Regional District issued the Development Permit on April 9, 1987. The CRC development team consisted of Jim Patrick President, Len Reith Vice President and Sales Manager, Bill LeClair Vice President of Finance and Derek Squirell, Vice President Land Development and Golf Course construction. The CRC team was supported primarily by Aplin and Martin Consultants and Davidson Yuen Architects.

Arbutus Ridge was incorporated as a bare-land strata, defined in detail in Strata Plan 1601, under what was then called the Condominium Act, (now the Strata Property Act). Registration of the Plan was completed at the BC Land Title Office in Victoria on November 13, 1987. The "bare land strata" term means that ownership of the land is divided among property owners but each individual house is individually owned and central service buildings are collectively owned. Tidman Construction Ltd. built all the central buildings and houses. Originally, a nine-hole golf course was included: holes 12–16, 2 and 9–11, identified by current number but listed in original sequence of play.

In a framed certificate still on display in the Activity Centre, the developer acknowledged the "pioneers", naming the first 60 property owners as of May 14, 1988. 113 more lots were opened in 1988 and another 119 lots in 1989. In 1989, with the community about half constructed, the project won the Urban Development Institute Pacific Region's "Award of Excellence" for having "achieved the highest standard of excellence and…demonstrated innovations in design, community consultation and customer satisfaction.".

To continue to advance with the second half of the development, an initial public offering of the "Arbutus Ridge Development Limited Partnership" was made on September 1, 1989. The original IPO prospectus from RBC Dominion Securities Inc. provided background information on the community: financing detail, demographics and appraisal on the basis of amenities, security and relative value of investment.

The second half of the development was launched in 1990–92 with 49, 94 and 31 lots opened respectively in those three years, as the residential section advanced to the south down the steeper slopes and west across Ratcliffe Road. This permitted construction of the last nine holes, 1, 3–8, 17 and 18 of the golf course and new clubhouse facility and the covered tennis courts. During the wind-down of the construction of the second half of development, CRC brought in Burrard International Holdings Inc. as a 50% equity partner.

The final 174 lots were opened in six more phases between 1993 and 2010.

=== Strata Plan 1601 and the self-management era ===
Self-management of the community began in 1988 with the formation of a transitional Advisory Council, which held its last meeting November 30, 1988, setting the stage for the next phase of governance. Owners, at an Annual General Meeting on January 18, 1989, elected a Strata Council that held its first meeting on January 25. Now that Arbutus Ridge is completely developed, CRC Developments Ltd. no longer has any involvement in the community.

A 7-member volunteer Strata Council, elected annually at the community's AGM, is responsible for the control, management and administration of the common property, common facilities and the assets of the Strata Corporation as outlined in Part 4 of the Strata Property Act: "Strata Corporation Governance". The Strata Corporation administers the functioning of the community through a number of Strata Committees: Personnel, Communications, Finance, Civil Works, Community Planning, Grounds, Buildings & Facilities, Security and Promotions, each reporting through an elected Councilor.

The Strata Council represents the owners internally, and in all matters regulated by the Act. Administration is carried out in accordance with the Act, and governed by the corporation's registered bylaws and rules. Strata Corporation staff is responsible for the overall operation and fiscal management. Occasionally, outside strata management companies are engaged to help with some of the administrative and operational duties.

Additionally, the Arbutus Ridge Ratepayers Association (ARRA) was incorporated on July 19, 1990, under the BC Society Act to represent homeowners in external matters such as health, transportation, public utilities, community growth and development, environmental protection and social amenities, all of which fall outside the scope of the Strata Property Act.

Arbutus Ridge Emergency Preparedness, the community's volunteer organization integrates its efforts with those of the municipal CVRD Public Safety Department.

On a monthly basis, the community publishes its own newsletter, "Ridge Talk", which is circulated free to all residents. In this newsletter readers will find a calendar of upcoming events, articles on newsworthy topics and a variety of contributions from residents.

The Arbutus Ridge website, www.arbutusridge.ca provides a broad array of current information. The public portion is of broader interest and is open to anyone going to this URL. The resident's website contains further information of specific interest to residents and is accessible only by using an Administration-issued username and password.
