= Maranatha Village =

Coordinates: 27.5168°N 81.4226°W

- is a conservative Baptist Christian retirement community It is headquartered in Sebring, FL
- Interactive map of Maranatha Village
- Country: United States
- State: Florida
- County: Highlands County, Florida

Government
  - Type: Conservative Baptist Christian retirement community
  - manager: Gary Little
- Elevation: 98 ft (30 m)
- Time zone: Eastern EST
- ZIP code: 33870-6817
- Area code: 863

Maranatha Village is a Baptist retirement community located just north of Sebring, Florida. It is on the south side of Arbuckle Creek Road. Maranatha Village is affiliated with the General Association of Regular Baptist Churches.

== Residential facilities ==
Maranatha Village has existed since at least 1973. Although the number of residents varies, it can accommodate approximately 500 people. The usual number of residents is probably about 350. The Village contains a variety of places for people to stay. These include:

- 139 duplex apartments, all on the ground level.
- A 100-lot mobile home park. Mobile-home residents own their homes and lease the sites from Maranatha Village.
- A guest house with six rooms that have kitchenettes. These are available to persons wanting to have a short visit.
- 20 recreational-vehicle spaces with hookups, also for persons desiring short visits to the Village.
- Maranatha Manor, a licensed assisted living facility. Maranatha Manor has space for 20 clients. It had opened as Sunshine Lodge and was closed. It was reopened as Maranatha Manor in 2000 or 2001.

== Other amenities ==
Maranatha Baptist Church, located at 35 Maranatha Boulevard, is regarded as a central part of the Village. The church was organized in 1976. It provides regular church services and is the site of various Bible conferences and concerts. Daily devotions are conducted every morning at the church. The church helped found two area Baptist churches and in 2000 voted to reopen Sunshine Lodge, which was renamed Maranatha Manor.

Hamman Hall is the Village's fellowship hall. Various community activities, such as dinners and film presentations, take place there. Hamman Hall also has a library.

Maranatha Village has three ponds. The largest one is on the property's northeast corner. It is roughly in the shape of a backward "7." It has a fountain in its northwest corner. Roads and duplexes border its south and west sides. It has a 4.9-acre (20,000 m^{2}) surface area. As an unnamed lake is defined as at least a 5-acre (20,000 m^{2}) surface area, this body is just too small to be considered a lake. A second pond is roughly in the center of the Village. It is basically rectangular. A sidewalk borders this pond's east and north sides. The pond has a 1.2-acre (4,900 m^{2}) surface area. The third and smallest pond is 600 feet (180 m) to the second pond's northwest. It is square and has a 0.7-acre (2,800 m^{2}) surface area.
