= Age-restricted community =

Community with age restrictions

An age-restricted community is a residential community, often gated, that legally discriminates on the basis of age to limit residency to a majority fraction of older individuals—typically 80% over a set age. The minimum age is frequently set at 55 years old, but it can vary.

These communities are set up to accommodate older individuals who would like to live in an area without the problems of having children around. In most cases a younger spouse or significant other is permitted to live in the community as long as one member meets the minimum age requirement.

Age-qualified communities, also known as 55+ communities, active adult communities, lifestyle communities, or retirement communities, are often planned communities that offer homes and community features that are attractive to 55+ adults. These might include a clubhouse or lifestyle center with a good many activities, sometimes with indoor and outdoor swimming pools, exercise facilities, craft rooms, demonstration kitchens, and decks and patios for gathering.

== Canada ==
A noteworthy Canadian example, Arbutus Ridge Seaside Community for Active Adults in the Cowichan Valley on Vancouver Island, was the first comprehensive retirement community built in Canada. It is a private community that subsequently became the template and proving ground for what has become accepted and commonplace. In 2015, that template was expanded in line with the growing desire for spiritually focused retirement living as Global Kingdom Ministries unveiled Trinity Ravine Towers in Toronto, one of the country's first Christian community living condominium complexes.

== United States ==
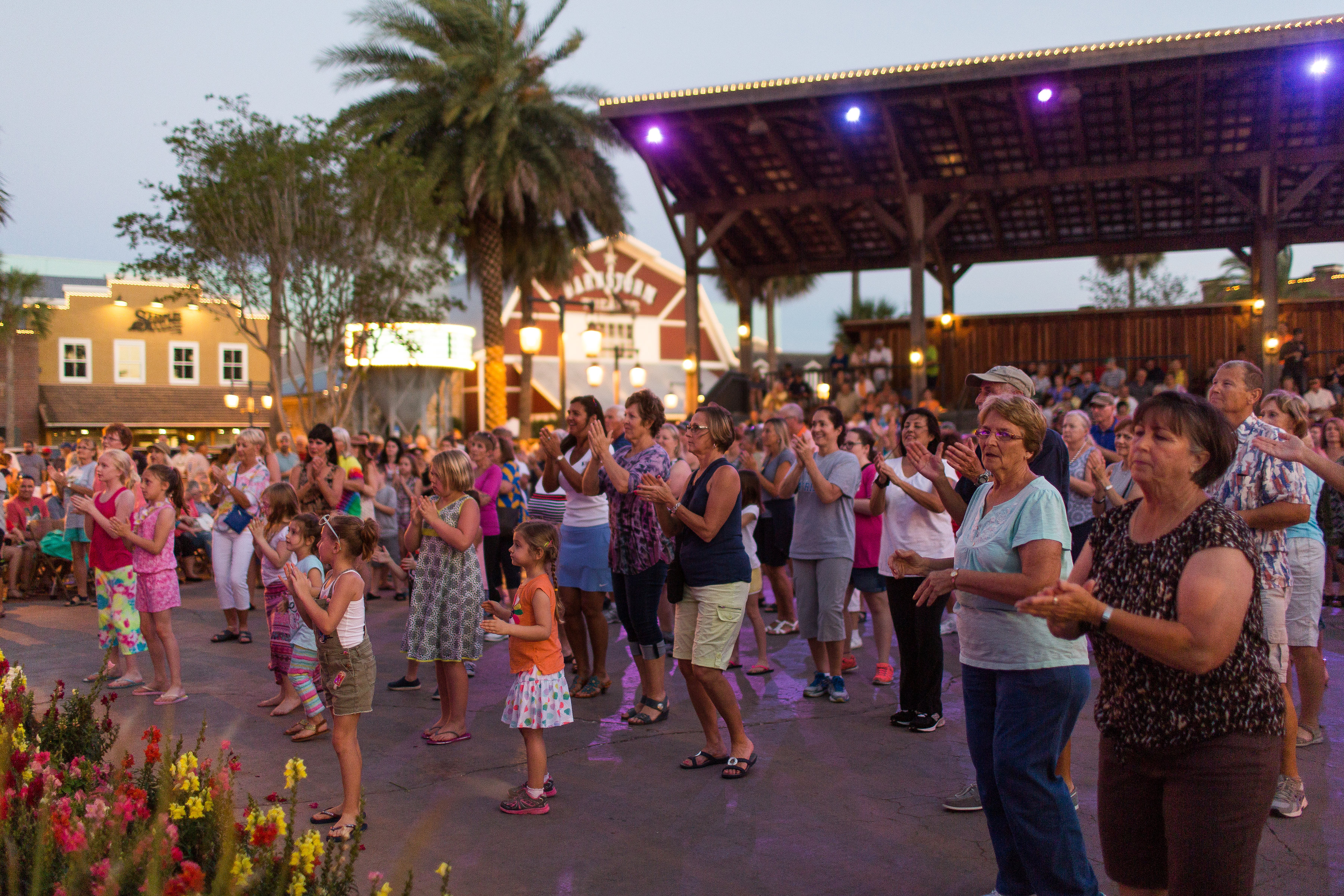
An entertainment venue at The Villages, Florida.

According to 55places.com, Florida has the most age-restricted communities with more than 375 communities, with New Jersey coming in second with more than 230 age-restricted communities. Other popular states for age-restricted communities include Oregon, North Carolina, South Carolina, Pennsylvania, Texas and Utah.

While in the United States discrimination in housing is generally prohibited, the Fair Housing Act of 1968 and the Housing for Older Persons Act of 1995 (109 STAT. 787) allow communities to restrict residency to older individuals. Individuals may buy into these properties regardless of age; however, the owner may be prohibited from occupying the property according to the association declarations and bylaws.

According to research compiled by TRI Pointe Homes, of the 75 million people who comprise the boomer generation, over 32 million of these who are over the age of 55 would consider living in an age-restricted community.

=== Costs ===
With most age restricted communities, there are homeowner association (HOA) fees that cover services and amenities to resident such as golf courses, game nights, clubhouses, pools, television service, Internet connectivity, and landscaping. In the United States, these fees can range from $100 — $500 a month.

== Communities ==
- Arbutus Ridge Retirement Community
- Garden Spot Village
- Laguna Woods Village
- Laguna Woods, California
- Leisure World, Arizona
- Leisure World, Maryland
- Leisure World, Seal Beach, California
- Maranatha Village
- Saddlebrooke, Arizona
- Scarlet Oaks
- Smithville, Atlantic County, New Jersey
- Sun City Center, Florida
- Sun City Festival
- Sun City Palm Desert, California
- Sun City Texas
- Sun City West, Arizona
- Sun City, Arizona
- Sun City, Menifee, California
- Sun Lakes, Arizona
- The Villages, Florida
- Chambers Creek, Texas

== Criticism ==
A common problem occurs when the homeowner dies; if the surviving resident does not meet the requirements for ownership, then he or she is forced to sell the home. This can happen even if the survivor is the spouse of the deceased. However, many age-restricted communities have circumvented this issue by allowing the survivor to maintain residency as noted in the deed restrictions.

Another common problem arises when a change in the family situation renders a grandparent responsible for a grandchild. Often grandchildren are prohibited from living more than a short time (often 90 days) in a community.

Less obvious, but self evident, is that a collection of older individuals lends itself to being a target of elder abuse (fraud or deceptive acts). Arguably, even developers of aged-restricted communities may incorporate such abuse into their business models, e.g., home warranty and defective building claims are successfully overcome merely by delaying long enough (through promised but undelivered remedies, slow customer service departments, and litigation) to outlive elderly claimants, even those with heirs who may simply wish to settle probate and move on with their own lives. Furthermore, age-restricted communities are often established as deed-restricted communities with Covenants, Conditions, and Restrictions (CC&Rs, which see) or a home owners' association (HOA, which also see), under the developer's control until turned over to the Lot Owners to elect their own HOA board and administer the CC&Rs that govern the HOA; and although these arrangements are prescribed, they usually require assistance of a professional management company and likely the one originally selected by the developer with years of records while the retirement village was being built-out; but professional management companies are for-profit enterprises, unlike most HOAs that are incorporated as non-profit entities. Therefore volunteer board members (elected from and by the other Lot Owners after the developer leaves, and themselves elderly), may not be up to the task of overseeing developments with hundreds of homes, equal in size to a village or even small town, much more to mete out justice in the form of fines (that may lead to foreclosure of offending properties) after sanctioning CC&R violators and sometimes hearing their appeals. Reliance on a property management company may also expose elderly residents to less vigilance or careful treatment for their safety and thrift in contracting for maintenance, repairs, and other expenses. Despite the popularity of age restricted HOAs, residents thereof may face certain drawbacks as described above, which local authorities may not be eager to address given the revenue streams related to residential construction and increased population. Some critiques of how HOAs operate exist and offer greater scrutiny along the lines of this particular criticism (and many persuasive arguments for readers' consideration, i.e., such as the following citation focusing on the problem of volunteer board members ruling on upholding fines assessed by a for profit management company against other Lot Owners.).
